= Idol (franchise) =

Reality television music competition format

Idols
- Created by: Simon Fuller
- Original work: Pop Idol
- Owners: Fremantle; 19 Entertainment (Sony Pictures)
- Years: 2001–present

Films and television
- Television series: Idols (independent international versions, see below)

Audio
- Original music: Scores composed by Julian Gingell, Barry Stone (Jules and Stone) and Cathy Dennis

Miscellaneous
- Genre: Reality; Singing competition
- First aired: 6 October 2001; 25 years ago
- Related shows: Popstars; Star Academy; The X Factor; Got Talent; The Voice; The Sing-Off; Rising Star; Nashville Star

Idol (also known as SuperStar in some countries), commonly known as Idols, is a reality television singing competition format created by British television producer Simon Fuller and developed by Fremantle. The format began in 2001 with the British television series Pop Idol; its first adaptation was the South African series Idols in 2002. It has since become the world's most widely watched television franchise, as well as one of the most successful entertainment formats, adapted in over 56 regions around the world, with its various versions broadcast to 150 countries with a worldwide audience of roughly 3.2 billion people. The franchise has generated more than $2.5 billion in revenue.

Each season, the series aims to find the most outstanding unsigned solo recording artist (or "idol") in a region. Originally aimed for pop singers, the series has since evolved to accept singers from different genres of music, such as rock, R&B, and country. Through a series of mass auditions, a group of finalists are selected by a panel of judges (which usually consists of artists and record producers) who offer critiques on their performances. The finalists then advance to the weekly live shows. On each live show, the contestants all sing, the television audience votes (by telephone, SMS Internet, and via apps), and then the contestant who receives the fewest votes gets eliminated. The final episode is the grand finale episode, when usually two, but sometimes three or four, finalists are left, and the contestant who gets the largest number of votes is declared the winner. The winner receives a recording contract, monetary prizes, and a title as their nation's "Idol", "SuperStar" or "Star". Sometimes one or more of the runners-up get recording contracts as well.

The various series have launched the careers of a number of highly successful recording artists around the world, including Idol winners Will Young of the United Kingdom, Kelly Clarkson, Carrie Underwood, Scotty McCreery, Fantasia, Ruben Studdard, David Cook, and Phillip Phillips of the United States, Kurt Nilsen of Norway, Ryan Malcolm and Kalan Porter of Canada, Guy Sebastian of Australia, and Elvis Blue of South Africa. Contestants who did not win but have still gone on to prominence include Anthony Callea, Ricki-Lee Coulter and Jessica Mauboy of Australia, Loreen and Måns Zelmerlöw of Sweden, Jacob Hoggard and Carly Rae Jepsen of Canada, and Clay Aiken, Chris Daughtry, Gabby Barrett, Lauren Alaina, and Adam Lambert of the United States, among many others. Some Idol contestants have also achieved success in acting and musical theater such as Melissa O'Neil of Canada, and most notably EGOT winner Jennifer Hudson of American Idol.

== Origin and background ==
In 2001, British talent manager and television producer Simon Fuller created the British television series Pop Idol. The series was developed by production company Fremantle and was broadcast on ITV on 6 October 2001. Fuller, along with television producer Nigel Lythgoe, was inspired to create the series by the New Zealand television series Popstars, which was adopted in the United Kingdom as Popstars in January 2001. The first series of Pop Idol proved to be more popular than Popstars, in part due to the chemistry of the judges and the success of its first winner Will Young.

Pop Idol's success led to an interest for adaptations in other countries. Before selling the format, Fuller reached out for an out-of-court settlement with Popstars creator Jonathan Dowling, in which international versions of Idols will be prohibited to use the prefix Pop in their local titles. As such, South Africa was the first international adaptation under the official franchise name - Idols. Idols was first televised on 10 March 2002, one month after the first series of Pop Idol ended.

Fuller, Lythgoe, and Pop Idol judge Simon Cowell attempted to sell the format in the United States in 2001, but the idea was met with poor response from major networks. Elisabeth Murdoch, daughter of News Corporation chairman Rupert Murdoch, persuaded her father to buy the rights for an American adaptation. The series, American Idol: The Search for a Superstar, debuted on the Fox network on 11 June 2002. American Idol went on to become the all-time most dominant show in the U.S. TV ratings, due to the popularity of the judges (particularly Simon Cowell) and its contestants, which were led by its first winner, Kelly Clarkson.

The success brought by American Idol led to even more adaptations in other countries, where the Dutch Idols became the top television series in the Netherlands during its airing.

There has been a global version of the franchise, called World Idol. The show was a television special, where winners of national Idol shows will compete against each other. The special was won by Kurt Nilsen, a singer from Norway. A current World version of Idol acts as a YouTube channel, called Idols Global. The channel uploads clips of Idol shows from around the world. The channel currently has over 1 million subscribers. There are many more channels like this. Additionally, many individual Idol shows have their own YouTube channels.

== Concept ==
The show is a reality television singing competition where the winner is selected by the audience voting. The show combines a number of elements previously used by other shows such as Popstars – mass auditioning, the search of a new star, and the use of a judging panel that critiques the auditioners' performance and selects the contestants. An important element is audience participation, where the audience may vote by telephone or text to decide which contestant can proceed further each week and ultimately win. According to the show creator, Simon Fuller, "the interactivity was important because this would allow the audience to tell me who they liked best and this, in turn, would indicate to me who would have the most fans and eventually sell the most music and become the biggest stars." To this is added "the drama of backstories and the real-life soap opera of the unfolding real-time events" as the show is presented as a live competition event which drew "more from a sporting concept of true competition".

== Format ==
=== Hosts ===
Each show has at least one host that directs the show, introduces the singers and delivers the results of each episode including the finale. While some countries have one host (Ryan Seacrest in American Idol, Robby Purba and Enzy Storia in Indonesian Idol (replacing Daniel Mananta and Boy William in season 3–10 and in season 11-13), Dominic Bowden in New Zealand Idol, ProVerb in Idols SA, IK Osakioduwa in Nigerian Idol and Phan Anh, Huy Khánh, Duy Hải and Đức Bảo in Vietnam Idol since the third season), most shows have two co-hosts. As well as judges, some countries have adopted new members to the hosting/jury party.

=== Judges/jury ===
A preselected panel of music industry representatives tour some, if not all audition cities (depending on which show) to observe and advance those auditioning throughout the show up to and including the Grand Finale. The judges offer critiques and/or advice after each contestant performance, which can be positive or negative; Nouvelle Star 4 for the first time in any country introduced a red and blue "score card" type system where the jury award a blue "positive" or red "negative" rating and in Nouvelle Star 14, they introduced a scoring system where the jury give a point from a range of 1 to 10 after every mottoshow performance.

As many as five stable jury members have appeared in any one Idol season (Idol Poland 3, Indonesian Idol 9), though some versions offer "guest judges" or special musical guests on the program to also offer advice.

The judges of some shows gain a lot of popularity outside of the show as well as the contestants, due to their being collectively known to have a "caustic" or raw & blunt attitude towards contestants' performances, notably Simon Cowell from American Idol and Pop Idol, Rossa, Judika, Bunga Citra Lestari, Ari Lasso, Anang Hermansyah, Agnez Mo, Ahmad Dhani, Titi DJ, Soleh Solihun, and Indra Lesmana from Indonesian Idol, Amy Shark, Ian "Dicko" Dickson, and Kyle Sandilands from Australian Idol , Neha Kakkar, and Sonu Nigam, also Anu Malik from Indian Idol, Mỹ Tâm and Maia Estianty in Vietnam Idol and Indonesian Idol amongst others.

=== Performance stages ===
Auditions are held in numerous places in any particular region or country that give most people (audition entry is bound by certain legal requirements such as age and citizenship for example) the chance to sing in front of musical/television producers and if successful, they advance to a recorded televised audition where the show "judges" advance up to 300 people in some countries to the next round.

The Theatre round is where a specially selected group of auditioners from all regional auditions converge (always in the host city) to perform in three sub stages: a chorus line in groups of 10 where free song choices are allowed, a trio (or less commonly a duo or quartet) where contestants must memorize a preselected song to perform and choreograph together, and finally a solo a cappella round where contestants sing a song of their own choice without musical backing in front of friends, family, judges & fellow contestants.

Each stage of the theatre round, a number of contestants are eliminated and sent home by the judges, though in some countries there have been very few contestants brought back during the Wildcards show or by the disqualification or resignation of another contestant.

In American Idol, this stage was expanded to five stages (three in Hollywood, two in Las Vegas) from seasons 10 to 12.

The semi-finals occurs usually live or pre-recorded (in some countries) where contestants sing in a television studio fully televised; again judges give critiques but beginning at this stage, home viewers vote via telephone and SMS (and in some countries other voting mechanisms including via Internet or via Red Button) who they want to stay in the competition. During the "semi-final" weeks, contestants receive a workshop tuition with a vocal coach to prepare their song of choice. The format started out with contestants only singing along to a piano, though other instruments & even a live band have been introduced to some versions.

An average semi-final usually consists of 18 to 50 contestants where they either perform in an even group of contestants (three groups of ten for example) or in a "heat" type semi-final where the contestants sing every week until all finalists have been chosen. During the format, a Wildcards feature was introduced which re-introduced past semi-finalists to receive a second chance to become a finalist, in some shows – the judges sometimes pick one or more contestants to advance as well as the viewers' vote. As of late, live audiences have been incorporated into the semi-final round.

A results show of the semi-finals usually airs either a few hours after the performance show or the night after where the results are given. Three or four contestants are told that they may have received highest votes, though only a selected two or three are put through to the finals.

The Live shows (a.k.a. Mottoshows, Spectacular shows or theme shows) are an elaborate and spectacular version of the semi-final. There is a weekly theme on which contestants must base their song choices, such as "80s Hits" or "Hits of Elton John" for example. In a bid to counter sagging ratings, contestants on Australian Idol were allowed to bring instruments on stage with them and had the opportunity to sing original material from the 2006 season, a world first. Since then America and Canada have followed Australia's lead. Again a results show follows the show; this time it may include group performances, musical guests or extra footage of the contestants' time on the show. The contestant(s) with the lowest polled votes leaves the competition. The live shows continue until there are only two contestants left in the competition or three contestants in some cases.

The Grand Finale occurs when there are two (or, rarely, three and only once so far four) contestants left in the competition. This is the pinnacle of the entire series and often highest rated show; also for some countries, it is venued in a prestigious location (American Idol: Dolby Theatre/Nokia Theatre, Canadian Idol: John Bassett Theatre, Australian Idol: Sydney Opera House, Philippine Idol: Araneta Coliseum, Indonesian Idol: Ecovention Ocean Ecopark/Hall D2 JIExpo/RCTI+ Studios, Idol Sweden: Ericsson Globe, Singapore Idol: Singapore Indoor Stadium). In this final stage a specially awarded song is sung by both remaining contestants which is ultimately slated to be released as the winner's debut single though recently in some countries this has been phased out.

During the extended results show, there are usually group performances and/or special musical guests. Also, it has the best moments of the series which leads up to the announcement of the winner, which is determined by the highest number of votes. When that happens, he or she will perform an encore of the coronation single which sometimes includes pyrotechnics/fireworks.

While the show's premise is to find one winner with promises of a recording deal and other frugal benefits, the Idol series often has several contestants who go onto the same route of fame, whether they be finalists, semi-finalists, or even auditioners. Key examples of this from American Idol include Clay Aiken (second place, season 2) and Chris Daughtry (fourth place, season 5, through his band Daughtry), who have each outsold all American Idol winners except Kelly Clarkson and Carrie Underwood; Jennifer Hudson (seventh place, season 3), who would later win the Academy Award for Best Supporting Actress; and William Hung, who turned his off-key season 3 audition into a recording career and has outsold some finalists.

=== Releases ===
Often, a studio compilation album and/or a CD single is made to promote the show. In some cases, DVDs of highlights of the show will be released. While these releases have sold well in countries including the United States and Australia, many countries did not release CDs after the first series.

Since season 6, American Idol has sold only promotional downloads instead of CDs. For season 6, it sold studio-recorded MP3 and performance video downloads of the finalists on its website; no CDs were sold prior to the post-Idol releases of winner Jordin Sparks and runner-up Blake Lewis. For season 7, audio and video downloads are sold exclusively through the iTunes Store, which became a sponsor in that season; the iTunes downloads have included audio of all semi-finalist performances, studio recordings and performance videos for all finalists, videos of finalist group performances, and audio and video performances from the Idol Gives Back episode.

=== Media/sponsorship ===
Sony Music is the general record company associated and affiliated with the Idols format in most countries, though countries like Iceland, Vietnam and Kazakhstan have affiliate labels as they do not have a local Sony Music subsidiary. FremantleMedia and Sony Music were related through common parent Bertelsmann, which owns 90.4% of FremantleMedia's immediate parent RTL Group and previously owned 50% of joint venture Sony BMG from 2004 to 2008. Since 2011, Universal Music Group replaced Sony Music Entertainment as the general record company associated and affiliated with the Idols format in most countries.

== Idols around the world ==
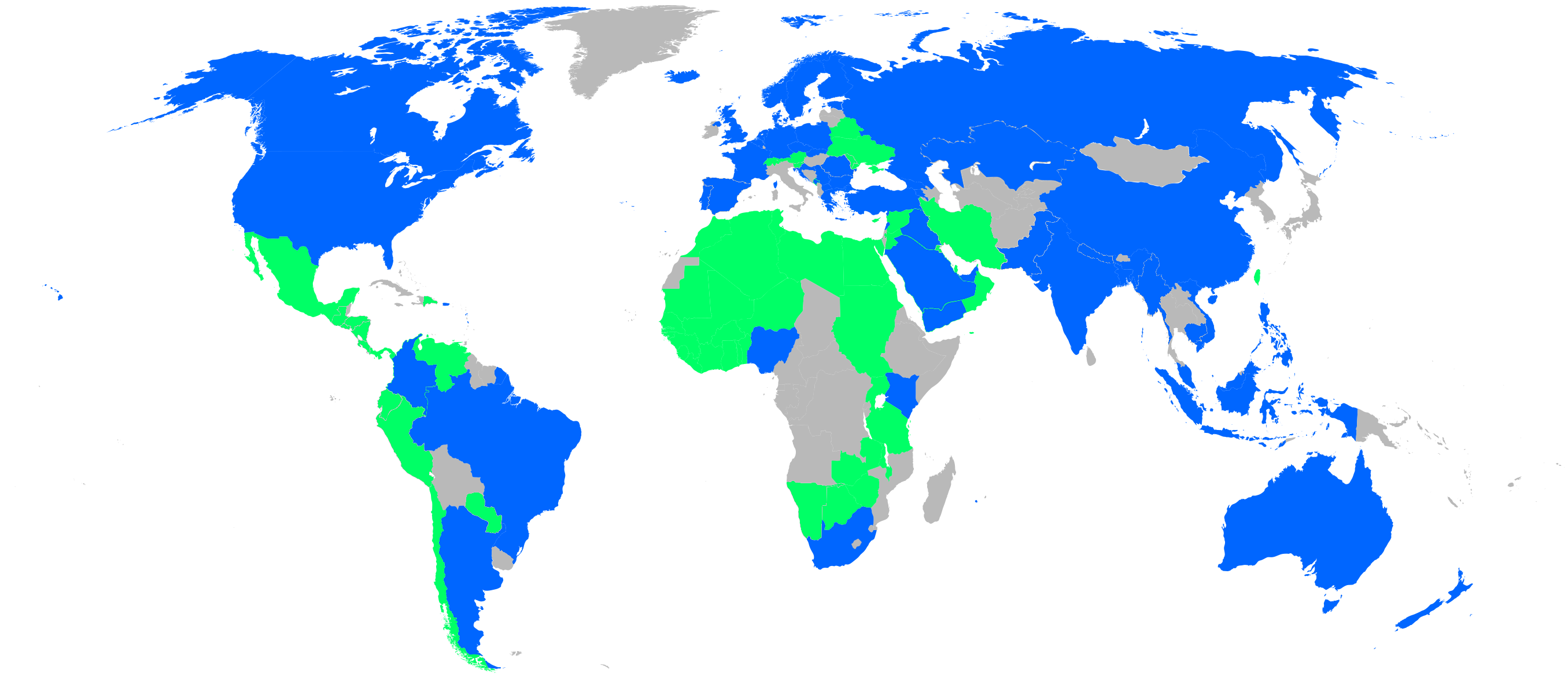
Countries that have their own versions of Idols. Countries that film their own versions are in blue, while those that take part in a series with other countries are in green

=== International versions ===
Franchise that is currently airing
Franchise with an upcoming season
Franchise that is not currently airing

Country/Region	Local title(s)	Network	Winners	Judges
Arab League^{8}	سوبر ستار (Super Star)	Future TV	Season 1 (2003): Diana Karazon; Season 2 (2004): Ayman Alatar; Season 3 (2005–06): Ibrahim El Hakami; Season 4 (2007): Marwan Ali; Season 5 (2008): Elie Bitar	Elias Rahbani (1–5); Abdullah Al Qaoud (1–5); Tonia Moreeb (1); Fadia Tenb Al Hadj (2–4); Ziad Botrous (3–5); Gihan El-Naser (5)
Arab League^{8}	Arab Idol	MBC 1	Season 1 (2011–12): Carmen Suleiman; Season 2 (2013): Mohammed Assaf; Season 3 (2014): Hazem Sharif; Season 4 (2016–17): Yacoub Shaheen	Ragheb Alama (1–2); Ahlam (1–4); Hassan El Shafei (1–4); Nancy Ajram (2–4); Wael Kfoury (3–4)
Armenia	Հայ Սուպերսթար (Hay Superstar)	Shant TV	Season 1 (2006): Susanna Petrosyan; Season 2 (2006–07): Lusine Aghabekyan; Season 3 (2007–08): Lusi Harutyunyan; Season 4 (2009–10): Raffi Ohanian; Season 5 (2011–12): Sona Rubenyan; Season 6 (2025): Areg Galstyan	Egor Glumov (1–4, 6); Michael Poghosyan (1–4); Naira Gurjianyan (1–4); Leila Saribekyan (5); Avet Barseghyan (5); Garik Papoyan (5); André (5–6); Syuzanna Melqonyan (6); Sona Sarkisyan (6)
Australia	Australian Idol	Current; Seven Network (8–); Former; Network Ten (1–7)	Season 1 (2003): Guy Sebastian; Season 2 (2004): Casey Donovan; Season 3 (2005): Kate DeAraugo; Season 4 (2006): Damien Leith; Season 5 (2007): Natalie Gauci; Season 6 (2008): Wes Carr; Season 7 (2009): Stan Walker; Season 8 (2023): Royston Sagigi-Baira; Season 9 (2024): Dylan Wright; Season 10 (2025): Marshall Hamburger; Season 11 (2026): Kesha Oayda; Season 12 (2027): Upcoming season	Current; Marcia Hines (1–7, 9–); Amy Shark (8–); Morgan Evans (12–); Former; Mark Holden (1–5); Ian "Dicko" Dickson (1–2, 5–7); Jay Dee Springbett (7 semi-finals onwards); Meghan Trainor (8); Harry Connick Jr (8); Kyle Sandilands (3–6, 7 (auditions), 8–11)
Bangladesh	Bangladeshi Idol	SA TV	Season 1 (2013): Mong Uching Marma	Andrew Kishore; Ayub Bachchu; Ferdausi Rahman; Mehreen Mahmud
Belgium	Idool	VTM	Season 1 (2003): Peter Evrard; Season 2 (2004): Joeri Fransen; Season 3 (2007): Dean Delannoit; Season 4 (2011): Kevin Kayirangwa	Jean Blaute (1–4); Jan Leyers (1–2); Nina De Man (1–2); Bart Brusseleers (1–2); Vera Mann (3); Herman Schueremans (3); Patrick Carbonez (3); Sylvia Van Driessche (4); Wouter Van Belle (4); Koen Buyse (4)
Brazil	Ídolos	SBT (1–2); RecordTV (3–7)	Season 1 (2006): Leandro Lopes; Season 2 (2007): Thaeme Mariôto; Season 3 (2008): Rafael Barreto; Season 4 (2009): Saulo Roston; Season 5 (2010): Israel Lucero; Season 6 (2011): Henrique Lemes; Season 7 (2012): Everton Silva	Arnaldo Saccomani (1–2); Cyz Zamorano (1–2); Thomas Roth (1–2); Carlos Eduardo Miranda (1–2); Luiz Calainho (3–5); Paula Lima (3–5); Marco Camargo (3–7); Luiza Possi (6); Rick Bonadio (6); Fafá de Belém (7); Supla (7)
Brazil	Ídolos Kids	RecordTV	Season 1 (2012): Fernando Franco; Season 2 (2013): Julia Tavares	Afonso Nigro; João Gordo; Kelly Key
Bulgaria^{1}	Music Idol	bTV	Season 1 (2007): Nevena Tsoneva; Season 2 (2008): Toma Zdravkov; Season 3 (2009): Magi Djanavarova	Yordanka Hristova (1); Slavi Trifonov (1); Gloria (1); Doni (1, 3); Vili Kazasyan (2); Dimitar Kovalchev – Funky (2–3); Esil Duran (2); Lucy Diakovska (2); Maria (3)
Cambodia	Cambodian Idol	Hang Meas HDTV	Season 1 (2015): Ny Ratana; Season 2 (2016): Chhin Manich; Season 3 (2017–18): Kry Thaipov; Season 4 (2022): Lim Tichmeng; Season 5 (2024): Ki Savin	Aok Sokunkanha; Nop Bayyareth; Chhorn Sovannareach; Preap Sovath (1–3); Sok Seylalin (4–5)
Cambodia	Cambodian Idol Junior	Hang Meas HDTV	Season 1 (2019): Phoeun Sopheap; Season 2 (2023): Sam Lida	Sok Seylalin (1–2); Preap Sovath (1); Chhorn Sovannareach (1); Sokun Nisa (2); Zono (2)
Canada	Canadian Idol	CTV	Season 1 (2003): Ryan Malcolm; Season 2 (2004): Kalan Porter; Season 3 (2005): Melissa O'Neil; Season 4 (2006): Eva Avila; Season 5 (2007): Brian Melo; Season 6 (2008): Theo Tams	Farley Flex; Jake Gold; Sass Jordan; Zack Werner
China	中国梦之声 Chinese Idol	DragonTV	Season 1 (2013): Li Xiangxiang; Season 2 (2014): Zheng Xingqi	Han Hong (1–2); Huang Xiaoming (1); Coco Lee (1); Wang Wei-chung (1); Vivian Hsu (2); Richie Jen (2); Guo Jingming (2)
Colombia	Idol Colombia	RCN Televisión	Season 1 (2014): Luis Ángel Racini	Peter Manjarres; Rosario; Alejandro Villalobos; Eddy Herrera
Croatia	Hrvatski Idol	Nova TV	Season 1 (2003–04): Žanamari Lalić; Season 2 (2004–05): Patrick Jurdić	Đorđe Novković; Miroslav Škoro; Nikša Bratoš; Goran Karan
Croatia	Hrvatska traži zvijezdu	RTL	Season 1 (2009): Bojan Jambrošić; Season 2 (2010): Kim Verson; Season 3 (2011): Goran Kos	Tony Cetinski; Goran Lisica-Fox; Ivana Mišerić (3); Anđa Marić (2); Jelena Radan (1)
Croatia	Superstar	RTL	Season 1 (2023): Hana Ivković; Season 2 (2024): Karla Miklaužić	Severina; Tonči Huljić; Filip Miletić; Nika Turković
Czech Republic	Česko hledá SuperStar	TV Nova	Season 1 (2004): Aneta Langerová; Season 2 (2005): Vlastimil Horváth; Season 3 (2006): Zbyněk Drda	Leoš Mareš; Ondřej Hejma; Ilona Csáková; Eduard Klezla
Czech Republic; Slovakia	SuperStar (Česko Slovenská Superstar)	TV Nova; Markíza	Season 1 (2009): Martin Chodúr; Season 2 (2011): Lukáš Adamec; Season 3 (2013): Sabina Křováková; Season 4 (2015): Emma Drobná; Season 5 (2018): Tereza Mašková; Season 6 (2020): Barbora Piešová; Season 7 (2021): Adam Pavlovčin; Season 8 (2026): Current season	Current; Pavol Habera (1–); Ewa Farna (3, 8–); Calin (8–); Jakub Prachař (8–); Former; Leoš Mareš (6–7); Monika Bagárová (6–7); Patricie Pagáčová (6–7); Marián Čekovský (6–7); Matěj Ruppert (5); Ben Cristovao (5); Katarína Knechtová (5); Marta Jandová (1, 4); Ondřej Soukup (3–4); Klára Vytisková (4); Rytmus (2); Gabriela Osvaldová (2); Helena Zeťová (2); Dara Rolins (1); Ondřej Hejma (1)
Denmark	Idols	TV3	Season 1 (2003): Christian Mendoza; Season 2 (2004): Rikke Emma Niebuhr	Thomas Blachman; Kjeld Wennick; Henriette Blix; Carsten Krøyer
East Africa^{9}	Idols	DStv	Season 1 (2008): Eric Moyo	Lebogang Mzwimbi; Thato Matlhabaphiri; Angela Angwenyi; Trevor Siyandi; Kawesa Richard
Estonia	Eesti otsib superstaari	TV3	Season 1 (2007): Birgit Õigemeel; Season 2 (2008): Jana Kask; Season 3 (2009): Ott Lepland; Season 4 (2011): Liis Lemsalu; Season 5 (2012): Rasmus Rändvee; Season 6 (2015): Jüri Pootsmann; Season 7 (2018): Uudo Sepp; Season 8 (2021): Alika Milova; Season 9 (2023): Ant Nurhan	Rein Rannap (1–4, 6); Heidy Purga (1–2; guest judge 5); Mihkel Raud (1–5, 7–9); Maarja-Liis Ilus (3–6); Mart Sander (5); Tanel Padar (6); Jarek Kasar (6); Koit Toome (7–9); Eda-Ines Etti (7); Birgit Sarrap (8–9)
Finland	Idols	MTV3 (1–7); Nelonen (8–9)	Season 1 (2003–04): Hanna Pakarinen; Season 2 (2005): Ilkka Jääskeläinen; Season 3 (2007): Ari Koivunen; Season 4 (2008): Koop Arponen; Season 5 (2011): Martti Saarinen; Season 6 (2012): Diandra Flores; Season 7 (2013): Mitra Kaislaranta; Season 8 (2017): Anniina Timonen; Season 9 (2018): Patrik Blomberg	Jone Nikula (1–7, 9); Asko Kallonen (1, 3); Hannu Korkeamäki (1); Nanna Mikkonen (1); Nina Tapio (2–5); Kim Kuusi (2); Jarkko Valtee (2); Patric Sarin (4); Sami Pitkämö (5); Laura Voutilainen (6); Tommi Liimatainen (6); Sini Sabotage (7); Jussi 69 (7); Lauri Ylönen (7); Antti Tuisku (8); Erin (8); Jurek Reunamäki (8); Elastinen (9); Maija Vilkkumaa (9); Jannika B (9)
France^{3}	Nouvelle Star (A la Recherche de la Nouvelle Star)	M6 (1–8; 13); D8 (9–12)	Season 1 (2003): Jonatan Cerrada; Season 2 (2004): Steeve Estatof; Season 3 (2005): Myriam Abdelhamid; Season 4 (2006): Christophe Durier; Season 5 (2007): Julien Doré; Season 6 (2008): Amandine Bourgeois; Season 7 (2009): Soan; Season 8 (2010): Luce; Season 9 (2012–13): Sophie-Tith Charvet; Season 10 (2013–14): Mathieu Saikaly; Season 11 (2015): Emji; Season 12 (2016): Patrick Rouiller; Season 13 (2017): Xavier Matheu	André Manoukian (1–12); Dove Attia (1–5); Varda Kakon (1); Lionel Florence (1); Marianne James (2–5); Manu Katché (2–5); Sinclair (6–7, 9–12); Lio (6–8); Philippe Manœuvre (6–8); Marco Prince (8); Maurane (9–10); Olivier Bas (9–10); Elodie Frégé (11–12); Yarol Poupaud (11); JoeyStarr (12); Benjamin Biolay (13); Dany Synthé (13); Cœur de pirate (13); Nathalie Noennec (13)
Georgia	ჯეოსტარი Geostar	Rustavi 2	Season 1 (2006): Tinatin Chulukhadze; Season 2 (2007): Ani Kekua; Season 3 (2008): Giorgi Sukhitashvili; Season 4 (2009): Nodiko Tatishvili; Season 5 (2010): Oto Nemsadze; Season 6 (2011): Marita Rokhvadze	Marina Beridze (3–6); Levan Tsuladze (3–5); Lana Kutateladze (3, 5); Vakhtang Kikabidze (4); Sopho Khalvashi (6); Gigi Dedalamazashvili (6); Niko Nergadze (6)
Georgia	საქართველოს ვარსკვლავი Georgian Idol - Sakartvelos Varskvlavi	Rustavi 2 (1–2); Imedi TV (3–4)	Season 1 (2012): Luka Zakariadze; Season 2 (2013): Nina Sublatti; Season 3 (2018–19): Oto Nemsadze; Season 4 (2019): Tornike Kipiani	
Georgia	ჩვენ ვარსკვლავები ვართ We Are The Stars - Chven-Varskvlavebi Vart	Imedi TV	Season 1 (2017): Mananiko Tsenteradze	
Germany^{4}	Deutschland sucht den Superstar	RTL	Season 1 (2002–03): Alexander Klaws; Season 2 (2003–04): Elli Erl; Season 3 (2005–06): Tobias Regner; Season 4 (2007): Mark Medlock; Season 5 (2008): Thomas Godoj; Season 6 (2009): Daniel Schuhmacher; Season 7 (2010): Mehrzad Marashi; Season 8 (2011): Pietro Lombardi; Season 9 (2012): Luca Hänni; Season 10 (2013): Beatrice Egli; Season 11 (2014): Aneta Sablik; Season 12 (2015): Severino Seeger; Season 13 (2016): Prince Damien; Season 14 (2017): Alphonso Williams; Season 15 (2018): Marie Wegener; Season 16 (2019): Davin Herbrüggen; Season 17 (2020): Ramon Roselly; Season 18 (2021): Jan–Marten Block; Season 19 (2022): Harry Laffontien; Season 20 (2023): Sem Eisinger; Season 21 (2024): Christian Jährig; Season 22 (2026): Menowin Fröhlich	Current; Dieter Bohlen (1–18, 20–); Bushido (22–); Isi Glück (22–); Former; Thomas Bug (1–2); Shona Fraser (1–2); Thomas M. Stein (1–2); Sylvia Kollek (3); Heinz Henn (3–4); Anja Lukaseder (4–5); Andreas Läsker (5); Nina Eichinger (6–7); Volker Neumüller (6–7); Fernanda Brandão (8); Patrick Nuo (8); Natalie Horler (9); Bruce Darnell (9); Bill Kaulitz (10); Tom Kaulitz (10); Mateo Jaschik (10); Kay One (11); Mietze Katz (11); Marianne Rosenberg (11); Mandy Capristo (12); DJ Antoine (12); Heino (12); Vanessa Mai (13); Michelle (13–14); H.P. Baxxter (13–14); Shirin David (14); Ella Endlich (15); Mousse T. (15); Carolin Niemczyk (15); Oana Nechiti (16–17); Pietro Lombardi (16–17, 20–21); Xavier Naidoo (16–17); Maite Kelly (18); Mike Singer (18); Ilse DeLange (19); Toby Gad (19); Florian Silbereisen (19); Katja Krasavice (20); Leony (20); Beatrice Egli (21); Loredana (21)
Germany^{4}	Deutschland sucht den Superstar Kids	RTL	Season 1 (2012): Marco Kappel	Dieter Bohlen; Michelle Hunziker; Dana Schweiger
Greece	Super Idol	Mega TV	Season 1 (2004): Stavros Konstantinou	Elena Katrava; Konstantis Spyropoulos; Ilias Psinakis
Greece	Greek Idol	Alpha TV	Season 1 (2010): Valando Tryfonos; Season 2 (2011): Panagiotis Tsakalakos	Petros Kostopoulos (1–2); Dimitris Kontopoulos (1); Maro Theodoraki (1); Kostas Kapetanidis (1–2); Elli Kokkinou (1)
Iceland	Idol stjörnuleit	Stöð 2	Season 1 (2003–04): Kalli Bjarni; Season 2 (2004–05): Hildur Vala Einarsdóttir; Season 3 (2005–06): Snorri Snorrason; Season 4 (2009): Hrafna Hanna Elísa Herbertsdóttir; Season 5 (2023): Saga Matthildur Árnadóttir; Season 6 (2024): Anna Fanney Kristinsdóttir	Bubbi Morthens (1–3); Sigga Beinteins (1–3); Þorvaldur Bjarni þorvaldsson (1–2); Páll Óskar (3); Einar Bárðarson (3); Björn Jörundur Friðbjørnsson (4); Selma Björnsdóttir (4); Jón Ólafsson (4); Herra Hnetusmjör (5–6); Birgitta Haukdal (5–6); Bríet (5–6); Daníel Ágúst Haraldsson (5–6)
India	Indian Idol	SET	Season 1 (2004–05): Abhijeet Sawant; Season 2 (2005–06): Sandeep Acharya; Season 3 (2007): Prashant Tamang; Season 4 (2008–09): Sourabhee Debbarma; Season 5 (2010): Sreeram Chandra; Season 6 (2012): Vipul Mehta; Season 9 (2017): L. V. Revanth; Season 10 (2018): Salman Ali; Season 11 (2019–20): Sunny Hindustani; Season 12 (2020–21): Pawandeep Rajan; Season 13 (2022–23): Rishi Singh; Season 14 (2023–24): Vaibhav Gupta; Season 15 (2024–25): Manasi Ghosh; Season 16 (2025–26): Jyotirmayee Nayak; Season 17 (2026–27): Current season	Current; Vishal Dadlani (8–); Shreya Ghoshal (12–); Badshah (13–); Former; Farah Khan (1–2, 7); Sonu Nigam (1–2, 7); Javed Akhtar (3–4); Alisha Chinai (3); Udit Narayan (3); Kailash Kher (4); Sonali Bendre (4); Sunidhi Chauhan (5–6); Salim Merchant (5–6); Asha Bhosle (6, after auditions); Javed Ali (8); Anu Malik (1–10); Sonu Kakkar (10); Neha Kakkar (8–11); Himesh Reshammiya (9–11); Kumar Sanu (12)
India	Indian Idol Junior	SET	Season 7 (2013): Anjana Padmanabhan; Season 8 (2015): Ananya Sritam Nanda	Vishal Dadlani (1–2); Shreya Ghoshal (1); Shekhar Ravjiani (1); Salim Merchant (2); Shalmali Kholgade (2, during auditions); Sonakshi Sinha (2)
India	Indian Idol Marathi	Sony Marathi	Season 1 (2021–22): Sagar Mhatre	Ajay Gogavale; Atul Gogavale
India	Telugu Indian Idol	Aha	Season 1 (2022): BVK Vagdevi; Season 2 (2023): Soujanya Bhagavatula; Season 3 (2024): Nazeeruddin Shaik; Season 4 (2025): Brinda	Current; Thaman S (1–); Karthik (1–); Geeta Madhuri (2–); Former; Nithya Menen (1)
India	Tamil Idol	Sony Vizha; SonyLIV	Season 1 (2026): Current season	Current; A. R. Rahman (1–)
Indonesia	Indonesian Idol	RCTI	Season 1 (2004): Joy Destiny Tobing; Season 2 (2005): Mike Mohede; Season 3 (2006): Ihsan Tarore; Season 4 (2007): Rini Wulandari; Season 5 (2008): Aris; Season 6 (2010): Igo Pentury; Season 7 (2012): Regina Ivanova; Season 8 (2014): Nowela Auparay; Season 9 (2017–18): Maria Simorangkir; Season 10 (2019–20): Lyodra Ginting; Season 11 (2020–21): Rimar Callista; Season 12 (2022–23): Salma Salsabil; Season 13 (2024–25): Shabrina Leanor; Season 14 (2025–26): Celyna Grace	Current: Judika (9–); Rossa (6, 11–); Bunga Citra Lestari (9–10, 12–); Maia Estianty (9–11, 13–); Soleh Solihun (14–); Former; Titi DJ (1–5, 8); Meuthia Kasim (1–2); Dimas Djayadiningrat (1–3); Indra Lesmana (1–5); Indy Barends (3); Jamie Aditya (4); Agnez Mo (6–7); Erwin Gutawa (7); Ahmad Dhani (7–8); Tantri Syalindri (8); Anang Hermansyah (4–8,10–13); Ari Lasso (9–11); Armand Maulana (9); David Bayu (12); Reza "Arap" Oktovian (14) (hiatus)
Indonesia	Indonesian Idol Junior	MNCTV (1–2); RCTI (3)	Season 1 (2014–15): Johanes Tinambunan; Season 2 (2016–17): Sharon Padidi; Season 3 (2018): Anneth Delliecia	Daniel Mananta (1–2); Regina Ivanova (1); Titi DJ (1); Irvnat (1); Vidi Aldiano (2); Nola AB Three (2); Rossa (3); Rizky Febian (3); Maia Estianty (3); Rayi Putra (3)
Iraq	Iraq Idol	MBC Iraq	Season 1 (2021): Ali Leo; Season 2 (2022): Afraa Sultan	Saif Nabeel; Hatem Al Iraqi; Rahma Riad
Kazakhstan	SuperStar KZ	Current; Qazaqstan (5–); Former; Channel One Eurasia (1–4)	Season 1 (2003–04): Almas Kishkenbayev; Season 2 (2004–05): Kayrat Tuntekov; Season 3 (2005–06): Nurzhan Kermenbayev; Season 4 (2007): Oleg Karezin; Season 5 (2026): Current season	Current: Yerbolat Bedelkhan (5–); Lyayla Sultan-Kyzy (1,5–); Makpal Isabekova (5–); Former; Batyrkhan Shukenov (1); Roman Rayfeld (1); Arman Murzagaliev (1); Dariga Nazarbayeva (2); Almaz Amirseitov (2); Oleg Markov (2); Diana Snegina (2); Nagima Eskalieva (3–4); Ludmila Kim (3); Kayrat Kulbayev (3); Igor Sirtsov (3); Taras Boichenko (4); Serik Akishev (4)
Kurdistan	Kurd Idol	Kurdsat	Season 1 (2017): Jinda Kanjo	Bijan Kamkar; Kanî; Adnan Karim; Nizamettin Ariç
Latin America	Latin American Idol	Sony Channel	Season 1 (2006): Mayré Martínez; Season 2 (2007): Carlos Peña; Season 3 (2008): Margarita Henríquez; Season 4 (2009): Martha Heredia	Erika de la Vega (1–4); Monchi Balestra (1–3); Jon Secada (1–4); Mimi (2–4); Gustavo Sánchez (1–3); Oscar Mediavilla (4)
Malaysia	Malaysian Idol	8TV; TV3	Season 1 (2004): Jaclyn Victor; Season 2 (2005): Daniel Lee	Paul Moss; Roslan Aziz; Fauziah Latiff
Maldives	Maldivian Idol	Television Maldives	Season 1 (2016): Laisha Junaid; Season 2 (2017): Mohamed Thasneem; Season 3 (2018): Aishath Azal Ali Zahir	Ahmed Ibrahim (1); Ibrahim Zaid Ali (1–2); Unoosha (1–3); Ismail Affan (2–3); Zara Mujthaba (3)
Myanmar	Myanmar Idol	MNTV (1–3); Channel 9 (4)	Season 1 (2015–16): Saw Lah Htaw Wah; Season 2 (2016–17): Thar Nge; Season 3 (2018): Phyo Myat Aung; Season 4 (2019): Esther Dawt Chin Sung	Chan Chan (1); Ye Lay (1); May Sweet (1–2); Myanmar Pyi Thein Than (2–3); Tin Zar Maw (2–4); Myo Kyawt Myaing (3); Yan Aung (3); Aung Ko Latt (4); Phyu Phyu Kyaw Thein (4)
Nepal	Nepal Idol	AP1TV	Season 1 (2017): Buddha Lama; Season 2 (2018): Ravi Oad; Season 3 (2019–20): Sajja Chaulagain; Season 4 (2021): Bhupendra Thapa Magar; Season 5 (2024): Karan Pariyar; Season 6 (2025): Ganga Sonam	Nyhoo Bajracharya (1–3, 5–6); Kali Prasad Baskota (1–3, 5–6); Indira Joshi (1–3, 5–6); Sambhujeet Baskota (4); Sugam Pokharel (4); Subani Moktan (4)
Netherlands	Idols	RTL 4	Season 1 (2002–03): Jamai Loman; Season 2 (2003–04): Boris Titulaer; Season 3 (2005–06): Raffaëla Paton; Season 4 (2007–08): Nikki Kerkhof; Season 5 (2016): Nina den Hartog; Season 6 (2017): Julia van Helvoirt	Edwin Jansen (1–2); Henkjan Smits (1–3); Eric Van Tijn (1–4); Jerney Kaagman (1–4); John Ewbank (4); Gordon Heuckeroth (4); Martijn Krabbé (5–6); Ronald Molendijk (5–6); Jamai Loman (5–6); Eva Simons (5–6)
New Zealand	NZ Idol	TVNZ 2	Season 1 (2004): Ben Lummis; Season 2 (2005): Rosita Vai; Season 3 (2006): Matt Saunoa	Frankie Stevens (1–3); Fiona McDonald (1); Paul Ellis (1–2); Jackie Clarke (2); Iain Stables (3); Megan Alatini (3)
Nigeria	Nigerian Idol	Various	Season 1 (2010–11): Yeka Onka; Season 2 (2011–12): Mercy Chinwo; Season 3 (2012–13): Moses Obi-Adigwe; Season 4 (2013–14): Evelle; Season 5 (2014–15): K-Peace; Season 6 (2021): Kingdom Kroseide; Season 7 (2022): Progress Chukwuyem; Season 8 (2023): Victory Gbakara; Season 9 (2024): Chima Udoye; Season 10 (2025): Purp	Jeffrey Daniel (1–3); Yinka Davies (1–3); Audu Maikori (1); Charly Boy (2); Femi Kuti (3); Naeto C (3); Darey (4–5); Nneka (4); Dede Mabiaku (4–5); Obi Asika (6–8); Seyi Shay (6); DJ Sose (6); D'banj (7–8); Simi (7–8); 9ice (9); Omawumi (9–10); Ric Hassani (9–10); Iyanya (10)
North Macedonia	Macedonian Idol	Current; MRT(2–); Former; A1TV(1)	Season 1 (2010–11): Ivan Radenov; Season 2 (2027): Upcoming season	Current: TBA (2–); TBA (2–); TBA (2–); Former; Kaliopi Bukle (1); Igor Džambazov (1); Toni Mihajlovski (1)
Norway	Idol	TV 2	Season 1 (2003): Kurt Nilsen; Season 2 (2004): Kjartan Salvesen; Season 3 (2005): Jorun Stiansen; Season 4 (2006): Aleksander Denstad With; Season 5 (2007): Glenn Lyse; Season 6 (2011): Jenny Langlo; Season 7 (2013): Siri Vølstad Jensen; Season 8 (2014): Ingvar Olsen; Season 9 (2016): Marius Samuelsen; Season 10 (2018): Øystein Herkedal Hegvik; Season 11 (2020): Mari Eriksen Bølla	Jan Fredrik Karlsen (1–2, 5); Ole Evenrud (1, 3); Morten Ståle Nilsen (1); Lena Midtveit (1); Anneli Drecker (2); Douglas Carr (2); Thomas Strzelecki (2); Tone-Lise Skagefoss (3–4); Tor Milde (3–4); David Eriksen (3); Amund Bjørklund (4); Hans Olav Grøttheim (4); Asbjørn Slettemark (5); Benedicte Adrian (5); Mariann Thomassen (5); Bertine Zetlitz (6); Marion Ravn (6); Hans-Erik Dyvik Husby (6); Gunnar Greve (6–10); Tone Damli (7–8); Kurt Nilsen (7–8); Esben Selvig (7–8); Ina Wroldsen (9); Øyvind Sauvik (9); Sandeep Singh (9); Tshawe Baqwa (10–11); Silje Larsen Borgan (10–11); Andreas Haukeland (11)
Norway	Idol Junior	TV 2	Season 1 (2014): Mathilde Spurkeland	Alejandro Fuentes; Aleksander With; Margaret Berger; Sandra Lyng
Pakistan	Pakistan Idol	Geo Entertainment (1); Various (2–)	Season 1 (2014): Zamad Baig; Season 2 (2025–26): Hira Qaisar	Hadiqa Kiani (1); Ali Azmat (1); Bushra Ansari (1); Fawad Khan (2); Bilal Maqsood (2); Rahat Fateh Ali Khan (2); Zeb Bangash (2)
Philippines	Philippine Idol	ABC	Season 1 (2006): Mau Marcelo	Ryan Cayabyab; Pilita Corrales; Francis Magalona
Philippines	Pinoy Idol	GMA Network	Season 1 (2008): Gretchen Espina	Ogie Alcasid; Jolina Magdangal; Wyngard Tracy
Philippines	Idol Philippines	ABS-CBN (1); Kapamilya Channel (2); A2Z (2); TV5 (2)	Season 1 (2019): Zephanie Dimaranan; Season 2 (2022): Khimo Gumatay	Regine Velasquez (1–2); Moira Dela Torre (1–2); Vice Ganda (1); James Reid (1); Gary Valenciano (2); Chito Miranda (2)
Philippines	Idol Kids Philippines	Kapamilya Channel	Season 1 (2025): Alexa Mendoza	Regine Velasquez; Angeline Quinto; Juan Karlos; Gary Valenciano
Poland	Idol	Polsat	Season 1 (2002): Alicja Janosz; Season 2 (2002–03): Krzysztof Zalewski; Season 3 (2003–04): Monika Brodka; Season 4 (2005): Maciej Silski; Season 5 (2017): Mariusz Dyba	Elżbieta Zapendowska (1–5); Jacek Cygan (1–4); Robert Leszczyński (1–4); Kuba Wojewódzki (1–2, 4); Marcin Prokop (3); Maciej Maleńczuk (3); Janusz Panasewicz (5); Ewa Farna (5); Wojciech Łuszcykiewicz (5)
Portugal	Ídolos	SIC	Season 1 (2003–04): Nuno Norte; Season 2 (2004–05): Sérgio Lucas; Season 3 (2009–10): Filipe Pinto; Season 4 (2010–11): Sandra Pereira; Season 5 (2012): Diogo Piçarra; Season 6 (2015): João Couto; Season 7 (2022): Eduardo Gonçalves	Sofia Morais (1–2); Manuel Moura Dos Santos (1–5); Luis Jardim (1–2); Ramón Galarza (1–2); Laurent Filipe (3–4); Roberta Medina (3–4); Pedro Boucherie Mendes (3–4, 6); Bárbara Guimarães (5); Tony Carreira (5); Pedro Abrunhosa (5); Paulo Ventura (6); Maria João Bastos (6); Martim Sousa Tavares (7); Joana Marques (7); Ana Bacalhau (7); Tatanka (7)
Puerto Rico	Idol Puerto Rico	WAPA-TV	Season 1 (2011): Christian Pagán; Season 2 (2012): Gremal Maldonado; Season 3 (2013): Marileyda Hernández	Topy Mamery (1–3); Ricardo Montaner (1–2); Yolandita Monge (2); Erika Ender (1); Jerry Rivera (1); Milly Quezada (3); Noel Schajris (3); Elvis Crespo (3)
Puerto Rico	Idol Kids Puerto Rico	WAPA-TV	Season 1 (2012): Edgard Hernández; Season 2 (2013): Christopher Rivera	Erika Ender (1); Edgardo Diaz (1–2); Florentino Primera (1); Servando Primera (1); Ana Isabelle (2); Kany Garcia (2)
Romania	SuperStar România (SuperStar Romania)	Pro TV	Season 1 (2021): Alessandro Mucea	Smiley; Raluka; Marius Moga; Carla's Dreams
Russia^{6}	Народный Артист (People's Artist)	Rossiya 1	Season 1 (2003): Aleksey Goman; Season 2 (2004): Ruslan Alehno; Season 3 (2006): Amarkhuu Borkhuu	Evgeniy Fridlyand (1,3); Larisa Dolina (1); Anton Komolov (1); Tigran Keosayan (1–2); Laima Vaikule (2); Kim Breitburg (2); Artur Gasparyan (2); Maksim Dunayevsky (3); Gennady Khazanov (3); Alena Sviridova (3)
Saudi Arabia	Saudi Idol	MBC 1	Season 1 (2023): Hams Fekri	Aseel Abu Bakr; Assala; Ahlam; Majid Al Mohandis
Serbia and Montenegro; North Macedonia	Idol	RTV BK Telecom	Season 1 (2003–04): Cveta Majtanović; Season 2 (2005): Mina Laličić	Saša Dragić; Petar Janjatović; Biljana Bakić; Mirko Vukomanović
Singapore	Singapore Idol	MediaCorp	Season 1 (2004): Taufik Batisah; Season 2 (2006): Hady Mirza; Season 3 (2009): Sezairi Sezali	Dick Lee (1–3); Florence Lian (1–3); Ken Lim (1–3); Douglas Oliverio (1); Jacintha Abisheganaden (2)
Slovakia	Slovensko hľadá SuperStar	STV (1–2); Markíza (3)	Season 1 (2004–05): Katka Koščová; Season 2 (2005–06): Peter Cmorik; Season 3 (2007): Vierka Berkyová	Laco Lučenič (1–3); Pavol Habera (1–3); Lenka Slaná (1); Julo Viršík (1–2); Jana Hubinská (2); Dara Rolins (3)
South Africa	Idols	M-Net; Mzansi Magic	Season 1 (2002): Heinz Winckler; Season 2 (2003): Anke Pietrangeli; Season 3 (2005): Karin Kortje; Season 4 (2007): Jody Williams; Season 5 (2009): Jason Hartman and Sasha-Lee Davids; Season 6 (2010): Elvis Blue; Season 7 (2011): Dave van Vuuren; Season 8 (2012): Khaya Mthethwa; Season 9 (2013): Musa Sukwene; Season 10 (2014): Vincent Bones; Season 11 (2015): Karabo Mogane; Season 12 (2016): Noma Khumalo; Season 13 (2017): Paxton Fielies; Season 14 (2018): Yanga Sobetwa; Season 15 (2019): Luyolo Yiba; Season 16 (2020): Zama Khumalo; Season 17 (2021): Berry Trytsman; Season 18 (2022): Thapelo Molomo; Season 19 (2023): Thabo Ndlovu	Somizi Mhlongo (11–19); Thembi Seete (18–19); JR (18–19); Randall Abrahams (1–17); Unathi Nkayi (7–17); Gareth Cliff (1–12); Mara Louw (2–9); Dave Thompson (1–5); Marcus Brewster (1); Penny Lebyane (1)
South Africa	Idols (Afrikaans version)	kykNET	Season 1 (2006): Dewald Louw	Mynie Grové; Deon Maas; Taliep Petersen
Spain	Idol Kids	Telecinco	Season 1 (2020): Índigo Salvador; Season 2 (2022): Carla Zaldívar	Omar Montes (2); Edurne (1); Carlos Jean (1); Isabel Pantoja (1); Ana Mena (2); Ángeles Muñoz (2); Dioni Martín (2)
Sweden	Idol	TV4	Season 1 (2004): Daniel Lindström; Season 2 (2005): Agnes Carlsson; Season 3 (2006): Markus Fagervall; Season 4 (2007): Marie Picasso; Season 5 (2008): Kevin Borg; Season 6 (2009): Erik Grönwall; Season 7 (2010): Jay Smith; Season 8 (2011): Amanda Fondell; Season 9 (2013): Kevin Walker; Season 10 (2014): Lisa Ajax; Season 11 (2015): Martin Almgren; Season 12 (2016): Liam Cacatian Thomassen; Season 13 (2017): Chris Kläfford; Season 14 (2018): Sebastian Walldén; Season 15 (2019): Tusse Chiza; Season 16 (2020): Nadja Holm; Season 17 (2021): Birkir Blær; Season 18 (2022): Nike Sellmar; Season 19 (2023): Cimberly Wanyonyi; Season 20 (2024): Margaux Flavet; Season 21 (2025): Tuva Råwall; Season 22 (2026): Current season	Current; Anders Bagge (5–11, 13–); Katia Mosally (17–); Peg Parnevik (20–); Oliver Norqvist (22–); Former; Ash Pournouri (20–21); Alexander Kronlund (13–19); Kishti Tomita (1–4, 13–19); Nikki Amini (12–16); Fredrik Kempe (12); Quincy Jones III (12); Alexander Bard (8–11); Laila Bagge (5–11); Pelle Lidell (8); Andreas Carlsson (5–7); Daniel Breitholtz (1–4); Peter Swartling (1–4); Claes af Geijerstam (1–3)
Turkey	Türkstar	Kanal D	Season 1 (2004): Emrah Keskin	Ahmet San; Armağan Çağlayan; Ercan Saatçi; Zerrin Özer
United Kingdom (original)	Pop Idol	ITV	Season 1 (2001–02): Will Young; Season 2 (2003): Michelle McManus	Nicki Chapman; Simon Cowell; Neil Fox; Pete Waterman
United States^{6}	American Idol	Fox (1–15); ABC (16–)	Season 1 (2002): Kelly Clarkson; Season 2 (2003): Ruben Studdard; Season 3 (2004): Fantasia Barrino; Season 4 (2005): Carrie Underwood; Season 5 (2006): Taylor Hicks; Season 6 (2007): Jordin Sparks; Season 7 (2008): David Cook; Season 8 (2009): Kris Allen; Season 9 (2010): Lee DeWyze; Season 10 (2011): Scotty McCreery; Season 11 (2012): Phillip Phillips; Season 12 (2013): Candice Glover; Season 13 (2014): Caleb Johnson; Season 14 (2015): Nick Fradiani; Season 15 (2016): Trent Harmon; Season 16 (2018): Maddie Poppe; Season 17 (2019): Laine Hardy; Season 18 (2020): Just Sam; Season 19 (2021): Chayce Beckham; Season 20 (2022): Noah Thompson; Season 21 (2023): Iam Tongi; Season 22 (2024): Abi Carter; Season 23 (2025): Jamal Roberts; Season 24 (2026): Hannah Harper; Season 25 (2027): Upcoming season	Current; Lionel Richie (16–); Luke Bryan (16–); Carrie Underwood (23–); Former; Paula Abdul (1–8; guest judge 19); Simon Cowell (1–9); Randy Jackson (1–12); Kara DioGuardi (8–9); Ellen DeGeneres (9); Jennifer Lopez (10–11, 13–15); Steven Tyler (10–11); Mariah Carey (12); Nicki Minaj (12); Keith Urban (12–15); Harry Connick Jr. (13–15); Katy Perry (16–22)
Vietnam	Vietnam Idol; Thần Tượng Âm Nhạc: Vietnam Idol (1–4); Thần Tượng Âm Nhạc Việt Nam (4–7)	HTV7; HTV9 (1–2); VTV3; VTV6; VTV9 (3–8)	Season 1 (2007): Phương Vy; Season 2 (2008–09): Quốc Thiên; Season 3 (2010): Uyên Linh; Season 4 (2012–13): Ya Suy; Season 5 (2013–14): Nhật Thủy; Season 6 (2015): Trọng Hiếu; Season 7 (2016): Janice Phương; Season 8 (2023): Hà An Huy	Siu Black (1–3); Nguyễn Tuấn Khanh (1); Hà Hùng Dũng (1); Trần Mạnh Tuấn (2); Hồ Hoài Anh (2); Nguyễn Quang Dũng (3–8); Đặng Diễm Quỳnh (3); Quốc Trung (3–4); Mỹ Tâm (4–5, 8); Trương Anh Quân (4–5); Thanh Bùi (6); Thu Minh (6–7); Bằng Kiều (7); Huy Tuấn (8)
Vietnam	Vietnam Idol Kids (Thần Tượng Âm Nhạc Nhí)	VTV3	Season 1 (2016): Hồ Văn Cường; Season 2 (2017): Thiên Khôi	Tóc Tiên; Issac; Văn Mai Hương
West Africa^{11}	Idols	M-Net	Season 1 (2007): Timi Dakolo	Dede Mabiaku; Abrewa Nana; Dan Foster

=== Winner competitions ===
Region	Series title	Network	Winner	Judges
Asia^{12}	Asian Idol	India: Sony TV; Indonesia: RCTI; Malaysia: 8TV; Philippines: ABC; Singapore: MediaCorp TV Channel 5; Vietnam: HTV9	Season 1 (2007): Hady Mirza	Anu Malik (India); Indra Lesmana (Indonesia); Paul Moss (Malaysia); Pilita Corrales (Philippines); Ken Lim (Singapore); Siu Black (Vietnam)
World^{13}	World Idol	Germany: RTL Television; United Kingdom: ITV; Norway: TV 2; United States: Fox; Canada: CTV; Australia: Network Ten; Belgium: vtm; Poland: Polsat; The Netherlands: RTL 4; Arab States: Future TV; South Africa: M-NET	Season 1 (2003): Kurt Nilsen	Randall Abrahams (South Africa); Simon Cowell (representing United States, also judge on original UK show); Nina De Man (Belgium); Ian "Dicko" Dickson (Australia); Shona Fraser (Germany); Jan Fredrik Karlsen (Norway); Elias Rahbani (Lebanon); Henkjan Smits (Netherlands); Pete Waterman (United Kingdom); Zack Werner (Canada); Kuba Wojewódzki (Poland)

== Themes ==
A notable commonality among Idol-format shows is the theme logo & intro style. Many different versions of the Idol logo and show intro have been created since Idol's inception in June 2001.

=== Logo ===
The basic plan for the logo is an oval with the particular show's name centered in custom lettering based on a common font (Kaufmann). Mostly the name of the show is written horizontally, however occasionally part of the name is angled upwards.

The original Pop Idol logo featured an enhanced star in the logo. The star also appeared briefly on the American Idol logo, but was scrapped early in the Season 1 auditions.

The logo for some countries comes with an underline on the words SuperStar, or Idol, such as Deutschland sucht den Superstar, Hrvatski Idol, Hrvatska traži zvijezdu, SuperStar Hrvatska, SuperStar Arab, (Česko Slovenská) SuperStar, Hay Superstar, Nouvelle Star (until 2017), Idol Puerto Rico, Idol Kids Puerto Rico, Nepal Idol, Narodniy Artist, SuperStar România, Super Idol, Bangladeshi Idol, Idol Colombia, Ídolos Kids Brasil, Cambodian Idol Junior, Indian Idol Junior, Indonesian Idol Junior and Pinoy Idol (which also has a raised word). Türkstar has the only Idol logo not to use the common font style. As part of a relaunch after the first season, the French Nouvelle Star logo was changed to purple, and their name was shortened. They are the only logo to depart from the standard blue palette until the fifth season of SuperStar Arab changed to the same color scheme as well. Several versions such as Vietnam Idol and Chinese Idol have both English and local language titles shown in their logos.

=== 'Intro' sequence ===
Since the series debuted in 2001, this franchise has seen many variations of the opening intro. From its first creation 'Idolatry' in 2001 to its latest creation 'Hall of Idols 3.0' in 2023. Each show had its own version of the opening title from having a video length of the standard 30–35 seconds to some that even lasted as long as 5–10 seconds. The majority of the countries used the same intros at the same time and length of their release. While other franchises kept the older intros for a longer time or made their own versions. Here are some of the intros the series has seen over the years.

==== Idolatry (2001–2006) ====
The original version of the Idol intro was created by Liquid TV Graphics in London which started with the dark blue Idol logo descending on the screen. A CGI human figure appears, with arms raised, intended to be the 'Idol' of the show's name. While the Idol figure sings and then walks. Images of guitars, microphones, cameras, and airplanes flow by, representing the life of a superstar. During this, the gender of the figure alternates between male and female. Finally, the figure is again in front of the Idol logo, raising hands in victory. American Idol altered their logo in seasons 2–3, as well as displaying famous national landmarks in the first scene. They added new sound effects and replaced the jet airplanes with waving flags. The landmark and flag concepts were also used for Indian Idol and World Idol.

==== Tunnel (2005–2012) ====
In 2005, a new version of the Idol intro was created by Aerodrome Pictures in Los Angeles which first appeared on the Season 4 premiere of American Idol. The intro starts with the Idol logo without the dark blue background spinning in the American and Canadian versions while the other Idol formats have their logo glow and sparkle, next the logo zooms in featuring a long section of the CGI Idol figure riding an open elevator past large vertical screens and displays and then walking down a stylized tunnel to a stage, where the figure starts to perform. On this basic template, the American and Canadian versions are customized, with past Idol winners appearing on the screens in the American version, while the Canadian version's screens feature Canadian landmarks. The American & Canadian versions last for 30 seconds; the other Idol shows only lasts 15 seconds, with no customization and instead of the logo being 'stuck down' to the outside of the tunnel, it is pasted over the top. Also, the intro sequence for Nouvelle Star has a purple and blue color scheme instead of the standard light blue/light green.

==== Gyroscope (2008–2016, 2021–present) ====
In 2008, a new version of the Idol intro was created and introduced by BLT & Associates in Los Angeles on the American Idol 7th season finals. The intro starts with the Idol logo spinning behind a gyroscope then features real male and female Idol figures passing horizontal and arc displays then walking to an arena where the two figures start to perform. Finally, only one figure raises his/her hands in victory in front of a huge arc display and then zooms out to the atmosphere and to space, where the title of the show zooms out in front of planet Earth. The ending title of this intro is similar to the Universal Pictures logo of 1990 (for the starry background) and in 2012 (for the earth model). The American, Australian, Canadian, Croatian, Latin American, and Swedish versions are customized by featuring their past Idol winners in the horizontal and arc displays and last for 30 seconds. However, Sweden's version only displayed their former Idol winners in 2010. They also displayed their 2 remaining finalists in the intro for their 2009 finale. Other versions are also customized and last for 30 seconds without featuring their past winners. The French version lasts for 20 seconds and Norway's version in 2016 lasted 4 seconds. Some countries didn't use the Gyroscope theme, like India and Germany. India used the Tunnel theme from 2005 to 2010. But in 2012, they switched to using the 'Hall of Idols' theme. Meanwhile, Germany used the 'Tunnel' theme from 2005 to 2012. From 2013 to 2021, the German version used its own intro in place of the 'Gyroscope' and 'Hall of Idols' intros called "New Idol". Since 2021, Nigerian Idol has reverted to this opening title for their revival on Africa Magic.

==== Hall of Idols (2011–present) ====
In 2011, a new version of the Idol intro was created once again by Aerodrome Pictures in Los Angeles which first appeared on the Season 10 premiere of American Idol. The intro starts with a stage being spotted under a spotlight from the sky. Then, a stylized bridge leading towards a screen is shown. Winners of Idol, as well as notable alumni from past seasons are shown on the screen. The camera turns to a pyramid-like shape blooming and a CGI figure appears. Depending on the figure's gender in the intro, the figure would yield a different action in front of the American Idol logo and the huge "IDOL" word string (in American Idol and Indonesian Idol (not shown anymore since Season 9)). Indonesian Idol is one of the remaining Idol franchise that still use this opening sequence. The male figure raises his hand in victory and strikes a pose while the female figure raises her arms in victory before bowing down. American Idol switched between the male and female CGI figures. While most franchises that used this intro always had the male figure. However, Arab Idol, Kurd Idol and Iraq Idol always used the female figure. Vietnam Idol started using the Hall of Idols intro in Season 5, the old logo was replaced by a new one titled "Thần tượng Âm nhạc Việt Nam".

==== New Idol (2013–2021) ====
In 2013, a new version of the Idol Intro was created on the Season 10 premiere of Deutschland sucht den Superstar. The new intro begins with a mysterious person with a microphone at the mouth. As previous posting Intro male and female talents are displayed. They sing and dance on the big stage. In the meantime, always a person who appears followed a path. On that path along former candidates from earlier seasons are displayed on screens.

==== Gyroscope 2.0 (2014–2023) ====
In 2014, a new version of the Idol intro was created by The Mill in Los Angeles which first appeared on the Season 13 premiere of American Idol. The intro starts with a hole opening up. Then, the gyroscope logo comes out of the hole. A crowd cheers surroding the stage. Finally, the gyroscope logo appears with the Roman numerals "XIII" below the logo for the American version. The intro was also used in the South African version of Idol also starting in 2014 until their cancellation in 2023.

==== Idol on Street (2015) ====
In 2015, a new version of the Idol intro was created by Trollbäck + Company and appeared on the Season 14 premiere of American Idol. It starts by zooming out of a microphone on a mic stand with a spotlight coming out of it. Next you see a female CGI figure singing into the microphone on a city street with multiple microphones having spotlights come out of them. The female figure is also in front of a sunset while having other CGI figures dancing and watching the singer perform from the sidewalks. Next it cuts to an American Idol tour bus driving on the road with a line of microphones having spotlights come out of them next to the bus while having a male CGI figure in the sunset singing into the microphone. Then it cuts to a big hill with more microphones with spotlights and 4 CGI figures appear with 3 of them singing and 1 playing guitar. Finally it zooms out of another microphone with a spotlight with another CGI figure singing as the American Idol and the huge American Idol logo is titled to the left with the roman numerals "XIV" on the bottom right corner of the logo. The CGI figure at the end will also switch between a male and female figure. However, in the season finale, the intro featured the 2 remaining finalists as the CGI figures.

==== The Farewell of Idol (2016) ====
In 2016, a new version of the Idol intro was created by Spencer Tucker and appeared on the Season 15 premiere of American Idol. It starts by zooming into the American Idol logo which is surrounded by names of previous Idol contestants throughout the years. On the season premiere, it started the same and then had a montage of the previous intros that they used in reverse. They used the same intro concept on the season finale and didn't reverse the montage.

==== Hall of Idols 2.0 (2016–2017) ====
In 2016, a new version of the Idol intro was created and appeared on the Season 5 premiere of Idols in The Netherlands. It starts by panning around city buildings surrounding a stage with light beams popping out of the spotlights, then it cuts to a sign that will say the current stage of the competition. Next it cuts to a building showing the map of the country and another building showing the judges desk while the camera turns to the left and moves up. Finally, you will see a spotlight in the middle of the stage appearing with the Idols logo appearing with a female CGI figure singing as the Idol and an audience watching the Idol perform.

==== Shooting Star Idol (2018–present) ====
American Idol's revival on ABC was accompanied with a Disney-like intro starting with their Season 16 premiere. Which was created by Spencer Tucker and Rami Hachache. Possible Productions were added to the credits for seasons 18 and 19 only. It starts with several shooting stars falling from the sky before curving up and circling the neon American Idol logo with fireworks in the background at the end. This opening is much shorter than in previous years. It acts as an integrated part of a longer opening introduction in each episode rather than a standalone opening theme as in previous seasons. Ídolos (Portugal) used this intro in 2022 for their revival on SIC. Australian Idol also used this opening title for their revival starting in 2023 on 7 and 7+. Deutschland sucht den Superstar had a similar version of this intro in 2022, but they used a blue background with shooting stars.

==== 20th Anniversary Idol (2022) ====
American Idol's 20th season brought in a new intro which appeared on the season finale, created by The Other House in Los Angeles. It starts with a closeup of the logo at the top of the 2 in '20' and tracing itself with gold lines as the camera pans to the right. Next, you will see the middle of 2 and 0 panning to the bottom left of the logo. Then you'll notice the left half of the logo while it pans to the right. Finally, the camera comes in from the bottom right corner and you'll see the entire logo and then it zooms into the middle of the logo and cuts to the studio.

==== Transparent Idol (2023-present) ====
American Idol brought in a new intro which appeared on the twenty-first-season premiere. This time it was transparent. Once again created by The Other House in Los Angeles. There are 2 versions of this opening title. The first one starts with the logo appearing vertically from behind the camera and the word 'American' comes in on top of the word 'Idol' facing the left side of the screen and turns to the right as it comes in. The word 'Idol' comes in under the word 'American' and is slightly turned to the right but turns itself to the left as it forms the logo. Finally the logo faces slightly towards the left side of the screen and stays in position. The second version only has the logo coming in the frame horizontally and facing up. Next it comes down as the logo moves into the frame. Finally you'll see the whole logo sitting still in the frame.

==== Hall of Idols 3.0 (2023–present) ====
In 2023, a new version of the Idol intro was created. It appeared on Vietnam Idol's Season 8 revival, which was the remake of the original Hall of Idol intro with some differences such as the opening which became shorter, similar to 2018 ABC's Idol intro, different background color and the opening uses an English title (Vietnam Idol) instead of its traditional Vietnamese title "Thần tượng Âm nhạc Việt Nam" which was used from Seasons 5–7.

== In popular culture ==
- American Dreamz – a Universal Pictures film, a satire on pop entertainment, including American Idol
- From Justin to Kelly – a 20th Century Studios film, starring Kelly Clarkson and Justin Guarini, winner and runner-up of American Idol 2002
- Instant Star – a Canadian television series, following the life of a winner of a singing contest
- Realiti – a Malaysian television series, features the lives and secrets of contestants of a fictional reality TV singing competition
- Vina Bilang Cinta (Vina Says Love) – an Indonesian film, starring Indonesian Idol 2004 runner-up Delon Thamrin
- Idolos de Juventud – a Telemundo television series, following the lives of the contestants and promoters of a fictional reality TV singing competition
- Rock Rivals – British drama series on ITV, based on a fictional Pop Idol–style show.
- Britain's Got the Pop Factor... and Possibly a New Celebrity Jesus Christ Soapstar Superstar Strictly on Ice – British spoof of Pop Idol / The X Factor by comedian Peter Kay, screened on Channel 4, featuring the original Pop Idol judging panel (minus Simon Cowell).
- Táo Idol/Gặp nhau cuối năm 2011 – Gặp nhau cuối năm is an annual comedy produced by Vietnam Television. In 2011, the show was partially based on the format of Idol and Top Model series. It also has its own Idol's Tunnel intro with the Táo Idol logo without the dark blue background spinning similar to the American Idol and Canadian Idol's Tunnel intro.

== See also ==
- List of television show franchises

== Notes and references ==
=== Notes ===
1. Citizens of Macedonia were eligible to participate in the third season.
2. Citizens of Hong Kong, Macau, and Taiwan are eligible to participate throughout the series.
3. Citizens of Wallonia and Québec were eligible to participate in the first season.
4. Citizens of Austria and Switzerland are eligible to participate throughout the series.
5. Citizens of Cyprus were eligible to participate in Super Idol.
6. Citizens of Belarus and Ukraine were eligible to participate in the first and second season.
7. Citizens of Puerto Rico were eligible to participate in the eighth season.
8. Countries whose citizens were eligible to participate include all the member states of the Arab League.
9. Countries whose citizens were eligible to participate include: Botswana, Burundi, Comoros, Djibouti, Ethiopia, Eritrea, Kenya, Lesotho, Madagascar, Malawi, Mauritius, Mozambique, Namibia, Réunion (a part of France), Rwanda, Seychelles, Somalia, Swaziland, Tanzania, Uganda, Zambia and Zimbabwe.
10. Countries whose citizens were eligible to participate include all of the Latin American countries, with the exception of Brazil.
11. Countries whose citizens were eligible to participate include: Benin, Burkina Faso, Cape Verde, Côte d'Ivoire, Gambia, Ghana, Guinea, Guinea-Bissau, Liberia, Mali, Mauritania, Niger, Nigeria, Saint Helena, Senegal, Sierra Leone and Togo.
12. Winners of Indian Idol, Indonesian Idol, Malaysian Idol, Philippine Idol, Singapore Idol, SuperStar KZ, and Vietnam Idol participated in Asian Idol, in which the winner was determined the greatest percentage of votes.
13. Winners of inaugural seasons of American Idol, Australian Idol, Canadian Idol, Deutschland sucht den Superstar, Idool, Idols (Dutch version), Idols (South African version), Idol (Polish version), Idol (Norwegian version), Pop Idol, and SuperStar (Arab version) participated in World Idol, in which the winner was determined by the most collective points given by each of the other participating countries (similar to the Eurovision Song Contest).
