= Anastasiya Usova =

Kazakhstani singer

Anastasiya Usova (Rus: Анастасия Усова) (born 28 December 1988 in Aktobe, Kazakh, Soviet Union (present Kazakhstan)) is a Kazakhstani singer who rose to popularity after placing second in SuperStar KZ 3, the Kazakh version of Pop Idol. She had fewest votes to Nurzhan Kermenbayev.

Anastasiya includes Dilnaz Akhmadieva, Whitney Houston, and Irina Dubtsova among her main musical influences.

== SuperStar KZ 3 performances ==
Theatre Round (Day Three): Махаббат Жалыны by Madina Sadvaqasova
Top 40: Adagio by Lara Fabian
Wildcard: Бакыт Кушагында by Shamshi Kaldayakova
Top 12: Woman In Love by Barbra Streisand
Top 11: Дольче Вита by Zhasmin
Top 10: Лесной Олень by Evgeniy Krylatov
Top 9: Акапулько by Laima Vaikule
Top 8: Махаббат Жалыны by Madina Sadvaqasova
Top 7: Золотой by Dilnaz Akhmadiyeva
Top 6: Қарлығаш by Daos Interneshil
Top 5: Телефонная Книжка by Alla Pugacheva
Top 5: One Way Ticket by Neil Sedaka
Top 4: From Sarah with Love by Sarah Connor
Top 4: Февраль by Leonida Agutina & Anzheliki Varum (with Kayrat Tuntekov)
Top 3: Listen With Your Heart by Roxette
Top 3: How Could An Angel Break My Heart? by Toni Braxton
Top 2: Сенен Баска
Top 2: Любимый
Top 2: Атамекен by Roza Rimbayeva
