= Roman Aleksandrov =

Kazakhstani journalist

- Роман Александров
- Born: 19 October 1976 (age 49); Petropavl, Kazakh SSR, Soviet Union
- Citizenship: Kazakhstan
- Education: North Kazakhstan State University
- Occupations: Editor; fashion journalist; television personality; radio personality; television host; radio host; television producer; public relations specialist
- Years active: 2003–present

Roman Aleksandrovich Aleksandrov (Russian: Роман Александрович Александров; born October 19, 1976) is a Kazakh journalist, editor, television and radio personality, television and radio host, television producer, event promoter, master of ceremonies, public relations specialist, events and communications manager. He is a member of Club of Kazakhstan PR Professionals PR-шы and a former editor-in-chief of Fashion Collection magazine Kazakhstan edition (2010–2015). Aleksandrov was acknowledged as one of the most influential people in Kazakhstan fashion and fashion media.

== Early life ==
Aleksandrov was born in 1976 to Aleksandr Aleksandrov, music theory professor who trained Ruslan Butabayev, leader of the popular Kazakhstan orchestra Zaratushtra Band, and a music teacher.

In 2007, Aleksandrov earned a degree in journalism from Manash Kozybayev North Kazakhstan State University.

== Career ==
=== Television ===
Aleksandrov established himself in television by serving as news editor on North Kazakhstan bureau of Qazaqstan state broadcast television network.

In 2003, he moved to Almaty and continued his work as a reporter of the flagship evening television news program Informbureau on Kazakhstan Channel 31.

In March 2004, Roman Aleksandrov was hired in Alma Media, Dariga Nazarbayeva's mass media holding company. There he was combined duties of a reporter and culture and socialite editor of Evening News on KTK channel and Channel One Eurasia. In December Aleksandrov became the chief-editor and host of Show Boom, a daily entertainment newscast on KTK primarily reporting on celebrity news and gossip, along with social life reviews and some news about the entertainment industry in general.

Soon Aleksandrov was confirmed as an official person on KTK channel while his fame and popularity increased dramatically. Having analysed the high ratings Show Boom project had enjoyed heads of HiT TV music television channel invited Roman Aleksandrov in 2008 to executive produce its two flagship shows – Change On Demand, a makeover reality television series and In The Highlight, a television tabloid program about social life, fashion and celebrities. Aleksandrov eventually accepted and occupied multiple positions there – producer, chief-editor and anchor.

=== Radio ===
Simultaneously with television activity Roman Aleksandrov was involved in radio programs production. From 2005 to 2010, he wrote and hosted Fashion FM program on Kazakhstan radio Energy 102.2 FM.

=== Magazines ===
In 2004, Aleksandrov joined the first editorial team of Kazakhstan edition of Harper's Bazaar women's fashion magazine under Maria Podgorbunskaya's editorship and was assigned as the first culture and socialite editor.

From 2005 to 2007, Aleksandrov regularly published his columns in Kazakhstan weekly newspaper GazetaKZ.

In 2006, Aleksandrov contributed to Vintage, Kazakhstan fashion magazine serving as fashion editor.

In September 2010, Aleksandrov took over Kazakhstan edition of Fashion Collection Russian fashion magazine. Once in charge of Fashion Collection Kazakhstan Aleksandrov introduced the new concept of social events — fashion brunches. On behalf of the magazine he presided in the jury of designers' contests and appeared on other important events.

Five years later, in 2015, Aleksandrov came to decision to transfer to Vintage Kazakhstan fashion magazine. His new assignment drew everybody's attention in Kazakhstan media community. However, due to long creative disputes with Karashash Dzhuzeyeva, publisher and owner of Vintage magazine Roman Aleksandrov resigned leaving the magazine with a brand new concept, general style improvements and increase in high quality content.
