= Altınay =

- Gender: Female
- Language: Kazakh Kyrgyz

Origin
- Origin: Old Turkic
- Meaning: golden moon
- Region of origin: Kazakhstan, Kyrgyzstan

Other names
- Alternative spelling: Altinay, Altynai, Altinaï
- Related names: Altina

Altınay (or Altinay) is a given name used in Kazakh, Kyrgyz and Turkish cultures. Predominantly a female name, it is occasionally used for males as well. Altınay is also used as a surname in Turkey.

== Meaning ==
The name means 'golden moon'.

== Given name ==
- Princess Altinaï of Montenegro (born 1977)
- Altynai Asylmuratova (born 1961), Kazakh former prima ballerina with the Kirov Ballet and artistic director of the ballet company at Astana Opera
- Altynai Botoyarova (born 2004), Kyrgyz model and beauty pageant titleholder, Miss Kyrgyzstan 2021
- Altynai Nogerbek (born 1976), Kazakh film and theater actress
- Altynai Omurbekova (born 1973), vice-speaker of the parliament of Kyrgyzstan
- Altynay Sapargalieva (born 1989), Kazakh singer who placed third in SuperStar KZ 3
- Altina Schinasi (1907–1999), American sculptor, filmmaker, actress, entrepreneur, window dresser, designer; inventor of cat-eye glasses
- Altinay Sernikli (born 1942), Turkish library specialist and translator
- Altynai Temirova (born 1960), Kyrgyz poet, playwright, screenwriter, and translator
- Altynai Zhorabayeva (born 1978), Kazakh pop singer

== Surname ==
- Ahmet Refik Altınay (1881–1937), Turkish historian, writer, and poet
- Ayşe Gül Altınay (born 1971), Turkish anthropologist
- Koray Altınay (born 1991), Turkish football defender
- Metin Altinay (born 1962), Turkish former football player and coach
