= Cherkasov =

Cherkasov (masculine, Russian: Черкасов) or Cherkasova (feminine, Russian: Черкасова) is a Russian surname. Notable people with the surname include:

- Alla Cherkasova (born 1989), Ukrainian wrestler
- Alan Cherkasov, Kazakh television personality
- Andrei Cherkasov (born 1970), Soviet and Russian tennis player
- Maria Cherkasova (born 1938), Russian journalist and ecologist
- Marina Cherkasova (born 1964), Russian pair skater
- Marina Cherkasova (skier) (born 1972), Russian freestyle skier
- Nikolai Cherkasov (1903–1966), Soviet actor
- Svetlana Cherkasova (born 1978), Russian middle-distance runner
- Valentina Cherkasova (born 1958), Soviet sports shooter
- Veronika Cherkasova (1959–2004), Belarusian journalist
