= Altynai =

Altynai (Kazakh: Алтынай) or Altynay, is a Kazakh and Kyrgyz transcription of the Turkic name Altınay. Notable persons with the name include:

- Altynai Asylmuratova (born 1961), Kazakh-born former ballerina, artistic director of the ballet company at Astana Opera
- Altynai Botoyarova (born 2004), Kyrgyz model and beauty pageant titleholder, Miss Kyrgyzstan 2021
- Altynai Omurbekova, vice-speaker of the parliament of Kyrgyzstan
- Altynay Sapargalieva (born 1989), Kazakh singer who placed third in SuperStar KZ 3

== See also ==
- Altınay
