= Perviy =

Pervyi, Pervii or Pervy (Russian: Первый, first, masculine) or Pervaya (feminine) is a generic adjective added to various Russian names. It is also a surname. It may refer to

- Pervaya Liga (Soviet Union), the second level of ice hockey in the Soviet Union
- Perviy Kanal, the first television channel in the Russian Federation
- Perviy Kanal Evraziya, Kazakhstani television station
- Perviy Potseluy, debut album of Makpal Isabekova
- Oleksandr Perviy (1960–1985), Ukrainian Olympic weightlifter
