= Kayrat Tuntekov =

Kazakh singer (born 1986)

Kayrat Tuntekov Қайрат Түнтеков
- Born: February 14, 1986 (age 39) Shymkent, Shymkent Oblast, Kazakh SSR, Soviet Union
- Genres: Pop, Kazakh music
- Occupation: Singer-songwriter
- Instrument: Vocals
- Years active: 2003–present
- Labels: Premier Records

Qairat Tüntekov (Kazakh: Қайрат Түнтеков; born February 14, 1986) is a Kazakh singer who rose to popularity after winning SuperStar KZ 2, the Kazakh version of Pop Idol, shown by Perviy Kanal Evraziya. Tüntekov won in his semi final group with highest votes of 26.1% of the total vote to advance to the finals of SuperStar KZ 2. During the entire series, Tüntekov sang in five languages, Kazakh, Russian, English, Spanish, Arabic, and French.

Tüntekov was famous for being in the same semi final group as first SuperStar KZ, Almas Kishkenbayev, in 2003, but did not advance. This is the first Idol series where two or more eventual Idol winners have been in the same semi final group.
