= Pogledaj u sutra =

Studio album by Cveta Majtanović
- Released: February 2007
- Genres: Pop, Pop-rock, r'n'b
- Label: Automatik Records

Pogledaj u sutra (Look Into The Future) is the debut album by Cveta Majtanović, the winner of the Balkan Idol's first season.

It was released in February 2007 by Automatik Records, an independent Belgrade label. Pogledaj u sutra contains 11 songs. Each of them has been produced by Belgian and Poland producers, at BMG studios. The album is a mix of different genres. There is mainly pop, but funk, reggae, R&B, & soul can also be found.

== Track listing ==
#	Title	Translation	Length
1.	"Iznad tebe"	Above You	2:54
2.	"Ne želim kraj"	I Don't Want The End	3:38
3.	"Pop Trash"		3:22
4.	"Možda sam luda"	Maybe I'm Crazy	3:01
5.	"Navika"	Habit	3:12
6.	"Supermenka"	Superwoman	2:49
7.	"Pogledaj u sutra"	Look Into Tomorrow	3:31
8.	"Neću da se mešam"	I Don't Wanna Get Involved	3:08
9.	"Gde je..."	Where Is...	2:57
10.	"Autentičan"	Authentic	3:00
11.	"Sophisticated"		3:41

== Singles ==
"Pop Trash" was not released as CD single or as a video. It debuted at Feras 2006 (Serbian Radio Festival 2006), and Cveta with her management decided not to do video for this song because it debuted at festival. "Pogledaj u sutra" (Look Into Tomorrow) was released as video, not as CD single.

- "Pop Trash" (December 2006)
- "Pogledaj u sutra" (March 2007)
