= Mina Laličić =

Montenegrin singer

Mina Laličić (born 14 January 1986, Titograd, Yugoslavia (now Podgorica, Montenegro)) is a Montenegrin singer.

Laličić won Idol Season 2, the Balkan version of Pop Idol, shown by BKTV. As BKTV closed down, she didn't release an associated album.

== Idol Serbia, Montenegro and North Macedonia Performances ==
- Semi Finals: If I Could Turn Back Time by Cher
- Top 12: Steamy Window by Tina Turner
- Top 11: Call Me by Blondie
- Top 10: You're The One That I Want by John Travolta & Olivia Newton-John
- Top 9: Outra Lagar by Salomé de Bahia
- Top 8: Senke by Oktobar 1864
- Top 7: I Don't Wanna Lose You by Tina Turner
- Top 6: So Many Times by Gadjo
- Top 5: Zombie by The Cranberries
- Top 4: Change by Lisa Stansfield
- Top 4: Strong Enough by Cher
- Top 3: Laž by Aleksandra Radović
- Top 3: Hide Your Heart by Kiss
- Grand Final: Kao Da Luda Sam
- Grand Final: Sky by Sonique
- Grand Final: The Best by Tina Turner

Awards and achievements
Preceded by Cveta Majtanović	Idol (Serbia and Montenegro & Macedonia) winner 2005	Succeeded by Ivan Radenov (Macedonian Idol)
