= Mangilikke =

Мәңгілікке

Studio album by Almas Kishkenbayev
- Released: 2006
- Recorded: February 2004–June 2006
- Genre: Pop
- Length: 38:11
- Label: Meloman
- Producer: Laila Sultan-Kyzy, Nurlan Qarazhigitovtar, Sultana Qarazhigitovtar

Singles from Мәңгілікке
- 1. "Золотая Пора"; 2. "Мәңгілікке"; 3. "Суйгенім"; 4. "Ты Моя Награда"

Мәңгілікке (Kazakh for To the Eternity) is the debut album by Kazakh vocalist and SuperStar KZ winner, Almas Kishkenbayev, the album took over two years to produce and was released in late 2006. So far it has produced four singles with accompanying music videos.

== Track listing ==
1. "Мәңгілікке" – 4:08
2. "Издедім" – 4:00
3. "Золотая Пора" – 4:03
4. "Алдайды" – 4:00
5. "Суйгенім" – 3:45
6. "Ты Моя Награда" – 3:25
7. "Сағыныш" – 3:50
8. "Любимая" – 4:05
9. "Бәрібір" – 3:40
10. "Жанымда Тек Сен" – 3:15
