= Nurzhan =

Nurzhan is a unisex (though more often masculine) given name of Kazakh origin, meaning "light soul". Notable people with the given name include:

- Nurzhan Karimzhanov (born 1980), Kazakhstani boxer
- Nurzhan Kermenbayev (born 1989), Kazakh singer
- Nurzhan Smanov (born 1972), Kazakhstani retired boxer
