= Alan Cherkasov =

Kazakhstani television personality

Alan Cherkasov (Rus: Алан Черкасов) is a Kazakhstani television personality who rose to popularity as host of the third season of SuperStar KZ. Alan has also presented for channels Perviy Kanal Evraziya, 31 Kanal & HiT TV.
