= Eric Moyo =

Zimbabwean singer (1981–2023)

Eric Moyo (23 May 1981– 20 December 2023) was a Zimbabwean singer and the first winner of Idols East Africa a version of the Idol series. As part of the recording contract, Moyo was assured of US$25,000 in guaranteed album sales from the telecompany Celtel.

Moyo used the prize money to purchase an apartment and went on a vacation.

== Death ==
On 20 December 2023, Moyo was reported to have succumbed to a brain bleed after collapsing on stage during a performance with Joyous Celebration in South Africa. He was 41.
