= Makpal Isabekova =

Kazakh singer

Makpal Isabekova (Kazakh: Мақпал Абдыманапқызы Исабекова, Maqpal Abdymanapqyzy İsabekova), (born February 21, 1984, in Panfilov, Kazakh SSR, Soviet Union (present Zharkent, Kazakhstan)) is a Kazakh singer who placed sixth in the 2004 edition of SuperStar KZ, the Kazakh version of Pop Idol, shown by Perviy Kanal Evraziya.

== Biography ==
Makpal is the youngest of three children in the family. From a young age she wanted to become a singer. Her father is a painter, and her mother is a psychologist. According to his mother, she always sang different songs, and at school often took her to sing at various events. But came to study in 2002 in Almaty State University named after Abai on the financial and economic department. When did started TV project the SuperStar KZ Makpal participated in the selection and was among the final 12 contestants, but dropped out in the seventh round in January 2004. After that, she immediately began her musical career with the music producer Eric Tastambekova.

In 2005 he released her debut album «Pervyy potseluy» ("First Kiss"). Also taking part in the annual music festival "New Wave 2005" Assessment administered in Jurmala (Latvia) Isabekova brought fame and outside the country. Despite the fact that the expert jury awarded her in the first three days only in ninth place, she received the Audience Award (Gold ring with a large diamond design Stephen Ritchie) was adopted homeland with great enthusiasm and won the "Altyn Adam" on festival the "Choice of the Year" in Almaty.

== SuperStar KZ performances ==
Semi Finals:
Top 12: Un-Break My Heart by Toni Braxton
Top 11: Может, Однажды by Dilnaz Akhmadieva
Top 10: Я Зову Вчерашний Дождь by Alika Smekhova
Top 9: I Have Nothing by Whitney Houston
Top 8: Песенка Водовоза by Isaak Dunayevsky
Top 7: Sunny by Boney M
Top 6: Ещё Не Вечер by Laima Vaikule

== Discography ==
=== Studio albums ===
- Perviy Potseluy (2005)
