= Tinatin Chulukhadze =

Georgian singer (born 1991)

- Born: Tinatin Chulukhadze; August 13, 1991 (age 34); Tskhinvali, Georgia
- Occupation: Singer
- Years active: 2006–present

Tinatin Chulukhadze (in Georgian თინათინ ჭულუხაძე) born in 1991, is a Georgian Pop and Folk singer. She's been popular since 2006 when she won Geostar, the Georgian version of the Idol series. She is also known to people as Tiko Chulukhadze, the short version of her first name.

She participated in musical TV Show Bravo in 2010.
