= Almas Kishkenbayev =

Kazakh singer

- Birth name: Алмас Кiшкенбаев
- Born: 1 June 1985 (age 39); Qyzylorda, Kazakh SSR, Soviet Union
- Genres: Pop; folk
- Occupation: Singer
- Instrument: Vocals
- Years active: 2003–present

Almas Kishkenbayev (or Kishkenbaev) (Kazakh: Алмас Кiшкенбаев, Almas Kışkenbaev) (born June 1, 1985) is a Kazakh singer who rose to popularity after winning SuperStar KZ, the Kazakh version of Pop Idol, shown by Perviy Kanal Evraziya.

Almas is also the second only Idol winner who was previously a Wildcard on the show, next to Canada's Ryan Malcolm from Canadian Idol. Almas advanced to the finals as the jury's choice even though he received 3rd highest votes.

Nikolai Pokotylo – 27.4%
Aynur Shankilova – 25.4%
Almas Kishkenbayev – 14.3%

== SuperStar KZ performances ==
Kyzylorda Auditions:
Semi Finals:
Wildcards:
Top 12: You're My Everything
Top 11: Говори
Top 10: Последняя Поэма by Valeriya
Top 9: Everything I Do (I Do It For You) by Bryan Adams
Top 8: Жігіттер Жыры by Dos Mukasan
Top 7: Soli
Top 6: Беловежская Пуща
Top 5: Love To See You Cry by Enrique Iglesias
Top 5: Insatiable by Darren Hayes
Top 4: Немного Жаль by Filipp Kirkorov
Top 4: О, Махаббат by Medeu Arynbayev
Top 3: Belle
Top 3: Девушки, Как Звезды by Andrey Gubin
Grand Final: Три Волшебных Слова
Grand Final: Кен Дала
Grand Final: Love To See You Cry by Enrique Iglesias

== Discography ==
Мәңгілікке
Мой HiT #1 (My HiT #1) singing Золотая Пора (Golden Season)

Мой HiT 3 (My HiT #3) singing Мәңгілікке
