= SuperStar KZ =

- Created by: Simon Fuller
- Presented by: Nurai Mukades; Irina Kordjukova; Serik Akishev; Erik Solo; Ulpan Kuraisova; Sabina Saiakova; Alan Cherkasov; Adil Lian
- Country of origin: Kazakhstan

Original release
- Network: Channel One Eurasia
- Release: June 17, 2003 – June 30, 2007

- SuperStar KZ Finalists (with dates of elimination)
- Season 1 (2003–04)
Almas Kishkenbayev	Winner
Roman Kim	February 28
Irina Kotlyarova	February 21
Asem Zhaketayeva	February 14
Nikolai Pokotylo	February 7
Makpal Isabekova	January 31
Akmaral Dosumbekova	January 24
Milana Loboda	January 17
Aykin Tolepbergen	January 10
Gulnara Silbayeva	January 3
Yuliya Pereyma	December 27
Gayni Zhumasheva	December 20
- Season 2 (2004–05)
Kayrat Tuntekov	Winner
Alisher Karimov	March 5
Rasul Supiev	February 26
Dinara Sadvakasova	February 19
Anna Sheyder	February 12
Zhanna Raymbergenova	February 5
Bolatbek Nurkasimov	January 29
Ermek Medenov	January 22
Moldir Auyelbekova	January 15
Oleg Kim	January 8
Snezhana Pancheva	January 1
Aleksandra Khardina	December 25
- Season 3 (2005–06)
Nurzhan Kermenbayev	Winner
Anastasiya Usova	May 6
Altynay Sapargalieva	April 29
Evgeniy Gartung	April 22
Rinat Malzagov	April 15
Asem Tasbulatova	April 8
Dinara Koskeldiyeva	April 1
Zhanara Khamitova	March 25
Erlan Alimov	March 18
Anastasiya Rossoshanskaya	March 11
Ekaterina Revanova	March 4
Arstan Mirzagereev	February 25
- Season 4 (2007)
Oleg Karezin	Winner
Adylzhan Umarov	June 30
Talgat Kenzhebulatov	June 23
Ainur Nazarbekova	June 16
Anatoliy Tsoy	June 9
Mariyam Dumanova	June 2
Daulet Bolatbayev	May 19
Stepanida Basyuk	May 12
Oleg Nikitin	May 5
Albina Oganesyan	April 28	

SuperStar KZ is a reality television show based on the British show Pop Idol, which aired from 2003 to 2007 on the Kazakh television channel "Eurazıa Birinşi arnasy". The talent contest determined the best young singers in Kazakhstan by allowing viewers to vote by phone or SMS. A supplementary show SuperStar KZ Dnevnik (SuperStar KZ Diary), shown twice weekly, provided a recap of the previous show and week's events for the contestants.

SuperStar KZ was presented entirely in Russian, though Russian, Kazakh and English songs were performed. Some contestants such as Ainur Nazarbekova, Altynay and Zhanara spoke Kazakh on the show. A mix of ethnic groups, typical of the diversity in Kazakhstan, was usually represented, including Kazakhs, Russians, Koreans, Uyghurs, and Tatars.

SuperStar KZ held auditions in sixteen cities to find the best talent anywhere in Kazakhstan, visiting Astana, Taraz, Aktau, Semey, Pavlodar, Atyrau, Shymkent, Kyzylorda, Taldykorgan, Ekibastuz, Aralsk, Oskemen, Karaganda and Kokshetau, Aktobe before finishing in Almaty.

== SuperStar KZ 1 ==
=== Finalists ===
(ages stated at time of contest)

Contestant	Age	Hometown	Voted Off	Liveshow Theme
Almas Kishkenbayev	18	Qyzylorda	Winner	Grand Finale
Roman Kim	17	Temirtau	February 28, 2004	Grand Finale
Irina Kotlyarova	19	Atyrau	February 21, 2004	
Asem Zhaketayeva	16	Pavlodar	February 14, 2004	Love Songs
Nikolai Pokotylo	19	Öskemen	February 7, 2004	Famous Foreign Hits/Latin Hits
Makpal Isabekova	19	Jarkent	January 31, 2004	
Akmaral Dosumbekova		Kokshetau	January 24, 2004	Disco Hits/San Remo 80s Hits
Milana Loboda	22	Shymkent	January 17, 2004	Kazakh Songs
Aykin Tolepbergen	21	Almaty	January 10, 2004	English Film Hits
Gulnara Silbayeva	17	Uralsk	January 3, 2004	Soviet Film Hits
Yuliya Pereyma	22	Almaty	December 27, 2003	Kazakh Songs
Gayni Zhumasheva	21	Taraz	December 20, 2003	Hits of the World

== SuperStar KZ 2 ==
=== Finalists ===
(ages stated at time of contest)

Contestant	Age	Hometown	Voted Off	Liveshow Theme
Kayrat Tuntekov	18	Shymkent	Winner	Grand Finale
Alisher Karimov	18	Taraz	March 5, 2005	Grand Finale
Rasul Supiev	19	Almaty	February 26, 2005	Pop Hits
Dinara Sadvakasova	18	Ekibastuz	February 19, 2005	Rock Hits
Anna Sheyder	16	Temirtau	February 12, 2005	Songs by Toto Kotunyo
Zhanna Raymbergenova	16	Aktobe	February 5, 2005	Eastern Hits
Bolatbek Nurkasimov	16	Aktobe	January 29, 2005	Kazakh Love Songs
Ermek Medenov	20	Semey	January 22, 2005	Latin Hits
Moldir Auyelbekova	17	Taraz	January 15, 2005	The 70s and the 80s
Oleg Kim	17	Kyzylorda	January 8, 2005	Soviet Film Hits
Snezhana Pancheva	19	Ekibastuz	January 1, 2005	Film Hits
Aleksandra Khardina	16	Ust'-Kamenogorsk	December 25, 2004	My SuperStar

== SuperStar KZ 3 ==
SuperStar KZ Season 3 premiered on Channel One Eurasia on November 11, 2005.

=== Auditions ===
Over 12,000 people auditioned for SuperStar KZ Season 3 across nine cities:

- Almaty: October 7, October 8, November 1, November 2
- Aqtau: October 10, October 11
- Aktobe: October 13, October 14
- Pavlodar: October 15, October 16
- Kostanay: October 18, October 19
- Karaganda: October 20, October 21
- Astana: October 22, October 23
- Öskemen: October 24, October 25
- Shymkent: October 27, October 28

=== Top 148 ===
In November, the Top 148 successful candidates met in Almaty to perform in a three-day theatre round consisting of a chorus, duo & solo performance where eliminations would take place at each stage. During the first and last stage contestants can sing any song, during the duo stage a pre selected song was to be chosen, this included (among others) - Could I Have This Kiss Forever? by Whitney Houston & Enrique Iglesias and Махаббат Жалыны by Madina Sadvaqasova.

=== Top 40 - Semi Finals ===
Five groups of eight contestants performed every Sunday night to determine the two best singers of each group to advance to the Top 12. There was a Wildcards show or "Lucky ticket" round as it was known on the sixth week to give a last chance performance from unsuccessful contestants. Contestants sing a song of their own choice with piano and guitar backing.

==== Group 1 (January 7, 2006) ====
- Adylzhan Umarov - Ljubit' tebja by Santos & Julija Nachalova
- Ayan Birbayev - Aisulu by Bangor
- Daniar Otegen - I Believe I Can Fly by R. Kelly
- Ekaterina Revanova (from Karaganda) - Landysh Serebristyj
- Marzhan Makisheva - Lebedinaja Vernost` by Evgenij Martanov
- Meruert Musrali
- Nurzhan Kermenbayev (from Satpaev)
- Zarina Eleusizova - All At Once by Whitney Houston

==== Group 2 (January 14, 2006) ====
- Alia Abilkairova (from Almaty) - Je T'Aime by Lara Fabian
- Altynai Sapargalieva (from Zhanaözen) - The Voice Within by Christina Aguilera
- Arstan Myrzagereev (from Karaganda) - Gde Zhe Ty? by K-7
- Dauren Orazbekov (from Karaganda) - Noch' podruga by A-Studio
- Gulmira Irzhanova (from Kostanai) - Underneath Your Clothes by Shakira
- Gulmira Zakirjanova (from Kostanai) - Ömir-özen by Altinay Zhorabayeva
- Sarman Tulebaev (from Karaganda) - Belle
- Vjacheslav Balashov (from Ust-Kamenogorsk) - Neobyknovenyje glaza by Rashid Behbudov

==== Group 3 (January 21, 2006) ====
- Anastasia Rossoshanskaja (from Karaganda) - Otpusti Menja by Valeriya
- Ardak Kenzhesarin (from Pavlodar) - Alatau
- Irina Pisareva (from Pavlodar) - Vyshe Oblakov by Slivki
- Qarlyğaş Tastambekova (from Almaty)
- Marat Orazbaev (from Zhanaözen) - Razluka by 101
- Meruert Niazbaeva (from Kostanai) - I Have Nothing by Whitney Houston
- Naila Zaitova (from Almaty) - Beautiful by Christina Aguilera
- Rinat Malzagov (from Pavlodar) - Nemnogo Zhal` by Filipp Kirkorov

==== Group 4 (January 28, 2006) ====
- Daria Akparova (from Karaganda) - I Will Survive by Gloria Gaynor
- Dinara Koskeldieva (from Almaty) - Hero by Mariah Carey
- Erlan Alimov (from Kostanai) - Ty Sdelana Iz Ognja by Vadim Uslanov
- Mnash Zhanbolatova (from Almaty) - Stena by Larisa Dolina
- Timur Kalekperov (from Ust-Kamenogorsk) - Kak Ty Krasiva Segodnja by Valery Meladze
- Vladimir Kim (from Karaganda) - Vechnaja Ljubov` by Andre Makarskiy
- Zarina Beisembaeva (from Karaganda) - Mezhdu Nami Zima by Dilnaz Akhmadieva
- Zhanara Khamitova (from Karaganda)

==== Group 5 (February 4, 2006) ====
- Anastasia Usova (from Aqtöbe) - Adagio by Laura Fabian
- Anton Ivlev (from Kostanai) - Jamaica by Robertino Loreti
- Asem Tasbulatova (from Shymkent) - Jalt Etip Ötken by Asem
- Evgeniy Gartung (from Rudniy) - Tropikana-zhenshchina hina by Valery Meladze
- Irina Kononova (from Ust-Kamenogorsk) - "I Feel Good (I Got You)" by James Brown
- Marat Nigmatov (from Astana) - Serenada 2000 by Bravo
- Timur Akhmetzhanov (from Aqtöbe) - Insatiable by Darren Hayes
- Vera Kan (from Almaty) - Geroi Ne Moego Romana by Yuliya Nachalova

==== Wildcards (February 18, 2006) ====
- Anastasia Usova - Baqyt Quşağinda by Shamshi Kaldayakov
- Ayan Birbaev - As Long As You Love Me by Backstreet Boys
- Daniar Ötegen
- Dariya Akparova
- Erlan Alimov - Serdtse, Skazhi by Ivan Breusov
- Gulmira Irzhanova - Don't Speak by No Doubt
- Marat Orazbaev - Ya Eto Ty by Murat Nasyrov
- Marzhan Makisheva - Karma by Alicia Keys
- Mnash Zhanbolatova
- Naila Zaitova
- Sarman Tulebayev - Golos by Aleksandr Panajotov
- Vera Kan - Inogda

=== Top 12/Themes ===
Each week there was a common theme on which the contestants base their song choices:

- Top 12: Contestant's Choice (including special guest jury member Tomas N'evergreen)
- Top 11: Russian Hits
- Top 10: Hits From Soviet Era Films
- Top 9: Latino Hits
- Top 8: Kazakh Hits
- Top 7: Eastern Hits
- Top 6: My Idol
- Top 5: 70's & 80's Hits
- Top 4: Hits Of The New Millennium
- Top 3: Love Songs
- Top 2: Grand Final

=== Finalists ===
(ages stated at time of contest)

Contestant	Age	Hometown	Voted Off	Liveshow Theme
Nurzhan Kermenbayev	17	Satbayev	Winner	Grand Finale
Anastasiya Usova	17	Aktobe	May 6, 2006	Grand Finale
Altynay Sapargalieva	16	Aktau	April 29, 2006	Love Songs
Evgeniy Gartung	16	Rudny	April 22, 2006	Hits of the New Millellium
Rinat Malzagov	17	Pavlodar	April 15, 2006	70s and 80s Hits
Asem Tasbulatova	19	Shymkent	April 8, 2006	My Idol
Dinara Koskeldiyeva	19	Almaty	April 1, 2006	Eastern Hits
Zhanara Khamitova	17	Karaganda	March 25, 2006	Kazakh Hits
Erlan Alimov	20	Kostanay	March 18, 2006	Latino Hits
Anastasiya Rossoshanskaya	16	Karaganda	March 11, 2006	Soviet Film Hits
Ekaterina Revanova		Karaganda	March 4, 2006	Russian Hits
Arstan Mirzagereev		Karaganda	February 25, 2006	Contestant's Choice

=== Jury/Hosts ===
The jury members for the third season were:

- Nagima Eskalieva - Recording artist.
- Ludmila Kim - VJ.
- Qairat Qūlbaev - Vice president of local media firm Shahar Media Group & HiT TV.
- Igor Sirtsov - TV producer of local channel KTK.

and hosts for the third season were:

- Alan Cherkasov
- Sabina Saiakova

== Hosts ==
The show has had many hosts throughout the three seasons including:

- Nurai Mukades (Season 1 Auditions)
- Irina Kordjukova (Season 1 Liveshows & Season 4)
- Serik Akishev (Season 1 Liveshows)
- Erik Solo (Season 2)
- Ulpan Kuraisova (Season 1 Auditions & Season 2)
- Sabina Saiakova (Season 3)
- Alan Cherkasov (Season 3)
- Adil Lian (Season 4)

== SuperStar KZ Jury ==
=== Season one ===
- Batyrkhan Shukenov - Famous singer and musician.
- Roman Rayfeld - Famous music critic.
- Arman Murzagaliev - World famous violinist.
- Laila Sultanqyzy - Famous radio and TV personality.

=== Season two ===
- Dariga Nazarbaeva - Daughter of the First President of Kazakhstan Nursultan Nazarbaev.
- Almaz Amirseitov - Director of Premier Records KZ.
- Oleg Markov - TV producer.
- Diana Snegina - DJ from radio station "Europa Plus Kazakhstan"

=== Season three ===
- Nagima Eskalieva - Recording artist.
- Ludmila Kim - VJ.
- Kairat Kulbaev - Vice president of local media firm Shahar Media Group & HiT TV.
- Igor Sirtsov - TV producer of local channel KTK.

=== Season four ===
- Nagima Eskalieva - Recording artist.
- Taras Boichenko -
- Serik Akishev -

== Bottom three statistics ==
=== Season two ===
Stage:		Semi Finals						Finals										
Weeks:		11/13	11/20	11/27	12/04	12/11	12/18	12/25	01/01	01/08	01/15	01/22	01/29	02/05	02/12	02/19	02/26	03/05
Place	Contestant	Result																
1	Kayrat Tuntekov					IN												Winner
2	Alisher Karimov				IN								Btm3	Btm3	Btm2			Runner-up
3	Rasul Supiev		IN									Btm3				Btm2	Elim	
4	Dinara Sadvakasova				IN				Btm2		Btm2		Btm2	Btm2		Elim		
5	Anna Sheyder		IN								Btm3				Elim			
6	Zhanna Raymbergenova	IN												Elim				
7	Bolatbek Nurkasimov		Elim				WC			Btm3		Btm2	Elim					
8	Ermek Medenov					IN		Btm3				Elim						
9	Moldir Auyelbekova					Elim	WC		Btm3	Btm2	Elim							
10	Oleg Kim	IN						Btm2		Elim								
11	Snezhana Pancheva			IN					Elim									
12	Aleksandra Khardina			IN				Elim										

- On November 11 Oleg did not originally made the finals but replaced another contestant who withdrew as he got the 3rd most votes

=== Season three ===
Stage:		Semi Finals						Finals										
Weeks:		01/14	01/21	01/28	02/04	02/11	02/18	02/25	03/04	03/11	03/18	03/25	04/01	04/08	04/15	04/22	04/29	05/06
Place	Contestant	Result																
1	Nurzhan Kermenbayev	IN												Btm3				Winner
2	Anastasiya Usova					Elim	WC								Btm3			Runner-up
3	Altynay Sapargalieva		IN						Btm2			Btm2	Btm3			Btm2	Elim	
4	Evgeniy Gartung					IN				Btm3	Btm3				Btm2	Elim		
5	Rinat Malzagov			IN										Btm2	Elim			
6	Asem Tasbulatova					IN		Btm3					Btm2	Elim				
7	Dinara Koskeldiyeva				IN					Btm2	Btm2	Btm3	Elim					
8	Zhanara Khamitova				IN							Elim						
9	Erlan Alimov				Elim		WC	Btm2			Elim							
10	Anastasiya Rossoshanskaya			IN						Elim								
11	Ekaterina Revanova	IN							Elim									
12	Arstan Mirzagereev		IN					Elim										

=== Season four ===
Themes:
April 28: Russian Songs
May 5: World War 2 Era
May 12: Kazakh Songs
May 19: Drinking Songs
May 26: D'Artagnan and Three Musketeers Soundtrack
June 2: Songs for Children
June 9: World Hits
June 16: Song of Pepsi
June 23: Classic & Russian Rock
June 30: Grand Finale

Finals
Weeks:		04/28	05/05	05/12	05/19	05/26	06/02	06/09	06/16	06/23	06/30
Place	Contestant	Result									
1	Oleg Karezin			Btm 2					Btm 2		Winner
2	Adylzhan Umarov						Btm 3	Btm 2			Runner-up
3	Talgat Kenzhebulatov					Elim				Elim	
4	Ainur Nazarbekova					Btm 2			Elim		
5	Anatoliy Tsoy				Btm 2		Btm 2	Elim			
6	Mariyam Dumanova		Btm 3	Btm 3	Btm 3	Btm 3	Elim				
7	Daulet Bolatbayev		Btm 2		Elim						
8	Stepanida Basyuk	Btm 3		Elim							
9	Oleg Nikitn	Btm 2	Elim								
10	Albina Oganesyan	Elim									

- On May 26 Talgat was voted off but saved by the judges

Legend
Female	Male	Safe	Safe first	Safe second	Eliminated

== See also ==
- X Factor (Kazakhstan)
