= Idols (East African TV series) =

- Also known as: Idols East Africa
- Created by: Simon Fuller
- Starring: Lebogang Mzwimbi; Thato Matlhabaphiri; Angela Angwenyi; Trevor Siyandi; Kawesa Richard
- Country of origin: Kenya
- Original language: English

Original release
- Network: M-Net, DStv
- Release: April 6 – July 27, 2008

Finalists (With dates of elimination)
Eric Moyo	Winner
Nicolette Kiige	July 27
Trinah Chisanga	July 21
Adiona Maboreke	July 14
Ammara Brown	July 7
Mkhululi Bhebhe	June 30
Cynthia Kuto	June 23
Samantha Tirivacho	June 16
Faycal Birinkuzila	June 9
Christine Adda	June 2

Idols East Africa is the East African edition of the international Idols franchise. It was the second series of the pan-African version of the franchise, following Idols West Africa. The show premiered on 6 April 2008 and ended on 27 July 2008.

Several countries from eastern Africa participated in the show. These countries included Botswana, Kenya, Malawi, Tanzania, Uganda, Zambia, and Zimbabwe. Audition venues were held in each of these countries. The competition was also open to citizens of Burundi, Comoros, Djibouti, Ethiopia, Eritrea, Eswatini Lesotho, Madagascar, Mauritius, Mozambique, Namibia, Réunion, Rwanda, Seychelles, and Somalia, but would have to meet the requirements before auditioning in one of the seven audition venues.

== Themes ==
Date	Theme
June 2	African Americans
June 9	50s, 60s and 70s
June 16	New Millenium
June 23	Birth Decade
June 30	African Home Grown
July 7	My Idols
July 14	Producer's Choice
July 21	Ultimate Wishlist
July 27	Grand Finale

== Finals Elimination Chart ==
Stage:		Semi Finals				Finals								
Weeks:		05/05	05/12	05/19	05/26	06/02	06/09	06/16	06/23	06/30	07/07	07/14	07/21	07/27
Place	Contestant	Result												
1	Eric Moyo			1								Btm3		Winner
2	Nicolette Kiige			2		Btm2	Btm2		Btm3		Btm2			Runner-up
3	Trinah Chisanga				1						Btm3	Btm2	Elim	
4	Adiona Maboreke			Elim	JURY			Btm2		Btm2		Elim		
5	Ammara Brown	1									Elim			
6	Mkhululi Bhebhe				JURY			Btm3	Btm2	Elim				
7	Cynthia Kuto	2							Elim					
8	Samantha Tirivacho				1		Btm3	Elim						
9	Faycal Birinkuzila		2			Btm3	Elim							
10	Christine Adda				2	Elim								

- No real bottom three were announced on June 23. Mkhululi and Nicolette were just randomly placed alongside Cynthia in the "unsafe" group.
- No real bottom three were announced on July 24. Trinah and Eric were just randomly placed alongside in the "unsafe" candidates group.

Legend
Female	Male	Safe	Safe first	Safe second	Wildcard	Eliminated

== Voting ==
Voting was done by ranking the contestants per country and finding the average rank. This was to prevent countries with larger voting power from giving the contestants from their country an unfair advantage.
