= Igor Sirtsov =

Kazakhstani television producer and radio DJ

Igor Sirtsov (Russian: Игорь Сырцов) is a Kazakhstani television producer and radio DJ who rose to popularity as a jury member in SuperStar KZ 3, the Kazakh version of Pop Idol.

== Biography ==
Igor is the General producer of Kazakh television network KTK and has been working in television since he was 16 years old. His career has also spanned radio in which he was the first commercial Kazakh radio DJ ever in the country.
