= Freedom of speech in Kazakhstan =

2025 World Press Freedom Index Good: 85–100 points Satisfactory: 70–85 points Problematic: 55–70 points Difficult: 40–55 points Very serious <40 points Not classified

Freedom of speech in Kazakhstan is defined as the right guaranteed by the constitution of the Republic of Kazakhstan to freely search, receive, transmit, produce and disseminate information in any legal way.

The non-governmental, non-profit organization Reporters Without Borders positioned Kazakhstan 160th out of 180 in the World Freedom Index in 2016. The only countries with lower positions in Central Asia are Turkmenistan and Uzbekistan, 178th and 166th, respectively.

Since the independence of the country from the USSR in 1991, the restriction of freedom of speech has gotten worse and many opposition media have shut down.

== Restriction of freedom in Kazakhstan ==
=== Cult of personality of Nursultan Nazarbayev ===
In the summer of 2010, the first president, Nursultan Nazarbayev, of the Republic of Kazakhstan was given the status of "Leader of the Nation". Thus, the status gives the president and members of his family the following powers:

1. The leader of the nation can not be detained, arrested, brought to criminal or administrative responsibility for the acts committed by him during the period of exercise of the president's powers, but after their termination – related to the exercise of his status of the first president of Kazakhstan, the leader of the nation.
2. The encroachment on the life of the leader of a nation by law is classified as a terrorist offense. For corruption of images of the first president – the leader of the nation, public insults and distortions of the facts of his biography leads to criminal responsibility. For the assassination attempt on the president, which did not even harm his health, is the death penalty.
3. Inviolability extends to all property belonging to the First President of the Republic of Kazakhstan - the Leader of the Nation and his family members living together with him, as well as to the residential and office premises used by them, official transport, communications, correspondence, documents belonging to them

Joseph Stalin had similar powers. During the Stalinist period, Soviet propaganda created the image an infallible leader around Stalin. After Stalin's acquisition of the fullness of power with respect to him, the titles "great leader", "great leader and teacher", "father of nations", "great commander", "brilliant scientist", and "best friend of the scientists, writers, athletes, etc., " were often used and were almost obligatory in official journalism.

=== Nazarbayev's personal attitude to freedom of speech on the Internet ===
In 2016, in an interview with the TV channel Russia 24, Nazarbayev called the Internet a place where some people impose various ideas with the aim of influencing the domestic policies of states. These same individuals write comments on behalf of those dissatisfied with the state's policy: Nazarbayev considers the authors of such posts "artificially created."

The head of Kazakhstan generally did not appreciate the ability of pluralism in the network. "Hell knows. Anyone can write anything. You do not know who did this, the author will not be told there. This business is useless", Nazarbayev noted.

As a result, the president came to a rather controversial conclusion: "We must strengthen our internal Internet content so that we can be able to respond to any such trivial attacks."

=== Fighting pornography ===
The legislation of the Republic of Kazakhstan forbids the display and distribution of any pornography. This includes pornography found on the Internet and as a result, many related sites have been blocked. Sites that have been blocked include Pornhub, erotic videos and communities on VKontakte, and the magazine Maxim. Usage of image deemed pornographic in advertisements or sales promotions is considered to be a criminal offense.

=== Internet sites ===
Some video sharing and social networks are not available in Kazakhstan. The blog platform LiveJournal was blocked for in the republic from 2008 until 2015 due to statements by the politician Rakhat Aliyev. The websites Avaaz.org and Change.org were also blocked due to petitions that demanded the impeachment of president Nursultan Nazarbaayev in 2014 and 2016, respectively.

The online-newspaper Meduza was blocked after posting an article entitled “The Ust-Kamenogorsk People’s Republic: Are the Russians Waiting for ‘Polite People’ in Kazakhstan?”. This was classified as propaganda to incite ethnic discord and violate the country’s territorial integrity.

=== National security certificate ===
To increase control over the actions of the citizens, the government amended the law on "Communications", which states that for each device that has access to the Internet it is necessary to establish the appropriate certificate on a mandatory basis, starting January 1, 2016. The mandatory certificate allows the government to censor, block the websites and edit, hence, the use is not able to if the content of the site is real. The government explained that the law is necessary to protect the personal information of citizens, but in reality, it allows the country's special services to fully identify all the subscriber's Internet traffic and, accordingly, to have all access to its network activity.

=== Persecution for comments on social networks ===
There are numerous cases of instituting criminal cases for reposts, likes and comments on the social networks. The authorities justify such actions by fighting extremism and preventing the cultivation of racial or religious hatred.

== Human rights ==
=== Scanning fingerprints of citizens of Kazakhstan ===
Since the beginning of 2010 in Kazakhstan, it was proposed to introduce mandatory fingerprinting with the entry of information into the passport and identity card.

This law has already been approved and will be practiced from 2021. For refusing to scan a fine will be given.

Approximately since 2008, the use of punitive psychiatry was resumed in Kazakhstan, which can cost around $20,000 USD to diagnose "chronic neurasthenia" to lock up a person in an asylum. Earlier, punitive psychiatry was also widespread in the territory of the USSR before its collapse in 1991. The victims of punitive psychiatry were outstanding individuals such as the Nobel Prize laureate in literature Alexander Solzhenitsyn, academician and creator of the Soviet hydrogen bomb Andrei Sakharov, as well as a politician and activist Valeria Novodvorskaya.

== General Information ==
In general, the situation in Kazakhstan is described by international legal organizations and international journalists as critical and deplorable. Accordingly, obtaining political asylum in the United States, Australia and Europe for citizens of Kazakhstan is significantly easier compared to citizens of truly democratic states. All groups of the population can get political asylum and not necessarily with the presence of earlier violations of their rights.

However, the documents and the existence of precedents showing any persecution or discrimination seriously increases the chance of obtaining political asylum.

The presence of a profession and education also affects the outcome, if your true goal is to escape from the regime, and not improve your financial situation by emigrating to an economically developed state.
