= Maria Cherkasova =

Russian ecologist, journalist

- Born: 1938 (age 87–88)
- Occupations: Journalist, ecologist, and director of the Centre for Independent Ecological Programmers (CIEP)
- Known for: Coordinating a four-year campaign to stop construction of a hydro-electric dam on the Katun River

Maria Cherkasova (born 1938) is a journalist, ecologist, and director of the Centre for Independent Ecological Programmers (CIEP). She is notable for coordinating a four-year campaign in the end of the 1980s to stop construction of a hydro-electric dam on the Katun River. Cherkasova graduated from Moscow State University specializing in zoology. After her involvement in the student movement on environmental protection in the 1960s, she began to work for the Red Data Book of the Russian Federation for the Department of Environmental Protection Institute. She researched and preserved rare species until she became the editor of USSR Red Data Book. In 1988 she co-founded the Socio-Ecological Union, which has become the largest ecological NGO in the former Soviet Union. In 1991, she became director of CIEP, which arranges and drives activities in an extensive range of ecologically-related areas on both domestic and international fronts. Cherkasova later shifted her focus to children's rights protection to live in a healthy environment and speaks from both inside and outside Russia.

In her work as a scientist, Cherkasova's research is focused on unusual, endangered, animals.

In 1997, among 25 women, she was honored by the United Nations Environment Programme for "their efforts to protect the world's environment".

== Selected publications ==
- Cherkasova, Maria V. (1994). "Children and Ecologically Related Illnesses in Russia". Children's Environments. 11 (1): 3–5. ISSN 2051-0780. JSTOR 41514901.
