= Ludmila Kim =

Kazakhstani singer and VJ

Ludmila Kim (Kazakh: Людмила Ким, Liudmila Kim) is a Kazakhstani singer and VJ. She has been a member of pop-band "Duet L" in 1990s and was a jury member in SuperStar KZ 3, the Kazakh version of Pop Idol in 2006.
