= Maria Podgorbunskaya =

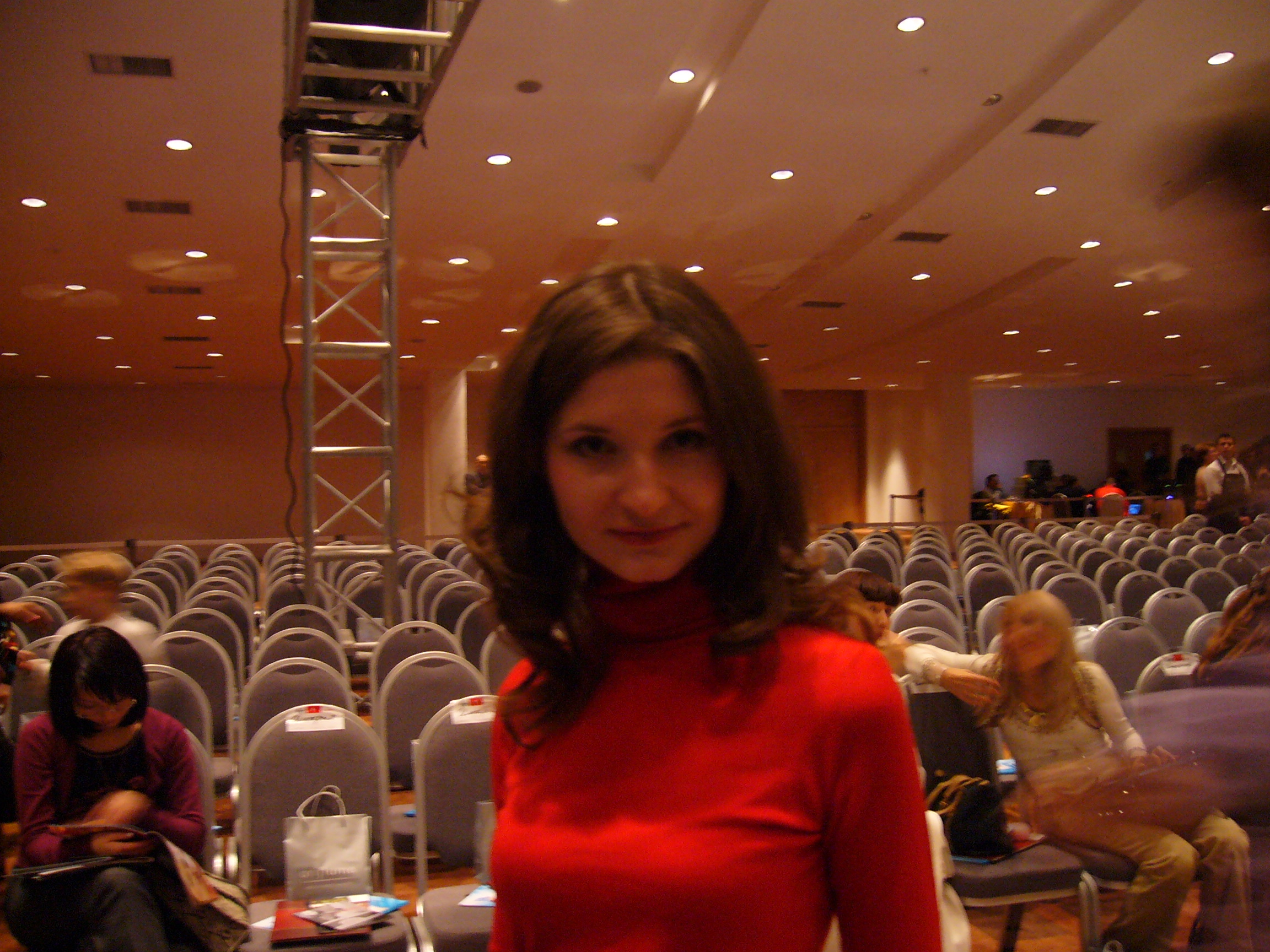
Maria Podgorbunskaya is out front at Kazakhstan Fashion Week

Maria Podgorbunskaya (Russian: Мария Подгорбунская) is the editor-in-chief of the Russian-language Kazakhstan edition of the monthly fashion magazine Harper's Bazaar.

== Life and career ==
Podgorbunskaya was born on February 1, 1980, in Ust-Kamenogorsk (modern Oskemen), East Kazakhstan where she earned a degree in English language from the Institute of Foreign Languages.

In early 2000s she moved to Almaty, the ex-capital and biggest city of Kazakhstan. There in 2003 she started her career as PR-manager, later Special Projects Manager for the fashion magazine Elite Woman, the official Kazakhstan supplement to Vogue Russia. The Managing Director of Elite Woman, Talant Soronoev also served as the acting Editor-in-Chief.

In September 2003 Podgorbunskaya was promoted to the position of Editorial Director at Elite Woman, and then in September 2004 she was offered the position of Editor-in-Chief. With her appointment the number of both pages and adverts in the magazine almost doubled. In October 2004, in the capacity of a publisher, Podgorbunskaya launched the Kazakhstan edition of Harper's Bazaar. Saule Isaeva, the Beauty Editor at Elite Woman, was named as the Editor-in-Chief. Soon after that Isaeva was relieved of her duties and the position of Editor-in-Chief was occupied by a number of different people until Podgorbunskaya herself took up the role.

Podgorbunskaya and Zhanar Mirzazhanova, the Fashion Editor at Harper's Bazaar Kazakhstan, are the only two journalists from Kazakhstan officially accredited by the Fédération française de la couture, by prêt-à-porter des couturiers and by créateurs de mode to the fashion shows in Paris.
