= Cveta Majtanović =

Cveta Majtanović Цвета Мајтановић
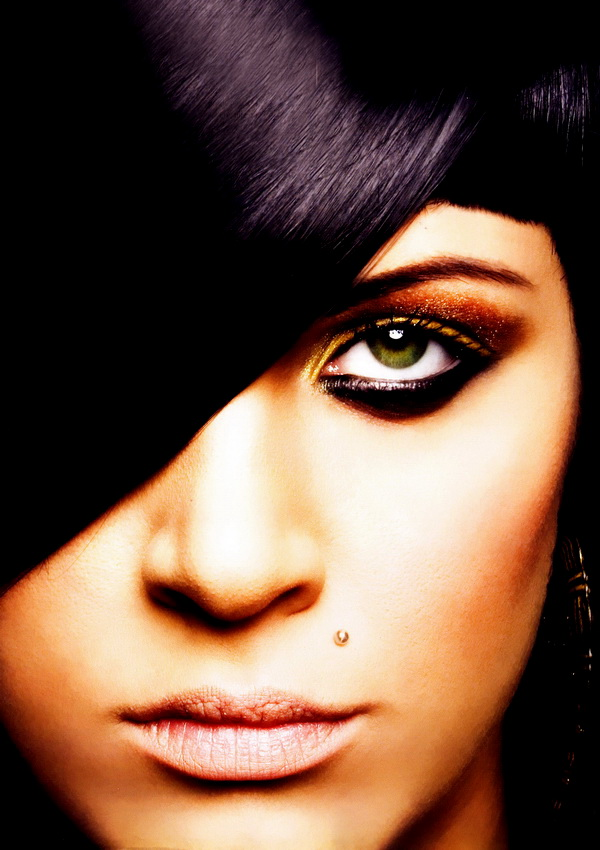

Background information
- Born: 31 March 1986 (age 40); Novi Sad, Autonomous Province of Vojvodina, RS Serbia, SFR Yugoslavia
- Genres: Pop, R'n'B, African-American music
- Occupations: Singer, ICT PhD Researcher, Business Developer, Startupper, Engineer, Psychologist
- Instruments: Vocals, Piano
- Years active: 2003–present
- Labels: Jazzboy Production of Sony BMG; Mascom Records

Cveta Majtanović (Serbian Cyrillic: Цвета Мајтановић; born 31 March 1986) recognized in the Balkans as a singer and songwriter who gained attention and popularity after winning the Idol Serbia-Montenegro & Macedonia, version of the British music competition format, Pop Idol, that became an international TV franchise (broadcast on RTV BK in 2003/2004).

== Music ==
After winning the competition on her 18th birthday, Cveta goes to England, London where she meets FremantleMedia license holders and major media sponsors, and soon after she records an EP - Nisam ista. Consequently, Cveta records both English and Serbian versions of her music album in Sony BMG Music Entertainment production studios in Poland, Warsaw signed by Bogdan Kondracki as producer.

In January 2006, it was announced that Majtanović had signed a contract with Mascom Records, exclusive partner of Warner Music Group and an official distributor for Sony BMG Music Entertainment in Serbia.

In 2008, she performed at Beovizija national selection for Serbia's representative at the Eurovision Song Contest, together with an electric quartet "Studio Alektik" and in the final they placed fourth.

Idol performances (2003/2004)

- Novi Sad auditions: "I'm Outta Love" by Anastacia
- Semi-finals: "I Learned from the Best" by Whitney Houston
- Top 10: "I'm Outta Love" by Anastacia
- Top 9: "Free" by Ultra Naté
- Top 8: "Barakuda" by Viktorija
- Top 7: "Young Hearts Run Free" by Kym Mazelle
- Top 6: "Sleeping Satellite" by Tasmin Archer
- Top 5: "Hot Stuff" by Donna Summer
- Top 4: "No More Drama" by Mary J. Blige
- Top 4: "Don't Let Me Get Me" by Pink
- Top 3: "Stop!" by Sam Brown
- Top 3: "Nađi me" by Oktobar 1864
- Grand Final: "Nisam ista"
- Grand Final: "If You Could Read My Mind" by Stars on 54
- Grand Final: "Kao so u moru" by Aleksandra Radović

== TV ==
In 2007, Majtanović hosted the show Velika trka Inđijanopolisa, aired for six weeks on FOX television in the form of a race to win tickets for the Red Hot Chili Peppers concert in Inđija. The name of the show was created by combining the name of this Municipality in Vojvodina with an allusion to the Indianapolis 500-Mile Race. The RHCP band's most tireless fans who managed to overcome complex tasks, won tickets for a big concert held the same year in this town.

At the end of 2007, Cveta moved to Zurich, Switzerland where she worked as a production director, television presenter and producer in U1 & U2 private TV Stations located in Schlieren.

In two series of the music competition "Stars", broadcast on Happy TV and TV Košava (in 2009 and 2010), Majtanović was the president of the jury.

== Radio ==
Majtanović also worked for a short time as a radio producer and host of a morning program at Radio AS FM, one of the most popular radio stations in Vojvodina and a mandatory checkpoint for all clubbing aficionados. The dedicated stage at the EXIT festival testifies to the popularity of this radio station.

== Education ==
Majtanović graduated from the Isidora Sekulić Gymnasium in Novi Sad as an excellent student.

Majtanović completed a double-degree doctorate in Information and Communications Technology (ICT), both at University of Novi Sad, Serbia, Faculty of Technical Sciences and at University of Trento, Italy. Cveta's PhD received a prestigious award from the top scientific journal in the field ACM Transactions on Multimedia Computing, Communications, and Applications (ACM-TOMM, Nicolas D. Georganas) 2020 Best Paper Award.

Majtanović previously completed Master's studies in Industrial Engineering and Management (Master paper: "Paradigm Change in Establishing the Media Agenda", Published in Proceedings XXVIII 4/2013 - Faculty of Technical Sciences).

Majtanović holds Bachelor degree in Psychology (240 ECTS), graduated on the "Psychological Profile of Reality Show Participants", Published at the XVII Scientific Meeting of Empirics Research in Psychology in 2011, at the Faculty of Philosophy, University of Belgrade.

== Business and entrepreneurship ==
In 2016, she launched her first startup, a press portal mojnovisad.com, today, the first information portal in Novi Sad and Vojvodina. In 2020, Majtanović co-founded an AI-based startup REENACT with the founders of the company CINTERACTION.

Majtanović is one of the Mentors of the Startup Laboratory within the C LAB and a Lecturer in the School of Innovation, both in Trento, Italy.

Since 2020, he has been working on a freelance basis as a consultant and mentor of the Innovation Fund within the Proof of Concept, program designed for researchers looking for support to develop their innovative product for which a market need has arisen.

== Discography ==
- Nisam Ista/Things Are Going My Way (2005)
- Pogledaj u Sutra/Look to the Future (2007)
