= Victory Gbakara =

- Also known as: Victorygbaks
- Born: Victory Gbakara; 28 July 1998 (age 28)
- Origin: Delta, Nigeria
- Genres: Christian Gospel
- Occupation: Musician
- Instruments: Vocal, guitar
- Years active: 2022–present

Victory Gbakara (born 28 July 1998) popularly known as Victorygbaks, a Nigerian singer, songwriter and an instrumentalist. He rose to fame when he won a popular Television music contest called Nigerian Idol in the 8th season.

== Early life ==
Victory is a Nigerian singer who hails from Delta state. He earned a degree in law at Benson Idahosa University and later became their music director for 2 years. He started singing in church at a young age and later went to become Nigeria Idol season 8 winner.

== Awards and nominations ==
- Nigerian Idol Season 8 winner
