= Kayrat Kulbayev =

Kazakh music producer

Kayrat Kulbayev (Kazakh: Кайрат Кульбаев, Kayrat Kulbayev) is a Kazakh music producer who rose to popularity as a jury member in SuperStar KZ 3, the Kazakh version of Pop Idol. Kayrat served as the vice president of Kazakh media firm Shahar Media Group, official partner & associate of Sony BMG in Kazakhstan, from 2003 till 2006.

== Biography ==
Kayrat used to be producer of pop music duo "Duet L" in early 1990s. He is now a producer of pop-bands "Chinatown", "Pertsy".

He is married and has two daughters.
