= Madina Saduakasova =

Kazakh pop singer (born 1979)

- Born: 8 September 1979 (age 46); Almaty, Kazakh Soviet Socialist Republic, Soviet Union
- Genres: Pop, Folk
- Occupations: Singer, Songwriter, TV Presenter
- Instrument: Vocals

Madina Bakytzhankyzy Saduakasova (Kazakh: Мәдина Бақытжанқызы Сәдуақасова, Mädina Baqytjanqyzy Säduaqasova; born September 8, 1979, in Almaty, now living in Qyzylorda, Kazakhstan) is a Kazakh pop singer who rose to popularity with the song Махаббат Жалыны. She first gained nationwide recognition in Kazakhstan in 1999 upon becoming the Grand Prix winner of the national Zhas Kanat singing contest. In 2011 she was appointed "Honored Worker of Kazakhstan".

== Biography ==
Madina has been singing since a very young age. She graduated with a diploma from the Qyzylorda Music School in the area of choral conduct. Saduaqasova was also the lead singer of Almaty-based band "Гульдер" and soloist of the Kazakh Presidential Orchestra.

In 1991, Saduaqasova was part of national singing project for young children called Anshi Balapan & participated in a similar competition called Muzikalniy Voyazh where she won twice in 1996 & 1996 in Qyzylorda & Almaty respectively. In 1999 Madina performed in and won the competitions Zhas Kanat and Aziya Dauysy & met her Favourite singer Roza Rimbayeva.

In 2004, Saduaqasova released her debut album with the title Ән Сағаным, and she still performs in many cities around Kazakhstan.

In 2011 she became "Honored Worker of Kazakhstan". In 2014 she became mentor in the first season of The Voice of Kazakhstan and in 2019 the TV presenter of the second season of the music show Topjargan on Khabar TV.

== Personal life ==
In 2006, she married a lieutenant officer whom she met in 2000 at the Presidential Orchestra. The couple divorced in 2008. Since February 2014 she has been married for the second time, to the director of Khabar TV Olzhas Smagulov. On 17 June 2014 their son Anuar was born.

== Honors ==
- Grand Prix Winner of "Musical Voyage" (1996)
- Grand Prix Winner of "Zhas Kanat" (1999)
- Grand Prix Winner of "Asia Dausy" (1999)
- Honored Worker of Kazakhstan (2011)
- Honorary Citizen of Kyzylorda (2018)
- "Female Singer of the Year" at the Eurasian Music Awards (2019)

== Discography ==
- 2004: Ән Сағаным
- 2004: Мой HiT #1 (My HiT #1) singing Махаббат Жалыны
