= Shahar Media Group =

The Shahar Media Group is now a state run media firm in Kazakhstan which has several entertainment holdings across the country. The company is run by Nurali Nazarbayev, son of Dariga Nazarbayeva and grandson of Kazakh president Nursultan Nazarbayev. Kayrat Kulbayev is vice president, and manages the company interests including local music television network HiT TV.

== Criticism ==
Independent journalists from around the world have debated the leadership of the Shahar Media Group as the Kazakh government are taking steps to control all mass media in the country, this issue was also juxtaposed with the head of "Alma-Media Group" Rakhat Aliyev who is the husband of Dariga Nazarbayeva and deputy foreign minister to Kazakhstan.
