= Idolos de Juventud =

US television program

- Starring: Héctor Soberón; Karla Díaz-Leal, Marcela Garcia
- Country of origin: United States
- Original language: Spanish
- No. of episodes: 40

Production
- Executive producer: Aurelio Valcárcel Carroll
- Running time: 60 minutes

Original release
- Network: Telemundo

Idolos de Juventud (Youth Idols) was a Spanish-language telenovela produced by the United States-based television network Telemundo. The telenovela was about a fictional pop-music reality show in Mexico. It was scheduled to broadcast in the US during the summer of 2008 airing weekdays from 7-8 p.m. with only a single 30-second commercial per episode, and instead feature pervasive product placement woven into each episode.

Telemundo was expected to air 40 episodes of the telenovela on weeknights over about eight weeks. As with most of its other soap operas. It was set to broadcast English subtitles as closed captions on CC3. Aurelio Valcárcel Carroll was the executive producer and the cast includes Karla Díaz-Leal, Marcela Garcia, Patricia Sirvent, Eduardo Cuervo and Jencarlos Canela.

== Story ==
The series features Ramón Armendariz, a handsome pop music producer who launches the careers of Mexico’s hottest singers, including that of his beautiful wife Gloria. Their combined egos wreck their relationship, however, making their marriage unhappy. As his wife's star is falling, he devises a spectacular American Idol-style reality show to find a new singing sensation.

He discovers two vivacious, passionate stars who fall madly in love on stage. Valentín is a handsome, yet determined young man from humble roots who never needs an excuse to sing. Victoria is an adorable young singer whose beauty matches her voice.

Destiny unites these two stars, but their passion faces a major test. Gloria demands Valentín’s attention, leading him to a new life that spins out of control. Love must survive the trials of fame.

== Product placement ==
Only one 30-second commercial appeared during each episode, either near the very beginning or end of the show, where it used three types of product insertion, each more expensive than the other:

- Passive integration is when a product simply appears on-camera during a scene.
- Active integration refers to a scene where a character interacts with a product.
- Storyline integration refers to a product becoming part of the show's plot.

Network executives planned signed deals for all seven packages, and writers wrote scripts that integrate the sponsor's products.

== Cast ==
- Héctor Soberón
- Karla Díaz-Leal
- Marcela Garcia
- Eduardo Cuervo
- Jencarlos Canela
- Patricia Sirvent

== Cancellation ==
The production released a teaser displaying the characters and the reality show in it known as "Idolos de Juventud" since Karla Diaz, Marcela Garcia and Patricia Sirvent, were originally a musical group called Jeans. The commitment made by them as a musical group made it difficult to start the recording of the telenovela.
