= Nurzhan Kermenbayev =

Kazakh singer (born 1989)

Nurzhan Bolatbekuly Kermenbaev
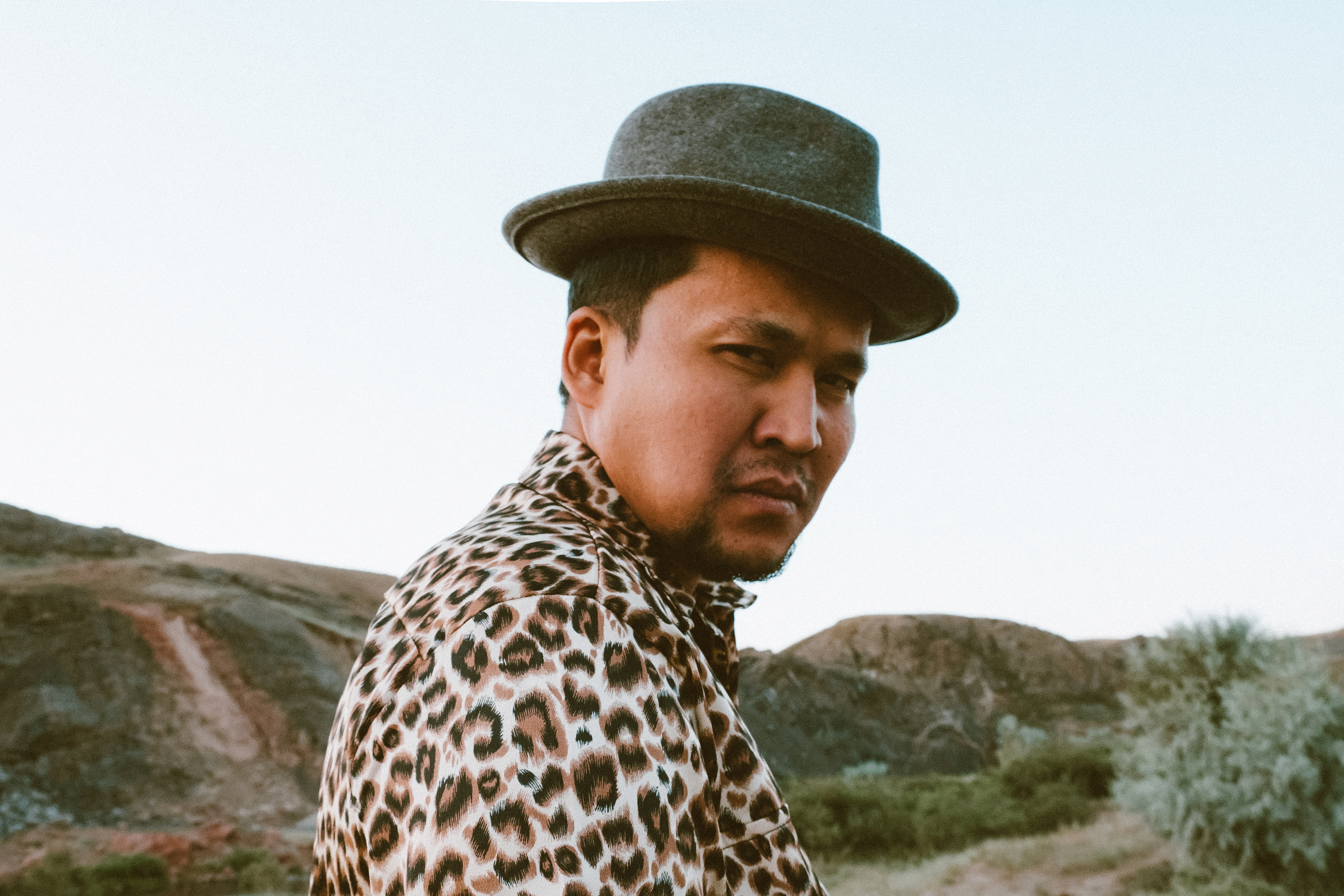

Background information
- Born: February 17, 1989 (age 36); Satpayev, Kazakh SSR (now Kazakhstan)
- Genres: Pop
- Years active: 2006-present
- Labels: Qara Bala Sound

Nurzhan Kermenbayev (Kazakh: Нұржан Керменбаев, Nūrjan Kermenbaev) (born February 17, 1989, in Satpayev, Kazakh SSR Soviet Union (present Kazakhstan)) is a Kazakh singer who rose to popularity after winning (contestant no. 360513) SuperStar KZ 3, the Kazakh version of Pop Idol. Nurzhan is known by the nickname "Капкарашка" (Kapkarashka).

== Biography ==
He spent his childhood in the village of Zhezdy, Karaganda Region. He comes from the Baganaly clan of the Naiman tribe. At the age of 17, he became the winner of the third season of SuperStar KZ. On the first day of the auditions, he performed Alla Pugacheva's hit "Love like a dream".

He left the ensemble Percy. A year and a half later in 2008, he became the lead singer of the duet "Arnau" together with the former member of the group "China Town" Zhanar Khamitova, who was replaced a year later by another vocalist - Saltanat Bakaeva.

In 2015, he presented his debut music video for the song "Alysta jursen de". In 2020, Kermenbaev launched his music label "Qara Bala Sound".

== SuperStar KZ 3 performances ==
Semi Finals:
Top 12: "Billie Jean" by Michael Jackson
Top 11: "Небо" by Diskoteka Avariya
Top 10: "Если У Вас Нету Тёти" by Aleksandr Aronov
Top 9: "Bailamos" by Enrique Iglesias
Top 8: "Мәңгілікке" by Almas Kishkenbayev
Top 7: "Aïcha" by Outlandish
Top 6: "Алдайды" by Almas Kishkenbayev
Top 5: "Words" by FR David
Top 5:
Top 4: "Desert Rose" by Sting
Top 4: "Две Звезды" by Alla Pugacheva (with Nagima Eskalieva)
Top 3: "A Song for Mama" by Boyz II Men
Top 3: "Hafanana" by Afric Simone
Grand Final: "Сенен Баска"
Grand Final: "Любимая"
Grand Final: "Отан Ана" by Batyrkhan Shukenov
