= Altynay Sapargalieva =

Kazakh singer (born 1989)

Altynay Sapargaliyeva
- Birth name: Altynay Sapargaliyeva
- Born: 30 November 1989 (age 35); Zhanaözen, Kazakh SSR
- Genres: pop, house, dance, R&B
- Occupation(s): Singer, model, dancer
- Instrument: vocals
- Years active: 2005–present
- Website: http://www.reverbnation.com/AltynayMusic

Altynay Sapargaliyeva (Kazakh: Алтынай Сапарғалиева, Altynai Saparğalieva, التىناي ساپارعالئەۆا, pronounced [ɑltəˈnɑj sɑpɑrʁɑləjevˈnɑ]; born 30 November 1989) is a Kazakh singer who placed third in SuperStar KZ 3.

As a child, she sang a member of the girl's group Chinatown. She has performed in the Kazakh teen competition "Anshi Balapan", the "Jakhan Dala" competition in Aqtau, and the New Wave competition in Jurmala, Latvia.

Sapargaliyeva moved to New York City in 2010.
