= Altynai Omurbekova =

Kyrgyz politician (born 1973)

Altynai Omurbekova (born in 1973 in Frunze) is a Kyrgyz politician. She was the vice-speaker of the parliament of Kyrgyzstan. She was deputy prime minister from 2018 to 2020.
