= HiT TV =

Television station in Kazakhstan

Hit TV is a local Kazakh television channel that has been start since 7:00 AM (Alma-Ata Time) on October 21, 2003. It's a dedicated youth oriented music television network showing all the latest music videos from Kazakhstan and abroad. Like many other national music video networks, Hit TV also has regular "show business" programs featuring music and movie gossip from around the world. Hit TV is owned by the Shahar Media Group.

== List of programmes broadcast on Hit TV ==
- Personalny Play*List - A music video request show featuring viewer interaction.
- Headliner - presents the latest news from the music industry.
- SuperStar KZ Dnevnik - The video diaries of the finalists from Kazakh version of Pop Idol.
- Mobilnaya 20 - A countdown show featuring the Top 20 music video ringtone downloads.
- P.O.P.S.A - A show where viewers can vote for their favourite music video in a countdown style program.
- DOM-2 - A program featuring music videos of comfort & love.
- SMS chat.kz - The newest program, an open music video request show featuring SMS tickers.
- Ya krasivaya - A modeling reality competition.

== VJ roster ==
- Marina
- Adil Liyan
- Kazbek
- Marat
- Alena
- Ivan

== Trivia ==
- The first music video ever broadcast on the channel was DJ Bobo's Chihuahua.
- Three compilation CDs have been released by the network in association with Kazakh online retailer hit.kz: Мой HiT #1, Мой HiT #3 & Dom-2

Old logo (HiT TV)
