= Channel One Eurasia =

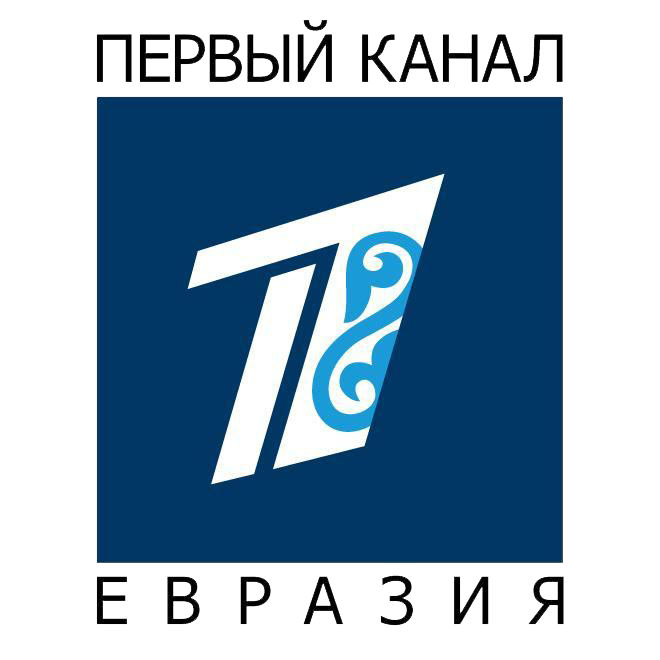
- Country: Kazakhstan
- Broadcast area: Central Asia
- Headquarters: Astana, Kazakhstan

Programming
- Languages: Kazakh; Russian
- Picture format: 4:3 (1997—2015); 16:9 (s 2015)

Ownership
- Owner: Sergey Kiselev (2007—2010; 2012—2024)
- Sister channels: Channel One Russia

History
- Launched: 10 November 1997; 28 years ago
- Replaced: ORT (Channel One Russia) (in Kazakhstan)
- Former names: ORT Kazakhstan (1997—2002); Eurasia (2002—2009)

Links
- Website: www.1tv.kz

Availability

Terrestrial
- Digital terrestrial television: Channel 7 (Kazakhstan)

Channel One Eurasia (Kazakh: Еуразия Бірінші арнасы/Eurazia Bırınşı Arnasy, Russian: Первый Канал Евразия/ Pervy Kanal Evrazia) is a local Kazakh television station that has been in operation since October 1997. It is one of many privately owned television stations in Kazakhstan closely monitored for any bad press about the Kazakh government.

== History ==
In 2011, it premiered the local version of The X Factor.

On 23 April 2012, the channel started airing its news bulletins, in Russian and Kazakh languages.

== List of programmes broadcast on Perviy Kanal Evraziya ==
=== Information ===
There are frequent news broadcasts throughout the day including news, sport & weather.

- Dobroe Utro, Kazakhstan!, (Russian News) every morning at 09:00.
- News Every Morning at 10:00. Every Night at 18:00.
- Sport Every Saturday 21:00
- SPORT 3 Every Night 21:00 an Every Morning 15:00

=== Culture and entertainment ===
Many Russian serials are aired often during the week.

- The Simpsons Entertainment Version Show
- SuperStar KZ, the Kazakh version of Pop Idol.
- Povtornaya Zagruzka, a drama series.
- Muzhchiny Ne Plachut, a crime drama series.

=== Imported shows ===
Channel One Eurasia broadcasts many western documentaries, box office films & Russian talk shows.

=== Former children's shows ===
Note: during the 2000s Channel One Eurasia have deals from TV Loonland and Sony Pictures Television (MiB only) for broadcasting their library content.

- Fat Dog Mendoza
- Letters from Felix
- Redwall
- Pettson and Findus
- Men in Black: The Animated Series
