= List of Idols winners =

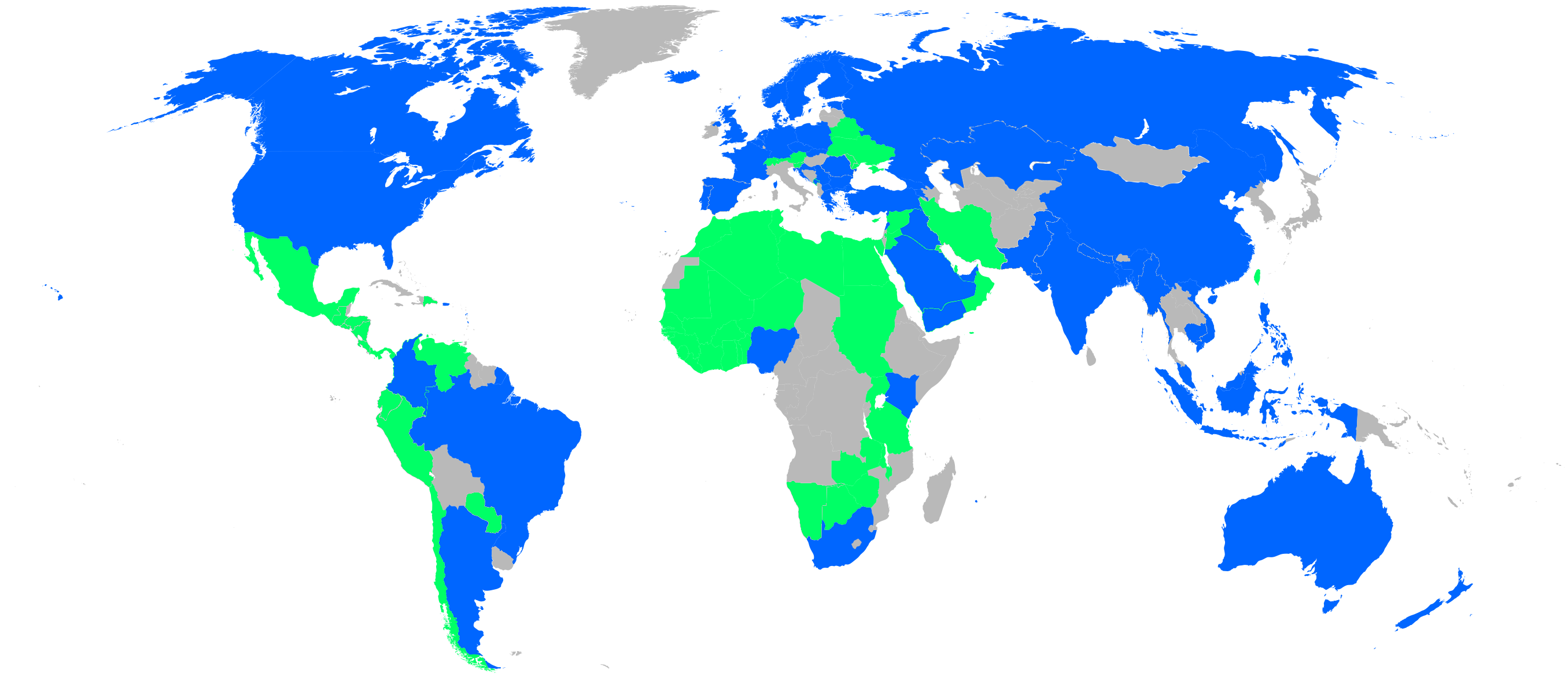
Countries that have their own versions of Idols. Countries that film their own versions are in blue, while those that take part in a series with other countries are in green.

A total of 367 artists have won Idols, a televised reality singing competition franchise adapted across the world. The franchise, created by British television executive Simon Fuller as Pop Idol, aims to find the most outstanding solo singer. The format typically consists of a panel of judges selecting a group of contestants through mass auditions, with finalists chosen from this group—either through viewer voting, judges' votes, or a combination of both—and performing during weekly live shows in front of an audience. Over the course of the live shows, the group of contestants is gradually narrowed down to a select few, primarily or entirely through viewer voting. The winner is the finalist who receives the most votes during the final show's voting period.

Prizes for winners vary among editions of the franchise and typically include a recording contract and a monetary prize. Winning an Idols series provides a unique opportunity for an artist to launch or further a music career because of the surrounding publicity and recording contract offerings, though celebrity status and success in the industry tend to vary among winners. The first winner of the franchise was Will Young, who won the first season of Pop Idol on 9 February 2002. Kelly Clarkson, who won the first season of American Idol later that year, is widely considered the franchise's most successful artist, having since sold over 70 million records worldwide. Other winners who have charted internationally include Young, Alexander Klaws, Kurt Nilsen, Guy Sebastian, Carrie Underwood, and Agnes Carlsson.

== Winners ==
=== 2000s ===
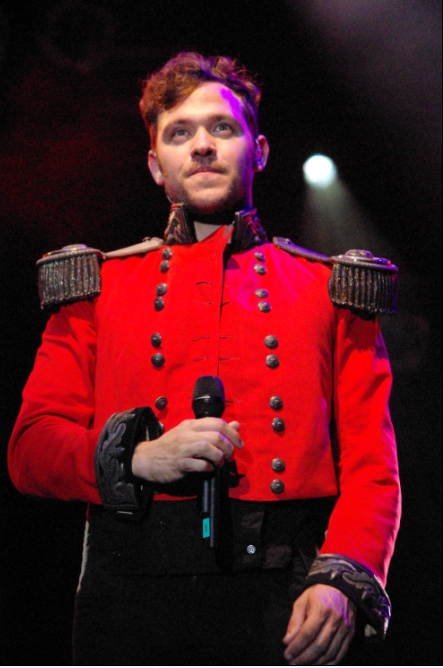
Will Young, who won the first season of Pop Idol in 2002, was the first winner of Idols format.

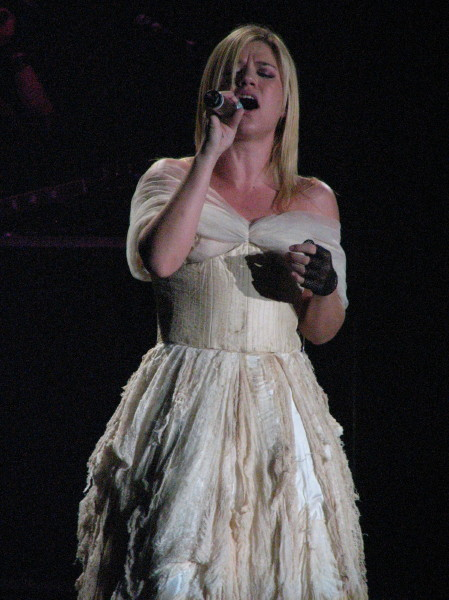
Kelly Clarkson, who won the first season of American Idol in 2002, is the most successful winner worldwide.

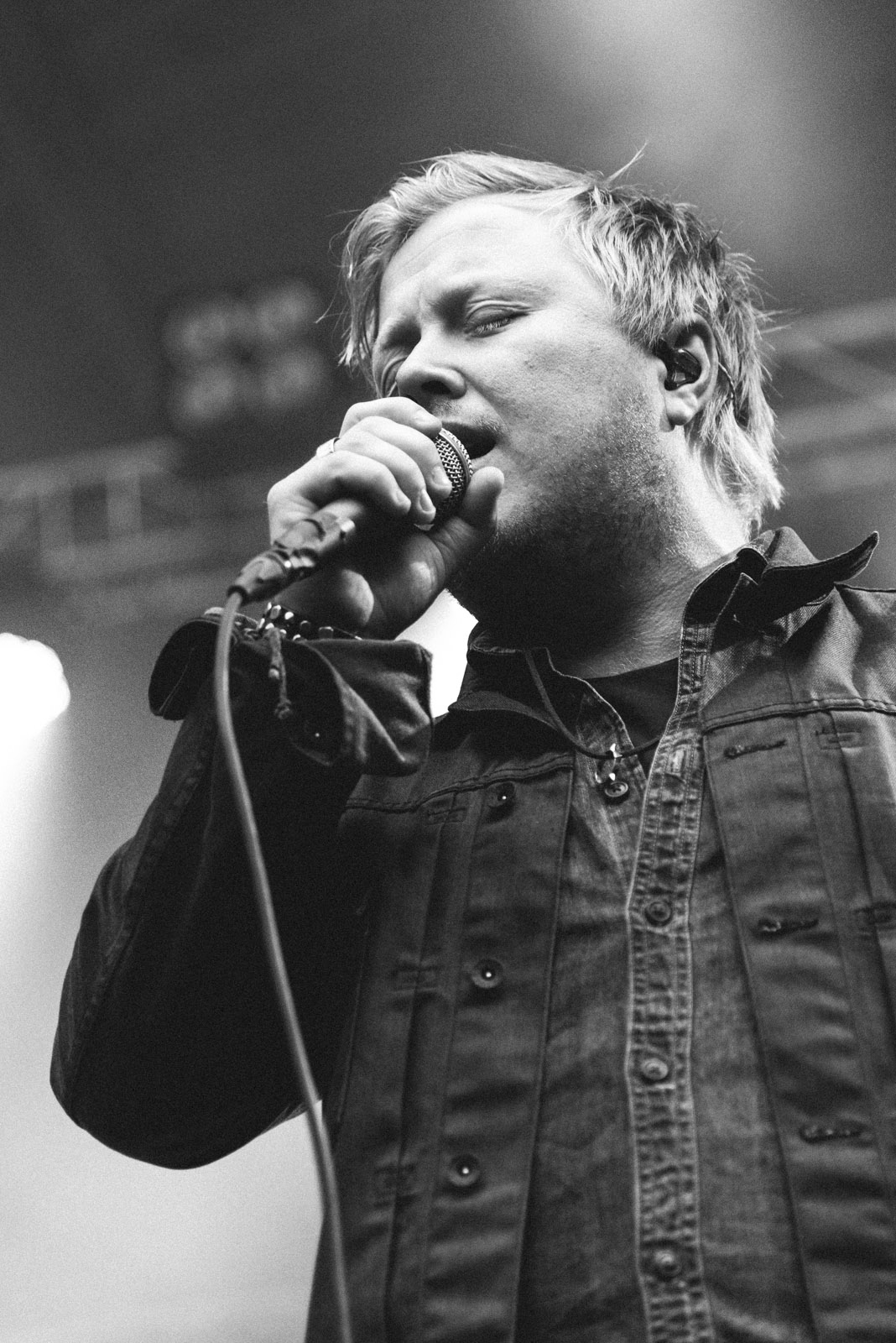
Kurt Nilsen, the first winner of Norway's version of Idol in 2003, also won World Idol.

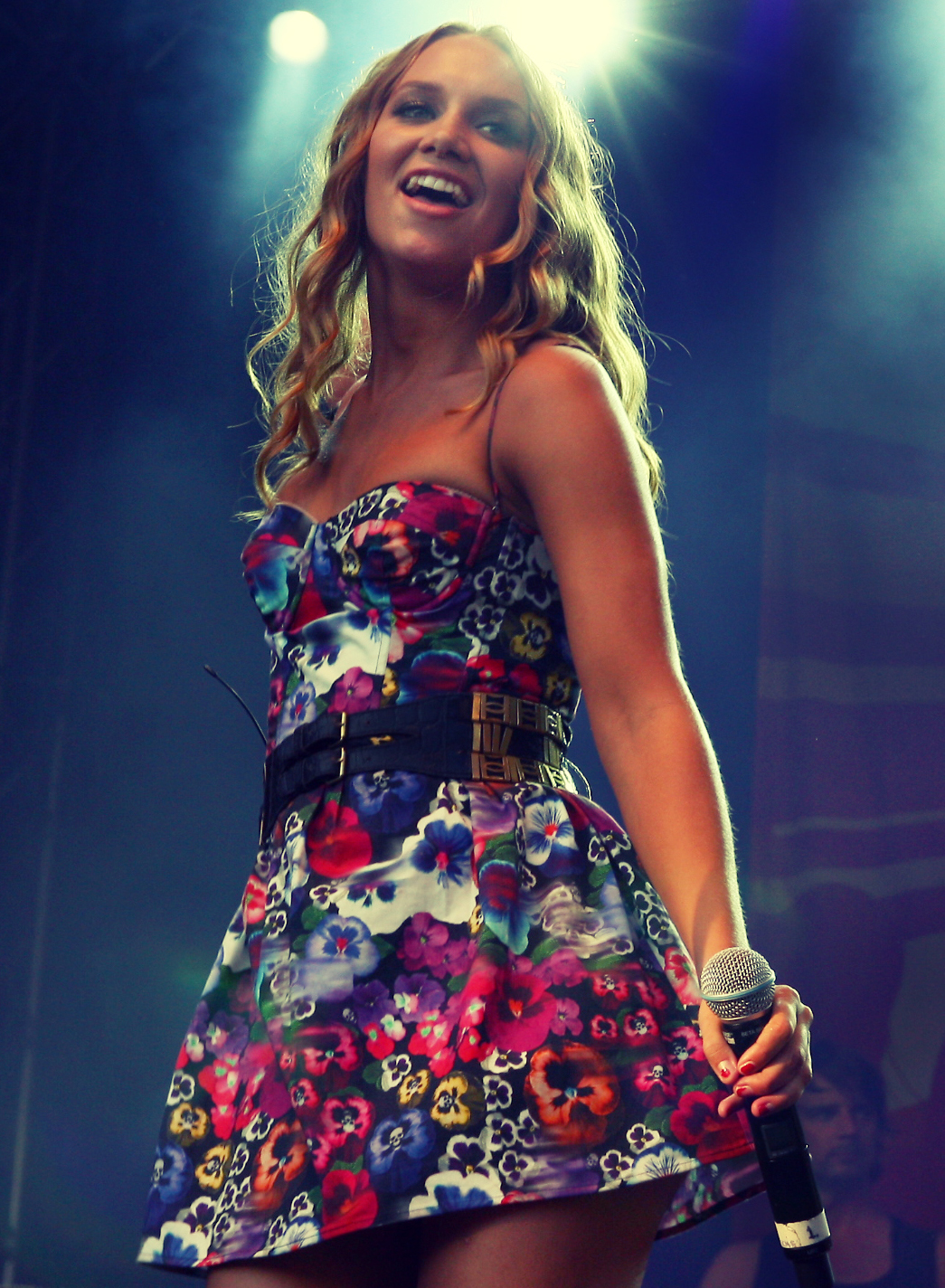
Agnes Carlsson became a finalist on Swedish Idol's second season as the judges' wildcard after initially not being selected by the viewer vote during qualifying week. She ultimately won the competition and later recorded the internationally-charting single "Release Me".

Initially announced as the runner-up of season 5 of South Africa's Idols in 2009, Jason Hartman was discovered to have received the most votes during the final following a recount. The CEO of the show's network ultimately decided to crown both him and Sasha-Lee Davids—who had been announced as the winner following the initial erroneous vote count—as joint winners.

#	Winner	Season	Date	Reference
1	Will Young	Pop Idol 1	9 February 2002	
2	Heinz Winckler	Idols (South Africa) 1	16 June 2002	
3	Alicja Janosz	Idol (Poland) 1	30 June 2002	
4	Kelly Clarkson	American Idol 1	4 September 2002	
5	Krzysztof Zalewski	Idol (Poland) 2	15 February 2003	
6	Jamai Loman	Idols (Netherlands) 1	8 March 2003	
7	Alexander Klaws	Deutschland sucht den Superstar 1	9 March 2003	
8	Peter Evrard	Idool 1	9 May 2003	
9	Ruben Studdard	American Idol 2	21 May 2003	
10	Kurt Nilsen (Note: Nilsen also won World Idol, a competition between winners, on 1 January 2004.)	Idol (Norway) 1	23 May 2003	
11	Jonatan Cerrada	Nouvelle Star 1	10 July 2003	
12	Diana Karazon	SuperStar (Arab world) 1	18 August 2003	
13	Ryan Malcolm	Canadian Idol 1	16 September 2003	
14	Anke Pietrangeli	Idols (South Africa) 2	19 October 2003	
15	Guy Sebastian	Australian Idol 1	19 November 2003	
16	Aleksey Goman	Narodniy Artist 1	11 December 2003	
17	Christian Mendoza	Idols (Denmark) 1	17 December 2003	
18	Michelle McManus	Pop Idol 2	20 December 2003	
19	Nuno Norte	Ídolos (Portugal) 1	2 January 2004	
20	Monika Brodka	Idol (Poland) 3	4 January 2004	
21	Hanna Pakarinen	Idols (Finland) 1	9 January 2004	
22	Kalli Bjarni	Idol (Iceland) 1	16 January 2004	
23	Almas Kishkenbayev	SuperStar KZ 1	28 February 2004	
24	Elli Erl	Deutschland sucht den Superstar 2	14 March 2004	
25	Cveta Majtanović	Idol (Serbia & Montenegro) 1	31 March 2004	
26	Boris Titulaer	Idols (Netherlands) 2	1 May 2004	
27	Ben Lummis	NZ Idol 1	10 May 2004	
28	Steeve Estatof	Nouvelle Star 2	13 May 2004	
29	Kjartan Salvesen	Idol (Norway) 2	14 May 2004	
30	Fantasia Barrino	American Idol 3	26 May 2004	
31	Žanamari Lalić	Hrvatski Idol 1	5 June 2004	
32	Stavros Konstantinou	Super Idol	17 June 2004	
33	Emrah Keskin	Türkstar	19 June 2004	
34	Aneta Langerová	Česko hledá SuperStar 1	20 June 2004	
35	Ayman Alatar	SuperStar (Arab world) 2	29 August 2004	
36	Joy Tobing	Indonesian Idol 1	4 September 2004	
37	Kalan Porter	Canadian Idol 2	16 September 2004	
38	Jaclyn Victor	Malaysian Idol 1	9 October 2004	
39	Rikke Emma Niebuhr	Idols (Denmark) 2	16 November 2004	
40	Casey Donovan	Australian Idol 2	21 November 2004	
41	Daniel Lindström	Idol (Sweden) 1	26 November 2004	
42	Taufik Batisah	Singapore Idol 1	1 December 2004	
43	Joeri Fransen	Idool 2	12 December 2004	
44	Ruslan Alehno	Narodniy Artist 2	19 December 2004	
45	Sérgio Lucas	Ídolos (Portugal) 2	15 January 2005	
46	Patrick Jurdić	Hrvatski Idol 2	26 February 2005	
47	Abhijeet Sawant	Indian Idol 1	5 March 2005	
48	Kayrat Tuntekov	SuperStar KZ 2	5 March 2005	
49	Hildur Vala Einarsdóttir	Idol (Iceland) 2	11 March 2005	
50	Katka Koščová	Slovensko hľadá SuperStar 1	16 April 2005	
51	Mina Laličić	Idol (Serbia & Montenegro) 2	7 May 2005	
52	Myriam Abdelhamid	Nouvelle Star 3	12 May 2005	
53	Jorun Stiansen	Idol (Norway) 3	20 May 2005	
54	Carrie Underwood	American Idol 4	25 May 2005	
55	Vlastimil Horváth	Česko hledá SuperStar 2	12 June 2005	
56	Maciej Silski	Idol (Poland) 4	19 June 2005	
57	Mike Mohede	Indonesian Idol 2	13 August 2005	
58	Melissa O'Neil	Canadian Idol 3	14 September 2005	
59	Daniel Lee	Malaysian Idol 2	24 September 2005	
60	Rosita Vai	NZ Idol 2	17 October 2005	
61	Kate DeAraugo	Australian Idol 3	21 November 2005	
62	Karin Kortje	Idols (South Africa) 3	27 November 2005	
63	Agnes Carlsson	Idol (Sweden) 2	2 December 2005	
64	Ilkka Jääskeläinen	Idols (Finland) 2	18 December 2005	
65	Ibrahim El Hakami	SuperStar (Arab world) 3	6 February 2006	
66	Raffaëla Paton	Idols (Netherlands) 3	11 March 2006	
67	Tobias Regner	Deutschland sucht den Superstar 3	19 March 2006	
68	Snorri Snorrason	Idol (Iceland) 3	7 April 2006	
69	Peter Cmorik	Slovensko hľadá SuperStar 2	8 April 2006	
70	Sandeep Acharya	Indian Idol 2	22 April 2006	
71	Nurzhan Kermenbayev	SuperStar KZ 3	6 May 2006	
72	Aleksander Denstad With	Idol (Norway) 4	19 May 2006	
73	Taylor Hicks	American Idol 5	24 May 2006	
74	Amarkhuu Borkhuu	Narodniy Artist 3	4 June 2006	
75	Christophe Durier	Nouvelle Star 4	8 June 2006	
76	Leandro Lopes	Ídolos (Brazil) 1	27 July 2006	
77	Susanna Petrosyan	Hay Superstar 1	30 July 2006	
78	Ihsan Tarore	Indonesian Idol 3	19 August 2006	
79	Dewald Louw	Idols (Afrikaans)	27 August 2006	
80	Eva Avila	Canadian Idol 4	17 September 2006	
81	Hady Mirza (Note: Hady also won Asian Idol, a competition between winners, on 16 December 2007.)	Singapore Idol 2	25 September 2006	
82	Mayré Martínez	Latin American Idol 1	26 October 2006	
83	Matt Saunoa	NZ Idol 3	29 October 2006	
84	Damien Leith	Australian Idol 4	26 November 2006	
85	Markus Fagervall	Idol (Sweden) 3	1 December 2006	
86	Mau Marcelo	Philippine Idol	10 December 2006	
87	Zbyněk Drda	Česko hledá SuperStar 3	17 December 2006	
88	Tinatin Chulukhadze	Geostar 1	31 December 2006	
89	Ari Koivunen	Idols (Finland) 3	6 April 2007	
90	Lusine Aghabekyan	Hay Superstar 2	8 April 2007	
91	Mark Medlock	Deutschland sucht den Superstar 4	5 May 2007	
92	Jordin Sparks	American Idol 6	23 May 2007	
93	Dean Delannoit	Idool 3	25 May 2007	
94	Timi Dakolo	Idols (West Africa)	26 May 2007	
95	Marwan Ali	SuperStar (Arab world) 4	4 June 2007	
96	Nevena Tsoneva	Music Idol 1	7 June 2007	
97	Birgit Õigemeel	Eesti otsib superstaari 1	10 June 2007	
98	Julien Doré	Nouvelle Star 5	13 June 2007	
99	Oleg Karezin	SuperStar KZ 4	30 June 2007	
100	Rini Wulandari	Indonesian Idol 4	28 July 2007	
101	Thaeme Mariôto	Ídolos (Brazil) 2	16 August 2007	
102	Brian Melo	Canadian Idol 5	11 September 2007	
103	Prashant Tamang	Indian Idol 3	23 September 2007	
104	Carlos Peña	Latin American Idol 2	28 September 2007	
105	Phương Vy	Vietnam Idol 1	3 October 2007	
106	Natalie Gauci	Australian Idol 5	25 November 2007	
107	Marie Picasso	Idol (Sweden) 4	7 December 2007	
108	Jody Williams	Idols (South Africa) 4	9 December 2007	
109	Vierka Berkyová	Slovensko hľadá SuperStar 3	16 December 2007	
110	Glenn Lyse	Idol (Norway) 5	21 December 2007	
111	Ani Kekua	Geostar 2	31 December 2007	
112	Nikki Kerkhof	Idols (Netherlands) 4	1 March 2008	
113	Lusi Harutyunyan	Hay Superstar 3	7 April 2008	
114	Thomas Godoj	Deutschland sucht den Superstar 5	17 May 2008	
115	David Cook	American Idol 7	21 May 2008	
116	Toma Zdravkov	Music Idol 2	2 June 2008	
117	Jana Kask	Eesti otsib superstaari 2	9 June 2008	
118	Amandine Bourgeois	Nouvelle Star 6	11 June 2008	
119	Elie Bitar	SuperStar (Arab world) 5	24 July 2008	
120	Eric Moyo	Idols (East Africa)	26 July 2008	
121	Aris	Indonesian Idol 5	2 August 2008	
122	Gretchen Espina	Pinoy Idol	17 August 2008	
123	Theo Tams	Canadian Idol 6	10 September 2008	
124	Margarita Henríquez	Latin American Idol 3	10 October 2008	
125	Wes Carr	Australian Idol 6	23 November 2008	
126	Kevin Borg	Idol (Sweden) 5	12 December 2008	
127	Koop Arponen	Idols (Finland) 4	14 December 2008	
128	Rafael Barreto	Ídolos (Brazil) 3	18 December 2008	
129	Giorgi Sukhitashvili	Geostar 3	31 December 2008	
130	Quốc Thiên	Vietnam Idol 2	14 January 2009	
131	Sourabhee Debbarma	Indian Idol 4	1 March 2009	
132 & 133 (Note: Sasha-Lee Davids was announced as the winner of season 5 of South Africa's Idols during the final on 3 May 2009. During the following week, it emerged that technical problems had led to an erroneous vote count. On 7 May, a recount established that Jason Hartman had received a greater share of votes than Davids. During a press conference the next day, the CEO of M-Net announced a decision to crown both Davids and Hartman as winners.)	Jason Hartman	Idols (South Africa) 5	8 May 2009	
132 & 133	Sasha-Lee Davids	Idols (South Africa) 5	8 May 2009	
134	Daniel Schuhmacher	Deutschland sucht den Superstar 6	10 May 2009	
135	Hrafna Hanna Elísa Herbertsdóttir	Idol (Iceland) 4	15 May 2009	
136	Kris Allen	American Idol 8	20 May 2009	
137	Magi Djanavarova	Music Idol 3	8 June 2009	
138	Soan	Nouvelle Star 7	9 June 2009	
139	Bojan Jambrošić	Hrvatska traži zvijezdu 1	19 June 2009	
140	Stan Walker	Australian Idol 7	22 November 2009	
141	Martha Heredia	Latin American Idol 4	10 December 2009	
142	Erik Grönwall	Idol (Sweden) 6	11 December 2009	
143	Saulo Roston	Ídolos (Brazil) 4	17 December 2009	
144	Ott Lepland	Eesti otsib superstaari 3	20 December 2009	
145	Martin Chodúr	Česko Slovenská SuperStar 1	20 December 2009	
146	Sezairi Sezali	Singapore Idol 3	27 December 2009	
147	Nodiko Tatishvili	Geostar 4	31 December 2009	

=== 2010s ===
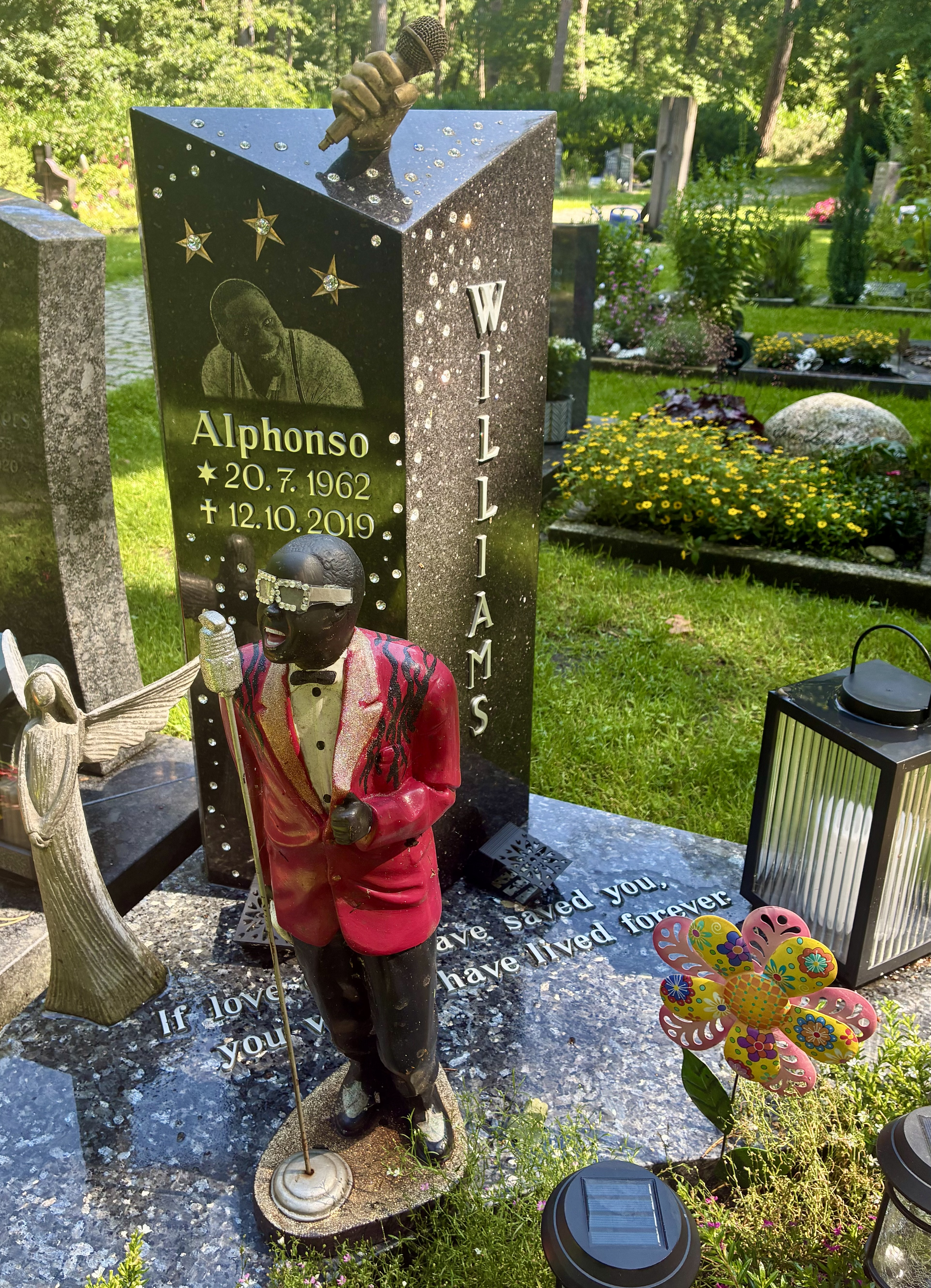
In 2017, Alphonso Williams won season 14 of Deutschland sucht den Superstar at the age of 54. He died of cancer two years later.

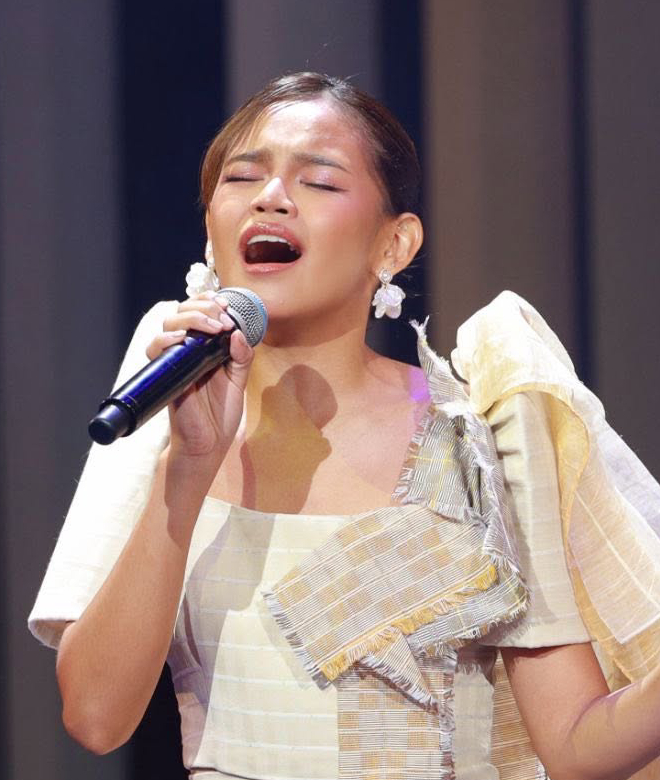
Zephanie Dimaranan, who won season 1 of Idol Philippines in 2019, has been referred to as "This Generation's Pop Princess" by Filipino media.

#	Winner	Season	Date	Reference
148	Filipe Pinto	Ídolos (Portugal) 3	14 February 2010	
149	Raffi Ohanian	Hay Superstar 4	14 March 2010	
150	Mehrzad Marashi	Deutschland sucht den Superstar 7	18 April 2010	
151	Lee DeWyze	American Idol 9	26 May 2010	
152	Kim Verson	Hrvatska traži zvijezdu 2	4 June 2010	
153	Luce	Nouvelle Star 8	16 June 2010	
154	Valando Tryfonos	Greek Idol 1	28 June 2010	
155	Igo Pentury	Indonesian Idol 6	7 August 2010	
156	Sreeram Chandra	Indian Idol 5	15 August 2010	
157	Israel Lucero	Ídolos (Brazil) 5	24 September 2010	
158	Elvis Blue	Idols (South Africa) 6	2 November 2010	
159	Jay Smith	Idol (Sweden) 7	10 December 2010	
160	Uyên Linh	Vietnam Idol 3	25 December 2010	
161	Oto Nemsadze	Geostar 5	31 December 2010	
162	Sandra Pereira	Ídolos (Portugal) 4	1 January 2011	
163	Yeka Onka	Nigerian Idol 1	27 March 2011	
164	Pietro Lombardi	Deutschland sucht den Superstar 8	8 May 2011	
165	Martti Saarinen	Idols (Finland) 5	8 May 2011	
166	Kevin Kayirangwa	Idool 4	20 May 2011	
167	Scotty McCreery	American Idol 10	25 May 2011	
168	Ivan Radenov	Macedonian Idol	30 May 2011	
169	Lukáš Adamec	Česko Slovenská SuperStar 2	5 June 2011	
170	Liis Lemsalu	Eesti otsib superstaari 4	12 June 2011	
171	Goran Kos	Hrvatska traži zvijezdu 3	17 June 2011	
172	Panagiotis Tsakalakos	Greek Idol 2	26 June 2011	
173	Henrique Lemes	Ídolos (Brazil) 6	15 July 2011	
174	Dave van Vuuren	Idols (South Africa) 7	4 October 2011	
175	Christian Pagán	Idol Puerto Rico 1	21 November 2011	
176	Amanda Fondell	Idol (Sweden) 8	9 December 2011	
177	Jenny Langlo	Idol (Norway) 6	16 December 2011	
178	Marita Rokhvadze	Geostar 6	31 December 2011	
179	Carmen Suleiman	Arab Idol 1	24 March 2012	
180	Mercy Chinwo	Nigerian Idol 2	7 April 2012	
181	Luca Hänni	Deutschland sucht den Superstar 9	28 April 2012	
182	Sona Rubenyan	Hay Superstar 5	29 April 2012	
183	Diandra Flores	Idols (Finland) 6	6 May 2012	
184	Phillip Phillips	American Idol 11	23 May 2012	
185	Marco Kappel	Deutschland sucht den Superstar Kids	25 May 2012	
186	Regina Ivanova	Indonesian Idol 7	7 July 2012	
187	Diogo Piçarra	Ídolos (Portugal) 5	29 July 2012	
188	Vipul Mehta	Indian Idol 6	1 September 2012	
189	Khaya Mthethwa	Idols (South Africa) 8	2 October 2012	
190	Edgard Hernández	Idol Kids Puerto Rico 1	11 November 2012	
191	Gremal Maldonado	Idol Puerto Rico 2	12 November 2012	
192	Fernando Franco	Ídolos Kids (Brazil) 1	12 December 2012	
193	Everton Silva	Ídolos (Brazil) 7	14 December 2012	
194	Rasmus Rändvee	Eesti otsib superstaari 5	23 December 2012	
195	Luka Zakariadze	Saqartvelos Varskvlavi 1	31 December 2012	
196	Ya Suy	Vietnam Idol 4	1 February 2013	
197	Sophie-Tith Charvet	Nouvelle Star 9	26 February 2013	
198	Moses Obi-Adigwe	Nigerian Idol 3	13 April 2013	
199	Siri Vølstad Jensen	Idol (Norway) 7	10 May 2013	
200	Beatrice Egli	Deutschland sucht den Superstar 10	11 May 2013	
201	Candice Glover	American Idol 12	16 May 2013	
202	Sabina Křováková	Česko Slovenská SuperStar 3	2 June 2013	
203	Mohammed Assaf	Arab Idol 2	22 June 2013	
204	Nina Sublatti	Saqartvelos Varskvlavi 2	1 July 2013	
205	Julia Tavares	Ídolos Kids (Brazil) 2	20 July 2013	
206	Li Xiangxiang	Chinese Idol 1	25 August 2013	
207	Anjana Padmanabhan	Indian Idol Junior 1	1 September 2013	
208	Christopher Rivera	Idol Kids Puerto Rico 2	10 November 2013	
209	Marileyda Hernández	Idol Puerto Rico 3	12 November 2013	
210	Musa Sukwene	Idols (South Africa) 9	26 November 2013	
211	Kevin Walker	Idol (Sweden) 9	6 December 2013	
212	Mong Uching Marma	Bangladeshi Idol	13 December 2013	
213	Mitra Kaislaranta	Idols (Finland) 7	19 December 2013	
214	Mathieu Saikaly	Nouvelle Star 10	20 February 2014	
215	Zamad Baig	Pakistan Idol 1	27 April 2014	
216	Aneta Sablik	Deutschland sucht den Superstar 11	3 May 2014	
217	Nhật Thủy	Vietnam Idol 5	11 May 2014	
218	Caleb Johnson	American Idol 13	21 May 2014	
219	Nowela	Indonesian Idol 8	23 May 2014	
220	Evelle	Nigerian Idol 4	7 June 2014	
221	Luis Ángel Racini	Idol Colombia	20 July 2014	
222	Vincent Bones	Idols (South Africa) 10	23 November 2014	
223	Mathilde Spurkeland	Idol Junior (Norway)	3 December 2014	
224	Lisa Ajax	Idol (Sweden) 10	5 December 2014	
225	Ingvar Olsen	Idol (Norway) 8	12 December 2014	
226	Hazem Sharif	Arab Idol 3	13 December 2014	
227	Zheng Xingqi	Chinese Idol 2	14 December 2014	
228	Johanes Tinambunan	Indonesian Idol Junior 1	28 February 2015	
229	Emji	Nouvelle Star 11	12 March 2015	
230	Nick Fradiani	American Idol 14	13 May 2015	
231	Severino Seeger	Deutschland sucht den Superstar 12	16 May 2015	
232	Jüri Pootsmann	Eesti otsib superstaari 6	31 May 2015	
233	K-Peace	Nigerian Idol 5	13 June 2015	
234	Trọng Hiếu	Vietnam Idol 6	2 August 2015	
235	João Couto	Ídolos (Portugal) 6	23 August 2015	
236	Ananya Sritam Nanda	Indian Idol Junior 2	6 September 2015	
237	Ny Ratana	Cambodian Idol 1	1 November 2015	
238	Karabo Mogane	Idols (South Africa) 11	22 November 2015	
239	Martin Almgren	Idol (Sweden) 11	4 December 2015	
240	Emma Drobná	Česko Slovenská SuperStar 4	6 December 2015	
241	Trent Harmon	American Idol 15	7 April 2016	
242	Saw Lah Htaw Wah	Myanmar Idol 1	8 April 2016	
243	Laisha Junaid	Maldivian Idol 1	2 May 2016	
244	Patrick Rouiller	Nouvelle Star 12	3 May 2016	
245	Prince Damien	Deutschland sucht den Superstar 13	7 May 2016	
246	Marius Samuelsen	Idol (Norway) 9	3 June 2016	
247	Nina den Hartog	Idols (Netherlands) 5	8 June 2016	
248	Hồ Văn Cường	Vietnam Idol Kids 1	17 July 2016	
249	Janice Phương	Vietnam Idol 7	30 September 2016	
250	Noma Khumalo	Idols (South Africa) 12	27 November 2016	
251	Liam Cacatian Thomassen	Idol (Sweden) 12	9 December 2016	
252	Chhin Manich	Cambodian Idol 2	25 December 2016	
253	Yacoub Shaheen	Arab Idol 4	25 February 2017	
254	Sharon Padidi	Indonesian Idol Junior 2	11 March 2017	
255	Thar Nge	Myanmar Idol 2	25 March 2017	
256	L.V. Revanth	Indian Idol 9	2 April 2017	
257	Julia van Helvoirt	Idols (Netherlands) 6	19 April 2017	
258	Alphonso Williams	Deutschland sucht den Superstar 14	6 May 2017	
259	Mohamed Thasneem	Maldivian Idol 2	13 May 2017	
260	Mariusz Dyba	Idol (Poland) 5	17 May 2017	
261	Jinda Kanjo	Kurd Idol	14 July 2017	
262	Thiên Khôi	Vietnam Idol Kids 2	11 August 2017	
263	Buddha Lama	Nepal Idol 1	22 September 2017	
264	Paxton Fielies	Idols (South Africa) 13	19 November 2017	
265	Anniina Timonen	Idols (Finland) 8	1 December 2017	
266	Chris Kläfford	Idol (Sweden) 13	8 December 2017	
267	Xavier Matheu	Nouvelle Star 13	20 December 2017	
268	Mananiko Tsenteradze	Chven Varskvlavebi Vart	29 December 2017	
269	Kry Thaipov	Cambodian Idol 3	8 April 2018	
270	Maria Simorangkir	Indonesian Idol 9	24 April 2018	
271	Marie Wegener	Deutschland sucht den Superstar 15	5 May 2018	
272	Aishath Azal Ali Zahir	Maldivian Idol 3	12 May 2018	
273	Maddie Poppe	American Idol 16	21 May 2018	
274	Uudo Sepp	Eesti otsib superstaari 7	3 June 2018	
275	Tereza Mašková	Česko Slovenská SuperStar 5	10 June 2018	
276	Phyo Myat Aung (Note: Phyo Myat Aung won the competition by default because the other remaining finalist, ChanMyae MgCho, was too ill to compete on the evening of the final.)	Myanmar Idol 3	11 August 2018	
277	Yanga Sobetwa	Idols (South Africa) 14	18 November 2018	
278	Patrik Blomberg	Idols (Finland) 9	30 November 2018	
279	Sebastian Walldén	Idol (Sweden) 14	7 December 2018	
280	Anneth Delliecia	Indonesian Idol Junior 3	14 December 2018	
281	Øystein Herkedal Hegvik	Idol (Norway) 10	15 December 2018	
282	Ravi Oad	Nepal Idol 2	21 December 2018	
283	Salman Ali	Indian Idol 10	23 December 2018	
161 (Note: Oto Nemsadze had become the 161st artist to win an Idol competition when he won the fifth season of Geostar in 2010. His winning of Saqartvelos Varskvlavi therefore did not increase the total number of winners.)	Oto Nemsadze	Saqartvelos Varskvlavi 3	3 March 2019	
284	Davin Herbrüggen	Deutschland sucht den Superstar 16	27 April 2019	
285	Laine Hardy	American Idol 17	19 May 2019	
286	Zephanie Dimaranan	Idol Philippines 1	28 July 2019	
287	Luyolo Yiba	Idols (South Africa) 15	17 November 2019	
288	Tusse Chiza	Idol (Sweden) 15	6 December 2019	
289	Esther Dawt Chin Sung	Myanmar Idol 4	28 December 2019	
290	Phoeun Sopheap	Cambodian Idol Junior 1	29 December 2019	
291	Tornike Kipiani	Saqartvelos Varskvlavi 4	31 December 2019	

=== 2020s ===
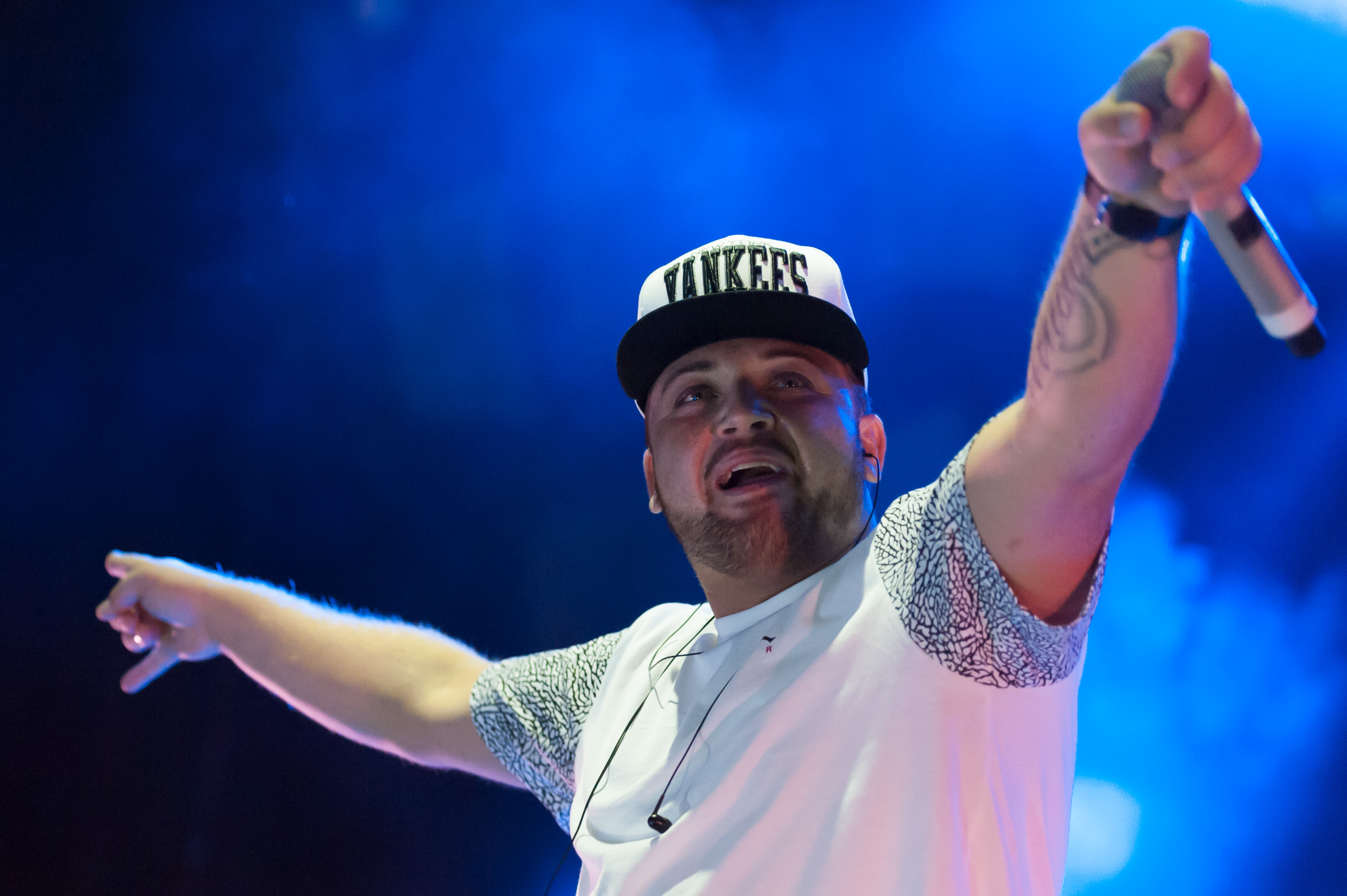
Menowin Fröhlich, pictured performing in a Deutschland sucht den Superstar tour in 2014, won the 22nd season of the competition in 2026, sixteen years after finishing second in season 7.

#	Winner	Season	Date	Reference
292	Sunny Hindustani	Indian Idol 11	23 February 2020	
293	Lyodra Ginting	Indonesian Idol 10	3 March 2020	
294	Ramon Roselly	Deutschland sucht den Superstar 17	4 April 2020	
295	Mari Eriksen Bølla	Idol (Norway) 11	15 May 2020	
296	Just Sam	American Idol 18	17 May 2020	
297	Barbora Piešová	Česko Slovenská SuperStar 6	31 May 2020	
298	Sajja Chaulagain	Nepal Idol 3	28 August 2020	
299	Nadja Holm	Idol (Sweden) 16	4 December 2020	
300	Índigo Salvador	Idol Kids (Spain) 1	4 December 2020	
301	Zama Khumalo	Idols (South Africa) 16	13 December 2020	
302	Jan-Marten Block	Deutschland sucht den Superstar 18	3 April 2021	
303	Ali Leo	Iraq Idol 1	9 April 2021	
304	Rimar Callista	Indonesian Idol 11	27 April 2021	
305	Chayce Beckham	American Idol 19	23 May 2021	
306	Kingdom Kroseide	Nigerian Idol 6	11 July 2021	
307	Pawandeep Rajan	Indian Idol 12	15 August 2021	
308	Berry Trytsman	Idols (South Africa) 17	21 November 2021	
309	Birkir Blær	Idol (Sweden) 17	10 December 2021	
310	Alika Milova	Eesti otsib superstaari 8	12 December 2021	
311	Alessandro Mucea	SuperStar România	17 December 2021	
312	Adam Pavlovčin	Česko Slovenská SuperStar 7	19 December 2021	
313	Bhupendra Thapa Magar	Nepal Idol 4	19 March 2022	
314	Afraa Sultan	Iraq Idol 2	26 March 2022	
315	Sagar Mhatre	Indian Idol Marathi	20 April 2022	
316	Harry Laffontien	Deutschland sucht den Superstar 19	7 May 2022	
317	Progress Chukwuyem	Nigerian Idol 7	22 May 2022	
318	Noah Thompson	American Idol 20	22 May 2022	
319	BVK Vagdevi	Telugu Indian Idol 1	17 June 2022	
320	Eduardo Gonçalves	Ídolos (Portugal) 7	3 July 2022	
321	Lim Tichmeng	Cambodian Idol 4	28 August 2022	
322	Carla Zaldívar	Idol Kids (Spain) 2	7 September 2022	
323	Khimo Gumatay	Idol Philippines 2	18 September 2022	
324	Thapelo Molomo	Idols (South Africa) 18	13 November 2022	
325	Nike Sellmar	Idol (Sweden) 18	25 November 2022	
326	Saga Matthildur Árnadóttir	Idol (Iceland) 5	10 February 2023	
327	Hams Fekri	Saudi Idol	15 March 2023	
328	Royston Sagigi-Baira	Australian Idol 8	26 March 2023	
329	Rishi Singh	Indian Idol 13	2 April 2023	
330	Sem Eisinger	Deutschland sucht den Superstar 20	15 April 2023	
331	Iam Tongi	American Idol 21	21 May 2023	
332	Salma Salsabil	Indonesian Idol 12	22 May 2023	
333	Soujanya Bhagavatula	Telugu Indian Idol 2	4 June 2023	
334	Victory Gbakara	Nigerian Idol 8	16 July 2023	
335	Sam Lida	Cambodian Idol Junior 2	5 August 2023	
336	Hà An Huy	Vietnam Idol 8	21 October 2023	
337	Thabo Ndlovu	Idols (South Africa) 19	4 November 2023	
338	Cimberly Wanyonyi	Idol (Sweden) 19	1 December 2023	
339	Ant Nurhan	Eesti otsib superstaari 9	3 December 2023	
340	Hana Ivković	SuperStar (Croatia) 1	9 December 2023	
341	Anna Fanney Kristinsdóttir	Idol (Iceland) 6	9 February 2024	
342	Vaibhav Gupta	Indian Idol 14	3 March 2024	
343	Dylan Wright	Australian Idol 9	25 March 2024	
344	Abi Carter	American Idol 22	19 May 2024	
345	Karan Pariyar	Nepal Idol 5	22 June 2024	
346	Chima Udoye	Nigerian Idol 9	14 July 2024	
347	Nazeeruddin Shaik	Telugu Indian Idol 3	21 September 2024	
348	Christian Jährig	Deutschland sucht den Superstar 21	10 November 2024	
349	Ki Savin	Cambodian Idol 5	10 November 2024	
350	Margaux Flavet	Idol (Sweden) 20	7 December 2024	
351	Karla Miklaužić	SuperStar (Croatia) 2	14 December 2024	
352	Manasi Ghosh	Indian Idol 15	6 April 2025	
353	Marshall Hamburger	Australian Idol 10	7 April 2025	
354	Jamal Roberts	American Idol 23	18 May 2025	
355	Shabrina Leanor	Indonesian Idol 13	20 May 2025	
356	Purp	Nigerian Idol 10	13 July 2025	
357	Ganga Sonam	Nepal Idol 6	31 August 2025	
358	Alexa Mendoza	Idol Kids Philippines	28 September 2025	
359	Areg Galstyan	Hay Superstar 6	4 October 2025	
360	Brinda	Telugu Indian Idol 4	1 November 2025	
361	Tuva Råwall	Idol (Sweden) 21	6 December 2025	
362	Kesha Oayda	Australian Idol 11	14 April 2026	
363	Menowin Fröhlich	Deutschland sucht den Superstar 22	9 May 2026	
364	Hannah Harper	American Idol 24	11 May 2026	
365	Celyna Grace	Indonesian Idol 14	25 May 2026	
366	Jyotirmayee Nayak	Indian Idol 16	26 July 2026	
367	Hira Qaisar	Pakistan Idol 2	23 August 2026	

==== Current seasons ====
As of November 2026, five seasons are currently airing, with winners expected to be crowned in the near future:

Season	Date of final
Idol (Sweden) 22	5 December 2026
Česko Slovenska SuperStar 8	9 December 2026
Superstar KZ 5	27 December 2026
Indian Idol 17	TBA
Tamil Idol 1	TBA
