= Idol stjörnuleit season 3 =

Idol stjörnuleit
- Season 3
- Hosted by: Jóhannes Ásbjörnsson; Sigmar Vilhjálmsson
- Judges: Bubbi Morthens; Sigríður Beinteinsdóttir; Páll Óskar; Einar Bárðarson
- Winner: Snorri Snorrason
- Runner-up: Ína Valgerður Pétursdóttir

Release
- Original network: Stöð 2
- Original release: 2005 – April 7, 2006

Season chronology
- ← Previous; Season 2 Next → Season 4

In the third season of Idol stjörnuleit, Snorri Snorrason won over Ína Valgerður Pétursdóttir.

== Finals ==
=== Finalists ===
(ages stated at time of contest)

Contestant	Age	Hometown	Voted Off	Liveshow Theme
Snorri Snorrason	28	Reykjavík	Winner	Grand Finale
Ína Valgerður Pétursdóttir	17	Húsavík	April 7, 2006	Grand Finale
Bríet Sunna Valdemarsdóttir	17	Vatnsleysuströnd	March 31, 2006	Hits of 2005
Ragnheiður Sara Grímsdóttir	24	Kópavogur	March 24, 2006	American Songs
Alexander Aron Guðbjartsson	26	Reykjavík	March 17, 2006	Icelandic Pop Songs
Ingólfur Þórarinsson	19	Reykjavík	March 10, 2006	Big Band
Guðrún Lára Alfreðsdóttir	23	Vesturbær	March 3, 2006	British Songs
Eiríkur Hafdal	21	Eskifjörður	February 24, 2006	Icelandic Songs
Elfa Björk Rúnarsdóttir	27	Reykjavík	February 17, 2006	Disco
Tinna Björk Guðjónsdóttir	16	Egilsstaðir	February 10, 2006	My Birth Year
Angela Ingibjörg Coppola	19	Reykjavík	February 3, 2006	Songs by Hippies
Margrét Guðrún Gunnarsdóttir	17	Kópavogur	January 27, 2006	My Idol

=== Live show details ===
==== Heat 1 (18 November 2005) ====
Artist	Song (original artists)	Result
Eiríkur Hafdal	"Bed of Roses" (Bon Jovi)	Advanced
Eyrún Eðvaldsdóttir	"If I Ain't Got You" (Alicia Keys)	Eliminated
Guðbjörg Pálsdóttir	"Ef ég ætti" (Sálin hans Jóns míns)	Eliminated
Guðríður Pétursdóttir	"Autumn Leaves" (Jo Stafford)	Eliminated
Ragnheiður Sara Grímsdóttir	"Ég elska þig enn" (Mannakorn)	Advanced
Sigurveig Stefánsdóttir	"River Deep – Mountain High" (Tina Turner)	Eliminated
Viktor Sigurjónsson	"Amazed" (Lonestar)	Eliminated

==== Heat 2 (25 November 2005) ====
Artist	Song (original artists)	Result
Agnes Drífa Pálsdóttir	"But I Do Love You" (LeAnn Rimes)	Eliminated
Björn Daði Björnsson	"Hey Jude" (The Beatles)	Eliminated
Bríet Sunna Valdemarsdóttir	"When I Think of Angels" (KK & Ellen Kristjánsdóttir)	Advanced
Elfa Björk Rúnarsdóttir	"Get Here" (Oleta Adams)	Eliminated
Eva Kristinsdóttir	"Er hann birtist" (Thor's Hammer)	Eliminated
Ingólfur Þórarinsson	"Wild World" (Cat Stevens)	Advanced
Sjöfn Gunnarsdóttir	"Don't Try to Fool Me" (Jóhann G. Jóhannsson)	Eliminated

==== Heat 3 (2 December 2005) ====
Artist	Song (original artists)	Result
Angela Ingibjörg Coppola	"Because of You" (Kelly Clarkson)	Advanced
Brynjar Örn Gunnarsson	"Álfheiður Björk" (Nýdönsk)	Eliminated
Daníel Óliver Sveinsson	"Ticket to Ride" (The Beatles)	Eliminated
Erla Stefánsdóttir	"True Colors" (Cyndi Lauper)	Eliminated
Harpa Soffía Einarsdóttir	"You're Still the One" (Shania Twain)	Eliminated
Inga Þyri Þórðardóttir	"Against All Odds (Take a Look at Me Now)" (Mariah Carey)	Eliminated
Tinna Björk Guðjónsdóttir	"Miss Celie's Blues" (Emilíana Torrini)	Advanced

==== Heat 4 (9 December 2005) ====
Artist	Song (original artists)	Result
Ágústa Ósk Óskarsdóttir	"Ég fann þig" (Björgvin Halldórsson)	Eliminated
Guðbjörg Elísa Hafsteinsdóttir	"" ()	Eliminated
Gunnar Már Jakobsson	"Þú átt mig ein" (Vilhjálmur Vilhjálmsson)	Eliminated
Ína Valgerður Pétursdóttir	"Listen to Your Heart" (Roxette)	Advanced
Margrét Guðrún Gunnarsdóttir	"Will You Love Me Tomorrow" (The Shirelles)	Advanced
Melkorka Edda Sigurgrímsdóttir	"I'm Outta Love" (Anastacia)	Eliminated
Sigfús Ólafur Guðmundsson	"Tætum og tryllum" (Stuðmenn)	Eliminated

==== Heat 5 (16 December 2005) ====
Artist	Song (original artists)	Result
Alexander Aron Guðbjartsson	"Let Her Cry" (Hootie & the Blowfish)	Advanced
Guðrún Lára Alfredsdóttir	"Riddari Götunar" (HLH Flokkurinn)	Eliminated
Hulda Dögg Proppé	"Hit the Road Jack" (Ray Charles)	Eliminated
Íris Hólm Jónsdóttir	"Hægt og hljótt" (Halla Margrét Árnadóttir)	Eliminated
Snorri Snorrason	"Can't Cry Hard Enough" (The Williams Brothers)	Advanced
Svava Anne Sveinsdóttir	"Ég veit þú kemur" (Elly Vilhjálms)	Eliminated
Telma Björg Kristinsdóttir	"Everytime" ()	Eliminated

==== Live Show 1 (27 January 2006) ====
Theme: My Idol

Artist	Song (original artists)	Result
Alexander Aron Guðbjartsson	"I Don't Want to Be" (Gavin DeGraw)	Safe
Angela Ingibjörg Coppola	"What You're Made of" (Lucie Silvas)	Bottom three
Bríet Sunna Valdemarsdóttir	"My Number One" (Elena Paparizou)	Safe
Eiríkur Hafdal	"Summer of '69" (Bryan Adams)	Bottom two
Elfa Björk Rúnarsdóttir	"One Day in Your Life" (Anastacia)	Safe
Guðrún Lára Alfreðsdóttir	"Crazy Love" (Emilíana Torrini)	Safe
Ingólfur Þórarinsson	"Drift Away" (Dobie Gray)	Safe
Ína Valgerður Pétursdóttir	"A Moment Like This" (Kelly Clarkson)	Safe
Margrét Guðrún Gunnarsdóttir	"Rescue Me" (Fontella Bass)	Eliminated
Ragnheiður Sara Grímsdóttir	"Try a Little Tenderness" (Otis Redding)	Safe
Snorri Snorrason	"Fuzzy" (Grant Lee Buffalo)	Safe
Tinna Björk Guðjónsdóttir	"Ain't No Mountain High Enough" (Marvin Gaye & Tammi Terrell)	Safe

==== Live Show 2 (3 February 2006) ====
Theme: Songs by Hippies

Artist	Song (original artists)	Result
Alexander Aron Guðbjartsson	"People Get Ready" (The Impressions)	Safe
Angela Ingibjörg Coppola	"Happy Together" (The Turtles)	Eliminated
Bríet Sunna Valdemarsdóttir	"My Sweet Lord" (George Harrison)	Safe
Eiríkur Hafdal	"A Whiter Shade of Pale" (Procol Harum)	Bottom two
Elfa Björk Rúnarsdóttir	"Heat Wave" (Martha and the Vandellas)	Safe
Guðrún Lára Alfreðsdóttir	"The Letter" (The Box Tops)	Safe
Ingólfur Þórarinsson	"Black Magic Woman" (Fleetwood Mac)	Safe
Ína Valgerður Pétursdóttir	"Move Over" (Janis Joplin)	Safe
Ragnheiður Sara Grímsdóttir	"Nights in White Satin" (The Moody Blues)	Safe
Snorri Snorrason	"The Weight" (The Band)	Safe
Tinna Björk Guðjónsdóttir	"Ruby Tuesday" (The Rolling Stones)	Bottom three

==== Live Show 3 (10 February 2006) ====
Theme: My Birth Year

Artist	Song (original artists)	Result
Alexander Aron Guðbjartsson	"Hold the Line" (Toto)	Safe
Bríet Sunna Valdemarsdóttir	"Where Do Broken Hearts Go" (Whitney Houston)	Bottom three
Eiríkur Hafdal	"Footloose" (Kenny Loggins)	Safe
Elfa Björk Rúnarsdóttir	"You Light Up My Life" (Whitney Houston)	Safe
Guðrún Lára Alfreðsdóttir	"Tainted Love" (Soft Cell)	Bottom two
Ingólfur Þórarinsson	"True Colors" (Phil Collins)	Safe
Ína Valgerður Pétursdóttir	"One Moment in Time" (Whitney Houston)	Safe
Ragnheiður Sara Grímsdóttir	"9 to 5" (Sheena Easton)	Safe
Snorri Snorrason	"Give a Little Bit" (Supertramp)	Safe
Tinna Björk Guðjónsdóttir	"Eternal Flame" (The Bangles)	Eliminated

==== Live Show 4 (17 February 2006) ====
Theme: Disco

Artist	Song (original artists)	Result
Alexander Aron Guðbjartsson	"Play That Funky Music" (Wild Cherry)	Safe
Bríet Sunna Valdemarsdóttir	"Hot Stuff" (Donna Summer)	Safe
Eiríkur Hafdal	"How Deep Is Your Love" (Bee Gees)	Safe
Elfa Björk Rúnarsdóttir	"Never Can Say Goodbye" (Gloria Gaynor)	Eliminated
Guðrún Lára Alfreðsdóttir	"Shake Your Body (Down to the Ground)" (The Jacksons)	Bottom three
Ingólfur Þórarinsson	"Super Freak" (Rick James)	Safe
Ína Valgerður Pétursdóttir	"I Will Survive" (Gloria Gaynor)	Safe
Ragnheiður Sara Grímsdóttir	"Ain't Nobody" (Chaka Khan)	Bottom three
Snorri Snorrason	"You to Me Are Everything" (The Real Thing)	Safe

==== Live Show 5 (24 February 2006) ====
Theme: Icelandic Songs

Artist	Song (original artists)	Result
Alexander Aron Guðbjartsson	"Ég veit þú kemur" (Elly Vilhjálms)	Bottom two
Bríet Sunna Valdemarsdóttir	"Lítill fugl" (Elly Vilhjálms)	Safe
Eiríkur Hafdal	"Þrek og tár" (Haukur Morthens)	Eliminated
Guðrún Lára Alfreðsdóttir	"Frostrósir" (Vilhjálmur Vilhjálmsson)	Safe
Ingólfur Þórarinsson	"Hæ mambó" (Haukur Morthens)	Safe
Ína Valgerður Pétursdóttir	"Heyr mína bæn" (Ellý Vilhjálms)	Safe
Ragnheiður Sara Grímsdóttir	"Litli tónlistarmaðurinn" (Björk)	Bottom three
Snorri Snorrason	"Dagný" (Sigfús Halldórsson)	Safe

==== Live Show 6 (3 March 2006) ====
Theme: British Songs

Artist	Song (original artists)	Result
Alexander Aron Guðbjartsson	"She's Not There" (The Zombies)	Safe
Bríet Sunna Valdemarsdóttir	"You're My World" (Cilla Black)	Bottom three
Guðrún Lára Alfreðsdóttir	"Downtown" (Petula Clark)	Eliminated
Ingólfur Þórarinsson	"You Really Got Me" (The Kinks)	Bottom two
Ína Valgerður Pétursdóttir	"You Don't Have to Say You Love Me" (Dusty Springfield)	Safe
Ragnheiður Sara Grímsdóttir	"Silence Is Golden" (The Tremeloes)	Safe
Snorri Snorrason	"Sunny Afternoon" (The Kinks)	Safe

==== Live Show 7 (10 March 2006) ====
Theme: Big Band

Artist	Song (original artists)	Result
Alexander Aron Guðbjartsson	"I've Got You Under My Skin" (Frank Sinatra)	Safe
Bríet Sunna Valdemarsdóttir	"Fever" (Peggy Lee)	Safe
Ingólfur Þórarinsson	"Sway" (Dean Martin)	Eliminated
Ína Valgerður Pétursdóttir	"Orange Colored Sky" (Natalie Cole)	Safe
Ragnheiður Sara Grímsdóttir	"Georgia on My Mind" (Ray Charles)	Bottom two
Snorri Snorrason	"Fly Me to the Moon" (Frank Sinatra)	Bottom three

==== Live Show 8 (17 March 2006) ====
Theme: Icelandic Pop Songs

Artist	Song (original artists)	Result
Alexander Aron Guðbjartsson	"Dag sem dimma nátt" (Í svörtum fötum)	Eliminated
Bríet Sunna Valdemarsdóttir	"Einhversstaðar einhverntímann... aftur" (Ellen Kristjánsdóttir)	Bottom two
Ína Valgerður Pétursdóttir	"Ferjumaðurinn" (Mannakorn)	Safe
Ragnheiður Sara Grímsdóttir	"Rain" (Jet Black Joe)	Bottom three
Snorri Snorrason	"Skýið" (Björgvin Halldórsson)	Safe

==== Live Show 9 (24 March 2006) ====
Theme: American Songs

Artist	First song (original artists)	Second song	Result
Bríet Sunna Valdemarsdóttir	"Always on My Mind" (Brenda Lee)	"Blue" (LeAnn Rimes)	Safe
Ína Valgerður Pétursdóttir	"I Wanna Dance with Somebody (Who Loves Me)" (Whitney Houston)	"Something to Talk About" (Bonnie Raitt)	Bottom two
Ragnheiður Sara Grímsdóttir	"Ben" (Michael Jackson)	"Jolene" (Dolly Parton)	Eliminated
Snorri Snorrason	"Sweet Child o' Mine" (Guns N' Roses)	"Annie's Song" (John Denver)	Safe

==== Live Show 10: Semi-final (31 March 2006) ====
Theme: Hits of 2005

Artist	First song (original artists)	Second song	Result
Bríet Sunna Valdemarsdóttir	"True" (Ryan Cabrera)	"You're Beautiful" (James Blunt)	Eliminated
Ína Valgerður Pétursdóttir	"Since U Been Gone" (Kelly Clarkson)	"Speed of Sound" (Coldplay)	Safe
Snorri Snorrason	"Wake Me Up When September Ends" (Green Day)	"You Raise Me Up" (Secret Garden)	Safe

==== Live final (7 April 2006) ====
Artist	First song	Second song	Third song	Result
Ína Valgerður Pétursdóttir	"Because You Loved Me"	"Piece of My Heart"	"Allt sem ég á"	Runner-up
Snorri Snorrason	"Feel"	"He Ain't Heavy, He's My Brother"	"Allt sem ég á"	Winner
