= Idol stjörnuleit season 1 =

Idol stjörnuleit
- Season 1
- Hosted by: Jóhannes Ásbjörnsson; Sigmar Vilhjálmsson
- Judges: Bubbi Morthens; Sigríður Beinteinsdóttir; Þorvaldur Bjarni Þorvaldsson
- Winner: Kalli Bjarni
- Runner-up: Jón Sigurðsson

Release
- Original network: Stöð 2
- Original release: 2003 – January 16, 2004

Season chronology
- Next → Season 2

Idol stjörnuleit (season 1) was the first season of Idol stjörnuleit, Iceland's version of the British reality series Pop Idol. Kalli Bjarni was the winner, with Jón Sigurðsson and Anna Katrín Guðbrandsdóttir as runners-up.

== Finals ==
=== Finalists ===
(ages stated at time of contest)

Contestant	Age	Hometown	Voted Off	Liveshow Theme
Kalli Bjarni	27	Grindavík	Winner	Grand Finale
Jón Sigurðsson	26	Reykjavík	January 16, 2004	Grand Finale
Anna Katrín Guðbrandsdóttir	17	Akureyri	January 16, 2004	Grand Finale
Ardís Ólöf Víkingsdóttir	21	Blönduós	January 9, 2004	Number 1 Hits
Tinna Marína Jónsdóttir	18	Reykjavík	January 2, 2004	Film Hits
Helgi Rafn Ingvarsson	18	Reykjavík	December 19, 2003	Stuðmenn Songs
Rannveig Káradottir	20	Garðabær	December 12, 2003	Disco Hits
Jóhanna Vala Höskuldsdóttir	18	Akureyri	December 5, 2003	Icelandic Songs
Sesselja Magnúsdóttir	26	Reykjavík	December 5, 2003	Icelandic Songs

=== Live show details ===
==== Heat 1 (24 October 2003) ====
Artist	Song (original artists)	Result
Anna Katrín Guðbrandsdóttir	"Yellow" (Coldplay)	Advanced
Erna Hrönn Ólafsdóttir	"Don't Let the Sun Go Down on Me" (Elton John)	Eliminated
Evan María Þórarinsdóttir	"Piece of My Heart" (Janis Joplin)	Eliminated
Guðfinna Hugrún Grundfjörð	"Stand By Me" (Ben E. King)	Eliminated
Guðrún Helga Jónsdóttir	"Heaven" (Bryan Adams)	Eliminated
Ingunn Þorkelsdóttir	"Foolish Games" (Jewel)	Eliminated
Kalli Bjarni	"(Sittin' On) The Dock of the Bay" (Otis Redding)	Advanced
Ólafur Már Svavarsson	"Smile" (Nat King Cole)	Eliminated

==== Heat 2 (31 October 2003) ====
Artist	Song (original artists)	Result
Bóas Kristjánsson	"Your Song" (Elton John)	Eliminated
Eva Natalja Róbertsdóttir	"(I've Had) The Time of My Life" (Bill Medley & Jennifer Warnes)	Eliminated
Jóhanna Vala Höskuldsdóttir	"Spáðu í mig" (Megas)	Advanced
Ragnar Már Magnússon	"Circle of Life" (Elton John)	Eliminated
Sæunn Kjartansdóttir	"All My Loving" (The Beatles)	Eliminated
Sesselja Magnúsdóttir	"Lately" (Stevie Wonder)	Advanced
Steinunn Þ. Camilla Sigurðardóttir	"On My Own" (Frances Ruffelle)	Eliminated
Svanlaug Erla Einarsdóttir	"(Everything I Do) I Do It for You" (Bryan Adams)	Eliminated

==== Heat 3 (7 November 2003) ====
Artist	Song (original artists)	Result
Alma Rut Kristjánsdóttir	"River Deep – Mountain High" (Tina Turner)	Eliminated
Ardís Ólöf Víkingsdóttir	"You're My World" (Cilla Black)	Advanced
Arndís Ósk Atladóttir	"(Everything I Do) I Do It for You" (Bryan Adams)	Eliminated
Einar Valur Sigurjónsson	"Amazed" (Lonestar)	Eliminated
Gunnhildur Júlíusdóttir	"Proud Mary" (Tina Turner)	Eliminated
Oddur Carl Thorarensen	"Don't Let the Sun Go Down on Me" (Elton John)	Eliminated
Rannveig Káradottir	"You Don't Know Me" (Eddy Arnold)	Advanced

==== Heat 4 (14 November 2003) ====
Artist	Song (original artists)	Result
Guðrið Hansen	"Dream a Little Dream of Me" (Mama Cass)	Eliminated
Helgi Rafn Ingvarsson	"Wonderful Tonight" (Eric Clapton)	Advanced
Hlynur Hallgrímsson	"This Night" (Billy Joel)	Eliminated
Jón Sigurðsson	"Honesty" (Billy Joel)	Eliminated
Thelma Hrönn Sigurdórsdóttir	"If Tomorrow Never Comes" (Ronan Keating)	Eliminated
Tinna Marína Jónsdóttir	"Next Plane Out" (Celine Dion)	Advanced
Tinna Ósk Grimarsdóttir	"The Second You Sleep" (Saybia)	Eliminated
Þórey Ploder Vigfúsdóttir	"Runaway" (The Corrs)	Eliminated

==== Live Show 1 (5 December 2003) ====
Theme: Icelandic Songs

Artist	Song (original artists)	Result
Anna Katrín Guðbrandsdóttir	"Ekkert breytir því" (Sálin hans Jóns míns)	Safe
Ardís Ólöf Víkingsdóttir	"Þú átt mig ein" (Vilhjálmur Vilhjálmsson)	Safe
Helgi Rafn Ingvarsson	"Síðan hittumst við aftur" (SSSól)	Safe
Jóhanna Vala Höskuldsdóttir	"Horfðu til himins" (Nýdönsk)	Eliminated
Jón Sigurðsson	"Flugvélar" (Nýdönsk)	Safe
Kalli Bjarni	"Reyndu aftur" (Mannakorn)	Safe
Rannveig Káradottir	"Ástarsæla" (Thor's Hammer)	Safe
Sesselja Magnúsdóttir	"Vetrarsól" (Björgvin Halldórsson)	Eliminated
Tinna Marína Jónsdóttir	"Presley" (Grafík)	Safe

==== Live Show 2 (12 December 2003) ====
Theme: Disco Hits

Artist	Song (original artists)	Result
Anna Katrín Guðbrandsdóttir	"Upside Down" (Diana Ross)	Safe
Ardís Ólöf Víkingsdóttir	"Blame It on the Boogie" (The Jacksons)	Safe
Helgi Rafn Ingvarsson	"Play That Funky Music" (Wild Cherry)	Safe
Jón Sigurðsson	"More Than a Woman" (Bee Gees)	Safe
Kalli Bjarni	"How Deep Is Your Love" (Bee Gees)	Safe
Rannveig Káradottir	"If I Can't Have You" (Yvonne Elliman)	Eliminated
Tinna Marína Jónsdóttir	"Lady Marmalade" (Christina Aguilera, Pink, Lil' Kim & Mýa)	Safe

==== Live Show 3 (19 December 2003) ====
Theme: Stuðmenn Songs

Artist	Song	Result
Anna Katrín Guðbrandsdóttir	"Ofboðslega frægur"	Safe
Ardís Ólöf Víkingsdóttir	"Strax í dag"	Safe
Helgi Rafn Ingvarsson	"Bíolagið"	Eliminated
Jón Sigurðsson	"Fljúgðu"	Safe
Kalli Bjarni	"Slá í gegn"	Safe
Tinna Marína Jónsdóttir	"Betri tíð"	Safe

==== Live Show 4 (2 January 2004) ====
Theme: Film Hits

Artist	Song (original artists)	Result
Anna Katrín Guðbrandsdóttir	"Can You Feel the Love Tonight" (Elton John)	Safe
Ardís Ólöf Víkingsdóttir	"Footloose" (Kenny Loggins)	Safe
Jón Sigurðsson	"The Sound of Silence" (Simon & Garfunkel)	Safe
Kalli Bjarni	"Greased Lightnin'" (John Travolta)	Safe
Tinna Marína Jónsdóttir	"Against All Odds (Take a Look at Me Now)" (Mariah Carey)	Eliminated

==== Live Show 5: Semi-final (9 January 2004) ====
Theme: Number 1 Hits

Artist	Song (original artists)	Result
Anna Katrín Guðbrandsdóttir	"Don't Speak" (No Doubt)	Safe
Ardís Ólöf Víkingsdóttir	"The Long and Winding Road" (The Beatles)	Eliminated
Jón Sigurðsson	"Sorry Seems to Be the Hardest Word" (Elton John)	Safe
Kalli Bjarni	"I Still Haven't Found What I'm Looking For" (U2)	Safe

==== Live final (16 January 2004) ====
Artist	First song	Second song	Result
Anna Katrín Guðbrandsdóttir	"Imagine"	"Lag Jóns og Stefáns"	Eliminated
Jón Sigurðsson	"Words"	"Lag Jóns og Stefáns"	Runner-up
Kalli Bjarni	"Mustang Sally"	"Lag Jóns og Stefáns"	Winner
