= Idol stjörnuleit season 2 =

Idol stjörnuleit
- Season 2
- Hosted by: Jóhannes Ásbjörnsson; Sigmar Vilhjálmsson
- Judges: Bubbi Morthens; Sigríður Beinteinsdóttir; Þorvaldur Bjarni Þorvaldsson
- Winner: Hildur Vala Einarsdóttir
- Runner-up: Aðalheiður Ólafsdóttir

Release
- Original network: Stöð 2
- Original release: 2004 – March 11, 2005

Season chronology
- ← Previous; Season 1 Next → Season 3

Idol stjörnuleit (season 2) was the second season of Idol stjörnuleit. Hildur Vala Einarsdóttir won over Aðalheiður Ólafsdóttir.

== Finals ==
=== Finalists ===
(ages stated at time of contest)

Contestant	Age	Hometown	Voted Off	Liveshow Theme
Hildur Vala Einarsdóttir	22	Reykjavík	Winner	Grand Finale
Aðalheiður Ólafsdóttir	23	Kópavogur	March 11, 2005	Grand Finale
Davïð Smári Harðarson	24	Selfoss	March 4, 2005	80s Hits
Lísebet Hauksdóttir	24	Ólafsfjörður	February 25, 2005	Songs from New York
Ylfa Lind Gylfadóttir	20	Hveragerði	February 18, 2005	Big Band
Helgi Þór Arason	18	Ísafjörður	February 11, 2005	Film Hits
Brynja Valdimarsdóttir	19	Akranes	February 4, 2005	Songs from Keflavïk
Margrét Lára Þórarinsdóttir	28	Egilsstaðir	January 28, 2005	Songs by Sálin
Valgerður Friðrikdóttir	23	Vestmannaeyjar	January 21, 2005	Disco
Nanna Kristín Jóhannsdóttir	28	Hafnarfjörður	January 14, 2005	My Idol

=== Live show details ===
==== Heat 1 (19 November 2004) ====
Artist	Song (original artists)	Result
Brynja Valdimarsdóttir	"I Only Want to Be with You" (Dusty Springfield)	Advanced
Davïð Smári Harðarson	"Where Everybody Knows Your Name" (Gary Portnoy)	Eliminated
Gísli Hvanndal Jakobsson	"Álfar" (Magnús Þór Sigmundsson)	Eliminated
Hildur Magnúsdóttir	"Love Will Keep Us Together" (Captain & Tennille)	Eliminated
Hólmfríður Norðfjörð	"I'm Not a Girl, Not Yet a Woman" (Britney Spears)	Eliminated
Lísebet Hauksdóttir	"Blame It on the Sun" (Stevie Wonder)	Eliminated
Svava Hrund Friðsiksdóttir	"My Heart Will Go On" (Celine Dion)	Eliminated
Valgerður Friðrikdóttir	"Lean on Me" (Bill Withers)	Advanced

Notes

- Brynja Valdimarsdóttir and Valgerður Friðrikdóttir advanced to the top 10 of the competition. The other 6 contestants were eliminated.
- Davïð Smári Harðarson and Lísebet Hauksdóttir returned for a second chance at the top 10 in the Wildcard Round.

==== Heat 2 (26 November 2004) ====
Artist	Song (original artists)	Result
Ása Margrét Birgisdóttir	"That's What Friends Are For" (Rod Stewart)	Eliminated
Jóhanna Ýr Jóhannsdóttir	"Weak" (Skunk Anansie)	Eliminated
Júlíus Bjargþór Daníelsson	"Easy" (Commodores)	Eliminated
Margrét Lára Þórarinsdóttir	"(You Make Me Feel Like) A Natural Woman" (Aretha Franklin)	Advanced
Nanna Kristín Jóhannsdóttir	"Help Me Make It Through the Night" (Gladys Knight & the Pips)	Advanced
Rakel Björk Haraldsdóttir	"Because the Night" (Patti Smith)	Eliminated
Róslaug Guðrún Agnarsdóttir	"Lean on Me" (Bill Withers)	Eliminated
Skúli Hakim Mechiat	"Daydream" (The Lovin' Spoonful)	Eliminated

Notes

- Margrét Lára Þórarinsdóttir and Nanna Kristín Jóhannsdóttir advanced to the top 10 of the competition. The other 6 contestants were eliminated.
- Júlíus Bjargþór Daníelsson and Rakel Björk Haraldsdóttir returned for a second chance at the top 10 in the Wildcard Round.

==== Heat 3 (3 December 2004) ====
Artist	Song (original artists)	Result
Allan Már Newman	"Black" (Pearl Jam)	Eliminated
Einar Már Björnsson	"Lean on Me" (Bill Withers)	Eliminated
Einir Guðlaugsson	"Hallelujah" (Leonard Cohen)	Eliminated
Eva Hlín Samúelsdóttir	"I Want to Spend My Lifetime Loving You" (Tina Arena & Marc Anthony)	Eliminated
Guðný Pála Rögnvaldsdóttir	"Líf" (Stefán Hilmarsson)	Eliminated
Guðrún Birna Ingimundardóttir	"Ain't No Sunshine" (Bill Withers)	Eliminated
Hildur Vala Einarsdóttir	"Immortality" (Celine Dion)	Advanced
Ylfa Lind Gylfadóttir	"Be-Bop-A-Lula" (Gene Vincent)	Advanced

Notes

- Ylfa Lind Gylfadóttir and Hildur Vala Einarsdóttir advanced to the top 10 of the competition. The other 6 contestants were eliminated.
- Einir Guðlaugsson, Eva Hlín Samúelsdóttir and Guðrún Birna Ingimundardóttir returned for a second chance at the top 10 in the Wildcard Round.

==== Heat 4 (10 December 2004) ====
Artist	Song (original artists)	Result
Aðalheiður Ólafsdóttir	"Dimmar rósir" (Tatarar)	Advanced
Elísabet Ólafsdóttir	"Lean on Me" (Bill Withers)	Eliminated
Ester Ágústa Guðmundsdóttir	"Don't Cry Out Loud" (Melissa Manchester)	Eliminated
Eva Natalja Róbertsdóttir	"Thank You" (Led Zeppelin)	Eliminated
Helgi Þór Arason	"American Pie" (Don McLean)	Advanced
Logi Júlíusson	"Ain't No Sunshine" (Bill Withers)	Eliminated
Sigurbjörg Tinna Gunnarsdóttir	"Ó borg, mín borg" (Haukur Morthens)	Eliminated
Svava Jónsdóttir	"You Don't Have to Say You Love Me" (Dusty Springfield)	Eliminated

Notes

- Aðalheiður Ólafsdóttir and Helgi Þór Arason advanced to the top 10 of the competition. The other 6 contestants were eliminated.
- Ester Ágústa Guðmundsdóttir returned for a second chance at the top 10 in the Wildcard Round.

==== Wildcard round (17 December 2004) ====
Artist	Song (original artists)	Result
Davïð Smári Harðarson	"Wicked Game" (Chris Isaak)	Advanced
Einir Guðlaugsson	"Plush" (Stone Temple Pilots)	Eliminated
Ester Ágústa Guðmundsdóttir	"Proud Mary" (Tina Turner)	Eliminated
Eva Hlín Samúelsdóttir	"Everlasting Love" (Carl Carlton)	Eliminated
Guðrún Birna Ingimundardóttir	"I Really Loved Harold" (Melanie)	Eliminated
Júlíus Bjargþór Daníelsson	"Traustur vinur" (Upplyfting)	Eliminated
Lísebet Hauksdóttir	"Have I Told You Lately" (Rod Stewart)	Advanced
Rakel Björk Haraldsdóttir	"Move Over" (Janis Joplin)	Eliminated

Notes

- Davïð Smári Harðarson and Lísebet Hauksdóttir received the highest number of votes, and completed the top 10.

==== Live Show 1 (14 January 2005) ====
Theme: My Idol

Artist	Song (original artists)	Result
Aðalheiður Ólafsdóttir	"Angel" (Aretha Franklin)	Safe
Brynja Valdimarsdóttir	"I Will Always Love You" (Whitney Houston)	Safe
Davïð Smári Harðarson	"Are You Gonna Go My Way" (Lenny Kravitz)	Safe
Helgi Þór Arason	"Eye of the Tiger" (Survivor)	Safe
Hildur Vala Einarsdóttir	"The Dark End of the Street" (James Carr)	Safe
Lísebet Hauksdóttir	"Í næturhúmi" (Margrét Eir)	Safe
Margrét Lára Þórarinsdóttir	"Þrá" (Í svörtum fötum)	Safe
Nanna Kristín Jóhannsdóttir	"Solitaire" (Neil Sedaka)	Eliminated
Valgerður Friðrikdóttir	"Man! I Feel Like a Woman!" (Shania Twain)	Bottom two
Ylfa Lind Gylfadóttir	"What's Up" (4 Non Blondes)	Bottom three

==== Live Show 2 (21 January 2005) ====
Theme: Disco Hits

Artist	Song (original artists)	Result
Aðalheiður Ólafsdóttir	"Hot Stuff" (Donna Summer)	Safe
Brynja Valdimarsdóttir	"I'm So Excited" (The Pointer Sisters)	Safe
Davïð Smári Harðarson	"Billie Jean" (Michael Jackson)	Safe
Helgi Þór Arason	"Instant Replay" (Dan Hartman)	Safe
Hildur Vala Einarsdóttir	"I Love the Nightlife" (Alicia Bridges)	Safe
Lísebet Hauksdóttir	"Young Hearts Run Free" (Candi Staton)	Safe
Margrét Lára Þórarinsdóttir	"Voulez-Vous" (ABBA)	Bottom three
Valgerður Friðrikdóttir	"Can't Take My Eyes Off You" (Frankie Valli)	Eliminated
Ylfa Lind Gylfadóttir	"Kung Fu Fighting" (Carl Douglas)	Bottom two

==== Live Show 3 (28 January 2005) ====
Theme: Songs by Sálin

Artist	Song	Result
Aðalheiður Ólafsdóttir	"Láttu mig vera"	Safe
Brynja Valdimarsdóttir	"Á tjá og tundri"	Safe
Davïð Smári Harðarson	"Original"	Bottom three
Helgi Þór Arason	"Sól, ég hef sögu að segja þér"	Safe
Hildur Vala Einarsdóttir	"Á nýjum stað"	Safe
Lísebet Hauksdóttir	"Flæði"	Bottom two
Margrét Lára Þórarinsdóttir	"Ekkert breytir því"	Eliminated
Ylfa Lind Gylfadóttir	"Sódóma"	Safe

==== Live Show 4 (4 February 2005) ====
Theme: Songs from Keflavïk

Artist	Song (original artists)	Result
Aðalheiður Ólafsdóttir	"Himinn og jörð" (Gunnar Þórðarson)	Bottom three
Brynja Valdimarsdóttir	"Don't Try to Fool Me" (Jóhann G. Jóhannsson)	Eliminated
Davïð Smári Harðarson	"Lítill drengur" (Vilhjálmur Vilhjálmsson)	Safe
Helgi Þór Arason	"Gaggó vest" (Gunnar Þórðarson)	Safe
Hildur Vala Einarsdóttir	"Er hann birtist" (Thor's Hammer)	Safe
Lísebet Hauksdóttir	"Í Reykjavíkurborg" (Þú og ég)	Safe
Ylfa Lind Gylfadóttir	"Ég gef þér allt mitt líf" (Jóhann Helgason)	Bottom two

==== Live Show 5 (11 February 2005) ====
Theme: Film Hits

Artist	Song (original artists)	Result
Aðalheiður Ólafsdóttir	"Fame" (Irene Cara)	Safe
Davïð Smári Harðarson	"Ain't No Sunshine" (Bill Withers)	Bottom three
Helgi Þór Arason	"Can't Fight the Moonlight" (LeAnn Rimes)	Eliminated
Hildur Vala Einarsdóttir	"(Everything I Do) I Do It for You" (Bryan Adams)	Safe
Lísebet Hauksdóttir	"Son of a Preacher Man" (Dusty Springfield)	Bottom two
Ylfa Lind Gylfadóttir	"When a Man Loves a Woman" (Percy Sledge)	Safe

==== Live Show 6 (18 February 2005) ====
Theme: Big Band

Artist	Song (original artists)	Result
Aðalheiður Ólafsdóttir	"L-O-V-E" (Nat King Cole)	Bottom two
Davïð Smári Harðarson	"Moondance" (Van Morrison)	Safe
Hildur Vala Einarsdóttir	"It's Only a Paper Moon" (Ella Fitzgerald)	Safe
Lísebet Hauksdóttir	"Almost Like Being in Love" (Frank Sinatra)	Safe
Ylfa Lind Gylfadóttir	"Mack the Knife" (Bobby Darin)	Eliminated

==== Live Show 7 (25 February 2005) ====
Theme: Songs from New York

Artist	First song (original artists)	Second song	Result
Aðalheiður Ólafsdóttir	"Stephanie Says" (The Velvet Underground)	"You Are the Sunshine of My Life"	Bottom two
Davïð Smári Harðarson	"Perfect Day" (Lou Reed)	"Signed, Sealed, Delivered I'm Yours"	Safe
Hildur Vala Einarsdóttir	"You've Got a Friend" (Carole King)	"I Wish"	Safe
Lísebet Hauksdóttir	"Will You Love Me Tomorrow" (The Shirelles)	"As"	Eliminated

==== Live Show 8: Semi-final (4 March 2005) ====
Theme: 80s Hits

Artist	First song (original artists)	Second song	Result
Aðalheiður Ólafsdóttir	"Livin' on a Prayer" (Bon Jovi)	"Total Eclipse of the Heart" (Bonnie Tyler)	Safe
Davïð Smári Harðarson	"Easy" (Commodores)	"Take On Me" (A-ha)	Eliminated
Hildur Vala Einarsdóttir	"Careless Whisper" (George Michael)	"Heart of Glass" (Blondie)	Safe

==== Live final (11 March 2005) ====
Artist	First song	Second song	Third song	Result
Aðalheiður Ólafsdóttir	"Ég veit þú kemur"	"Líf"	"Slappaðu af"	Runner-up
Hildur Vala Einarsdóttir	"Án þín"	"Líf"	"The Boy Who Giggled So Sweet"	Winner
