= Idol stjörnuleit season 4 =

Idol stjörnuleit
- Season 4
- Hosted by: Jóhannes Ásbjörnsson; Sigmar Vilhjálmsson
- Judges: Björn Jörundur Friðbjörnsson; Selma Björnsdóttir; Jón Ólafsson
- Winner: Hrafna Hanna Elísa Herbertsdóttir
- Runner-up: Anna Hlín Sekulic

Release
- Original network: Stöð 2
- Original release: 2009 – May 15, 2009

Season chronology
- ← Previous; Season 3

Idol stjörnuleit (season 4) was the fourth season of Idol stjörnuleit. Hrafna Hanna Elísa Herbertsdóttir won over Anna Hlín Sekulic.

== Contestants ==
- Hrafna Hanna Elísa Herbertsdóttir (winner, 15 May 2009)
- Anna Hlín Sekulic (runner-up, 15 May 2009)
- Guðrún Lísa Einarsdóttir (third, eliminated 8 May 2009)
- Matthías Arnar Þorgrímsson (fourth, eliminated 1 May 2009)
- Sylvía Rún Guðnýjardóttir (fifth, eliminated 24 April 2009)
- Árni Þór Ármannsson (sixth, eliminated 17 April 2009)
- Alexandra Elfa Björnsdóttir (seventh, eliminated 17 April 2009)
- Gylfi Þór Sigurðsson (eighth, eliminated 3 April 2009)
- Georg Alexander Valgeirsson (ninth, eliminated 27 March 2009)
- Ólöf Katrín Þórarinsdóttir (tenth, eliminated 20 March 2009)
- Stefán Þór Friðriksson (eleventh, eliminated 20 March 2009)
- Sigurður Magnús Þorbergsson (twelfth, withdrew 20 March 2009)

=== Live show details ===
==== Heat 1 - Top 10 Girls (6 March 2009) ====
Artist	Song (original artists)	Result
Alexandra Elfa Björnsdóttir	"Héðanífrá" (Ragnheiður Gröndal)	Eliminated
Anna Hlín Sekulic	"Í Reykjavíkurborg" (Þú og ég)	Advanced
Berglind Ósk Guðgeirsdóttir	"Ferjumaðurinn" (Mannakorn)	Eliminated
Díana Lind Monzon	"Horfðu til himins" (Nýdönsk)	Eliminated
Guðrún Lísa Einarsdóttir	"Allt sem ég sé" (Írafár)	Advanced
Hrafna Hanna Elísa Herbertsdóttir	"Fæ aldrei nóg af þér" (Todmobile)	Advanced
Marína Ósk Þórólfsdóttir	"Dans dans dans" (Johann G. Johannsson)	Eliminated
Ólöf Katrín Þórarinsdóttir	"Ástarsæla" (Thor's Hammer)	Advanced
Sylvía Rún Guðnýjardóttir	"Presley" (Grafík)	Advanced
Þora Björg Sigurðardóttir	"Með þér" (Ragnheiður Gröndal)	Eliminated

==== Heat 2 - Top 10 Boys (13 March 2009) ====
Artist	Song (original artists)	Result
Árni Þór Ármannsson	"Fyrsti kossinn" (Thor's Hammer)	Advanced
Bessi	"Gvendur á eyrinni" (Dátar)	Eliminated
Bjarni	"Glugginn" (Flowers)	Eliminated
Davið	"Dag sem dimma nátt" (Í svörtum fötum)	Eliminated
Georg Alexander Valgeirsson	"Sóknuður" (Vilhjálmur Vilhjálmsson)	Advanced
Gylfi Þór Sigurðsson	"Sirkus Geira Smart" (Á Móti Sól)	Advanced
Magnúz	"Hjálpaðu mér upp" (Nýdönsk)	Eliminated
Matthías Arnar Þorgrímsson	"Himnalagið" (Urmull)	Advanced
Sigurður Magnús Þorbergsson	"Von mín er sú" (Land og synir)	Advanced
Stefán Þór Friðriksson	"Ég veit þú kemur" (Elly Vilhjálms)	Eliminated

==== Live Show 1 (20 March 2009) ====
Theme:

Artist	Song (original artists)	Result
Sigurður Magnús Þorbergsson	N/A	Withdrew
Alexandra Elfa Björnsdóttir	"Love Is a Battlefield" (Pat Benatar)	Safe
Anna Hlín Sekulic	"Who's Lovin' You" (The Jackson 5)	Safe
Árni Þór Ármannsson	"Beautiful Day" (U2)	Bottom three
Georg Alexander Valgeirsson	"Ain't No Sunshine" (Bill Withers)	Safe
Guðrún Lísa Einarsdóttir	"River Deep – Mountain High" (Tina Turner)	Safe
Gylfi Þór Sigurðsson	"If Tomorrow Never Comes" (Ronan Keating)	Safe
Hrafna Hanna Elísa Herbertsdóttir	"Heartache Tonight" (Eagles)	Safe
Matthías Arnar Þorgrímsson	"I Don't Want to Miss a Thing" (Aerosmith)	Safe
Ólöf Katrín Þórarinsdóttir	"I Guess That's Why They Call It the Blues" (Elton John)	Eliminated
Stefán Þór Friðriksson	"Higher" (Creed)	Eliminated
Sylvía Rún Guðnýjardóttir	"Sweet Child o' Mine" (Guns N' Roses)	Safe

==== Live Show 2 (27 March 2009) ====
Theme:

Artist	Song (original artists)	Result
Alexandra Elfa Björnsdóttir	"Mercy" (Duffy)	Safe
Anna Hlín Sekulic	"I Kissed a Girl" (Katy Perry)	Bottom three
Árni Þór Ármannsson	"My Eyes" (Travis)	Safe
Georg Alexander Valgeirsson	"What Do I Do with My Heart" (Eagles)	Eliminated
Guðrún Lísa Einarsdóttir	"Hot n Cold" (Katy Perry)	Safe
Gylfi Þór Sigurðsson	"I'm Yours" (Jason Mraz)	Safe
Hrafna Hanna Elísa Herbertsdóttir	"Warwick Avenue" (Duffy)	Bottom two
Matthías Arnar Þorgrímsson	"Stop and Stare" (OneRepublic)	Safe
Sylvía Rún Guðnýjardóttir	"Hold On Be Strong" (Maria Haukaas Storeng)	Safe

==== Live Show 3 (3 April 2009) ====
Theme: Film Hits

Artist	Song (original artists)	Result
Alexandra Elfa Björnsdóttir	"Flashdance... What a Feeling" (Irene Cara)	Safe
Anna Hlín Sekulic	"Don't Stop Me Now" (Queen)	Safe
Árni Þór Ármannsson	"You Know My Name" (Chris Cornell)	Bottom three
Guðrún Lísa Einarsdóttir	"Mamma Mia" (ABBA)	Safe
Gylfi Þór Sigurðsson	"Try a Little Tenderness" (Otis Redding)	Eliminated
Hrafna Hanna Elísa Herbertsdóttir	"The Sound of Silence" (Simon & Garfunkel)	Safe
Matthías Arnar Þorgrímsson	"Kiss from a Rose" (Seal)	Safe
Sylvía Rún Guðnýjardóttir	"Over the Rainbow" (Judy Garland)	Bottom two

==== Live Show 4 (17 April 2009) ====
Theme: 70s Hits

Artist	Song (original artists)	Result
Alexandra Elfa Björnsdóttir	"All the Young Dudes" (Mott the Hoople)	Eliminated
Anna Hlín Sekulic	"Lay All Your Love on Me" (ABBA)	Bottom three
Árni Þór Ármannsson	"Don't Stop" (Fleetwood Mac)	Eliminated
Guðrún Lísa Einarsdóttir	"" ()	Safe
Hrafna Hanna Elísa Herbertsdóttir	"" ()	Safe
Matthías Arnar Þorgrímsson	"" ()	Safe
Sylvía Rún Guðnýjardóttir	"" ()	Safe

==== Live Show 5 (24 April 2009) ====
Theme: Songs by Björgvin Halldórsson

Artist	Song	Result
Anna Hlín Sekulic	"Ég skal syngja fyrir þig"	Safe
Guðrún Lísa Einarsdóttir	"Skýið"	Safe
Hrafna Hanna Elísa Herbertsdóttir	"Hvað vita þeir"	Bottom three
Matthías Arnar Þorgrímsson	"Ég lifi í draumi"	Bottom two
Sylvía Rún Guðnýjardóttir	"Dagar og nætur"	Eliminated

==== Live Show 6 (1 May 2009) ====
Theme: My Birth Year

Artist	First song (original artists)	Second song	Result
Anna Hlín Sekulic	"When Doves Cry" (Prince)	"Jump (For My Love)" (The Pointer Sisters)	Bottom two
Guðrún Lísa Einarsdóttir	"I Want to Know What Love Is" (Foreigner)	"Holding Out for a Hero" (Bonnie Tyler)	Safe
Hrafna Hanna Elísa Herbertsdóttir	"Livin' on a Prayer" (Bon Jovi)	"Didn't We Almost Have It All" (Whitney Houston)	Safe
Matthías Arnar Þorgrímsson	"Don't Dream It's Over" (Crowded House)	"Alone" (Heart)	Eliminated

==== Live Show 7: Semi-final (8 May 2009) ====
Theme: Songs from the Eurovision Song Contest

Artist	First song (original artists)	Second song	Result
Anna Hlín Sekulic	"Wild Dances" (Ruslana)	"All Out of Luck" (Selma Björnsdóttir)	Safe
Guðrún Lísa Einarsdóttir	"My Number One" (Elena Paparizou)	"Open Your Heart" (Birgitta Haukdal)	Eliminated
Hrafna Hanna Elísa Herbertsdóttir	"All Kinds of Everything" (Dana)	"Þér við hlið" (Regína Ósk)	Safe

==== Live final (15 May 2009) ====
Artist	First song	Second song	Third song	Result
Anna Hlín Sekulic	"Woman in Love"	"Ég fer alla leið"	"Hlustaðu á regnið"	Runner-up
Hrafna Hanna Elísa Herbertsdóttir	"Ticket to the Moon"	"Ég fer alla leið"	"Ég elska þig enn"	Winner
