= Arason =

Arason is a patronymic masculine Icelandic surname, literally meaning "daughter of Ari". Notable people with the surname include:

- Árni Gautur Arason (born 1975), Icelandic football goalkeeper
- Guðmundur Arason (1161–1237), influential 12th and 13th century Icelandic saintly bishop
- Helgi Þór Arason (born 1986), rose to popularity after competing in Idol Stjörnuleit 2, the Icelandic version of Pop Idol
- Jón Arason (1484–1550), Icelandic Roman Catholic bishop and poet
- Kristján Arason (born 1961), former member of Icelandic national handball team
