= Björn Jörundur Friðbjörnsson =

Icelandic actor and musician (born 1970)

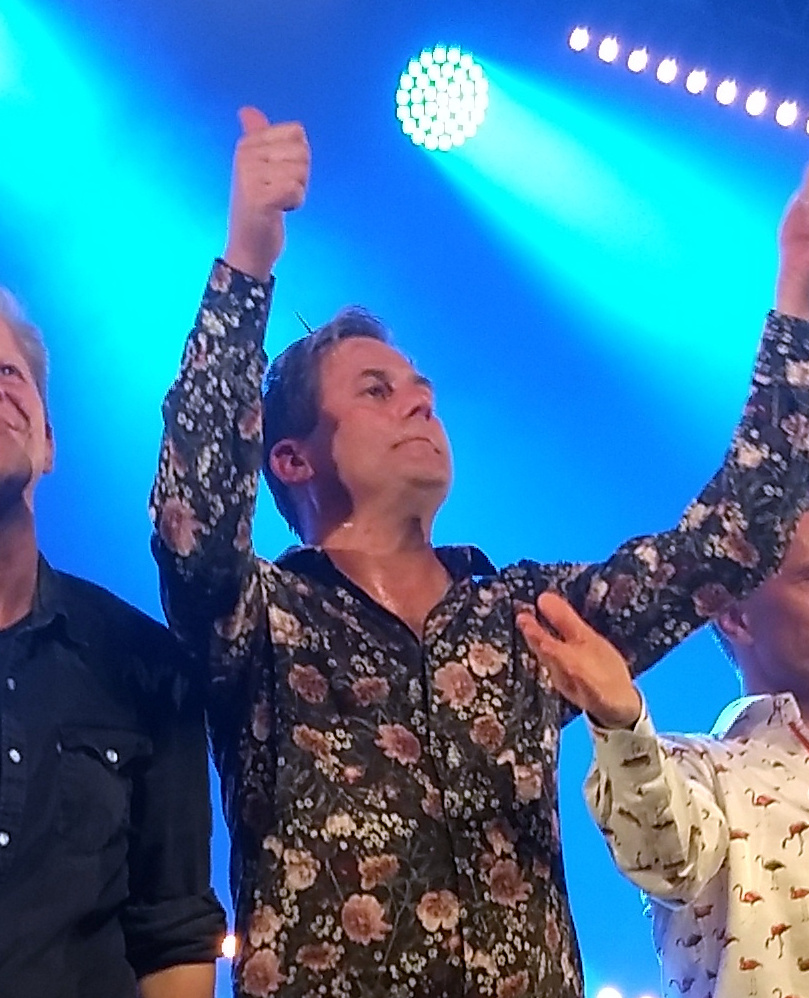
- Björn Jörundur in 2018

Background information
- Born: 11 October 1970 (age 54)
- Genres: Pop/rock
- Occupations: Singer; songwriter; actor
- Instrument(s): Vocals, bass
- Years active: 1987–present
- Member of: Nýdönsk

Björn Jörundur Friðbjörnsson (born 11 October 1970) is an Icelandic musician and actor. He is a founding member and singer of the band Nýdönsk. As an actor, Björn Jörundur is best known for his roles in Sódóma Reykjavík and Angels of the Universe.
