= Helgi Þór Arason =

Icelandic singer

Helgi Þór Arason (born December 12, 1986, in Reykjavík, Iceland), rose to popularity after competing in Idol Stjörnuleit 2, the Icelandic version of Pop Idol.

== Biography ==
Helgi Þór Arason is the son of Guðmundína Sturludóttir and Ari Már Pálsson. He was born in the capital, Reykjavík, but grew up in the Westfjordtown of Ísafjörður, a small northern fishing village in Iceland. At the age of 17, Helgi moved back to his birthplace of Reykjavík to participate in Idol Stjörnuleit.

After the competition he became the host of the popular dating game show Djúpa Laugin in 2005.

Later the same year, a new Icelandic pop group was founded by the name of "Heitar Lummur" where he was one of the four former Pop Idol singers forming the group.

== FM957 ==
In recent months, Helgi has been heard as a radio presenter at FM957, an Icelandic hit radio station mainly focusing on the younger audience group.

== Performances on Idol Stjörnuleit ==
- Semi Finals: "American Pie" by Don McLean
- Top 10: "Eye of the Tiger" by Survivor
- Top 9: "Instant Replay" by Dan Hartman
- Top 8: "Sól ég hef sögu að segja þér" by Sálin hans Jóns míns
- Top 7: "Gaggó Vest" by Gunnar Þórðarson (originally performed by Eiríkur Hauksson)
- Top 6: "Can't Fight the Moonlight" by LeAnn Rimes

== Discography ==
=== Compilations ===
- Heitar Lummur (Singing Multiple Icelandic Folk Songs)

=== Other recordings ===
- Vertu ekki að plata mig
- Hugsum Heim
- Ástin sigrar
