= Elly Vilhjálms =

Icelandic singer

Henný Eldey Vilhjálmsdóttir (28 December 1935 – 16 November 1995), known professionally as Elly Vilhjálms, was an Icelandic singer, regarded as one of the most popular female vocalists in Iceland in the 1960s and 1970s. She also performed with her brother Vilhjálmur Vilhjálmsson and with Ragnar Bjarnason.

== Biography ==
Vilhjálms was born in Merkines on the Reykjaness peninsula. She had four brothers, including musician Vilhjálmur Hólmar.

Elly started off her career in 1956 as a member of the band Orion, founded by her first husband Eyþór Þorláksson. It was the only Icelandic band to ever join a show of the United Service Organizations and to tour military bases, before disbanding in 1958.

In 1962, Elly recorded the song "Vegir liggja til allra átta" as part of the soundtrack of the film 79 af stöðinni (internationally released as The Girl Gogo), written by Indriði G. Þorsteinsson and directed by Erik Balling, achieving her breakthrough. Until the 1970s, she recorded numerous other hits – including "Sveitin milli sanda", "Ég vil fara upp í sveit", "Ég veit þú kemur", "Í grænum mó" and the English-language song "Almost like Being in Love" – as well as two solo LPs. Many of her successes were covers of foreign songs, as in the case of "Heyr mína bæn", a 1965 recording of "Non ho l'età", the Italian winning song for the Eurovision Song Contest 1964.

One of her performances featured in Grey's Anatomy in 2021.
