= Hildur Vala Einarsdóttir =

Icelandic singer

Hildur Vala Einarsdóttir (born 6 February 1982) is a singer who rose to popularity after winning Idol Stjörnuleit 2, the Icelandic version of Pop Idol. She was born in Reykjavík.

== Idol Stjörnuleit performances ==
Semi Finals: Immortality by Céline Dion & The Bee Gees
Top 10: Dark End Of The Street by Andrew Strong
Top 9: I Love The Nightlife by Alicia Bridges
Top 8: Á Nýjum Stað by Sálin hans Jóns míns
Top 7: Er Hann Birtist by Hljómar
Top 6: Everything I Do (I Do It For You) by Bryan Adams
Top 5: It's Only A Paper Moon by Bobby Darin
Top 4: You've Got A Friend by Carole King
Top 4: I Wish by Stevie Wonder
Top 3: Careless Whisper by George Michael
Top 3: Heart Of Glass by Blondie
Grand Final: Líf
Grand Final: Án Þín by Trúbrot
Grand Final: The Boy Who Giggled So Sweet by Emiliana Torrini

== Discography ==
Albums

- Hildur Vala (2005)
- Lalala (2006)
- Geimvísindi (2018)

Singles

- Líf
- The Boy Who Giggled So Sweet
- Gleðileg Jól (2005)

=== Compilations ===
- Svona Er Sumarið 2005 (Singing Songbird)
- Pottþétt 38 (Singing Í Fylgsnum Hjartans)
- Óskalögin 9 (Singing Lif)
- Uppáhalds Ljóðin Okkar (Singing Krókódíllinn Grætur)
