= Maldivian Idol season 3 =

Maldivian Idol
- Season 3
- Hosted by: Moosa Waseem, Shaina Shareef
- Judges: Ahmed Ibrahim; Unoosha; Ismail Affan; Zara Mujthaba

Release
- Original network: Television Maldives
- Original release: 15 February – 12 May 2018

The third season of Maldivian Idol premiered on 15 February 2018, on Television Maldives. Moosa Waseem continued as the show's host, while Unoosha, Ahmed Ibrahim and Ismail Affan returned as judges, joined by Zara Mujthaba who replaced Ibrahim Zaid Ali, while Shaina Shareef replaced Lamha Latheef as the show's female host.

== Auditions ==
Auditions took place in the following islands:

Date of airing	Island
15 February 2018; 16 February 2018	Malé City
17 February 2018	Addu City
18 February 2018	Ungoofaaru

== Contestants ==
Contestant	Age (on show)	Hometown	Status	Ref.
Aishath Azal Ali Zahir	18	S. Feydhoo	Winner	
Aminath Saina Mohamed Rasheed	16	S. Maradhoo		
Hassan Shahudhan	19	S. Hithadhoo		
Mariyam Maeesha	20	Malé City		
Naushad Abdul Latheef	21	Dh. Meedhoo		
Raihaan Adam	21	Dh. Meedhoo		
Thasleem Abdul Kareem	22	Malé City		
Abdulla Munaz	21	Hdh. Vaikaradhoo	Eliminated on 7 April 2018	
Ibrahim Shameel	20	K. Maafushi	Eliminated on 31 March 2018	
Abdulla Murushidh	25	Lh. Hinnavaru	Eliminated on 24 March 2018	
Mariyam Salwa	25	Malé City	Eliminated on 17 March 2018	
Shaan Shareef	19	R. Meedhoo	Eliminated on 17 March 2018	
Ahmed Nazih	16	S. Hithadhoo	Eliminated on 10 March 2018	
Moosa Ishan	22	Malé City	Eliminated on 10 March 2018	
Ahmed Isham	26	Malé City	Eliminated on 3 March 2018	
Nisfa Musthafa	17	HDh. Kumundhoo	Eliminated on 3 March 2018	

== Season overview ==
=== Top 16 – Piano Round ===
The Piano Round took place over two weeks, consisting of eight contestants per week. Mohamed Abdul Ghanee served as the contestants' mentor. Performance of the first eight contestants from Piano Round was aired on 2 March 2018 while elimination was held on 3 March 2018. Performance of the last eight contestants from Piano Round was aired on 9 March 2018 while elimination was proceeded on 10 March 2018.

Date of airing	Order	Contestant	Song	Result	Ref.
2 March 2018	1	Raihaan Adam	"Heelun Thi Foruvee Ladhun"	Safe	
2 March 2018	2	Shaan Shareef	"Nidhaalaa"	Safe	
2 March 2018	3	Mariyam Maeesha	"Joadehge Saafu Loabi"	Safe	
2 March 2018	4	Abdulla Munaz	"Inthizaaru Kuramey Loabivaathy"	Safe	
2 March 2018	5	Abdulla Murushidh	"Oagaavaashey Kalaa"	Bottom 3	
2 March 2018	6	Nisfa Musthafa	"Hairaan Vefai Veeme Baaky"	Eliminated	
2 March 2018	7	Ahmed Isham	"Nameh"	Eliminated	
2 March 2018	8	Aishath Azal Ali Zahir	"Ey Malaa Ishgee"	Safe	
9 March 2018	1	Hassan Shahudhan	"Vaarey Mirey"	Safe	
9 March 2018	2	Naushad Abdul Latheef	"Dhookoh Nudhey"	Safe	
9 March 2018	3	Moosa Ishan	"Roalhinjehey Vai"	Eliminated	
9 March 2018	4	Thasleem Abdul Kareem	"Kalaa Kalaa"	Safe	
9 March 2018	5	Ahmed Nazih	"Vaashey Mashaa Ekee"	Eliminated	
9 March 2018	6	Aminath Saina Mohamed Rasheed	"Beehila"	Safe	
9 March 2018	7	Mariyam Salwa	"Hitaa Roohun"	Bottom 3	
9 March 2018	8	Ibrahim Shameel	"Heyyambo"	Safe	

=== Top 12 – Evergreen Hits ===
The performances of the participants were aired on 16 March 2018, while the elimination night was held on 17 March 2018.

Order	Contestant	Song	Result	Ref.
1	Shaan Shareef	"Bunanhey Kalaa"	Eliminated	
2	Aishath Azal Ali Zahir	"Beeve Athun"	Safe	
3	Thasleem Abdul Kareem	"Jehilunve Mey Thelhey"	Safe	
4	Mariyam Salwa	"Saahibaa"	Eliminated	
5	Naushad Abdul Latheef	"Vaathee Hithaama"	Safe	
6	Abdulla Murushidh	"Loabi Loabi Hanshigandekey"	Bottom 3	
7	Ibrahim Shameel	"Kalakuvey"	Safe	
8	Aminath Saina Mohamed Rasheed	"Keiy Madhuvanee Ey"	Safe	
9	Abdulla Munaz	"Ey Malaa"	Safe	
10	Hassan Shahudhan	"Aa Feshun"	Safe	
11	Mariyam Maeesha	"Rey Rey Magey Hithah"	Safe	
12	Raihaan Adam	"Eki Rey Rey Dhin"	Safe	

=== Top 10 – Acoustic Night ===
The performances of the participants were aired on 23 March 2018, followed by the elimination on 24 March 2018.

Order	Contestant	Song	Result	Ref.
1	Aminath Saina Mohamed Rasheed	"Umurah Thiya Namugaa"	Safe	
2	Hassan Shahudhan	"Hama Himeynkan"	Bottom 3	
3	Raihaan Adam	"Neyngi Vevey Ihsaaseh"	Safe	
4	Mariyam Maeesha	"Thedhekey Thedhekey"	Safe	
5	Abdulla Murushidh	"Magey Laoibaa Magey Yaaru"	Eliminated	
6	Abdulla Munaz	"Gellifa"	Safe	
7	Naushad Abdul Latheef	"Ufaa Dhin Jaadhuvee Reyrey"	Safe	
8	Ibrahim Shameel	"Gasthugaa Kiyaadhemey"	Bottom 2	
9	Aishath Azal Ali Zahir	"Hooru Kan'baafulhu"	Safe	
10	Thasleem Abdul Kareem	"Udun Tharithah"	Safe	

=== Top 9 – Golden Artist ===
The performances of the participants were aired on 30 March 2018, followed by the elimination on 31 March 2018.

Order	Contestant	Song	Result	Ref.
1	Aishath Azal Ali Zahir	"Haalu"	Safe	
2	Thasleem Abdul Kareem	"Veynun Eyru Dhin"	Safe	
3	Naushad Abdul Latheef	"Gulhaalee Loabin"	Bottom 2	
4	Ibrahim Shameel	"Dhen Lalalaa"	Eliminated	
5	Mariyam Maeesha	"Mivaagothey"	Safe	
6	Raihaan Adam	"Kairin Govaalaahen"	Bottom 3	
7	Hassan Shahudhan	"Hulhevi Han'dhu"	Safe	
8	Abdulla Munaz	"Thi Handhaan"	Safe	
9	Aminath Saina Mohamed Rasheed	"Joashaa Maazy"	Safe	

=== Top 8 – Judges Choice ===
The performances of the participants were aired on 6 April 2018, followed by the elimination on 7 March 2018.

Order	Contestant	Song	Result	Ref.
1	Naushad Abdul Latheef	"Maamalun"	Safe	
2	Abdulla Munaz	"Maamui Han'dhuvaru"	Eliminated	
3	Hassan Shahudhan	"Asthaa"	Bottom 3	
4	Aishath Azal Ali Zahir	"Nunidhaathi"	Safe	
5	Raihaan Adam	"Beynumey Dheynuhey"	Bottom 2	
6	Aminath Saina Mohamed Rasheed	"Eki Rey Rey"	Safe	
7	Thasleem Abdul Kareem	"Ruhkuri"	Safe	
8	Mariyam Maeesha	"Kan'dumathi"	Safe	

== Guest performances ==
Week	Performer(s)	Title	Performance type
Top 12	Zara Mujthaba	"Dhohokkobeyge Banbukeyo Tree"	Live
Top 8	Ibrahim Zaid Ali	"Edhemey Kalaaya", "Mivaavaru Bunedhey"	Recorded
