= Kalli Bjarni =

Icelandic singer

Karl Bjarni Guðmundsson a.k.a. Kalli Bjarni (born 6 January 1976 in Reykjavík, Iceland) is an Icelandic singer who rose to popularity after winning Idol Stjörnuleit, the Icelandic version of Pop Idol.

== Arrest ==
On 1 June 2007, he was arrested at Keflavik International Airport when arriving from Frankfurt, Germany, and was found to have 2 kilos of cocaine on his person. He was sentenced to two weeks in custody while the authorities investigated whether the drugs were his or if he was carrying them for someone else. His career declined rapidly after the initial months of Idol-fame. Prior to his arrest, he had been working on a fishing boat.

== Discography ==
Albums

- Kalli Bjarni (2004)
