= Snorri Snorrason =

Icelandic singer (born 1977)

Snorri Snorrason (born 14 July 1977) is an Icelandic singer who rose to popularity after winning Idol Stjörnuleit 3, the Icelandic version of Pop Idol. Snorri, who was born in Reykjavík, compares his vocal style to Axl Rose & includes Robert Plant as his biggest influence, his favourite Icelandic artist is Jet Black Joe. Snorri was a contestant in the Icelandic selection to eurovision song contest but did not make it to the final.

== Idol Stjörnuleit 3 performances ==
Semi Finals: Can't Cry Hard Enough by The Williams Brothers
Top 12: Fuzzy by Grant Lee Buffalo
Top 11: The Weight by The Band
Top 10: Give A Little Bit by Supertramp
Top 9: You To Me Are Everything by The Real Thing
Top 8: Dagný by Sigfús Halldórsson
Top 7: "Sunny Afternoon" by The Kinks
Top 6: "Fly Me to the Moon" by Frank Sinatra
Top 5: Skýið by Björgvin Halldórsson
Top 4: Sweet Child O' Mine by Guns N' Roses
Top 4: Annie's Song by John Denver
Top 3: Wake Me Up When September Ends by Green Day
Top 3: You Raise Me Up by Westlife
Grand Final: Allt Sem Ég Á
Grand Final: Feel by Robbie Williams
Grand Final: He Ain't Heavy, He's My Brother by The Hollies

== Discography ==
=== Albums ===
- 2006: Allt Sem Ég Á

=== Singles ===
- 2006: "Allt Sem Ég Á"
- "Farin Burt"
- 2010: "Æskuást"
