= Sálin hans Jóns míns (band) =

Icelandic rock band

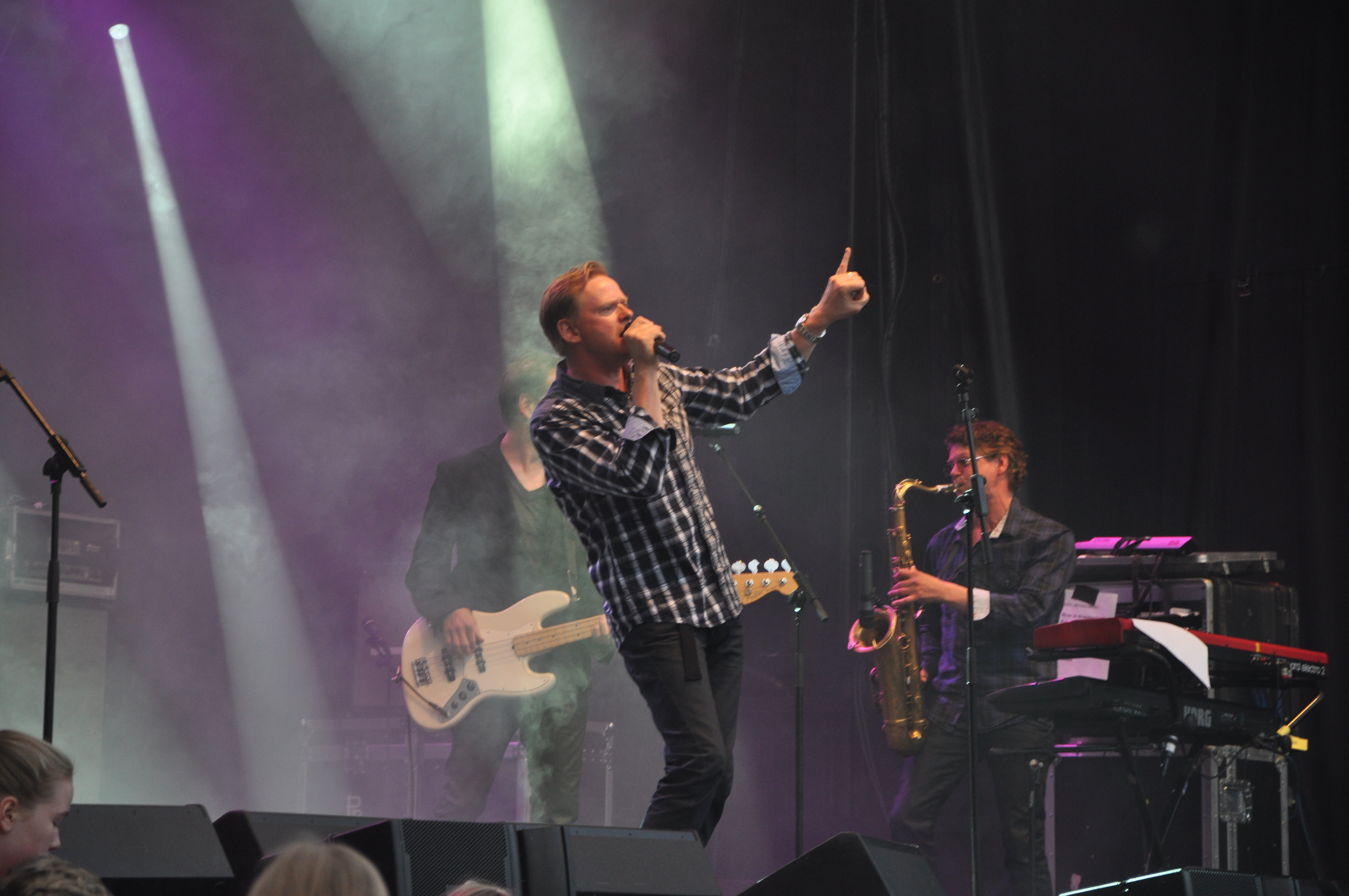
- Stefán Hilmarsson, lead singer of Sálin hans Jóns míns in 2012

Background information
- Also known as: Sálin
- Origin: Reykjavík, Iceland
- Genres: Rock
- Years active: 1988–2018
- Past members: Stefán Hilmarsson; Guðmundur Jónsson; Friðrik Sturluson; Jens Hansson; Jóhann Hjörleifsson; Rafn Jónsson; Harald Þorsteinsson

Sálin hans Jóns míns, sometimes abbreviated to Sálin, was an Icelandic rock band established in Reykjavík by Guðmundur Jónsson, Jón Ólafsson and Stefán Hilmarsson, with Rafn Jónsson and Harald Þorsteinsson joining for their inaugural year. The band held its first concert in March 1988, considered the year of establishment. In 1989, Rafn Jónsson and Harald Þorsteinsson were replaced by Friðrik Sturluson and Jens Hansson as permanent members.

The name is based on an Icelandic legend of the same name, Sálin hans Jóns míns, written by Icelandic poet Davíð Stefánsson.

== Members ==
- Stefán Hilmarsson - vocals
- Guðmundur Jónsson - guitar
- Friðrik Sturluson - bass
- Jens Hansson - Keyboards, saxophone
- Jóhann Hjörleifsson - drums

== Discography ==
=== Albums ===
- 1988: Syngjandi sveittir
- 1989: Hvar er draumurinn?
- 1991: Sálin hans Jóns míns
- 1992: Garg
- 1992: Þessi þungu högg
- 1995: Sól um nótt
- 1998: Gullna hliðið
- 1999: 12. ágúst '99
- 2000: Annar máni
- 2001: Logandi ljós
- 2003: Vatnið
- 2005: Undir þínum áhrifum
- 2006: Sálin og Gospel
- 2008: Arg
- 2010: Upp og niður stigann
- 2013: Glamr

solo by Stefán Hilmarsson

- 1993: Lif
- 1996: Eins og er...
- 2008: Ein handa þér
- 2009: Húm (Söngvar um ástina og lífið)

== Singles ==
(Selective)

- "Okkar nótt"
- "Á Nýjum Stað"
- "Sól ég hef sögu að segja þér"
- "Gefðu mér bros (Þú um það ;-)" (2013)
- "Ferðamenn" (2013)
