= Jóhannes Ásbjörnsson =

Icelandic TV and radio host (born 1979)

Jóhannes Ásbjörnsson (born 28 November 1979), nicknamed Jói but better known as C Joe, is an Icelandic TV and radio show host.

== TV career ==
Ásbjörnsson was born in Reykjavík. In 1999, he started a radio morning show with his collaborator of nine years, which became the most popular morning show in Iceland. In 2001, he started the TV show 70 minutes, which was modelled on their former radio show and ran for five consecutive years. Jóhannes and Simmi hired Sveppi and Auddi to the 70 minutes show, who have been on the air in Iceland since then.

In 2003 Jóhannes and Simmi D started hosting Idol Stjörnuleit on the Stöð 2 station, which ran for three consecutive years and became the most popular TV program in Icelandic TV history.

As of 2007, Jóhannes and Simmi host the morning program on Saturday mornings at Bylgjan 98.9, an Icelandic radio station.
