= Nýdönsk =

Icelandic musical group

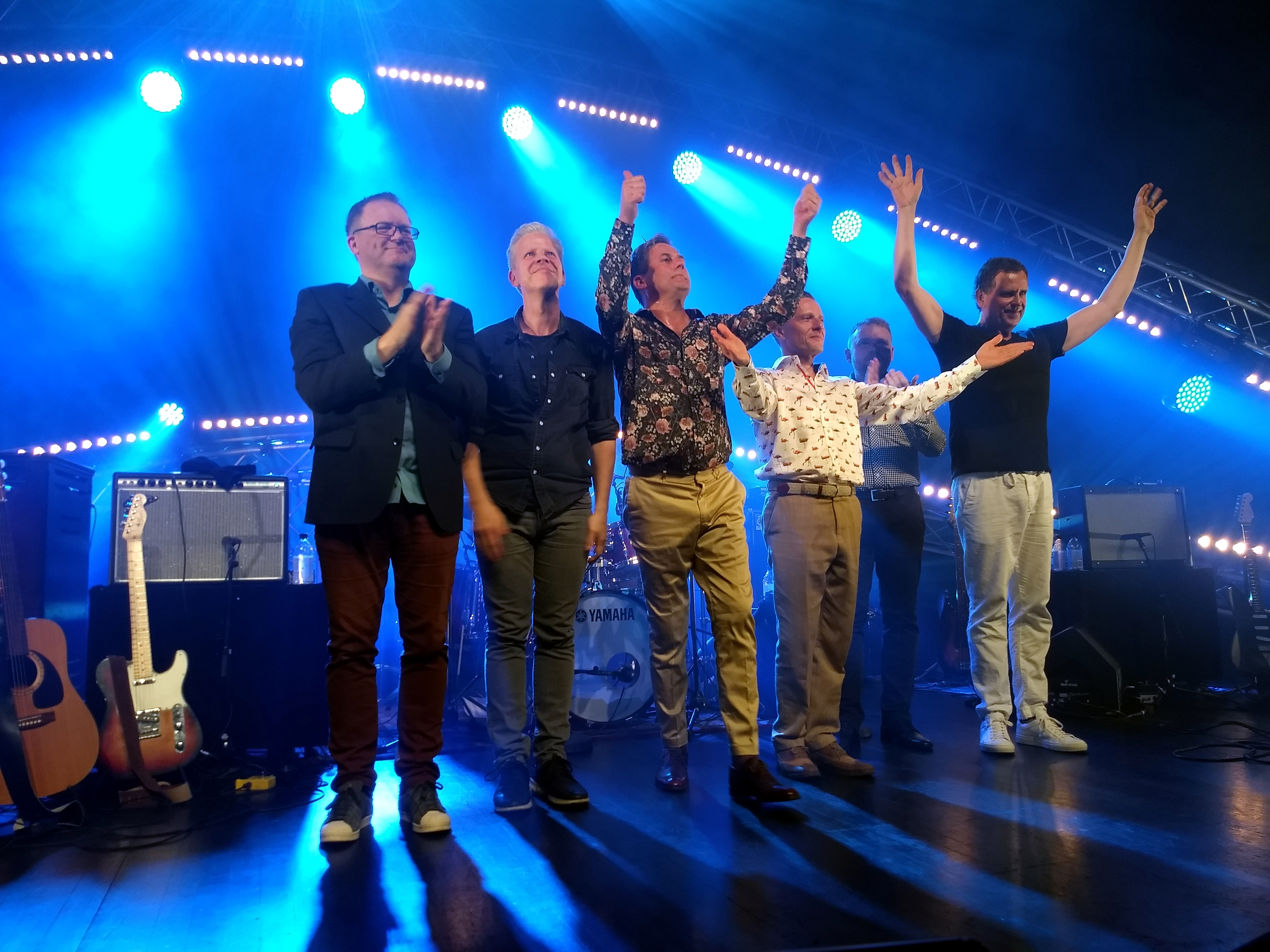
Nýdönsk after a concert in September 2018.

Nýdönsk (alternatively Ný dønsk or Ný dönsk, literally New Danish) is an Icelandic musical group established in 1987 by Daníel Ágúst Haraldsson, Björn Jörundur Friðbjörnsson, Ólafur Hólm Einarsson, Einar Sigurðsson and Valdimar Bragi Bragason with their debut album Ekki er á allt kosið released in 1989. The follow-up album Regnbogaland in 1990 signalled various changes in the line-up with some members departing and the inclusion of Jón Ólafsson and Stefán Hjörleifsson. The band has released a number of successful albums and compilations. After a hiatus, the band came back in 2007 on the 20th anniversary of the band's formation with an album Nýdönsk & Sinfó in 2008 with Sinfóníuhljómsveit Íslands, the Icelandic Symphonic Orchestra.

== Members ==
- Björn Jörundur Friðbjörnsson (1987–present)
- Ólafur Hólm Einarsson (1987–present)
- Einar Sigurðsson (1987-1990)
- Daníel Ágúst Haraldsson (1987-1997) (2007–present)
- Valdimar Bragi Bragason (1987-1989)
- Jón Ólafsson (1990–present)
- Stefán Hjörleifsson (1990–present)
- Bergur M. Bernburg (1987-1989)
- Þorgils Björgvinsson (1989-1990)

== Discography ==
=== Albums ===
- 1989: Ekki er á allt kosið
- 1990: Regnbogaland
- 1991: Kirsuber
- 1991: Deluxe
- 1992: Himnasending
- 1993: Hunang
- 1994: Gauragangur
- 1994: Drög að upprisu
- 1998: Húsmæðragarðurinn
- 2001: Pólfarir
- 2002: Freistingar
- 2004: Skynjun
- 2007: Grænmeti og ávextir
- 2008: Nýdönsk & Sinfó
- 2008: Turninn
- 2014: Diskó Berlín (Part 1)
- 2017: Á Plánetunni Jörð
- 2025: Í raunheimum

Compilation albums

- 1997: Nýdönsk 1987-1997
- 2007: Nýdönsk 1987-2007
- 2012: Nýdönsk 25

=== Singles ===
- 2008: "Náttúran"
- 2009: "Ég ætla að brosa"
- 2010: "Umboðsmenn drottins"
- 2010: "Vertu með"
- 2011: "Í nánd"
- 2013: "Where Dreams Go to Die"
- 2013: "Iður"
- 2014: "Uppvakningar"
- 2014: "Diskó Berlín"
- 2014: "Nýr maður"
- 2014: "Stafrófsröð"
- 2015: "Heimsins stærsta tár"
- 2017: "Stundum"
- 2020: "Örlagagarn"
- 2021: "Ég kýs"
- 2024: "Fullkomið farartæki"
- 2025: "Hálka lífsins"
