= Sálin hans Jóns míns =

Icelandic folklore legend

Sálin hans Jóns míns (literally The Soul of Jón) is an Icelandic folklore legend.
