= Vilhjálmur Vilhjálmsson (singer) =

Icelandic musician and singer

Vilhjálmur Vilhjálmsson

Vilhjálmur Hólmar Vilhjálmsson (11 April 1945 – 28 March 1978) often called Villi Vill was an Icelandic musician and singer. Vilhjálmur was the brother of the popular Icelandic singer Henný Eldey Vilhjálmsdóttir, better known by her stage name Elly Vilhjálms. Vilhjálmur was known for having a soft voice, perfectly suitable for the popular music at that time in Iceland.

== Early life ==
Vilhjálmur was born on 11 April 1945 to a musical family. His father and sister were both considered successful musicians. His father's name was Vilhjálmur Hinrik Ívarsson and his mother's name was Hólmfríður Magnúsdóttir. Vilhjálmur was born and raised in Merkines, close to the international airport, KEF, in Reykjanes, the peninsula south and west of Reykjavik. Vilhjálmur was the youngest of five siblings. He was often called by his middle name, Hólmar, during childhood. Vilhjálmur did not have much belief in his own musical talent and did not think his path lay in that direction.

== Early career ==
In 1961 Vilhjálmur went to school in Akureyri where he studied law but eventually changed his studies to medical studies. Because his sister Elly was a well-known and successful musician, Vilhjálmur was asked by some students to sing in a band. Although Vilhjálmur initially declined, he did eventually join. The group was known as Busabandið which translates to "The Freshmen Band". Vilhjálmur learned to play the double bass while playing with the band.

Vilhjálmur joined Ingimar Eydal's band in 1965, around the time he finished college. Vilhjálmur made two records with the band in October 1965 and February 1966. He also performed in their first concert in Reykjavík.

Several of Vilhjálmur's songs with Ingimar Eydal's band became hits. These include the songs Litla sæta ljúfan góða (approximately Little Cutie, Sweet and Kind), Raunsaga (True Story) and Vor í Vaglaskógi (Spring in Vaglaskógur). Vilhjálmur quit the band in 1965 because he wanted to continue his medical studies.

Vilhjálmur also worked with Magnús Ingimarsson and his band in 1964 to earn money for his family and to continue school. This band mostly played songs by foreign musicians and translated the texts from English to Icelandic. The band played every night of the week at a restaurant called Röðull. However, they also frequently played on a TV show hosted by Svavar Gests. This exposure really helped Vilhjálmur to get noticed.

== Later career and solo career ==
During the summer of 1970, Vilhjálmur was given the opportunity to record a two-song album for the SG Hljómplötur record label. This was Vilhjálmur's first solo album and the picture on the cover was taken on his wedding day. The songs on the album were "Árið 2012" (translation: The Year 2012) and "Hún hring minn ber" (translation: She bears my ring), which is the first Icelandic version of the Mexican song La Golondrina.

Vilhjálmur and his sister Elly recorded an album together in 1969. The record consisted of 12 songs and had the title "Systkinin Vilhjálmur og Elly Vilhjálms syngja saman" (translation: The siblings Vilhjálmur and Elly Vilhjálms sing together).

Vilhjálmur and Elly decided in consultation with Svavar Gests to make 2 more records as a follow-up to their first record together. They decided to start as quickly as possible because Vilhjálmur had intended to take a break from the music scene. The records were a tribute to two Icelandic musicians that had an anniversary coming up. The first record was made to honor Sigfús Halldórsson who had made many songs the Icelandic people knew by heart. The title of the record is "Vilhjálmur og Elly Vilhjálms syngja kunnustu lög Sigfúsar Halldórssonar" (translation: Vilhjálmur and Elly Vilhjálms sing the best known songs by Sigfús Halldórsson) and came out in early April 1970. The second record came out in September 1970 and honored Freymóður Jóhannsson, who was better known by his pseudonym The 12th of September. The record was given the name: Vilhjálmur og Elly – Lög Tólfta September (Vilhjálmur and Elly – The songs by 12 September). It received decent reviews although not as good reviews as their first record.

Vilhjálmur and Elly recorded their final record together in 1971 where they sang 12 Christmas songs picked by Svavar Gests. The record became a big success and was used as the soundtrack to the nation's Christmas preparations all around the country.

Vilhjálmur recorded 2 solo records; one in 1972 and another in 1973. The first record was called "Glugginn hennar Kötu" (Kate's Window). Glugginn hennar Kötu is a 12-song record and the songs were personally picked by Vilhjálmur. The second record was called "Fjórtán fyrstu login" (translation: The First 14 Songs). The record was a collection of old recordings by Vilhjálmur.

== Personal life and death ==
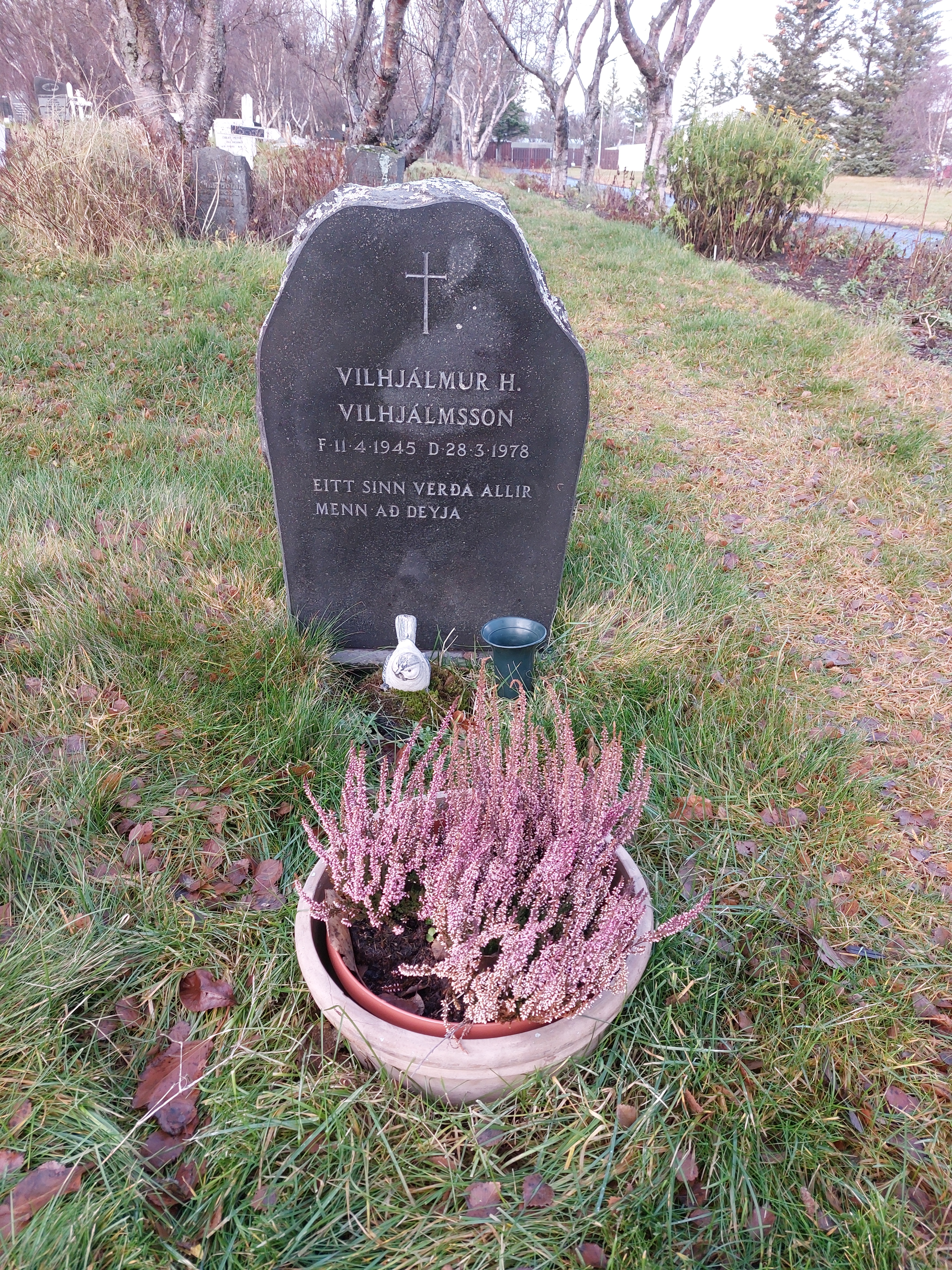
Vilhjálmurs grave in Fossvogur.

Vilhjálmur was married 3 times in his life and has two sons and one daughter. Besides being a musician, Vilhjálmur also had a pilot's license. Vilhjálmur died in a car crash in Luxembourg on 28 March 1978. He was 32 years old.

== Influence ==
Vilhjálmur is one of Iceland's most beloved musicians and his music is cherished by Icelanders, young and old. In 2008 a memorial concert was held in his honor where many of Iceland's most respected musicians performed.
