= Idol stjörnuleit =

- Created by: Simon Fuller
- Directed by: Þór Freysson
- Starring: Jóhannes Ásbjörnsson; Sigmar Vilhjálmsson
- Country of origin: Iceland
- No. of seasons: 4

Original release
- Network: Stöð 2
- Release: 2003 – 15 May 2009

Finalists (With dates of elimination)
Season 1	(2003–04)
Kalli Bjarni	Winner
Jón Sigurðsson	16 January
Anna Katrín Guðbrandsdóttir	16 January
Ardís Ólöf Víkingsdóttir	9 January
Tinna Marína Jónsdóttir	2 January
Helgi Rafn Ingvarsson	19 December
Rannveig Káradottir	12 December
Jóhanna Vala Höskuldsdóttir	5 December
Sesselja Magnúsdóttir	5 December
Season 2	(2004–05)
Hildur Vala Einarsdóttir	Winner
Aðalheiður Ólafsdóttir	11 March
Davïð Smári Harðarson	4 March
Lísebet Hauksdóttir	25 February
Ylfa Lind Gylfadóttir	18 February
Helgi Þór Arason	11 February
Brynja Valdimarsdóttir	4 February
Margrét L Friðrikdóttir	28 January
Valgerðurlheiður Ólafsdóttir	21 January
Nanna Kristín Jóhannsdóttir	14 January
Season 3	(2005–06)
Snorri Snorrason	Winner
Ína Valgerður Pétursdóttir	7 April
Bríet Sunna Valdemarsdóttir	31 March
Ragnheiður Sara Grímsdóttir	24 March
Alexander Aron Guðbjartsson	17 March
Ingólfur Þórarinsson	10 March
Guðrún Lára Alfreðsdóttir	3 March
Eiríkur Hafdal	24 February
Elfa Björk Rúnarsdóttir	17 February
Tinna Björk Guðjónsdóttir	10 February
Angela Ingibjörg Coppola	3 February
Margrét Guðrún Gunnarsdóttir	27 January
Season 4	(2009)
Hrafna Hanna Elísa Herbertsdóttir	Winner
Anna Hlín Sekulic	15 May
Guðrún Lísa Einarsdóttir	8 May
Matthías Arnar Þorgrímsson	1 May
Sylvía Rún Guðnýjardóttir	24 April
Árni Þór Ármannsson	17 April
Alexandra Elfa Björnsdóttir	17 April
Gylfi Þór Sigurðsson	3 April
Georg Alexander Valgeirsson	27 March
Ólöf Katrín Þórarinsdóttir	20 March
Stefán Þór Friðriksson	20 March
Sigurður Magnús Þorbergsson	withdrew

Idol stjörnuleit (English: Idol Starsearch) is Iceland's version of the British reality series Pop Idol. The show allows the people of Iceland—through telephone voting—to select the winner of several televised singing contests, following the same format as Pop Idol. Iceland is the smallest country (by population) to have its own Idol show.

The show airs on Stöð 2, four seasons have aired. Winners were Kalli Bjarni, Hildur Vala, Snorri Snorrason and Hrafna Hanna Elísa Herbertsdóttir. It is hosted by Jói and Simmi.

== Judges ==
The judges of Idol - Stjörnuleit seasons 1 and 2 were:

- Bubbi Morthens, musician and legend
- Sigríður Beinteinsdóttir, singer and musician
- Þorvaldur Bjarni Þorvaldsson, No. 1 music producer in Iceland and guitarist for rock band Todmobile

For season 3, Þorvaldur decided to leave and was replaced by 2 new judges making a total of four.

- Páll Óskar, musician and singer
- Einar Bárðarson, entrepreneur, artist manager and songwriter

After more than three years absence from Icelandic Television, Idol stjörnuleit returned for its fourth season in early 2009 with Jói and Simmi returning as hosts but with a complete new panel of judges consisting of:

- Björn Jörundur Friðbjörnsson, musician and actor
- Selma Björnsdóttir, musician/singer and dancer, two times representative of Iceland in the Eurovision Song Contest
- Jón Ólafsson, musician

== Season one ==
The inaugural season of Idol stjörnuleit aired in 2003–2004.

=== Semi Final Qualifications ===
Top 32
Format: 2 out of 8 making the final each week + one Wildcard

Date	First	Second
24 October	Kalli	Anna Katrín
31 October	Jóhanna Vala	Sesselja
7 November	Rannveig	Ardís Ólöf
9 November	Helgi Rafn	Tinna Marína
Wildcard (no Show)	Jón (Judges' Choice)

== Season two ==
The second season of Idol stjörnuleit aired in 2004–2005.

=== Semi Final Qualifications ===
Top 32
Format: 2 out of 8 making the final each week + 2 Wildcards

Date	First	Second
19 November	Brynja	Vala Friðriks
26 November	Margrét Lára	Nanna Kristín
3 December	Ylfa Lind	Hildur Vala
10 December	Aðalheiður	Helgi Þór
17 December (Wildcard)	Davïð Smári (Viewers choice)	Lísebet (Viewers choice)

=== Finals Elimination Chart ===
Date	Bottom Three
14 January	Nanna Kristín	Vala Friðriks	Ylfa Lind
21 January	Vala Friðriks (2)	Ylfa Lind (2)	Margrét Lára
28 January	Margrét Lára (2)	Lísebet	Davïð Smári
4 February	Brynja	Ylfa Lind (3)	Aðalheiður
11 February	Helgi Þór	Lísebet (2)	Davïð Smári (3)
Date	Bottom Two
18 February	Ylfa Lind (4)	Aðalheiður (2)
25 February	Lísebet (2)	Aðalheiður (3)
4 March	Davïð Smári (3)
11 March	Aðalheiður (4)	Hildur Vala

== Season three ==
The third season of Idol stjörnuleit aired in 2005–2006.

Stage:		Semi Finals							Finals										
Weeks:		#1	#2	#3	#4	#5	WC#1	WC#2	01/27	02/03	02/10	02/17	02/24	03/03	03/10	03/17	03/24	03/31	04/07
Place	Contestant	Result																	
1	Snorri					1									Btm3				Winner
2	Ína Valgerður				2												Btm2	Btm2	Runner-up
3	Bríet Sunna		1								Btm3			Btm3		Btm2		Elim	
4	Ragnheiður Sara	1										Btm3	Btm3		Btm2	Btm3	Elim		
5	Alexander Aron					2							Btm2			Elim			
6	Ingólfur		2											Btm2	Elim				
7	Guðrún Lára					Elim	WC				Btm2	Btm3		Elim					
8	Eiríkur	2							Btm2	Btm2			Elim						
9	Elfa Björk		Elim					WC				Elim							
10	Tinna Björk			2						Btm3	Elim								
11	Angela Ingibjörg			1					Btm3	Elim									
12	Margrét Guðrún				1				Elim										

Legend
Female	Male	Safe	Safe first	Safe second	Eliminated

== Season four ==
After three successive Idol stjörnuleit series in 2003-2004, 2004-2005 and 2005-2006, the program went on a hiatus to return for a fourth season in 2009.

Stage:		Semi Finals		Finals							
Weeks:		03/06	03/13	03/20	03/27	04/03	04/17	04/24	05/01	05/08	05/15
Place	Contestant	Result									
1	Hrafna		IN		Btm2			Btm3			Winner
2	Anna Hlín		IN		Btm3		Btm3		Btm2	Btm2	Runner-up
3	Guðrún Lísa		IN							Elim	
4	Matthías	IN						Btm2	Elim		
5	Sylvía Rún		IN			Btm2		Elim			
6-7	Árni Þór	IN		Btm3		Btm3	Elim				
6-7	Alexandra		WC				Elim				
8	Gylfi Þór	IN				Elim					
9	Georg Alexander	IN			Elim						
10-11	Ólöf Katrín		IN	Elim							
10-11	Stefán Þór	WC		Elim							
12	Sigurður	IN		Wd							

Legend
Female	Male	Safe	Safe first	Safe second	Eliminated	Withdrew
