= Sigmar Vilhjálmsson =

Icelandic television host

Sigmar Vilhjálmsson (born 3 January 1977 in Egilsstaðir, Iceland), nicknamed Simmi, is an Icelandic TV host. He is the son of Vilhjálmur Einarsson, silver medallist of the 1956 Summer Olympics in triple jump.

Sigmar is one of two hosts in the Idol Stjörnuleit TV program on the Stöð 2 station in Iceland. At an early age he started a radio morning show that became one of the most popular morning shows on the air and from there he started a TV show, 70 minutes, which was modelled on the Radio Show and is still running.
