= Wren T. Brown =

American actor and producer

- Born: Wren Troy Brown; June 11, 1964 (age 62); Los Angeles, California, U.S.
- Occupations: TV, film, theatre and voice actor; film producer; theatre director; co-founder and artistic director of the Ebony Repertory Theatre
- Years active: 1987–present
- Known for: Co-founder, the Ebony Repertory Theatre; Film actor, The Importance of Being Earnest (1992); TV actor, Whoopi (2003)
- Spouse: Anne (m. 1991)
- Children: 3

Wren Troy Brown (born June 11, 1964) is an American actor, film producer, theatre director and a musical theatre director, known for his work in film, television, and voice. He is also the producing artistic director of "the first and only African-American professional Equity theatre company in Los Angeles," the award-winning Ebony Repertory Theatre (ERT), which he and theatre director Israel Hicks co-founded in 2007 to create a "world-class professional theatre rooted in the experience of the African Diaspora." Most recently, in his debut book The Family Business, Four Generations of One Black Family's Artistic Odyssey, Brown shares the story of his family's more than 100-year journey in the arts, offering a look at the lasting impact of Black artists on American culture.

== Film acting ==
His film acting has included work in Hollywood Shuffle, co-written by Robert Townsend and Keenen Ivory Wayans in 1987; Forest Whitaker's 1995 Waiting to Exhale, and David Mamet's Edmond in 2007, which he appeared in with William H. Macy. Brown also acted in the drama The Dinner, the comedy dramas The Importance of Being Earnest (1992) and Heart and Souls; the romantic drama Beyond the Lights, the war drama A Midnight Clear; the action dramas Under Siege 2: Dark Territory and Biker Boyz and the horror films Hellraiser IV: Blood Legacy and HellBent.

== Television and voice acting ==
Brown has guest-starred or played recurring roles on The West Wing, The Practice, Frasier, Seinfeld, Charmed, Star Trek: Voyager, Curb Your Enthusiasm, Everybody Hates Chris, Grey's Anatomy, in addition to playing Whoopi Goldberg's brother Courtney Rae in five episodes of the 2003 television series Whoopi. Brown provided the voice of Homer Simpson's Black ancestor Virgil Simpson on The Simpsons, and he performed voice work for the Langston Hughes poem "The Negro Speaks of Rivers" on pianist Billy Childs' Grammy Award-nominated album I've Known Rivers.

== Theatre ==
Under his artistic direction, the Ebony Repertory Theatre has produced award-winning productions including August Wilson's Two Trains Running; Crowns, featuring the late Paula Kelly; A Raisin in the Sun, directed by Tony winner Phylicia Rashad; and the musicals The Gospel at Colonus and Five Guys Named Moe. In 2018, Brown's "theatre directing debut was made at Colorado's Lone Tree Arts Center with August Wilson's Fences." He has also directed for Ventura's Rubicon Theatre.

In 2021, Brown was one of four directors interviewed by ArtEquity and the Oregon Shakespeare Festival for the Talking Back Digital Series focusing on the impact of structural racism in theatres throughout the United States."

== Film producer ==
Brown served as associate producer on the Apartheid drama Boesman & Lena (2000), starring Danny Glover and Angela Bassett. Directed by John Berry, the film was praised for its stars "powerhouse" performances and "an unusually physical approach to theatrical material." His second was a concert film of Dianne Reeves' Grammy Award-winning album, In The Moment: Live in Concert.

== Books ==
The Family Business, Four Generations of One Black Family's Artistic Odyssey is a personal and intimate recount of Brown's stories and many never-before-seen images from his family’s four generations and more than 100-year artistic odyssey, shedding light on the significance and importance of the Black artist in American culture. The book features a prologue by Dr. Henry D. Miller, foreword by multiple Grammy Award®-winner Wynton Marsalis and an afterword by Tony Award®-winner Leslie Odom, Jr. (Hamilton). Delving into a rich tapestry of history, personal narratives, and striking visuals, The Family Business captures the essence of perseverance, particularly during the era of Jim Crow. With an extensive collection of rare and never-before-seen photographs and memorabilia drawn from Brown's personal archives, The Family Business serves as both a family scrapbook and a cultural artifact, illuminating the critical contributions of Black artistry and its enduring impact.

== Personal ==
A fourth-generation Angeleno, Brown is the son of jazz trumpeter Troy Brown Jr., and the grandson of actor-comedian Troy Brown Sr., who was also the fifth Black actor to join the Screen Actors Guild (SAG). His maternal grandmother, Ruth Givens, was a torch singer and dancer in film and at the Los Angeles Cotton Club. His maternal grandfather, Lee Young Sr., was the first black staff musician in Hollywood, in this case for Columbia Pictures in 1946, and the drummer and musical director for Nat King Cole. His great-grandfather, Willis Handy Young, was a musician and the owner of Vaudeville troupe the New Orleans Strutters.

As a Angeleno, he attended Alexander Hamilton High School in Los Angeles. While a senior there, he performed in the first national Chicken McNuggets commercial, in 1982.

Wren's close friendship with Angela Bassett was featured in a chapter in Best Friends, as well as Bassett's book Friends: A Love Story.

Married to wife Anne since October 12, 1991, the couple has three children together.
