= Sugarbaby (film) =

- Zuckerbaby
- Directed by: Percy Adlon
- Screenplay by: Percy Adlon; Gwendolyn von Ambesser
- Produced by: Eleonore Adlon
- Starring: Marianne Sägebrecht; Eisi Gulp
- Cinematography: Johanna Heer
- Edited by: Jean-Claude Piroué
- Music by: Dreieier
- Release date: 1985
- Running time: 82 mins
- Country: West Germany
- Language: German

Sugarbaby (original title: Zuckerbaby) is a 1985 West German film directed by Percy Adlon and starring Marianne Sägebrecht.

== Plot ==
Marianne is a middle-aged, overweight, slovenly and lonely assistant to a funeral director in Munich. Her life revolves around relaxing in an indoor swimming pool, commuting on the subway between her apartment and the funeral home, and munching candy bars in bed while watching television, which is how she revisits her teenage "crush" for the pop singer Peter Kraus and his hit "Sugar Baby".

On one trip she becomes aware of the train driver, attracted by his announcing voice. He is young, tall, lean and blond (not unlike Kraus), and Marianne becomes obsessed. By a process of subterfuge and detective work she learns his name (Huber), marital status (a cold, overbearing wife), and favorite candy bar. She starts taking exercise, dressing smartly and cooking regular meals. She learns to interpret the subway network's complicated shift roster, and makes a point of occasionally crossing his path, perhaps giving him a smile of recognition. She dresses up her drab apartment and installs a new double bed.

Marianne learns that Huber's wife will be away for two weeks on account of a death in the family, and puts her plan into action. At the vending machine she offers him the bar she has just bought ("I've changed my mind") and they go for a coffee. She invites him to come to dinner the next evening. She cooks a roast and sets the table for a romantic meal, but when he fails to arrive she breaks down sobbing, and furiously destroys the table setting and much else beside. The roast is burnt. Then he arrives, late because of an emergency at work.

They make love, and he moves in with her. She takes holidays, buys him new clothes, he takes her places on his Yamaha RD125DX motorcycle, and they share intimacies; her unhappy childhood and his fear of being the driver involved in an unavoidable fatality. They enjoy each other's company and she fantasizes a life together; they go to a rock 'n' roll dance evening, and when the band plays "Sugarbaby" they "let their hair down" and the other couples stand back to give them space. Frau Huber, who has returned and found Marianne's address in her husband's work jacket, storms in through the crowd, separates the couple and furiously assaults Marianne, Huber cowering among the onlookers. Leaving Marianne bruised and dazed on the dance floor, Frau Huber marches her husband out of the hall.

In the last scene, Marianne, still bruised, is standing on the edge of the platform, holding out a candy bar as the train approaches.

== Cast ==
- Marianne Sägebrecht as Marianne
- Eisi Gulp as Huber
- Toni Berger as mortician
- Manuela Denz as Frau Huber
- Will Spindler as train conductor
- Paul Würges as dance band leader

== Home media ==
The film, with English subtitles, was widely available on VHS in the 1990s.

The commercially available DVD Zuckerbaby (packaged with Out of Rosenheim/Bagdad Cafe and Rosalie Goes Shopping, both in English by Adlon and starring Sägebrecht) is not subtitled.

== Remakes ==
Baby Cakes is an American remake of Zuckerbaby, with a less memorable ending. That film inspired the 2004 song of the same name by the English band 3 of a Kind.
