= Nouvelle Star season 4 =

Nouvelle Star
- Season 4
- Hosted by: Benjamin Castaldi, Virginie Efira
- Winner: Christophe Willem
- Runner-up: Dominique Michalon

Release
- Original release: February 22 – June 8, 2006

Season chronology
- ← Previous; Season 3 Next → Season 5

The fourth season of Nouvelle Star began on February 22, 2006. All the judges returned to the panel and Benjamin Castaldi was set to host for a fourth time. However after the season went halfway through he was replaced by Virginie Efira on May 24. Auditions were held in the following cities:

Rennes (18 October 2005)
Marseille (31 October 2005)
Lille (6 November 2005)
Toulouse (14 November 2005)
Liège (21 November 2005)
Lyon (5 December 2005)
Paris (17 December 2005)

Due to problems with the voting lines the results from the original top 14, in which the 10 finalists were supposed to be determined, were voided and the four original eliminated contestants received a second chance in the following week which resulted in all of them making the cut while four original top 10 contestants were eliminated in the semifinals. In the end Christophe Willem who was never in the Bottom group triumphed over Dominique Michalon who was in the Bottom group before the finals.

== Contestants ==
Date	Bottom Five
30 March	Joana	Gaël Faure	Stéphanie Lipstadt	Válerie Castan	Dominique Michalon
5 April	Célia Perez	Jean-Charles Chapuis	Sophie	Vladimir Streiff	Beverly
	Bottom Three
13 April	Joana	Beverly	Stéphanie Lipstadt
19 April	Beverly (2)	Stéphanie Lipstadt (2)	Florian Lesca
28 April	Stéphanie Lipstadt (3)	Bruno Rua	Valérie Castan
4 May	Bruno Rua (2)	Valérie Castan (2)	Florian Lesca (2)
12 May	Florian Lesca (3)	Valérie Castan (3)	Dominique Michalon
18 May	Valérie Castan (4)	Cindy Santos
	Bottom Two
25 May	Cindy Santos (2)	Dominique Michalon (2)
31 May	Gaël Faure
8 June	Dominique Michalon (3)	Christophe Willem

== Elimination chart ==
Legend
Female	Male	Top 10	Top 14

Stage:		Top 14		Finals								
Week:		3/10	4/5	4/13	4/19	4/28	5/4	5/12	5/18	5/25	5/31	6/8
Place	Contestant	Result										
1	Christophe Willem	Viewers	Viewers									Winner
2	Dominique Michalon	Judges	Viewers					Btm 3		Btm 2		Runner-up
3	Gaël Faure	Saved	Viewers								Elim	
4	Cindy Santos	Viewers	Viewers						Btm 2	Elim		
5	Valérie Castan	Saved	Viewers			Btm 3	Btm 2	Btm 2	Elim			
6	Florian Lesca	Viewers	Viewers		Btm 2		Btm 3	Elim				
7	Bruno Rua	Viewers	Viewers			Btm 2	Elim					
8	Stéphanie Lipstadt	Saved	Viewers	Btm 2	Btm 3	Elim						
9	Beverly	Viewers	Judges	Btm 3	Elim							
10	Joana Boumendil	Saved	Viewers	Elim								
11-14	Célia Perez	Viewers	Elim									
11-14	Jean-Charles Chapuis	Viewers	Elim									
11-14	Sophie	Viewers	Elim									
11-14	Vladimir Streiff	Viewers	Elim									

=== Live show details ===
==== Pre Live Show 1 (30 March 2006) ====
Artist	Song (original artists)	Result
Beverly	"Fever" (Peggy Lee)	Safe
Bruno Rua	"Beautiful" (Christina Aguilera)	Safe
Célia Perez	"The Best" (Tina Turner)	Safe
Christophe Willem	"Sunny" (Bobby Hebb)	Safe
Cindy Santos	"Respect" (Aretha Franklin)	Safe
Dominique Michalon	"I Will Survive" (Gloria Gaynor)	Bottom five
Florian Lesca	"Éteins la lumière" (Axel Bauer)	Safe
Gaël Faure	"Pride (In the Name of Love)" (U2)	Eliminated
Jean-Charles Chapuis	"Tant qu'on rêve encore" (Le Roi Soleil)	Safe
Joana Boumendil	"Qui a le droit..." (Patrick Bruel)	Eliminated
Sophie Claret	"Whenever, Wherever" (Shakira)	Safe
Stéphanie Lipstadt	"Rich Girl" (Gwen Stefani)	Eliminated
Valérie Castan	"Une seule vie" (Gérald de Palmas)	Eliminated
Vladimir Streiff	"Prendre racine" (Calogero)	Safe

Notes

- The results from the original top 14 were voided due to problems with voting lines. Gaël Faure, Joana Boumendil, Stéphanie Lipstadt, Valérie Castan received a second chance in the following week.

==== Pre Live Show 2 (5 April 2006) ====
Artist	Song (original artists)	Result
Beverly	"Le dilemme" (Les Dix Commandements)	Bottom five
Bruno Rua	"Quand on a que l'amour" (Jacques Brel)	Safe
Célia Perez	"Mistral gagnant" (Renaud)	Eliminated
Christophe Willem	"Où sont les femmes?" (Patrick Juvet)	Safe
Cindy Santos	"Parle-moi" (Nâdiya)	Safe
Dominique Michalon	"Comme d'habitude" (Claude François)	Safe
Florian Lesca	"C'est comme ça" (Les Rita Mitsouko)	Safe
Gaël Faure	"Un autre monde" (Téléphone)	Safe
Jean-Charles Chapuis	"En apesanteur" (Calogero)	Eliminated
Joana Boumendil	"J’oublierai ton nom" (Johnny Hallyday)	Safe
Sophie Claret	"Dans un autre monde" (Celine Dion)	Eliminated
Stéphanie Lipstadt	"Tandem" (Vanessa Paradis)	Safe
Valérie Castan	"Caravane" (Raphaël)	Safe
Vladimir Streiff	"Sa raison d'être" (Pascal Obispo)	Eliminated

==== Live Show 1 (13 April 2006) ====
Theme:

Artist	Song (original artists)	Result
Beverly	"Can't Take My Eyes Off You" (Frankie Valli)	Bottom three
Bruno Rua	"Billie Jean" (Michael Jackson)	Safe
Christophe Willem	"True Colors" (Phil Collins)	Safe
Cindy Santos	"Diego libre dans sa tête" (France Gall)	Safe
Dominique Michalon	"Ella, elle l'a" (France Gall)	Safe
Florian Lesca	"Baby Jane" (Rod Stewart)	Safe
Gaël Faure	"Hélène" (Roch Voisine)	Safe
Joana Boumendil	"Flashdance... What a Feeling" (Irene Cara)	Eliminated
Stéphanie Lipstadt	"Tous les cris les SOS" (Daniel Balavoine)	Bottom two
Valérie Castan	"Encore et encore" (Francis Cabrel)	Safe

==== Live Show 2 (19 April 2006) ====
Theme:

Artist	Song (original artists)	Result
Beverly	"Roxanne" (The Police)	Eliminated
Bruno Rua	"Goodbye My Lover" (James Blunt)	Safe
Christophe Willem	"Ça plane pour moi" (Plastic Bertrand)	Safe
Cindy Santos	"Bohemian Rhapsody" (Queen)	Safe
Dominique Michalon	"We Don't Need Another Hero" (Tina Turner)	Safe
Florian Lesca	"Gabrielle" (Johnny Hallyday)	Bottom two
Gaël Faure	"Rock DJ" (Robbie Williams)	Safe
Stéphanie Lipstadt	"Poupée de cire, poupée de son" (France Gall)	Bottom three
Valérie Castan	"Contact" (Kyo)	Safe

==== Live Show 3 (28 April 2006) ====
Theme:

Artist	Song (original artists)	Result
Bruno Rua	"Angels" (Robbie Williams)	Bottom two
Christophe Willem	"I Am What I Am" (George Hearn)	Safe
Cindy Santos	"Hot Stuff" (Donna Summer)	Safe
Dominique Michalon	"I'm Every Woman" (Chaka Khan)	Safe
Florian Lesca	"Femmes, je vous aime" (Julien Clerc)	Safe
Gaël Faure	"Lucie" (Pascal Obispo)	Safe
Stéphanie Lipstadt	"Désenchantée" (Mylène Farmer)	Eliminated
Valérie Castan	"One" (U2)	Bottom three

==== Live Show 4 (4 May 2006) ====
Theme:

Artist	Song (original artists)	Result
Bruno Rua	"Sex Bomb" (Tom Jones)	Eliminated
Christophe Willem	"New York, New York" (Frank Sinatra)	Safe
Cindy Santos	"Ne retiens pas tes larmes" (Amel Bent)	Safe
Dominique Michalon	"It's Raining Men" (The Weather Girls)	Safe
Florian Lesca	"Et maintenant" (Gilbert Bécaud)	Bottom three
Gaël Faure	"Don't Let the Sun Go Down on Me" (Elton John)	Safe
Valérie Castan	"La vie ne m'apprend rien" (Liane Foly)	Bottom two

==== Live Show 5 (12 May 2006) ====
Theme:

Artist	First song (original artists)	Second song	Result
Christophe Willem	"Goodbye Marilou" (Michel Polnareff)	"I Will Always Love You" (Whitney Houston)	Safe
Cindy Santos	"Le chanson de Ziggy" (Éric Estève)	"Sorry" (Madonna)	Safe
Dominique Michalon	"Hymne à l'amour" (Édith Piaf)	"I'm Outta Love" (Anastacia)	Bottom three
Florian Lesca	"Desire" (U2)	"Parle moi" (Jean-Louis Aubert)	Eliminated
Gaël Faure	"Oh, Pretty Woman" (Roy Orbison)	"Et un jour, une femme" (Florent Pagny)	Safe
Valérie Castan	"Rodéo" (Zazie)	"Every Breath You Take" (The Police)	Bottom two

==== Live Show 6 (18 May 2006) ====
Theme:

Artist	First song (original artists)	Second song	Result
Christophe Willem	"My Heart Will Go On" (Celine Dion)	"Stayin' Alive" (Bee Gees)	Safe
Cindy Santos	"Fame" (Irene Cara)	"Kissing You" (Des'ree)	Bottom two
Dominique Michalon	"Salma Ya Salama" (Dalida)	"I Have Nothing" (Whitney Houston)	Safe
Gaël Faure	"Your Song" (Elton John)	"New York avec toi" (Téléphone)	Safe
Valérie Castan	"Quelque chose de Tennessee" (Johnny Hallyday)	"A Thousand Miles" (Vanessa Carlton)	Eliminated

==== Live Show 7 (25 May 2006) ====
Theme:

Artist	First song (original artists)	Second song	Result
Christophe Willem	"Memory" (Elaine Paige)	"I Want You Back" (The Jackson 5)	Safe
Cindy Santos	"Chanter pour ceux qui sont loin de chez eux" (Lââm)	"Survivor" (Destiny's Child)	Eliminated
Dominique Michalon	"I Got You (I Feel Good)" (James Brown)	"Ma révérence" (Véronique Sanson)	Bottom two
Gaël Faure	"Caruso" (Lucio Dalla)	"Faith" (George Michael)	Safe

==== Live Show 8: Semi-final (31 May 2006) ====
Theme:

Artist	First song (original artists)	Second song	Result
Christophe Willem	"I'm Still Standing" (Elton John)	"Pour ne pas vivre seul" (Dalida)	Safe
Dominique Michalon	"What's Love Got to Do with It" (Tina Turner)	"Calling You" (Jevetta Steele)	Safe
Gaël Faure	"Feel" (Robbie Williams)	"Je te promets" (Johnny Hallyday)	Eliminated

==== Live final (8 June 2006) ====
Artist	First song	Second song	Third song	Result
Christophe Willem	"Born to Be Alive"	"La chanson des vieux amants"	"Last Dance"	Winner
Dominique Michalon	"All Night Long (All Night)"	"La Quête"	"Hero"	Runner-up
