= Miss Dominique =

- Born: Dominique Michalon; 7 September 1978 (age 47)
- Origin: Sarcelles, France
- Genres: Pop, R&B, Gospel
- Occupation: Singer-songwriter,
- Years active: 1998—present
- Labels: Blue Silver (1998); 2006 Sony BMG

Dominique Michalon (born 7 September 1978), known professionally as Miss Dominique, is a French singer. She finished in second place on season 4 of Nouvelle Star in 2006.

== Early life ==
Michalon was born on 7 September 1978 in Sarcelles. She started singing when her parents sent her to a gospel chorus. At 8, she was in her first concert, the "bébés chérubins" in Sarcelles (a suburb of Paris).

She is also known by the stage name "Beth Sheba". She sang in a masterclass in Louisiana in the United States. Later, her band, "Beth-Shéba and Les Gospel Wave Singers" toured with Ray Charles and Manu Dibango. In 1998, she released an album "A Chans' ou an destin'" in Martinique as Beth Sheba.

== Nouvelle Star ==
On her audition, Michalon's performance of Whitney Houston's "I Have Nothing" marked her as a favorite; judge Marianne James cried and said "Alleluia". Many felt that her best performance was "Calling You" from Bagdad Café. Despite this, Dominique lost in the final round to Christophe Willem. There have been claims that Dominique's chance of winning were significantly reduced because her home, Martinique was not allowed to vote.

=== Performances ===
- Top 14 : I Will Survive (Gloria Gaynor)
- Top 14 redux : Comme d'habitude (Claude François)
- Top 10 : Ella, Elle l'a (France Gall)
- Top 9 : We Don't Need Another Hero (Tina Turner)
- Top 8 : I'm Every Woman (Whitney Houston)
- Top 7 : It's Raining Men (The Weather Girls)
- Top 6 : L' Hymne à l'Amour (Edith Piaf), I'm Outta Love (Anastacia)
- Top 5 : GoldenEye (Tina Turner), Salma ya Salama (Dalida), I Have Nothing (Whitney Houston)
- Top 4 : Ma Révérence (Véronique Sanson), I Feel Good (James Brown)
- Top 3 : What's Love Got To Do With It (Tina Turner), Calling You (Bagdad Café)
- Top 2 : All Night Long (Lionel Richie), La Quête, Hero (Mariah Carey)

== After Nouvelle Star ==
She recorded an album Une femme battante (#9 FR) which was released on 13 November 2006. She backed French conservative candidate Nicolas Sarkozy during his campaign for the 2007 presidential elections and was among the singers who sang to celebrate his victory over Ségolène Royal the night of his election. Michalon took part in a TV reality show called la ferme celebrité.

In 2008, the singer decided to follow a strict diet recommended by her doctor and managed to lose more than 110 pounds (50 kg) in a space of a year.

== Discography ==
=== Albums ===
Album	Singles
Une femme battante: Released: 13 November 2006; Peak chart positions: #8 France; French sales: 150 000 copies	"It's a Man's Man's World"
