= Ebony Repertory Theatre =

Theatre company in Los Angeles, California

Ebony Repertory Theatre at the Nate Holden Performing Arts Center
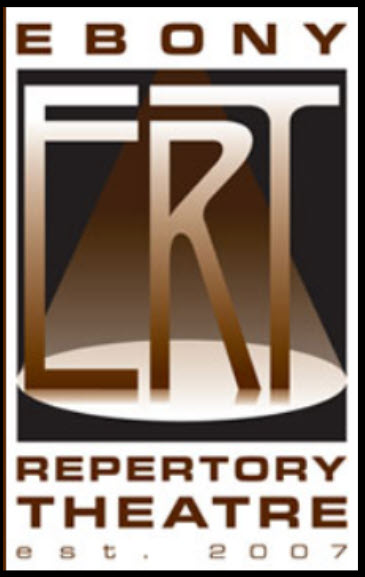

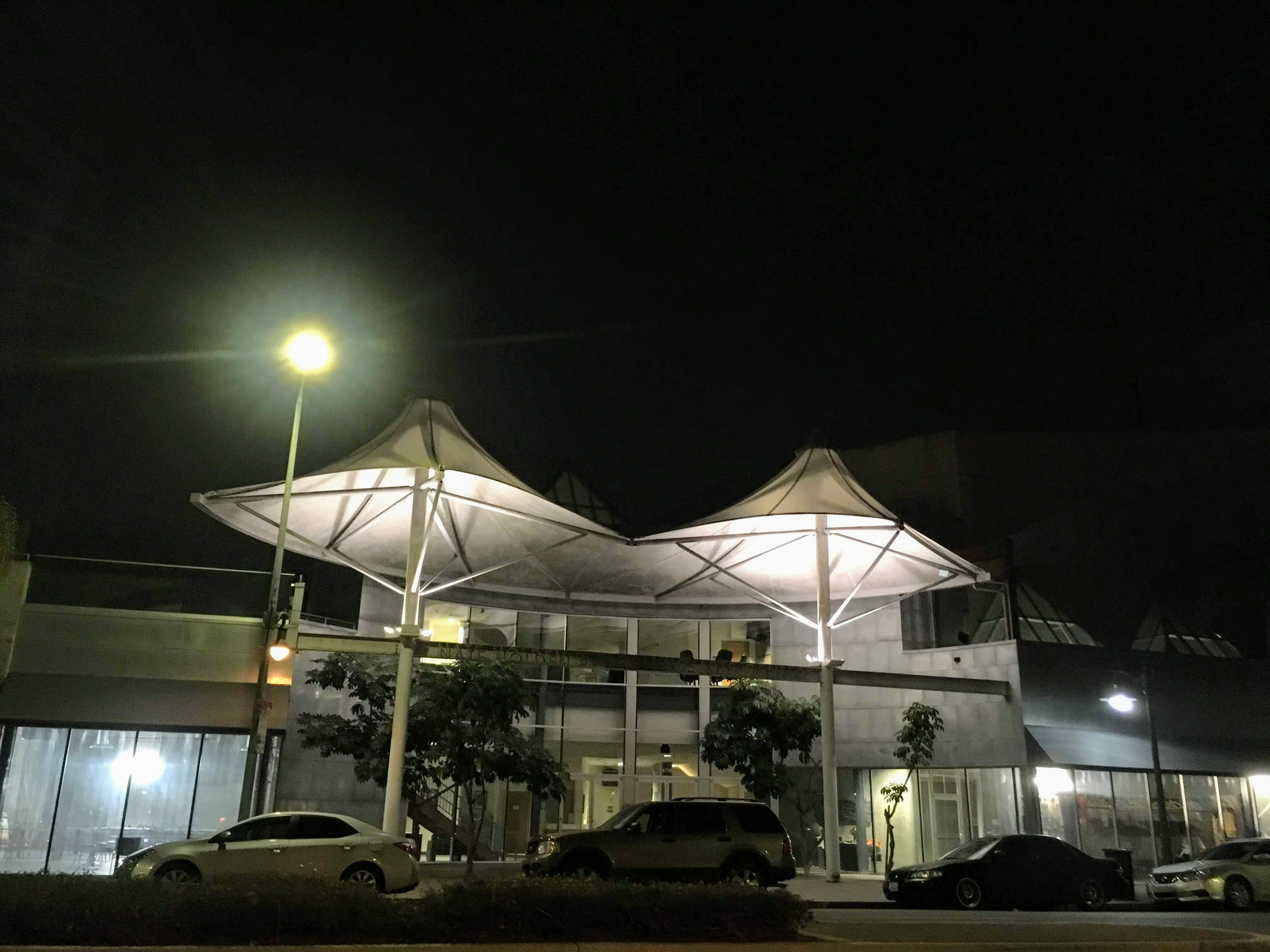
- Interactive map of Ebony Repertory Theatre at the Nate Holden Performing Arts Center
- Address: 4718 West Washington Blvd; Los Angeles, California; United States
- Coordinates: 34.0395836°N 118.3420399°W
- Owner: City of Los Angeles
- Operator: Ebony Repertory Theatre
- Capacity: 400
- Type: Regional theater

Construction
- Opened: 2007

Website
- ebonyrep.org

Ebony Repertory Theatre (ERT) is a non-profit theatre company founded in June 2007 by Wren T. Brown and the late Israel Hicks. ERT is the resident company and operator of the Nate Holden Performing Arts Center, a 400-seat regional theatre in Los Angeles, California's Mid-City community. ERT, whose award-winning theatre is its cornerstone, is the only African American professional theatre company (Actors Equity) in Los Angeles. ERT also presents a music series, a dance series, lecture series and other perennial programming. Under the leadership of Producing Artistic Director, Wren T. Brown, ERT "seeks to bring diverse, high standard, professional performing arts to the Mid-City community..."

ERT is known for productions featuring performances by theatre, film and television actors, including Tony Award winners Roger Robinson, Ruben Santiago Hudson, L. Scott Caldwell, Leslie Odom Jr., Phylicia Rashad, Billy Porter and Garth Fagan, Emmy Award winners, Obba Babatunde, Blair Underwood, Keith David, Paula Kelly, Glynn Turman, Loretta Devine and Levar Burton, GRAMMY Award winners Dianne Reeves, Billy Childs, India Arie, Levar Burton and Blair Underwood, NEA Jazz Masters Award Winner Ahmad Jamal and Academy Award winner Ruth E. Carter.

ERT's mission is "To create, develop, nurture and sustain a world-class professional theatre rooted in the experience of the African diaspora." Its goal is "To build and expand a multicultural audience that contributes to the cultural understanding among people of diverse backgrounds."

== Awards and nominations ==
Year	Awards	Production	Nominations	Wins	Notes
2009	Ovation Awards	Two Trains Running	4	2	Won for Production of a Play-Large Theatre and Lead Actor in a Play (Glynn Turman); nominated for Director (Israel Hicks) and Featured Actor (Roger Robinson)
2009	NAACP Theatre Awards	Two Trains Running		3	Won for Best Producer (ERT & Wren T. Brown), Best Director (Israel Hicks), Best Scenic Design (Edward E. Haynes, Jr.)
2010	NAACP Theatre Awards	Crowns	1	1	Won for Best Ensemble Cast
2011	Ovation Awards	A Raisin in the Sun	6	2	Won for Best Play-Large Theatre and Featured Actress in a Play (Deidrie Henry)
2011	Los Angeles Drama Critics Circle Award	A Raisin in the Sun	8	4	Won for Lead (L. Scott Caldwell), Featured (Deidrie Henry) and Ensemble Performance and McCulloh Award For Revival
2013	NAACP Theatre Awards	Fraternity	4	1	Won for Best Producer (ERT & Wren T. Brown); nominated for Best Leading Male Rocky Carroll and Roger Robinson; nominated for Best Supporting Male Robert Gossett and Mel Winkler
2015	Ovation Awards	The Gospel at Colonus	11	3	Won for Featured Actor in a Musical (Samuel Butler), Featured Actress in a Musical (Nicoe Potts) and Music Direction (Abdul Hamid Royal); nominated for Best Production of a Musical (Large Theatre)
2015	Los Angeles Drama Critics Circle Award	The Gospel at Colonus	1	1	Won for Music Direction (Abdul Hamid Royal); nominated for Theatrical Excellence
2018	Ovation Awards	Five Guys Named Moe	8	2	Won for Acting Ensemble of a Musical and Featured Actor in a Musical (Rogelio Douglas Jr); nominated for Best Production of a Musical (Large Theatre)
2018	NAACP Theatre Award	Five Guys Named Moe		1	Won for Best Supporting Male (Rogelio Douglas Jr.)
