= The Importance of Being Earnest (disambiguation) =

The Importance of Being Earnest is an 1895 play by Oscar Wilde.

The Importance of Being Earnest may also refer to:

- The Importance of Being Earnest (1932 film), directed by Franz Wenzler
- The Importance of Being Earnest (1952 film), directed by Anthony Asquith
- The Importance of Being Earnest (1957 film), an Australian TV performance of the play
- The Importance of Being Earnest (1992 film), directed by Kurt Baker
- The Importance of Being Earnest (2002 film), directed by Oliver Parker
- The Importance of Being Earnest (2011 film), directed by Brian Bedford
- The Importance of Being Earnest (opera), a 2011 opera by Gerald Barry

== See also ==
- The Importance of Being Ernest, a 1959 album by Ernest Tubb
- "The Importance of Not Being Too Earnest", an episode of Dawson's Creek
