= Mahler on the Couch =

- Film poster
- German: Mahler auf der Couch
- Directed by: Felix Adlon; Percy Adlon
- Written by: Felix Adlon; Percy Adlon
- Produced by: Eleonore Adlon; Burkhard W.R. Ernst; Konstantin Seitz
- Starring: Johannes Silberschneider; Barbara Romaner; Karl Markovics; Friedrich Mücke
- Cinematography: Benedict Neuenfels
- Edited by: Jochen Kunstler
- Release date: 24 June 2010 (Los Angeles Film Festival)
- Running time: 98 min
- Country: Germany
- Language: German

Mahler on the Couch (German: Mahler auf der Couch) is a 2010 German film directed by Percy Adlon and Felix Adlon. It is a historical drama depicting an affair between Alma Mahler and Walter Gropius, and the subsequent psychoanalysis of Mahler's husband Gustav Mahler by Sigmund Freud.

== Historical accuracy ==
The affair between Alma Mahler and Walter Gropius did occur, and Gustav Mahler did consult Freud. Alma did marry Gropius several years after Gustav's death. Ty Burr pointed out in his review of the film, "No one actually knows what Mahler and Freud talked about in their meeting." Jeffrey Gantz made much the same point.

The film focuses on Gustav Mahler's demand that Alma give up her own artistic efforts (composing songs) to live a more traditional life as a wife and mother, and on the stress this caused in their marriage. There is some historical support for this concept. In a biography of Alma, Oliver Hilmes writes: "In her diaries, the echo of an authentically felt as well as an alleged loss of 'her' music resounds ... 'My heart stood still,' she noted in her diary, 'Give up – give away – my music, the thing I have lived for till now. My first thought was – write him off.'" But Hilmes goes on to say, "Later Alma put the legend into the world – and that is what makes it so hard to fathom the truth of her entries – that Mahler had forbidden her from composing. Today we can see from Mahler's Dresden letter just how groundless this claim is." And there were other sources of strain: Hilmes mentions "…a lifelong hostile rivalry between Alma and Mahler's close friends."

After Gustav Mahler's death in May 1911, Alma carried on a correspondence with Gropius while she was having a multi-year affair and living with Oskar Kokoschka. She married Gropius on 18 May 1915. Hilmes describes the marriage as "over before it could even begin". Hilmes concludes that the marriage had "much more to do with a social, in any case exterior convention that had her thinking she needed to marry again ... Love ... was just not part of the game." None of these complexities are dealt with in the film.

Alma Mahler stirred strong passions in many who knew her, both positive and negative. Hilmes asks "How can one person provoke such paeans of love on the one hand, and such tirades of loathing on the other?" Hilmes goes on to say "The list of contemporaries – husbands, lovers hangers-on, and satellites – who crossed paths with Alma Mahler-Werfel ... is long and reads like a 'Who's Who in the Twentieth Century'." This causes Kirk Honeycutt to comment that the film is a "crowded cocktail party of famous names".

== Critical reception ==
In a review for The New York Times, David DeWitt wrote: "The scenes with Karl Markovics, as Freud, are the lingering appeal of this artfully composed film, framed with aesthetic care and scored with Mahler's music..." and "For all its drama (and creative filmmaking), the crisis that Mahler describes plays out airy and rote. Mr. Silberschneider and Ms. Romaner are clearly strong actors, but a core spontaneity seems missing, and their emoting veers toward melodrama."

In a review for Boston.com, Ty Burr wrote:

It's an over-stylized and overwrought affair, and intentionally so — any other approach probably wouldn't play fair to the music or these tempestuous lives... The problem ... is that it's really Alma's story, not Gustav's, and [the film's] framing sequences become a distraction. As portrayed alarmingly and well by Barbara Romaner, the character's not a great beauty but a seductive, destructive life force whose sexuality bursts the constraints of her time.

In a review for The Hollywood Reporter, Kirk Honeycutt wrote:

Mahler on the Couch ... manages to pose a serious, intimate study in obsessive jealousy while, like a gaga celebrity hunter, bumping into just about everybody who's anybody in Viennese society circa 1910... The film's great gift, though, is Romaner... She fully inhabits the role of this complex personality whose passion for love and art collides with her role of wife and mother.

In a review for the Boston Phoenix, Jeffrey Gantz commented on some of the discrepancies between the film and history, concluding: "Mahler on the Couch doesn't plumb any psychological depths. It's a decent addition to the modest list of films about the composer, but no substitute for Mahler, Ken Russell's 1974 comic-strip classic."

== See also ==
- Mahler (1974 film by Ken Russell)
