= Johannes Silberschneider =

Austrian actor

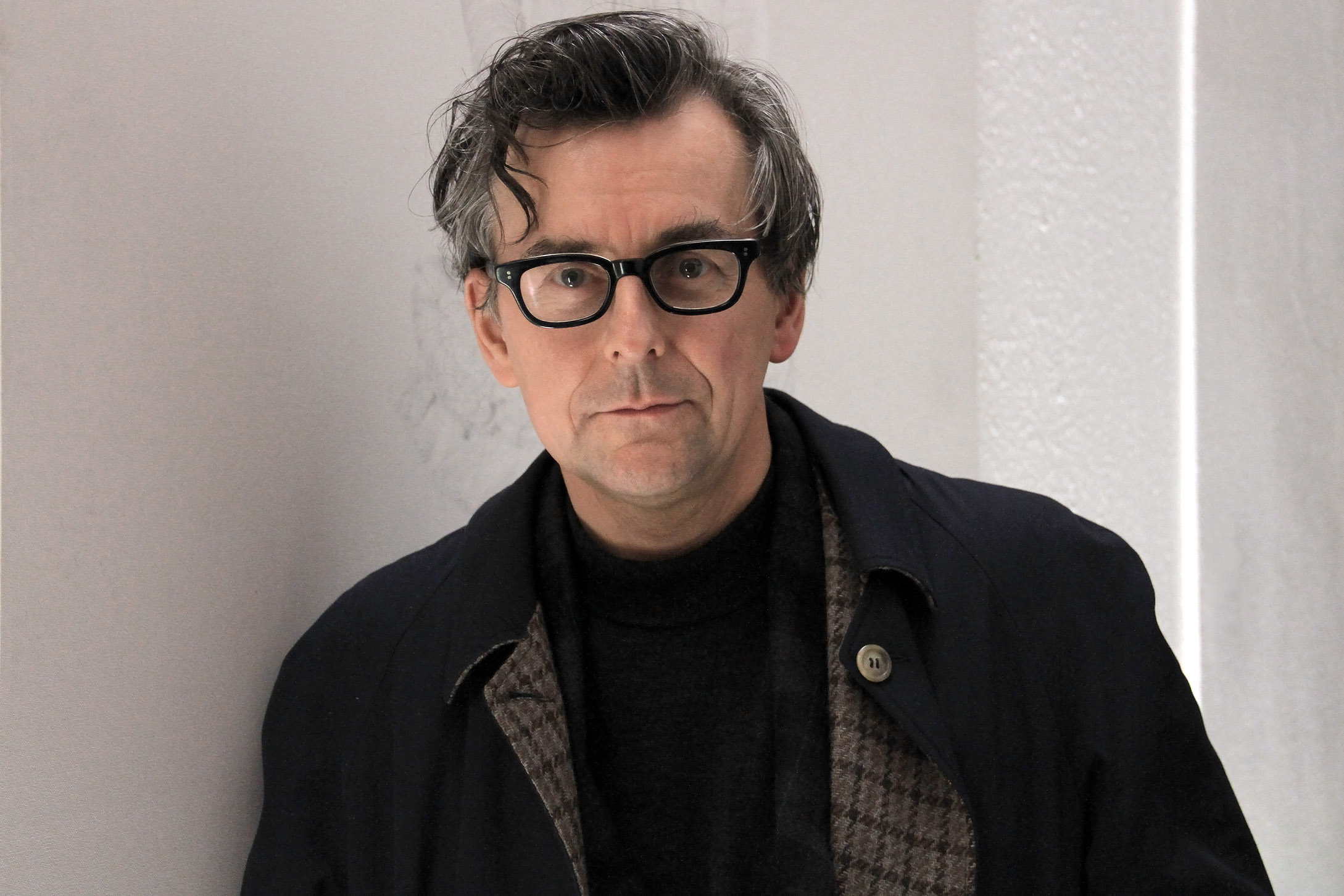
- Silberschneider in 2012
- Born: 13 December 1958 (age 66); Styria, Austria
- Other names: Humphrey Silberschneider
- Occupation: Actor
- Years active: 1982–present

Johannes Silberschneider (born 13 December 1958 in Styria, Austria), is an Austrian actor.

He studied acting at the Max Reinhardt Seminar.

He has appeared in many films and TV films and serials. His motion picture appearances include in The Red Violin (1998), Desperados On the Block (2009), Mahler On the Couch (2010) and Luisa Sanfelice (2004). Television credits include the role of Johannes Kleiman in Anne Frank: The Whole Story (2001), and Kreuzfeuer (1997) in which he played Lamoth.
