= Bob Telson =

American composer, songwriter and pianist (born 1949)

- Born: May 14, 1949 (age 77); Cannes, France
- Genres: World music; theatrical; classical
- Occupations: Composer; musician
- Instrument: Piano
- Years active: 1968–present
- Labels: Acqua; Nonesuch; Island, Warner; Naxos
- Website: www.bobtelson.com

Robert Eria Telson (born May 14, 1949) is an American composer, songwriter, and pianist best known for his work in musical theater and film, for which he has received Tony, Pulitzer, and Academy Award nominations.

== Biography ==
Robert Eria Telson was born in Cannes, France, in 1949. He grew up in Brooklyn, New York, son of Paula (née Blackman) and David Telson. He began studying piano when he was five years old. By nine he had already performed a Mozart piece on television and given a concert of his own compositions. At 14, he wrote 72 love songs for his first girlfriend, Margie. At 16 and 17 he studied organ, counterpoint and harmony in France with Nadia Boulanger. He followed this with a degree in music from Harvard University in 1970. Telson also played organ and composed original songs for a rock band called The Bristols, while he was a high school student at Poly Prep in Brooklyn, New York. Several of these were recorded at Decca Studios but never released. At Harvard, he formed another group called Groundspeed, which brought him back to the Decca Studios in 1967 to record a demo recording of his songs "L-12 East" and "In a Dream" with producer Dick Jacobs. This was released by the label in 1968. After the demise of Groundspeed, Telson formed the band Revolutionary Music Collective, which included then-unknown singer Bonnie Raitt on lead vocals.

After graduation from Harvard, Telson's first professional work was as a member of the Philip Glass Ensemble from 1972 to 1974. After that began his immersion in ethnic world music, as the pianist of salsa bandleaders Tito Puente and Machito. He was then organist of the gospel group Five Blind Boys of Alabama, for whom he also composed, arranged and produced. Collaborating with director/writer Lee Breuer, in 1983 he composed the musical The Gospel at Colonus, an adaptation of Sophocles's Oedipus tale, featuring Morgan Freeman, the Five Blind Boys and the Soul Stirrers. Newsweek called it: "The best white man’s capturings of the essence of black music since Gershwin's Porgy and Bess."

"Calling You"
An instrumental rendition of "Calling You" from Bagdad Café by Claude Reid.

As a composer, Telson received an Academy Award nomination for his song "Calling You" from the movie Bagdad Café, as well as Pulitzer, Grammy and Tony Award nominations for his Broadway musicals, The Gospel at Colonus and Chronicle of a Death Foretold, an adaptation of the Gabriel García Márquez novel.

Telson has composed soundtracks for American, French, German and Argentinian films (including five for Percy Adlon), as well as a ballet score for Twyla Tharp (Sextet) . His songs have been recorded by many international artists, such as Barbra Streisand, Natalie Cole, George Benson, Joe Cocker, Celine Dion, Wynton Marsalis, k.d. lang, Shawn Colvin, Caetano Veloso, Gal Costa, Etta James, Jeff Buckley, Paul Young and George Michael.

According to The New York Times: "Mr. Telson has a remarkable talent for relating to musicians from diverse musical cultures and for writing stirring, dramatic music in non-Western European idioms." They also described his music as "a compendium of world music styles brilliantly reimagined, embellished and sometimes made to overlap by Mr. Telson, a classically trained American composer and multi-instrumentalist".

== Current work ==
Telson's latest CDs, "Bantú," and "Desafiando las Distancias, Part II," were released in December 2024. His new musical, "Bantú," with libretto and lyrics by Graciela Corso, was presented in New York in October 2023, and in Uruguay in November, 2024.

== Musical theater ==
- Sister Suzie Cinema – premiere: 1980 NY Public Theater / collaboration with Lee Breuer
- The Gospel at Colonus – 1983 Brooklyn Academy of Music / collaboration with Lee Breuer/ 1988 Broadway, still touring internationally
- The Warrior Ant – 1988 Brooklyn Academy of Music/ collaboration with Lee Breuer
- Chronicle of a Death Foretold – 1995 Broadway/ produced by Lincoln Center
- Bagdad Cafe the Musical: toured in Europe 2004–06/ collaboration with Percy Adlon and Lee Breuer
- Bantú: with libretto and lyrics by Graciela Corso, presented in concert version in New York, October 2023, and in Uruguay in November, 2024

== Discography ==
- The Gospel at Colonus (original cast recording) (Nonesuch, 1988)
- Bagdad Cafe (soundtrack) (Island Records, 1989)
- Calling You (Warner Bros., 1992)
- An Ant Alone: Songs from the Warrior Ant (Little Village) (Rykodisk, 1991)
- La Vida Según Muriel (soundtrack) (Polygram, 1997)
- Trip (Isabel de Sebastian & Bob Telson) (Acqua, 2008)
- Old LP (Acqua (2012), Naxos (2012))
- American Dreamers (CD Baby, 2016)
- Defying the Distances (2019)
- Bantú (2024)
- Desafiando las Distancias Part II (2024)
