= Marianne Sägebrecht =

German actress (born 1945)

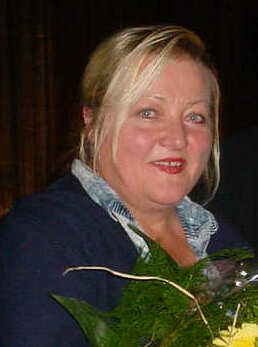
- Marianne Sägebrecht, 2003
- Born: 27 August 1945 (age 81); Starnberg, Bavaria, Germany
- Years active: 1973–present
- Spouse(s): Fritz Sägebrecht(1964–1976; divorced); 1 child
- Children: 1

Marianne Sägebrecht (German: [ma.ˈʁi̯a.nə ˈzɛːɡəˌbʁɛçt]; born 27 August 1945) is a German film actress.

== Career ==
Sägebrecht was a producer and performer of avant-garde theater and cabaret revues, particularly with the troupe Opera Curiosa. Spotted by director Percy Adlon in a 1977 production of Adele Spitzeder, Sägebrecht was cast as Madame Sanchez/Mrs. Sancho Panza in Adlon's TV special Herr Kischott (1979), a spin on Don Quixote. The director cast her in his 1983 feature The Swing in a small role and then in the leading role of Marianne, an overweight mortician in love with a subway conductor, in Sugarbaby (1985).

In 1987 she co-starred in the comedy drama Bagdad Café. Other roles include appearances in Paul Mazursky's Moon over Parador (1988) and Danny DeVito's The War of the Roses (1989).

Returning to Germany, she played a timid maid in the 1930s who marries her Jewish employer for convenience then falls in love in Martha and I (1990; released in the US in 1995). Sägebrecht headlined the black comedy as an unhappy wife whose straying husband plots her death in Mona Must Die (1994) and had small supporting parts in The Ogre (1996) and Left Luggage (1998).

In 1997, she was a member of the jury at the 47th Berlin International Film Festival.

== Filmography ==
- The Swing (1983) - Tandlerin
- Ein irres Feeling (1984) - Alfa's Mother
- Im Himmel ist die Hölle los (1984) - Journalist*
- Sugarbaby (a.k.a. Zuckerbaby) (1985) - lead role of Marianne
- Bagdad Café (a.k.a. Out of Rosenheim) (1987) - lead role of Jasmin
- Crazy Boys (1987) - Frl. Hermann
- Moon Over Parador (1988) - Magda
- The War of the Roses (1989) - Susan
- Rosalie Goes Shopping (1989) - lead role of Rosalie Greenspace
- Martha and I (1991) - Martha
- La Vida láctea (1992) - Aloha
- Dust Devil (1992) - Dr. Leidzinger
- Mr. Bluesman (1993) - Emma
- Erotique (1994) - Hilde (segment "Taboo Parlor")
- Mona Must Die (1994) - Mona von Snead
- Eine Mutter kämpft um ihren Sohn (1994) - Marion Bruckmüller
- All Men are Mortal (1995) - Annie
- Beauville (1995)
- Luise and the Jackpot (1995) - Luise
- The Ogre (1996) - Mrs. Netta
- Soleil (1997) - Tata Jeannette
- Lorenz im Land der Lügner (1997) - Tante Martha
- Johnny (1997)
- Spanish Fly (1998) - Rosa
- Left Luggage (1998) - Chaya's Mother
- From the Depths to the Heights (1999) - Elli Schulze
- Asterix and Obelix vs Caesar (1999) - Bonnemine (Gutemine)
- Private Lies (2001) - Betty
- Großglocknerliebe (2003) - Anneliese
- Marga Engel kocht vor Wut (2003) - Marga Engel
- Marga Engel gibt nicht auf (2004) - Marga Engel
- Charlotte und ihre Männer (2005) - Charlotte
- Bezaubernde Marie (2007) - Marie Meyer
- Das Geheimnis meiner Schwester (2007) - Antonia Wiedemann
- Immer Wirbel um Marie (2008) - Marie Meyer
- In aller Freundschaft (2008) - Helga Schulze
- Frau Holle (2008) - Frau Holle
- Oh, What a Mess (2009) - Sarah Silberschatz
- Omamamia (2012) - Marguerita
- Pettson & Findus: Fun Stuff (2014) - Beda
- The Circle (2014) - Erika
