= Whoopi (TV series) =

American television sitcom (2003–2004)

- Genre: Sitcom
- Created by: Bonnie and Terry Turner
- Developed by: Whoopi Goldberg
- Directed by: Terry Hughes
- Starring: Whoopi Goldberg; Wren T. Brown; Elizabeth Regen; Omid Djalili
- Opening theme: "Whoopi" by Whoopi Goldberg
- Composer: Ahrin Mishan
- Country of origin: United States
- Original language: English
- No. of seasons: 1
- No. of episodes: 22

Production
- Executive producers: Whoopi Goldberg; Bonnie and Terry Turner; Marcy Carsey; Tom Werner; Caryn Mandabach (Note: First four episodes only.); Terry Hughes; Larry Wilmore (Note: From episode two onwards.)
- Production location: Kaufman Astoria Studios
- Camera setup: Multi-camera
- Running time: 24 minutes
- Production companies: One Ho Productions; NBC Studios; Carsey-Werner-Mandabach

Original release
- Network: NBC
- Release: September 9, 2003 – April 20, 2004

Whoopi is an American television sitcom created by Bonnie and Terry Turner and starring Whoopi Goldberg that aired for one season on NBC. The series premiered on September 9, 2003, and ran until April 20, 2004. It was canceled by NBC in May 2004. The series revolved around the events and people at her hotel, the fictional Lamont Hotel, in New York City.

== Premise ==
Whoopi Goldberg starred in this comedy as one-hit wonder Mavis Rae, a cigarette-smoking, alcohol-drinking, menopausal and especially opinionated hotelier. In 1986, Mavis had one huge, spectacular hit song, the two-time Grammy Award-winning "Don't Hide Love". Quickly realizing that her initial success was a fluke, she parlayed her finances from that hit into purchasing the Lamont Hotel in Manhattan.

Mavis operates the hotel on her charm and wit while assisted by Persian handyman Nasim (Omid Djalili) and Eastern European housekeeper Jadwiga (Gordana Rashovich), who share a love-hate relationship with each other. Staying at the hotel is her baby brother Courtney (Wren T. Brown), a moderate Republican attorney who attempting to get back on his feet after being laid off from Enron amidst its bankruptcy scandal. Courtney begins dating medical imager Rita Nash (Elizabeth Regen), who spoke jive and was portrayed with an exaggerated urban black stereotype despite the fact that she was white. Rita and Mavis frequently clashed over the course of the series, leading to many of the conflicts that drove the plot of each episode. Other plots revolved around political clashes between the conservative Courtney and the liberal Mavis; post-9/11 Islamophobia that is faced by Nasim, who was often mistaken for an Arab; and, after its introduction in a later episode, the all-female poker group that Mavis and Rita belong to.

== Cast ==
=== Main ===
- Whoopi Goldberg as Mavis Rae
- Wren T. Brown as Courtney Rae
- Elizabeth Regen as Rita Nash
- Omid Djalili as Nasim Khatenjami

=== Recurring ===
- Gordana Rashovich as Jadwiga (Note: Although she appeared in every episode but the pilot, Rashovich was credited as a guest star.)
- Mary Testa as Sophia (Note: Although she appeared in all but the first and third episodes, Testa was credited as a guest star.)
- MaryAnn Hu as Soo Lin
- Danielle Lee Greaves as Danielle

=== Notable guest stars ===
- Enrico Colantoni as Victor the appliance salesman ("Pilot")
- Anson Carter, Scott Gomez, Darius Kasparaitis, Jay Pandolfo, and Scott Stevens as themselves ("Smoke Gets in Your Eyes")
- Sheryl Lee Ralph as Florence Lamarck, Mavis' former bandmate ("She Ain't Heavy, She's My Partner")
  - Ralph had previously worked with Goldberg in 1993's Sister Act 2: Back in the Habit.
- Diahann Carroll as Viveca Rae, Mavis and Courtney's mother ("Mother's Little Helper")
- Carl Gordon as Lawrence Rae, Mavis and Courtney's father ("Mother's Little Helper")
- Rue McClanahan and Eli Wallach as hotel guests using marijuana with a group of "ill" seniors ("American Woman")
  - Wallach had previously worked with Goldberg in 1996's The Associate.
- Patrick Swayze as Tony, Mavis' former choreographer and lover ("The Last Dance")
  - Swayze had previously worked with Goldberg in 1990's Ghost.
- Celeste Holm as Diana, an elderly tenant of the hotel ("The Squatter")
  - Both Holm and Goldberg are winners of the Academy Award for Best Supporting Actress.
- Krysten Ritter as Brynn, Diana's granddaughter ("The Squatter")
- Joe Morton as Martin James, an assemblyman whom Courtney challenges ("Sins of the Sister")
- Novella Nelson as a rude nurse and desk clerk ("Once Bitten")
- Keith Richards and Phil Collins as themselves (“Sticky Fingers”)

== Episodes ==
No.	Title	Directed by	Written by	Original release date	Viewers (millions)
1	"Pilot"	Terry Hughes	Bonnie Turner & Terry Turner	September 9, 2003	15.14
Mavis Rae makes room for her brother Courtney after his recent employer, Enron, suffers a small financial setback. However, her new hotel guest is in love and Mavis soon has the pleasure of meeting Rita, Courtney's white girlfriend who talks and dresses like a "sister" -- and is just too much fun for her to ignore. Meanwhile, the hotel's need for a fulltime concierge prompts Mavis to promote her reliable handyman Nasim giving him a shot at this new position.
2	"Don't Hide Your Bag"	Terry Hughes	Mike Chessler & Chris Alberghini	September 16, 2003	11.30
When the nation's security threat level is elevated to an orange alert, Nasim's paranoia carries over to Mavis, who calls the police bomb squad to blow up an abandoned designer briefcase found in the hotel lobby. But when Mavis discovers that the bag is actually Courtney's gift from Rita, she scrambles to find an inexpensive knockoff.
3	"Once Bitten"	Terry Hughes	Jerry Collins	September 23, 2003	8.77
Mavis has trouble getting seen at the emergency room after getting bitten by Rita's pet ferret.
4	"Shout TV"	Terry Hughes	Mike Larsen	September 30, 2003	8.94
Frustrated after receiving a ticket for smoking in her hotel, Mavis feels responsible when Nasim is also cited for spitting in public after she stuffs a hot pepper in his mouth. But when she urges him to contest the penalty in court, Nasim quits out of fear of being deported back to Iran. Meanwhile, Courtney loses cash in an ATM and his cool when he is put on hold while calling the customer service line.
5	"Smoke Gets in Your Eyes"	Terry Hughes	David J. Nash	October 7, 2003	7.99
While at a Devils–Rangers game, Mavis meets a blind man.
6	"The Vast Right Wing Conspiracy"	Terry Hughes	Larry Wilmore	October 14, 2003	10.56
After a chance encounter with President Bush when his motorcade stops at the Lamont Hotel, Mavis cannot mouth off to the Commander in Chief after he recognizes her and pays homage to her singing talents. But she clashes with the conservative Courtney when Bush invites her for a face-to-face meeting – and faces the Secret Service.
7	"She Ain't Heavy, She's My Partner"	Terry Hughes	David Regal	October 21, 2003	9.77
The funeral of Mavis' former bandmate in "The Ebony Blackbirds" singing trio brings a reunion with the other remaining member Florence Lamarck (Sheryl Lee Ralph). However, her stylish and scheming personality reignites the jealousy and disgust Mavis has held for her. Meanwhile, Rita is shocked to find out that Courtney was seduced by Florence.
8	"Rita Plays Poker"	Terry Hughes	Terry Turner	October 28, 2003	10.50
When Rita joins Mavis' rowdy all-girl smoker-poker night, she shows a new side of herself that offends conservative Courtney. But her refusal to quit causes a fight between the two that leaves him crestfallen on the eve of a big job interview. In order to reinvigorate her zombie-like brother before the interview, Mavis recruits Nasim in a desperate bid to reconcile the mismatched lovebirds.
9	"Sticky Fingers"	Terry Hughes	Mike Chessler & Chris Alberghini	November 11, 2003	8.04
After unwittingly ruining Nasim's favorite shirt, a slightly guilty Mavis takes him shopping for a replacement only to find herself in department store jail after mistakenly taking a belt without paying. Once word of her detention and alleged theft hits the media, Mavis' popularity skyrockets as the public feels sympathy for her. Keith Richards and Phil Collins guest star, albeit within the TV program the characters are watching.
10	"Mother's Little Helper"	Terry Hughes	Laurie Parres	November 18, 2003	9.05
Mavis is stricken with dread when her domineering, obnoxious mother Viveca (Diahann Carroll) arrives with her dad from North Carolina. But she is instead taken aback by her mother's newly found polite and charming demeanor, a result of a new prescription medication. And things change for the worse when her pills are accidentally tossed.
11	"The Fat and the Frivolous"	Terry Hughes	David Wyatt	December 9, 2003	7.78
Mavis is dragged into court when a corpulent man sues her after he checks into her hotel and crashes through the room's bed. She forces Courtney to represent her against a slick lawyer known for outwitting his opponents. Aware that the plaintiff makes a living off false lawsuits, Courtney stages a mock trial to prepare his loud-mothed sister for the real thing. But muzzling Mavis might prove impossible.
12	"American Woman"	Terry Hughes	Mike Larsen	January 6, 2004	8.78
As Nasim studies for his Citizenship Exam, Mavis is confronted with a group of elder guests (Rue McClanahan and Eli Wallach) who use a suite to smoke marijuana. The conservative Courtney urges Mavis to evict and report them to set a good example for Nasim, and tries to do so himself when she refuses.
13	"Airplane"	Terry Hughes	Kriss Turner	January 13, 2004	8.33
As the poker group plans a trip to the Bahamas, Rita is determined to help Mavis face her fear of flying by enrolling her in a flight simulator class. Meanwhile, Courtney runs the hotel in Mavis' absence, and becomes concerned about the poker trip after learning details from Nasim and Jadwiga.
14	"Is Rita Pregnant?"	Terry Hughes	Terry Turner	February 3, 2004	7.16
Mavis is shocked when Rita confides to the poker group that she believes she's pregnant. Courtney proposes to her, but she discovers she is not pregnant after taking a pregnancy test. When Rita rejects the proposal because it was only since he believed she was pregnant, the two start to rethink their relationship. Elsewhere, Nasim and Jadwiga travel to Connecticut to enter everyone into the nine-figure Powerball Jackpot.
15	"The Last Dance"	Terry Hughes	Kathy Speer & Terry Grossman	February 24, 2004	7.36
Mavis is excited when her former choreographer and occasional lover Tony (Patrick Swayze) is in town. However, her plans to continue their relationship are complicated when he reveals his newfound religious convictions that she sets out to undermine.
16	"No Sex in the City"	Terry Hughes	Nick LeRose	March 2, 2004	6.74
The poker group throws a wild bachelorette party at a trendy night club to celebrate Soo-Lin's upcoming wedding. But as the night progresses and the bar bill adds up, Soo-Lin begins having second thoughts. Meanwhile, designated driver Nasim is mistaken as Mavis' macho male escort and soon entertains offers of similar employment.
17	"What Child Is This?"	Terry Hughes	Mike Larsen	March 16, 2004	6.74
Mavis is pestered by a bratty boy staying at the hotel. But she is forced to play nice as the boy's father, a GOP functionary, offers Courtney a job with President Bush's reelection campaign.
18	"Don't Hide Love"	Terry Hughes	Alison McDonald	March 23, 2004	5.91
Mavis discovers her and Courtney's cousin Cassandra is a lesbian, and wants to marry her girlfriend in the hotel. After discovering that her one-hit wonder, "Don't Hide Love", has become a gay anthem in the years since its recording, she decides to host the wedding at the hotel. Even though the wedding will conflict with the Republican Inclusion Coalition that Courtney is hosting at the hotel on the same weekend.
19	"The Squatter"	Terry Hughes	Chris Alberghini & Mike Chessler	March 30, 2004	6.32
Mavis has had the final straw with the dementia-ridden former actress Diana (Celeste Holm), whose lifetime lease means Mavis cannot evict her without proper cause. Mavis convinces her greedy college-aged granddaughter Brynn (Krysten Ritter) to place her in assisted living so she can receive the help she needs. But she becomes guilty after visiting and finding Diana is miserable and mistreated – and finds a worse tenant in Brynn, who has moved into her grandmother's apartment and turned it into a party suite.
20	"Identity Crisis"	Terry Hughes	Maisha Closson	April 6, 2004	5.50
After her credit card is declined, Mavis discovers she has become a victim of identity theft. As Courtney and Rita pressure her to let them help organize her finances, she finds little support from the bank and fends off Rita's attempts to assist her.
21	"Strange Bedfellows"	Terry Hughes	Tim O'Donnell	April 13, 2004	7.95
A dating service matches Nasim with someone who looks and acts strikingly similar to Jadwiga, startling both her and Mavis. At first oblivious, Nasim becomes spooked as well and falls into a depression. Filling in for Rita at poker night, Jadwiga reveals upon prying from Mavis that her husband has left her. Meanwhile, Rita suspects that one of Courtney's colleagues has hired her as an advisor with ulterior motives in mind.
22	"Sins of the Sister"	Terry Hughes	Dave Boerger	April 20, 2004	5.28
Courtney is courted by the Republicans to run for the state assembly against incumbent Martin James (Joe Morton), whom Mavis supports. But after she naively tells him about Courtney's past with Enron, she finds herself in hot water with Courtney and a target of James' smear campaign against him. Meanwhile, Nasim and Jadwiga have a one-night stand after he learns that her husband left her. The aftermath leaves them both struggling on how to let the affair avoid interfering with their work.

== Production ==
The series was filmed at Kaufman Astoria Studios in Queens.

== Reception and cancellation ==
The debut episode of Whoopi drew 15.1 million viewers, and was ranked number four for the week. On October 31, NBC ordered a full 22-episode season of the series.

However, the series faltered from its initial success. The series received mixed-to-negative reviews from critics upon its premiere. Ratings in following weeks were unsteady. The latter half of the season also saw competition against the third season of American Idol, which caused ratings to collapse even further. NBC eventually cancelled the series in May 2004.
