= Jevetta Steele =

American R&B and gospel music singer (born 1963)

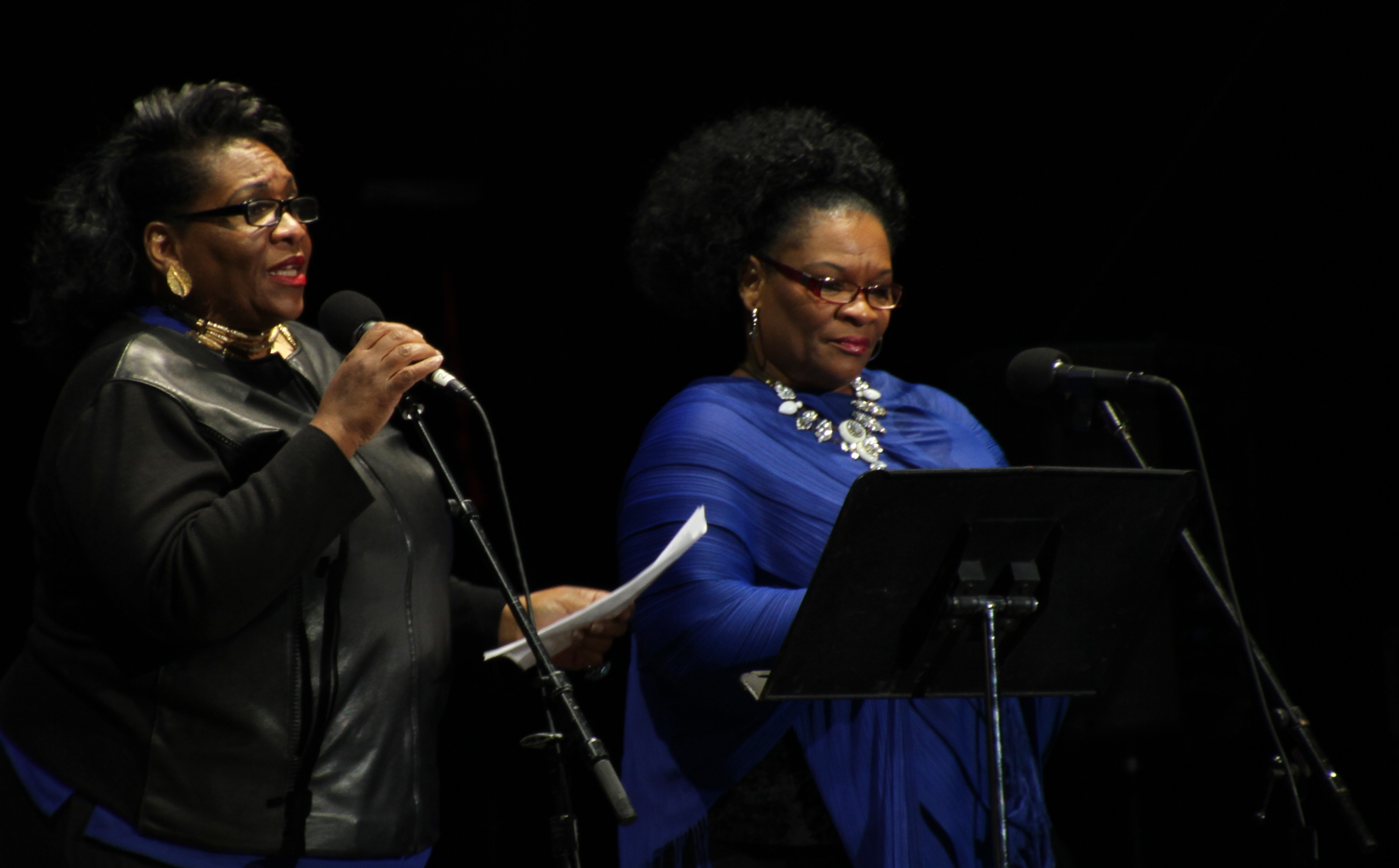
- Jevetta and Jearlyn Steele at the 2017 Minnesota State Fair

Background information
- Born: November 14, 1962 (age 63); Gary, Indiana, U.S.
- Occupations: Singer, actress, producer
- Instrument: Vocals
- Years active: 1985–present
- Formerly of: The Steeles

Jevetta Steele (born November 14, 1962) is an American R&B jazz, and gospel music singer.

== Early years ==
Born and raised in Gary, Indiana, Steele eventually moved to Minneapolis, Minnesota to become a criminal lawyer. Steele later embarked upon a solo career within music and the stage. She also went on to be a member of gospel group The Steeles along with her sister Jearlyn and her three brothers JD, Fred and Billy.

== Musical career ==
In 1983, Steele landed the lead role of Ismene in the touring show, The Gospel at Colonus. She went on to appear in productions of Smokey Joe's Cafe, Don't Bother Me, I Can't Cope, Ain't Misbehavin', Crowns, and Double Infidelities. She later composed the musical Two Queens, One Castle, which opened to critical acclaim.

Bob Telson, the composer of The Gospel at Colonus, used Jevetta Steele as a singer for different soundtracks he worked on. A collaboration with Telson has become her most well-known lead vocal performance, on the 1988 Telson-penned song "Calling You" from the movie soundtrack of Bagdad Café. The song was nominated for an Academy Award. The song was released as Steele's debut single and became a big airplay hit around Europe, as well as achieving top 10 positions in Sweden and in France, where she was especially successful. The success in France led to a recording contract there and in 1989 she released a follow-up single, again produced by Telson, titled "I Will Remember", which failed to chart.

Starting in 1988, Steele, on her own or with her singing family group The Steeles, became a very much in-demand session singer. It was through those sessions that she met Prince and his associates, and worked closely with him providing vocals on his records and the artists he produced from the period 1989–1995.

At the same time as these sessions, Steele worked on her debut album, Here It Is. Primarily recorded at Paisley Park and produced by Tommy LiPuma, Ricky Peterson and Maurice White, the album was first issued only in France during 1991 and was later reissued in 1993.

Steele's debut album reached No. 15 on the Blues & Soul UK Hiplist chart. The LP also included her hit "Calling You". The Japanese release also featured a cover of Dionne Warwick's "Say A Little Prayer For You". That same year, Steele's group The Steeles released their debut album Heaven Help Us All.

Steele can also be heard on the soundtrack of the 1994 film Corrina, Corrina singing "Over the Rainbow".

She has recorded and toured with Prince, George Clinton, 10,000 Maniacs, and Mavis Staples. She appeared on the album Memorial Beach, recorded by the Norwegian group a-ha, performing backing vocals on the songs "Lie Down in Darkness" and "Move to Memphis". Her most recent album is a 2006 collection of original and classic jazz selections called My Heart.

== Personal life ==
Steele is married, and has three children; Kenyari, Kortland and Jasmine. Her three children are all singers, musicians and entertainers. Steele is currently producing shows such as "The Sound of Gospel" and is currently performing with her family and producing behind the scenes.

== Discography ==
=== Albums ===
- 1988: Jevetta Steele
- 1993: Here It Is
- 2006: My Heart

=== Singles ===
- 1988: "Calling You"
- 1989: "I Will Remember"
- 1991: "Say A Little Prayer For You"
- 1993: "Hold Me
- 1999: "Calling You" (remix) (with Christian Falk)
