= Bonnie Pemberton =

American writer

Bonnie Pemberton is an American author, playwright, actress and animal activist.

She invented the cat anti-scratch deterrent, Sticky Paws® for Furniture to prevent declawing, and her company, Fe-Lines, Inc, (1996–2012), donated thousands of dollars to animal charities through The Buddy Fund.

Her trilogy of one act plays, Thanks For Sharing That, was produced by the Blue Line Theater Company in Los Angeles.

Film and television credits include Crisis At Central High (1981) and Rosalie Goes Shopping (1989), Celebrity, Terms of Endearment, Dear John and over one hundred television and radio commercials.

As an author, her fantasy fiction novels include The Cat Master and its sequel, The Lizard Returns. The novels address the issues of feral cat colonies, pet abandonment, and the illegal animal trade through the eyes of animals.

Ms. Pemberton is married and lives in Texas.

== Works ==
- The Cat Master (Marshall Cavendish, 2007) ISBN 0-7614-5340-7. Reviews range from 'I read a lot of good books but the great ones shine like gems among them...' to 'A stunning cover is the best part of this mediocre animal fantasy. ... Those desperate for another cat story may find this more entertaining than reading the back of a pet-food bag—barely.'
- The Lizard Returns (Amazon Books, 2013) ISBN 148002323X, ISBN 978-1480023239.

== Awards ==
- 2007 - The Cat Writers' Association Communications Contest - Certificate of Excellence (winner)

== Book reviews ==
- Felinexpress.com
- A Year of Reading
- Powell’s Books: Staff Pick
- St. Charles Public Library
