= Eat Your Heart Out (film) =

- German theatrical release poster
- Directed by: Felix Adlon
- Written by: Felix Adlon; Laura Slakey
- Produced by: Percy Adlon; Eleonore Adlon; Felix Adlon
- Starring: Christian Oliver; Pamela Adlon
- Cinematography: Judy Irola
- Edited by: Dan Lebental
- Music by: Alex Wurman
- Production companies: Pelemele Film; Leora Films
- Distributed by: Touchstone Pictures (through Buena Vista International; Germany)
- Release date: 6 April 2000 (Germany)
- Running time: 90 minutes
- Countries: Germany; United States
- Language: English

Eat Your Heart Out, (released in Germany as American Shrimps) is a 1997 romantic comedy film directed by Felix Adlon, who also produced it with his parents. It starred Pamela Adlon, his then wife.

Filming took place in Los Angeles, with much of it shot at a loft in Venice Beach. Jackie Guerra says she was recommended for her role by Pamela Adlon.

The film premiered at Filmfest Munchen in 1997.

== Premise ==
The lives of three housemates, Daniel, Sam and Peter, is affected when Daniel becomes a successful television chef.

== Cast ==
- Christian Oliver as Daniel Haus
- Pamela Adlon as Samantha
- Laura San Giacomo as Jacqueline Fosburg
- John Craig as Peter
- Jackie Guerra as Julie
- Tod Thawley as Jamie
- Shawnee Smith as Nicole
- Richard Fancy as Mr. Haus
- Christopher Kirby as Bobo
- Leslie Jordan as Director
- Phil LaMarr as Stage Manager
- Linda Hunt as Kathryn
- John Billingsley as Technician
- J.J. Boone as Phone Operator
