= Baby Cakes (film) =

1989 American television film

- DVD cover
- Based on: Sugarbaby by Percy Adlon
- Teleplay by: Joyce Eliason
- Directed by: Paul Schneider
- Starring: Ricki Lake; Craig Sheffer; Nada Despotovich; John Karlen; Betty Buckley; Cynthia Dale
- Music by: William Olvis
- Country of origin: United States
- Original language: English

Production
- Executive producers: Frank Konigsberg; Larry Sanitsky
- Producer: Diana Kerew
- Cinematography: Tony Imi
- Editor: Ron Binkowski
- Running time: 100 minutes
- Production company: The Konigsberg/Sanitsky Company

Original release
- Network: CBS
- Release: February 14, 1989

Babycakes is a 1989 American romantic comedy-drama television film directed by Paul Schneider, written by Joyce Eliason, and starring Ricki Lake and Craig Sheffer. It is a remake of the 1985 German film Sugarbaby and aired on CBS on Valentine's Day, February 14, 1989.

The film inspired the 2004 song of the same name by the UK Garage act 3 of a Kind.

== Plot ==
Mortuary cosmetician Grace Hart lives in Queens and rides the subway every day. Her somewhat unhappy existence is noted as she shops in a department store with her best friend, Keri, a socially awkward and mousy coworker, when she is rudely asked to look at their "Large Ladies Department". That same night, she and Keri are at a local skating rink when a young, attractive, amateur ice skater, Rob, catches Grace's eye; she claims that he is the most beautiful man she has ever laid eyes on.

The following morning, Grace is wrapping a wedding present (a painted portrait of Grace and her father) for her butcher father, Al's supermarket wedding. Grace's new stepmother, a cashier at the same supermarket named Wanda, claims to care, but her sweet-talking attitude somehow always ends up insulting Grace in a passive aggressive sort of way instead of helping. When Grace is caught overindulging at the wedding, Wanda and Al express their concerns, to which she tells them she knows what they're going to say that she's got a pretty face, but she needs to lose weight. After sending Al to get her a drink, Wanda tells Grace that she'll never find a boyfriend if she doesn't lose weight. To shut Wanda up, Grace lies and states that she already has a boyfriend. A surprised Wanda says that she and Al would love to meet him.

On her way home, Grace is riding the subway when she notices that Rob is a New York City Subway motorman. After following him around town a bit, she discovers that he is in a relationship with a woman named Olivia. Grace observes the relationship as being rocky, with Olivia behaving in a very overbearing manner toward the non-confrontational Rob. She decides to win Rob over, and eventually manages a meeting with him, after his girlfriend leaves town to visit her family for the Christmas holidays. This meeting blossoms into a full-fledged romance, one that is lamented by Grace's overly pessimistic best friend Keri. After Rob leaves for a New Year's party with Grace, Olivia arrives home to an empty house. She asks around at the ice rink where Rob likes to practice skating, where Keri reveals his secret relationship, along with their location that evening. Olivia, in a fit of rage, confronts Rob and Grace at the club where he is partying, beats Grace to the ground, and calls her cruel names like "fat", "cheap trash".

Grace goes back to being depressed and lonely; her father finally takes notice and tells her the truth about how her mother died - by suicide. He was mainly worried about Grace because she looks a lot like her mother did when alive; also, her mother struggled with her own weight, as Grace does. Feeling that the struggle was what led to the depression, and the eventual suicide, of Grace's mother, he was worried that Grace would end up the same way. Grace later decides to quit being afraid of what the world thinks of her and to follow her own dreams. She applies to beauty school to become a full-fledged beautician and hairstylist.

The story concludes with Rob realizing that Olivia refuses to accept him as he is and that he truly loves Grace.

== Cast ==
- Ricki Lake as Grace
- Craig Sheffer as Rob Harrison / Wayne
- Nada Despotovich as Keri
- John Karlen as Al
- Betty Buckley as Wanda
- Cynthia Dale as Olivia
