= Nouvelle Star season 5 =

Nouvelle Star
- Season 5
- Hosted by: Virginie Efira
- Judges: André Manoukian, Dove Attia, Marianne James, Manu Katché
- Winner: Julien Doré
- Runner-up: Tigane Drammeh

Release
- Original release: February 28 – June 13, 2007

Season chronology
- ← Previous; Season 4 Next → Season 6

The fifth season of Nouvelle Star began on February 28, 2007. Once again all four judges returned and Virginie Efira was hosting her second season. Auditions were held in the following cities:

Rennes
Marseille
Lyon
Bordeaux
Lille
Paris

The winner of the season was Julien Doré over Tigane Drammeh.

== Contestants ==
Top 10 Finalists

Date	Theme	Bottom Three
18 April	Rock'n'Roll	Ilyès Yangui	Julie Mazi	Canelle
25 April	French Hits	Canelle (2)	Soma	Gaëtane Abrial
2 May	Idols and Legends	Alex	Raphaëlle Dess	Julie Mazi (2)
9 May	Viewer's Choice	Soma (2)	Gaëtane Abrial (2)	Tigane
17 May	Big Band	Raphaëlle Dess (2)	Julie Mazi (3)	Gaëtane Abrial (3)
24 May	Love Songs	Pierre Darmon	Gaëtane Abrial (4)
Date	Theme	Bottom Two
31 May	Acoustic	Julie Mazi (4)	Tigane (3)
7 June	Free Choice	Gaëtane Abrial (5)
13 June	Grand Final	Tigane (4)	Julien Doré

== Elimination chart ==
Legend
Female	Male	Top 10	Top 15

Stage:		Semifinals		Finals								
Week:		4/4	4/11	4/18	4/25	5/2	5/9	5/17	5/24	5/31	6/7	6/13
Place	Contestant	Result										
1	Julien Doré		Viewers									Winner
2	Tigane Drammeh		Viewers				Btm 3			Btm 3	Btm 2	Runner-up
3	Gaëtane Abrial		Viewers		Btm 3		Btm 2		Btm 2		Elim	
4	Julie Mazi		Viewers	Btm 2		Btm 3		Btm 2		Elim		
5	Pierre Darmon		Viewers						Elim			
6	Raphaëlle Dess		Viewers			Btm 2		Elim				
7	Soma Dufour	Btm 3	Viewers		Btm 2		Elim					
8	Alex Fondja		Judges			Elim						
9	Canelle Zahy		Viewers	Btm 3	Elim							
10	Ilyès Yangui		Viewers	Elim								
11-13	Martine		Elim									
11-13	Michel Colyn		Elim									
11-13	Vincent Galahad		Elim									
14-15	Isabelle Ithurburu	Elim										
14-15	Mounic Ouarab	Elim										
