= Younger and Younger =

- Directed by: Percy Adlon
- Written by: Percy Adlon; Felix Adlon
- Produced by: Eleonore Adlon; Percy Adlon
- Starring: Donald Sutherland; Brendan Fraser; Lolita Davidovich
- Cinematography: Bernd Heinl
- Edited by: Suzanne Fenn
- Music by: Hans Zimmer; Michael Glenn Williams
- Distributed by: Transmundo Films (Argentina)
- Release date: 1993
- Running time: 99 minutes
- Countries: United States; Germany
- Language: English

Younger and Younger is a 1993 American comedy film co-written and directed by Percy Adlon and starring Donald Sutherland, Brendan Fraser and Lolita Davidovich.

== Synopsis ==
Jonathan Younger owns a self-storage facility and runs it with his wife Penny, with whom he has a strained relationship. One day Penny, a plain and skittish woman, is startled by a great deal of noise Jonathan makes with an organ and dies from a heart attack.

Jonathan's college-aged son Winston returns home for the funeral and to help run the family business. While they interact with a number of quirky customers, Jonathan is haunted by the spirit of his late wife, who becomes increasingly attractive to him with each ghostly apparition.

== Cast ==
- Donald Sutherland as Jonathan Younger
- Brendan Fraser as Winston Younger
- Lolita Davidovich as Penny
- Sally Kellerman as ZigZag Lilian
- Julie Delpy as Melodie
- Linda Hunt as Frances
- Pit Krüger as Roger
- Nicholas Gunn as Benjamin

== Reception ==
The summary of Leonard Klady's favorable Variety review reads "The iconoclastic oeuvre of Percy Adlon provides another unusual human comedy in "Younger and Younger." Superficially a family drama of an errant, philandering father, the yarn spins out from its simple premise into fantasy, music, black comedy and innumerable offbeat digressions. It’s a mad, wild souffle served up by actors at the top of their form." Writing for Entertainment Weekly, Melissa Pierson differs: "When a film stuffed with this much talent goes straight to video, you might suspect something. And you’d be largely right. C− ."

== Awards and nominations ==
Brussels International Fantastic Film Festival

- Won, "Silver Raven Award" - Percy Adlon

Tokyo International Film Festival

- Won, "Best Actress Award" - Lolita Davidovich
