= Obba Babatundé =

American actor (born 1951)

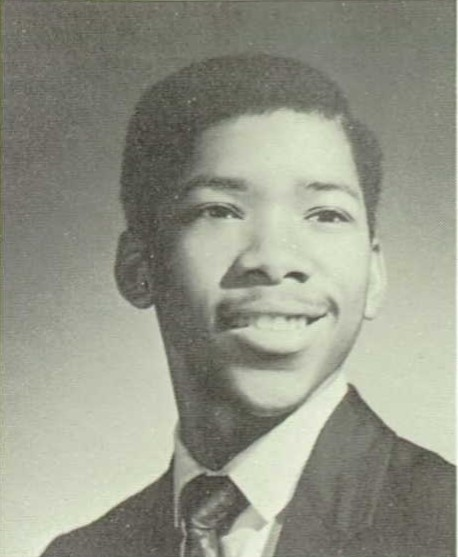
- Babatundé in 1969
- Born: Donald Cohen; December 1, 1951 (age 74); New York City, U.S.
- Occupation: Actor
- Years active: 1969–present

Obba Babatundé ( born Donald Cohen; December 1, 1951) is an American actor. A native of Queens, New York City, he has appeared in more than seventeen stage productions, thirty theatrical films, sixty made-for-television films, and two prime-time series.

== Early life and education ==
Donald Cohen was born in Jamaica, Queens, New York City. As a child, he attended public schools. He was attracted early to theater and from a young age would sing, dance and act for his family. He attended Jamaica High School, where he was a well-rounded student. In addition to appearing in the Sing '68 school musical program, Cohen was a student aide and a member of both the track and cross country teams. After graduating from Jamaica High School in 1969, he started teaching at a private school for students of color. He also pursued acting jobs in New York, gaining some roles Off-Off-Broadway.

Learning that his ancestry included people from Nigeria, Cohen adopted a name made of Yoruba words: Obba, meaning "king", and Babatundé, meaning "father has returned again".

== Acting career ==
Babatundé has said a breakthrough role was gaining a part in a 1976 touring company of Guys and Dolls, starring Leslie Uggams and Richard Roundtree. Since then he has performed in many other stage productions.

His first Broadway performance was in Timbuktu! in 1978. He performed with Liza Minnelli in the documentary film “Liza In New Orleans” in 1980. He is known for starring as the original C.C. White in Dreamgirls, for which he was nominated for a 1982 Tony Award as Best Featured Actor in a Musical. After performing on Broadway in this role, he also toured for two years with the company. He gradually moved into film and television work, and has had numerous roles in both genres.

=== Film ===
His feature film appearances include Life as Willie, The Celestine Prophecy, Material Girls, After the Sunset, The Manchurian Candidate, The Notebook, a SWAT captain in John Q, an attorney in Philadelphia (1993), The Last Fall, If I Tell You I Have to Kill You, The Fallen Faithful, Trapped, Tension, and Kinky.

He also played Dean Cain in the film How High, as well as the role of Willie Long in Life, Lamar in That Thing You Do!, and Mayor Denny in Santa Paws 2: The Santa Pups.

=== Television ===
Babatundé has appeared in several prime-time series, including CBS' Madam Secretary, as Barton Royce in the Showtime's I'm Dying Up Here (2017), and as Dean Fairbanks in Netflix's Dear White People (2017–2018).

Babatundé appeared in a recurring role on Kingdom and Amazon's Hand of God, as Bishop Bruce Congdon. He also appeared in Half & Half, as well as appearances on The Bold and the Beautiful, Boston Legal, Grey's Anatomy, NCIS, Cold Case, Strong Medicine, The Fresh Prince of Bel-Air, Touched by an Angel, Chicago Hope, Any Day Now, Karen Sisco, Dawson's Creek, and Friends. In the 1998 miniseries, The Temptations, he played Berry Gordy, the founder of Motown Records.

Babatundé appeared as Daniel Harrelson Sr., the father of Shemar Moore's character in the 2017 series S.W.A.T..

== Other ventures ==
=== Voice acting ===
Babatundé's voice acting roles in animated films and games include Lando Calrissian in Star Wars: Galactic Battlegrounds, Star Wars: Rogue Squadron II: Rogue Leader, Star Wars: Rogue Squadron III: Rebel Strike, and Disney Infinity 3.0 as well as Conroy in Rocket Power. In the animated feature The Wild Thornberrys Movie, Babatundé voiced the character of Boko, and in the 2016 Air Bud Entertainment film Pup Star, he played the soul-singing Basset Hound, Big Ears.

=== Producer and director ===
Babatundé was co-producer and director of Oscar's Black Odyssey, co-producer of Dorothy Dandridge: An American Beauty, and co-producer of TV in Black: The First 50 Years. He is associate producer of the horror film Voodoo Dolls and executive producer of Journey. Most recently, Babatundé directed and co-stars with Katt Williams in the Lionsgate Home Entertainment feature film American Bad Boy, and he produced and directed the short film Clarissa's Gift.

Babatundé also directed a version of the Broadway musical Dreamgirls. He co-authored, directed, and produced In the Blink of an Eye.

=== Singing ===
Some of his recorded works include singing the title track on the Onaje Allan Gumbs's album Sack Full of Dreams, and "The Gal That Got Away" on Over The Rainbow, the Harold Arlen soundtrack.

In 1982, Babatundé starred as Zodzetrick in the Houston Grand Opera's second production of Scott Joplin's opera Treemonisha. They had produced it first in 1976. After the opera was rediscovered, the world premiere was produced in 1972 by the Atlanta Symphony Orchestra and Morehouse College chorus.

== Awards and nominations ==
In 1981, Babatundé was nominated for an Ovation Award and a Tony Award for his role as C.C. White in the original Broadway cast of Dreamgirls.

Babatundé was nominated for an Emmy for the 1997 HBO film Miss Evers' Boys and an NAACP Image Award for the 1999 HBO film Introducing Dorothy Dandridge. In 2010, Babatundé won NAACP Theatre Awards' "Best Lead Male" for his portrayal of Sammy Davis Jr. in the Old Globe production of the musical Sammy.

In 2011, he won an NAACP Image Award as "Best Actor" for his role as Sarge in A Soldiers Play.

In 2019, Babatundé was inducted into the National Multicultural Western Heritage Museum. In 2016, he received the Daytime Emmy Award for "Outstanding Guest Performer in a Drama Series" for his role as Julius Avant in the soap opera The Bold and the Beautiful. He received the Lifetime Achievement Award from the Peachtree Village International Film Festival

== Filmography ==
=== Film ===
| Year | Title | Role | Notes |
|---|---|---|---|
| 1987 | Leonard Part 6 | Bongo Drummer | |
| 1988 | God Bless the Child | Raymond Watkins | Television film |
| 1988 | Married to the Mob | The Face of Justice | |
| 1989 | Heart and Soul | Also Taylor | Television film |
| 1990 | Miami Blues | Blink Willie the Informant | |
| 1991 | The Silence of the Lambs | TV Anchorman | |
| 1991 | Dead Again | Syd | |
| 1992 | The Importance of Being Earnest | Lane | |
| 1993 | Undercover Blues | Lt. Sawyer | |
| 1993 | Necronomicon | Paul (Part 3) | |
| 1993 | Philadelphia | Jerome Green | |
| 1994 | M.A.N.T.I.S. | Cornell | Television film |
| 1995 | Born to Be Wild | Interpreter | |
| 1995 | The Net | F.B.I. Agent | |
| 1995 | A Reason to Believe | Professor Thurman | |
| 1995 | Fatal Pursuit | Trinidad | |
| 1996 | That Thing You Do! | Lamarr | |
| 1996 | Soul of the Game | Cum Posey | Television film |
| 1996 | Multiplicity | Paul | |
| 1996 | Carpool | Jeffery | |
| 1996 | The Tomorrow Man | Brian Parish | Television film |
| 1996 | The Cherokee Kid | Isom Dart | Television film |
| 1997 | Miss Evers' Boys | Willie Johnson | Television film |
| 1999 | Life | Willie Long | |
| 1999 | Introducing Dorothy Dandridge | Harold Nicholas | Television film |
| 1999 | The Apartment Complex | Chett | Television film |
| 2000 | The Visit | Tony | |
| 2001 | How High | Dean Carl Cain | |
| 2002 | John Q | Sergeant Moody | |
| 2002 | Redeemer | Charles Henderson | Television film |
| 2002 | The Wild Thornberrys Movie | Boko | Voice |
| 2003 | The Great Commission | Reverend Jesse | |
| 2004 | The Notebook | Band Leader | |
| 2004 | The Manchurian Candidate | Senator Wells | |
| 2004 | After the Sunset | Zacharias | |
| 2004 | Kangaroo Jack: G'Day U.S.A.! | Chief Ankamuti | Voice, direct-to-video |
| 2004 | Joy Road | Dr. Howard Perkins | |
| 2005 | Flip the Script | Mr. Jones | |
| 2006 | The Celestine Prophecy | Miguel | |
| 2006 | Material Girls | Craig | |
| 2007 | April Fools | Detective Combs | Video |
| 2007 | Cover | Attorney Miller | |
| 2008 | The Eye | Dr. Haskins | |
| 2009 | Black Dynamite | Osiris | |
| 2009 | Why Am I Doing This? | Cliff | |
| 2009 | I Do... I Did | Mr. Johnson | |
| 2010 | Trapped: Haitian Nights | Ikliff | |
| 2010 | The Fallen Faithful | Reverend Emmanuel | |
| 2011 | All-Star Superman | Judge | Voice, direct-to-video |
| 2011 | Go Beyond the Lens | Host | Short |
| 2011 | The Trap Door | Mesmer | Video |
| 2012 | Scooby-Doo! Music of the Vampire | Vampire Actor #4 | Voice, direct-to-video |
| 2012 | The Last Fall | Larry Armstrong | |
| 2012 | Santa Paws 2: The Santa Pups | Mayor Denny | |
| 2013 | Dolls of Voodoo | Iklif | |
| 2014 | The Dead Sea | Mayor | |
| 2014 | Lap Dance | Roscoe | |
| 2015 | American Bad Boy | Pastor Lovely | |
| 2015 | Death's Door | Mesmer | |
| 2015 | If I Tell You I Have to Kill You | Jonathan Black | |
| 2016 | Pup Star | Big Ears | Voice, direct-to-video |
| 2016 | The Watcher | Stark | |
| 2017 | Pup Star 2: Better Together | Big Ears | Voice |
| 2017 | 'Til Death Do Us Part | John Harris | |
| 2017 | D.P.W. | Mayor McCann | Television film |
| 2018 | The Choir Director | Mr. Wilcox | |
| 2018 | Tennis, the Good Boy | Armon | Voice, short |
| 2018 | Kinky | Mr. Bernard | |
| 2018 | Jingle Belle | Charles Williams | Television film |
| 2018 | Revival | Nicodemus | |
| 2018 | City of Lies | Police Chief | |
| 2019 | Mather | Mather | Short |
| 2020 | Trigger | Chief Keaton | |
| 2020 | The Millennial | Mr. Burke | |
| 2020 | Kiss Me for Christmas | Mr. Porter | Television film |
| 2021 | I Heart LA | Captain Ross | Short |
| 2021 | Little Vagabond | Walter | Short |
| 2022 | A Polished Soul | Solomon | |
| 2022 | The Millennial | Mr. Burke | |
| 2022 | All the Men in My Life | Simon Helms | |
| 2022 | Fuhgedd About It | Captain Ross | |
| 2022 | Noble Intentions | Pastor Stevens | |
| 2023 | 45 Seconds | Lt. Reginald Morrow | |
| 2024 | Mississippi Scholar | Reginald | |
| 2025 | Wrong Place, Wrong Time | Captain Green | |
| 2025 | Run | President | |

=== Television ===
| Year | Title | Role | Notes |
|---|---|---|---|
| 1986 | America's Musical Theater | Zodzetrick | Episode: "Treemonisha" |
| 1987 | All My Children | Rusty Bennett | Episode: "Episode #1.46002" |
| 1988 | Matlock | Backstage Man | Episode: "The Magician" |
| 1988 | CBS Summer Playhouse | Terrence Quimby | Episode: "Fort Figueroa" |
| 1990 | A Different World | Frank Benning | Episode: "Soldier Boy" |
| 1992 | The Human Factor | Silky Wells | 2 episodes |
| 1992 | Tales from the Crypt | Lieutenant Jamison | Episode: "Maniac at Large" |
| 1992 | Sisters | Ben | Episode: "Crash and Born" |
| 1993 | The Adventures of Brisco County, Jr. | Mongoose | Episode: "A.K.A. Kansas" |
| 1994 | Getting By | | Episode: "The Rich Guy" |
| 1994 | Hangin' with Mr. Cooper | Jameson Walker | Episode: "Trading Places" |
| 1994 | Tom | Tanner | Episode: "Pilot" |
| 1994 | Thunder in Paradise | Carl | Episode: "Identity Crisis" |
| 1994 | The Fresh Prince of Bel-Air | Gordy Berry | 2 episodes |
| 1994 | Touched by an Angel | Carter Evans | Episode: "Fallen Angela" |
| 1995 | Under One Roof | Ben | Episode: "Pilot" |
| 1995 | Sliders | Cézanne Brown | Episode: "Summer of Love" |
| 1995 | Chicago Hope | Charles Ellis | 2 episodes |
| 1997 | Friends | The Director | Episode: "The One with All the Jealousy" |
| 1997 | The Burning Zone | Vince, Police Lieutenant | Episode: "The Last Endless Summer" |
| 1997 | Sparks | Mr. Kirby | Episode: "A Day in the Life II" |
| 1997 | Spy Game | Lieutenant Wardell | Episode: "Lorne and Max Drop the Bell" |
| 1998 | The Temptations | Berry Gordy | Miniseries |
| 1999 | Xyber 9: New Dawn | Additional voices | |
| 1999 | Linc's | Army Vet | Episode: "Dog Day Afternoon" |
| 1999–2000 | Dawson's Creek | Principal Howard Green | Recurring cast: season 3 |
| 1999–2004 | Rocket Power | Conroy Blanc, additional voices | Recurring cast |
| 2000 | The Outer Limits | Dr. Joseph Lennox | Episode: "The Beholder" |
| 2000 | The Invisible Man | Allardyce | Episode: "The Value of Secrets" |
| 2000 | Cover Me | Sergeant Bonner | Episode: "Bazooka Joe" |
| 2000 | Max Steel | Additional voices | 2 episodes |
| 2001 | Any Day Now | Judge Richards | Episode: "It's Not Just a Word: Parts 1 & 2" |
| 2001 | Family Law | Philip Hamilton | Episode: "Planting Seeds" |
| 2001 | The Beast | Mr. Lowry | Episode: "The Price" |
| 2001–02 | Soul Food | Benjamin Chadway | 2 episodes |
| 2001–03 | Static Shock | Watch Store Salesman, Scientist | Voice, 2 episodes |
| 2002 | NYPD Blue | Kevin Dupree | Episode: "Maya Con Dios" |
| 2002–06 | Half & Half | Charles Thorne | Recurring cast |
| 2003–04 | Karen Sisco | Daniel Burden | Recurring cast |
| 2004 | Soap Talk | Himself | |
| 2005 | Everwood | Jason | Episode: "Giving Up the Girl" |
| 2007 | Cold Case | Dr. Octavius Leroy | Episode: "Shuffle, Ball Change" |
| 2007 | The Young and the Restless | Carter Campbell | Regular cast |
| 2007 | Boston Legal | Dr. Stanley Rivers / Dr. Victor Rivers | 2 episodes |
| 2007 | Girlfriends | Attendant | Episode: "Save the Last Dance" |
| 2008 | Psych | David Gaffney | Episode: "There's Something About Mira" |
| 2008 | Saving Grace | Doc | Episode: "Do You Love Him?" |
| 2009 | NCIS | Joe Banks | Episode: "Knockout" |
| 2009 | Grey's Anatomy | Dan Gates | Episode: "Sweet Surrender" |
| 2010 | Criminal Minds | Sheriff Sanders | Episode: "Solitary Man" |
| 2011 | Private Practice | Dr. Larry Cannon | Episode: "Heaven Can Wait" |
| 2011 | Love That Girl! | Jim | Episode: "Happy Birthday, Bro" |
| 2011 | Winx Club: Enchantix | King Teredor | Voice, episode: "The Wizard's Challenge" |
| 2011–13 | Winx Club | King Teredor | Voice, recurring cast: season 3–5 |
| 2013 | Cult | Quentin Farrow | 2 episodes |
| 2014 | Enlisted | General Murray | Episode: "The General Inspection" |
| 2014 | Kingdom | Detective Gaines | Recurring cast: season 1 |
| 2015 | Hand of God | Bishop Bruce Congdon | Recurring cast: season 1 |
| 2015–20 | The Bold and the Beautiful | Julius Avant | Main role |
| 2017 | Madam Secretary | President Silvanus Fabre | Episode: "The Detour" |
| 2017 | The Last Tycoon | Les Turpin | Episode: "Oscar, Oscar, Oscar" |
| 2017 | I'm Dying Up Here | Barton Royce | Recurring cast: season 1 |
| 2017–18 | Detroiters | Mr. Duvet | Guest: season 1, recurring cast: season 2 |
| 2017–21 | Dear White People | Dean Fairbanks | Recurring cast |
| 2018 | The Good Fight | Danny Quinn | Episode: "Day 492" |
| 2018 | Forever | Gregory | Recurring cast |
| 2018 | Ballers | J.D. Pritchard | Episode: "The Kids Are Alright" |
| 2018–25 | S.W.A.T. | Daniel Harrelson Sr. | Recurring cast |
| 2019 | Corporate | Cronker Wilson | Recurring cast: season 2 |
| 2019 | For the People | Philip Kaws | Episode: "You Belong Here" |
| 2020 | Little Fires Everywhere | George Wright | Miniseries |
| 2021 | Chicago Med | James Coleman | Episode: "When Your Heart Rules Your Head" |
| 2021 | Bronzeville | Harry Davis | Recurring cast |
| 2021 | Goliath | Ivan Tillinger | Recurring cast: season 4 |

=== Video games ===
| Year | Title | Role | Notes |
|---|---|---|---|
| 2001 | Star Wars: Galactic Battlegrounds | Lando Calrissian | Credited as Obba Baba Tunde |
| 2001 | Star Wars: Rogue Squadron II – Rogue Leader | Lando Calrissian | |
| 2002 | Rocket Power: Beach Bandits | Conroy Le Blanc, Easter Island Head | |
| 2002 | The Wild Thornberrys Movie | Boko | |
| 2003 | Star Wars: Rogue Squadron III: Rebel Strike | Lando Calrissian | |
| 2006 | Tom Clancy's Splinter Cell: Double Agent | Additional voices | |
| 2012 | Kinect Star Wars | Lando Calrissian | Credited as Obba Babatunde |
| 2015 | Disney Infinity 3.0 | Lando Calrissian | |

== Personal life ==
He is the grandfather of NFL running back Tarik Cohen.
