= Calling You =

1987 single by Jevetta Steele

Single by Jevetta Steele

from the album Bagdad Cafe soundtrack
- B-side: "Calling You" (Bob Telson version)
- Released: 1988
- Recorded: 1987
- Length: 5:20
- Label: Island
- Songwriter: Bob Telson
- Producer: Bob Telson

Jevetta Steele singles chronology
"Calling You" (1988)	"I Say a Little Prayer" (1992)

"Calling You" is a song written by Bob Telson for the 1987 film Bagdad Cafe, in which it serves as the central musical theme. First recorded by American R&B and gospel music singer Jevetta Steele, the track appears prominently throughout the film and on its accompanying soundtrack. Steele's interpretation drew widespread critical praise for its sparse arrangement and emotive vocal delivery, helping the song become a top-10 hit in France and Sweden. Telson also recorded his own version for the soundtrack. "Calling You" went on to receive a nomination for the Academy Award for Best Original Song at the 61st Academy Awards, and has since been covered by numerous artists, including Celine Dion, who released a live rendition as a single in 1994.

== Jevetta Steele version ==
=== Critical reception ===
Film critic Julie Salamon from the Wall Street Journal wrote, "The mood, dreamy and yearning, takes hold at the outset, as the terrific gospel singer Jevetta Steele sings Bob Telson's 'Calling You'. This theme song is hypnotic; days later you'll find it turning itself on in your head." Upon the 1993 re-release, Larry Flick from Billboard stated, "This overlooked nugget from the soundtrack to Bagdad Cafe is poised for long overdue success, thanks to its exposure in an AT&T television commercial. Steele's haunting, beautiful vocal rests comfortably atop a spare keyboard and harmonica arrangement. Don't let this one slip by a second time".

Jerry Smith from Music Week described it as a "startlingly simple, but highly effective ballad", distinguished by Steele's "hauntingly soulful vocals. Could well be an offbeat hit if given the deserved exposure." Mixmaster Morris from NME wrote, "Jevetta has a beautiful voice that haunts the heart with a moving and yet feminine piano accompaniment." Jim Delmont from the Omaha World-Herald called it "a strangely fascinating theme song". Parry Gettelman from the Orlando Sentinel wrote, "Levi Seacer's production is syrupy, but Steele sings the eerily simple melody with extraordinary strength and elegance." Joe Brown from The Washington Post described it as "haunting", sung by the "incomparable" Steele. He added, "Okay, you can compare her to Whitney Houston - but Steele wins".

=== Formats and track listing ===
- European single
1. "Calling You" (Jevetta Steele) – 5:20
2. "Calling You" (Bob Telson) – 5:18
- French single
1. "Calling You" (Jevetta Steele) – 5:21
2. "Brenda, Brenda" (Jearlyn Steele-Battle, Tommy Joe White, Marianne Sägebrecht) – 6:22
- UK single
1. "Calling You" (Jevetta Steele) – 3:36
2. "Zweifach" (Deininger Blasmusik) – 2:31
- European maxi-single
1. "Calling You" (Jevetta Steele) – 3:36
2. "Zweifach" (Deininger Blasmusik) – 2:31
3. "Calling You" (Bob Telson) – 5:18

=== Charts ===
==== Weekly charts ====
Chart (1988–1989)	Peak position
France (SNEP)	8
Italy Airplay (Music & Media)	12
Sweden (Sverigetopplistan)	9

== Celine Dion version ==
"Calling You"

Single by Celine Dion

from the album À l'Olympia
- B-side: "Le fils de Superman" (live)
- Released: December 1994
- Recorded: September 1994
- Venue: Olympia (Paris)
- Genre: Pop
- Length: 4:04
- Label: Columbia
- Songwriter: Bob Telson
- Producer: Claude Lemay

Celine Dion singles chronology
"Only One Road" (1994)	"Calling You" (1994)	"Pour que tu m'aimes encore" (1995)

Audio video
- "Calling You" on YouTube

Canadian singer Celine Dion performed "Calling You" regularly during her concerts between 1990 and 1996. The 1994 rendition recorded at the Olympia in Paris was included on the live album À l'Olympia and issued as the album's only single in December 1994.

=== Background and release ===
Dion included "Calling You" in several tours during the early 1990s: the Unison Tour, Celine Dion in Concert, The Colour of My Love Tour, and the D'eux Tour. She also performed it on various television programmes.

The 1991 performance at the Winter Garden Theatre appeared on the Unison home video. The 1994 Olympia performance was included on À l'Olympia, and the 1995 rendition at the Zénith de Paris was released on the Live à Paris DVD. The version from À l'Olympia was also issued as a B-side on Dion's 1995 singles "Only One Road" and "Pour que tu m'aimes encore".

"Calling You" was released as a single in France in December 1994. It entered the French Top 100 Singles Chart in the final week of 1994, peaking at number 75, and remained on the chart for five weeks. Jose F. Promis from AllMusic described Dion's interpretation as distinctive and praised her voice as a "technical marvel".

In 2006, Dion's version accompanied an Emmy Award-winning routine choreographed by Mia Michaels for the American edition of So You Think You Can Dance.

The song was originally intended for inclusion on Dion's 1992 album Celine Dion, but it was replaced by "With This Tear", written by Prince.

=== Formats and track listing ===
- French 7-inch, 12-inch, and CD single
1. "Calling You" (live) – 4:04
2. "Le fils de Superman" (live) – 4:28

=== Charts ===
Chart performance
Chart (1994)	Peak position
France (SNEP)	75

=== Release history ===
Release history
Region	Date	Format	Label	Ref.
France	December 1994	7-inch; 12-inch; CD	Columbia	
