= The Importance of Being Earnest (1992 film) =

- Directed by: Kurt Baker
- Screenplay by: Peter Anthony Andrews; Kurt Baker
- Based on: The Importance of Being Earnest; 1895 play by Oscar Wilde
- Produced by: Nancy Carter Crow
- Starring: Obba Babatundé; Daryl Roach; Wren T. Brown; Chris Calloway; Lanei Chapman; Ann Weldon
- Cinematography: Joseph W. Calloway
- Edited by: Tracy Alexander
- Music by: Roger Hamilton Spotts
- Production companies: Electric Concepts; Paco Global
- Distributed by: Flair Films
- Release date: May 14, 1992
- Running time: 126 minutes
- Country: United States of America
- Language: English

The Importance of Being Earnest is a 1992 American film adaptation of the 1895 play of the same name by Oscar Wilde, featuring an all-black cast.

Director Kurt Baker co-wrote the screenplay with Peter Anthony Andrews, retaining most of Wilde’s dialogue and the setting around London, but moving it to the (then) present day rather than the original’s late Victorian period. The film was produced by Nancy Carter Crow, who is also married to the director, and shot completely within the couple’s home in Brentwood, Los Angeles. It premiered in October 1991 at a Harvard University film symposium, "Blacks in Black & White and Color", and opened theatrically on May 14, 1992, at the Anthology Film Archives.

== Cast ==
- Obba Babatundé as Lane
- Wren T. Brown as Algernon Moncrieff
- Chris Calloway as Gwendolen Fairfax
- Lanei Chapman as Cecily Cardew
- Sylvester Hayes as The Butler
- Barbara Isaacs as Merriman
- Brock Peters as Dr. Chasuble
- CCH Pounder as Miss Prism
- Daryl Roach as Jack Worthing
- Ann Weldon as Lady Bracknell

== Reception ==
Stephen Holden, writing for The New York Times, found that the film "deserves credit for breaking new ground", but lamented its technical quality, describing it as "just one step more sophisticated than a crude home movie".
