= Percy Adlon =

German filmmaker (1935–2024)

- Born: Paul Rudolf Parsifal Adlon; 1 June 1935; Munich, Gau Munich-Upper Bavaria, Germany
- Died: 10 March 2024 (aged 88); Pacific Palisades, California, U.S.
- Occupations: Director, screenwriter, producer
- Years active: 1975–2024
- Spouse: Eleonore Haus
- Children: 1
- Relatives: Lorenz Adlon (great-grandfather); Pamela Adlon (former daughter-in-law); Gideon Adlon (granddaughter); Odessa A'zion (granddaughter)

Paul Rudolf Parsifal "Percy" Adlon (German: [ˈpɛʁsi ˈaːdlɔn]; 1 June 1935 – 10 March 2024) was a German director, screenwriter, and producer. He is associated with the New German Cinema movement (ca. 1965–1985), and is known for his strong female characters and positive portrayals of lesbian relationships. He is best known for his 1987 film Bagdad Cafe, starring Marianne Sägebrecht, CCH Pounder and Jack Palance and subsequent films such as Rosalie Goes Shopping (1989), Salmonberries (1991) and Younger and Younger (1993). Adlon's films were shown in competition regularly at international film festivals, such as the Cannes Film Festival, the Berlin International Film Festival, and others.

== Early life ==
Adlon was born on June 1, 1935, in Munich, Germany. He grew up in Ammerland, Starnberger See. He studied art, theater history, and German literature at LMU Munich; took acting and singing classes; and was a member of a student theater group.

== Career ==
Adlon started his professional career as an actor, became interested in radio work, was a narrator and editor of literature series and a presenter and voice-over actor in television for 10 years. In 1970, Adlon made his first short film for Bavarian television, followed by more than 150 documentary films about art and the human condition. His first was a one-hour portrait of French artist and writer Tomi Ungerer, entitled Tomi Ungerer's Landleben. Adlon became fascinated by Ungerer after meeting at an exhibition in Munich and spending time at his home in Nova Scotia, so decided to make him the subject of his first film.

Adlon's first feature film Céleste (1980) was about the relationship between the French writer Marcel Proust and his cook Céleste Albaret during the last years of Proust's life.

In 1987 he directed Bagdad Cafe, starring Marianne Sägebrecht as a German tourist, CCH Pounder as a motel and truck stop cafe owner in the Mojave Desert, and Jack Palance. Critically acclaimed, Roger Ebert awarded the film 3½ out of 4 stars in his review, stating that "[Percy Adlon] is saying something in this movie about Europe and America, about the old and the new, about the edge of the desert as the edge of the American Dream" and that the charm of Bagdad Cafe is that "every character and every moment is unanticipated, obscurely motivated, of uncertain meaning and vibrating with life". The Japanese filmmaker Akira Kurosawa cited Bagdad Cafe as one of his 100 favorite films.

In 1989, Adlon directed Rosalie Goes Shopping, starring Sägebrecht, Brad Davis, and Judge Reinhold, which was screened at the 1989 Cannes Film Festival. The film met mixed critical reviews, with Deseret News describing it as "dark satire masquerading as bright comedy" and a comment on American consumerism, while Rita Kempley of The Washington Post considered it to be "deficit of dramatic tension" and thought that Adlon's message was "scatterbrained".

In 1991, Adlon directed Salmonberries, a picture starring k.d. lang as Kotzebue, an orphaned Eskimo and young woman of androgynous appearance who has a lesbian relationship with an East German widowed librarian. The film was generally well-received, with Kevin Thomas of the L.A. Times describing it as "endearing, remarkably assured and stunning-looking" and noted that Adlon with sensitivity "raises crucial questions of cultural and sexual identity", though Janet Maslin of The New York Times called it a "halting, awkward effort" with "stilted direction" and "sharp camera angles, arty editing".

In 1993, Adlon directed the film Younger and Younger, starring Donald Sutherland, Brendan Fraser and Lolita Davidovich. The film won Adlon the Silver Raven Award at the Brussels International Fantastic Film Festival. Leonard Klady of Variety considered it to be an "unusual human comedy", a family yarn which "spins out from its simple premise into fantasy, music, black comedy and innumerable offbeat digressions." Klady further noted that the film illustrated "Adlon's unique method of tackling everyday life", which has "ironically been the greatest strength and most problematic aspect to his commercial appeal".

In 1997, Adlon co-produced Eat Your Heart Out, a romantic comedy film filmed in Venice Beach, California, which was directed by his son, Felix Adlon.

Adlon co-directed his final picture, Mahler on the Couch (2010) with his son Felix, a period film about an affair between Alma Mahler and Walter Gropius, and the subsequent psychoanalysis of Mahler's husband Gustav Mahler by Sigmund Freud. In a review for The Hollywood Reporter, Kirk Honeycutt wrote that the film "manages to pose a serious, intimate study in obsessive jealousy while, like a gaga celebrity hunter, bumping into just about everybody who's anybody in Viennese society circa 1910... The film's great gift, though, is Romaner... She fully inhabits the role of this complex personality whose passion for love and art collides with her role of wife and mother."

== Personal life ==
Percy Adlon was the great-grandson of Lorenz Adlon, the founder of the Hotel Adlon. He was the grandson of Louis Adlon Sr., and the son of opera tenor Rudolf Laubenthal. His son, Felix, also a film director, is the former husband of American actress Pamela Adlon and the father of her three daughters, including actresses Odessa A'zion and Gideon Adlon.

Percy and Eleonore Adlon lived in Pacific Palisades, California. Percy Adlon died there on 10 March 2024, at the age of 88.

Thomas Meyerhöfer is a half-brother of Percy, 15 years younger and son of Emil Meyerhöfer.

== Awards ==
Award	Year	Recipient(s)	Category	Result	Ref.
Adolf Grimme Awards, Germany	1979	The Guardian and His Poet (1978)	Award in Gold Fiction/Entertainment	Won, shared with lead actor Rolf Illig	
Amanda Award, Norway	1989	Bagdad Cafe (1987)	Best Foreign Feature Film (Årets utenlandske spillefilm)	Won	
Bavarian Film Awards	1988	Bagdad Cafe (1987)	Best Screenplay (Drehbuchpreis)	Won, shared with Eleanore Adlon	
Bavarian Film Awards	1988	Fünf letzte Tage (1982)	Best Direction	Won	
Bavarian TV Awards	1997	The Glamorous World of the Adlon Hotel (1996)	Directing	Won	
Brussels International Festival of Fantastic Film (BIFFF)	1994	Younger and Younger (1993)	Silver Raven	Won	
Cannes Film Festival	1989	Rosalie Goes Shopping (1989)	Palme d'Or	Nominated	
Chicago International Film Festival	1984	The Swing (1983)	Gold Hugo Best Feature	Nominated	
Chicago International Film Festival	1984	Fünf letzte Tage (1982)	Gold Hugo Best Feature	Nominated	
Chicago International Film Festival	1984	Céleste (1980)	Gold Hugo Best Feature	Nominated	
César Awards	1989	Bagdad Cafe (1987)	Best Foreign Film (Meilleur film étranger)	Won	
César Awards	1989	Bagdad Cafe (1987)	Best Film of the European Community (Meilleur film de l'Europe communautaire)	Won	
Ernst Lubitsch Award	1988	Bagdad Cafe (1987)	Ernst Lubitsch Award	Won	
Film Independent Spirit Awards	1989	Bagdad Cafe (1987)	Best Foreign Film	Nominated	
French Syndicate of Cinema Critics Award	1989	Bagdad Cafe (1987)	Best Foreign Film	Won, tied with The Dead	
Guild of German Art House Cinemas	1989	Bagdad Cafe (1987)	Gold German Film (Deutscher Film)	Won	
Guild of German Art House Cinemas	1989	Céleste (1980)	Silver German Film (Deutscher Film)	Nominated	
Manhattan Film Festival	2012	Céleste (1980)	Buzz Award	Won	
Medias Central European Film Festival 7+1	2011	Mahler on the Couch (2010)	Audience Award Best Picture	Won, shared with Felix Adlon	
Montreal World Film Festival	1991	Salmonberries (1991)	Grand Prix des Amériques	Won	
Robert Festival	1989	Bagdad Cafe (1987)	Best Foreign Film (Årets udenlandske spillefilm)	Won	
Tokyo International Film Festival	1993	Younger and Younger (1993)	Tokyo Grand Prix	Nominated	
Valladolid International Film Festival	1985	Sugarbaby (1985)	Silver Spike	Won	
Venice Film Festival	1982	Fünf letzte Tage (1982)	OCIC Award	Won	
Venice Film Festival	1982	Fünf letzte Tage (1982)	Golden Lion	Won	

== Filmography ==
- Von Nimbus der Ferne (The Aura in the Distance) (1974, documentary) director, writer
- Der Vormund und sein Dichter (The Guardian and the Poet) (1978, TV film) director, writer, producer (Adolf Grimme Award in Gold)
- Herr Kischott (1980, TV film) director
- Céleste (1980) director, writer (Special Jury Award IFF Chicago)
- Fünf letzte Tage (Five Last Days) (1982) director (German Federal Film Award, Bavarian Film Award, OCIC-Prize, IFF Venice, 1982)
- The Swing (1983) director, writer
- Sugarbaby a.k.a. Zuckerbaby (1985) director, writer (Ernst-Lubitsch-Award for Marianne Sägebrecht)
- Herschel und die Musik der Sterne (1986, TV film) director, writer
- Out of Rosenheim a.k.a. Bagdad Cafe (US) (1987) director, writer, producer (Grand Prix IFF Rio de Janeiro, César, Best Foreign Film (French Film Award), Ernst Lubitsch Award (director), Swedish and Danish Film Academies, Bavarian Film Award (original screenplay), Prix Humanum, Belgium.)
- Babycakes (1989, TV film), American remake of Zuckerbaby aka Sugarbaby, co-writer
- Rosalie Goes Shopping (1989) director, writer, producer (official German Entry, 1989 Cannes Film Festival. Best Film - Section "Cinema & Denaro", IFF EuropaCinema & TV, Viareggio.)
- Red Hot + Blue: A Tribute to Cole Porter (1990, TV film) director
- Salmonberries (1991) director, writer a.k.a. Percy Adlon's Salmonberries (Germany: poster title) (Grand Prix des Ameriques, Montreal. Bavarian Film Awards for director P.A. and for Rosel Zech, Best Actress.)
- Younger and Younger (1993) director, writer, producer (Silver Raven, Brussels. Best Actress IFF Tokyo Lolita Davidovich)
- In der glanzvollen Welt des Hotel Adlon (1996, TV film) director, a.k.a. The Glamorous World of the Adlon Hotel (Bavarian Television Award)
- Eat Your Heart Out (1997) producer
- Die Straußkiste (1999) director, writer, cinematographer, a.k.a. Forever Flirt (International: English title)
- Hawaiian Gardens (2001) director, writer
- Koenig's Sphere: The German Sculptor Fritz Koenig at Ground Zero (2001) director, a.k.a. Koenigs Kugel (German title)
- Bagdad Cafe - The Musical (2003–2006) director
- Orbela's People (2007)
- Mahler auf der Couch (2010)

== Other work ==
- L'elisir d'amore (2003) opera by Gaetano Donizetti, directed by Adlon for the Berlin State Opera.
- Wolkenstein (2004) A new opera by Wilfried Hiller and Felix Mitterer, directed by Adlon. Premiere at the Staatsoper Nürnberg.
