= The Swing (film) =

1983 film by Percy Adlon

- German: Die Schaukel
- Directed by: Percy Adlon
- Screenplay by: Percy Adlon
- Based on: The Swing by Annette Kolb
- Produced by: Eleonore Adlon; Luggi Waldleitner
- Cinematography: Jürgen Martin
- Edited by: Clara Fabry
- Music by: Peer Raben
- Production companies: Bayerischer Rundfunk; Pelemele Film; Pro-ject Filmproduktion; Roxy Film
- Distributed by: Filmverlag der Autoren
- Release date: October 14, 1983
- Running time: 133 minutes
- Country: West Germany
- Language: German

The Swing (German: Die Schaukel) is a 1983 West German film directed by Percy Adlon. The film was based on the literary work of autobiographer Annette Kolb.
