= The Gospel at Colonus =

- Original Broadway Playbill
- Music: Bob Telson
- Lyrics: Lee Breuer and Bob Telson
- Book: Lee Breuer
- Basis: Oedipus at Colonus by Sophocles
- Productions: 1983 Brooklyn Academy of Music; 1985 American Music Theater Festival, Philadelphia; 1987 Guthrie Theatre, Minneapolis; 1988 Lunt-Fontanne Theatre, Broadway; 1990 American Conservatory Theater, San Francisco; 1995 in Malvern, Pa. at the People's Light and Theatre Co. Freefest 2004 Apollo Theater; 2010 Ordway Center for the Performing Arts, St. Paul; 2015 Nate Holden Performing Arts Center, Los Angeles; 2015 Playhouse on the Square, Memphis 2018 Coatesville Cultural Society at the First Unitarian Church of Philadelphia
- Awards: Pulitzer Prize finalist, 1985

The Gospel at Colonus is an African-American musical version of Sophocles's tragedy, Oedipus at Colonus. The show was created in 1983 by the experimental-theatre director Lee Breuer, one of the founders of the seminal American avant-garde theatre company Mabou Mines, and composer Bob Telson. The musical was a finalist for the Pulitzer Prize for Drama. The show had a brief run on Broadway in 1988.

== Productions ==
The Gospel at Colonus premiered at the Brooklyn Academy of Music's Next Wave Festival in November to December 1983.

The following year it received a production at the Arena Stage in Washington D.C. running from Nov 23, 1984 – Dec 30, 1984

The musical ran at the American Music Theater Festival in Philadelphia in September 1985.

A production at the Alliance Theatre, Atlanta, Georgia, in 1987 included Morgan Freeman and the Five Blind Boys of Alabama.

The Gospel at Colonus opened on Broadway at the Lunt-Fontanne Theatre on March 24, 1988, following previews that began on March 11. The production closed on May 15, 1988, after 61 performances and 15 previews. Directed by Lee Breuer, the cast featured Morgan Freeman (Messenger), Sam Butler, Jr. (The Singer), Clarence Fountain and the Five Blind Boys of Alabama (Oedipus) and the Institutional Radio Choir of Brooklyn. Breuer was nominated for the 1988 Tony Award for his book.

The musical was a finalist for the 1985 Pulitzer Prize for Drama. The musical won the 1984 Obie Award as Best Musical.

The musical was produced at the Apollo Theater, New York City, in October 2004, featuring Charles S. Dutton as the Preacher, the Blind Boys of Alabama and the Legendary Soul Stirrers.

The production at the Nate Holden Performing Arts Center, Los Angeles, by the Ebony Repertory Theatre was nominated for the 2015 Los Angeles Drama Critics Circle Awards for theatrical excellence.

In 2018, Breuer and Telson reunited most of the original 1983 BAM cast to present The Gospel at Colonus at the Delacorte Theater in Central Park. Hilton Als wrote in The New Yorker,

Superlatives are increasingly difficult to back up, since most of the world speaks and tweets in exclamation points by now, but I think it's safe to say that the director Lee Breuer's 'The Gospel at Colonus' is a masterpiece. I first saw it at BAM in 1983, when it premièred, and I left the theatre with my shirtfront drenched with tears and the perspiration of relief: here was a portrait of black life—of black music, joy, and pain—that I could understand. Brilliantly recasting Sophocles' tragedy 'Oedipus at Colonus' as a Pentecostal sermon, Breuer and his incredible composer, Bob Telson, got at the heart of difference and history and how the two helped create America.

In 2025, Shayok Misha Chowdhury directed an outdoor revival of the musical at Little Island at Pier 55, starring Frank Senior and Davóne Tines as Orpheus, Samantha Howard as Antigone, Stephanie Berry as The Preacher, Ayana George Jackson as Ismene, and Kim Burrell as Theseus. Writing for The New York Times, Laura Collins-Hughes concluded that "the ambition here is great, the talent considerable, the result less than the sum of its myriad parts. What will move you is the music. It is flat-out glorious."

== Overview ==
Breuer and Telson handed the storytelling duties to a black Pentecostal preacher and the choir of his church, who in turn enacted the story of Oedipus's torment and redemption as a modern parable. They employed the unusual device of casting The Blind Boys of Alabama to collectively portray Oedipus as well as the Institutional Radio Choir in Brooklyn and Chancel Choir of the Abyssinian Baptist Church in Harlem. Other casting innovations in the performance include multiple actors in single roles, such as when The Messenger is called upon to assume the role of Oedipus in tandem with the singer cast when the role calls for stage motion that would be difficult for the blind singer to negotiate alone, the multiplicity of Oedipus's daughters and one son when the children of Oedipus appear collectively (with Jevetta Steele as Ismene, her sister Jearlyn Steele doubling for actress Isabell O'Connor as Antigone, and brothers J.D. and Fred Steele standing in as Polynices and Eteocles, with actor Kevin Davis doubling as Polynices), and, indeed, with different portions of the cast, singly and in groups, assuming the duties of the traditional Greek chorus.

The New York Times's Mel Gussow has expressed the view that the result was the translation of the Greek myth into a Christian parable. In his review of the BAM production, Gussow noted: "It is surprising how organically "Oedipus" can fit within the framework of a gospel musical... the evening has the shape of a church service."

While the traditions of Greek theater as religious ritual are unfamiliar to modern audiences, Gospel at Colonus reaffirms those possibilities by its use of call-and-response and ecstatic, sung re-enactment of a culturally important story.

== Television and film ==
In 1985 PBS televised the original Brooklyn Academy of Music production, as presented by the American Music Theater Festival at the Annenberg Center in Philadelphia, as part of the Great Performances series. The performers included Morgan Freeman as The Messenger, Carl Lumbly as Theseus, Jevetta Steele as Ismene, and Robert Earl Jones as Creon. In the 1985 incarnation, The Soul Stirrers (credited collectively) and the Institutional Radio Choir assume roles as citizens of Colonus.

The first-act song "How Shall I See You Through My Tears?" was used as the opening number of the 2003 film, Camp.

== Musical numbers ==
- "Live Where You Can"
- "Fair Colonus"
- "Stop; Do Not Go On!"
- "Who Is This Man?"
- "How Shall I See You Through My Tears?"
- "A Voice Foretold"
- "Never Drive You Away"
- "Come Back Home"
- "Evil Kindness"
- "You'd Take Him Away"
- "Numberless Are The World's Wonders"
- "Lift Me Up (Like A Dove)"
- "Evil"
- "Love Unconquerable"
- "Sunlight Of No Light"
- "Eternal Sleep"
- "Lift Him Up"
- "Now Let The Weeping Cease"
