= Rosalie Goes Shopping =

- Movie poster
- Directed by: Percy Adlon
- Written by: Christopher Doherty; Percy Adlon; Eleanor Adlon
- Produced by: Eleanor Adlon; Percy Adlon; Jill Griffith
- Starring: Marianne Sägebrecht; Brad Davis; Judge Reinhold
- Cinematography: Bernd Heinl
- Edited by: Jean-Claude Piroué
- Music by: Bob Telson
- Distributed by: Bayerischer Rundfunk
- Release date: 9 November 1989
- Running time: 94 minutes
- Country: West Germany
- Language: English
- Box office: US$574,080 (United States only)

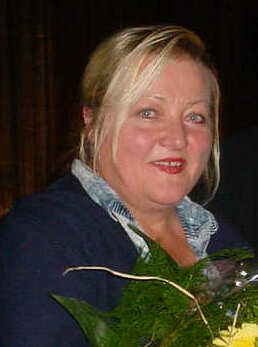
Marianne Sägebrecht, star of Rosalie Goes Shopping

Rosalie Goes Shopping is a 1989 English-language West German film directed by Percy Adlon and starring Marianne Sägebrecht, Brad Davis, and Judge Reinhold.

== Plot ==
Rosalie Greenspace is an expatriate German woman living in rural Arkansas with her eccentric American husband Ray (Liebling), who works as a crop-duster airplane pilot. They have seven children: Kindi, the eldest son who is a US Army soldier stationed out of state; Barbara, the eldest daughter who is a good-natured overachieving college student; Schatzi, an underachieving high school student; Schnucki, a flamboyant gourmet cook; teenage twin girls who are never named; and Herzi, the youngest child. Rosalie loves to shop too much to let a little thing like no money stop her. Every day she goes on lavish shopping sprees in the nearby small town of Stuttgart (the same name of her hometown in West Germany) where she forges checks, uses false credit cards, and other means to supplement her livelihood with purchases of fancy foods for Kindi to cook and various clothing and appliances for her large house. A devout Catholic, she has a twisted view on religion when she goes every day to a small church and confesses her sins of stealing and swindling to a local priest, believing that if she confesses her crimes to her priest, her "sins" will not become sins anymore.

Schatzi is dating April, a girl from his high school whom he brings over to the house one day to meet the family for dinner. April is awkward about the Greenspace family's antics as well as their obsession with watching videotaped TV commercials as their only form of entertainment. She soon leaves Schatzi, finding his family too weird.

Rosalie's parents come for a visit one day from West Germany, and Kindi also arrives for a visit after taking a leave of absence from the military. During the week of the visits, both of Rosalie's parents, as well as Kindi, find her self-indulgent spending of other people's money illegal, but Rosalie appears oblivious to her own actions. However, when the local shopkeepers no longer take her bad checks or bad credit cards, Rosalie is reduced to stealing from her eldest daughter, Barbara's, checking account to buy gifts for her parents, which earns Barbara's wrath and contempt as she finally realizes that her mother is out of control with stealing and spending.

After Rosalie's parents leave to return to West Germany, and Kindi returns to the Army, Rosalie is left all by herself as she ponders an end to her spending lifestyle. Rosalie is even forced to abandon her daily food shopping sprees to purchase expensive food for Schnucki to cook and instead is forced to bring home cheap fast food and take-out pizza for the family in place of the fancy daily dinners that Schnucki prepares. In the meantime, Ray begins having problems with his eyesight and nearly crashes his crop-duster biplane during a routine run which gets him fired from the aviation company he works at.

Life now begins looking pretty bleak for Rosalie until Barbara pushes her into buying a "guilt gift" of a PC; a modern-for-the-time desktop computer, complete with a modem. After first using the computer for some Internet and Prodigy surfing skills, Rosalie gets an inspiration when she has a talk with her friendly mailman, where after she confides in him about her financial predicament, he tells her: "when you're $100,000 in debt, it's your problem. But when you're $1 million in debt, it's the bank's".

Impersonating a wealthy German businesswoman, Rosalie travels to the state capital of Little Rock and meets with a bank president for a large loan to open a new multinational corporation which she receives due to her falsified credentials she forged. Afterwards, Rosalie now has access to the bank's financial records and, with the help of her new PC, she evolves from a "master shopper" into a "master hacker", and Rosalie is soon back spending money once again.

As the film comes to an end, Rosalie, using her new ill-gotten wealth of $2 million that she steals from the large bank, buys for Ray a new crop-dusting airplane so he can open his own crop-dusting business, and has him visit an eye doctor where he gets a pair of eyeglasses which cures him of his vision problem. She also goes back to her church where she confesses her latest crimes to the bewildered priest and plots to flee the country with her family with her new millions to use abroad. As a farewell gift for the priest, she purchases a large and brand-new copper bell for the church.

== Cast ==
- Marianne Sägebrecht - Rosalie Greenspace
- Brad Davis - Ray 'Liebling' Greenspace
- Judge Reinhold - The Priest
- Erika Blumberger - Rosalie's Mother
- Willy Harlander - Rosalie's Father
- John Hawkes - Schnucki Greenspace
- Patricia Zehentmayr - Barbara Greenspace
- Courtney Kraus - April
- Alex Winter - Schatzi Greenspace
- Lisa Fitzhugh - Greenspace Twin
- Lori Fitzhugh - Greenspace Twin
- David Denney - Kindi Greenspace
- Dina Chandel - Herzi Greenspace
- Ed Geldart - Burt
- Bonnie Pemberton - Linda
- John William Galt - Bank President

== Production ==
Rosalie Goes Shopping was shot in various locations in Arkansas, including Stuttgart, Little Rock, and DeValls Bluff.

== Box office ==
In the United States, the film grossed $574,080.

== Reception ==
The film was in competition at the 1989 Cannes Film Festival. The film met mixed critical reviews. The Deseret News described it as "dark satire masquerading as bright comedy", acknowledging it as a comment on American consumerism, and praised Sägebrecht's "terrific comic talents". Both film critic Roger Ebert and TV Guide gave it three stars (of a maximum four). The Washington Post, on the other hand, regretted the film's "deficit of dramatic tension" and considered Adlon's message "scatterbrained" and "thin stuff indeed".

Stanley Kauffmann of The New Republic wrote- "All the actors are dreadful" and "What plot there is doesn't matter."
