= Bagdad Cafe =

1987 West German drama film

- French-language film poster
- Directed by: Percy Adlon
- Written by: Eleonore Adlon; Percy Adlon
- Produced by: Eleonore Adlon; Percy Adlon
- Starring: Marianne Sägebrecht; CCH Pounder; Jack Palance
- Cinematography: Bernd Heinl
- Edited by: Norbert Herzner
- Music by: Bob Telson
- Production companies: Bayerischer Rundfunk; Hessischer Rundfunk; Pelemele Film; Pro-ject Filmproduktion
- Distributed by: Island Pictures
- Release dates: 12 November 1987 (Europe); 22 April 1988 (U.S.)
- Running time: 108 minutes (German); 95 minutes (U.S.)
- Country: West Germany
- Languages: English; German
- Box office: $3.7 million

Bagdad Cafe (sometimes Bagdad Café, titled Out of Rosenheim in Germany) is a 1987 English-language West German film directed by Percy Adlon. It is a comedy-drama set in a remote truck stop and motel in the Mojave Desert in the U.S. state of California.

Inspired by Carson McCullers' novella The Ballad of the Sad Café (1951), the film centers on two women who have recently separated from their husbands, and the blossoming friendship that ensues.

It runs 108 minutes in the German version and a shorter 95 minutes in the U.S. version. The song "Calling You", sung by Jevetta Steele and written by Bob Telson, was nominated for the Academy Award for Best Original Song at the 61st Academy Awards.

== Plot ==
German tourists Jasmin Münchgstettner from Rosenheim and her husband fight while driving through the Mojave Desert. She storms out of the car, taking a suitcase, and walks down the road, while he drives off in the opposite direction. When he comes back through, Jasmin quickly hides so he cannot find her.

He barrels into the Bagdad Cafe, an isolated truck stop cafe, to look for Jasmin. Discovering they cannot sell beer, he asks for a coffee and finds out their coffee machine is on the fritz. The co-owner Sal offers coffee from a large yellow thermos he had just found on the roadside, which actually belongs to the Münchgstettners.

After he leaves, the tough-as-nails and short-tempered Brenda, finding out her husband Sal forgot both to bring the new coffee machine and a rifle the local Rudi Cox needed, chews him out. Arguing outside the café, she lists the many ways in which he does not do his part. Sal threatens to leave if she does not let up, so Brenda sends him packing.

Brenda, saddened by the argument, is sitting slumped in front of the café with a tear-stained face when Jasmin comes up, seeking a motel room. She also runs the adjacent motel, so checks her in. Initially suspicious of the foreigner, Brenda looks through her things and finds only mens clothes--most likely the German couple had inadvertently switched suitcases. Deciding Jasmin is a threat, she gets the sheriff to check her out. However, he finds no need for concern.

The cafe is regularly visited by an assortment of colorful characters, including strange ex-Hollywood set-painter Rudy Cox and glamorous tattoo artist Debby. Brenda's son Salomon plays J. S. Bach preludes on the piano all day, and her teenaged daughter Phyllis is constantly coming and going with different guys.

With an ability to empathize with people she meets at the cafe and helped by an interest in cleaning and performing magic tricks, Jasmin gradually transforms the cafe and the people in it. Brenda herself metamorphosizes from being an angry person to a relaxed person. Together, Jasmin with her magic tricks and Brenda with a friendlier attitude, make the cafe a gathering place for truckers and local people.

Thanks to their love, Jasmin also is able to overcome her loneliness. Rudy sees her as a muse, and with each subsequent portrait she also transforms, becoming more relaxed and accepting of her body and herself.

There is a temporary setback when the sheriff, overhearing news of the café, stops by to see for himself. Finding Jasmin there, he reminds her that she has overstayed her tourist visa. She unhappily leaves, the café reverts to its former subdued self, staying that way until her return months later.

Jasmin has rejoined the motley 'family' of misfits, having found herself. The café expands its repertoire of entertainment to singing and dancing. Rudi proposes, ensuring she can stay, and Sal returns to Brenda.

== Cast ==
- Marianne Sägebrecht as Jasmin Münchgstettner
- CCH Pounder as Brenda
- Jack Palance as Rudi Cox
- Christine Kaufmann as Debby
- Monica Calhoun as Phyllis
- Darron Flagg as Salomo
- George Aguilar as Cahuenga
- G. Smokey Campbell as Sal
- Hans Stadlbauer as Herr Münchgstettner
- Alan S. Craig as Eric
- Apesanahkwat as Sheriff Arnie

== Production ==
The script was inspired by a road trip across U.S. Route 66 taken by director Percy Adlon and his wife Eleanor, a producer, in 1984. The town of Barstow, California reminded the couple of "purgatory." The film was shot in sequence.

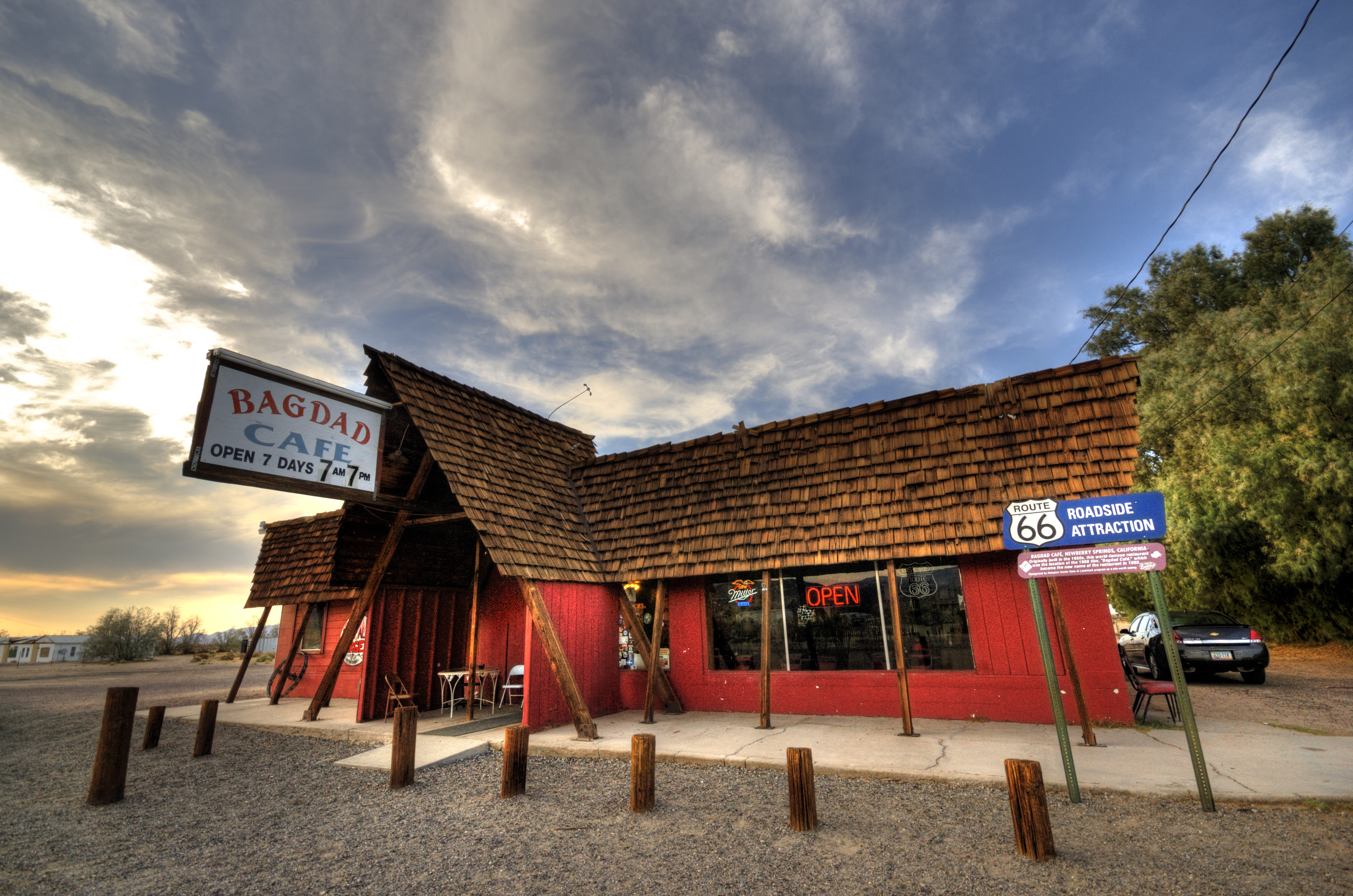
Bagdad Cafe, Newberry Springs (location on Google Maps)

The setting, Bagdad, California, is a former town on U.S. Route 66. After being bypassed by Interstate 40 in 1973, it was abandoned and eventually razed. While the town had a "Bagdad Cafe", the film was shot at the then Sidewinder Cafe in Newberry Springs, 50 miles (80 km) west of the site of Bagdad. The cafe became a European tourist destination; when it was purchased by new owners in 1995, they decided to capitalize on the film's popularity by changing its name to Bagdad Cafe. A small noticeboard on the cafe wall features snapshots of the film's cast and crew.

== Reception ==
=== Box office ===
The film was successful at the European box office, and was one of the most financially successful foreign productions in the U.S. at that time, grossing then $3.59 million.

=== Critical reception ===
The film received positive reviews and critical acclaim. Roger Ebert awarded the film 3½ out of 4 stars in his review:

[Percy Adlon] is saying something in this movie about Europe and America, about the old and the new, about the edge of the desert as the edge of the American Dream. I am not sure exactly what it is, but that is comforting; if a director could assemble these strange characters and then know for sure what they were doing in the same movie together, he would be too confident to find the humor in their situation. The charm of "Bagdad Cafe" is that every character and every moment is unanticipated, obscurely motivated, of uncertain meaning and vibrating with life.

Baghdad Cafe holds an 85% approval rating on Rotten Tomatoes based on 20 reviews, with a weighted average of 6.8/10.

== Awards and nominations ==
- 1988: won Best Foreign Language Film at the 23rd Guldbagge Awards
- 1988: won Bavarian Film Award Best Screenplay (Eleonore & Percy Adlon)
- 1988: won Ernst Lubitsch Award (Percy Adlon)
- 1989: nominated for the Oscar for Best Music, Original Song (Bob Telson) for the song "Calling You"
- 1989: won Amanda Best Foreign Feature Film (Percy Adlon)
- 1989: won Artios Best Casting for Feature Film, Comedy (Al Onorato and Jerold Franks)
- 1989: won César Award for Best Foreign Film (Percy Adlon)

== Soundtrack ==
"Calling You"
An instrumental rendition of "Calling You" by Claude Reid.

"Prelude No. 1 in C Major, BWV 846"

"Prelude No. 5 in D major, BWV 850"
Performed by Kimiko Ishizaka.

The soundtrack features the songs "Calling You", written by Bob Telson and sung by Jevetta Steele, and "Brenda, Brenda" with lyrics by Lee Breuer and music by Bob Telson, sung by Jevetta's sister Jearlyn Steele, featuring the harmonica of William Galison, and also has a track in which the director narrates the story, including the film's missing scenes.

The principal piano pieces, performed by Darron Flagg, are preludes from Book I of Bach's The Well-Tempered Clavier: the C major, no. 1, BWV 845; the C minor, BWV 846, no. 2; and the D major, no. 5, BWV 850.

== Home media ==
For the film's 30th anniversary in 2018, StudioCanal reissued Bagdad Cafe as a 4K digital restoration on DVD and Blu-ray. In April 2021, Shout! Factory re-released the film digitally.

== Television series ==
In 1990 the film was re-created as a television series starring James Gammon, Whoopi Goldberg, Cleavon Little, and Jean Stapleton, with Stapleton as the abandoned tourist, and Goldberg as the restaurant operator. In the TV version the tourist was no longer from Germany. The series was shot in the conventional multi-camera sitcom format, before a studio audience. The show did not attract a sizable audience and it was cancelled after two seasons.
