= Israel Hicks =

American theatre director (1943–2010)

- Born: August 23, 1943; Orangeburg, South Carolina, U.S.
- Died: July 3, 2010 (aged 66); Sleepy Hollow, New York, U.S.
- Education: Boston University (BFA); New York University (MFA)

Israel Theo Hicks (August 23, 1943 – July 3, 2010) was an American theatre director who produced works at regional theaters around the country and Off Broadway, and was best known for his stagings of the entire series of plays by August Wilson about the African-American experience in the U.S. during and following the Great Migration.

== Early life ==
Hicks was born on August 23, 1943, in Orangeburg, South Carolina. He moved to Brooklyn, New York City, with his family as a child, and spent summers on his grandfather's farm in South Carolina. He developed a love of theatre while attending the Boston University College of Fine Arts and honed his skills while earning a Master of Fine Arts degree from New York University. Lloyd Richards, who directed several of Wilson's plays on Broadway, was a mentor to Hicks at NYU and introduced him to the works of August Wilson.

== Career ==
Hicks was an acting instructor at Carnegie Mellon University and headed theatre arts programs at the SUNY Purchase's Conservatroy of Theatre Arts and at the Mason Gross School of the Arts of Rutgers University. Hicks directed at the American Conservatory Theater, the Cleveland Play House, the Guthrie Theater, the Pasadena Playhouse, the Pittsburgh Public Theater and Primary Stages.

While at the Denver Center for the Performing Arts, Hicks was asked by artistic director Donovan Marley if he wanted to direct the full cycle of August Wilson's plays and responded immediately "Hell, yeah". He was described by The New York Times as being the first person known to direct the 10 plays Wilson wrote in The Pittsburgh Cycle, starting with Fences in 1990, Joe Turner's Come and Gone in 1991, The Piano Lesson in 1993, Ma Rainey's Black Bottom in 1994, Two Trains Running in 1996, Seven Guitars in 1997, Jitney in 2002, King Hedley II in 2003, Gem of the Ocean in 2006 and Radio Golf in 2009. Hicks credited his time spent in the South as giving him a connection to Wilson's plays, saying his characters were "like members of my family, my uncles and aunts" and that to him "August's plays are familiar clothing". Wilson's play cycle documents African American life in the 20th century in Pittsburgh's Hill District and Hicks often wore a Pittsburgh Pirates baseball cap as his trademark while directing. In his two decades with the Denver Center Theatre Company, Hicks directed nearly 20 plays, and was scheduled to direct Ruined in 2011 for the company. Kent Thompson called Hicks' commitment to directing the entire play cycle "extremely rare in the American theatre today".

Hicks also co-founded with Wren T. Brown the Ebony Repertory Theatre in Los Angeles and served as its artistic director.

He was described as a major influence on African-American actors, with Stephen Henderson describing Hicks "as a role model as well as a leading figure in the field" and that "so many actors, directors, and playwrights owe the start of their careers to him". Henderson said he was among many who felt "Hicks was one of the best directors [he] ever worked with as an actor" as a result of his "remarkable ability with an ensemble, to bring it together, to elicit better performances from the actors than they often gave in other productions".

== Later life ==
A resident of White Plains, New York, Hicks died of prostate cancer at age 66 on July 3, 2010, in Sleepy Hollow, New York. He was survived by his second wife, Renée Harriston-Hicks.
