= Adlon =

Adlon is a surname. Notable people with the surname include:

- Lorenz Adlon (1849–1921), German hotelier
- Louis Adlon (1908–1947), German-American film actor in Hollywood
- Percy Adlon (1935–2024), German film producer
- Pamela Adlon (born 1966), American film actress

== See also ==
- Hotel Adlon, Berlin, Germany – built by Lorenz Adlon
- Hotel Adlon, German film
