= Sebastian Fischer (actor) =

German actor and voice actor (1928–2018)

- Born: 2 September 1928; Berlin, Germany
- Died: 17 October 2018 (aged 90)
- Occupation: Actor
- Years active: 1953-2018

Sebastian Fischer (2 September 1928 – 17 October 2018) was a German actor. He has also worked frequently as a voice actor, dubbing foreign-language films for release in Germany.

== Filmography ==
Year	Title	Role	Notes
1953	So ein Affentheater		
1955	Hotel Adlon	Paul Rippert	
1957	The Dragon's Blood	Siegfried	
1961	The Picture of Dorian Gray	Dorian Gray	TV film

== Bibliography ==
- Jerry Vermilye. Ingmar Bergman: His Life and Films. McFarland, 2002.
