= Tina Gloriani =

Italian actress (1935–2024)

- Born: Concetta Gloriani; 11 December 1935; Rome, Italy
- Died: 24 March 2024 (aged 88); Rome, Italy
- Education: Centro Sperimentale di Cinematografia
- Occupations: Actress; painter; sculptor
- Years active: 1955–1963

Tina Gloriani (11 December 1935 – 24 March 2024) was an Italian actress who appeared in Italian classic and peplum cinema.

== Early life and career ==
Gloriani was born on December 11, 1935, in Rome as Concetta Gloriani. After studying literature and philosophy at university, she began to develop the passion for art. Chosen as the protagonist of a film, she decided to attend the acting course at the Centro Sperimentale di Cinematografia. Over the course of the two years she took part in various films, and in the meantime she worked in the Prose Company at the Teatro delle Muse in Rome. After graduating, she interrupted her film and theater career and devoted herself to music, gaining some experience with the electronic synthesizer and composing her own music.

In 1978 she decided to exhibit her works and created an exhibition of informal canvases at the Remo Croce bookshop in Rome. In 1980 he created a type of sculpture, completely white, which was technically patented and is characterized by multiple positions that allow the user to have a multifaceted reading. The first sculpture work is exhibited at the personal painting exhibition at the Vismara gallery in Milan. In 1981, on the occasion of the Via Giulia Concerts, sponsored by the Municipality of Rome and the Antique Dealers of Via Giulia, the first sculpture exhibition was presented. Subsequently, in 1982, the Municipality of Milan and Rizzoli Arte sponsored the sculpture exhibition at Palazzo Arengario presented in the catalog by the critic Giuseppe Marchiori. In 1984 he presented an exhibition in the gardens of Palazzo Barberini.

Gloriani died in Rome on 24 March 2024, at the age of 88.

== Filmography ==
- La porta dei sogni (1955)
- Accadde di notte (1956)
- Solo Dio mi fermerà (1957)
- Rascel-Fifi (1957)
- The Dragon's Blood (1957)
- Quel tesoro di papa (1959)
- Violent Summer (1959)
- The Vampire and the Ballerina (1960)
- My Friend, Dr. Jekyll (1960)
- The Loves of Hercules (1960)
- Solitudine (1961)
- The Fury of Achilles (1962)
- The Monk of Monza (1963)
