= The Dragon's Blood =

Dragon's Blood
- Directed by: Giacomo Gentilomo
- Screenplay by: Giorgio Costantini; Antonio Ferrigno; Giacomo Gentilomo; Cesare Vico Ludovico
- Produced by: Antonio Ferrigno
- Starring: Sebastian Fischer; Ilaria Occhini; Rolf Tasna; Katharina Mayberg
- Cinematography: Carlo Nebiolo
- Edited by: Rodolfo Novelli
- Music by: Franco Langella
- Release date: 1957
- Running time: 93 minutes
- Country: Italy
- Language: Italian

The Dragon's Blood (Italian: Sigfrido) is a 1957 Italian fantasy film co-written and directed by Giacomo Gentilomo. It is based on Richard Wagner's Der Ring des Nibelungen.

== Plot ==
The dying Siegland reaches the house of the dwarf Mime, begging him to raise her baby, called Sigfried, and giving him in custody the sword of Sigfried's father.

Years later, the grown up Siegfried leaves in search of the treasure of the Nibelungs, and kills a dragon thanks to his invincible sword. Bathing in its blood, the resulting almost invulnerability makes him the bravest fighter of his time. He discovers a magic ring and obtains Alberich's magic hat, which can make him invisible. He then goes to the court of the King Gunther of Burgund, where he wins the tournament for the hand of the beautiful princess Kriemhild, but finds an implacable opponent in Hagen von Tronje, who was defeated by him in a duel.

Thanks to his magic hat, Siegfried helps Gunther to subjugate the beautiful Brunhild, the queen of Iceland, and to make her Gunther's wife. However, after she learns of his tricks, Brunhild rejects Gunther and swears revenge against Siegfried. Hagen, meanwhile on Brunhild's side, discovers Siegfried's secret from Kriemhild: he has a vulnerable spot on his shoulder. He manages to kill Siegfried during a hunting trip, but he perishes as well in the collapsing grotto, while trying to get hold of the treasure. Upon learning of her involuntary role in Siegfried's death, Brunhild commits suicide.

== Cast ==
- Sebastian Fischer as Siegfried
- Katharina Mayberg as Brunhild
- Ilaria Occhini as Kriemhild
- Rolf Tasna as Hagen
- Giorgio Costantini as Gunther
- Giulio Donnini as Alberich
- Bianca Doria
- Germano Longo as Gernot
- Alberto Cinquini as Mime
- Livio Lorenzon as dignitary
- Franca Mazzoni as Ute
- Pietro Tordi
- Tina Gloriani as Siegland
- Enrico Olivieri as Gisselher
- Philippe Hersent as Dwarf

== Production ==
Dragon's Blood's giant dragon was one of the earliest creatures created by special effects artist Carlo Rambaldi. Rambaldi would later be responsible for the special effects on King Kong (1976) and E.T. (1982).

== Release ==
Dragon's Blood was released in 1957. It was released in the United States with a longer 97 minute running time.
