= Hotel Adlon =

Luxury hotel in Berlin, Germany

Coordinates: 52°30′57″N 13°22′50″E

Hotel Adlon Kempinski
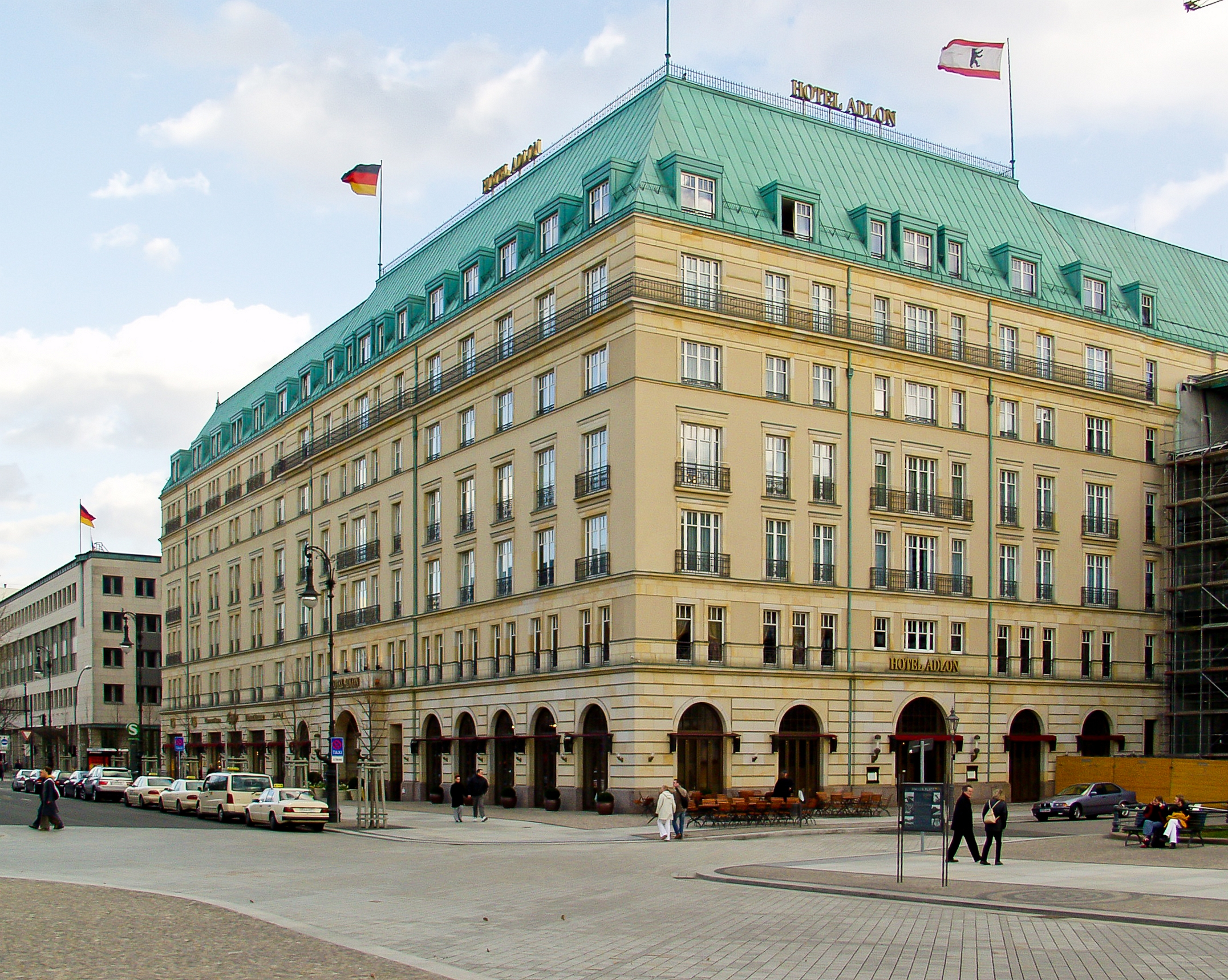
- The current Hotel Adlon Kempinski Berlin
- Hotel chain: Kempinski

General information
- Location: Berlin–Mitte, Germany, Unter den Linden 77
- Opening: Original Hotel Adlon - October 24th 1907; Current Hotel Adlon Kempinski Berlin - August 23rd 1997
- Owner: Fundus-Fonds 31
- Operator: Kempinski

Technical details
- Floor count: 7

Design and construction
- Architect: Rainer Michael Klotz

Other information
- Number of rooms: 382
- Number of restaurants: 4
- Number of bars: 5

Website
- www.kempinski.com/adlon

The Hotel Adlon Kempinski Berlin is a luxury hotel in Berlin, Germany. It is on Unter den Linden, the main boulevard in the central Mitte district, at the corner with Pariser Platz, directly opposite the Brandenburg Gate.

The original Hotel Adlon was one of the most famous hotels in Europe. It opened in 1907 and was largely destroyed in 1945 in the closing days of World War II, though a small wing continued operating until 1984. The current hotel, which opened on August 23, 1997, is a new building with a design inspired by the original.

== History ==
=== First Hotel Adlon ===
In the late 19th century, European hotels, which generally offered no more than overnight accommodation, evolved to become social gathering places which could host large receptions given by nobility and the wealthy. New hotel buildings arose all over the continent with lavishly decorated ballrooms, dining halls, arcades, smoking lounges, libraries, and coffeehouses. In 1873 the Hotel Imperial opened in Vienna, followed by the Hôtel Ritz Paris in 1898, and the London Ritz in 1906. In Berlin, the capital of the German Empire, Wilhelmine high society was eager to keep up with their rival metropolitan cities.

In 1905 Lorenz Adlon, a successful wine merchant and restaurateur originally from Mainz, purchased two properties on Unter den Linden. Adlon ran several coffeehouses in Berlin, among others in the Berlin Zoological Garden, and had raised capital to build a hotel on Pariser Platz, at the heart of the German capital. He convinced Kaiser Wilhelm II that Berlin needed a luxury hotel at the level of those in Paris, London and the other European capitals, and so the Kaiser personally interceded with the owners of the Palais Redern, a Neo-Renaissance landmark designed by Karl Friedrich Schinkel in 1830, which sat at Adlon's chosen location. The Kaiser cleared the way for Adlon's purchase of the Palais and for the subsequent demolition of the historic building.

Designed by Carl Gause and Robert Leibnitz, the hotel was built at a cost of 20 million gold marks, two million of which were the bulk of Adlon's personal fortune. Behind a rather sober façade, the hotel was the most modern in Germany with hot and cold running water, an on-site laundry, as well as its own power plant to generate electricity. It boasted a huge lobby with enormous square marble columns, a restaurant, a cafe, a palm court, a ladies' lounge, a library, a music room, a smoking room, a barber shop, a cigar shop, an interior garden with a Japanese-themed elephant fountain, and numerous grand ballrooms.

The new structure had 260 rooms, with 322 beds and 110 bathrooms. Adlon had also purchased the adjoining Hotel Reichshof, opened in 1892, and integrated it into his hotel, adding a further 45 rooms, with 69 beds and 30 bathrooms. This gave the Hotel Adlon a total of 305 rooms, with 391 beds and 140 bathrooms. The hotel was decorated in a mix of Neo-Baroque and Louis XVI styles and furnished by the Mainz company of Bembé, where Lorenz Adlon had been an apprentice carpenter in his youth. It was located in the heart of the government quarter next to the British Embassy on Wilhelmstraße, facing the French and American Embassies on Pariser Platz and only blocks from the Reich Chancellery and other government ministries further south on Wilhelmstraße.

The Adlon opened on October 23, 1907, with the Kaiser, his wife, and many other notables in attendance. It quickly became the social center of Berlin. As the rooms in the Stadtschloss were cold and drafty, the Kaiser paid an annual retainer to keep suites available for his guests. Likewise the Foreign Office used the Adlon for accommodation during state visits, with guests including Tsar Nicholas II of Russia and Maharaja Bhupinder Singh of Patiala. Notable guests of the early years included industrialists such as Thomas Edison, Henry Ford, and John D. Rockefeller, as well as politicians such as Walther Rathenau, Gustav Stresemann and the French prime minister Aristide Briand. Many wealthy Berliners lived for extended periods of time in the hotel, while its ballrooms hosted official government functions and society events.

After World War I and the abdication of the Kaiser, Lorenz Adlon remained a staunch monarchist and thus never imagined normal traffic would pass through the Brandenburg Gate's central archway, which had been reserved for the Kaiser alone. He therefore never looked before crossing in front of it. This resulted in Adlon being hit by a car in 1918 at that spot. Three years later, he was again hit by a car at exactly the same spot, dying from his injuries a few days later, on April 7, 1921. Lorenz's son Louis Adlon took over management of the hotel with his wife Tilli and their five children. A few months later, at a New Year's Eve party, Louis met Hedwig Leythen, known as Hedda, a German-born hotel guest who had been raised in America. Louis soon divorced Tilli and married Hedda.

During the "Golden Twenties", the Adlon remained one of the most famous hotels in Europe, hosting celebrity guests including Josephine Baker, Louise Brooks, Enrico Caruso, Charlie Chaplin, Marlene Dietrich, Albert Einstein, Emil Jannings, Thomas Mann, and Mary Pickford, and also international politicians such as Paul von Hindenburg, Herbert Hoover, and Franklin D. Roosevelt. The hotel was a favorite hangout of international journalists, including William L. Shirer, who mentions it frequently in his writings. The hotel's lobby and public rooms were also popular with foreign diplomats.

The hotel remained a social center of the city throughout the Nazi period, though the Nazis themselves preferred the Hotel Kaiserhof a few blocks south and directly across from the Propaganda Ministry and Hitler's Chancellery on Wilhelmplatz. In 1938, financial difficulties forced Louis Adlon to sell the annex of the hotel at 70a Wilhelmstraße, the former Hotel Reichshof, to the government, which converted it to offices for the Reich Ministry of Food and Agriculture. The Adlon continued to operate normally throughout World War II, even constructing a luxurious bomb shelter for its guests and a huge brick wall around the lobby level to protect the function rooms from flying debris. Parts of the hotel were converted to a military field hospital during the final days of the Battle of Berlin. The hotel survived the war without any major damage, having avoided the bombs and shelling that had leveled the city. On the night of May 2, 1945 a fire, allegedly started in the hotel's wine cellar by drunken Red Army soldiers, left the main building in ruins.

Louis Adlon himself was arrested in his home near Potsdam by Soviet troops on April 25 after they mistook him for a general due to his title of "Generaldirektor". He died on a street in Falkensee on May 7, 1945, of heart failure according to the death certificate.

=== East German Hotel Adlon ===
Although the main wing of the hotel on Pariser Platz had been destroyed, the damaged but surviving wings at 70a and 70b Wilhelmstraße reopened for business in August 1945, with 16 guest rooms and a small restaurant in a former function room. Although operating as the Hotel Adlon, it was no longer connected with the Adlon family, as the hotel was now located in the Soviet sector of the city. Instead, it was reported to have been operated by a man named Georg Behlert. On November 22, 1945, a meeting was held in one of the Adlon's surviving ballrooms, which resulted in the formation of DEFA, the state-owned film studio of the future East Germany. By December 1945, 36 rooms had been made habitable for guests. By 1950, the hotel had a staff of 70 and featured a conference hall seating 300, and 100 beds, with plans to add another 30 rooms, with 50 beds.

The hotel was expropriated by the East German government on December 14, 1950, and the ruined main Pariser Platz wing was demolished. On September 25, 1951, it was announced that a new Hotel Adlon would be constructed on the site, by the state. Construction never began, and after all the other buildings on Pariser Platz were demolished, the square was left as an abandoned, grassed-over buffer with the West, with the Brandenburg Gate sitting alone by the Berlin Wall, constructed in 1961.

In 1955, Hedda Adlon published a popular autobiography, Hotel Adlon. Das Berliner Hotel, in dem die große Welt zu Gast war, which was published in English in 1960 as Hotel Adlon: The Life and Death of a Great Hotel. The book was filmed in German in 1955 as Hotel Adlon by director Josef von Báky, starring Nelly Borgeaud. In 1957, Hedda signed contracts with the Kempinski company, giving them the right to purchase the Hotel Adlon name, and the property, in order to rebuild the hotel, should that ever become possible. Hedda died in 1967.

In 1964, the remaining portion of the Hotel Adlon was renovated by the East German government and the facade was rebuilt. In the 1970s, the hotel closed to guests and was converted to serve mainly as a lodging house for government apprentices. Finally, on March 10, 1984, the building was demolished.

=== Second Hotel Adlon Kempinski ===
With the reunification of Germany, Kempinski exercised their rights to the hotel name and the site. After lengthy legal proceedings, they took possession of the property, then sold the development project to Fundus Fonds, a West German investment group, with Kempinski retaining a long-term lease on the hotel. Fundus Fonds constructed a new hotel between 1995 and 1997. The building, only very loosely inspired by the original, was designed by Rainer Michael Klotz of Patzschke Klotz & Partners, and on August 23, 1997, German President Roman Herzog opened the new Hotel Adlon Kempinski Berlin. The hotel occupies the site of the original building, along with additional adjacent land. Due to its success, it was expanded twice with new wings at the rear on Behrenstrasse, designed by architect Günter Behnisch. The first wing, known as the Adlon Palais, opened in 2003, while the second, known as the Adlon Residenz, opened in 2004.

Today, the Hotel Adlon features 307 guest rooms, 78 suites, two bars, three restaurants, an Adlon To Go coffee shop, and a spa and wellness area. Following a comprehensive renovation, the pool and fitness area—which includes a swimming pool, whirlpool, sauna, and gym—reopened in September 2024.

Additionally, the Adlon-Palais on Behrenstraße houses the Adlon Spa by Resense, the Adlon Flower Atelier & Boutique, as well as the India Club restaurant.

The hotel is home to the gourmet restaurant Lorenz Adlon Esszimmer. Karlheinz Hauser served as head chef in 2000, followed by Thomas Neeser in 2002. The restaurant held one Michelin star until it was awarded a second star under head chef Hendrik Otto in 2012. Reto Brändli took over as head chef in May 2022, successfully retaining the two-star rating. In February 2025, Jonas Zörner was appointed head chef, and the restaurant was awarded one Michelin star in 2025.

In August 2026, Jagdfeld Group, which manages the fund that owns the hotel, Fundus-Fonds 31, announced its intention to sell the hotel for €280 million. When a shareholder vote was held, the required 75% majority was not reached, but Jagdfeld announced their intention to "revisit the sale" in the near future. Kempinski's lease on the hotel runs through 2032.

== Location ==
When it was built, the Hotel Adlon was famously located at Number One Unter den Linden, as the avenue was numbered starting at the western Brandenburg Gate end. The address was used in the hotel's advertising and became synonymous with it. Beginning in late 1936, the entire Unter den Linden was renumbered, starting from the eastern end by the Berlin Palace, resulting in the Adlon's address becoming Unter den Linden 77. The current Hotel Adlon Kempinski maintains this address.

== In popular culture ==
- Much of the 2011 film Unknown starring Liam Neeson takes place at the Adlon.
- The British avant rock band Henry Cow's album Unrest from 1974 has a track named "Upon Entering the Hotel Adlon".
- In a series of novels by Philip Kerr, the investigator Bernie Gunther serves as hotel detective at the Adlon during the Nazi era in Germany, along with other jobs.

== Gallery ==
Hotel Adlon

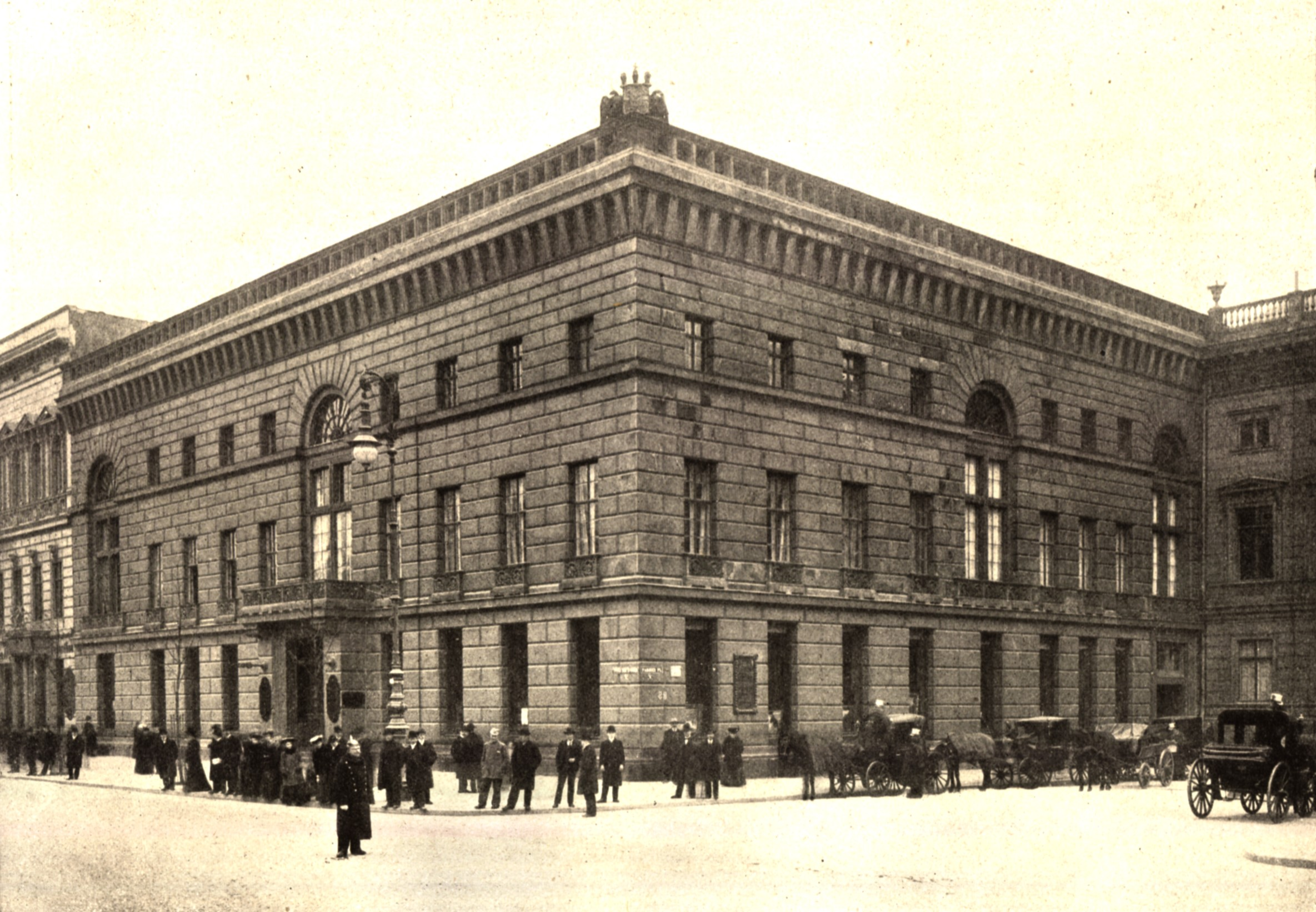
Palais Redern, about 1900

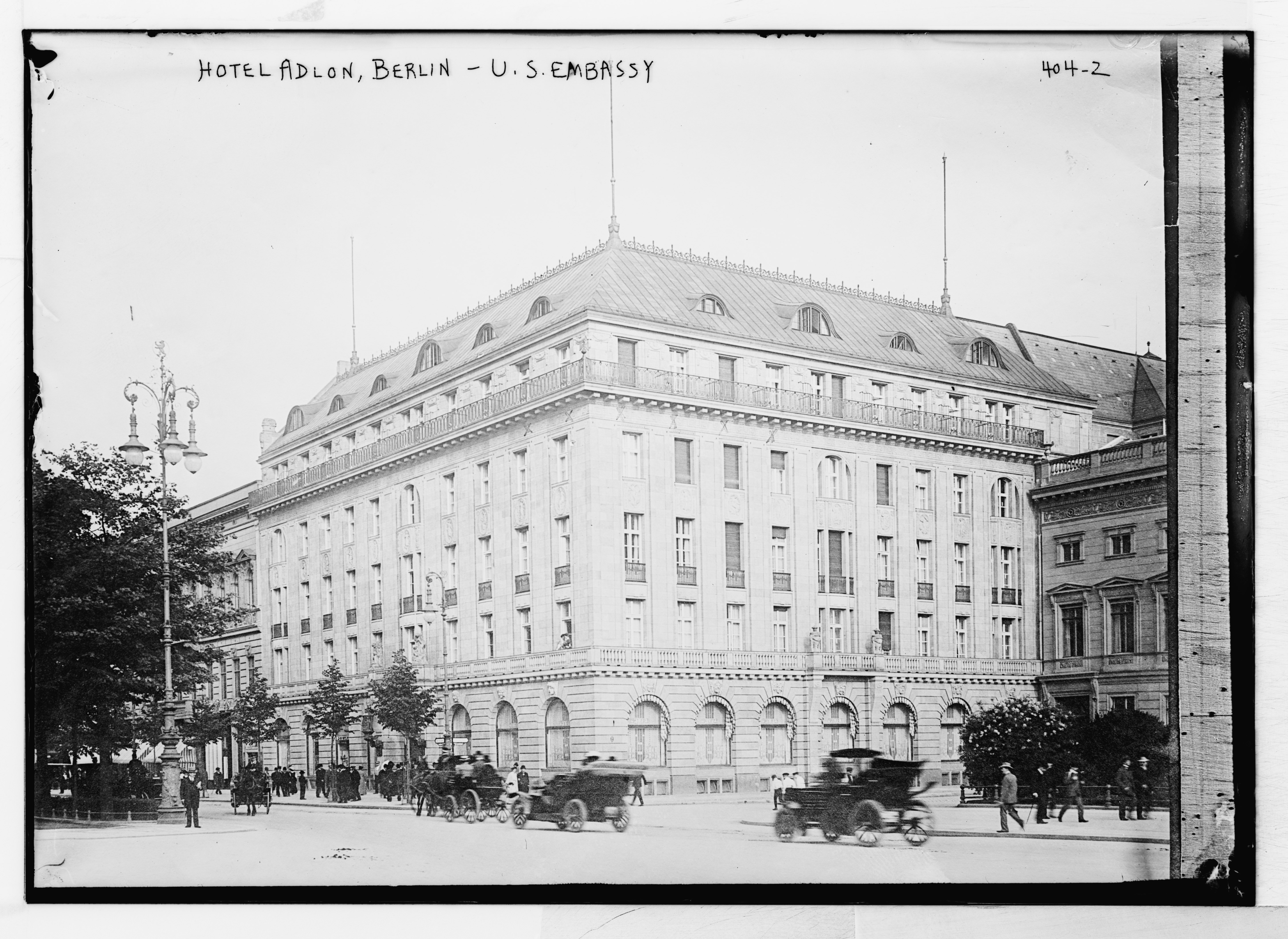
Hotel Adlon, about 1910

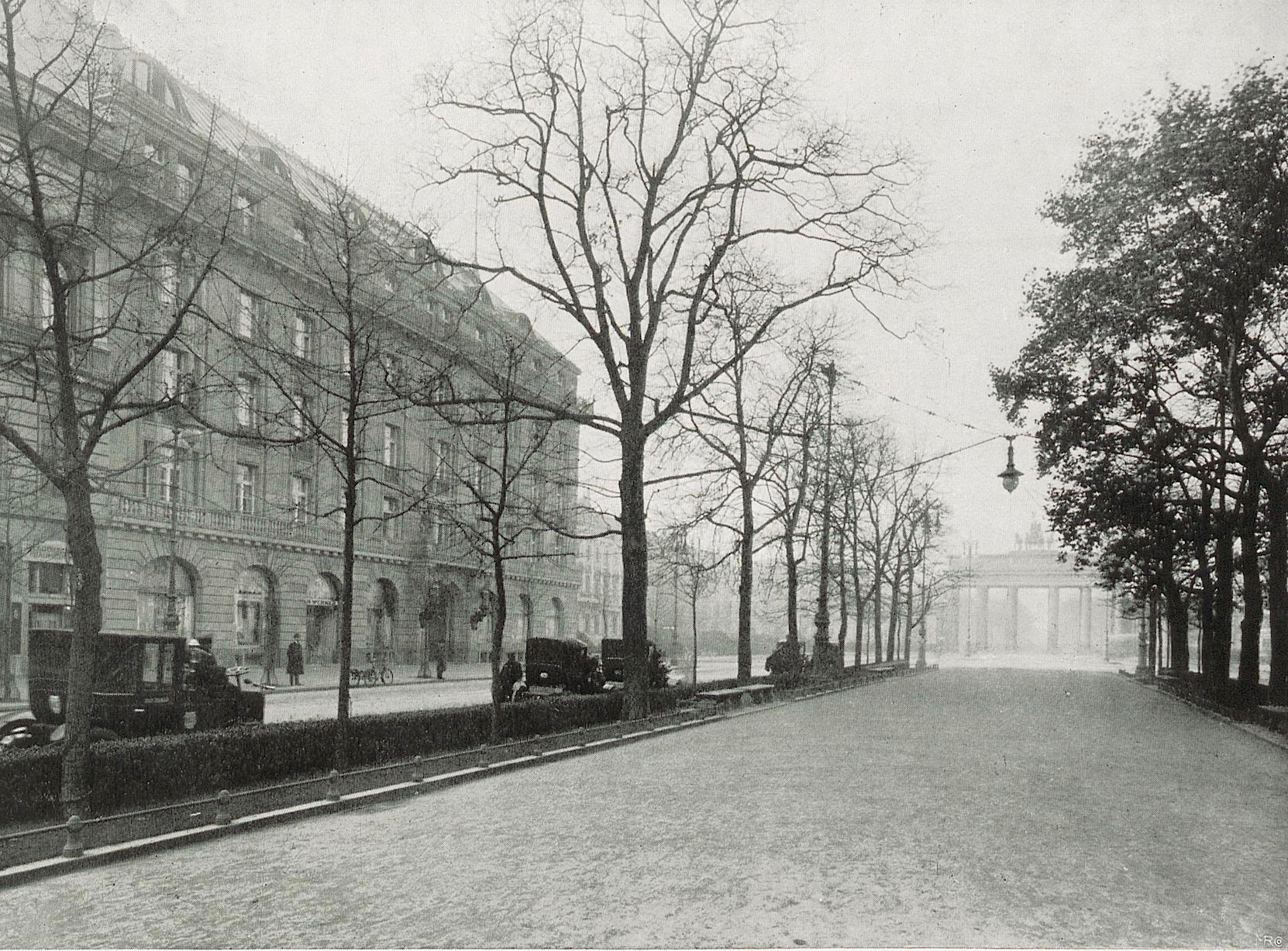
Hotel Adlon seen from Unter den Linden, about 1910

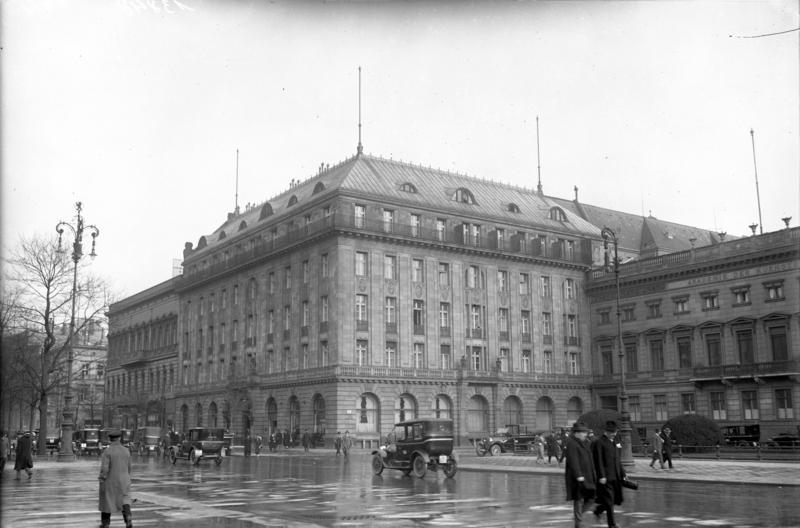
Hotel Adlon, 1926

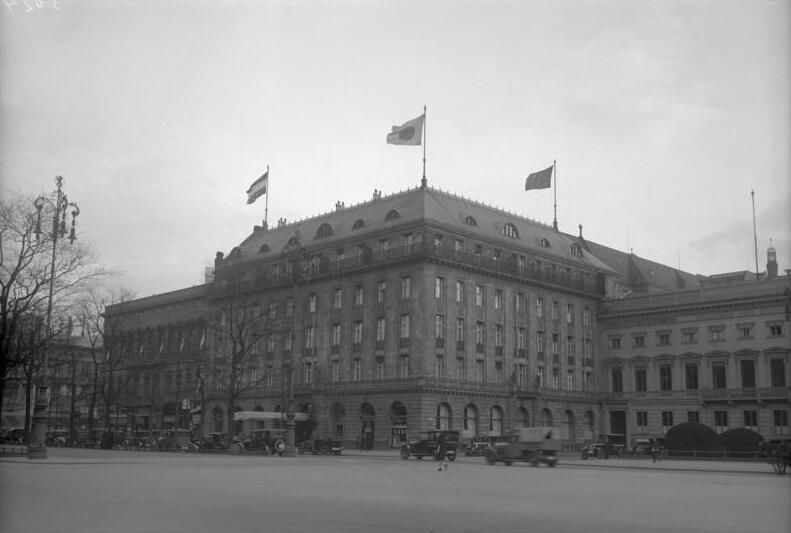
Hotel Adlon, 1927

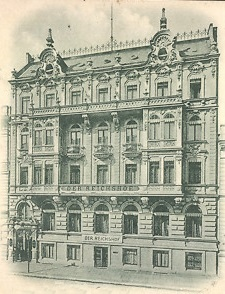
Hotel Reichshof, 70a Wilhelmstrasse, 1889, before being integrated into the Hotel Adlon in 1907

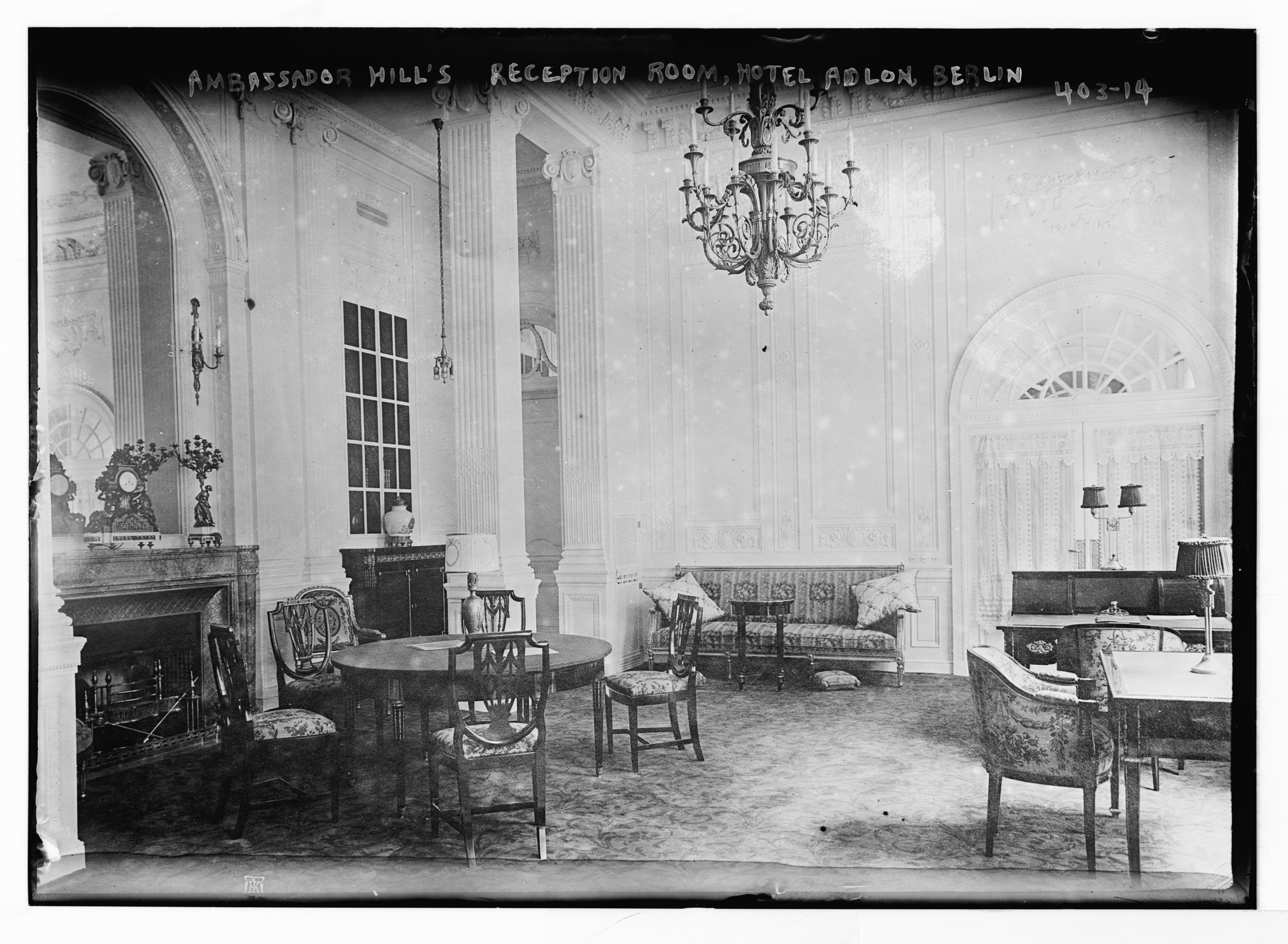
A reception room in the Hotel Adlon, about 1910

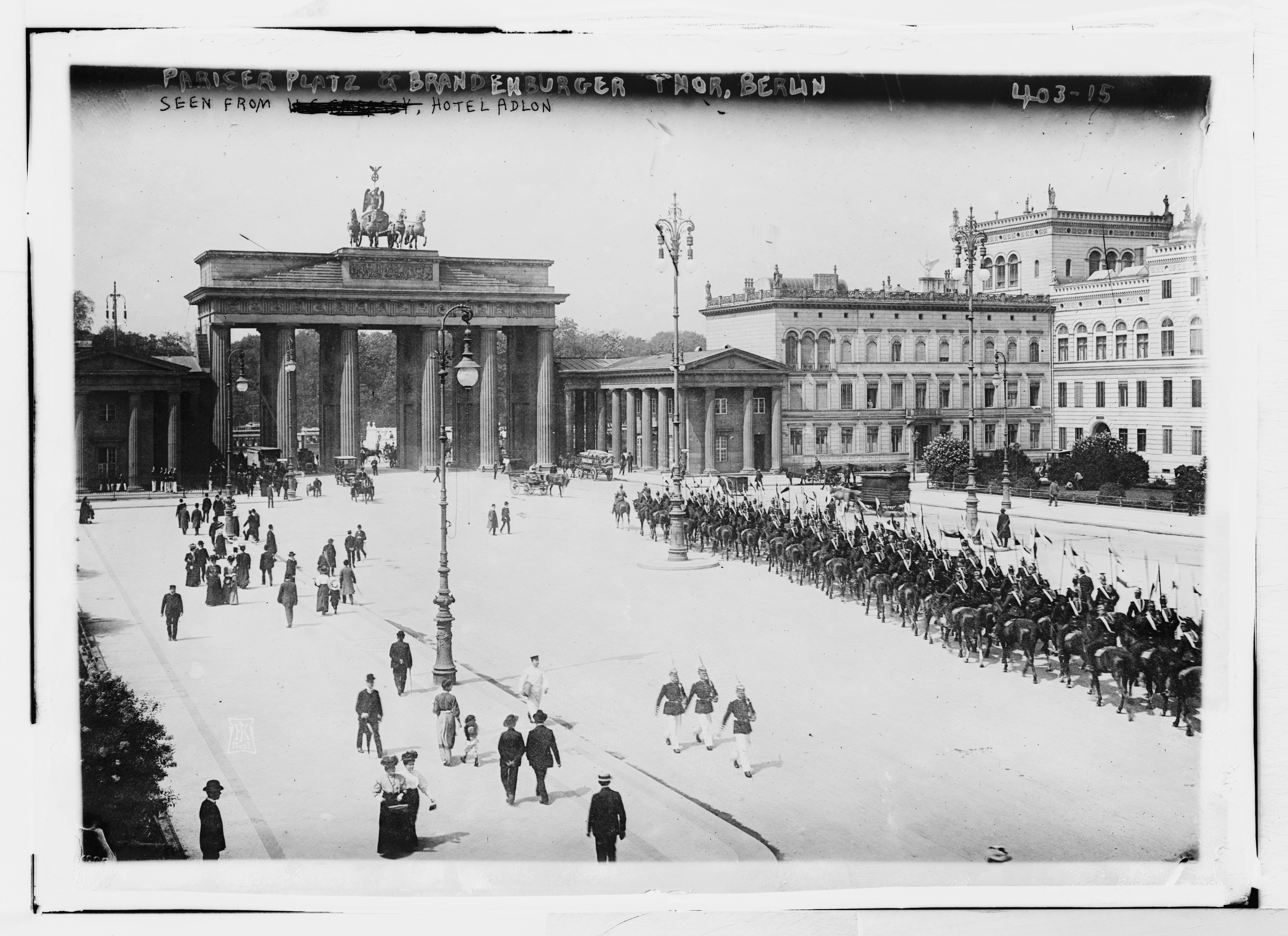
Pariser Platz seen from Hotel Adlon, about 1910

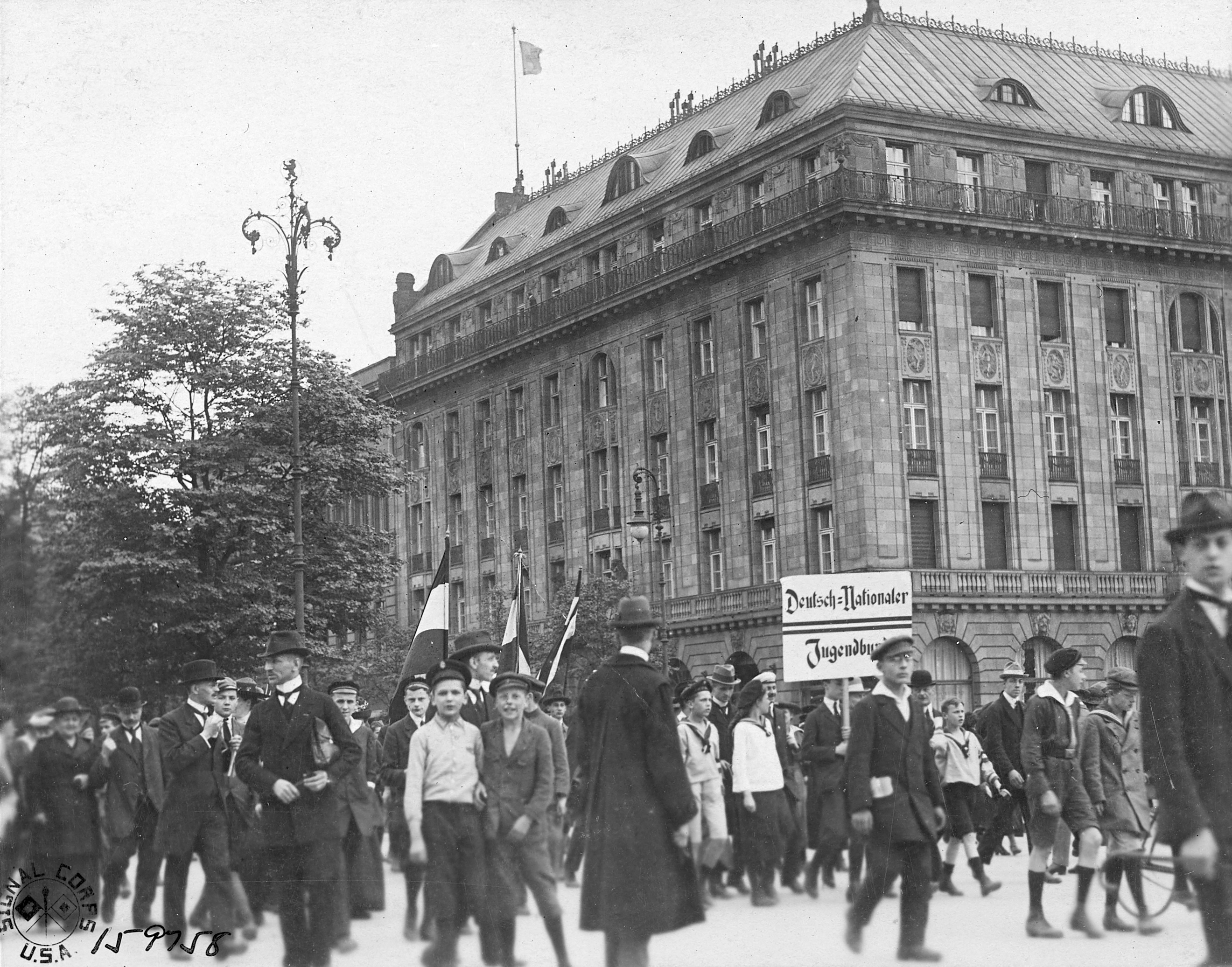
A demonstration against the peace terms following World War I passes the Adlon, where the Allied delegations were staying, May 14, 1919.

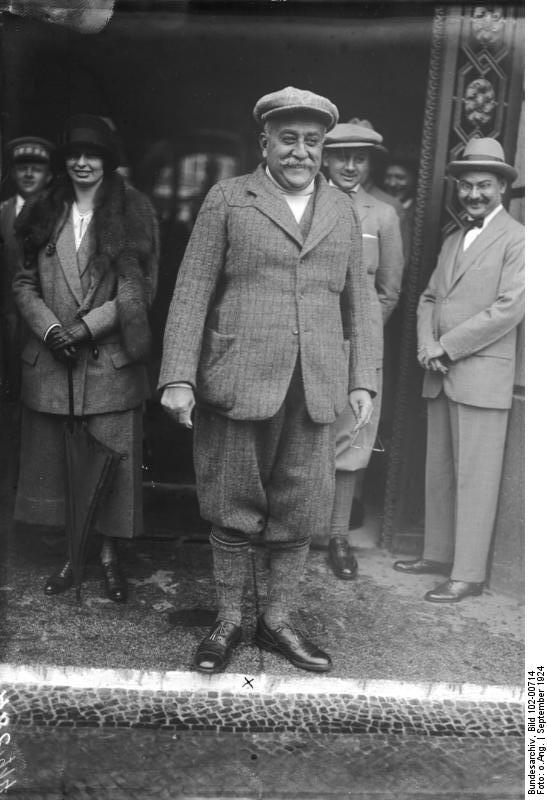
Maharao Khengarji III at the Adlon, September 1924

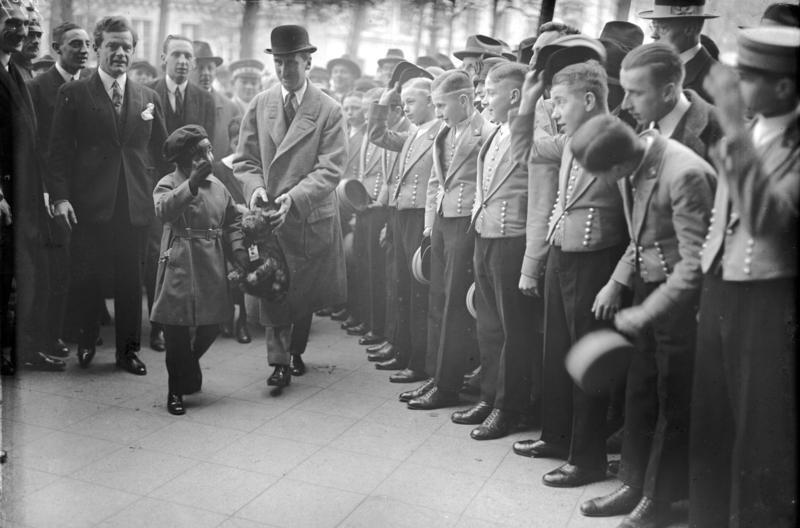
Jackie Coogan at the Adlon, October 1924

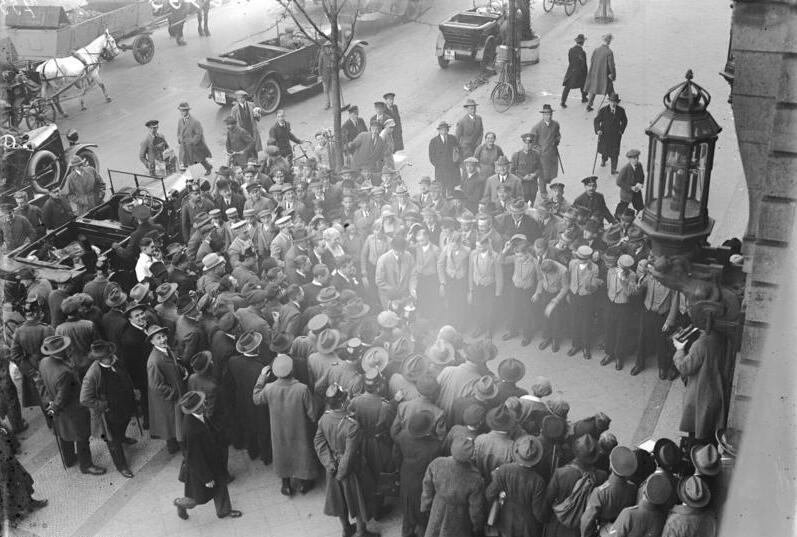
Jackie Coogan at the Adlon, October 1924

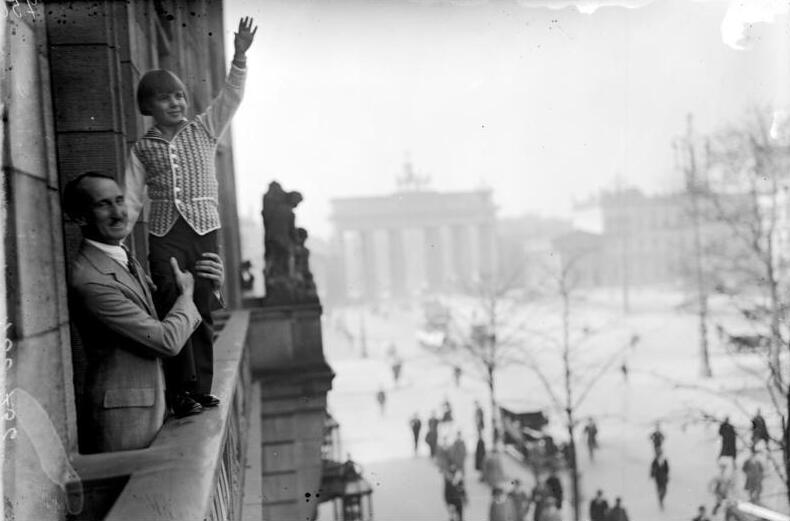
Jackie Coogan at the Adlon, October 1924

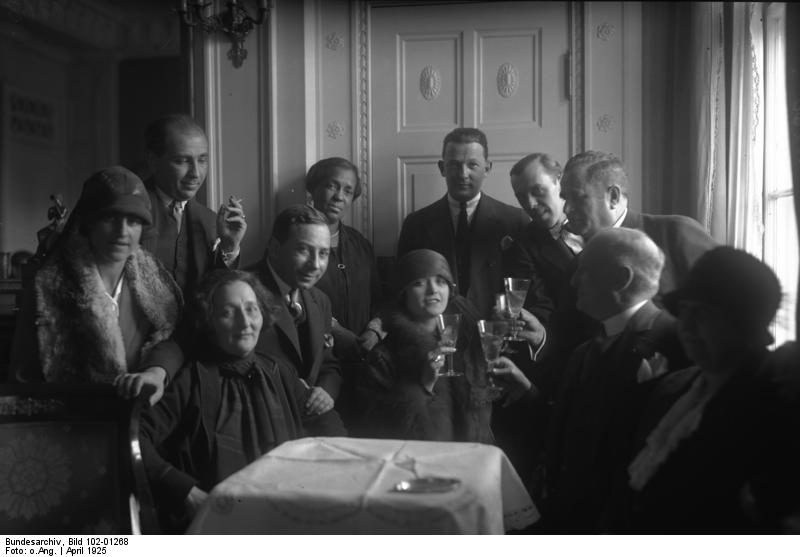
Movie star Pola Negri meets with film directors at the Adlon, April 1925

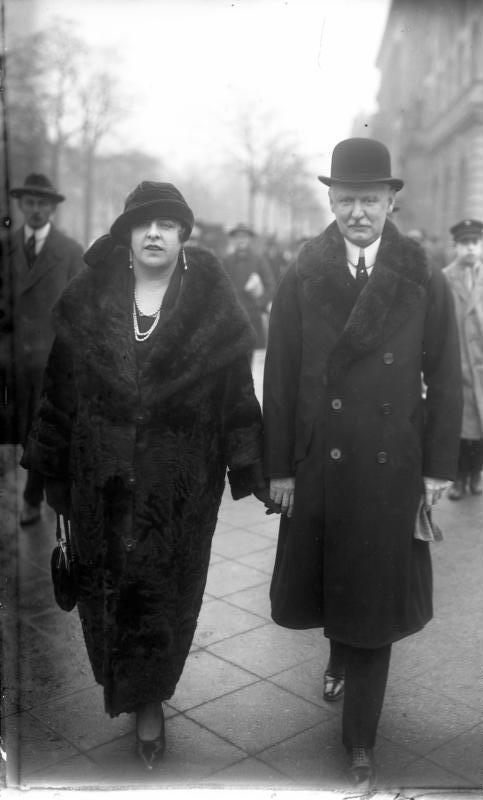
Louis and Hedda Adlon, 1926

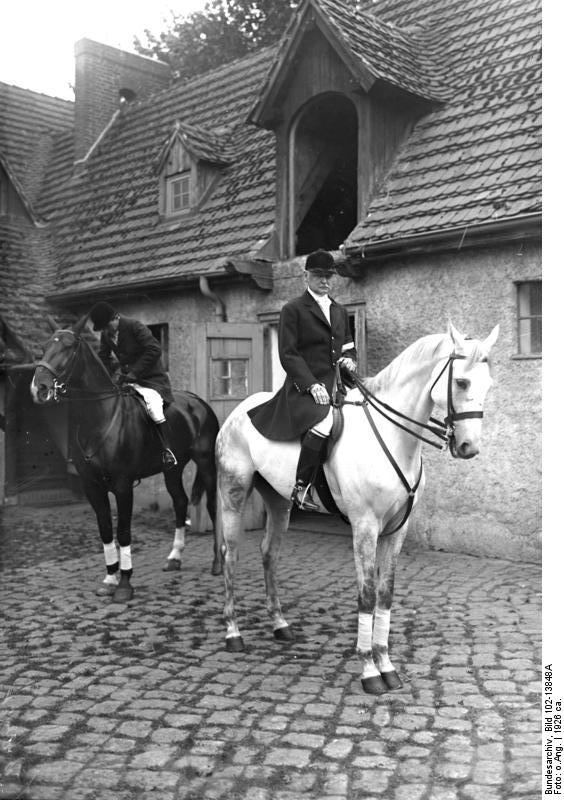
Louis Adlon riding at his country estate, 1926

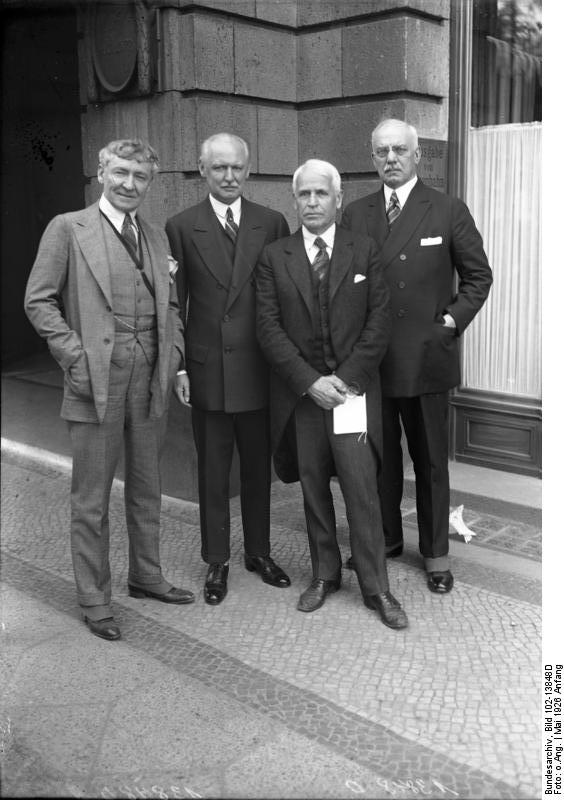
Louis Adlon with visiting American hoteliers, including Ellsworth Milton Statler, 3 May 1926

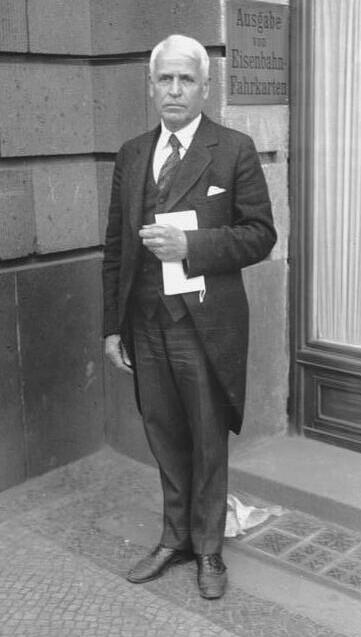
Ellsworth Milton Statler, in front of the Adlon

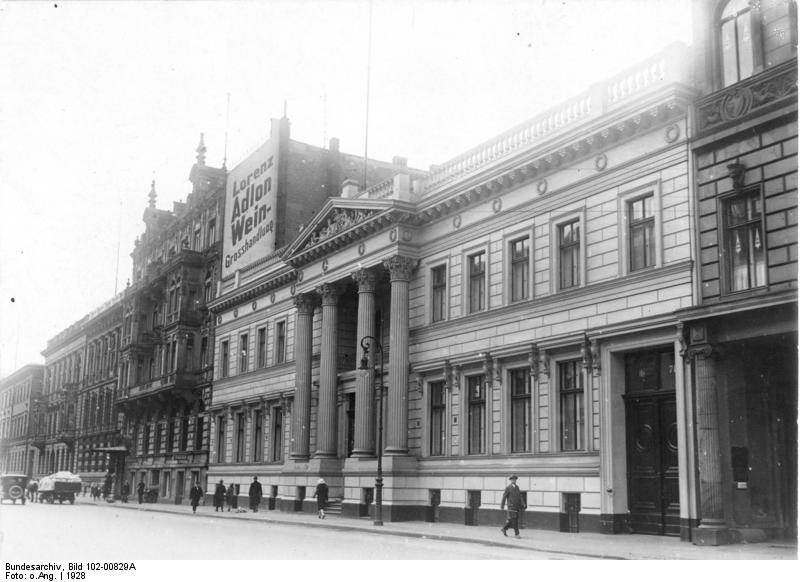
British Embassy, 1928, with the 70a Wilhelmstrasse wing of the Adlon on the left

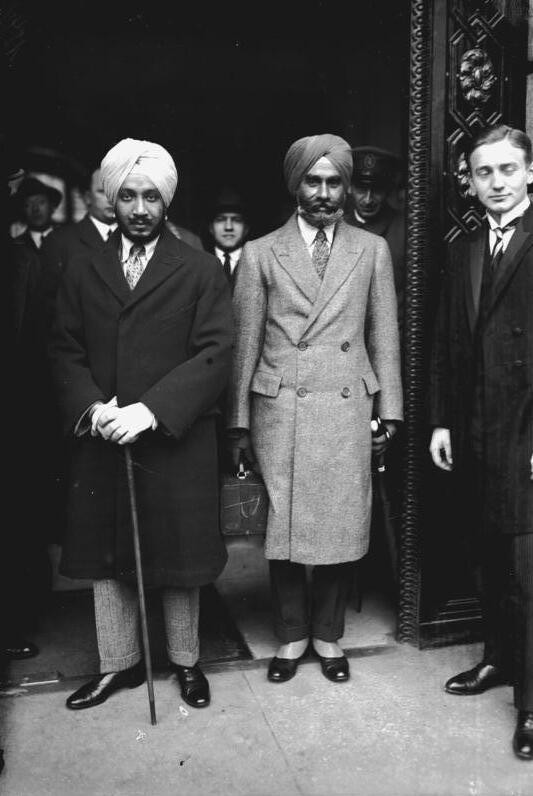
Maharaja Bhupinder Singh of Patiala at the Adlon, June 1928

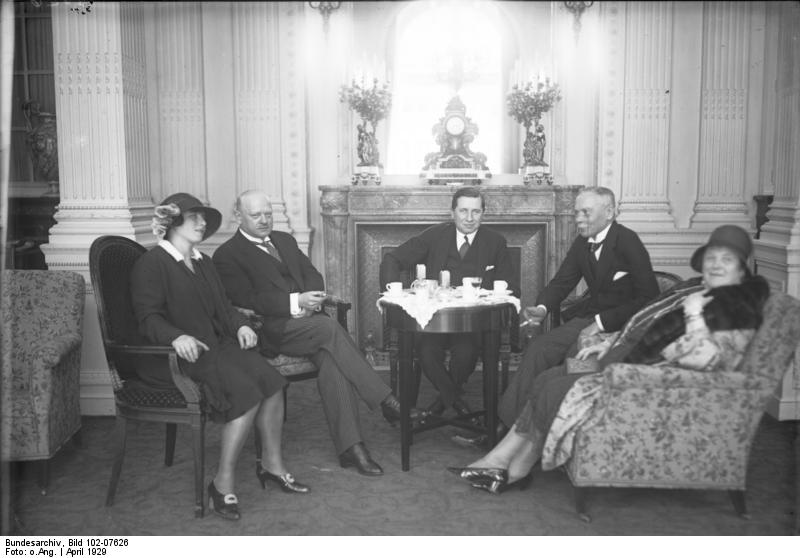
Foreign Minister Gustav Stresemann (2nd from L) and Hans von Seeckt (2nd from R) at tea with the Austrian Ambassador and his new wife at the Adlon, April 1929

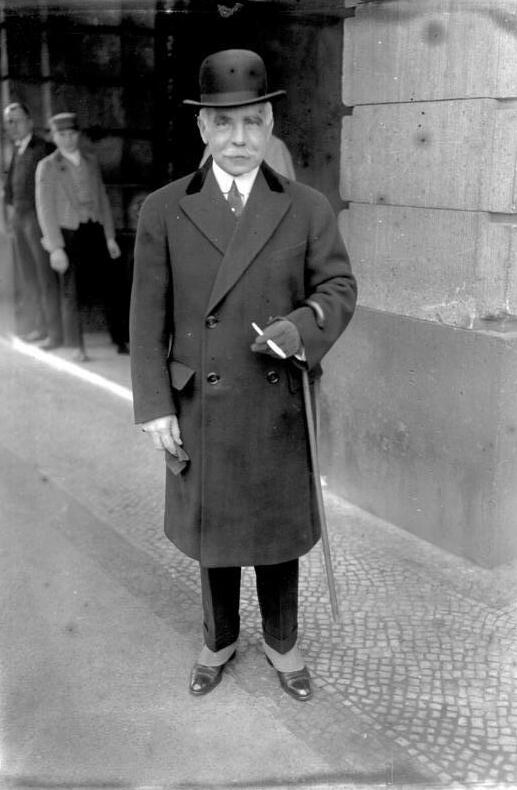
American banker Otto Hermann Kahn in front of Hotel Adlon, April 1929

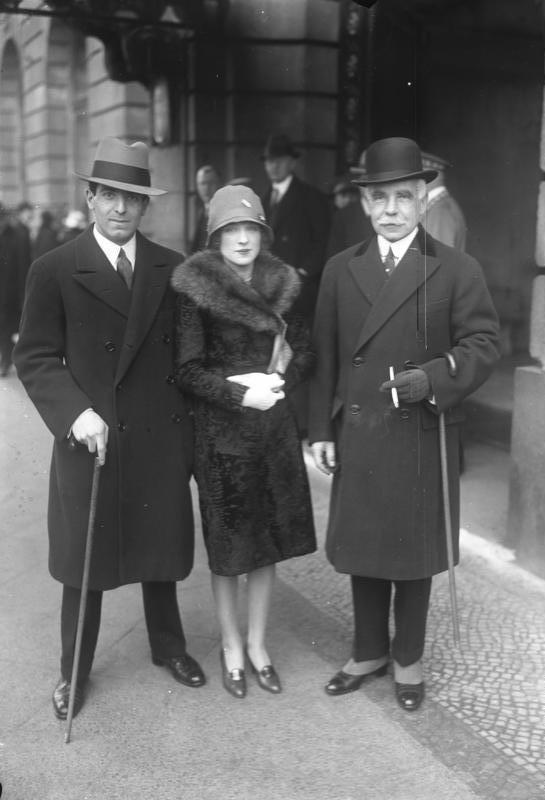
Roger Wolfe Kahn, Hannah Williams and Otto Hermann Kahn in front of Hotel Adlon, 1929

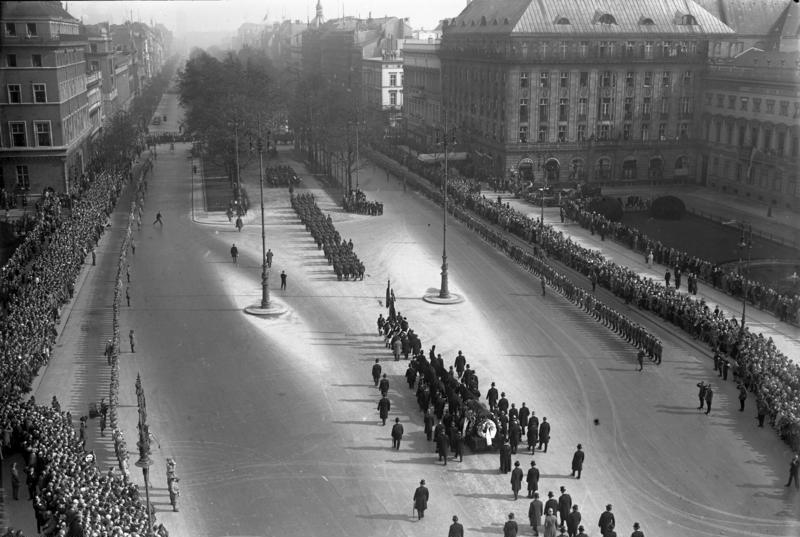
Funeral of German Foreign Minister Gustav Stresemann, October 6, 1929

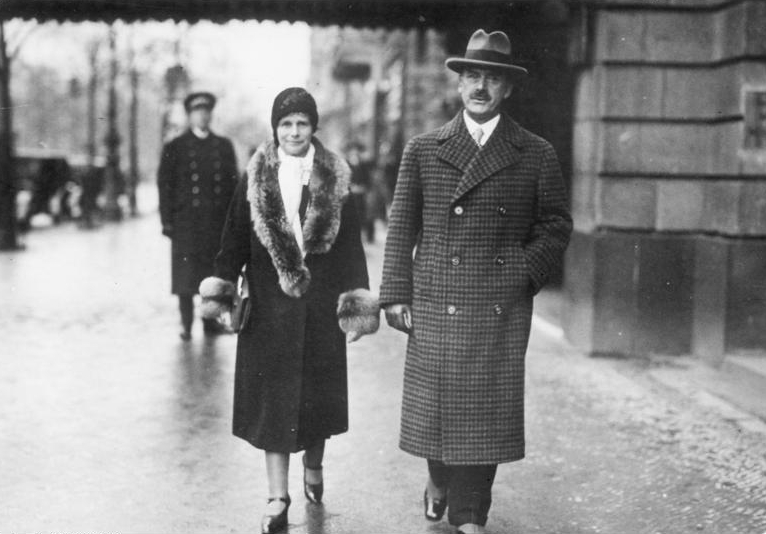
Thomas Mann at the Adlon, 1929

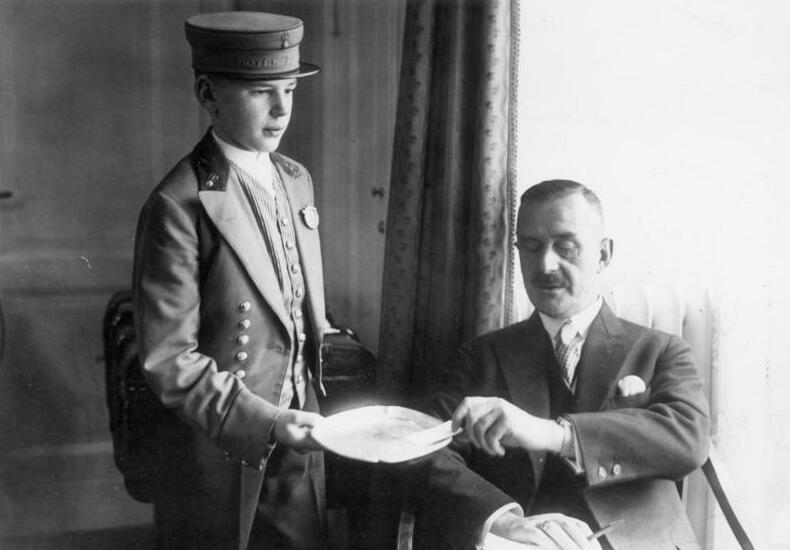
Thomas Mann at the Adlon, 1929

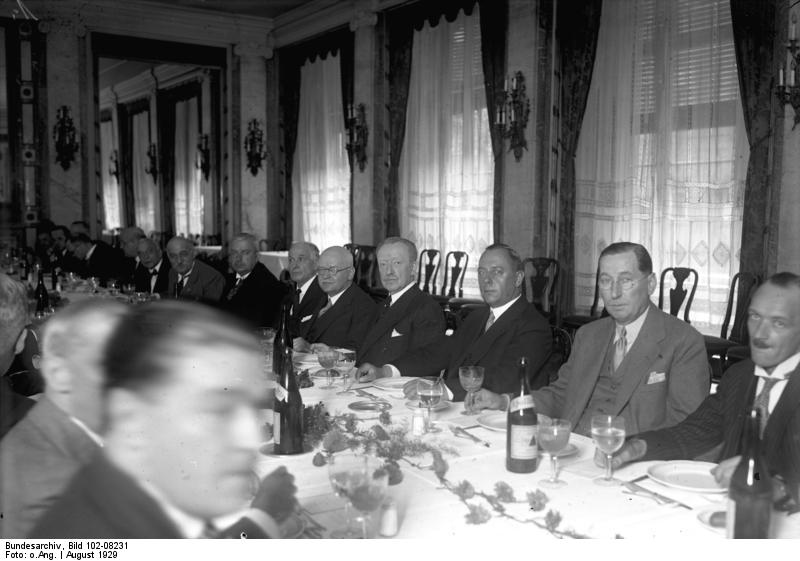
Gala dinner given by former German Chancellor Hans Luther, August 1929

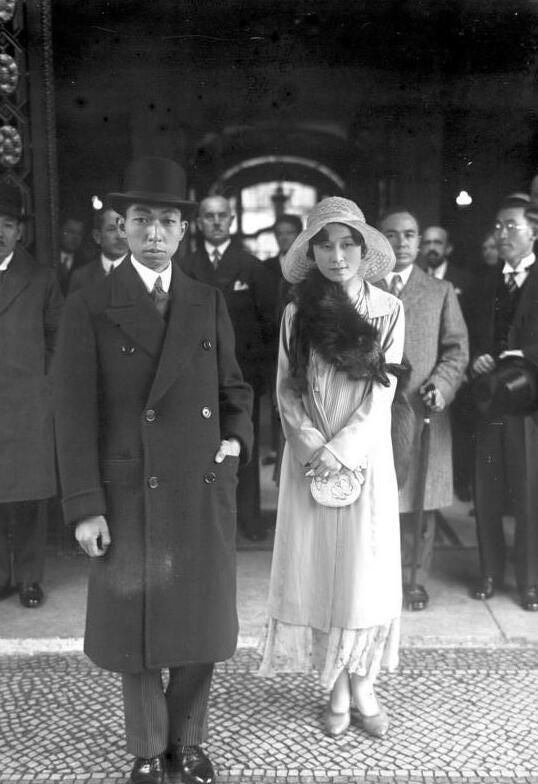
Nobuhito, Prince Takamatsu and his wife, Kikuko, Princess Takamatsu, at the Adlon, August, 1930

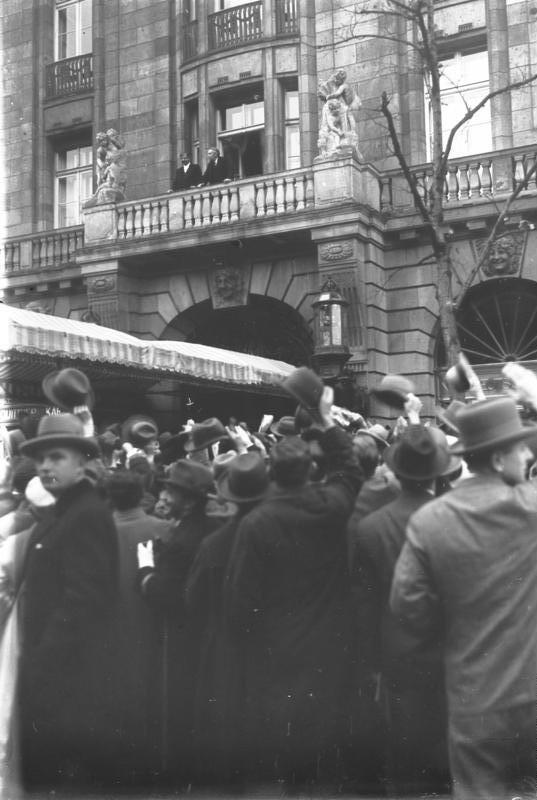
French Premier Pierre Laval and Foreign Minister Aristide Briand at the Adlon, September 1, 1931

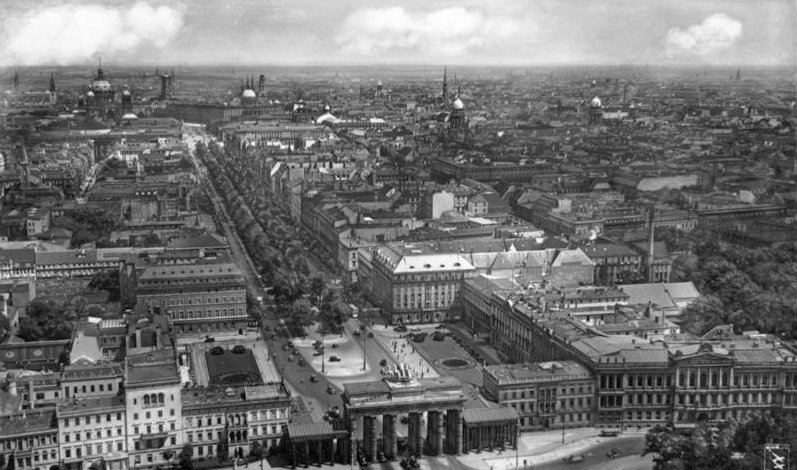
Aerial view of Unter den Linden, with Hotel Adlon at center, October 1931

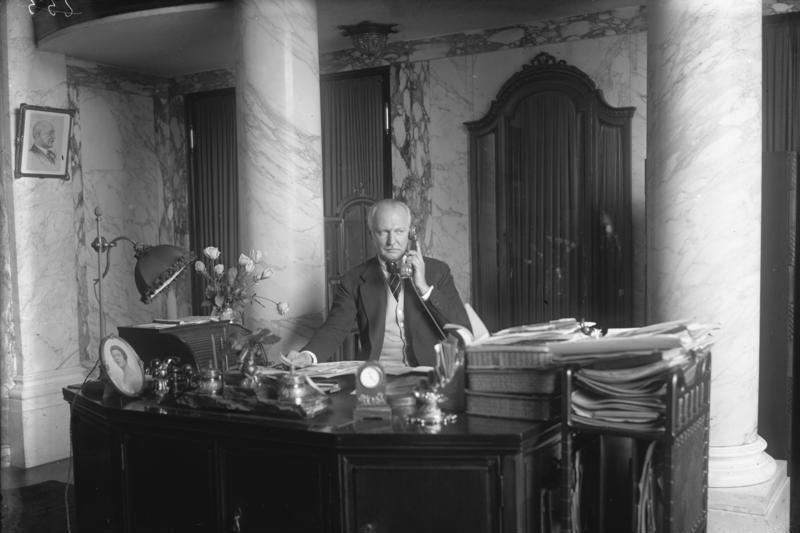
Louis Adlon in his office, 1932

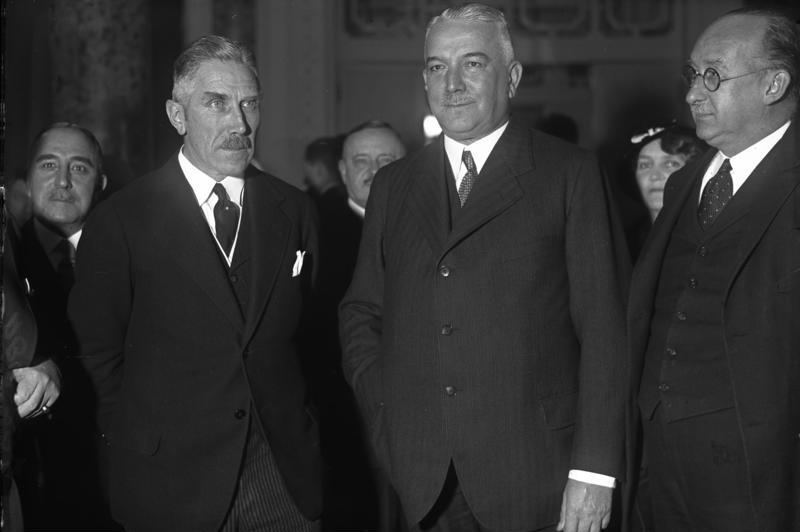
Chancellor Franz von Papen and Minister of Foreign Affairs Konstantin von Neurath speak at the Foreign Press Ball at the Adlon, November 1932

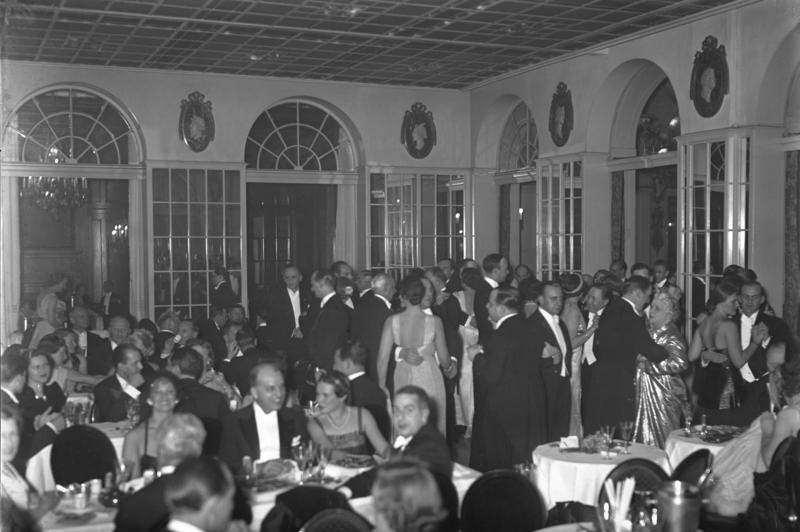
Foreign Press Ball at the Adlon, 1930s

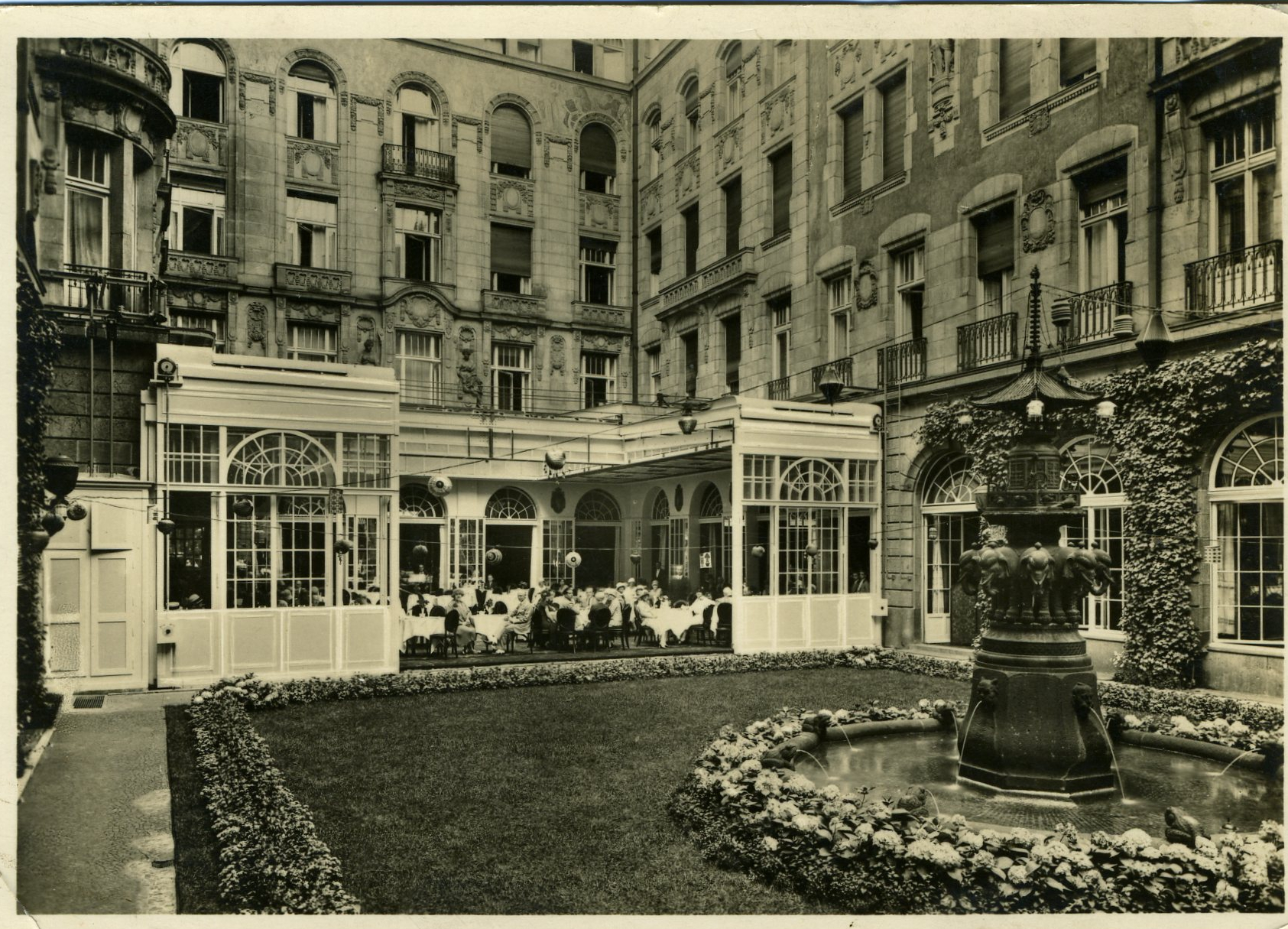
The Goethe Garden of the Hotel Adlon, 1930s

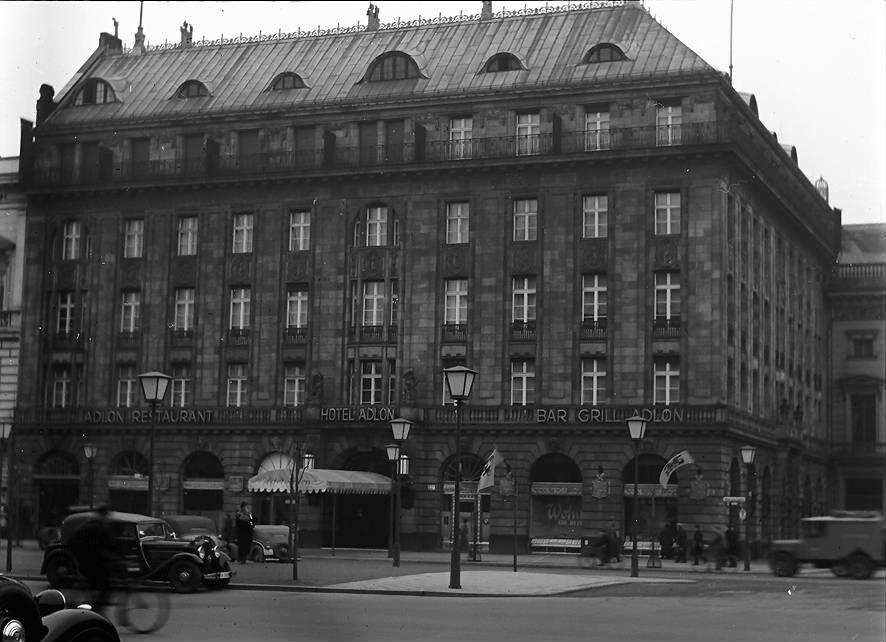
Hotel Adlon, 1936

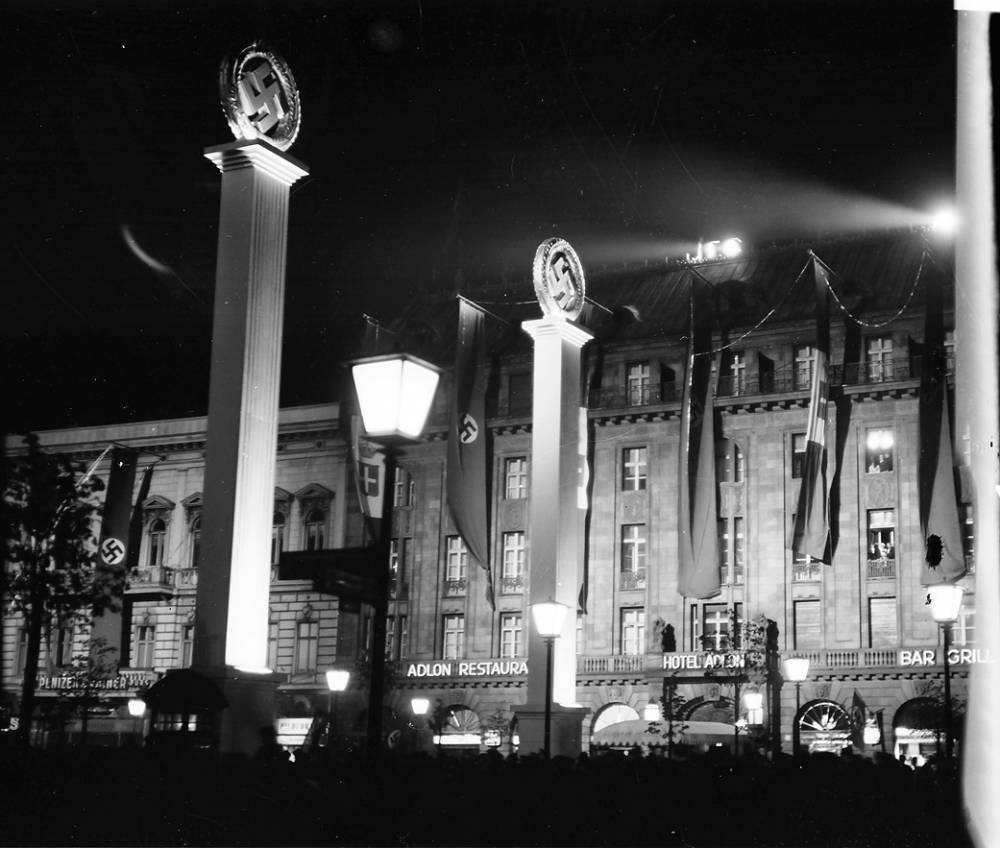
Hotel Adlon during the state visit of Benito Mussolini, 1937

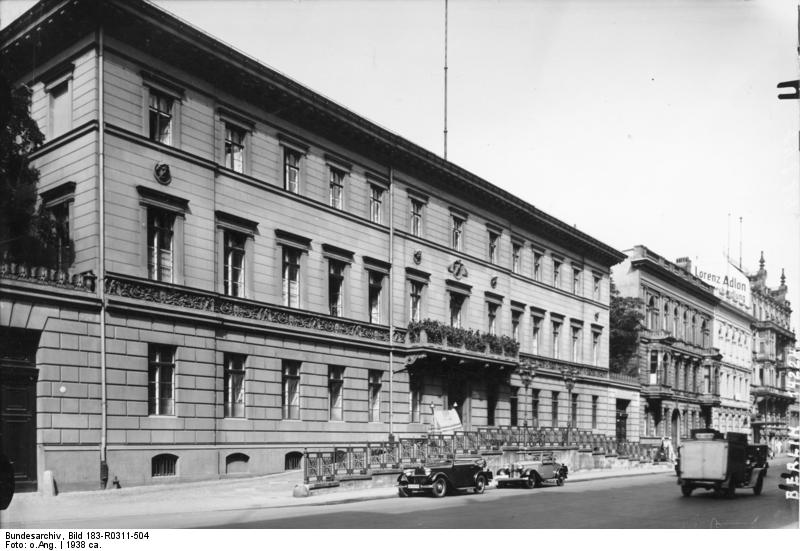
Reich Ministry of Food and Agriculture, 1938. The 70a Wilhelmstrasse wing of the Adlon, sold as government office space, is on the right.

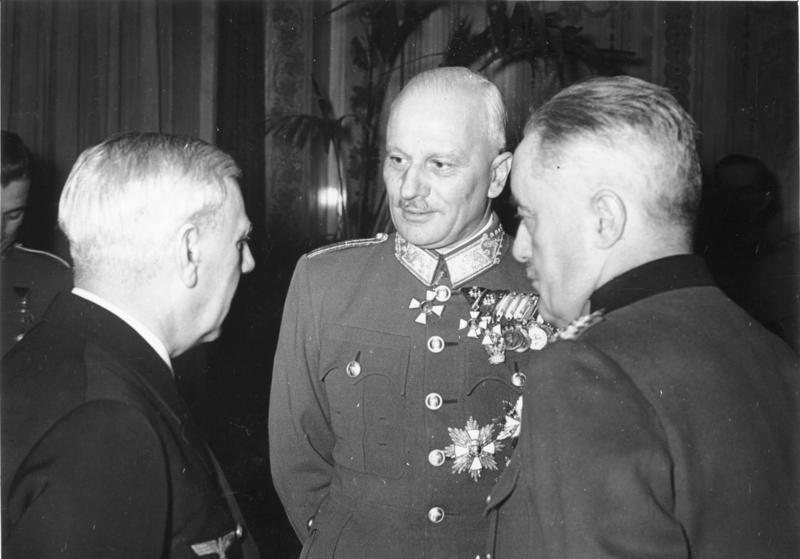
L to R: Abwehr chief Wilhelm Canaris, Hungarian Defense Minister Károly Bartha and Edmund Glaise-Horstenau at the Adlon, January 23, 1941

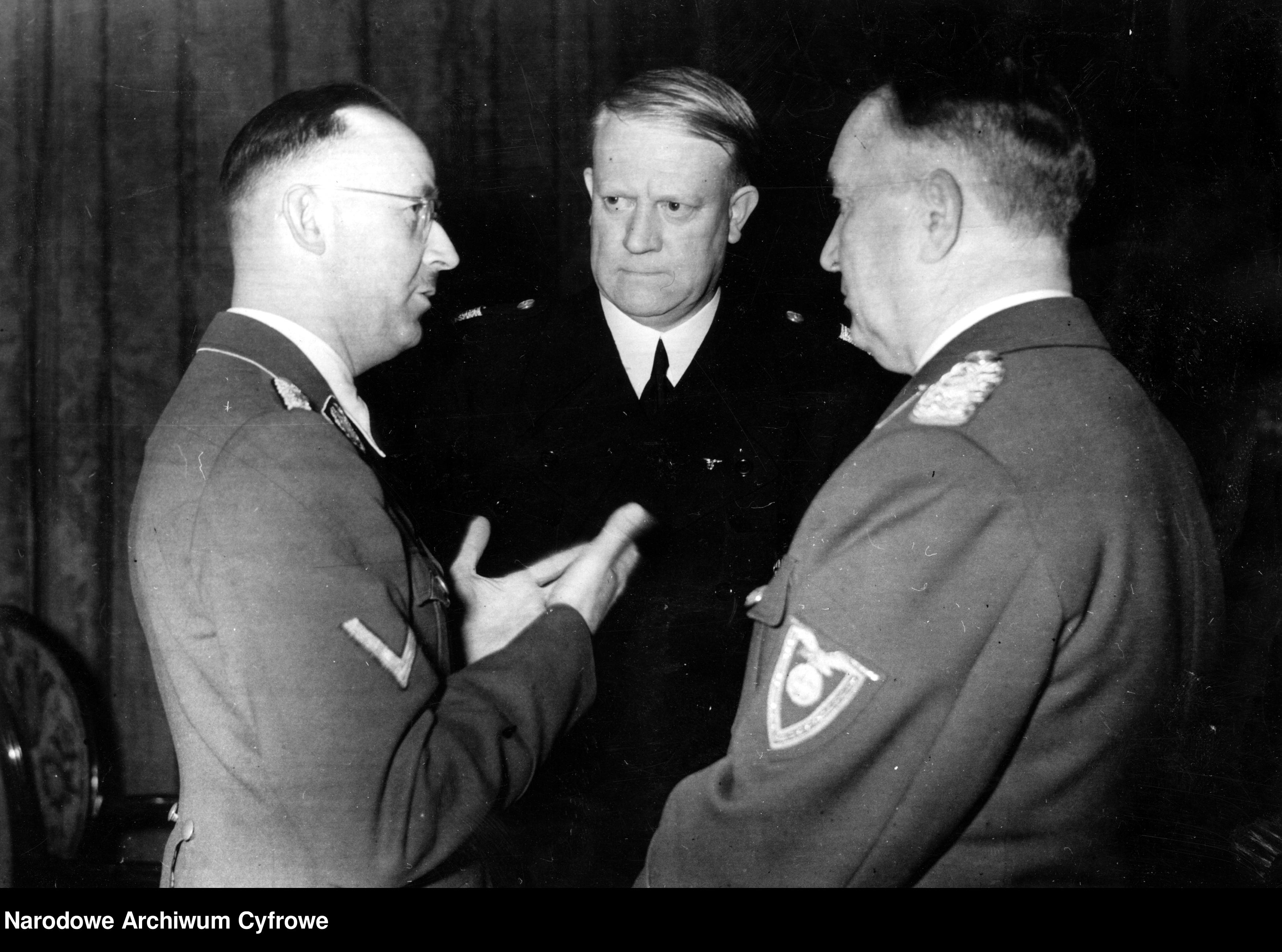
L to R: Heinrich Himmler, Norwegian Prime Minister Vidkun Quisling and Norwegian Minister of Domestic Affairs Albert Viljam Hagelin at the Adlon, February 14, 1942

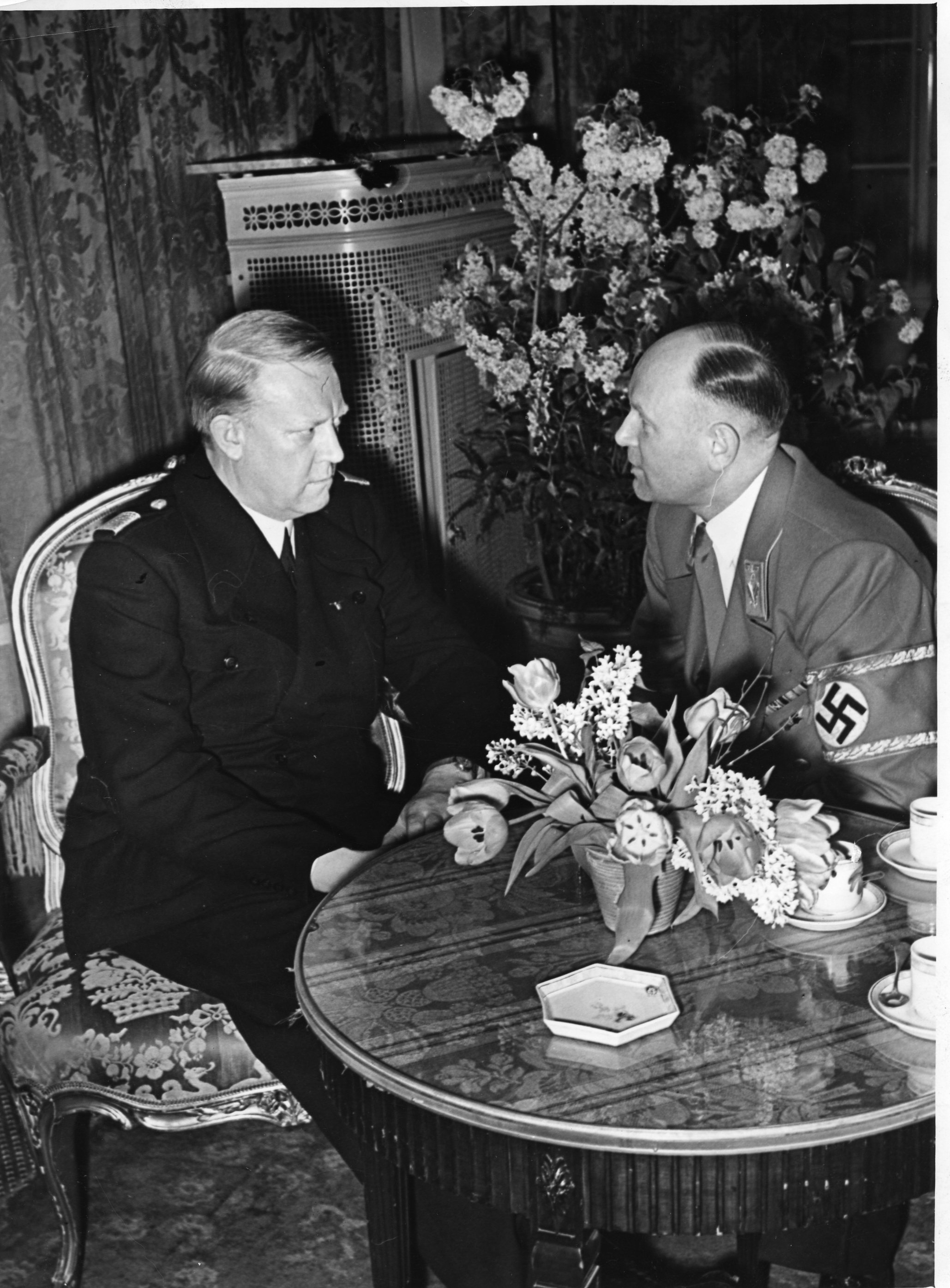
Vidkun Quisling (left) meets with Dr. Hans Draeger, President of the Norwegian Liaison Office in Berlin, at the Adlon, February 14, 1942.

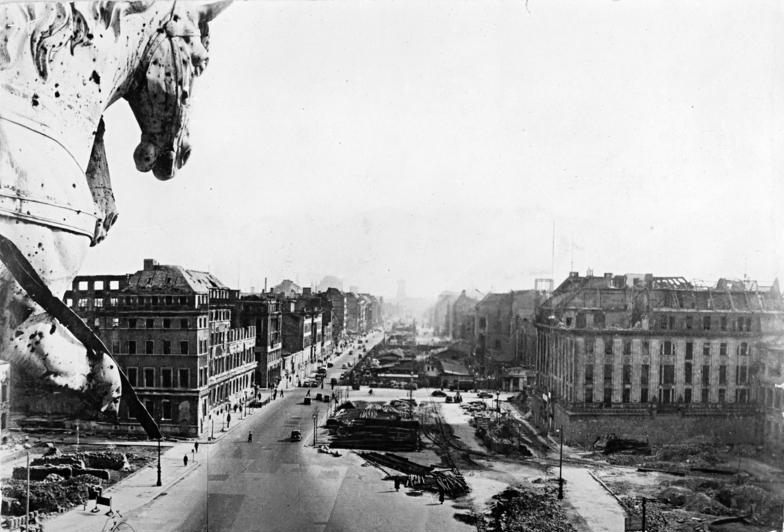
Ruined Pariser Platz in 1950, gutted Hotel Adlon on the right

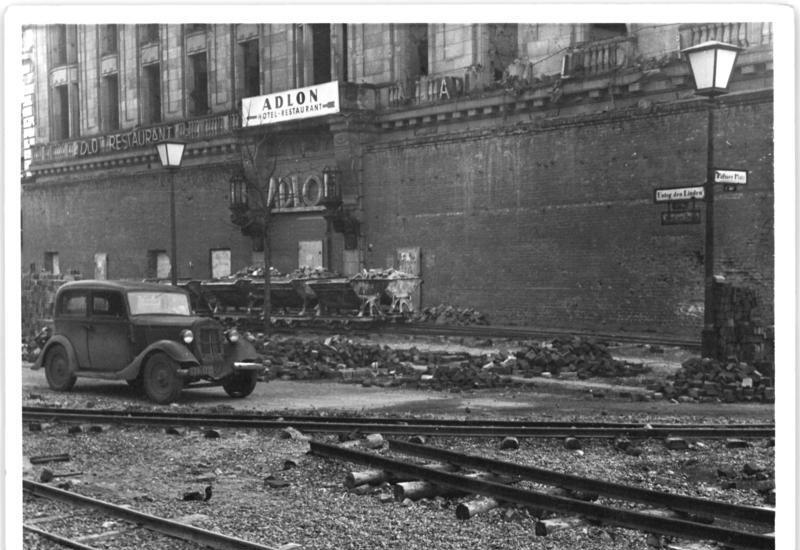
Hotel Adlon ruins, 1950, showing the protective wall built around the ground floor in the closing months of World War II

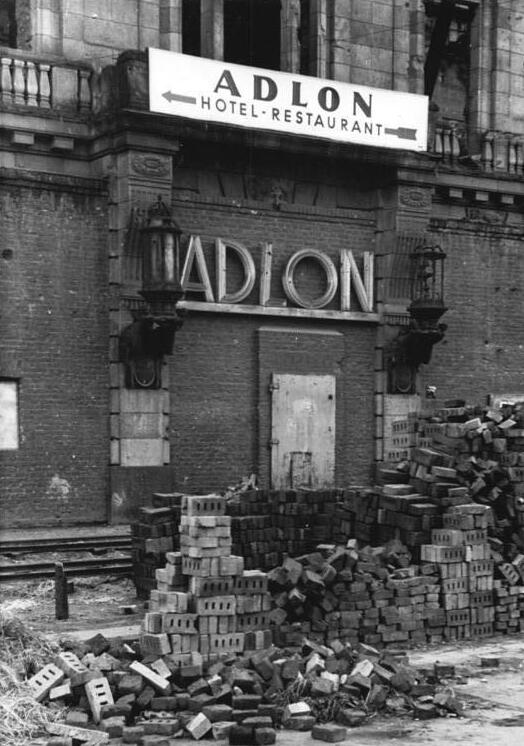
The ruined main entrance to the Hotel Adlon, 1950

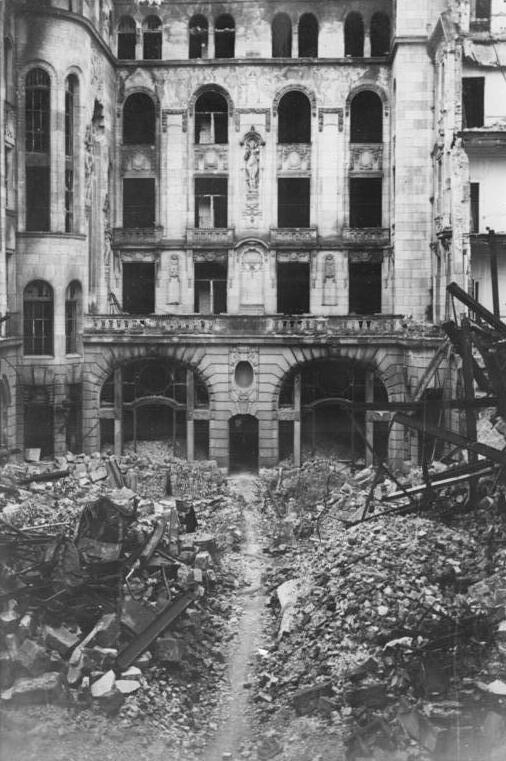
Ruined courtyard of the Adlon, 1950

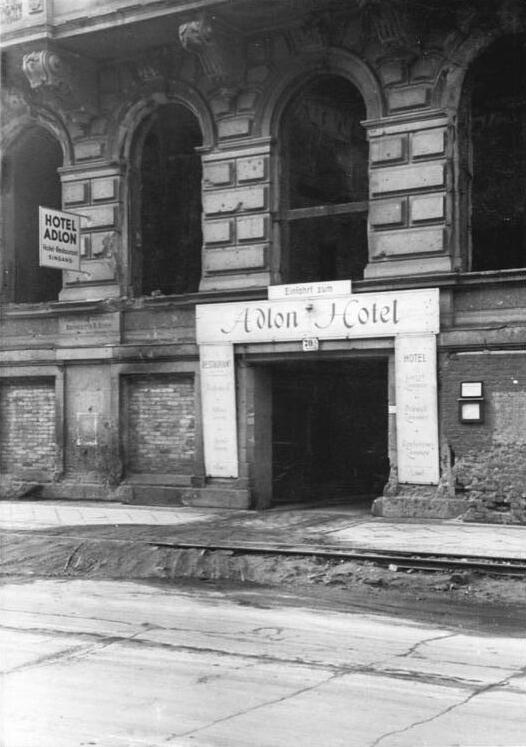
Entrance to the makeshift Hotel Adlon through the surviving 70a Wilhelmstrasse wing, 1950

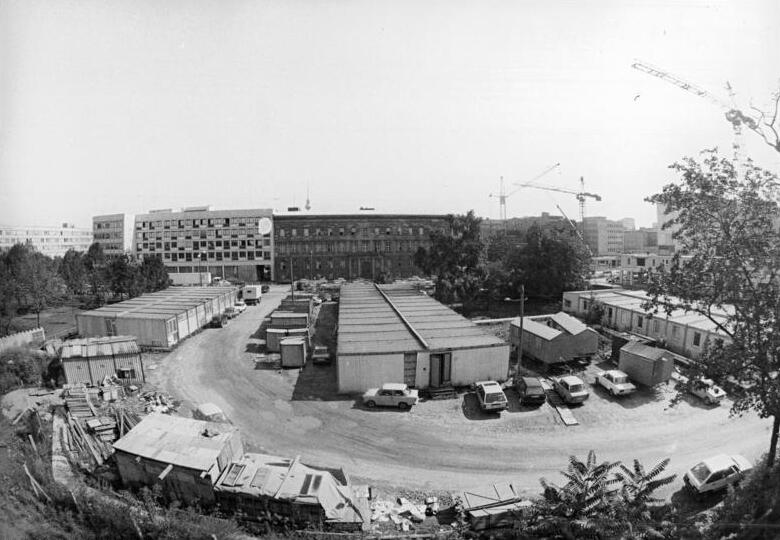
Hotel Adlon site before construction began, 1990

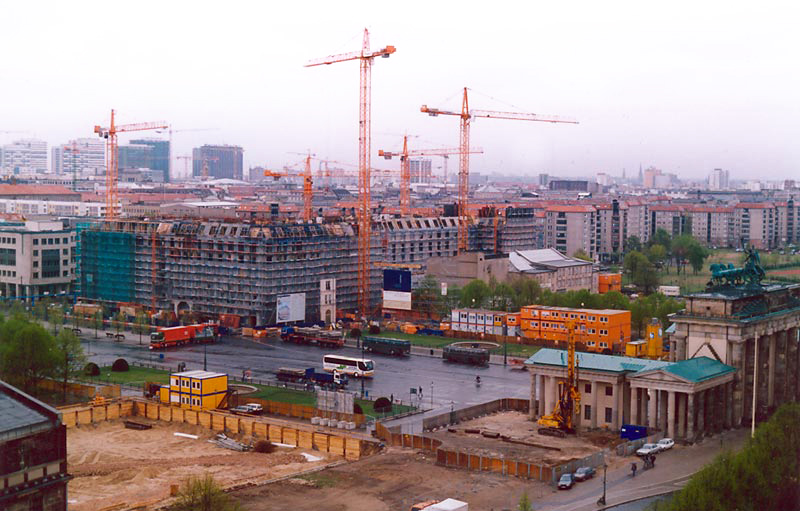
Hotel Adlon Kempinski under construction, 1995

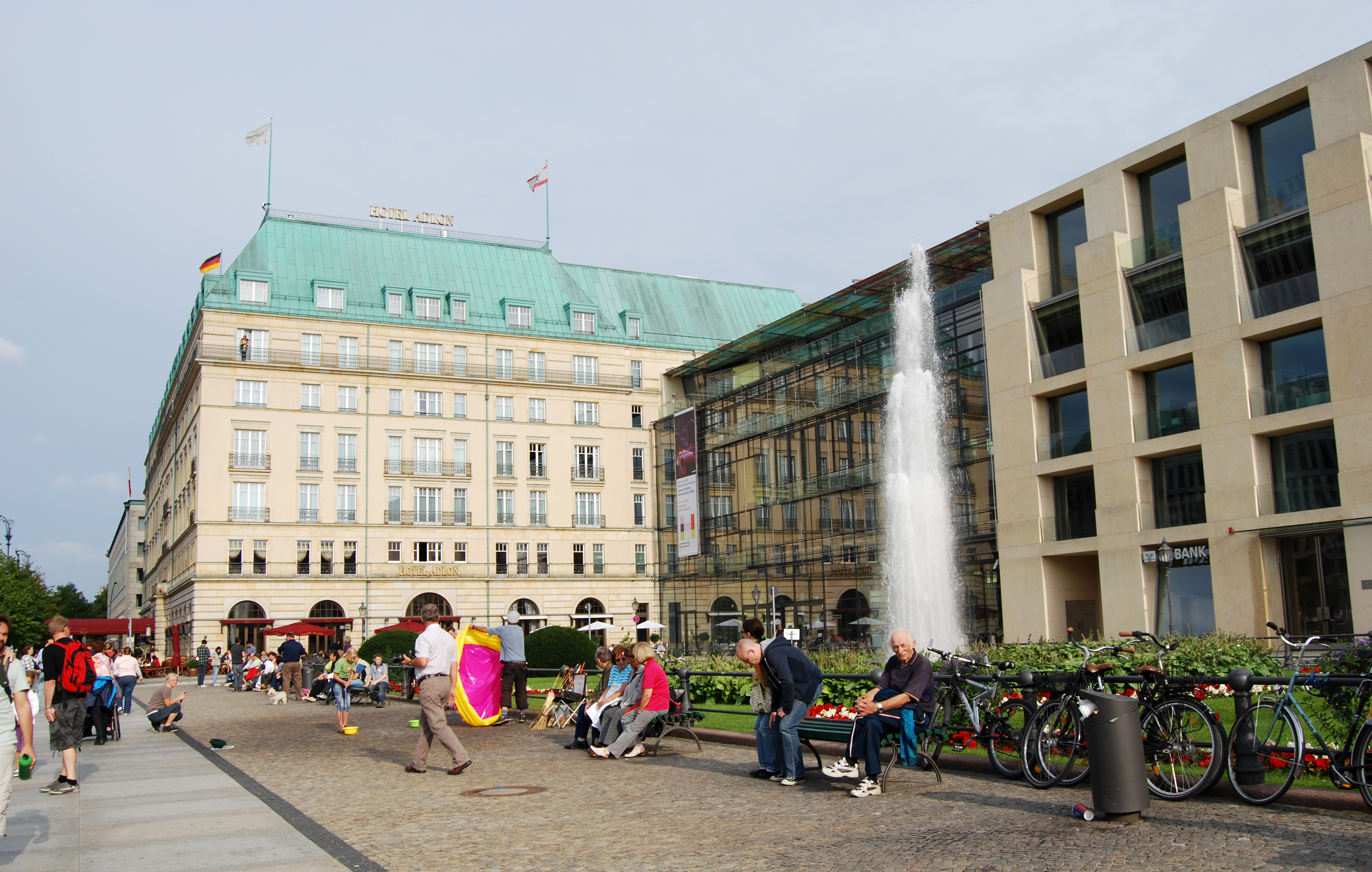
Hotel Adlon Kempinski, 2011

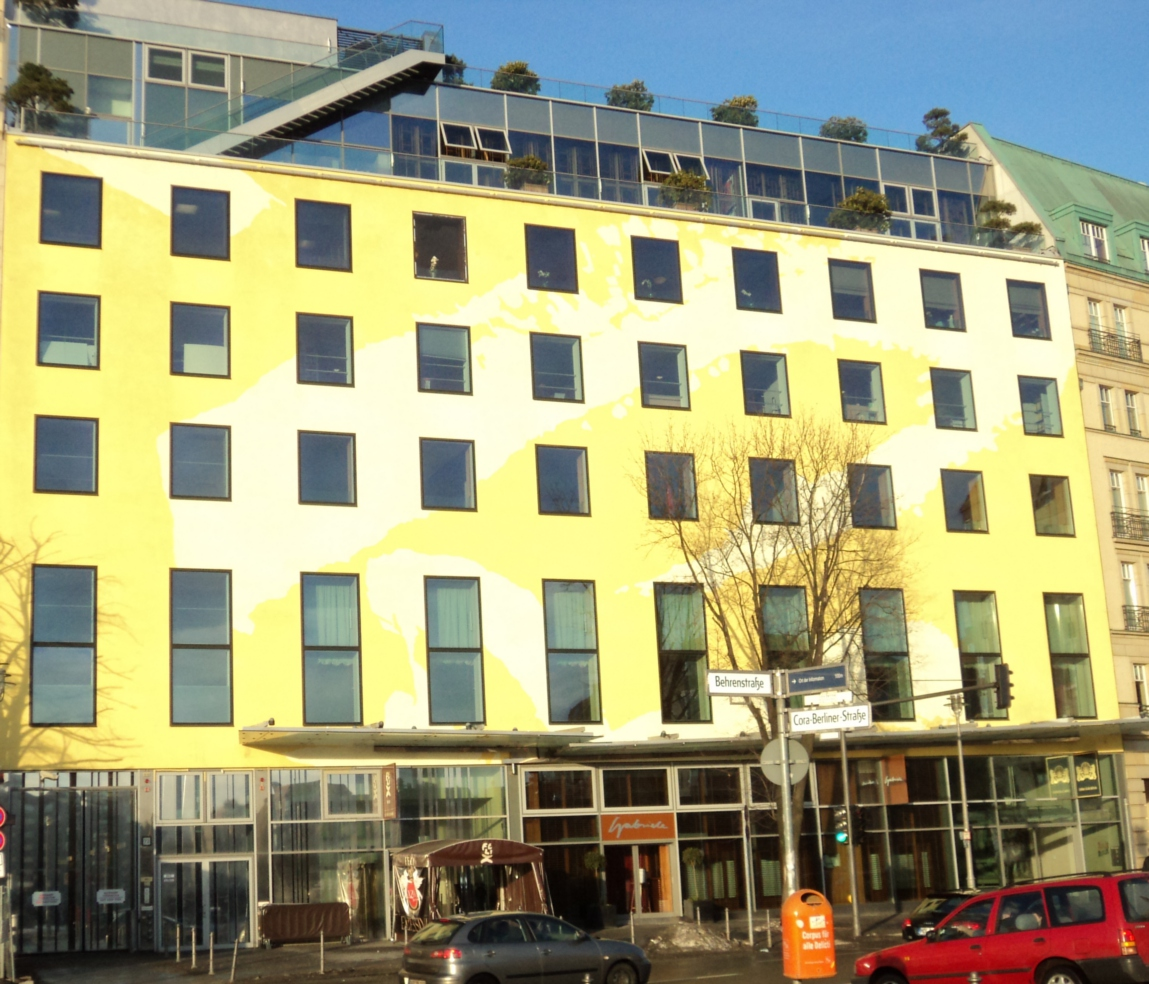
Adlon Palais wing, facing Behrenstraße, 2011

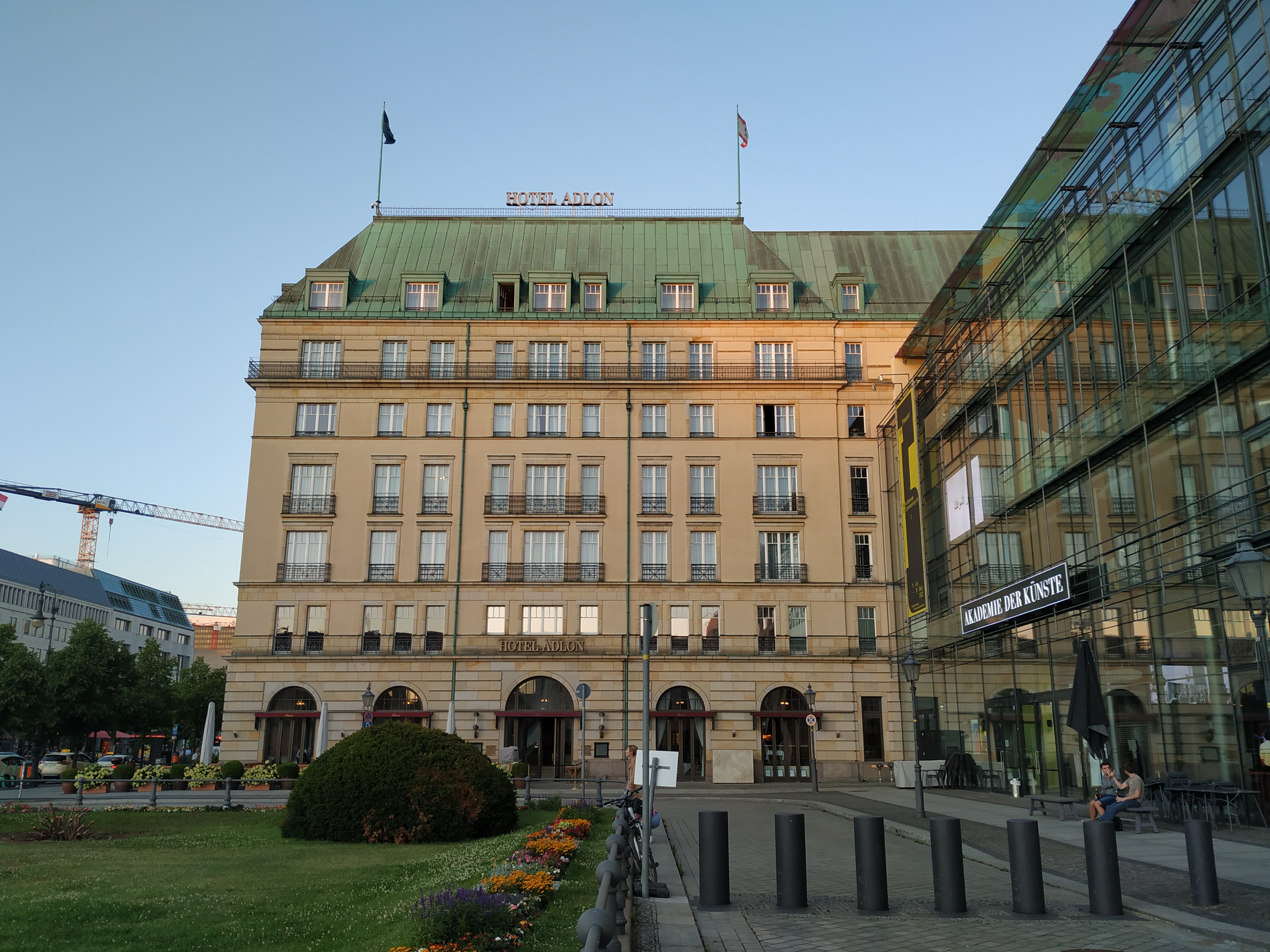
Hotel Adlon Kempinski, July 2022

== See also ==
- Lorenz Adlon (1849–1921), German hotelier, built Hotel
- Louis Adlon (1908–1947), German-American film actor in Hollywood, grandson of Lorenz
- Hotel Adlon, German film, from book by Louis's father's second wife
- Percy Adlon (born 1935, Munich), German film producer, cousin of Louis, grandson of Lorenz
- Pamela Adlon (born 1966), American actress, daughter-in-law of Percy
