= Nelly Borgeaud =

French actress

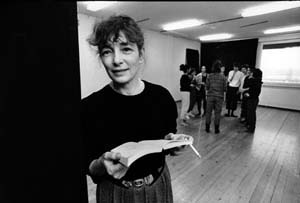
- Born: 29 November 1931; Geneva, Switzerland
- Died: 14 July 2004 (aged 72); Creuse, France
- Occupation: Actress
- Years active: 1955–2001

Nelly Borgeaud (29 November 1931 – 14 July 2004) was a French film actress. She appeared in more than 40 films between 1955 and 2001. Borgeaud was born in Geneva, Switzerland, and died in Creuse, France, at age 72. Her film career spanned 50 years. In 1968, she appeared on Broadway as Elmire in Tartuffe.

== Filmography ==
| Year | Title | Role | Notes |
|---|---|---|---|
| 1955 | Black Dossier | Danièle Limousin | |
| 1955 | Hotel Adlon | Ninette | |
| 1956 | Cela s'appelle l'aurore | Angela | |
| 1956 | The Mountains Between Us | Jacqueline Escher | |
| 1960 | Vers l'extase | Odette | |
| 1963 | Codine | Zoitza Zograffi | |
| 1963 | Muriel | La femme du couple d'acheteurs | |
| 1969 | Mississippi Mermaid | Berthe | |
| 1975 | Speak to Me of Love | La belle mère | |
| 1977 | The Man Who Loved Women | Delphine Grezel | |
| 1978 | Le sucre | Hilda Courtois | |
| 1980 | Mon oncle d'Amérique | Arlette Le Gall | |
| 1980 | Une femme au bout de la nuit | L'amie de Rose | |
| 1984 | Paroles et Musique | Julie | |
| 1987 | Maladie d'amour | | (scenes deleted) |
| 1988 | Dandin | Madame de Sotenville | |
| 1989 | Comédie d'été | Louise | |
| 1990 | Tumultes | The Mother | |
| 1992 | The Accompanist | Madame Vasseur | |
| 1993 | Une nouvelle vie | Nadine | |
| 1996 | Stabat mater | La mère | |
| 1997 | Same Old Song | Doctor #3 | |
| 1998 | The Perfect Guy | La mère de Jeanne | |
| 1999 | La vie ne me fait pas peur | | |
| 2000 | Confusion of Genders | Alain's Mother | |
