= Louis Adlon =

German-born actor (1907–1947)

Louis Adlon, Jr.
- Born: October 7, 1907; Berlin, Germany
- Died: March 31, 1947 (aged 39); Los Angeles, California, US
- Other name: Duke Adlon
- Occupation: Film actor
- Years active: 1934–1945
- Spouse: Rose Davies
- Parent(s): Louis Adlon, Sr. (de) (1874–1945); Tilly (1876–?)

Louis Adlon (7 October 1907 – 31 March 1947), also known as Duke Adlon, was a German-born film actor.

== Biography ==
Adlon was the grandson of Lorenz Adlon (1849–1921), founder of the famous Adlon Hotel in Berlin, where he spent much of his childhood. Adlon was the son of Louis Adlon senior, who had five children with his first wife, Tilly. After almost 15 years of marriage, he met a hotel guest, the German-American Hedwig Leythen (1889–1967), called Hedda, at a New Year's Eve party in the Hotel Adlon, left his wife and children, and in 1922 he married her. It was one of the biggest scandals of Berlin in the 1920s. Tilly moved with her daughter, Elisabeth, then two years old, to southern Germany, while the other children, Susanne (mother of Percy Adlon), Lorenz, and the twins Carl and Louis (Jr.), were sent to boarding school and later all four emigrated to North America.

Adlon was a supporting actor and bit player in Hollywood from the late 1930s. He married Rose Douras Davies, sister of actress Marion Davies. He became a war correspondent for International News Service in May 1945, sent by his wife's sister's lover, William Randolph Hearst, to a ruined Berlin and saw the ruins of his parents' home and a burnt-out Hotel Adlon. His first article is about personal loss, the destroyed city of his youth and the death of his father. He died of a heart attack following a trip to Mexico.

In the early morning hours of August 6, 1945, Adlon was assaulted and robbed of $150 cash and $2500 in jewelry by 4 assailants on the Sunset Strip while driving home from a party.

Originally interred in the Douras Family Mausoleum at Hollywood Forever Cemetery, his remains were removed and buried in front of the mausoleum in March 1951. Although his Hollywood screen roles were minuscule at best, Adlon later gained fame as the main character of the 1997 semi-documentary In The Glamorous World of the Adlon Hotel, written and directed by his nephew, German director Percy Adlon (1935–2024).

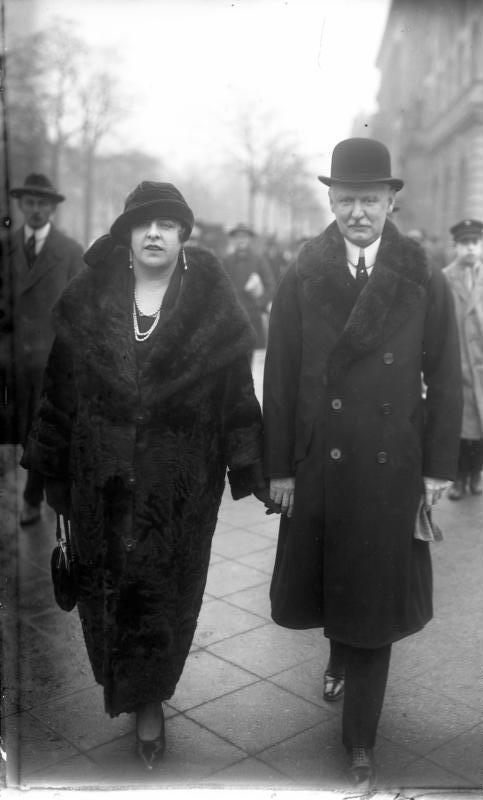
Louis Adlon, Sr. and second wife, Hedwig Leythen

== See also ==
- Pamela Adlon (born 1966), American actress, daughter-in-law of Percy
- Hotel Adlon, German film, from book by Louis's father's second wife
