= Hotel Adlon (film) =

1955 film

- Directed by: Josef von Báky
- Written by: Hedda Adlon; Emil Burri; Johannes Mario Simmel
- Produced by: Artur Brauner
- Starring: Sebastian Fischer; Nelly Borgeaud; René Deltgen
- Cinematography: Fritz Arno Wagner
- Edited by: Walter Wischniewsky
- Music by: Georg Haentzschel
- Production company: CCC Film
- Distributed by: Herzog Film
- Release date: 1 September 1955
- Running time: 96 minutes
- Country: West Germany
- Language: German

Hotel Adlon is a 1955 West German drama film filmed in German and directed by Josef von Báky, starring Sebastian Fischer, Nelly Borgeaud and René Deltgen. It was shot at the Spandau Studios in West Berlin. The film's sets were designed by the art director Rolf Zehetbauer.

== Portrayal ==
The film portrays life at the luxurious Berlin Hotel Adlon from 1907 to 1945. It was inspired by the 1955 autobiography, Hotel Adlon. Das Berliner Hotel, in dem die große Welt zu Gast war, published in English in 1960 as Hotel Adlon: The Life and Death of a Great Hotel by Hedda Adlon (1889–1967) (née Hedwig Leythen), daughter-in-law of Lorenz Adlon and Louis Adlon's father's second wife.

== Other Portrayals ==
Film director Percy Adlon, great-grandson of Lorenz Adlon, made a documentary about the hotel called The Glamorous World of the Adlon Hotel in 1996. A three-part drama mini-series set at the hotel entitled Hotel Adlon: A Family Saga was broadcast on the German television station ZDF in January 2013 and a documentary Das Adlon – Die Dokumentation (The Adlon: A Documentary) was also broadcast by ZDF in January 2013.

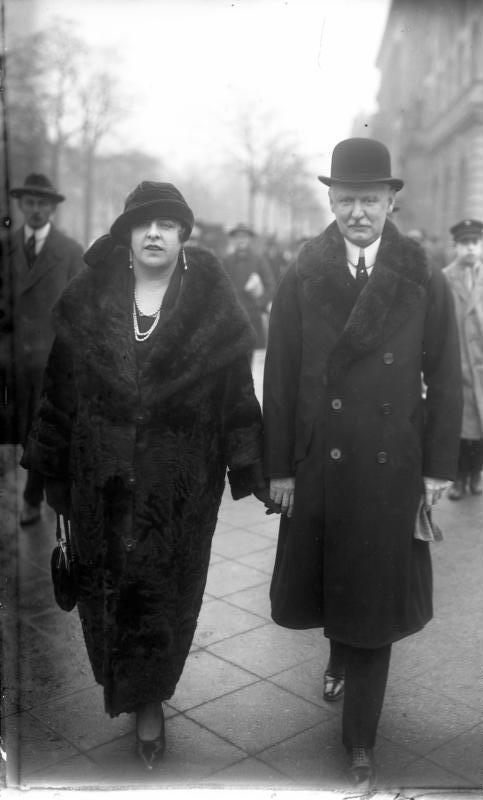
Louis Adlon, Sr. and second wife, Hedda Adlon

== Cast ==
- Sebastian Fischer as Paul Rippert
- Nelly Borgeaud as Ninette
- René Deltgen as Gravic
- Werner Hinz as Lorenz Adlon
- Nadja Tiller as Mabel
- Erich Schellow as Louis Adlon (senior)
- Karl John as Herr von Malbrand
- Peter Mosbacher as Herr Andrewski
- Lola Müthel as Nina
- Hans Caninenberg as Direktor Jansen
- Walter Bluhm as Solicitor
- Arno Paulsen as Doorman
- Kurt Buecheler
- Stanislav Ledinek
- Helmuth Lohner
- Ralph Lothar
- Werner Peters
- Ewald Wenck
- Claude Farell
- Lori Leux
- Harry Giese

== See also ==
- Lorenz Adlon (1849–1921), German hotelier
- Hotel Adlon, Berlin, Germany – built by Lorenz Adlon
- Louis Adlon junior (1907–1947), German-American film actor in Hollywood, grandson of Lorenz
- Pamela Adlon (born 1966), American actress, daughter-in-law of Percy

== Bibliography ==
- Frodon, Jean-Michel. Cinema and the Shoah. SUNY Press, 2010.
