= Gummibär discography =

- Studio albums: 14
- EPs: 8
- Soundtrack albums: 1
- Singles: 50

German character and virtual musician Gummibär has released fourteen studio albums, two soundtrack albums, one compilation album, eight extended plays (EPs), and 50 singles. The character was created by animator Peter Dodd in 2006.

In November 2006, Gummibär released its debut album, Itt Van A Gumimaci. The second Gummibär album, Funny Music, was released in France in May 2007, on the M6 Interactions label. The third album, I Am Your Gummy Bear, was released in November 2007 in the United States, and led to Gummibär's increased popularity and icon status. The fourth album, Nuki Nuki, was an English version of Dança Com O Gummy! and eventually resulted in a more complete version called La La Love To Dance.

Since then, several albums were released from 2015 to 2021, which did not find chart success. An animated series based on the character, Gummibär & Friends: The Gummy Bear Show, released a soundtrack album for two seasons. The Season One Soundtrack was released in August 2018, while the Season Two Soundtrack was released on November 13, 2024.

== Albums ==
=== Studio albums ===
List of studio albums, with details, selected chart positions, and sales
Title	Details	Peak chart positions		
Title	Details	AUT	FRA	POR
Itt Van A Gumimaci	Released: November 2, 2006; Label: CLS; Formats: CD	—	—	—
Ich Bin Dein Gummibär (single)	Released: 2006; Labels: Lautstark, Sushi Tunes, Yavido Clips; Formats: CD, digital download (iTunes), streaming, vinyl	—	—	—
Funny Music	Released: May 28, 2007 (France), June 4, 2009 (Taiwan); Label: M6 Interactions; Formats: CD, streaming	—	—	—
I Am Your Gummy Bear	Released: October 1, 2007 (Czech/Slovak release), November 13, 2007 (US); Label: Gummybear International; Formats: Digital download, streaming, CD	52	105	30
Gumidiszkó!	Released: February 19, 2008; Label: CLS; Formats: CD	—	—	—
Dança Com O Gummy!	Released: April 3, 2009; Label: Iplay Portugal; Formats: CD, streaming	—	—	—
Nuki Nuki	Released: May 18, 2009; Label: Magic Records Poland; Formats: CD, streaming	—	—	—
La La Love To Dance	Released: March 9, 2010; Label: Gummybear International; Formats: Digital download, streaming, CD	—	—	16
Καρναβάλι με τον Gummy Bear	Released: February 8, 2010; Label: Universal Music Greece; Formats: CD, streaming	—	—	—
Christmas Jollies	Released: December 7, 2010; Label: Gummybear International; Formats: Digital download, streaming, CD	—	—	—
Party Pop	Released: October 16, 2015; Label: Gummybear International; Formats: Digital download, streaming, CD	—	—	—
The Gummy Bear Album	Released: November 13, 2019; Label: Gummybear International; Formats: Digital download, streaming, CD; Has alternate release called Comics Digest.	—	—	—
Gummy Bear Album 2020	Released: November 20, 2020; Label: Gummybear International; Formats: Digital download, streaming	—	—	—
Holiday Fun Time	Released: November 12, 2021; Label: Gummybear International; Formats: Digital download, streaming	—	—	—
"—" denotes a recording that did not chart or was not released in that territory.

=== Soundtrack albums ===
List of soundtrack albums, with details
Title	Details
The Gummy Bear Show: Season One Soundtrack	Released: August 17, 2018; Label: Gummybear International; Formats: Digital download, streaming
The Gummy Bear Show: Season Two Soundtrack	Released: November 13, 2024; Label: Gummybear International; Formats: Digital download, streaming

=== Compilation albums ===
List of compilation albums, with details
Title	Details
The Gummy Bear Song Around the World	Released: November 16, 2018; Label: Gummybear International; Formats: Digital download, streaming

== Extended plays ==
List of extended plays, with details
Title	Details	Notes
The Gummy Bear Song International Club Mixes	Released: 2007; Label: Gummybear International; Formats: Digital download, streaming	
I'm a Gummy Bear	Released: 2007; Label: Gummybear International; Formats: Digital download, streaming	
I'm Your Funny Bear	Released: 2007; Label: Gummybear International; Formats: Digital download, streaming	
Cho Ka Ka O	Released: 2007; Label: Gummybear International; Formats: Digital download, streaming	
Nuki Nuki (The Nuki Song)	Released: 2009; Label: Gummybear International; Formats: Digital download, streaming	
Go for the Goal (The World Cup Song) And Καρναβάλι με τον Gummy Bear (Greek)	Released: 2010; Label: Gummybear International; Formats: Digital download, streaming	
Christmas Jollies	Released: 2010; Label: Gummybear International; Formats: Digital download, streaming, CD	
The Gummy Bear Song (Halloween Special)	Released: 2019; Label: Gummybear International; Formats: Digital download, streaming	(Note: Contains a Halloween remake of "I'm a Gummy Bear" with 3 languages.)
Remixes That Weren't Good Enough For A Mainstream Release But Only At That Time Now We're Releasing Them	Released: 2024; Label: Gummybear International; Formats: Digital download, streaming	(Note: Contains five remixes originally featured on the Gummibär USB flash drive released in 2012.)
Ich Bin Dein Gummibär (Oktoberfest Mix)	Released: 2026; Label: Gummybear International; Formats: Digital download, streaming	(Note: Also contains two formerly YouTube-exclusive tracks.)

== Singles ==
Title	Year	Peak chart positions								Album	Notes
Title	Year	AUS	CAN	FRA	GER	GRE	JAP	SWE	US D/E	Album	Notes
"I'm a Gummy Bear (The Gummy Bear Song)"	2007	12	87	8	53	1	36	11	25	I Am Your Gummy Bear	
"You Know It's Christmas"	2007	—	—	—	—	—	—	—	—	Holiday Fun Time	
"Cho Ka Ka O (Choco Choco Choco)"	2008	—	—	16	—	—	—	—	—	I Am Your Gummy Bear	(Note: "Cho Ka Ka O" was originally released in 1985 by Belgian singer Annie Cordy.)
"Itsi Bitsi Petit Bikini"	2008	—	—	30	—	—	—	—	—	I Am Your Gummy Bear	(Note: "Itsy Bitsy Teenie Weenie Yellow Polkadot Bikini" was originally released by Brian Hyland in 1960.)
"It's a Great Summer"	2009	—	—	—	—	—	—	—	—	La La Love to Dance	(Note: "It's a Great Summer" was featured on the Gummibär and Friends: The Gummy Bear Show episode, "Where's Kala (Stealthy Ninja)".)
"Nuki Nuki (The Nuki Song)"	2009	—	—	—	—	—	—	—	—	La La Love to Dance	(Note: Not be confused with "Taki Taki")
"Go For The Goal"	2010	—	—	—	—	—	—	—	—	La La Love to Dance	(Note: "Go For The Goal" was featured on the Gummibär and Friends: The Gummy Bear Show episode, "Surprise Egg")
"La La La I Love You"	2010	—	—	—	—	—	—	—	—	La La Love to Dance	
"Mr. Mister Gummibär"	2011	—	—	—	—	—	—	—	—	La La Love to Dance	
"Bubble Up"	2012	—	—	—	—	—	—	—	—	La La Love to Dance	
"Gummy Style"	2012	—	—	—	—	—	—	—	—	Party Pop	(Note: "Gummy Style" is a parody of Psy's song, "Gangnam Style")
"Gummy Twist"	2013	—	—	—	—	—	—	—	—	Party Pop	(Note: "Gummy Twist" was featured on the Gummibär and Friends: The Gummy Bear Show episode, "Saving Kronk")
"Booty Twerk"	2013	—	—	—	—	—	—	—	—	Party Pop	
"Wati Wati Wu"	2013	—	—	—	—	—	—	—	—	Party Pop	
"Monster Mash"	2013	—	—	—	—	—	—	—	—	Party Pop	(Note: "Monster Mash" was originally released by Bobby Pickett in 1962.)
"Xmas Town"	2013	—	—	—	—	—	—	—	—	Party Pop	
"Gummy Bomba"	2014	—	—	—	—	—	—	—	—	Party Pop	
"Kikiriki"	2014	—	—	—	—	—	—	—	—	Party Pop	(Note: "Kikiriki" was featured on the Gummibär and Friends: The Gummy Bear Show episode, "Funny Easter Bunny".)
"Lullaby"	2015	—	—	—	—	—	—	—	—	Party Pop	
"Woof, There It Is"	2015	—	—	—	—	—	—	—	—	Party Pop	(Note: "Woof, There It Is" is a parody of Tag Team's song, "Whoomp! (There It Is)", released in May 1993.)
"Children of The World (It's Christmas)"	2015	—	—	—	—	—	—	—	—	Holiday Fun Time	
"Wiggle Wiggle"	2015	—	—	—	—	—	—	—	—	The Gummy Bear Album	
"Ghostbusters"	2016	—	—	—	—	—	—	—	—	The Gummy Bear Album	(Note: "Ghostbusters" was originally released by Ray Parker Jr. in 1984.)
"Dame La Gomita"	2018	—	—	—	—	—	—	—	—	The Gummy Bear Album	(Note: "Dame La Gomita" is a parody of El Chombo's song, "Dame Tu Cosita", released in 2018.)
"I'm Blue (Da Ba Dee)"	2018	—	—	—	—	—	—	—	—	The Gummy Bear Album	
"I Am Bear"	2019	—	—	—	—	—	—	—	—	The Gummy Bear Album	
"Cotton Eye Joe"	2020	—	—	—	—	—	—	—	—	The Gummy Bear Album	(Note: "Cotton Eye Joe" was originally released by Rednex.)
"I'm A Scatman"	2020	—	—	—	—	—	—	—	—	I Am Your Gummy Bear	(Note: "Scatman" was originally released by Scatman John in 1994.)
"Bangaman"	2020	—	—	—	—	—	—	—	—	Gummy Bear Album 2020	
"Thanksgiving Turkey Dance"	2020	—	—	—	—	—	—	—	—	Non-album singles	
"Jingle Bells"	2020	—	—	—	—	—	—	—	—	Non-album singles	
"Rhythm Is A Dancer"	2021	—	—	—	—	—	—	—	—	Gummy Bear Album 2020	(Note: "Rhythm is a Dancer" was originally released by Snap! in 1992.)
"I Am A Wellerman (The Wellerman Song)"	2021	—	—	—	—	—	—	—	—	Non-album singles	
"Jerusalema"	2021	—	—	—	—	—	—	—	—	Non-album singles	(Note: "Jerusalema" was originally released by South African musician and DJ Master KG with vocals of Nomcebo Zikode.)
"Yippa Yappa Banga (Banga Man 2)"	2022	—	—	—	—	—	—	—	—	Non-album singles	
"Funny Song"	2022	—	—	—	—	—	—	—	—	Non-album singles	(Note: "Funny Song" was originally released by music group singer Cavendish Music.)
"All the Children"	2022	—	—	—	—	—	—	—	—	Non-album singles	
"Hands in the Air"	2023	—	—	—	—	—	—	—	—	Non-album singles	(Note: "Hands in the Air" samples an instrumental of the song "What Is Love" by Haddaway throughout the song.)
"Funny DJ"	2024	—	—	—	—	—	—	—	—	I Am Your Gummy Bear	
"Kick the Ball"	2024	—	—	—	—	—	—	—	—	Non-album singles	
"Maya Banga Hey (Banga Man 3)"	2024	—	—	—	—	—	—	—	—	Non-album singles	
"King of Sports"	2025	—	—	—	—	—	—	—	—	Non-album singles	
"U Can't Touch This"	2025	—	—	—	—	—	—	—	—	Non-album singles	(Note: "U Can't Touch This" was originally released by American rapper MC Hammer in 1990.)
"Gaga Gummy"	2025	—	—	—	—	—	—	—	—	Non-album singles	
"Cruel Summer"	2025	—	—	—	—	—	—	—	—	Non-album singles	(Note: "Cruel Summer" was originally released by American singer Taylor Swift.)
"Merry Christmas"	2025	—	—	—	—	—	—	—	—	Non-album singles	
"Mr. Mister Gummibär (Reddish Remix)"	2026	—	—	—	—	—	—	—	—	Non-album singles	
"Ich Bin Dein Bär Und Du Meine Liebe"	2026	—	—	—	—	—	—	—	—	Non-album singles	
"Nuki Nuki (Bitokami Mix)"	2026	—	—	—	—	—	—	—	—	Non-album singles	
"Azizam"	2026	—	—	—	—	—	—	—	—	Non-album singles	(Note: "Azizam" was originally released by English singer Ed Sheeran.)
"—" denotes a recording that did not chart or was not released.

== Other songs ==
Title	Year	Album	Notes
"Touch Me (Gummibär)"	2007	I Am Your Gummy Bear	(Note: "Touch Me" was originally released by American singer Fonda Rae in 1984.)
"Gummy From Bom Bom Bay"	2007	I Am Your Gummy Bear	(Note: "Gummy From Bom Bom Bay" samples the 1984 song "Aa Gaye Aa Gaye" by Indian singer Asha Bhosle.)
"Funny DJ"	2007	I Am Your Gummy Bear	(Note: "Funny DJ" was originally released by French music act Daddy DJ in 1999.)
"Jodl Jodl Dance"	2007	I Am Your Gummy Bear	
"Blue (Da Ba Dee)"	2007	I Am Your Gummy Bear	(Note: "Blue (Da Ba Dee)" was originally released by Italian group Eiffel 65 in 1998.)
"Dein Popo"	2007	I Am Your Gummy Bear	
"Don't Do That"	2007	I Am Your Gummy Bear	
"Le Mambo du Décalco"	2007	I Am Your Gummy Bear	(Note: "Le Mambo du Décalco" was originally released by French singer Richard Gotainer in 1982.)
"Buj Buj Polka"	2007	I Am Your Gummy Bear	(Note: "Buj Buj Polka" originates from the Hungarian folk song "Bújj, bújj, zöld ág".)
"Do You Think I'm Sexy?"	2007	I Am Your Gummy Bear	(Note: "Do You Think I'm Sexy?" is not the same as "Da Ya Think I'm Sexy?", which was released by British singer Rod Stewart in 1978.)
"Don't Turn Around (Gummibär's In Town)"	2010	La La Love to Dance	(Note: "Don't Turn Around (Gummibär's In Town)" is Gummibär's take on the 1981 song "Der Kommisar" by Austrian music artist Falco.)
"Celebrate"	2010	La La Love to Dance	
"Boogie Woogie Dancin' Shoes"	2010	La La Love to Dance	
"Boom Bing Bing"	2010	La La Love to Dance	
"Dancin' Dancin'"	2010	La La Love to Dance	
"Jump Jump"	2010	La La Love to Dance	
"Life Is Just a Bag of Tricks"	2010	La La Love to Dance	(Note: "Life Is Just a Bag of Tricks" was used in the episode "Unboxing The Unicorn Surprise" from Gummibär and Friends: The Gummy Bear Show.)
"Disco Macko"	2010	La La Love to Dance	
"Call Me Call You"	2010	La La Love to Dance	(Note: "Call Me Call You" samples the 1977 song "Johnny, Johnny Please Come Home" by Canadian singer Claudja Berry.)
"Aerobic"	2010	La La Love to Dance	
"I Want Candy"	2015	Party Pop	(Note: "I Want Candy" was originally released by The Strangeloves in 1965, although it takes inspiration from the British new wave band Bow Wow Wow.)
"Moves Like Jagger"	2015	Party Pop	(Note: "Moves Like Jagger" was originally released by American group Maroon 5 featuring singer Christina Aguilera in 2011.)
"The Locomotion"	2015	Party Pop	(Note: "The Loco-Motion" was originally released by American singer Little Eva.)
"Lucky Star"	2015	Party Pop	
"Spooky (Ready Or Not)"	2016	The Gummy Bear Show: Season One soundtrack	
"Achoo Gesundheit"	2016	The Gummy Bear Show: Season One soundtrack	
"Robo Gummy"	2016	The Gummy Bear Show: Season One soundtrack	
"Who Ate It?"	2016	The Gummy Bear Show: Season One soundtrack	
"I've Got The Hiccups"	2016	The Gummy Bear Show: Season One soundtrack	
"Macaroni Tree"	2016	The Gummy Bear Show: Season One soundtrack	
"Don't Ha Ha"	2016	The Gummy Bear Show: Season One soundtrack	
"Maroon Maroonba"	2016	The Gummy Bear Show: Season One soundtrack	
"Kitten Up a Tree"	2016	The Gummy Bear Show: Season One soundtrack	
"Monster on the Loose"	2016	The Gummy Bear Show: Season One soundtrack	
"Everything Is Boring"	2016	The Gummy Bear Show: Season One soundtrack	
"I Love My Puppy"	2016	The Gummy Bear Show: Season One soundtrack	
"Ice Ice Gummy"	2016	The Gummy Bear Show: Season One soundtrack	(Note: "Ice Ice Gummy" doesn't really sound like "Ice Ice Baby", released by Rapper Vanilla Ice.)
"No More, No, No, No"	2016	The Gummy Bear Show: Season One soundtrack	
"Crossing the Line"	2016	The Gummy Bear Show: Season One soundtrack	
"Ring Goes The Bell"	2016	The Gummy Bear Show: Season One soundtrack	
"Santa's Little Helpers"	2016	The Gummy Bear Show: Season One soundtrack	
"It's Good to Be a Prince"	2017	The Gummy Bear Show: Season One soundtrack	
"I'm a Super Gummy"	2017	The Gummy Bear Show: Season One soundtrack	
"Everything is Scary"	2017	The Gummy Bear Show: Season One soundtrack	
"Let's Go Camping"	2017	The Gummy Bear Show: Season One soundtrack	
"Fly Me to the Moon"	2017	The Gummy Bear Show: Season One soundtrack	
"Mini, Mini, Mini"	2017	The Gummy Bear Show: Season One soundtrack	
"Dancing on the Ceiling"	2017	The Gummy Bear Show: Season One soundtrack	(Note: "Dancing on the Ceiling" was originally released by American singer Lionel Richie in 1986.)
"Buzz Buzz Goes The Fly"	2017	The Gummy Bear Show: Season One soundtrack	
"Sleep Slepwalking"	2017	The Gummy Bear Show: Season One soundtrack	
"Snoring"	2017	The Gummy Bear Show: Season One soundtrack	
"Fiddle Diddle"	2017	The Gummy Bear Show: Season One soundtrack	
"He's My Imaginary Friend"	2017	The Gummy Bear Show: Season One soundtrack	
"Plan Gummy"	2017	The Gummy Bear Show: Season One soundtrack	
"I'm Feeling Lucky Day"	2017	The Gummy Bear Show: Season One soundtrack	
"Shazam"	2017	The Gummy Bear Show: Season One soundtrack	
"Love to Roll, Roll, Roll"	2017	The Gummy Bear Show: Season One soundtrack	
"Calling Sherlock Gummybear"	2017	The Gummy Bear Show: Season One soundtrack	
"Tiki Taki Taka"	2018	The Gummy Bear Album	
"My Piano"	2018	The Gummy Bear Album	
"Gummy Ninja Time"	2018	The Gummy Bear Album	
"Lollipop"	2018	The Gummy Bear Album	
"Happy Birthday to You"	2018	The Gummy Bear Album	(Note: "Happy Birthday to You" was originally released by Patty Hill and Mildred J. Hill.)
"Gummy Shark"	2018	The Gummy Bear Album	(Note: "Gummy Shark" is a parody of "Baby Shark".)
"I Would Like to Have a Party"	2018	The Gummy Bear Album	
"Gummy Egg"	2018	The Gummy Bear Album	
"Hey Look!"	2018	The Gummy Bear Album	
"Gummerish"	2018	Non-album singles	
"Gribbit Gribbit"	2018	Non-album singles	
"Mouse Got Your Tongue"	2019	Non-album singles	
"Pizza Pirate"	2019	Non-album singles	
"Gabba Gabba Yum Yum"	2019	Non-album singles	
"Rolling, Rolling, Rolling"	2019	Non-album singles	
"Ice Cream You Scream"	2019	Non-album singles	
"Run Run Run"	2019	Non-album singles	
"Return of the Alien"	2019	Non-album singles	(Note: "Return of the Alien" was originally titled "Alan the Alien".)
"Banzai High as a Kite"	2019	Non-album singles	
"Mirror Mirror on the Wall"	2019	Non-album singles	
"We Love Pancakes"	2019	Non-album singles	
"Gummy's Cloudy Day"	2019	Non-album singles	
"Busy Buzzing Bees"	2019	Non-album singles	
"Harry is So Hairy"	2019	Non-album singles	
"It's a Gummy Life"	2019	Non-album singles	
"Crack a Smile (My Friend)"	2019	Non-album singles	
"Dancing on The Celling"	2020	Non-album singles	
"Gummy's Jinx"	2020	Non-album singles	
"Hypno Kronk"	2020	Non-album singles	
"Riding in My Wheelchair"	2020	Non-album singles	
"We're Havin' Fun Fun Fun"	2020	Non-album singles	(Note: "We're Havin' Fun Fun Fun" was originally titled "Pool Party".)
"Gimmie Dat Thing"	2020	Non-album singles	(Note: "Gimmie Dat Thing" was originally titled "Remote Gumtrol".)
"Ride 'em Cowboy"	2020	Non-album singles	(Note: "Ride 'em Cowboy" was originally titled "Ride 'em Gumboy".)
"Be Your Friend"	2020	Gummy Bear Album 2020	
"Pump Up The Jam"	2020	Gummy Bear Album 2020	(Note: "Pump Up The Jam" was originally released by Belgian music act Technotronic.)
"Gummy Americano"	2020	Gummy Bear Album 2020	(Note: Not to be confused with "We No Speak Americano".)
"Mister Babelina"	2020	Gummy Bear Album 2020	
"My Melodieeee"	2020	Gummy Bear Album 2020	
"Kuschelbär"	2020	Gummy Bear Album 2020	(Note: "Kuschelbär" has a similar melody to "I'm a Gummy Bear".)
"I Like to Move It"	2020	Gummy Bear Album 2020	(Note: "I Like to Move It" was originally released by American music project Reel 2 Real.)
"No Limit"	2020	Gummy Bear Album 2020	(Note: "No Limit" was originally released by Belgian-Dutch Eurodance group 2 Unlimited.)
"The Happy Wanderer"	2020	Gummy Bear Album 2020	(Note: "The Happy Wanderer" is a cover of the popular song of the same name.)
"Balla"	2020	Gummy Bear Album 2020	
"Peek-a-Boo"	2021	Non-album singles	
"Harry Monster"	2021	Non-album singles	
"My Puppy"	2021	Non-album singles	
"Gummy The Ghost Hunter"	2021	Non-album singles	
"Stuck With You"	2021	Non-album singles	
"Pied Gummy"	2021	Non-album singles	
"Funny DJ (RƎMIX)"	2021	Non-album singles	(Note: "Funny DJ (RƎMIX)" is a remix of Funny DJ.)
