= Gummy Bear (disambiguation) =

Gummy bear is a fruit gum candy.

Gummy Bear may also refer to:

- Gummibär, a viral character band from Germany.
- "I'm a Gummy Bear (The Gummy Bear Song)", a song by Gummibär.
- "GummyBear", a song by Mini Mansions from their 2019 album Guy Walks Into a Bar...

== See also ==
- Gummi Bears (disambiguation)
