= Everybody Dance Now (album) =

Studio album by Crazy Frog
- Released: 25 August 2009
- Recorded: 2009
- Genre: Dance
- Length: 53:47
- Labels: Ministry of Sound, Mach 1 GmbH, Universal Music Group

Crazy Frog chronology
Crazy Frog Presents More Crazy Hits (2006)	Everybody Dance Now (2009)	Untitled Crazy Frog album (TBA)

Singles from Everybody Dance Now
- 1. "Daddy DJ" Released: August 2009; 2. "Cha Cha Slide" Released: October 2009; 3. "Safety Dance" Released: November 2009

Everybody Dance Now is the third album from Crazy Frog, released on 25 August 2009. "Daddy DJ", "Cha Cha Slide", and "Safety Dance" were the three singles released from the album. In France, they respectively peaked at #4 and #18 on the SNEP chart, and the album reached #23.

== Track listing ==
Based on Discogs:

No.	Title	Writer(s)	Original artist	Length
1.	"Join The Frog"		Original song	0:58
2.	"Cha Cha Slide"	Willie Perry Jr.	DJ Casper	3:04
3.	"Everyone"		Basshunter	3:15
4.	"Daddy DJ" (Crazy Frog Video Mix)	David Le Roy; Jean-Christophe Belval	Daddy DJ	2:54
5.	"Friends" (Ween Meets The Crazy Frog Remix)	Gene Ween; Dean Ween	Ween	4:09
6.	"Maya Hi, Maya Hu"	Dan Bălan; Manör Sevan	O-Zone	2:58
7.	"Just Can't Get Enough"	Vince Clarke	Depeche Mode	3:00
8.	"Jump"	Eddie Van Halen; Alex Van Halen; David Lee Roth; Michael Anthony	Van Halen	2:57
9.	"Solo Frog"		Original song	2:11
10.	"No Limit"	Phil Wilde; Jean-Paul De Coster; Ray Slijngaard; Anita Dels	2 Unlimited	3:44
11.	"Play The Game"	Unknown	Traditional	2:54
12.	"Push It"	Hurby Azor; Ray Davies	Salt-N-Pepa	3:06
13.	"Gonna Make You Sweat (Everybody Dance Now)"	Robert Clivillés; Fredrick B. Williams	C+C Music Factory	3:11
14.	"Safety Dance"	Ivan Doroschuk	Men Without Hats	2:56
15.	"Come On"		Original song	2:50
16.	"Let's Go Crazy"		Original song	3:29
17.	"Bump The Beat"		Original song	2:57
18.	"I Wanna Rock the Place"		Original song	3:15
19.	"Last Christmas"	George Michael	Wham!	3:11
Total length:				53:47

== Charts ==
Chart performance
Chart (2009)	Peak position
Canadian Albums (Nielsen SoundScan)	35
French Albums (SNEP)	23
US Top Dance Albums (Billboard)	9
