= Hentai (disambiguation) =

Hentai is anime and manga pornography.

Hentai may also refer to:

== Songs ==
- "Hentai" (song), a song by Rosalía
- "Hentai", a song by Cigarettes After Sex from Cry
- "Hentai", a song by Pink Guy from Pink Season
- "Hentai", a song by S3RL
