= Less than 3 =

Less than 3 may refer to:

- <3, an emoticon meaning love or heart, see List of emoticons
- Less Than Three, a single and a song by the band We Are the Physics
- Less than 3, an album by the band Mindless Self Indulgence
- Less Than Three, a song by German music producer TheFatRat
- Less Than Three, a song made by Australian DJ S3RL
- Less Than Three, a song made by Disko Warp and Becky
