= Maddix (DJ) =

Dutch DJ, producer and remixer (born 1990)

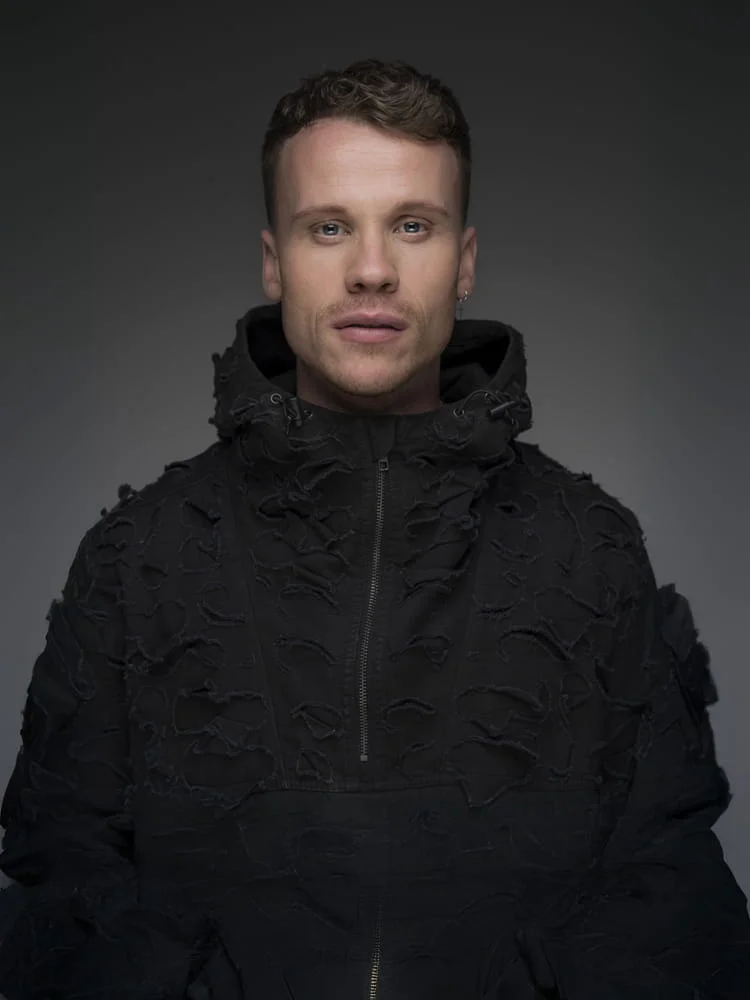
- Maddix in 2025

Background information
- Born: Pablo Rindt; 3 December 1990 (age 35); Eindhoven, North Brabant, Netherlands
- Genres: Big room house; trance; techno
- Occupations: DJ; record producer; remixer
- Instruments: FL Studio; piano; mixer; synthesizer; drums; djembe
- Years active: 2002–present
- Labels: Revealed Recordings; Extatic; Spinnin'; Armada Music; Wall Recordings
- Website: maddixmusic.com

Pablo Rindt (born 3 December 1990), professionally known as Maddix, is a Dutch electronic dance music producer and DJ.

== Background ==
Growing up, Maddix played instruments such as the djembe, piano and drums. In high school he got into electronic dance music and the digital audio workstation FL Studio.

Maddix's accomplishments in 2023 include rankings in various lists, such as being ranked #95 on DJ Mag's Top 100 DJs list. Additionally, he was recognized as the #11 Most Played Producer by 1001 Tracklists and ranked #7 as the Best Selling Techno Artist on Beatport.

Known for his distinctive blend of techno, trance, and big room house elements, Maddix's music resonates with audiences on a global scale. His releases on labels like Spinnin', Armada, Rave Culture, and Hardwell's Revealed Recordings have garnered widespread attention and acclaim.

Notably, Maddix has received support from a diverse range of artists, drawing support from different sub-genres of electronic music. From notable techno musicians like Amelie Lens and DJ Umek to EDM and trance leading musicians such as Hardwell, Dimitri Vegas & Like Mike, Tiesto, and Armin van Buuren, Maddix's music appeals across subgenres and attracts listeners from both underground and mainstream music communities.

== Discography ==
=== Singles ===
Title	Year	Record label	Additional information
"Touching the Sky"	2013	Armada Music	
"Splash"	2013	Free Download	
"Rampant"	2014	Oxygen Records (Spinnin')	
"Send Us Some Bottles"	2014	Free Download	
"Anthems"	2014	Cyron Recordings	with New Knife Gang
"Solar Flare"	2014	Free Download	
"Gravity"	2014	Free Download	
"Get Busy"	2014	F! Recordings	with Dirty Herz
"Raise Em Up"	2015	Armada Trice	
"True Blood"	2015	Free Download	
"Riptide"	2015	Revealed Recordings	
"Vortex"	2015	Free Download	
"Ghosts"	2015	Revealed Recordings	
"Pulsar"	2016	Armada Trice	
"Lynx"	2016	Revealed Recordings	with Futuristic Polar Bears
"Tumalon"	2016	Wall Recordings	
"Jackal"	2016	Free Download	
"Voltage"	2016	Revealed Recordings	with Jayden Jaxx
"Dirty Bassline"	2016	Revealed Recordings	
"Zodiac"	2016	Free Download	
"Invictus"	2016	Revealed Recordings	with Olly James
"Unstoppable"	2016	Spinnin' Premium (Spinnin')	with Tony Junior
"Game On"	2016	Revealed Recordings	
"Shake It"	2016	Revealed Recordings	with Joey Dale
"Trippin"	2017	Wall Recordings	
"Bang"	2017	Revealed Recordings	with Kevu
"Fauda"	2017	Metanoia Music	with Rivero
"B.A.S.E"	2017	Revealed Recordings	with Kill The Buzz
"Smash This Beat"	2017	Revealed Recordings	with Hardwell
"Showdown"	2017	Revealed Recordings	with LoaX
"Badman"	2017	Pressplay Recordings	with Futuristic Polar Bears
"The Underground"	2017	Revealed Recordings	
"Trabanca"	2017	Revealed Recordings	with Junior
"Mantra"	2017	Revealed Recordings	
"Lose Control"	2018	Revealed Recordings	
"Soldier"	2018	Revealed Recordings	with Kevu featuring LePrince
"Keep It Jackin"	2018	Revealed Recordings	
"Bella Ciao"	2018	Revealed Recordings	cover of Bella Ciao, with Hardwell
"The Prophecy"	2018	Revealed Recordings	with Timmy Trumpet
"Shuttin It Down"	2018	Revealed Recordings	featuring Kris Kiss
"Mangalam"	2018	Heavyweight Records	with Will Sparks
"Zero"	2019	Revealed Recordings	
"The Omen"	2019	Revealed Recordings	
"Invincible (Till The Day We Die)"	2019	Revealed Recordings	featuring Michael Jo
"With Or Without You"	2019	Revealed Recordings	
"People Are Strange"	2019	Revealed Recordings	with Kaaze featuring Nino Lucarelli
"Future Noise"	2019	Revealed Recordings	with Kaaze
"Follow Me"	2020	Revealed Recordings	with SaberZ
"Bad Meets Evil"	2020	Revealed Recordings	featuring Anvy
"Ecstasy"	2020	Revealed Recordings	
"Technology"	2020	Revealed Recordings	
"Existence"	2020	Revealed Recordings	
"Electric"	2020	Revealed Recordings	
"Tekno"	2020	Revealed Recordings	
"Your Mind"	2020	Revealed Recordings	Tribe EP Vol.1
"The Rave"	2020	Revealed Recordings	Tribe EP Vol.1
"Reality"	2020	Revealed Recordings	
"Activating"	2021	Rave Culture	
"Superheroes"	2021	Revealed Recordings	interpolation of Daddy DJ by Daddy DJ
"In My Body"	2021	Revealed Recordings	
"Home"	2021	Revealed Recordings	
"Receive Life"	2021	Revealed Recordings	
"Acid Soul"	2021	Revealed Recordings	
"Space In Your Mind"	2021	3rd Dale Universe	with The Rocketman
"Pydna"	2021	Revealed Recordings	
"Different State"	2021	Revealed Recordings	
"State Of Mind"	2021	Revealed Recordings	
"The Formula"	2022	Revealed Recordings	
"Culture"	2022	Revealed Recordings	
"Purpose"	2022	Maxximize Records (Spinnin')	with Blasterjaxx
"Ce Soir (Voulez-Vous)"	2022	Revealed Recordings	
"No Escape"	2022	Revealed Recordings	
"Heute Nacht"	2022	Revealed Recordings	
"Thrill"	2022	Revealed Recordings	with Linka & Gregor Potter
"Take Me Away Again"	2023	Spinnin' Records	cover of "Take Me Away" by 4 Strings, with Hardwell & 4 Strings
"Raw Diamonds"	2023	Revealed Recordings	featuring Penelope
"Revolution"	2023	Revealed Recordings	with Hardwell & Timmy Trumpet
"Acid"	2023	Revealed Recordings	with Hardwell featuring Luciana
"Close To You"	2023	Dharma Worldwide (Spinnin') / Extatic Records (Revealed)	with Kshmr
"My Gasoline"	2023	Extatic Records (Revealed)	featuring Fēlēs
"Hypnotizing"	2023	1605	with DJ Umek
"90s Bitch"	2023	Extatic Records (Revealed)	with The Rocketman
"Spiritum"	2024	We Next (Sony Music)	with Vini Vici & Shibui
"Open Sesame (Abracadabra)"	2024	Revealed Recordings	rework of Open Sesame by Leila K, featuring Leila K
"16"	2024	Revealed Recordings	cover of "16" by Ard Und Jorn, with Hardwell and Blasterjaxx
"Adrenalina (Minha Gasolina)"	2024	Extatic Records (Revealed)	with Ceres
"Meet Her At The Love Parade"	2024	Smash The House	rework of "Meet Her at the Love Parade" by Da Hool, with Dimitri Vegas & Like Mike & Da Hool featuring Kiki Solvej
"Love Takes Over"	2024	Extatic Records (Revealed)	featuring Sarah de Warren
"Late At Night"	2025	Armada Music / Kontor Records / Spannung Records	remix of "We Don't Care" by Audio Bullys, with Lilly Palmer
"The Ultimate Seduction"	2025	Extatic Records (Revealed)	rework of "The Ultimate Seduction" by The Ultimate Seduction, with TMPL
"Transmission"	2026	Extatic Records (Revealed)	with Olly James and Hannah Laing
"No Bad Parts"	2026	Killed It!	with Barely Alive and Tynan

=== Remixes ===
Artist	Remix	Label	Year
Ana Criado & Beatservice	Whispers (Maddix Remix)*	Free Download	2013
Pestroy	Pay For Your Saviour (Maddix Remix)		2013
Calvin Harris ft. Ellie Goulding	Outside (Maddix Remix)*	Free Download	2014
Dannic ft. Bright Lights	Dear Life (Maddix Remix)*	Free Download	2014
Sick Individuals	Lost & Found (Maddix Remix)*	Free Download	2015
Shane 54 ft. Jenny Jordan	Paradise (Maddix Remix)	Nettwerk	2016
Sick Individuals	Alive (Maddix Remix)	Revealed Recordings	2017
Maddix ft. Michael Jo	Invincible (Till The Day We Die) (Festival Mix)	Revealed Recordings	2019
Kaaze & Maddix ft. Nino Lucarelli	People Are Strange (Festival Mix)	Revealed Recordings	2019
Armin van Buuren ft. Trevor Guthrie	This Is What It Feels Like (Maddix Remix)	Armada Music	2020
Maddix	Superheroes (Tribe Edit)	Revealed Recordings	2021
Hardwell ft. Amba Shepherd	Apollo (Maddix Remix)	Revealed Recordings	2021
Pink Soldiers	Squid Game (Maddix Remix)*	Free Download	2021
Marcel Woods	Advanced (Maddix Remix)	Be Yourself Music	2022
Mau P	Drugs From Amsterdam (Maddix Remix)*	Free Download	2022
Tiësto	Lethal Industry (Maddix Remix)	Magik Muzik	2022
Fred again.. & Swedish House Mafia ft. Future	Turn On The Lights again.. (Maddix Techno Remix)*	Free Download	2022
Will Atkinson	Telescope (Maddix Remix)	Black Hole Recordings	2022
David Guetta vs. Benny Benassi	Satisfaction (Hardwell & Maddix Remix)	Spinnin' Records	2023
Tiësto	Lay Low (Maddix Remix)	Musical Freedom	2023
Supermode	Tell Me Why (Maddix Remix)	Axtone Records	2023
Tiësto	Traffic (Maddix Remix)	Magik Muzik	2023
Armin van Buuren	Computers Take Over The World (Maddix Remix)	Armada Music	2023
Armin van Buuren	Lose This Feeling (Maddix Remix)	Armada Music	2023
Maddix & Basswell ft. Fēlēs	My Gasoline (Hard Edit)	Extatic Records (Revealed)	2024

* Not an official remix.

== Awards and nominations ==
=== DJ Magazine top 100 DJs ===
Year	Position	Notes	Ref.
2023	95	New Entry	
2024	69	Up 26	
2025	53	Up 16	

=== 1001Tracklists Top 101 Producers ===
Year	Position	Notes	Ref.
2022	63	New Entry	
2023	11	Up 52	
2024	15	Down 4	
2025	68	Down 53	
