= Cha Cha Slide =

2000 single by DJ Casper

"Cha-Cha Slide"

Single by DJ Casper
- Released: August 2, 2000
- Recorded: 1998
- Length: 6:26 (original version); 3:46 (original radio edit); 3:41 (Hardino version)
- Label: Universal
- Songwriter: Willie Perry Jr.
- Producers: Willie Perry & the Platinum Band; Frederick Johnson

Music video
- "Cha-Cha Slide" on YouTube

"Cha-Cha Slide" (or "Casper Slide Part 2") is a line dance song by American musician DJ Casper, released under the alias Mr. C the Slide Man. The song was released as a single in August 2000 and spent five weeks on the Billboard Hot 100 chart, peaking at number 83. Four years later, "Cha-Cha Slide" became a hit in Europe and Australia, especially in the United Kingdom, where it topped the UK Singles Chart in March 2004.

== History ==
=== "Casper Slide" Parts 1 & 2 ===
DJ Casper (Willie Perry Jr.) originally wrote "The Cha-Cha Slide" as a step aerobics routine for his nephew, David Wilson, who was working at the time as a fitness trainer at Bally Total Fitness Health Club in Chicago's Hyde Park neighborhood. In its original form, the song was just a set of instructions of the original version of the song, titled "Casper Slide Part 1" in January 1998 using "Plastic Dreams" by Jaydee as the musical track.

The song was inspired by the Chicago stepping movement, where DJ Casper cut a notable figure in the clubs. Wilson went so far as to compare his uncle's dancing prowess to MC Hammer. Because Casper did not own "Plastic Dreams", he hired a band to record an instrumental track at the home studio of Fred Johnson with the help of Hollywood Scott, band leader for the Platinum Band. He called this version of the song "Casper Slide Part 2."

Musically, the song utilizes a four-on-the-floor house rhythm.

Perry recorded and released the song at his own expense. He manufactured copies and distributed them with the help of Gardner Douglas ("Cisco"), owner of the Cisco's Music World record stores in Chicago, Illinois. It was publicly released on August 2, 2000.

=== "Cha-Cha Slide" ===
DJ Casper enlisted the help of M.O.B. Music Publishing to produce, edit, and engineer the new version of the song "Cha-Cha Slide". M.O.B., or Men On Business, also produced several other accompanying songs to produce the entire Slide Album. DJ Casper and Men On Business licensed the Slide Album to Universal Records, and it was released on September 19, 2000.

Universal's Senior Vice President of Urban Promotion Michael Horton recalled, "We made some instructional 'Cha-Cha Slide' dance videos and distributed them to clubs...We also promoted the song at various black functions, such as homecoming events at black colleges." Horton claimed many radio stations' initial response to the song was, "There's no way we're playing it," but Universal's promotion department was persistent and finally got it on the air. The song then made its way to R&B/hip hop station WGCI-FM in DJ Casper's hometown of Chicago, the first radio station to play the song. Horton accurately predicted the future of the song: "It's like a novelty that will eventually die down, but it will never go away completely—just like the electric slide and the bus stop are still around."

In 2001, the following year, the dance caught on around Canada and the United States, where urban contemporary radio stations (and later mobile DJs) played the song continuously. In March 2004, the Hardino mix of "Cha Cha Slide" was released in the United Kingdom and went on to top the UK Singles Chart. Its success in the United Kingdom was helped by Scott Mills of BBC Radio 1, who promoted the song on his weekday afternoon radio show.

== Legacy ==
In August 2020 in honor of the 20th anniversary, Google added an Easter egg where when "Cha Cha Slide" is searched for, a microphone appears next to the music video. Some lyrics from the song are played when the button is clicked.

"Cha Cha Slide" is also played during the eighth inning of San Francisco Giants home games at Oracle Park to ward off seagulls.

== Music video ==
The music video was shot in downtown Chicago. At the beginning of the video, a news van arrives in front of a crowd of people doing the dance on a sidewalk. After that, the reporter reports on the dance. Then, the video transitions to several scenes, including DJ Casper dancing with a group of people on a white background and different people in various locations doing said dance. Near the end of the video, the news camera crew begins dancing a bit. In the last scene, the reporter dances with them.

== Controversy ==
In 2011, Willie Perry Jr. and Jerome Haywood filed a lawsuit against M.O.B. Productions. The suit alleged that M.O.B. obtained a false copyright registration under the title "Casper Cha-Cha Slide (Live Platinum Band)".

== Album ==
The song was also part of an 11-track various artists album, Cha-Cha Slide: The Original Slide Album, released in September 2000.

No.	Title	Writer(s)	Length
1.	"Cha-Cha Slide" (radio edit)		3:46
2.	"Cha-Cha Slide" (club edit)		7:44
3.	"Bus Stop/Electric Slide" (radio)	Charles Green Hudson Beaudy	4:45
4.	"Casper Slide Part 2"	With Live Platinum Band	6:27
5.	"Step to This" (vocal)	Colta / Ken Uchida	5:29
6.	"Unworthy" (house vocal)	Colta	4:47
7.	"Unworthy" (instrumental)	Colta	4:25
8.	"Bus Stop/Electric Slide" (original)	Charles Green Hudson Beaudy	7:55
9.	"DJ Eric-B Slide"	DJ Eric-B	9:45
10.	"Step to This" (instrumental)	Colta / Ken Uchida	5:29
11.	"R-U-Here"	Colta

== Charts ==
=== Weekly charts ===
Chart (2000–2004)	Peak position
Australia (ARIA)	64
Belgium (Ultratop 50 Flanders)	2
Belgium (Ultratop 50 Wallonia)	20
Europe (Eurochart Hot 100)	6
France (SNEP)	14
Germany (GfK)	83
Ireland (IRMA)	3
Ireland Dance (IRMA)	1
Italy (FIMI)	17
Netherlands (Dutch Top 40)	14
Netherlands (Single Top 100)	12
Romania (Romanian Top 100)	36
Scottish Singles Sales (Official Charts)	1
Switzerland (Schweizer Hitparade)	86
UK Singles (Official Charts)	1
US Billboard Hot 100	83
US Hot R&B/Hip-Hop Singles & Tracks (Billboard)	24
US Maxi-Singles Sales (Billboard)	24

=== Year-end charts ===
Chart (2004)	Position
Belgium (Ultratop 50 Flanders)	6
Belgium (Ultratop 50 Wallonia)	75
France (SNEP)	82
Netherlands (Single Top 100)	80
UK Singles (OCC)	3

== Certifications ==
Region	Certification	Certified units/sales
United Kingdom (BPI)	Platinum	760,000

== Release history ==
Region	Date	Format(s)	Label(s)	Ref(s).
United States	August 2, 2000	7-inch vinyl; 12-inch vinyl	Universal	
United States	September 19, 2000	Rhythmic contemporary; urban radio	Universal	
United Kingdom	March 1, 2004	12-inch vinyl; CD	All Around the World	
United States	April 26, 2004	Contemporary hit radio	Universal	
Australia	May 17, 2004	CD	Universal	

== Crazy Frog version ==
"Cha Cha Slide"

Single by Crazy Frog

from the album Everybody Dance Now
- Released: August 25, 2009
- Genre: Dance
- Length: 3:03
- Label: MOB Music Publishing
- Songwriter: William Perry Jr.
- Producer: M. Thompson

Crazy Frog singles chronology
"Daddy DJ" (2009)	"Cha Cha Slide" (2009)	"Tricky" (2021)

Music video
- "Cha Cha Slide" on YouTube

On August 25, 2009, Crazy Frog released "Cha Cha Slide" for the album Everybody Dance Now.

=== Charts ===
Chart (2009)	Peak position
France (SNEP)	18
