= Panda and Gummy Bear =

Chinese animated TV series

- Official poster featuring the characters Hehe the Panda and Gummibär.
- Based on: Gummibär by Christian P. Schneider Panda+ by CCTV Animation Group
- Directed by: Kang Xiaolin and Liu Yanyan
- Countries of origin: China; Germany
- No. of seasons: 4
- No. of episodes: 52

Production
- Production companies: Gummybear International; CCTV Animation Group Co., Ltd

Original release
- Network: CCTV-14; YouTube
- Release: April 5, 2025 – present

Related
- Gummibär & Friends: The Gummy Bear Show

Panda and Gummy Bear (Chinese: 熊猫与甘米熊) is a China-Germany co-produced animated series produced by CCTV Animation Group Co., Ltd as a collaboration between the Gummibär character series and CCTV Animation Group's Panda+ series as part of the celebration of the 50th anniversary of the establishment of diplomatic relations between China and Germany, where both characters originate from. It is part of the "Panda+" animated product series and a tribute work for the 54th anniversary of the establishment of Diplomatic Relations between China and Germany. The first season premiered on CCTV-14 Children's Channel on April 5, 2025 with 13 episodes. The 2nd, 3rd and 4th seasons later premiered in 2026. The series also later globally premiered on the official Gummibär YouTube channel on November 14, 2026.

The series features China's panda "Hehe" and Germany's "Gummy Bear" as protagonists. It tells the musical adventure story of Panda Hehe, who comes to the magical Five-Tone Island to unravel the musical mystery left by his grandfather, becomes good friends with Gummy Bear, and works with him to resolve the Discord Storm crisis. The entire series consists of 13 episodes; it connects the plot through musical themes, integrates musical instrument elements from both China and Germany, and showcases the cultural characteristics and origins of exchanges between the two countries. On December 24, 2025, the series was included in the 2026 Premium Program List of CCTV-14 Children's Channel.

== Premise ==
In order to solve the music mystery left by his grandfather, Panda Hehe unintentionally arrives at the magical Five-Tone Island, becomes good friends with Gummy Bear, and thus begins a musical adventure.

The first season consists of 13 episodes, each 12 minutes long. In Episode 1, "Music Paradise", Hehe scores the highest in a music competition, only to discover that it was a dream; in Episode 2, "The Magical Stone", a dairy cow comes to deliver milk and wakes Hehe and the others, and according to legend, Hehe is regarded as a hero.

== Characters ==
Panda Hehe is China's national treasure panda and an animated character representing Chinese culture. His animated image presents the characteristics of benevolence, generosity, and humility. In the animation, Panda Hehe comes to Five-Tone Island to solve the music mystery left by his grandfather, becomes friends with Gummy Bear, and together they embark on a musical adventure.

Gummy Bear is an animated character from Germany known as Electronic Music Star. In the animation, Gummy Bear introduces the history of the two countries to everyone and, together with Panda Hehe, uses Chinese musical instruments to help complete electronic music works, showcasing China-Germany cultural fusion.

== Cast and crew ==
The directors are Kang Xiaolin and Liu Yanyan, and the screenwriters include Zhang Yixiang, Liu Yanyan, and Christian Schneider (Germany).

== Original soundtrack ==
The opening theme song "Panda and Gummy Bear" completed copyright registration on June 9, 2025 (Registration No.: National Copyright Registration No. 2025-B-00177586). The copyright owner is CCTV Animation Group Co., Ltd., and its creation was completed on May 30, 2024.

== Behind the scenes ==
The series is an animated work presented in celebration of the 50th Anniversary of the Establishment of Diplomatic Relations between China and Germany, and it adopts a China-Germany co-production and joint creation model. Its creative inspiration comes from the history of China-Germany musical and cultural exchange, especially the influence of the sound-production principle of the traditional Chinese instrument Sheng on European instruments such as the Accordion and organ in the 18th century. Through the story of the panda and Gummy Bear working together to solve musical challenges, the animation presents the historical origins of musical exchange between the two countries. Preparation for the project began in November 2021, and the film was first disclosed at the Original Premium Animation Release Conference in June 2021. On January 14, 2022, among the 2022 Key Projects and New Titles released by China Media Group CCTV Animation Group, the series made its first public appearance as a key recommended work in the "Shared Beauty and Harmony, Coexistence and Symbiosis" section. The series is jointly produced by Yangshi Animation Co., Ltd. and the German animation company GBI, and its production team includes directors and screenwriters from both China and Germany, such as directors Kang Xiaolin and Liu Yanyan, screenwriters Zhang Yixiang and Liu Yanyan, and German screenwriter Christian Schneider. In September 2024, it received project approval support from the National Radio and Television Administration and became a National Key Animation Project. In addition, some art assets (such as the prop Grandpa's Spaceship, the town square scene, and the opening title text) were completed and had their copyright registered between July and September 2024.

== Series features ==
The series uses music as its main thread, cleverly integrating musical instrument elements from both China and Germany, such as the combination of traditional Chinese instruments with German electronic music; through the story of "Grandpa Gummy Bear learning music from Grandpa Panda, to the new generation solving musical challenges together," it showcases the origins of China-Germany musical exchange; and embodies the cultural integration concept of "Shared Beauty and Harmony, Coexistence and Symbiosis," promoting China-Germany artistic dialogue.

== Promotion and Distribution ==
On January 14, 2022, China Media Group CCTV Animation Group released its 2022 Key Projects and New Titles, introducing the China-Germany co-produced animated series Panda and Gummy Bear in the "Shared Beauty and Harmony, Coexistence and Symbiosis" section.

On April 2, 2025, Yangshipin, Weibo, and other platforms announced that the series would premiere on CCTV Children's Channel on April 5, 2025.

The animated series premiered on CCTV-14 Children's Channel on April 5, 2025.

On November 13, 2026, local time, the International Cooperation Launch Ceremony for the Sino-German Co-produced Animated Series Panda and Gummy Bear was held in Berlin, Germany. The event was hosted by China International Television Corporation and Gummy Bear International GmbH. During the event, the relevant partners exchanged tokens of cooperation.

On November 14, 2026, the series started releasing globally on the official Gummibär YouTube channel with English subtitles, with episode 1, "Music Paradise".

== Impact of the work ==
The animation integrates musical instruments from various regions across China with German musical elements, giving audiences an in-depth understanding of the musical cultures of China and Germany.

As part of the "Panda Hehe" animation product series and China Media Group's "Shared Beauty and Harmony, Coexistence and Symbiosis" cultural communication strategy, the production further showcases China-Germany cultural integration through its music theme.

On September 24, 2024, the animation was included by the National Radio and Television Administration in the 2024 First Batch of Key Animation Projects List; in September 2024, it received support for project initiation.

== Awards and honors ==
In September 2024, the work was included by the National Radio and Television Administration in the list of the first batch of key animation projects of that year and received project initiation support, becoming a National Key Animation Project.

In November 2026, it was selected for the 2025 National Outstanding Animated Series.

== International co-production ==
Production model: A joint creation model is adopted, with the Chinese side responsible for building the cultural core and the German side participating in production Follow-up planning: As a component of the "Panda Hehe" series international co-production plan, it forms a brand matrix with China-Germany co-production projects.
