= Gummi Bears =

Gummi Bears may refer to:

- Gummy bear, a soft, chewy candy
- Adventures of the Gummi Bears, a Disney animated TV series
- Gummibär, a viral character band

== See also ==
- Gummy Bear (disambiguation)
