= I Am Your Gummy Bear =

Studio album by Gummibär
- Released: 13 November 2007
- Recorded: 2006–2007
- Genres: Bubblegum; dance-pop; novelty
- Length: 54:17
- Label: Gummybear International

Gummibär chronology
Funny Music (2007)	I Am Your Gummy Bear (2007)	La La Love to Dance (2010)

Singles from I Am Your Gummy Bear
- 1. "Cho Ka Ka O" Released: September 2007; 2. "I Am a Gummy Bear (The Gummy Bear Song)" Released: November 6, 2007; 3. "Itsi Bitsi Bikini" Released: March 17, 2008; 4. "I'm A Scatman" Released: July 3, 2020; 5. "Funny DJ" Released: April 26, 2024

I Am Your Gummy Bear is the debut international studio album by German virtual band Gummibär. It was released on October 12, 2007, in Poland, and November 13, 2007, via Gummybear International. It contains 17 songs interpreted by Gummibär, including "I Am a Gummy Bear", by far the group's most well known song.

== Background ==
The character of Gummibär released their first album Itt Van A Gumimaci in 2006. The album had seven songs along with two remixes and two karaoke versions. Next year, an album titled Funny Music was released, including the previous seven songs alongside new ones. All songs from both albums will later appear on this album, with the exception of the tracks "L'école est finie" and "Holiday". The song "I'm a Scatman", got reworked for Funny Music and is the version that appears in I Am Your Gummy Bear.

== Singles ==
Five singles were released for the album. The lead single "I Am a Gummy Bear (The Gummy Bear Song)" was released on August 28, 2006, in Germany, later in America on November 6, 2007. In Hungary, it spent eight months as number one atop the ringtones chart. The second single "Cho Ka Ka O" was released in September 2007, while the third single "Itsi Bitsi Petit Bikini" was released on March 17, 2008. The fourth single "I'm A Scatman" was released on July 3, 2020 while the fifth single "Funny DJ" was released on April 26, 2024.

== Track listing ==
All songs produced by tonekind and Papa Bär, except when noted.

I Am Your Gummy Bear – Standard version
No.	Title	Writer(s)	Producer(s)	Length
1.	"I Am A Gummy Bear (The Gummy Bear Song)"	Christian André Schneider; Christian Philipp Schneider	tonekind; René Rennefeld	3:12
2.	"Funny DJ"	David Le Roy; Jean Christophe Belval	tonekind; Rennefeld; Papa Bär	3:51
3.	"I'm A Scatman"	Antonio Catania; John Larkin	tonekind; Papa Bär; Aron Blankenburg	3:17
4.	"Cho Ka Ka O"	Andre Tabutin; Patrick Bousquet; Pierre Carrel	tonekind; Papa Bär; Blankenburg	3:10
5.	"Touch Me (Gummibär)"	André; Philipp; Patrick Adams		3:19
6.	"Gummy From Bom Bom Bay"	André; Philipp; Krech; Niessen		3:23
7.	"Itsi Bitsi Bikini"	Lee Pockriss; Paul Vance	tonekind; Rennefeld	2:36
8.	"Jodl Jodl Dance"	André; Philipp	tonekind; Rennefeld; Blankenburg	3:04
9.	"Blue (Da Ba Dee)"	Gianfranco Randone; Massimo Gabutti; Maurizio Lobina		4:02
10.	"Dein Popo"	André; Philipp; Rennefeld		3:12
11.	"Don't Do That"	André; Philipp; Don Oriolo		3:04
12.	"Le Mambo Du Decalco"	Claude Engel; Richard Gotainer		3:27
13.	"Buj Buj Polka"	André; Philipp; Blankenburg	tonekind; Blankenburg	3:08
14.	"Do You Think I'm Sexy?"	André; Rennefeld; Alex Wende	Rennefeld	2:13
15.	"Funny Bear (Goodnight Mix)"	André; Philipp	tonekind	0:57
Total length:				46:04

I Am Your Gummy Bear – CD Bonus tracks
No.	Title	Writer(s)	Producer(s)	Length
16.	"Osito Gominola (Spanish Version)"	Christian André Schneider; Christian Philipp Schneider	tonekind; René Rennefeld	3:12
17.	"Itt Van A Gummimaci (Hungarian Version)"	Christian André Schneider; Christian Philipp Schneider	tonekind; René Rennefeld	3:12

Ich Bin Dein Gummibär – German Bonus tracks
No.	Title	Writer(s)	Producer(s)	Length
12.	"Fummel Fummel Gummibär"	André; Philipp; Korduletsch		3:25
13.	"Buj Buj Polka"	André; Philipp; Blankenburg	tonekind; Blankenburg	3:08
14.	"Do You Think I'm Sexy?"	André; Rennefeld; Wende	Rennefeld	2:13
15.	"Funny Bear (Goodnight Mix)"	André; Philipp	tonekind	0:57
16.	"Ich Bin Dein Gummibär (Polka Mix)"	André; Philipp	tonekind	2:33
17.	"Happy Birthday Gummibär"	André; Korduletsch		2:04

== Charts ==
Chart (2007)	Peak position
Austrian Albums (Ö3 Austria)	52
French Albums (SNEP)	106
Portuguese Albums (AFP)	30
