= Gummibär & Friends: Operation Cotton Candy =

- Early production poster shown at the 2025 Berlin International Film Festival, showing former release date.
- Directed by: Peter Dodd
- Written by: Dan Berlinka and Robert Chandler
- Produced by: P. Jayakumar; Paul Cummins
- Production companies: Toonz Media Group; Gummybear International; Telegael
- Release date: 2027
- Running time: 90 minutes
- Countries: India; Ireland; United Kingdom
- Language: English

Gummibär & Friends: Operation Cotton Candy is an upcoming animated spy comedy film based on the Gummibär character and the television series Gummibär & Friends: The Gummy Bear Show, directed by Peter Dodd, written by Dan Berlinka and Robert Chandler, and produced by P. Jayakumar & Paul Cummins. A production of Toonz Media Group, Gummybear International and Telegael, Gummibär & Friends: Operation Cotton Candy is scheduled to be released in theatres in 2027.

== Premise ==
The film centers on the titular character Gummibär, an anthropomorphic green gummy bear alongside a group of two friends named Kala, a blue cat who is a master of martial arts, and Harry, a green chameleon who studies science. They are recruited by a Covert Government Agency to defeat a set of nefarious villains who are led by Dr. Verde, the antagonist who is determined to erase the color green from the planet, while Gummy thinks he is merely testing cotton candy flavors.

== Production ==
=== Early attempts ===
Development for a second film adaptation starring the Gummibär character would follow some time later after the 2012 direct-to-video animated Christmas comedy film The Yummy Gummy Search for Santa was released, which has been heavily criticized due to its poor production of animation and story.

In February 2014, rumors circulated online that a second Gummibär film was in the works, entitled Gummy Bear 3D: The Movie, which would be produced by Stealth Media Group, Gummybear International, Oscar Generale Productions, and Spice Factory in Montreal. The film was noted for casting the famous American actor John Travolta as the primary voice of Gummibär. The film was scheduled to start production on 29 September 2014, with Stealth Media Group having boarded the $30 million for it. In 2016, the film was revealed to have never been produced, with two of the companies that used to be involved in the production shut down, having misled the public with the budget.

=== Development ===
In late 2024, the film officially started pre-production. Although no detailed information about the project was publicly known, it would not be until Toonz Media Group eventually unveiled a few details regarding the film at the American Film Market as of 1 November 2024. A PDF file that contained other projects Toonz Media Group was also involved in featured a short description of the film. The PDF revealed that the film was originally going to be titled "The Gummibär Movie: Operation Cotton Candy", and was scheduled to be released in theaters in the summer of 2026, but later it got delayed to 2027.

On 13 February 2025, the film was earlier unveiled at the 2025 Berlin International Film Festival (EFM), revealing alongside the first poster that was officially released to the general public. The announcement was later spread online with an exclusive magazine of Variety relating to details on the production of the film. This announcement also revealed that the film was later retitled to Gummibär & Friends: Operation Cotton Candy.

Christian Schneider, CEO, and Jürgen Korduletsch, president of the company Gummybear International, said regarding their involvement with the film: "We're very happy and delighted to once again collaborate with our friends at Toonz to bring the first Gummibär and Friends full length feature film to GB's myriad of fans. It's a great opportunity to continue the successful relationship started with the Gummibär and Friends Series and to present what is sure to be a madcap and chaotic journey for his fans to enjoy."

While P. Jayakumar, CEO of Toonz Media Group, added: "There is no other character that has generated such an enduring global buzz. With Robert, Pete, and Dan at the helm, we are confident that 'Gummibär and Friends' will connect with audiences around the world, taking this iconic franchise to even greater heights."
