= Cho Ka Ka O =

1985 single by Annie Cordy

Single by Annie Cordy
- Released: 1985
- Recorded: 1985
- Length: 3:00
- Label: CBS Records International
- Songwriters: Vivien Vallay; Patrick Bousquet; Pierre Carrel

"Cho Ka Ka O" or "Chaud cacao" ("Hot cocoa") is a song performed by Belgian singer Annie Cordy. The song was written by Vivien Vallay, Patrick Bousquet, and Pierre Carrel. The song was released in France and Belgium in 1985. The song sold more than two and a half million singles worldwide In 2021, the song was criticized for being racist, a claim one of the writers, Vallay, denied.

== Gummibär version ==
"Cho Ka Ka O"

Single by Gummibär

from the album I Am Your Gummy Bear
- Released: 2007
- Recorded: 2007
- Length: 3:09
- Label: Gummybear International
- Songwriter: Pierre Carrel / Patrick Bousquet / Andre Charles Tabutin

Gummibär singles chronology
"I'm a Gummy Bear (The Gummy Bear Song)" (2007)	"Cho Ka Ka O" (2007)	"Itsi Bitsi Bikini" (2008)

=== Background ===
In 2007, German virtual singer Gummibär covered "Cho Ka Ka O (Choco Choco Choco)" for his debut album I Am Your Gummy Bear. This version peaked at number 16 on the French chart.

=== Music video ===
The accompanying music video was released on March 23, 2008, on YouTube, and features Gummibär dreaming of being immersed in a tropical island virtual video game reality. He then gets into a series of mishaps such as being run over and hit by coconuts, getting covered in hot chocolate, and being chased by crabs. He is also shown doing the hula dance. As of September 2023, the song has 280 million views.

== Charts ==
=== Annie Cordy version ===
Chart (1985)	Peak position
France (SNEP)	18

=== Gummibär version ===
Chart (2007–08)	Peak position
Australia Physical Sales Chart (ARIA Charts)	37
France (SNEP)	16

== Cover versions ==
- In 2013, the controversial comedian Dieudonné made a cover of the song by turning the words : this new version, entitled "Shoananas" (in reference to The Holocaust), earned the comedian a sentence to a €28.000 fine for defamation, libel and incitement to hatred and racial discrimination.
- In 2015, Chico & the Gypsies made a cover of the song during the show This is Your Life Annie Cordy.
- In 2017, some lyrics of Cho Ka Ka O featured on Lartiste's song "Chocolat".
