= DJ Casper =

American disc jockey (1965–2023)

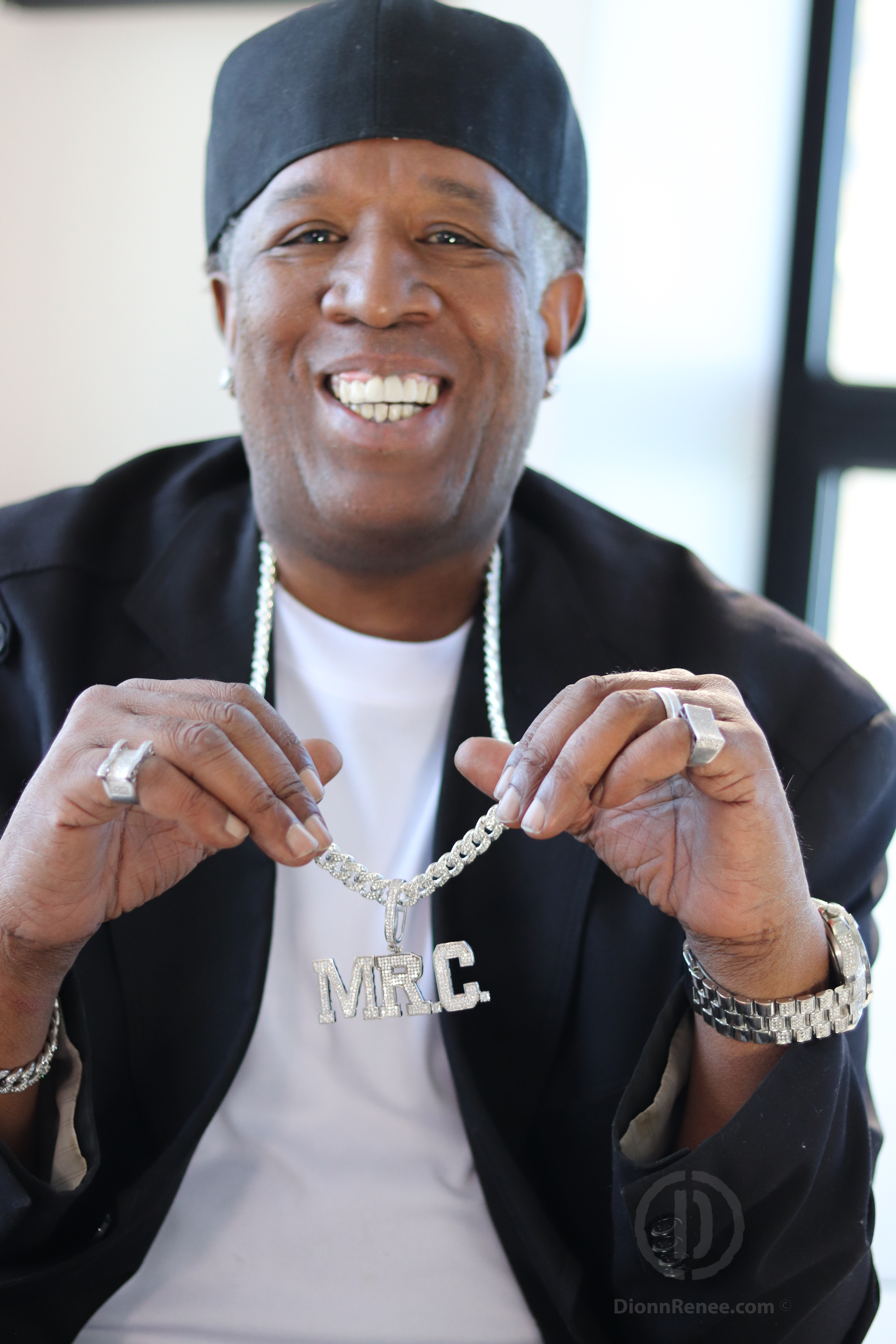

Background information
- Also known as: Mr. C the Slide Man
- Born: William Perry Jr. May 31, 1965; Chicago, Illinois, U.S.
- Died: August 7, 2023 (aged 58) Hazel Crest, Illinois, U.S.
- Genres: Dance; electronic; pop-rap
- Occupations: DJ; hype man; songwriter
- Years active: 1998–2023
- Labels: Island Def Jam; Universal

William Perry Jr. (May 31, 1965 – August 7, 2023), better known as DJ Casper (also known as Mr. C the Slide Man), was an American disc jockey. Born and raised in Chicago, he was known as "Casper" due to frequently being clad in all white attire on stage. He was best known for his 2000 single "Cha Cha Slide".

== Career ==
Perry's first and only hit record, "Casper Slide Pt. 1" – also known as "Cha Cha Slide" – was created by Perry for his nephew, who worked as a personal trainer at a Bally Total Fitness in 1998. After the song grew in popularity as an aerobic exercise at fitness clubs and PE in schools, Casper created a second song in 2000, titled "Casper Slide Pt. 2", which was picked up by Elroy Smith at Chicago's radio station, WGCI-FM.

The song became a hit in Chicago in 2004, when the city's M.O.B. Records record label became involved as well, helping Perry create a whole compilation album with other Chicago-based artists to promote the dance. "Cha Cha Slide" was later picked up by Universal Records and became a global hit, most notably in the United Kingdom, where it topped the UK Singles Chart in March 2004 and became Britain's third best-selling song of 2004.

Perry made an appearance as a DJ in a season 6 episode of Orange Is the New Black, in Crazy Eyes' hallucination of the prisoners and guards line dancing to the Cha Cha Slide.

== Illness and death ==
In January 2016, Perry was diagnosed with kidney cancer and neuroendocrine cancer. After an unsuccessful surgery the same month, he began chemotherapy. In an interview in July 2018, he stated he was in remission. In 2019, Perry stated that he beat his kidney and liver cancers and said he was a changed man, stating "that was God's way of just slowing me down just a little bit."

Perry died of kidney and liver cancer on August 7, 2023, at the age of 58. He was remembered as the Cha Cha Slide creator in national outlets as well as local Chicago media, with radio personality Seandale Hunley declaring Perry a "Chicago icon" and suggesting Perry was dancing the Cha Cha Slide in Heaven: "He up there Cha-Chaing right now, man."

== Discography ==
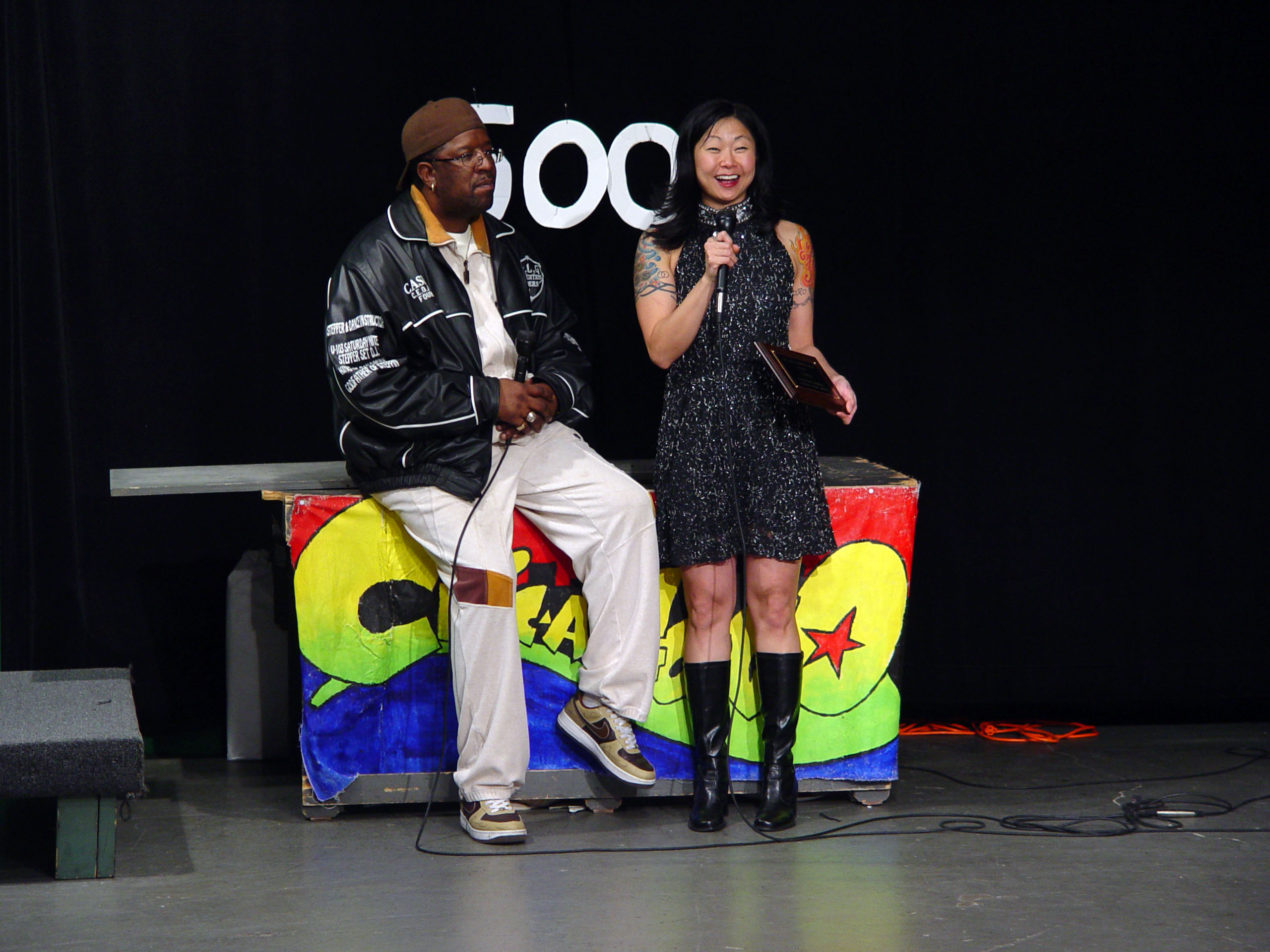
Perry with Mia Park at the taping of the 500th episode of Chic-a-Go-Go.

=== Albums ===
- Out Champ (1999)
- Cha-Cha Slide: The Original Slide Album (2000)
- Casper (2001)

=== Singles ===
List of singles, with selected chart positions, showing year released and album name
Title	Year	Peak chart positions								Album
Title	Year	US	US R&B	AUS	GER	IRE	NL	SWI	UK	Album
"Cha Cha Slide"	2000	83	24	64	83	3	12	86	1	Cha-Cha Slide: The Original Slide Album
"Oops Up Side Your Head"	2004	–	–	–	–	25	–	–	16	Non-album single
