= Gummibär & Friends: The Gummy Bear Show =

- The main characters, left to right: Harry the chameleon, Gummibär, and Kala the cat
- Also known as: Gummy Bear & Friends
- Genre: Comedy; Musical; Animated sitcom
- Created by: Peter Dodd (character Gummy Bear)
- Based on: Gummibär by Christian P. Schneider
- Directed by: Valeriya Kucherenko
- Voices of: Phillipa Alexander; Adam Diggle; Becca Stewart
- Opening theme: "Welcome to the Gummy Bear Show"
- Countries of origin: India; Germany
- No. of seasons: 2
- No. of episodes: 78

Production
- Producer: Santhosh P. Jayakumar
- Production companies: Gummybear International; Toonz Animation India

Original release
- Network: YouTube
- Release: June 24, 2016 – August 26, 2022

Related
- Gummibär & Friends: Operation Cotton Candy

Gummibär & Friends: The Gummy Bear Show is a German-Indian animated television web series based on the Gummibär character and virtual band. Produced by Toonz Animation India and Gummybear International, and directed by Valeriya Kucherenko, the series premiered on YouTube on June 24, 2016, before being exported across the world on April 1, 2020.

== Premise ==
The series centers on a green gummy bear named Gummibär (nicknamed Gummy) who lives with his two friends (who are returning characters from The Yummy Gummy Search for Santa): Harry, a green chameleon who studies science, and Kala, a blue cat who is a master of martial arts. Throughout the series, the three interact with other characters, including Mr. Kronk, Gummy's grouchy rival, and Granny Peters, an elderly scientist who enjoys baking cookies.

== Cast ==
- Phillipa Alexander as Gummy
- Adam Diggle as Harry
- Becca Stewart as Kala

== Episodes ==
=== Series overview ===
Season	Episodes	Originally released	
Season	Episodes	First released	Last released
1	39	June 26, 2016	May 12, 2017
2	39	December 13, 2018	August 26, 2022

=== Season 1 (2016–17) ===
No. overall	No. in season	Title	Directed by	Written by	Original release date	Prod. code
1	1	"Spooktacular"	Unknown	Leopold St Pierre	June 24, 2016	TBA
Gummy and his friends mistake a balloon for a monster, and begin to pursue it.
2	2	"Hamster in the House"	Unknown	Leopold St Pierre	July 8, 2016	TBA
Gummy discovers a giant hamster in his apartment, and then he discovers that he's allergic to hamsters Note: This episode ends with Gummy Bear Song.
3	3	"Robo Gummy"	Unknown	Leopold St Pierre	July 22, 2016	TBA
Gummy orders robot duplicates of himself to do his work for him. Note: This episode ends with Gummy Bear Song.
4	4	"Who Ate It"	Unknown	Leopold St Pierre	August 5, 2016	TBA
When there is only one donut left, Gummy, Kala, and Harry must make it through the night without eating it. Note: This episode ends with Gummy Bear Song.
5	5	"Hiccups"	Unknown	Leopold St Pierre	August 19, 2016	TBA
Gummibär and his friends try to get rid of their hiccups.
6	6	"Macaroni Plant"	Unknown	Leopold St Pierre	September 2, 2016	TBA
Gummy attempts to grow a macaroni plant. Note: This episode ends with Gummy Bear Song.
7	7	"The Contest"	Unknown	Leopold St Pierre	September 16, 2016	TBA
Gummy, Kala, and Harry enter a contest where they have to go as long as possible without expressing any happiness. Note: This episode ends with Gummy Bear Song.
8	8	"Incredible Shrinking Gummy"	Unknown	Leopold St Pierre	October 7, 2016	TBA
Gummy gets shrunk down to a microscopic size and has to find a way to get back to his normal size
9	9	"Happy Maroon Day"	Unknown	Leopold St Pierre	October 14, 2016	TBA
Gummy and Harry celebrate Kala's birthday with her favorite color - maroon. Note: This episode ends with Gummy Bear Song.
10	10	"Kitten Up a Tree"	Unknown	Leopold St Pierre	October 21, 2016	TBA
Gummy, Granny Peters, and Harry try to rescue a cat up a tree. Note: This episode ends with Gummy Bear Song, Kala also heard then.
11	11	"Halloween"	Unknown	Leopold St Pierre	October 28, 2016	TBA
Gummy and his friends attend a Halloween party. Note: Mr. Crab already appears in the last episode The Contest .
12	12	"Stealthy Ninja"	Unknown	Leopold St Pierre	November 4, 2016	TBA
Kala subjects Gummy and Harry to her ninja stealth skills. Note: This episode ends with Gummy Bear Song. According to the episode, It's a Great Summer has been used in the episode.
13	13	"Boring Is a Boring Does"	Unknown	Leopold St Pierre	} November 11, 2016	TBA
Gummy tries to get rid of Harry, Kala, and Granny Peter's boredom.
14	14	"The Happy Puppy"	Unknown	Leopold St Pierre	November 18, 2016	TBA
Gummy gets a goat, who he thinks is a puppy Note: This episode ends with Gummy Bear Song.
15	15	"Ice Ice Gummy"	Unknown	Leopold St Pierre	November 25, 2016	TBA
Gummy's apartment gets ice cold, and he and his friends have to figure out why.
16	16	"Yes Gummy"	Unknown	Leopold St Pierre	December 2, 2016	TBA
Kala and Harry practice karaté, while Gummy challenges himself to accept every opportunity that comes his way... Note: This episode ends with Gummy Bear Song.
17	17	"Crosswalk Guard"	Unknown	Leopold St Pierre	December 9, 2016	TBA
Harry becomes a crosswalk guard and makes it incredibly difficult for Gummy to cross the road. Note: This episode ends with Gummy Bear Song.
18	18	"Sick Day"	Unknown	Leopold St Pierre	December 16, 2016	TBA
Gummy gets sick
19	19	"Merry Christmas"	Unknown	Leopold St Pierre	December 23, 2016	TBA
Gummy and Harry are tasked to deliver Christmas presents for Santa.
20	20	"Prince Gummy"	Unknown	Leopold St Pierre	December 30, 2016	TBA
Gummy discovers that he is the prince of Gummilandia. Note: This episode ends with Gummy Bear Song.
21	21	"Super Gummy"	Unknown	Leopold St Pierre	January 6, 2017	TBA
Gummy discovers that he has super powers and lives out his dream of becoming a superhero. Note: This episode ends with Gummy Bear Song. The Gummy costume references Superman from DC Comics.
22	22	"Creepy Creature of Nightmare Creek"	Unknown	Leopold St Pierre	January 13, 2017	TBA
Gummy and his friends defend their house from (what they think are) ghosts.
23	23	"Camping Trip"	Unknown	Leopold St Pierre	January 20, 2017	TBA
Gummy, Kala and Harry go camping.
24	24	"Fly Me to the Moon"	Unknown	Leopold St Pierre	January 27, 2017	TBA
Gummy tries to live out his dream of travelling to the moon.
25	25	"Gummy's Lucky Day"	Unknown	Leopold St Pierre	February 3, 2017	TBA
Gummy receives a goldfish that starts getting too big for him to handle. Note: This episode ends with Gummy Bear Song.
26	26	"Two Tickets"	Unknown	Leopold St Pierre	February 10, 2017	TBA
Gummy wins two tickets and can't decide who to give the second one to. Note: This episode ends with Gummy Bear Song.
27	27	"The Fly"	Unknown	Leopold St Pierre	February 17, 2017	TBA
Gummy and his friends try to get rid of a fly.
28	28	"Surprise Egg"	Unknown	Leopold St Pierre	February 24, 2017	TBA
Gummy lays an egg Note: This episode ends with Gummy Bear Song, Go for the Goal was also used. This is the most-viewed episode of the series on YouTube, with 51 million views.
29	29	"Sleepwalker"	Unknown	Leopold St Pierre	March 3, 2017	TBA
Gummy can't stop sleepwalking. Note: The characters watch a Pink Panther and Pals episode.
30	30	"Snoring"	Unknown	Leopold St Pierre	March 10, 2017	TBA
Gummy and his friends can't sleep because of someone's snoring.
31	31	"Unboxing, The Unicorn Surprise"	Unknown	Leopold St Pierre	March 17, 2017	TBA
Gummy gives Kala a pleasant surprise by trying to become a unicorn surprise toy Note: This episode ends with Gummy Bear Song.
32	32	"The Violin"	Unknown	Leopold St Pierre	March 24, 2017	TBA
Gummy tries to becomes a professional violinist.
33	33	"Imaginary Friend"	Unknown	Leopold St Pierre	March 31, 2017	TBA
Gummy has an imaginary friend. Note: This episode ends with Gummy Bear Song.
34	34	"Super Organized"	Unknown	Leopold St Pierre	April 7, 2017	TBA
Gummy and Harry learn to be super organized. Note: This episode ends with Gummy Bear Song.
35	35	"Funny Easter Bunny"	Unknown	Leopold St Pierre	April 14, 2017	TBA
Easter has arrived and Gummy and his friends try to search for the Easter Bunny, and end up discovering a cult of chickens who have kidnapped the Easter Bunny and are trying to take his job.
36	36	"Lucky Charm"	Unknown	Leopold St Pierre	April 21, 2017	TBA
Gummy finds a horse charm and believes he can do anything with his newfound luck. Note: This episode ends with Gummy Bear Song.
37	37	"The Magic Lamp"	Unknown	Leopold St Pierre	April 28, 2017	TBA
Gummy gives Harry a mysterious lamp on his birthday that actually contains a hidden Genie. Note: This episode ends with Gummy Bear Song.
38	38	"How to Roller Skate"	Unknown	Leopold St Pierre	May 5, 2017	TBA
Gummy decides to roller skate. Note: This episode ends with Gummy Bear Song. It's Mr. Kronk's first speaking role in the series.
39	39	"The Detective Gummy Bear Mystery"	Unknown	Leopold St Pierre	May 12, 2017	TBA
One of Kala's trophies goes missing, Gummy is tasked to try and find it. Note: This episode ends with Gummy Bear Song.

=== Season 2 (2018–22) ===
In 2018, Toonz Media Group announced a second season of the Gummibär & Friends: The Gummy Bear Show.

Season 2 premiered on December 13, 2018 on YouTube and ended on August 26, 2022.

No. overall	No. in season	Title	Directed by	Written by	Original release date	Prod. code
40	1	"Gummerish"	Unknown	Stephie Theodora	December 13, 2018	TBA
Gummibär wakes up to find he can only speak gibberish.
41	2	"X'Mas Alone"	Unknown	Stephie Theodora	December 24, 2018	TBA
Gummy spends Christmas home alone, tries to defend his apartment from and kill (what he perceives to be) a home intruder. Note: Harry, Kala, Granny Peters, and Mr. Kronk do not appear in this episode.
42	3	"Gumphibian"	Unknown	Stephie Theodora	December 28, 2018	TBA
Gummy discovers he's green, and begins his new life as a frog.
43	4	"Mouse Got Your Tongue"	Unknown	Stephie Theodora	January 12, 2019	TBA
Kala goes crazy over a mouse roaming Gummy's apartment, and it's up to Gummy and Harry to try to end it.
44	5	"X Marks the Not"	Unknown	Unknown	February 2, 2019	TBA
Best batten down the hatches for Gummy the Pizza Pirate be on the way. This salty buccaneer be on the quest for buried treasure - a bounty of pineapple pepperoni pizza! Ready for an adventure?
45	6	"Night of the Living Leftovers"	Unknown	Unknown	February 16, 2019	TBA
Gummy microwaves his leftovers with his radioactive microwave, that he has, and it becomes a food monster. Gummy and his friends must now try to hunt it down.
46	7	"Bowl More"	Unknown	Unknown	March 9, 2019	TBA
Gummy receives a bowling bowl and decides to make a sad attempt at bowling.
47	8	"The Record"	Unknown	Unknown	March 23, 2019	TBA
Gummy, Kala and Harry are on a quest to break a world record - to build the world's largest ice cream sundae. Harry's middle name is confirmed as Jarvis in this episode.
48	9	"Gummolepsy"	Unknown	Stephie Theodora	April 16, 2019	TBA
Gummy seeks to beat Granny Peters' stock car racing record, but he develops insomnia from having not slept during the construction of his car. Unlike what this episode's title would imply, this episode has absolutely nothing to do with the medical disorder of epilepsy.
49	10	"Saving Mr. Kronk"	Unknown	Unknown	April 20, 2019	TBA
After Mr. Kronk saves Gummy's life, Gummy insists on returning the favor in any way possible.
50	11	"The Return of the Alien"	Unknown	Unknown	May 4, 2019	TBA
The alien returns.
51	12	"Banzai as Kite"	Unknown	Unknown	June 1, 2019	TBA
Gummy challenges himself to design the greatest kite ever. He does not.
52	13	"Mirror Mirror"	Unknown	Unknown	June 15, 2019	TBA
Gummy meets his psychotic mirror twin.
53	14	"Ready Pancake One"	Unknown	Stephie Theodora	August 10, 2019	TBA
Gummy, Kala, and Harry volunteer to work at Mr. Kronk's creperie, much to Kronk's annoyance
54	15	"Gummy's Cloudy Day"	Unknown	Unknown	August 24, 2019	TBA
Gummy messes with the wrong cloud.
55	16	"Buzzy Sitting"	Unknown	Unknown	September 28, 2019	TBA
Harry and Gummy have to get rid of bees. Note: Kala did not appear in the episode
56	17	"Hairy Harry"	Unknown	Unknown	October 12, 2019	TBA
Harry, Gummy and Kala end up growing lots of hair.
57	18	"It's a Gummy Life"	Unknown	Unknown	October 26, 2019	TBA
Gummy decides to make a movie about his life.
58	19	"Crack a Smile"	Unknown	Unknown	December 27, 2019	TBA
Gummy finds a new metallic friend who stays perfectly still. His friend's can't figure out whether it's a real person or just a statue.
59	20	"Dancing on the Ceiling"	Unknown	Stephie Theodora	February 1, 2020	TBA
Gummy steals Granny Peter's anti-gravity machine. The title of the episode references Lionel Richie song Dancing on the Ceiling, it was also a song of the "Season One soundtrack".
60	21	"Gummy's Jinx"	Unknown	Unknown	March 28, 2020	TBA
Gummy, Kala and Harry are stuck in a jinx! Will not being able to speak drive them bananas?
61	22	"Hypno Kronk"	Unknown	Stephie Theodora	May 8, 2020	TBA
Gummy has some fun testing out his brand new Hypno-Spinner on his grumpy neighbor, Mr. Kronk.
62	23	"Wheelchaired"	Unknown	Unknown	June 19, 2020	TBA
After Gummy hurts his toe the doctor gives him a wheelchair to help him recover.
63	24	"Everyone Outta the Pool"	Unknown	Unknown	July 24, 2020	TBA
Gummy gets his friends ready for a day of swimming and fun.
64	25	"Remote Gummy"	Unknown	Unknown	September 17, 2020	TBA
Gummy takes control over his friends with the help of a magic remote.
65	26	"Ride'Em Gumboy"	Unknown	Unknown	December 24, 2020	TBA
Gummibär becomes a cowboy and throws a rootin' tootin' rodeo!
66	27	"Peak-a-Boo"	Unknown	Unknown	January 29, 2021	TBA
Gummy is on a quest to become invisible, but will his super duper invisible machine work? It's the first time that Gummy takes off all his clothes at the end of the episode, but the episode isn't censored.
67	28	"Dr. Jekyll & Mr. Harry"	Unknown	Unknown	February 19, 2021	TBA
Is that a scary monster....or Harry?!
68	29	"The Lose Puppy"	Unknown	Unknown	April 9, 2021	TBA
Gummy finds a lost puppy! But where did he come from? The episode title The Lose Puppy summarises that Gummy helps the little dog, but in the 2016 episode "The Happy Puppy" summaries that Gummy helps a goat but he is confused then with a puppy.
69	30	"Gummy The Ghost Hunter"	Unknown	Unknown	May 14, 2021	TBA
There's a ghost in the apartment! Will Gummy be able to catch it?
70	31	"Stuck on You"	Unknown	Unknown	June 25, 2021	TBA
Gummy and Harry are stuck together with Super Duper Glue.
71	32	"Pied Gummy"	Unknown	Unknown	July 23, 2021	TBA
Gummy tries to becomes a musical artist.
72	33	"You Snooze You Lose"	Unknown	Unknown	September 3, 2021	TBA
73	34	"Wholly Cow"	Unknown	Unknown	October 8, 2021	TBA
74	35	"Unhappy Campers"	Unknown	Unknown	December 3, 2021	TBA
75	36	"Go North Young Gummy"	Unknown	Unknown	December 17, 2021	TBA
76	37	"Unhealthy Selfie"	Unknown	Unknown	January 21, 2022	TBA
Gummy does selfies.
77	38	"Factory Rejects"	Unknown	Unknown	March 25, 2022	TBA
78	39	"Raiders of the Lost Gummy"	Unknown	Unknown	August 26, 2022	TBA

== Broadcast ==
=== International ===
Country	Airdates (Note: This information represents the YouTube episodes' airdates, not their TV airdates.)	Language	Channel
China	August 28, 2020 – October 24, 2020 (Season 1)	Chinese; Mandarin	CCTV-14; YouTube
Germany	January 23, 2021 – April 28, 2025 (Season 1)	German	YouTube
Hungary	April 1, 2020 – May 9, 2020 (Season 1)	Hungarian	YouTube
India	July 13, 2020 – August 23, 2020 (Season 1)	Hindi	YouTube
Israel	– (Note: Hebrew dub isn't available on Gummy Bear Show International YouTube channel but is available on Arutz HaYeladim.)	Hebrew	Arutz HaYeladim (2020–21) (1)
	_ (Note: Urdu dub isn't available on Gummy Bear Show International YouTube channel but is available on Toons PAK YouTube channel.)	Urdu	YouTube
Russia	May 11, 2020 – June 18, 2020 (Season 1)	Russian	Малыш ТВ (20??–2022) YouTube
Spain/Mexico	August 1, 2020 – July 16, 2021 (Season 1); September 2, 2022 – present (Season 2)	Spanish	YouTube
Thailand	– (Note: Thai dub isn't available on Gummy Bear Show International YouTube channel but is available on True Spark Jump and TrueVisions Now.)	Thai	True Spark Jump (2023–present); TrueVisions Now TrueID
Turkey	– (Note: Turkish dub isn't available on Gummy Bear Show International YouTube channel but is available on Gummy ve Arkadaşları - Türkçe YouTube channel.)	Turkish	YouTube
United States	July 26, 2016 – May 12, 2017 (Season 1); December 13, 2018 – August 26, 2022 (Season 2)	English	YouTube

== Other media ==
=== Toys and merchandise ===
Gummybear International sells a variety of products based on the show's episodes and characters.

== Soundtrack ==
The Gummy Bear Show: Season One Soundtrack

Soundtrack album by Gummibär
- Released: August 17, 2018
- Recorded: 2016–2018
- Genre: Television soundtrack
- Length: 40:21
- Label: Gummybear International

Gummibär chronology
Party Pop (2015)	The Gummy Bear Show: Season One Soundtrack (2018)	The Gummy Bear Album (2019)

The Gummy Bear Show: Season One Soundtrack is the official soundtrack to the first season of Gummibär & Friends, credited to animated character Gummibär. The album features 40 songs from the show.

Track list

Track lengths per Amazon Music.

No.	Title	Length
1.	"Welcome to the Gummy Bear Show (Theme Song)"	0:31
2.	"Spooky (Ready or Not)"	0:48
3.	"Achoo Gesundheit"	1:09
4.	"Robo Gummy"	0:47
5.	"Who Ate It?"	0:49
6.	"I've Got the Hiccups"	1:05
7.	"Macaroni Tree"	0:50
8.	"Don't Ha Ha"	0:49
9.	"Lilliput"	0:56
10.	"Maroon Maroonba"	0:52
11.	"Kitten Up a Tree"	1:09
12.	"Monster on the Loose"	1:05
13.	"It's a Great Summer"	0:50
14.	"Everything Is Boring"	1:01
15.	"I Love My Puppy"	1:03
16.	"Ice Ice Gummy"	1:05
17.	"No More No, No, No"	1:00
18.	"Crossing the Line"	1:11
19.	"Ring Goes the Bell"	1:07
20.	"Santa's Little Helpers"	1:21
21.	"It's Good to Be a Prince"	1:06
22.	"I'm a Super Gummy"	0:48
23.	"Everything Is Scary"	1:01
24.	"Let's Go Camping"	0:57
25.	"Fly Me to the Moon"	1:12
26.	"Mini, Mini, Mini"	0:50
27.	"Dancing on the Ceiling"	1:05
28.	"Buzz Buzz Goes the Fly"	1:02
29.	"Go for the Goal"	1:00
30.	"Sleep Sleepwalking"	1:02
31.	"Snoring"	0:59
32.	"Life Is Just a Bag of Tricks"	0:54
33.	"Fiddle Diddle"	1:02
34.	"He's My Imaginary Friend"	1:22
35.	"Plan Gummy"	1:04
36.	"KikiRiki"	0:53
37.	"I'm Feelin' Lucky Today"	1:03
38.	"Shazam (Open Sesame)"	1:19
39.	"Love to Roll, Roll, Roll"	1:12
40.	"Calling Sherlock Gummybear"	1:02
Total length:		40:21
