= S3RL =

Australian hardcore DJ, producer and singer

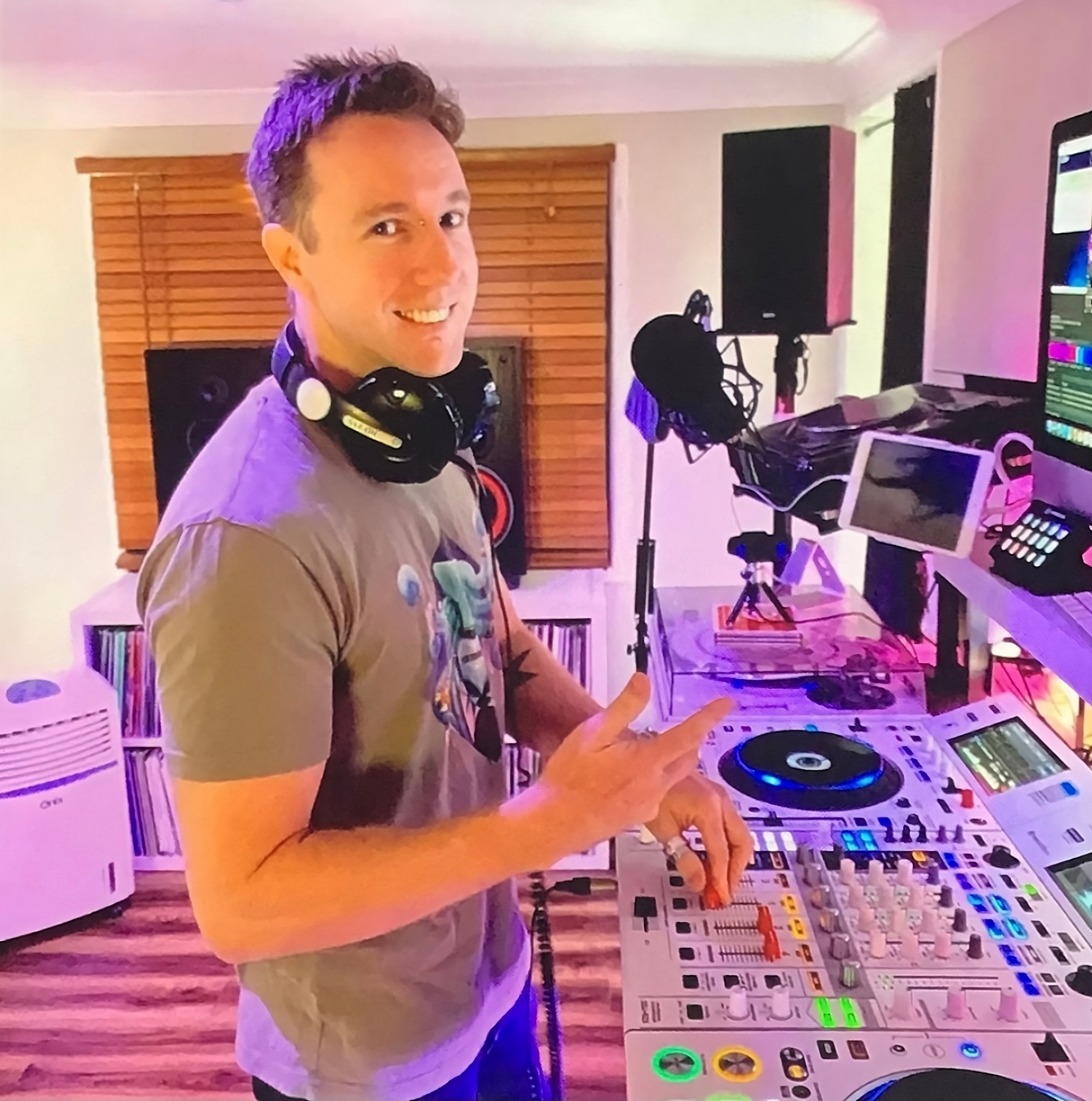
- S3RL in 2020

Background information
- Born: Jole Richard Hughes; 17 December 1981 (age 44); Brisbane, Queensland, Australia
- Genres: Happy hardcore, UK hardcore
- Occupations: DJ, record producer, singer
- Years active: 2006–present
- Labels: EMFA Music, Em4 Music, Nu Energy, Relentless, Executive Records
- Website: djs3rl.com

Jole Richard Hughes (born 17 December 1981), known professionally as S3RL, is an Australian happy hardcore and UK hardcore DJ, record producer and singer from Brisbane. He is best known for "Pretty Rave Girl", "MTC" and "Bass Slut". His 2014 single "Genre Police" reached number 10 on the Norwegian singles chart in 2015. His songs often reference Japanese popular culture. In 2011 he founded the record label EMFA Music. After touring internationally for about a decade, he stopped performing live at the end of 2018 and returned in 2025, as his older music found new audiences online.

== Early life and beginnings ==
Hughes became interested in dance music after hearing Alice Deejay's "Better Off Alone", and set out to make similar music at a faster tempo. He began producing around 1999, teaching himself on the PlayStation program Music 2000 before moving to Reason on a PC. He was a raver before he became a DJ, going to his first club night in 2001 and his first rave in 2002.

According to Hughes, the name "S3RL" comes from a childhood nickname: his cousins wanted to call him "arsehole" but were not allowed to swear, so they softened it to "arserl", and the name stuck.

At the end of 2005, the UK hardcore DJ Kevin Energy heard Hughes's demo CD during a visit to Australia and signed him to his label group, the Nu Energy Collective. His first track, "Transformers", was released on vinyl in 2006. He began DJing the same year.

== Career ==
=== 2006–2010: Early releases ===
Between 2006 and 2010 Hughes released music on several hardcore labels, including Relentless, Executive Records, Nu Energy and Australia With Force. His tracks also appeared on compilations such as Bonkers, Hardcore Underground and Masif Hardcore.

"Pretty Rave Girl" (2008) became one of his best-known tracks. Hughes wrote the lyrics to the melody of Daddy DJ's song "Daddy DJ", reworked as fast hardcore. He has said the track had been turned down elsewhere before Kevin Energy signed it, and that he almost deleted it before posting it on Myspace, where it spread widely.

In December 2009 Hughes played Freeformation in London. During the trip he stayed with Kevin Energy, with whom he made a track, and spent several nights with Sharkey. In June 2010 he played Hardcore Till I Die's HTID in the Sun event in Lloret de Mar, Spain, and in October 2010 he DJed at the first Bam! Festival at Ivory's Rock in Queensland. By the early 2010s he had also performed in New Zealand, the United States, the UK and Europe.

=== 2011–2018: EMFA Music ===
In 2011 Hughes founded his own label, EMFA Music. Alongside "Pretty Rave Girl", EDM Identity lists "Bass Slut" and "MTC" among the tracks that brought him wide success, and Music Story describes "MTC" and "Pika Girl" as international dance hits. In 2011 he toured the United States, with shows in Seattle, Houston, Los Angeles and Phoenix. Most of his touring between about 2009 and 2018 was in the US, and in 2018 he said that about 90 per cent of his fan base was there.

"Genre Police" (featuring Lexi) was released in November 2014, and in May 2015 it peaked at number 10 on Norway's VG-lista chart, where it spent eight weeks. In January 2017 he was named a Featured Artist for the rhythm game osu!. EMFA's 100th release, "What Is a DJ?", a collaboration with Seattle DJ Jimni Cricket, followed in May 2018.

In February 2018 Hughes announced that after that year he would not perform for at least a couple of years. His final US date before the break was a farewell show, "Sayonara", in Los Angeles on 3 November 2018; EDM Identity reported that he was stepping back from touring to focus on his family.

=== 2019–present: Hiatus and return ===
Hughes kept releasing music while he was not performing, including 11 new songs in 2020. In 2021 he remixed Dorian Electra's "M'Lady" (featuring Kero Kero Bonito), and in April 2022 he released "Notice Me", featuring Electra and Nikolett. A 2022 Vice article on Australia's happy hardcore scene listed him alongside Krystal Ravegirl, TeddyLoid and Dave Psi as artists who reworked hardcore with anime samples.

Hughes, who is married with children, said in 2022 that he had stepped away from touring to be at home while his children were young, and that he was thinking about returning. In 2022 he created a sublabel, Em4 Music (originally M4 Music) which features "artists from around the world remixing S3RL tracks into a variety of genres".

On 25 January 2025 he returned to live performance at Hardcore Till I Die (HTID) Australia at the Sydney Showground. He was booked for further Australian events in 2026, including Culture Festival and Neko Nation. EDM Identity also reported renewed online interest in his music: his catalogue spread on TikTok, his songs were used in Beat Saber levels, and the ten-year-old track "Trillium" went viral. In 2026 he released 20 Years of S3RL, a triple-CD compilation of 88 tracks split into "Raver", "DJ" and "Producer" eras and limited to 950 copies.

== Musical style ==
Hughes's music falls within happy hardcore and UK hardcore. His lyrics often refer to Japanese pop culture and are frequently "cringe" or satirical. He produces mainly in Reason and releases free remix packs of his tracks so that other producers can build on them. His music has been used in rhythm games including osu! and Beat Saber.

== Discography ==
=== Charted singles ===
Year	Title	NOR
2014	"Genre Police" (feat. Lexi)	10

=== Releases ===
Year	Title	Release	Label
2006	"Transformers"	The Nu Breed EP Vol 2	Relentless Vinyl
2007	"Keep on Ravin' Baby"	Single	Executive Digital
2007	"The 2nd Wave"	Single	Executive Digital
2007	"Blast the Noise"	Single	Executive Digital
2007	"Weekend Has Come"	Single	Executive Digital
2007	"I Kiss"	Single	Relentless Digital
2007	"Neon Genesis"	Single	Relentless Digital
2007	"S.L.U.T."	Single	Executive Digital
2007	"Feel the Flow"	Single	Executive Digital
2007	"Alternate"	Single	Relentless Digital
2007	"720 Suicide" (with Wovn)	Single	Relentless Digital
2007	"Stay"	"Stay" / "God Is Not a DJ"	Executive Records
2007	"God Is Not a DJ"	"Stay" / "God Is Not a DJ"	Executive Records
2008	"Come On Do It"	Single	Executive Digital
2008	"DEVIL"	Single	Executive Digital
2008	"Crank It Louder"	Single	Executive Digital
2008	"Artificial Energy" (feat. Amy)	Single	Executive Digital
2008	"What We Do"	Single	Executive Digital
2008	"Come Back Home" (with Smartyz)	Single	Executive Digital
2008	"Make You Move"	"Make You Move" / "You'll Never" / "Take Me"	Relentless Digital
2008	"You'll Never"	"Make You Move" / "You'll Never" / "Take Me"	Relentless Digital
2008	"Take Me"	"Make You Move" / "You'll Never" / "Take Me"	Relentless Digital
2008	"Weekend"	"Weekend" / "Into Overdrive" / "Pretty Rave Girl"	Relentless Vinyl
2008	"Into Overdrive"	"Weekend" / "Into Overdrive" / "Pretty Rave Girl"	Relentless Vinyl
2008	"Pretty Rave Girl"	"Weekend" / "Into Overdrive" / "Pretty Rave Girl"	Relentless Vinyl
2009	"I'll Dance with You" (with JessKah)	Single	Executive Digital
2009	"3 to the Floor"	Single	Executive Digital
2009	"Go Wild"	Single	Executive Digital
2009	"Birds & Bees"	Single	Executive Digital
2009	"Here We Go" (with Tamika, feat. Amy)	"Here We Go" / "Freakshow" / "It's Time 2 Roll"	Relentless Vinyl
2009	"Freakshow"	"Here We Go" / "Freakshow" / "It's Time 2 Roll"	Relentless Vinyl
2009	"It's Time 2 Roll"	"Here We Go" / "Freakshow" / "It's Time 2 Roll"	Relentless Vinyl
2009	"We All Scream"	"We All Scream" / "Rave Forever" / "Break Em"	Relentless Vinyl
2009	"Rave Forever" (with Tamika)	"We All Scream" / "Rave Forever" / "Break Em"	Relentless Vinyl
2009	"Break Em"	"We All Scream" / "Rave Forever" / "Break Em"	Relentless Vinyl
2009	"Little Kandi Raver"	"Little Kandi Raver" / "Dealer" / "Le Rock"	Relentless Vinyl
2009	"Dealer"	"Little Kandi Raver" / "Dealer" / "Le Rock"	Relentless Vinyl
2009	"Le Rock"	"Little Kandi Raver" / "Dealer" / "Le Rock"	Relentless Vinyl
2009	"I Live for the Bass Drum"	The S3RL Digital EP 3	Executive Digital
2009	"Move with You" (feat. JessKah)	The S3RL Digital EP 3	Executive Digital
2009	"Remember My Past" (with Luminate & Whiskey)	The S3RL Digital EP 3	Executive Digital
2009	"Everybody Sing"	Single	Australia With Force
2009	"Zorba's Dance (Family Guy Mix)"	Single	Australia With Force
2009	"One 2 Tha 3"	Single	Australia With Force
2009	"The Hardcore Sound"	"The Hardcore Sound" / "Seek & Destroy"	Relentless Digital
2010	"Here's Jonathan"	Single	Recycled Records
2010	"Keep on Ravin' Baby - VIP Mix"	Single	Executive Records
2010	"Pretty Rave Girl 2010"	Single	Relentless Digital
2010	"My Lucky Star"	S3RL EP	Relentless Digital
2010	"How Do U Like Bass?"	S3RL EP	Relentless Digital
2010	"Martini's and Mixed Feelings" (feat. Millionaires)	S3RL EP	Relentless Digital
2010	"In My Life"	"In My Life" / "Line of Blow" / "Just Fcuk"	Nu Energy
2010	"Line of Blow" (feat. J Bigga)	"In My Life" / "Line of Blow" / "Just Fcuk"	Nu Energy
2010	"Just Fcuk" (feat. Fretman)	"In My Life" / "Line of Blow" / "Just Fcuk"	Nu Energy
2010	"Welcome to 2morrow"	The S3RL Digital EP 4	Executive Digital
2010	"Rainbow Girl" (with Tamika)	The S3RL Digital EP 4	Executive Digital
2010	"Middle of the Night" (feat. Kimberley Bowden)	Single	Australia With Force
2010	"T-T-Techno" (with JessKah)	"T-T-Techno" / "Every Single Day" / "Stomp Ya Feet"	Relentless Digital
2010	"Every Single Day" (with JessKah)	"T-T-Techno" / "Every Single Day" / "Stomp Ya Feet"	Relentless Digital
2010	"Stomp Ya Feet"	"T-T-Techno" / "Every Single Day" / "Stomp Ya Feet"	Relentless Digital
2010	"My Transition" (with Kevin Energy)	"My Transition" / "Say My Name Bitch"	Nu Energy
2010	"Say My Name Bitch" (with Kevin Energy)	"My Transition" / "Say My Name Bitch"	Nu Energy
2010	"Every Time I Look at You" (with JessKah)	"Every Time I Look at You" / "Green Hills" / "Sek-C Raver"	Nu Energy
2010	"Green Hills" (with Auscore)	"Every Time I Look at You" / "Green Hills" / "Sek-C Raver"	Nu Energy
2010	"Sek-C Raver" (with JessKah)	"Every Time I Look at You" / "Green Hills" / "Sek-C Raver"	Nu Energy
2010	"BeatDrop Music 2010"	Single	EMFA Free
2011	"Can't Bring Me Down" (feat. Ellie)	The S3RL Digital EP 5	Executive Digital
2011	"Snow White Line" (with Tamika)	The S3RL Digital EP 5	Executive Digital
2011	"Don't Stop" (with Jodie)	The S3RL Digital EP 5	Executive Digital
2011	"Bass Slut"	"Bass Slut" / "It Went" / "Crazy Ass Bitch"	Nu Energy
2011	"It Went" (feat. JessKah)	"Bass Slut" / "It Went" / "Crazy Ass Bitch"	Nu Energy
2011	"Crazy Ass Bitch" (feat. Kato)	"Bass Slut" / "It Went" / "Crazy Ass Bitch"	Nu Energy
2011	"Through the Years" (with Zero-2)	Single	Raven Records
2011	"Mozart on Crack"	Hardcore Energy 2	Nu Energy
2011	"Get Stronger"	Hardcore Energy 2	Nu Energy
2011	"Good Night"	Hardcore Energy 2	Nu Energy
2011	"Let You Go"	The Ultimate S3RL EP	Nu Energy
2011	"The Wilhelm Scream"	The Ultimate S3RL EP	Nu Energy
2011	"Elf the World"	The Ultimate S3RL EP	Nu Energy
2011	"Addict"	Single	Relentless Digital
2011	"Finish Him"	Single	Cloud 9 Recordings
2011	"Always Picking on Me"	Single	The System
2011	"Pika Girl"	Single	EMFA Music
2011	"SummerBass" (feat. Tamika)	Single	EMFA Music
2011	"Same Never Changed" (feat. Tamika)	Single	EMFA Music
2011	"Happy Hardcore Tonight"	Single	EMFA Music
2011	"Better Off Alone" (feat. Tamika)	Single	EMFA Music
2011	"Song Without Words"	Single	EMFA Music
2011	"Kamehameha" (feat. j0hnny)	Single	EMFA Music
2012	"Want It Harder" (feat. Sara)	Single	EMFA Music
2012	"MTC"	Single	EMFA Music
2012	"Ready for Love" (feat. Sara)	Single	EMFA Music
2012	"Time 2 Burn"	Single	EMFA Music
2012	"Press Play Walk Away" (with SynthWulf)	Single	EMFA Music
2012	"Space Invader" (feat. Sara)	Single	EMFA Music
2012	"9 Bars of Equador"	Single	EMFA Music
2012	"Shoulder Boulders"	Single	The System
2012	"Little Kandi Raver 2012" (feat. Sara)	Single	EMFA Music
2012	"Feel the Melody" (feat. Sara)	Single	EMFA Music
2012	"Raver Dimension" (feat. Emcee M)	Single	EMFA Music
2012	"Less Than Three" (feat. Sara)	Single	EMFA Music
2012	"Pump Up the Jams" (with Zero2)	Single	EMFA Music
2013	"Viva Forever" (feat. Sara)	Single	EMFA Music
2013	"Request" (feat. Mixie Moon)	Single	EMFA Music
2013	"Go Insane" (feat. MC Offside)	Single	EMFA Music
2013	"Let the Beat Go" (feat. j0hnny)	Single	EMFA Music
2013	"Princess Bubblegum" (feat. Yuki)	Single	EMFA Music
2013	"Doof Doof Untz Untz"	Single	EMFA Music
2013	"Feels Like Heaven" (feat. MoiMinnie)	Single	EMFA Music
2013	"To My Dream" (feat. Sara)	Single	EMFA Music
2013	"Da De Da" (feat. j0hnny)	Single	EMFA Music
2013	"I Will Pick You Up" (feat. Tamika)	Single	EMFA Music
2013	"DJ Whore" (feat. Tamika)	Single	EMFA Music
2013	"Friendzoned" (feat. Mixie Moon & MC Offside)	Single	EMFA Music
2013	"Forever" (feat. Sara)	Single	EMFA Music
2014	"Back Track" (feat. Akima.T)	Single	EMFA Music
2014	"Dumbass Statuses" (feat. Filthy Frank)	Single	EMFA Music
2014	"I'll See You Again" (feat. Chi Chi)	Single	EMFA Music
2014	"Mr. Vain" (feat. Tamika)	Single	EMFA Music
2014	"Shell Shock"	Single	EMFA Music
2014	"The Legend of Link" (feat. Mixie Moon)	Single	EMFA Music
2014	"Over the Rainbow" (feat. Akima.T)	Single	EMFA Music
2014	"Nightcore This" (feat. Tamika)	Single	EMFA Music
2014	"MTC2" (feat. Sonika)	Single	EMFA Music
2014	"Tell Me What You Want" (feat. Tamika)	Single	EMFA Music
2014	"Public Service Announcement"	Single	EMFA Music
2014	"Genre Police" (feat. Lexi)	Single	EMFA Music
2014	"BFF"	Single	EMFA Music
2014	"Flame Princess" (feat. Krystal)	Single	EMFA Free
2015	"Yeah Science"	Single	EMFA Music
2015	"Escape" (feat. Emi)	Single	EMFA Music
2015	"R4V3 B0Y" (feat. Krystal)	Single	EMFA Music
2015	"Old Stuff" (feat. Minto)	Single	EMFA Music
2015	"Hypnotoad"	Single	EMFA Music
2015	"Catchit"	Single	EMFA Music
2015	"Casual N00b"	Single	EMFA Music
2015	"When I Die" (feat. Razor Sharp & Krystal)	Single	EMFA Music
2015	"Candy" (feat. Sara)	Single	EMFA Music
2015	"Next Time" (feat. Zoe VanWest)	Single	EMFA Music
2015	"Intensify"	Single	EMFA Music
2015	"Crystal Sky"	Single	EMFA Music
2015	"Hentai"	Single	EMFA Music
2015	"Upper Hand 2016" (feat. Lexi)	Single	Upper Hand 2016
2016	"Starlight Starbright" (feat. Emi & Razor Sharp)	Single	EMFA Music
2016	"Put Your Phones Up" (feat. Minto)	Single	EMFA Music
2016	"Forbidden" (feat. Avanna)	Single	EMFA Music
2016	"Self-Titled"	Single	EMFA Music
2016	"When I'm There" (feat. Nikolett)	Single	EMFA Music
2016	"Chillcore" (feat. Lexi)	Single	EMFA Music
2016	"Nostalgic" (feat. Harri Rush)	Single	EMFA Music
2016	"Click Bait" (feat. Gl!tch)	Single	EMFA Music
2016	"You're My Superhero" (feat. Zoe VanWest)	Single	EMFA Music
2016	"Can't Control My Body"	Single	EMFA Music
2016	"Trillium" (feat. Sara)	Single	EMFA Music
2016	"Space-Time" (feat. Riddle Anne)	Single	EMFA Music
2016	"Generic Holiday Song" (feat. Sara)	Single	EMFA Music
2017	"Inspiration"	Single	EMFA Music
2017	"Like This" (feat. Krystal)	Single	EMFA Music
2017	"Where Did You Go" (feat. Charlotte)	Single	EMFA Music
2017	"Boomerang" (feat. Lexi)	Ravestars (compilation)	Future State Music
2017	"Cherry Pop" (feat. Gl!tch)	Single	EMFA Music
2017	"All That I Need" (feat. Kayliana & MC Riddle)	Single	EMFA Music
2017	"Well, That Was Awkward"	Single	EMFA Music
2017	"Green Hills 2017" (with Auscore)	Single	EMFA Music
2017	"Misleading Title" (feat. Defi Brilator)	Single	EMFA Music
2017	"Music Is My Saviour" (feat. Mixie Moon)	Single	EMFA Music
2017	"Spoiler Alert"	Single	EMFA Music
2017	"Whirlwind" (feat. Krystal)	Single	EMFA Music
2017	"Jaded AF" (feat. ChiyoKo & MC Riddle)	Single	EMFA Music
2018	"Through the Years 2018" (with Zero-2, feat. Yurino)	Single	EMFA Music
2018	"MTC Saga"	Single	EMFA Music
2018	"Planet Rave" (feat. Renee)	Single	EMFA Music
2018	"Now That I've Found You" (feat. Déja)	Single	EMFA Music
2018	"Never Let You Go" (feat. Eufeion & Harri Rush)	Single	Ninja Hardcore
2018	"What Is a DJ?" (feat. Jimni Cricket)	Single	EMFA Music
2018	"Berserk" (feat. Iceman)	Single	EMFA Music
2018	"It's This Again" (feat. Jamie-Rose)	Single	EMFA Music
2018	"Beat All the Odds" (feat. Kitty & Lovely)	Single	EMFA Music
2018	"Earth B♭" (feat. Lexi)	Single	EMFA Music
2018	"Scary Movie"	Single	EMFA Music
2018	"Silicon XX" (feat. Nikolett)	Single	EMFA Music
2019	"Ravers MashUp"	Single	EMFA Music
2019	"The Perfect Rave" (feat. Krystal)	Single	EMFA Music
2019	"The Power of Love" (feat. StarStruck)	Single	EMFA Music
2019	"Avaline" (with Triple Zero, feat. Lindsey Marie)	Single	EMFA Music
2019	"And I'm Like" (Outforce & Hartshorn)	Single	EMFA Music
2019	"My Girlfriend Is a Raver" (with LIDA)	Single	EMFA Music
2019	"Ghosted DJ" (NeoQor & S3RL, feat. Kitty Chan)	Single	Qor Values
2019	"Speechless"	Single	EMFA Music
2019	"Fan Service"	Single	EMFA Music
2019	"I Wanna Stay" (with Rob IYF, feat. Krystal)	Single	EMFA Music
2019	"Again" (with DK)	Single	EMFA Music
2019	"Fire" (Krystal, S3RL & Harri Rush)	Single	EMFA Music
2019	"Waifu" (with Alaguan)	Single	EMFA Music
2019	"Dance More" (with Ella)	Single	EMFA Music
2020	"Sky Rocket" (with Sara)	Single	EMFA Music
2020	"You Are Mine" (feat. Kayliana)	Single	EMFA Music
2020	"Nasty" (with 5H4RK80Y, feat. Thylie)	Single	EMFA Music
2020	"MTC Saga Final Chapter"	Single	EMFA Music
2020	"Dopamine" (feat. Sara)	Single	EMFA Music
2020	"Wanna Fight Huh?"	Single	EMFA Music
2020	"The Bass & the Melody"	Single	EMFA Music
2020	"Moonlit Eyes" (Fracus & Darwin vs. S3RL)	Single	Music Blocks Media
2020	"Predictable Rave Song" (feat. Tamika)	Single	EMFA Music
2020	"Untouchable" (feat. Sara & Lida)	Single	EMFA Music
2020	"Punch the Gas" (feat. Brisk)	Single	EMFA Music
2021	"Party with Us" (feat. Slen-D)	Single	EMFA Music
2021	"Won't Let You Go" (feat. Chi-Chi)	Single	EMFA Music
2021	"That Feelin" (with Kayliana)	Single	EMFA Music
2021	"Schadenfreude"	Single	EMFA Music
2021	"This One Goes Out to You"	Single	EMFA Music
2021	"Endless Summer" (with DJ Satomi, feat. Ukiko)	Single	Little Dream
2021	"Tripping on Mushrooms" (feat. Krystal)	Single	EMFA Music
2021	"Not Alone" (feat. Ella)	Single	EMFA Music
2021	"Heart Thief" (with HBz, feat. Lexi)	Single	HBZ Music
2021	"Cum Say Henlo" (with GPF)	Single	EMFA Music
2021	"To Your Beat" (with Hannah Fortune)	Single	EMFA Music
2021	"ФЭС" (with Lida)	Single	DNK Music
2021	"Otaku Boy"	Single	EMFA Music
2021	"Back of the Macca's" (with Slen-D)	Single	EMFA Music
2022	"History Maker" (with Brisk, feat. Tamika)	Single	EMFA Music
2022	"Notice Me" (feat. Dorian Electra & Nikolett)	Single	EMFA Music
2022	"I Feel Alive" (feat. IgikoPop)	Single	EMFA Music
2022	"Doki Doki ドキドキ" (feat. Kawaiiconic)	Single	EMFA Music
2022	"Random Encounter" (feat. NeoQor & IC3MANIA)	Single	EMFA Music
2022	"Break The Music" (with Vau Boy)	Single	BoltMusic
2022	"This One Goes Out To You"	Single	EMFA Music
2022	"Let Go" (feat. Tamika)	Single	EMFA Music
2022	"Forget the Real World" (with Remzcore)	Single	Remz Roster
2022	"Don't Care" (feat. IC3MANIA & Kayliana)	Single	EMFA Music
2023	"Make Me Wanna" (with Alaguan, feat. Mixie Moon)	Single	EMFA Music
2023	"Through the Night" (with Tatsunoshin)	Single	EMFA Music
2023	"Virtual Rave"	Single	EMFA Music
2023	"Feel That Way" (with No Hero, feat. Ella)	Single	EMFA Music
2023	"Ufo" (with Little Sis Nora)	Single	House of Albatraoz
2023	"Come Inside" (with GPF & DJ Gollum)	Single	Greazy Recordz
2023	"One More" (feat. Hannah Fortune & lowstattic)	Single	EMFA Music
2023	"Teledildonics" (feat. Virgen Maria)	Single	EMFA Music
2023	"This Beat Has Got Me"	Single	EMFA Music
2023	"Elevate" (with Little Sis Nora)	Single	EMFA Music
2023	"Alien" (feat. Kayliana)	Single	Basscon Records
2023	"Rave All Night" (feat. Tamika)	Single	EMFA Music
2024	"Redlining" (with Weaver)	Single	EMFA Music
2024	"Back To You" (with Walras, feat. Regina)	Single	EMFA Music
2024	"Pika Girl 2024" (with GPF)	Single	EMFA Music
2024	"The Few & The Many"	Single	EMFA Music
2024	"Harder & Faster" (feat. ElectroDolly)	Single	EMFA Music
2024	"LoveBOMB" (feat. Nikki Simmons)	Single	EMFA Music
2024	"Touch the Sky"	Single	EMFA Music
2024	"Super Hot" (with LVL1, feat. IC3MANIA)	Single	EMFA Music
2024	"The Genre Police" (with Little Sis Nora & AronChupa)	Single	House of Albatraoz
2024	"Sale On Now!"	Single	EMFA Music
2024	"Rave Angel" (feat. Ella)	Single	EMFA Music
2024	"Never Leave Me" (with Crystal Rock & Tatsunoshin)	Single	Rave Culture Music B.V.
2024	"Play It Loud" (with Remzcore)	Single	Remz Roster
2025	"In My Bones"	Single	EMFA Music
2025	"Dumb" (with Nanobii)	Single	EMFA Music
2025	"What We Do (HTID Mix)"	Single	EMFA Music
2025	"Hunger for Your Heart" (feat. IgikoPop & IC3MANIA)	Single	EMFA Music
2025	"Rush" (with Technikore, feat. Ella)	Single	EMFA Music
2025	"Unicorn" (feat. SONJA)	Single	EMFA Music
2025	"Together" (with Fatshaudi & Luca Rain)	Single	EMFA Music
2025	"Let the Music Take Control" (feat. SONJA)	Single	EMFA Music
2025	"Stopping for Nothing" (with Slen-D)	Single	EMFA Music
2025	"That Night" (with Alaguan & Brisk, feat. Kayliana)	Single	EMFA Music
2025	"Tridactyl"	Single	EMFA Music
2025	"Boy Slut" (with Pinkii)	Single	EMFA Music
2025	"And We Go" (feat. CODA & IC3MANIA)	Single	EMFA Music
2026	"AI Slop" (with Remzcore)	Single	Remz Roster
2026	"TRILLIUM HARDTEKK" (with Bearn)	EP	VBR / Black 17 Media
2026	"Negative XP"	Single	EMFA Music
2026	"TRILLIUM FUNK" (with Sayfalse)	Single	Sketch Music LLC
2026	"Pretty Little Kitty (Neko Nation 2wu)" (with Pinkii)	Single	EMFA Music
2026	"OMG! He's a DJ"	Single	EMFA Music
2026	"Pixel Affection (Cyber Angel)" (with Epic Schmetterling & Sylinda)	Single	EMFA Music
2026	"Internet Baby" (with BEANIE)	Single	EMFA Music
2026	"Extra Life" (with Weaver, feat. Lexi)	Single	EMFA Music
2026	"Drop That Acid" (with Kevin Energy)	Single	EMFA Music
2026	"Heaven is a Rave" (feat. Jodie)	Single	EMFA Music
2026	"Nyan Cat Theme" (with Tatsunoshin, Sarah Bonito & dv5k)	Single	Dancing Dead
2026	"Transformers (VVVIP)"	VVVIP S3RL Upgraded	EMFA Music
2026	"Move With You (VVVIP)"	VVVIP S3RL Upgraded	EMFA Music
2026	"Doof Doof Untz Untz (VVVIP)"	VVVIP S3RL Upgraded	EMFA Music

=== Compilations ===
Year	Title	Details	Label
2007	Old Skool Masters	12 tracks	Relentless Digital
2016	Remastered	24 remastered tracks	Executive Records

=== Remixes ===
Year	Artist	Title	Label
2006	Cascada	"Everytime We Touch (S3RL Hard Mix)"	
2006	EMF-7	"Raver Raver Raver (S3RL Remix)"	Relentless Vinyl
2007	Cascada	"Bad Boy (S3RL Remix)"	Relentless Digital
2007	Perfect Phase	"Slammer Jammer (S3RL Remix)"	Relentless Digital
2007	Smile.dk	"Butterfly (S3RL Remix)"	Relentless Digital
2007	Alice Deejay	"Back in My Life (S3RL Remix)"	Relentless Digital
2007	Top Cat 4 & Nex Level	"Save You (S3RL Remix)"	Executive Digital
2008	The Medic Droid	"Fer Sure (S3RL Remix)"	EMFA Music
2008	Rampant	"Rhythm of the Night (S3RL Remix)"	Liquid Hardcore
2009	Starstruck & Lumin8 feat. JessKah	"Fantasy Land (S3RL Remix)"	Australia With Force
2009	Karaoke Pirates	"Baby Baby (S3RL Remix)"	Relentless Digital
2009	Haze & Dundlee feat. Rowena	"Dream Surprise (S3RL Remix)"	Recycled Digital
2009	Smartyz	"Close My Eyes (S3RL Remix)"	Kanibalz Digitalz
2009	Audien & Naggy	"Climax (S3RL Remix)"	Australia With Force
2010	Oceania	"Over the Moon (S3RL Remix)"	Australia With Force
2010	Matt Luminate feat. MC Whiskey	"Emcees and Deejays (S3RL Remix)"	Fundamental Hardcore
2011	Douglas	"FM-200 (S3RL Remix)"	Nu Energy Records
2012	Xamidium	"I Don't Wanna Grow Up (S3RL Remix)"	EMFA Music
2012	Breeze & Styles	"You're Shining (S3RL Bootleg Remix)"	bassdrop.ca
2012	X-FIR3 & Jaz EK	"Safe Sex (S3RL Remix)"	Relentless Digital
2013	Brisk	"Airhead (S3RL Remix)"	Kniteforce Again
2014	Project Shadow	"Calls to Heaven (S3RL Remix)"	Justice Hardcore
2014	Project Shadow feat. Racy	"The Fix (S3RL Remix)"	Justice Hardcore
2015	Stephanie Brite	"Circus Sound (S3RL Remix)"	Stephanie Brite
2015	Noc.V	"Neko Nation Anthem (S3RL Remix)"	Noc.V
2016	Special D & Scott Brown	"Elysium (S3RL Remix)"	
2019	Napalm Death	"You Suffer (S3RL Remix)"	
2019	Outforce, Hartshorn & MC Riddle	"Keep It Mello (S3RL Remix)"	Justice Hardcore
2019	Disko Warp feat. Fright Ranger	"Oh Oh Oh Sexy Vampire (S3RL vs JUSTiNB Remix)"	Disko Warp
2020	DJ Sammy	"Heaven (S3RL feat. Tamika Remix)"	EMFA Free
2021	Little Sis Nora	"MDMA (S3RL Remix)"	Universal Music AB
2021	Little Sis Nora	"Rave in My Garage (S3RL Remix Radio Edit)"	Universal Music AB
2021	Dorian Electra feat. Kero Kero Bonito	"M'Lady (S3RL Remix)"	Dorian Electra
2022	Whigfield	"Sexy Eyes (S3RL Remix)"	Central Station Records
2024	DJ Satomi	"Castle in the Sky (S3RL Remix)"	
2024	Al Storm	"Surrender - S3RL Radio Edit"	24/7
2024	RomancePlanet	"DANCE (S3RL Remix)"	broke
2025	Adam Sandler	"At a Medium Pace (S3RL Remix)"	
2026	Kittyfish	"STRAMILK (S3RL Remix)"	kittyfish records

=== DJ mixes ===
Release date	Title	Label
12 May 2007	S3RL Presents	EMFA Free
2 May 2008	S3RL Now Presents	EMFA Free
10 June 2009	S3RL Also Presents	EMFA Free
15 January 2010	S3RL Still Presents	EMFA Free
21 April 2010	S3RL Continues to Present	EMFA Free
21 December 2010	S3RL Won't Stop Presenting	EMFA Free
2 August 2011	S3RL Keeps on Presenting	EMFA Free
5 July 2012	S3RL F#@%!$ Presents	EMFA Free
12 April 2013	S3RL Repeatedly Presents	EMFA Free
25 May 2014	S3RL Chooses to Present	EMFA Free
22 July 2015	S3RL Presently Presents	EMFA Free
18 May 2016	S3RL Russe Mix	EMFA Free
23 September 2016	10 Years of S3RL	EMFA Free
6 April 2017	S3RL Currently Presents	EMFA Free
6 December 2018	S3RL Always Presents	EMFA Free
19 December 2024	S3RL Ultimately Presents	EMFA Free
