= Daddy DJ (song) =

Song by Daddy DJ

Single by Daddy DJ

from the album Let Your Body Talk
- Released: November 1999
- Length: 3:36
- Label: Sony Music, RKG
- Songwriters: David Le Roy, Jean Christophe Belval
- Producers: J&B

Daddy DJ singles chronology
"Daddy DJ" (1999)	"The Girl in Red" (2001)

"Daddy DJ" is a song recorded by the French dance act of the same name. It was their debut single from their first album Let Your Body Talk and was first released in many European countries between April and December 2000. The music video was produced as an animated feature.

== Chart performance ==
"Daddy DJ" was a top-ten hit in France, Finland, Denmark, Germany, Spain, the Netherlands and Flanders (Belgium) and topped the singles charts in Sweden, Norway and Wallonia (Belgium). In France, "Daddy DJ" peaked at number two for 10 nonconsecutive weeks on the SNEP Singles Chart, being unable to dislodge "Seul" by Garou and "It Wasn't Me" by Shaggy from the number-one spot. As of August 2014, the song was the 24th best-selling single of the 21st century in France, with 525,000 units sold.

== Music video ==
The animated music video for the song was produced by Aladin Net Prod and was released in France in 1999 and in 2000 elsewhere. The music video illustrates the song's lyrics.

=== Synopsis ===
The video starts out with the act's main protagonist Kross, a 16 year old boy who is an aspiring DJ, watching his father practice for performing at a club. After his father refuses to play a Daddy DJ record he likes, Kross is frustrated later that night when his dad leaves for the club. The next day, his father is really tired but in the evening performs back at the club again. Kross uses his computer webcam to transport himself into the club, while simultaneously his father is teleported into his son's room. Everyone enjoys Kross's skills and an agent signs Kross with a record deal. He becomes famous and at the end of the video he is seen talking on the phone with an unknown person in an office in a large building labeled "Daddy DJ's Records".

== Track listings ==
CD single

1. "Daddy DJ" (Chico and Tonio radio edit) — 3:36
2. "Daddy DJ" (original extended mix) — 5:46

CD maxi

1. "Daddy DJ" (Chico and Tonio radio edit) — 3:38
2. "Daddy DJ" (original radio edit) — 3:44
3. "Daddy DJ" (G-box 2 steps lullaby mix) — 3:41

== Charts ==
=== Weekly charts ===
Weekly chart performance for "Daddy DJ"
Chart (2000–01)	Peak position
Australia (ARIA Charts)	67
Austria (Ö3 Austria Top 40)	7
Belgium (Ultratop 50 Flanders)	8
Belgium (Ultratop 50 Wallonia)	1
Denmark (Tracklisten)	2
Europe (Eurochart Hot 100)	14
Finland (Suomen virallinen lista)	3
France (SNEP)	2
Germany (GfK)	7
Netherlands (Dutch Top 40)	15
Netherlands (Single Top 100)	7
Norway (VG-lista)	1
Romania (Romanian Top 100)	11
Spain (Promusicae)	9
Sweden (Sverigetopplistan)	1
Switzerland (Schweizer Hitparade)	22
UK Singles (The Official Charts Company)	198

=== Year-end charts ===
2000 year-end chart performance for "Daddy DJ"
Chart (2000)	Position
France (SNEP)	94

2001 year-end chart performance for "Daddy DJ"
Chart (2001)	Position
Austria (Ö3 Austria Top 40)	56
Belgium (Ultratop 50 Flanders)	48
Belgium (Ultratop 50 Wallonia)	1
Europe (Eurochart Hot 100)	6
France (SNEP)	4
Germany (Media Control)	35
Netherlands (Dutch Top 40)	66
Netherlands (Single Top 100)	36
Sweden (Hitlistan)	1

== Certifications and sales ==
Certifications for "Daddy DJ"
Region	Certification	Certified units/sales
Belgium (BRMA)	2× Platinum	100,000^{*}
Denmark (IFPI Danmark)	Platinum	8,000^{^}
France (SNEP)	Diamond	750,000^{*}
Norway (IFPI Norway)	Platinum	
Sweden (GLF)	2× Platinum	60,000^{^}
^{*} Sales figures based on certification alone.^{^} Shipments figures based on certification alone.

== Cover versions ==
Since its release, "Daddy DJ" and its widely popular tune have been sampled and covered by numerous other artists.

- In September to October 2006, the song was sampled by Swedish singer Basshunter in his hit "Vi sitter i Ventrilo och spelar DotA" (also known as simply "DotA").
- In November 2007, German Eurodance character and virtual musician Gummibär covered the song for his debut album I Am Your Gummy Bear, but with a changed name "Funny DJ".
- On 8th January 2008, a YouTube creator named "Kamil" made a cover called "Po twojej pysznej zupie"
- In 2008, Basshunter once again sampled the song, this time into his hit "All I Ever Wanted".
- In December 2008, the song's melody was sampled by Australian DJ S3RL on the song "Pretty Rave Girl".
- In 2009, "Daddy DJ" was covered by Swedish character Crazy Frog and released as a single off its third album Everybody Dance Now. It entered the French Singles Chart at a peak of number four, and totaled 15 weeks in the top 50. The song debuted at number 14 on the Eurochart Hot 100 Singles, dropping 18 places to number 32 the following week. It ranked at number 46 on the French year-end chart.
- In 2021, the melody was sampled by artist Maddix for the song "Superheroes".
- In January 2022, Italian rapper and neomelodic artist Niko Pandetta sampled the melody for his song "Bella Vita".
- In June 2022, Italian DJ Gabry Ponte and Austrian DJ Lum!x sampled the song in their song "We Could Be Together".
- In April 2024, Gummibär remixed his cover "Funny DJ" after seventeen years of its original release.
- In September 2024, Clover! released a cover named "Pretty Scene Girl!"
- In April 2025, HVDES and gladde paling released a cover also named "Pretty Rave Girl".
