= I'm a Gummy Bear =

"I'm a Gummy Bear (The Gummy Bear Song)"

Single by Gummibär

from the album I Am Your Gummy Bear
- Released: November 6, 2007
- Genre: Pop, novelty
- Length: 2:30 (music video version); 3:10 (album version)
- Label: Gummybear International
- Songwriter: Christian P. Schneider
- Producers: Tonekind, Papabär, René Rennefeld

Gummibär singles chronology
"I'm a Gummy Bear (The Gummy Bear Song)" (2007)	"Cho Ka Ka O (Choco Choco Choco)" (2008)

Music video
- "The Gummy Bear Song" on YouTube

Audio sample
- file; help

"I'm a Gummy Bear (The Gummy Bear Song)" (also known as "I Am a Gummy Bear") is a novelty dance song by German virtual musician Gummibär, in reference to the gummy bear, a type of bear-shaped candy originating in Germany. It was written by German composer Christian Schneider and released by Gummibär's label Gummybear International. The song was first released in Hungary, where it spent eight months as number one atop the ringtones chart.

Subsequently, it became a global phenomenon as an Internet meme, in large part due to its corresponding videos on YouTube and Myspace. It has since been released in at least 43 languages, and the English version alone has spread virally worldwide, with more than 4 billion plays on YouTube.

The French version ("Je m'appelle Funny Bear") was written by Peter Kitsch. The French music video has over 541 million views on YouTube as of 28 September 2026, making it one of the top-10 most-viewed French videos on the site. It peaked at number eight on the French singles chart.

With the song ready-made for ringtone use, critic John Sekerka commented "he's the ultimate cross-platform, cross-cultural phenomenon YouTube was designed to unleash." It is heard on his debut album I Am Your Gummy Bear released in 2007. Since the song's release, many songs, including a cover of "Blue (Da Ba Dee)", have been released by Gummibär.

== Background ==
Christian Schneider wrote "I'm a Gummy Bear (The Gummy Bear Song)" after he found his muse for the single working in the bar while he was enjoying his beer in Germany. She initially told him he was her "gummy bear". His first reaction was "No, what?", however, in the very next moment, he playfully retorted "I'm your gummy bear". The interaction inspired Christian to come up with a melody, which prompted him to record it on his Walkman.

== Multiple languages ==
Several versions have been released in many languages. The song was originally released in German and English, and, as mentioned, the French version has received more than half a billion views. Gummibär released a whole album of their new languages on YouTube.

Other languages include Japanese, Korean, Dutch, Portuguese, Hungarian, Swedish, Slovak, Swahili, Polish, Turkish, Klingon, and several more.

== Music video ==
Videos corresponding to at least 43 languages are currently uploaded featuring the titular gummy bear character in orange underwear bouncing and breakdancing.

Gummibär is a blue-eyed, highly stylized, green gummy bear. He is slightly overweight and wears orange Y-front briefs and white sneakers. He also seems to have a half-chewed right ear. His muzzle, or mustache and goatee, are sugar-crusted and with only two small teeth spaced far apart on his lower jaw.

In 2006, the video, a 30-second CGI pop promo animated in Softimage XSI, was directed, designed and animated by Pete Dodd and was produced through Wilfilm in Copenhagen for Ministry of Sound GmbH in Berlin.

The English music video, posted on October 9, 2007, has over 4 billion views on YouTube as of September 2026, making it one of the top-30 most-viewed videos on the site.

== Charts ==
=== Weekly charts ===
Weekly chart performance
Chart (2007)	Peak position
Australia (ARIA)	12
France (SNEP)	8
Sweden (Sverigetopplistan)	11

Chart (2009)	Peak position
Germany (GfK)	53
Greece Digital Songs (Billboard)	1
Japan Hot 100 (Billboard)	36
Canada Hot 100 (Billboard)	87
US Hot Dance/Electronic Songs (Billboard)	28

=== Year-end charts ===
Year-end chart performance
Chart (2007)	Position
Australia (ARIA)	95
Sweden (Sverigetopplistan)	72

== Certifications ==
Certifications
Region	Certification	Certified units/sales
Canada (Music Canada)	Gold	20,000^{*}
New Zealand (RMNZ)	Gold	15,000^{‡}
Norway (IFPI Norway)	Gold	5,000^{*}
Sweden (GLF)	Platinum	20,000^{^}
United Kingdom (BPI)	Silver	200,000^{‡}
United States (RIAA)	2× Platinum	2,000,000^{‡}
^{*} Sales figures based on certification alone.^{^} Shipments figures based on certification alone.^{‡} Sales+streaming figures based on certification alone.

== See also ==
- Axel F
- Blue (Da Ba Dee)
- Cho Ka Ka O
- Gummibär
