= Gummibär =

German character and virtual musician

Background information
- Also known as: Gummy Bear
- Origin: Germany
- Genres: Dance; house; novelty; Eurodance; pop; bubblegum
- Years active: 2006–present
- Label: Gummybear International
- Website: thegummybear.com

Logo
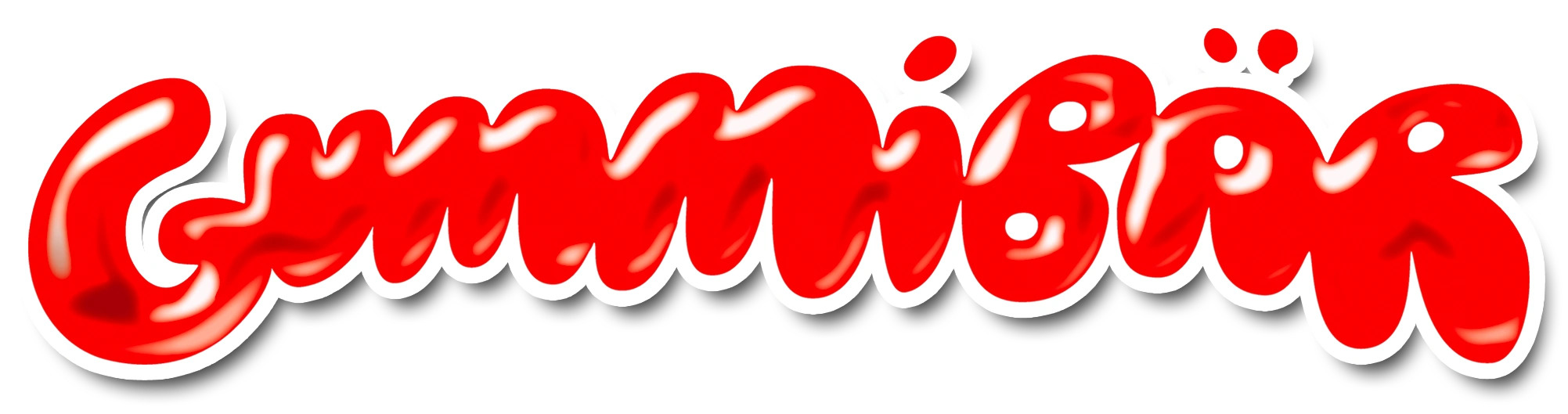

Gummibär (pronounced [ˈɡʊmibɛːɐ̯]; German for "gummy bear") or Gummy Bear is a German Eurodance multilingual character and virtual musician that performs gummy bear-related songs on various albums, including I Am Your Gummy Bear (2007) and La La Love To Dance (2010). The video for the song "I Am a Gummy Bear" and its Spanish version "Osito Gominola" have 4 billion and 1.4 billion views on YouTube, respectively.

== Name origins and appearance ==
The name "Gummibär" originates from a German brand of bear-shaped gummy candies from Haribo introduced in 1920. The highly-stylized, green-coloured, blue-eyed gelatinous bear character wears orange Y-front briefs and white sneakers.

== Popularity ==
Gummibär's popularity as a phenomenon is similar to that of fellow European animated musician Crazy Frog, characterized by the repetition of lyrics and catchy melodies. Variants of the character's music have been released in various languages internationally.

In 2006, Gummibär began to be marketed in Germany and Hungary by the German mobile entertainment company Jamba! through ringtone and mobile content promotions.

== Video ==
The video, a 30-second CGI pop promo animated in Softimage XSI, was directed, designed and animated by Pete Dodd and produced through Wilfilm in Copenhagen for Ministry of Sound GmbH in Berlin. The original video was a 30-second version of the Hungarian version, "Itt Van A Gumimaci", which was posted on the website Mojoflix.com.

== DVD ==
Gummibär: I Am A Gummy Bear - The Gummibär Video Collection was released on April 28, 2009, in the US. The DVD contains a video collection of "I Am a Gummy Bear" in nine different languages, as well as some of the character's other releases. They have promoted their albums and merchandise at the start of their music videos.

== Other media ==
=== Films ===
==== Gummibär: The Yummy Gummy Search for Santa ====
Gummibär: The Yummy Gummy Search for Santa was released in the United Kingdom on 8 October 2012, and in the US on 6 November 2012, from Lionsgate Home Entertainment. It is Gummibär's first feature-length film. It was directed by Bernie Denk and Jurgen Korduletsch, and written by Robert David Stevenson and Leo St. Pierre. It stars Gummibär (Sonja Ball), Harry (Bruce Dinsmore), a male chameleon, Vampiro (Rick Jones), a male Dracula-esque vampire bat, and Kala (Holly Gauthier-Frankel), a female cat, as they embark on a search for Santa Claus, who is reported missing on Christmas Eve, and is revealed to be kidnapped by a dance-crazed alien. The film aired in the US on 1 December 2012, on The CW's Vortexx Saturday morning cartoon block, which promoted the airing as a "world premiere" despite being released the previous month.

==== Gummibär & Friends: Operation Cotton Candy ====
Gummibär & Friends: Operation Cotton Candy is scheduled to be theatrically released in 2027, by Toonz Media Group, Gummybear International, Telegael, and Space Age Films. Directed by Pete Dodd, written by Dan Berlinka, and produced by P. Jayakumar and Paul Cummins, the film marks the second feature-length film featuring the Gummibär character.

=== Web series ===
In 2016, a YouTube animated web series titled Gummibär & Friends: The Gummy Bear Show was released online on the official Gummibär YouTube channel, and consists of two seasons of 39 episodes each. International versions of the show were released on a channel titled "Gummy Bear Show International" beginning on 1 April 2020.

=== Chinese series ===
In 2025, a Chinese animated TV series titled Panda and Gummy Bear was released on the CCTV 14 Children's Channel, and consists of four seasons of 13 episodes each. The series later premiered online globally on November 14, 2026 on the official Gummibär YouTube channel.

== Discography ==
- I Am Your Gummy Bear (2007)
- La La Love To Dance (2010)
- Christmas Jollies (2010)
- Party Pop (2015)
- The Gummy Bear Album (2019)
- Gummy Bear Album 2020 (2020)
- Holiday Fun Time (2021)

== See also ==
- Crazy Frog
- Holly Dolly
- Mickael Turtle
- Schnappi
- Schnuffel
- René la Taupe
