= Daddy DJ =

French dance act

- Origin: Paris, France
- Genres: Trance, Vocal Trance, Eurodance, House
- Years active: 1999–2002, 2008–present
- Labels: RKG Records, Sony Music
- Members: David Le Roy; Jean-Christophe Belval; Charly Merkiled (1999-2002; 2024—present); Pierre-Alexandre Favriel (2022—present)

Daddy DJ is a French dance act consisting of David Le Roy, Jean-Christophe Belval, and Charly Merkiled.

== Musical career ==
David Le Roy and Jean-Christophe Belval first met at the French sound engineering school in Paris, where Belval was a teacher while Le Roy was a student. They got along very well, so much so that they soon founded their own music project, titled Daddy DJ. They were soon joined by Charly Merkiled, who originates from Martinique.

Their debut self-titled single "Daddy DJ", released in April 2000, became a hit across Europe. It reached 2nd position in the French top 100 for almost 5 months. In Germany the song reached 7th place, while in Switzerland the song reached 22nd place in the charts, in addition to the singles The Girl In Red (41) and Over You (96). In Austria, it reached 8th position. The song was also very successful in Northern Europe, topping the charts in Sweden and Norway and peaking at #2 in Denmark and at #3 in Finland. Their later singles "The Girl in Red" and "Over You" proved less popular though, and they remained a one-hit wonder in most countries. In 2012, they recorded a new album called Folder, which also failed to find commercial success.

=== Character ===
Many of Daddy DJ's music videos feature a 13-year-old boy known as Daddy Boy (officially by Pierre-Alex Favriel), who is also known as Kross in the fanbase. He is depicted in the music videos as a child DJ prodigy who is more adept at DJing than his father.

During the release of their single “Issues” featuring LUNIS, Favriel confirmed in an interview that Daddy Boy ages in real time, also went on with saying that Daddy Boy would be in his 30s in 2023.

== Discography ==
=== Studio Albums ===
- 2001: Let Your Body Talk
- 2012: Folder
- 2025: Back to the Party (25 Years of Daddy DJ)

=== Singles ===
| Title | Year | Chart positions | | | | | | | | | | Certifications | Album |
| Title | Year | AUT | BEL (WA) | DEN | FIN | FRA | GER | NLD | NOR | SWE | SWI | Certifications | Album |
|---|---|---|---|---|---|---|---|---|---|---|---|---|---|
| "Daddy DJ" | 1999 | 8 | 1 | 2 | 3 | 2 | 7 | 7 | 1 | 1 | 22 | BEL: 2× Platinum; DEN: Platinum; FRA: Diamond; NOR: Platinum; SWE: 2× Platinum | Let Your Body Talk |
| "The Girl in Red" | 2001 | — | 10 | 9 | 12 | 10 | — | — | 17 | 18 | 41 | FRA: Gold | Let Your Body Talk |
| "Over You" | 2002 | 49 | 33 | — | — | 29 | 79 | 60 | — | 43 | 96 | | Let Your Body Talk |
| "Free Your Mind" | 2014 | — | — | — | — | — | — | — | — | — | — | | Folder |
| "We Could Be Together" (with Gabry Ponte and Lum!x) | 2022 | — | — | — | — | 96 | — | 34 | — | — | — | | Non-album single |
"—" denotes a title that did not chart, or was not released in that territory.
