= List of number-one singles of 2005 (Spain) =

This is a list of the number-one singles on the PROMUSICAE Top 20 Physical Singles chart in 2005.

Issue date	Song	Artist(s)	Reference
January 9	"Todo nos parece una mierda"	Astrud	
January 16	"Vertigo"	U2	
January 23	"Galvanize"	The Chemical Brothers	
January 30	"Galvanize"	The Chemical Brothers	
February 6	"Nunca volverá"	El sueño de Morfeo	
February 13	"Nunca volverá"	El sueño de Morfeo	
February 20	"Sometimes You Can't Make It on Your Own"	U2	
February 27	"Nunca volverá"	El sueño de morfeo	
March 3	"El universo sobre mí"	Amaral	
March 13	"El universo sobre mí"	Amaral	
March 20	"El universo sobre mí"	Amaral	
March 27	"Nunca volverá"	El sueño de morfeo	
April 3	"Canto (El mismo dolor)"	Bunbury	
April 10	"The Trawlerman's Song" (EP)	Mark Knopfler	
April 17	"The Trawlerman's Song" (EP)	Mark Knopfler	
April 24	"Enamorada de ti"	Mónica Naranjo	
May 1	"Enamorada de ti"	Mónica Naranjo	
May 8	"Renuncia al sol"	Skizoo	
May 15	"Feel Good Inc."	Gorillaz	
May 22	"La tortura"	Shakira con Alejandro Sanz	
May 29	"La tortura"	Shakira con Alejandro Sanz	
June 5	"La tortura"	Shakira con Alejandro Sanz	
June 12	"La tortura"	Shakira con Alejandro Sanz	
June 19	"City of Blinding Lights"	U2	
June 26	"City of Blinding Lights"	U2	
July 3	"Himno oficial del centenario del Sevilla"	El Arrebato	
July 10	"Axel F"	Crazy Frog	
July 17	"Axel F"	Crazy Frog	
July 24	"Axel F"	Crazy Frog	
July 31	"Axel F"	Crazy Frog	
August 7	"Himno oficial del centenario del Sevilla"	El Arrebato	
August 14	"Himno oficial del centenario del Sevilla"	El Arrebato	
August 21	"Ooh la la"	Goldfrapp	
August 28	"Streets of Love"	The Rolling Stones	
September 4	"The Trooper"	Iron Maiden	
September 11	"The Trooper"	Iron Maiden	
September 18	"Sin rencor"	OBK	
September 25	"Sin rencor"	OBK	
October 2	"Popcorn"	Crazy Frog	
October 9	"Precious"	Depeche Mode	
October 16	"Precious"	Depeche Mode	
October 23	"Precious"	Depeche Mode	
October 30	"Dos mentiras"	Circus	
November 6	"La posada de los muertos"	Mago de Oz	
November 13	"Hung Up"	Madonna	
November 20	"Hung Up"	Madonna	
November 27	"Hung Up"	Madonna	
December 4	"Hung Up"	Madonna	
December 11	"Hung Up"	Madonna	
December 18	"A pain that I'm used to"	Depeche Mode	
December 25	"Jingle Bells/Last Christmas"	Crazy Frog	

== See also ==
- 2005 in music
- List of number-one hits in Spain
