= List of Ultratop 40 number-one singles of 2005 =

This is a list of songs that topped the Belgian Walloon (francophone) Ultratop 40 in 2005.

Issue Date	Artist	Song
January 1	Garou & Michel Sardou	La Rivière de notre enfance
January 8	Garou & Michel Sardou	La Rivière de notre enfance
January 15	Garou & Michel Sardou	La Rivière de notre enfance
January 22	Starsailor	Four to the Floor
January 29	Starsailor	Four to the Floor
February 5	Starsailor	Four to the Floor
February 12	Starsailor	Four to the Floor
February 19	Solidarité Asie Tsunami 12-12	Ensemble
February 26	Solidarité Asie Tsunami 12-12	Ensemble
March 5	Green Day	Boulevard of Broken Dreams
March 12	Amel Bent	Ma Philosophie
March 19	Amel Bent	Ma Philosophie
March 26	Amel Bent	Ma Philosophie
April 2	Amel Bent	Ma Philosophie
April 9	Amel Bent	Ma Philosophie
April 16	Amel Bent	Ma Philosophie
April 23	Ilona Mitrecey	Un Monde parfait
April 30	Ilona Mitrecey	Un Monde Parfait
May 7	Ilona Mitrecey	Un Monde Parfait
May 14	Ilona Mitrecey	Un Monde Parfait
May 21	Ilona Mitrecey	Un Monde Parfait
May 28	Ilona Mitrecey	Un Monde Parfait
June 4	Ilona Mitrecey	Un Monde Parfait
June 11	Ilona Mitrecey	Un Monde Parfait
June 18	Ilona Mitrecey	Un Monde Parfait
June 25	Ilona Mitrecey	Un Monde Parfait
July 2	Ilona Mitrecey	Un Monde Parfait
July 9	Ilona Mitrecey	Un Monde Parfait
July 16	Crazy Frog	Axel F
July 23	Crazy Frog	Axel F
July 30	Crazy Frog	Axel F
August 6	Crazy Frog	Axel F
August 13	Crazy Frog	Axel F
August 20	Crazy Frog	Axel F
August 27	Crazy Frog	Axel F
September 3	Crazy Frog	Axel F
September 10	Crazy Frog	Axel F
September 17	Crazy Frog	Axel F
September 24	Crazy Frog	Axel F
October 1	Crazy Frog	Axel F
October 8	Crazy Frog	Axel F
October 15	Star Academy 5	Je Ne Suis Pas Un Héros
October 22	Crazy Frog	Popcorn
October 29	Crazy Frog	Popcorn
November 5	Lââm	Petite sœur
November 12	Lââm	Petite sœur
November 19	Madonna	Hung Up
November 26	Madonna	Hung Up
December 3	Madonna	Hung Up
December 10	Madonna	Hung Up
December 17	Madonna	Hung Up
December 24	Madonna	Hung Up
December 31	Madonna	Hung Up

== Best-Selling Singles ==
This is the ten best-selling/performing singles in 2005.

Pos.	Artist	Title	HP	Weeks
1	Crazy Frog	"Axel F"	1	31
2	Ilona Mitrecey	"Un Monde Parfait"	1	32
3	Amel Bent	"Ma Philosophie"	1	24
4	Sinsemilia	"Tout le Bonheur du Monde"	2	28
5	Akon	"Lonely"	2	21
6	Pinocchio	"T'es Pas Cap Pinocchio"	2	21
7	Madonna	"Hung Up"	1	7
8	Raphaël	"Caravane"	2	27
9	Lââm	"Petite Sœur"	1	15
10	Shakira featuring Alejandro Sanz	"La Tortura"	5	23

== See also ==
- 2005 in music
