= Hung Up =

2005 single by Madonna

Single by Madonna

from the album Confessions on a Dance Floor
- Released: October 17, 2005
- Recorded: 2005
- Studio: Stuart Price's home (London, England)
- Genre: Dance-pop; disco; nu-disco; electro; hi-NRG
- Length: 5:37 (album version); 3:23 (radio version/edit)
- Label: Warner Bros.
- Songwriters: Madonna; Stuart Price; Benny Andersson; Björn Ulvaeus
- Producers: Madonna; Stuart Price

Madonna singles chronology
"Love Profusion" (2003)	"Hung Up" (2005)	"Sorry" (2006)

Music video
- "Hung Up" on YouTube

"Hung Up" is a song by American singer Madonna from her tenth studio album Confessions on a Dance Floor (2005). Initially used in a number of television advertisements and serials, the song was released as the album's lead single on October 17, 2005. Written and produced by Madonna in collaboration with Stuart Price, "Hung Up" prominently features a sample from an instrumental section of ABBA's "Gimme! Gimme! Gimme! (A Man After Midnight)", for which Madonna personally sought permission from its songwriters, Benny Andersson and Björn Ulvaeus. This is one of the few times Andersson and Ulvaeus have given permission to sample one of their songs, following "Rumble in the Jungle" by the Fugees and "Fly with Me" by 98 Degrees.

Musically, the song is influenced by pop music from the 1980s, with a chugging groove and chorus and a background element of a ticking clock that suggests the fear of wasting time. Lyrically, the song is written as a traditional dance number about a strong, independent woman who has relationship troubles. "Hung Up" received critical praise from reviewers, who considered it among Madonna's best dance tracks and believed that the track would restore her popularity, which had diminished following the release of her 2003 album American Life. "Hung Up" became a global commercial success, peaking atop the charts of 41 countries and earning a place in the Guinness Book of World Records. It was Madonna's 36th top ten single on the Billboard Hot 100, tying her with Elvis Presley as the artist with most top ten entries. It also became the most successful dance song of the decade in the United States. "Hung Up" has sold over five million copies worldwide.

The music video is a tribute to John Travolta and his movies, and to dancing in general. Directed by Johan Renck, the clip starts with Madonna clad in a pink leotard dancing alone in a ballet studio and concludes at a gaming parlor where she dances with her backup troupe. Interspersed are scenes of people displaying their dancing skills in a variety of settings, including a Los Angeles residential neighborhood, a small restaurant, the London Underground and a London nightclub. Madonna has performed the song in a number of live appearances, including as the final number of 2006's Confessions Tour, and heavy metal-inspired arrangement in the 2008 leg of the Sticky & Sweet Tour. The MDNA Tour of 2012 saw the singer performing the song while slacklining, while during the Celebration Tour of 2023–2024, it was remixed with "Hung Up on Tokischa" and performed amid topless dancers.

== Background and release ==
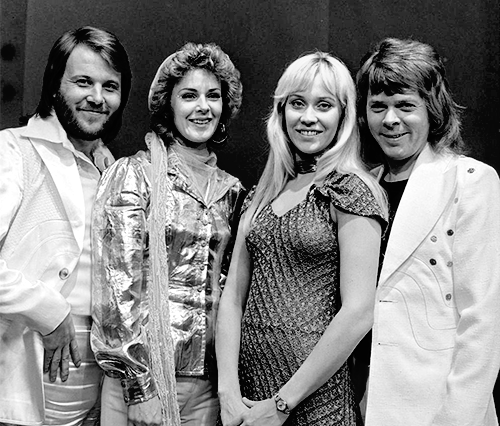
"Hung Up" was inspired by ABBA and samples their 1979 song "Gimme! Gimme! Gimme! (A Man After Midnight)".

In 2004, after the release of her ninth studio album American Life, Madonna began working on two different musicals: one tentatively called Hello Suckers and another one with Luc Besson, who previously directed the music video for her single "Love Profusion", which would portray her as a woman on her deathbed looking back on her life. Madonna collaborated with Patrick Leonard, Mirwais Ahmadzaï and Stuart Price to write new songs, and told Price to pen disco songs that sound like "ABBA on drugs". However, Madonna found herself dissatisfied with the script written by Besson and scrapped it. When she began composing Confessions on a Dance Floor, she decided to rework "Hung Up" and include it in her record.

"Hung Up" was one of the first songs written for the album, along with "Sorry" and "Future Lovers". It was inspired by aspects of the 1970s disco era, including the music of ABBA and Giorgio Moroder and the film Saturday Night Fever (1977). Madonna imagined it to be a cross between the music played at Danceteria, the New York City night club she frequented in her early days, and the music of ABBA. Their 1979 song "Gimme! Gimme! Gimme! (A Man After Midnight)" formed the basis of the song. Songwriters Benny Andersson and Björn Ulvaeus generally do not allow anyone to sample any of their tracks, an exception being Fugees, who sampled their song "The Name of the Game" for their single "Rumble in the Jungle". In order to gain the rights to sample "Gimme! Gimme! Gimme!", Madonna had to send her emissary to Stockholm with a letter which begged them to allow her to sample the song and also telling how much she loved their music. To the BBC she explained: "[T]hey never let anyone sample their music. Thank God they didn't say no. [...] They had to think about it, Benny and Björn. They didn't say yes straight away." The pair agreed to let Madonna use the sample only after making a copyright agreement that entitled them to a significant share of the royalties from subsequent sales and airplay. Andersson, in an interview with The Daily Telegraph in October 2005, declared "Gimme! Gimme! Gimme!" to be the essence of "Hung Up" while joking that it was his favorite Madonna song thus far. He further said:

"We get so many requests from people wanting to use our tracks but we normally say 'no'. This is only the second time we have given permission. We said 'yes' this time because we admire Madonna so much and always have done. She has got guts and has been around for 21 years. That is not bad going."

The song premiered in September 2005, during a television advertisement for Motorola's ROKR mobile phone. The advertisement featured Madonna and other artists jammed in a phone booth. On October 17, 2005, the song made its premiere during a live ten-minute radio interview between Ryan Seacrest and Madonna. It was also made available as a master ringtone with various mobile service providers. "Hung Up" was sent to mainstream radio in the United States on October 18. The song was added to episodes of CSI: Miami and CSI: NY on November 7 and 9, 2005, respectively. While promoting Confessions on a Dance Floor, Madonna played both "Hung Up" and the next single "Sorry" at Luke & Leroy's nightclub in Greenwich Village, where she was invited by Junior Sanchez to perform briefly as the DJ, mixing the two songs. Regarding her decision to release the song for digital download, Madonna said: "I'm a businesswoman. The music industry has changed. There's a lot of competition, and the market is glutted with new releases – and new 'thises and thats'. You must join forces with other brands and corporations. You're an idiot if you don't."

== Music structure and lyrics ==
"Hung Up"
A 30-second sample of "Hung Up" where Madonna sings the chorus of the song and the ABBA sample plays in the background.

Musically, "Hung Up" is a dance-pop, disco, nu-disco, electro and Hi-NRG song, with a fluffy, candy-coated aesthetic and tone. According to The New York Times, the song has vaguely familiar hooks, sustained overlays of the string arrangement and acoustic guitar enfolding the music to create a haze-like sound. The instant familiarity of the sampled music is changed by Stuart Price and Madonna by adding a chugging groove and a chorus which singles it out as an independent song.

Billboard described the music as frothy, nonsensical and joyous. Alexis Petridis from The Guardian, who also called the song "joyous", wrote it "could theoretically have been more camp, but only with the addition of Liza Minnelli on backing vocals and lyrics about Larry Grayson's friend Everard." The dance music sound of the song was described as a combination of pulsing and wistful, its genre variably called "full-on dance, dark, disco, fun, big" and "triumphant jazzercise". Alongside the ABBA sample, Rolling Stone said that the song also incorporates elements of Madonna's older songs like "Like a Prayer" and "Holiday" and features fleeting quotes from bands like S.O.S. and the Tom Tom Club. Thomas Inskeep of Stylus Magazine wrote it had the same modus operandi of being designed for "sweaty up-all-night dancing", but without the sleeve of "Physical Attraction" or "Burning Up".

According to the sheet music that is on Musicnotes.com, "Hung Up" is set in common time, and has a moderate dance-beat tempo of 120 beats per minute, and the key of D minor with Madonna's vocal range spanning from the low note of G_{3} to the high note of B♭_{4}. The song progresses in the following chord progressions of Dm–F–C–Dm in the verses and Dm–F–Am–Dm in the chorus, and changes to B♭–F–A–Dm for the bridge. "Hung Up" uses the sound of a ticking clock to symbolize fear of wasted time, which was incorporated by composer Stuart Price, from his remix of Gwen Stefani's 2004 single "What You Waiting For?". According to Slant Magazine, the song embodies some of Madonna's old singles, incorporating them into the song's pitched-upward vocals while presenting an archetypical key change/tonicization during the bridge.

Lyrically, "Hung Up" is a bittersweet love song written from the perspective of a girl who once had nothing. About.com compared the lyrics of "Hung Up" and another song "I Love New York" from the Confessions on a Dance Floor album, to the style of the songs in Madonna's American Life album. According to About.com, the song is written as a very traditional dance number which is rooted in relationship issues. Also present in the lyrics is Madonna's enduring embrace of strong, independent women. The song's hook, "Time goes by so slowly for those who wait," is taken from Madonna's 1989 collaboration with Prince, "Love Song", as is the line "Those who run seem to have all the fun."

== Critical reception ==
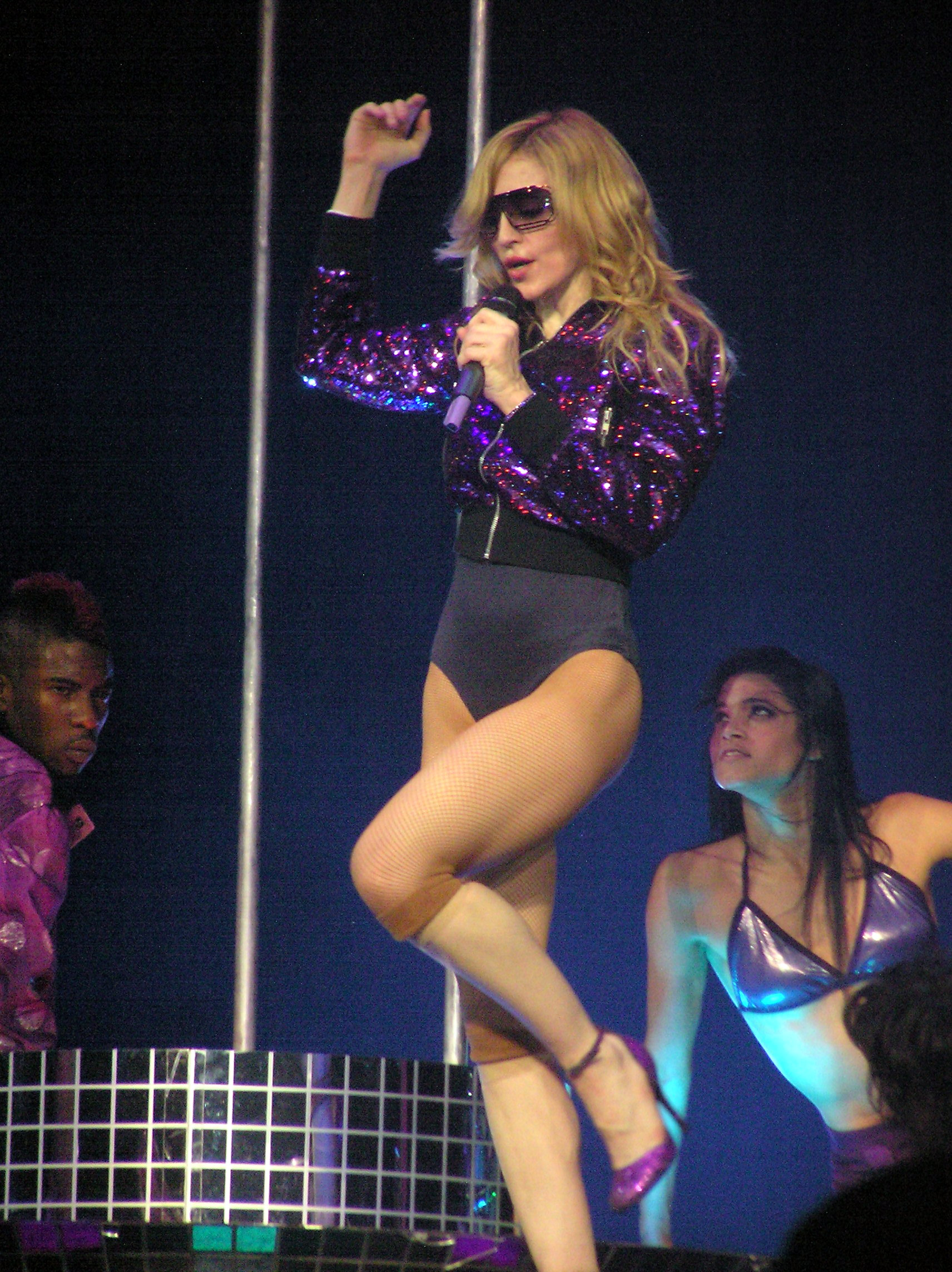
Madonna performing "Hung Up" as the final song of 2006's Confessions Tour

Upon its release, critics called "Hung Up" a "killer" and "irresistible" lead single and the artist's "most wonderfully commercial single since the mid Eighties". Chris Tucker from Billboard explained in a single review that "Madonna returns with a song that will restore faith among her minions, fans of pop music and radio programmers". Pitchfork's Stephen M. Deusner named the track an "impressive and enjoyable single, strong enough to have everyone trying to figure out if it's her best since 'Ray of Light' or since 'Like a Prayer'". Reviewing the album, David Byrne from RTÉ said "it opens the album like no other track could". According to Camille Paglia, writing for Salon, the track was one of the "two truly strong songs" on the album, along with "Jump". Praise was given towards the usage of the ABBA sample, with Deusner arguing it represents a "brilliant mash-up rather than a lazy sample".

Peter S. Scholtes of City Pages considered the song a "vast improvement" over the original ABBA song. David Browne from Entertainment Weekly argued, "'Hung Up' shows how effortlessly she [Madonna] can tap into her petulant inner teen." Tom Bishop from BBC News commented that Madonna has either reinvigorated her career or she is "merely throwing one final dance party for her long-term fans before settling down to record more sedate material". Matt Cappiello from the Daily Nexus called it "amazing" and "mind-numbing", and elaborated that "it should be frozen in a capsule and sent out into space. Martians need to know the wonders of our civilization, as expressed in the delicate form of bubblegum pop."

== Recognition ==
"Hung Up" was ranked at number 76 on Rolling Stone's 100 Best Songs of the 2000s list, calling it "One of her [Madonna's] most captivating hits ever — and thanks to those deceptively hard-hitting lyrics, one of her most personal." NME placed it at number 39 on their list of the best tracks of 2005. Slant Magazine listed the song at number 36 on their list of Best of the Aughts: Singles, saying: "'Hung Up' employs a ticking clock to represent fear of wasted time, but Madonna isn't singing about aging or saving the world—she's talking about love. It had been years since Madge sounded this vapid. With its pitched-upward vocals, infectious arpeggio sample from ABBA's 'Gimme Gimme Gimme (A Man After Midnight),' and the bridge's unironic, archetypical key change, the track decidedly points to the past, and it proved that, 20 years into her career, Madonna was still the one and only Dancing Queen". The song was also named the 26th best single of 2005 by Pitchfork. Stylus Magazine included "Hung Up" on their ranking of the best singles from 2005 at number 11. In 2016, "Hung Up" was named in the online poll by Digital Spy as "The Biggest Pop Song of the 21st Century".

== Chart performance ==
"Hung Up" was a worldwide commercial success, peaking at number one in charts of 41 countries and earning a place in the 2007 Guinness Book of World Records, as the song topping the charts in most countries. The song has sold over 5 million copies worldwide. In the United States, "Hung Up" debuted at twenty on the Billboard Hot 100 on the issue dated November 5, 2005. It became her highest opening position since "Ray of Light" entered the chart at five in 1998. The same week the song entered the Hot Digital Songs chart at number six and became the highest debuting single of the week on the Pop 100 Airplay, where it debuted at number 38. On the issue dated December 3, 2005, the song reached a peak of number seven on the Billboard Hot 100, jumping from number 14 from previous week. The song became the chart's greatest digital gainer for that week and claimed the top position on the Hot Digital Songs chart. It also tied Madonna with Elvis Presley for 36 top ten entries, which was subsequently broken by Madonna's 2008 song "4 Minutes", which peaked at number three on the Hot 100. "Hung Up" debuted at numbers 25 and 10 on the Hot Dance Club Play and Hot Dance Airplay charts respectively ultimately reaching the top of both. It became the most successful dance song of the 2000s in the United States, by topping the Dance/Club Play Songs Decade-end tally. The song also reached a peak of seven on the Pop 100 chart. In 2008, the single was certified platinum by the Recording Industry Association of America for selling at least a million copies in paid digital downloads. As of December 2016, the song has sold 1.4 million digital units in the United States.

"Hung Up" became the fastest rising single on radio in Canada, according to Nielsen Broadcast Data Systems. On the second week itself, the song reached the top of the Contemporary Hit Radio chart of Canada, while reaching the top five of the Adult Contemporary and Canadian Airplay charts. Paul Tuch from Nielsen clarified that "Hung Up" achieved this feat within 10 days only. Consequently, "Hung Up" also peaked atop the Canadian Singles Chart for 14 non-consecutive weeks, and was certified double platinum by Music Canada for sales of 40,000 copies. In Australia, the song debuted atop the ARIA Singles Chart on November 20, 2005, breaking her tie with Kylie Minogue as the female artist with most number-one singles in Australian chart history. It was present within the top 50 of the chart for 23 weeks. The song was certified platinum by the Australian Recording Industry Association (ARIA) for shipment of 70,000 copies. "Hung Up" debuted at number 67 in the French singles chart and jumped to the top next week, remaining there for five non-consecutive weeks. It received a gold certification from Syndicat National de l'Édition Phonographique (SNEP) for sales of 150,000 copies. "Hung Up" reached a peak position of number two in New Zealand.

In the United Kingdom, "Hung Up" debuted at number one on the issue dated November 13, 2005, thus giving Madonna her 11th number one single on this chart. It sold 105,619 copies becoming the first single to sell more than 100,000 copies in a week since Crazy Frog's "Axel F" did it 23 weeks earlier. The first week sales of "Hung Up" were a little lower than Madonna's last UK number one, "Music" (2000), which opened with 114,925 sales, but exceeded her last single "Love Profusion", which debuted at number 11 with 15,361 sales in December 2003. The next week the single had a decline in sales of 43% to 59,969 copies, but remained on the top as Confessions on a Dance Floor debuted atop the UK Albums Chart. It remained at the top position for three weeks and a total of 40 weeks on the Singles Chart. According to the Official Charts Company, by the end of 2005, "Hung Up" was Madonna's biggest selling single with 339,285 copies since "Music" sold 390,624 copies in 2000. It was certified Platinum by the British Phonographic Industry (BPI) and has sold over 730,000 copies in the UK to date. By November 2021, "Hung Up" became her second-most streamed track in the UK, and accumulated sales of 899,000 units including streaming figures according to the Official Charts Company. In Ireland, the song debuted at number two on the chart dated November 10, 2005 becoming the highest debut of the week. The song also topped Billboard's European Hot 100 Singles chart where it soared from 73 to the top of the chart on the issue dated November 21, 2005. The song was able to peak the charts in almost all the European nations including Austria, Belgium (Flanders and Wallonia), Denmark, Finland, Germany, Italy, Netherlands, Norway, Spain, Sweden and Switzerland. It was the second-most successful song in 2006 in Europe, behind only Shakira's "Hips Don't Lie".

== Music video ==
=== Conception ===
Madonna wearing a pink leotard while dancing in the ballet studio in the John Travolta and retro inspired "Hung Up" video

The music video for "Hung Up" was directed by Johan Renck and filmed in October 2005. Madonna's scenes were filmed in London from October 8–11, with Pineapple Dance Studios being used for the dance studio scenes and the Trocadero being used for the games arcade scenes. Though some scenes in the video feature cities like London, Paris, New York, Los Angeles, Shanghai and Tokyo, in reality the actual sets were constructed in Los Angeles and London only. A London suburb was made to look like a Parisian one, where the routine for Parkour takes place, whereas a restaurant in London's Chinatown was used for the Shanghai sequence and Compton stood in for the Bronx. Originally the video for "Hung Up" was to be directed by photographer David LaChapelle. He wanted the video to have a "documentary"-style look, much like that of his 2005 film, Rize, in which five of the dancers from the "Hung Up" video appeared. LaChapelle and Madonna disagreed on the concept, prompting the project to be reassigned to Renck, who worked with Madonna in her video for "Nothing Really Matters" (1999). According to an interview with MTV, Renck was directing Kate Moss for a H&M commercial when he received a phone call from Madonna who desperately wanted to work with him. The next day he went to Los Angeles to meet the stylist and the choreographer hired by Madonna, who e-mailed him with her ideas for the video. The director explained that he "kind of liked that we didn't have time to over-think this and be too clever, I like being out on a limb and not know what we're doing and why. Just deal with it, the mayhem, you know?"

Madonna wanted to use a few performers from her tour, such as Daniel "Cloud" Campos, Miss Prissy from LaChapelle's Rize crew and traceur Sebastien Foucan, a practitioner of Parkour, a philosophical French sport. Renck said that "It's not about the music, but the bodily expression, [...] We wanted to show the whole spectrum, be it krumping, breakdancing, jazz or disco." Since they could not shoot all over the world, Madonna wanted the video to have an "omnipresent feel", with the middle section of the song generating a sense of congregation. Renck suggested that they include a boombox, used as a means of uniting everyone and everything since it was through listening to songs on a boombox that street dancing started.

Madonna clarified that the video was a tribute to John Travolta and to dance in general. Her dance moves for the video, which were inspired by Travolta's movies like Saturday Night Fever (1977), Grease (1978) and Perfect (1985) took three hours to shoot. Madonna had broken eight bones in a horseback-riding accident a few weeks before shooting the video and faced difficulty doing the steps devised by choreographer Jamie King. Renck said,

"She was such a trooper, [...] She just fell off a horse! [Madonna said] 'If you were a real dance choreographer, you could tell I can't lift my left arm higher than this' — and it was like, what, a 20-centimeter difference? [...] But when she said it 'hurts like f---,' she'd take a break and sit down for two minutes. [Madonna]'I have broken ribs, remember that!' I just can't imagine dancing like that. Talk about priorities."

Madonna was also associated with the editing process of the video. She was Renck's editing supervisor. Madonna wanted a raw documentary look for the video which allowed her to be portrayed more realistically. Regarding the making of "Hung Up", Renck said that it was a massive work to undertake, "It's like you form this little family that's flourished and prospered for the month, and then you chop it down like a tree, [...] You come out with a sense of yearning and longing, like, 'Can we just do that again? Please?'"

=== Synopsis and reception ===
The video starts with Madonna entering and turning the lights on in a ballet studio carrying a boombox. She presses the play button on the boombox as the clock ticking sound of the music starts. Wearing a pink leotard, Madonna starts gyrating to the music while doing warm up exercises. The scene interchanges with a group of people on a rooftop who start dancing to the music while listening to a similar boombox. They also display aspects of the physical discipline Parkour, while climbing over buildings and jumping from staircases. As the song starts, Madonna dances to the music in the ballet studio. The second verse shows her continuing dancing while the people from the street take their boombox and board a taxi. Scenes are interspersed with people dancing in a Chinese restaurant and Parisian streets. In the meantime, Madonna finishes her dances in the ballet studio, drops her towel, changes her clothes and comes out on the street. The people in the taxi, exit the cab and take the Underground instead. After another round of dancing in the train, the intermediate music starts. Madonna is shown hugging, dancing, and conversing with choreographers on a deserted alleyway and riding on a boombox. As the song starts again, Madonna and the people from the street, who act as her background dancers, all dance on a Dancing Stage machine in a gaming parlor. The video ends showing Madonna lying on the ballet studio floor. The video was nominated for five awards at the 2006 MTV Video Music Awards including Best Female Video, Dance Video, Pop Video, Best Choreography and the Video of the Year award although it did not win any of them. In 2009, the video was included on Madonna's compilation, Celebration: The Video Collection.

== Live performances ==
On November 4, 2005, Madonna opened the 2005 MTV Europe Music Awards at the Pavilhão Atlântico in Lisbon, Portugal with her first performance of "Hung Up". She emerged from a glitterball to perform the song while wearing a purple leotard and matching leather boots. During next days, Madonna performed "Hung Up" on TV shows such as Wetten, dass..? in Germany, Parkinson in England and Star Academy in France, as well as on the Children in Need 2005 telethon in London. She opened her concerts at Koko and G-A-Y nightclubs in London with "Hung Up", respectively on November 15 and 19. In December Madonna travelled to Tokyo, Japan, where "Hung Up" was performed on TV show SMAP×SMAP and her concert at Studio Coast. On February 8, 2006, Madonna opened the 48th Annual Grammy Awards at the Staples Center in Los Angeles. She sang the song by pairing up with the fictional animated band Gorillaz. The band appeared on the stage via a three dimensional technique which projected their holograms on the stage. They performed their song "Feel Good Inc." while rappers De La Soul made a guest appearance. Madonna then appeared on the stage and started performing the song while interchanging places with the hologram figures of the band. She was later joined by her own group of dancers and the performance was finished on the main stage rather than the virtual screen. Another performance of "Hung Up" came on April 30, 2006, during the Coachella Valley Music and Arts Festival in Indio, California.

The song was performed as the last song of her 2006 Confessions Tour. It was performed at the last "disco fever" segment of the tour. During the performance, her dancers displayed the Parkour routine all over the stadium as the familiar ABBA sample played. Madonna changed her aerobics costume for a purple leotard. As the music progressed, she and her dancers appeared on the center stage and she started singing. During the second verse, she left her sunglasses and jacket and proceeded towards the front of the stage. A boombox appeared in the center with Madonna playing with it. The song starts again as balloons fall on the crowd from the top. The finale had Madonna engaging the audience to sing-along with her to the song while making a contest as to which side of the stadium can sing the loudest. Madonna then uttering the line "I'm tired of waiting for you" while the backdrop showed the phrase "Have You Confessed?". The New York Times' Ginia Belafonte compared this performance with that of Ethel Merman. Slant Magazine commented that the performance reminded Madonna's ability to encapsulate the audience as a part of her performance. On July 7, 2007, Madonna closed her set during the Live Earth concert at the Wembley Stadium in London with "Hung Up".

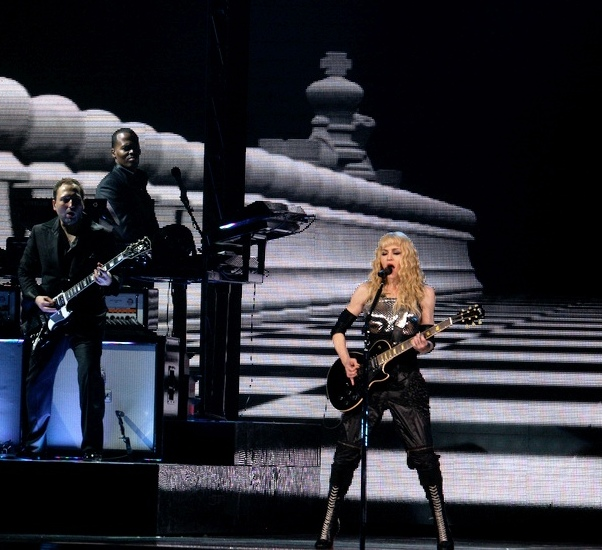
Madonna performing a rock version of "Hung Up" during the 2008 leg of the Sticky & Sweet Tour

The song was the fourth track of the Hard Candy promo tour set list in 2008. Madonna wore a shiny black outfit with black tails, Adidas track pants and high-heeled, lace-up boots. Madonna dedicated the performance to all the people who had waited outside in the queue to watch the show. She declared that the "noisy, metallic guitar breakdown" symbolised her brain during a long waiting. The song was performed in the futuristic rave with Japanese influences segment of the 2008 Sticky & Sweet Tour. Madonna wore a futuristic robotic outfit designed by Heatherette, with plates on her shoulder and a wig with long curled hair. The similar heavy-metal version of "Hung Up" was performed but it later gave way to the ABBA music. Before starting the performance, she played a capella versions of her older songs on audience demand, mostly "Express Yourself" and "Like a Virgin". However, after that, the electric guitar was played to make noises, which Madonna dedicated to Republican vice-presidential nominee for the 2008 election, Sarah Palin. She said, "I'd like to express myself to Sarah Palin right now. [Playing a screeching note on her guitar] This is the sound of Sarah Palin thinking. [...] Sarah Palin can't come to my party. Sarah Palin can't come to my show. It's nothing personal." The performance ended with Madonna playing the guitar riff of "A New Level" by heavy-metal band Pantera.

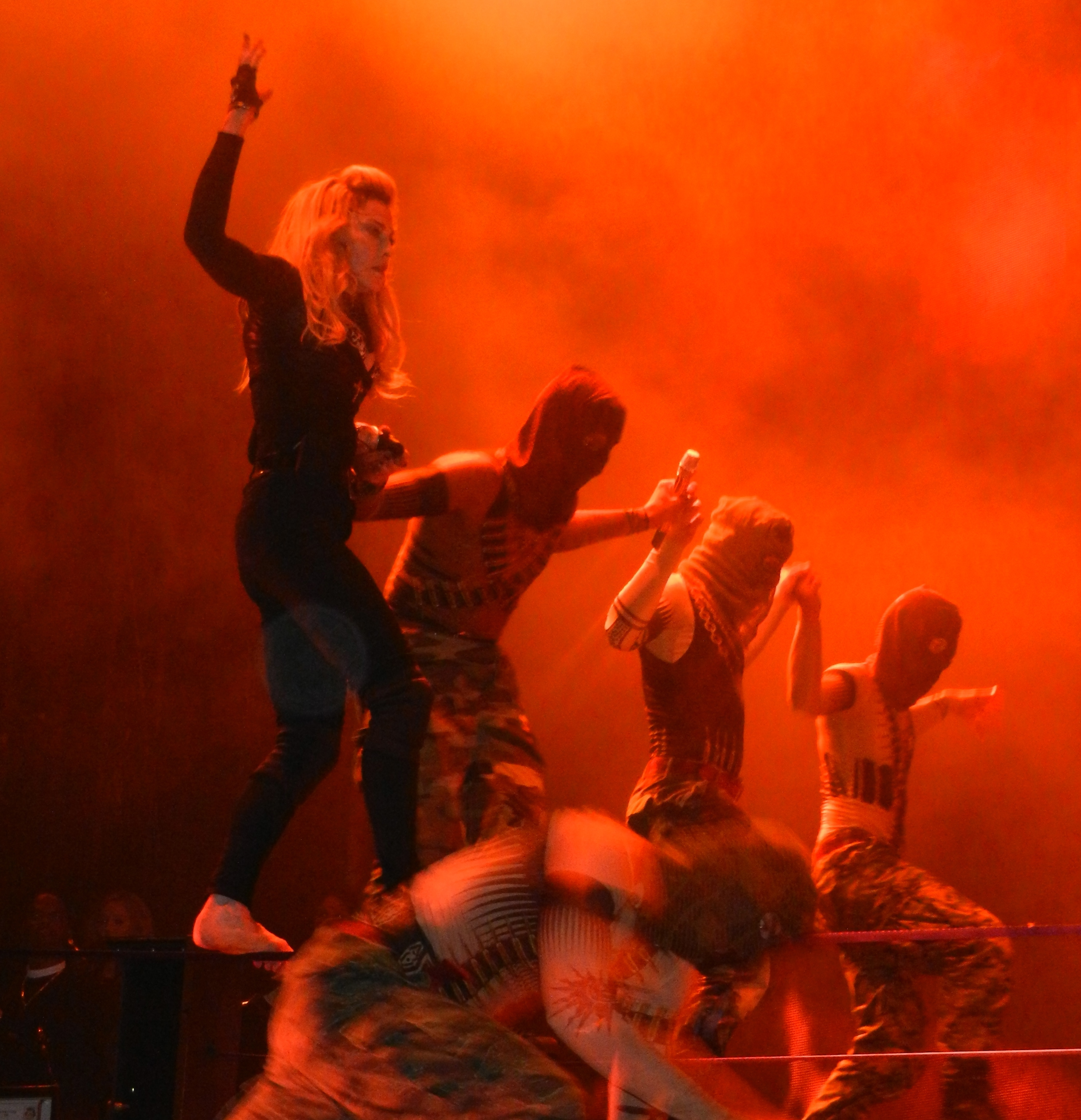
Madonna and her dancers slacklining during the performance of "Hung Up" on 2012's The MDNA Tour

For The MDNA Tour of 2012, "Hung Up" was added to the setlist as part of the opening segment, known as Transgression. After performing a fragment of "Papa Don't Preach", several dancers wearing tribal masks, surrounded Madonna, tied her up and proceeded to carry her to the center of the main stage just as the song's opening riffs, underpinned by the dramatic sound of church bells with vocoder vocals, started to play in the background. Dressed in a black skintight outfit with an ample cleavage, gloves of the same color and heeled boots, Madonna and her dancers performed the song while at the same time slacklining on some ropes held on the middle of the stage. As Madonna sang the song, her dancers slid under the ropes. This performance received generally mixed reviews, Jon Pareles from The New York Times believed that changing the composition of the song in lieu of the theme for the segment made it "ominous and obsessive", while making it "a memory of distant innocence". Jim Farber from the Daily News felt that the introduction of slacklining gave the whole tour "some needed bounce". Sal Cinquemani from Slant Magazine was negative on his review of the performance, as he felt it was out of place on the show's segment, and compared it negatively to the performance of the Sticky & Sweet Tour, concluding that the song "should never be performed in any way other than its original form." The performance of the song at the November 19–20, 2012 shows in Miami, at the American Airlines Arena, were recorded and released in Madonna's fourth live album, MDNA World Tour.

On April 13, 2015, Madonna made a surprise appearance at the Coachella Festival and performed a medley of her 1994 song "Human Nature" and "Hung Up" during Drake's act, sporting thigh-high boots and a tank top that read "Big as Madonna". She then went on to kiss Drake, whose shocked expression went viral on the Internet. The rapper then revealed that he actually enjoyed the kiss, posting a picture of the moment to his Instagram account which read: "Don't misinterpret my shock!! I got to make out with the queen Madonna and I feel 100 about that forever". The singer also performed an a cappella version of the song on her Rebel Heart Tour in Hong Kong on 17 February 2016.

On June 24, 2021, the singer made a surprise appearance at a pride party at the Boom Boom Room of New York's The Standard hotel and performed the song on top of the lounge's bar; she wore a see-through mesh top, leather shorts, a vintage Jean Paul Gaultier corset, a blue wig and long pink fingerless gloves. In June 2022, to accompany the remix album release, Finally Enough Love: 50 Number Ones, Madonna performed at Pride at the Women of the World Party in New York City. She performed a dembow, house-infused remix of "Hung Up", sharing a French kiss with Tokischa, in a similar fashion to her kiss with Britney Spears and Christina Aguilera at the 2003 MTV Video Music Awards. During the Celebration Tour of 2023–24, a mash-up of "Hung Up" and its remix, "Hung Up on Tokischa", was performed by Madonna amid topless dancers; Tokischa made an appearance on video. On June 4, 2026, Madonna performed the song during the surprise, free Pride Month concert at The Square in Times Square, produced and live streamed by Grindr.

== Remix version ==
In 2022, Madonna recorded a dembow remix of "Hung Up" with Dominican rapper Tokischa, newly titled "Hung Up on Tokischa". It features samples of Madonna's vocals from the original version in addition to new Spanish language verses written by Tokischa. It was released by Warner Records for digital download and streaming on September 16, 2022. Madonna and Tokischa first performed the song in June 2022 at Terminal 5 during the New York City Pride.

The song's accompanying music video was directed by Sasha Kasiuha and filmed on Labor Day, September 5, 2022, in Washington Heights in New York City. It pictures Madonna and Tokischa performing the song at a street party with a crowd gathered around them on the corner of West 175th Street and Audubon Avenue. It was reported that police interrupted the outdoor shoot due to complaints about the noise from neighbors. The video also includes scenes of Tokischa performing her verses at a local convenience store, and indoor scenes of Madonna and Tokischa caressing each other in suggestive positions of perreando style in front of an altar.

Rachel Kiley from Pride.com described it as a "raunchy romp" that leaves "very little to the imagination". The song was nominated at the 2023 Premios Juventud in the category Girl Power.

== Formats and track listings ==
- Benelux and French 2-track CD single; UK 2-track single CD1
1. "Hung Up" (Radio Version) – 3:23
2. "Hung Up" (Tracy Young's Get Up and Dance Groove Edit) – 4:16
- Asian, Argentine, Australian, European, French, Japanese, South African CD maxi-single; UK maxi-single CD2
1. "Hung Up" (Radio Version) – 3:23
2. "Hung Up" (Tracy Young's Get Up and Dance Groove Edit) – 4:16
3. "Hung Up" (SDP Extended Vocal) – 7:57
- Canadian, European and US CD maxi-single
1. "Hung Up" (Radio Version) – 3:23
2. "Hung Up" (SDP Extended Vocal) – 7:57
3. "Hung Up" (Tracy Young's Get Up and Dance Groove Edit) – 4:15
4. "Hung Up" (Bill Hamel Remix) – 6:58
5. "Hung Up" (Chus & Ceballos Remix) – 10:21
6. "Hung Up" (SDP Extended Dub) – 7:57
- European and UK 12-inch vinyl single
1. "Hung Up" (Album Version) – 5:38
2. "Hung Up" (SDP Extended Dub) – 7:57
3. "Hung Up" (SDP Extended Vocal) – 7:57
4. "Hung Up" (Tracy Young's Get Up and Dance Groove Edit) – 4:15
- European and US 2×12-inch vinyl
1. "Hung Up" (Album Version) – 5:38
2. "Hung Up" (SDP Extended Vocal) – 7:57
3. "Hung Up" (Bill Hamel Remix) – 6:58
4. "Hung Up" (SDP Extended Dub) – 7:57
5. "Hung Up" (DJ Chus & Ceballos Remix) – 10:21
6. "Hung Up" (Tracy Young's Get Up and Dance Groove) – 9:03
- Digital single
1. "Hung Up" (Radio Version) – 3:23
- Digital 3-track single
1. "Hung Up" (Radio Version) – 3:23
2. "Hung Up" (Tracy Young's Get Up and Dance Groove Edit) – 4:16
3. "Hung Up" (SDP Extended Vocal) – 7:57
- Digital EP 1
1. "Hung Up" (SDP Extended Vocal Edit) – 5:58
2. "Hung Up" (Tracy Young's Get Up and Dance Groove Edit) – 4:16
3. "Hung Up" (Bill Hamel Remix Edit) – 5:00
4. "Hung Up" (Chus & Ceballos Remix Edit) – 5:01
- Digital EP 2 (DJ version)
1. "Hung Up" (SDP Extended Vocal) – 7:57
2. "Hung Up" (Tracy Young's Get Up and Dance Groove) – 9:03
3. "Hung Up" (Bill Hamel Remix) – 6:59
4. "Hung Up" (Chus & Ceballos Remix) – 9:41
5. "Hung Up" (SDP Extended Dub) – 7:57
- Digital download – Free on Madonna's official mailing list, March 2006
1. "Hung Up" (Archigram Remix) – 6:59
- Digital single – 2022 remix
1. "Hung Up on Tokischa" (with Tokischa) – 3:21

== Credits and personnel ==
Credits adapted from the album's liner notes.

- Madonna – lead vocals, songwriter, producer
- Stuart Price – songwriter, producer
- Benny Andersson – songwriter
- Björn Ulvaeus – songwriter
- Giovanni Bianco – cover artwork
- Lorenzo Irico – digital imaging
- Steven Klein – photography
- Andy LeCompte – hair and makeup

== Charts ==
=== Weekly charts ===
Weekly chart performance for "Hung Up"
Chart (2005–2006)	Peak position
Australia (ARIA)	1
Austria (Ö3 Austria Top 40)	1
Belgium (Ultratop 50 Flanders)	1
Belgium (Ultratop 50 Wallonia)	1
Brazil Airplay (Crowley)	5
Canada (Nielsen SoundScan)	1
Canada AC Top 30 (Radio & Records)	28
Canada CHR/Top 40 (Radio & Records)	1
Canada Hot AC (Radio & Records)	1
Chile (Notimex)	1
CIS Airplay (TopHit)	1
Croatia International Airplay (Top lista)	1
Czech Republic Airplay (ČNS IFPI)	1
Denmark (Tracklisten)	1
European Hot 100 Singles (Billboard)	1
European Radio Airplay (Billboard)	1
Finland (Suomen virallinen lista)	1
France (SNEP)	1
Germany (GfK)	1
Global Dance (Billboard)	1
Greece (IFPI Greece)	2
Hungary (Rádiós Top 40)	1
Hungary (Single Top 40)	1
Ireland (IRMA)	2
Italy (FIMI)	1
Japan (Oricon)	59
Japan International (Oricon)	1
Netherlands (Dutch Top 40)	1
Netherlands (Single Top 100)	1
New Zealand (Recorded Music NZ)	2
Norway (VG-lista)	1
Paraguay (Notimex)	1
Romania (Romanian Top 100)	1
Russia Airplay (TopHit)	1
Scottish Singles Sales (Official Charts)	1
Spain (Promusicae)	1
Sweden (Sverigetopplistan)	1
Switzerland (Schweizer Hitparade)	1
Ukraine Airplay (TopHit)	3
UK Singles (Official Charts)	1
UK Dance (Official Charts)	1
Uruguay (Notimex)	1
US Billboard Hot 100	7
US Adult Contemporary (Billboard)	29
US Adult Pop Airplay (Billboard)	16
US Dance Club Songs (Billboard)	1
US Dance Singles Sales (Billboard)	1
US Dance Airplay (Billboard)	1
US Pop Airplay (Billboard)	17

Weekly chart performance for "Hung Up" since 2009
Chart (2009–2026)	Peak position
Japan Hot 100 (Billboard)	84
Kazakhstan Airplay (TopHit)	93
Norway Airplay (IFPI Norge)	73
Poland (Polish Airplay Top 100)	47

=== Hung Up on Tokischa ===
Weekly chart performance for "Hung Up on Tokischa"
Chart (2022)	Position
Honduras Anglo (Monitor Latino)	12
UK Singles Downloads (OCC)	55
US Dance/Electronic Digital Song Sales (Billboard)	12
US Latin Digital Song Sales (Billboard)	8

=== Year-end charts ===
2005 year-end chart performance for "Hung Up"
Chart (2005)	Position
Australia (ARIA)	49
Australia Dance (ARIA)	5
Austria (Ö3 Austria Top 40)	12
Belgium (Ultratop 50 Flanders)	28
Belgium (Ultratop 50 Wallonia)	7
Brazil (Crowley)	48
CIS (TopHit)	27
European Hot 100 Singles (Billboard)	18
France (SNEP)	10
Germany (Media Control GfK)	18
Hungary (Rádiós Top 40)	63
Ireland (IRMA)	13
Italy (FIMI)	2
Netherlands (Dutch Top 40)	30
Netherlands (Single Top 100)	9
New Zealand (RIANZ)	39
Russia Airplay (TopHit)	24
Spain (PROMUSICAE)	1
Sweden (Hitlistan)	11
Switzerland (Schweizer Hitparade)	18
Taiwan (Hito Radio)	20
UK Singles (OCC)	8
Venezuela Pop/Rock (Record Report)	46

2006 year-end chart performance for "Hung Up"
Chart (2006)	Position
Australia (ARIA)	38
Australia Dance (ARIA)	7
Austria (Ö3 Austria Top 40)	11
Belgium (Ultratop 50 Flanders)	55
Belgium (Ultratop 50 Wallonia)	42
Brazil (Crowley)	41
CIS (TopHit)	41
European Hot 100 Singles (Billboard)	2
France (SNEP)	50
Germany (Media Control GfK)	11
Greece (IFPI Greece)	37
Hungary (Rádiós Top 40)	10
Italy (FIMI)	8
Netherlands (Dutch Top 40)	57
Netherlands (Single Top 100)	88
Russia Airplay (TopHit)	72
Romania (Romanian Top 100)	40
Spain (PROMUSICAE)	10
Sweden (Hitlistan)	43
Switzerland (Schweizer Hitparade)	10
UK Singles (OCC)	63
US Billboard Hot 100	91
US Dance Club Play (Billboard)	27
US Hot Dance Airplay (Billboard)	18

Year-end chart performance
Chart (2025)	Position
Argentina Anglo Airplay (Monitor Latino)	88

=== Decade-end charts ===
Decade-end chart performance for "Hung Up"
Chart (2000–2009)	Position
CIS Airplay (TopHit)	79
Germany (Media Control GfK)	22
Russia Airplay (TopHit)	79
UK Singles (OCC)	66
US Dance Club Songs (Billboard)	1

=== All-time charts ===
All-time chart performance for "Hung Up"
Chart (2000–2012)	Position
UK 21st Century Singles (OCC)	136

== Certifications ==
Certifications and sales for "Hung Up"
Region	Certification	Certified units/sales
Australia (ARIA)	Platinum	70,000^{^}
Belgium (BRMA)	Platinum	50,000^{*}
Canada (Music Canada)	2× Platinum	40,000^{*}
Denmark (IFPI Danmark)	3× Platinum	24,000^{^}
France (SNEP)	Gold	500,000
Germany (BVMI)	3× Gold	500,000
Italy (FIMI)	Platinum	200,000 (Note: By January 2006, "Hung Up" had sold 100,000 units in Italy. Since 2009, it has registered additional 100,000 units in combined sales and streaming figures, for which it was certified platinum by the Federation of the Italian Music Industry (FIMI) in 2023.)
Japan (RIAJ) Digital	Platinum	250,000^{*}
Japan (RIAJ) Ringtone	2× Platinum	500,000^{*}
New Zealand (RMNZ)	Platinum	30,000^{‡}
Norway	—	46,000
Spain (Promusicae)	Gold	30,000^{‡}
Sweden (GLF)	3× Platinum	60,000^{^}
Switzerland (IFPI Switzerland)	Gold	20,000^{^}
United Kingdom (BPI)	2× Platinum	1,200,000
United States (RIAA)	Platinum	1,400,000
^{*} Sales figures based on certification alone.^{^} Shipments figures based on certification alone.^{‡} Sales+streaming figures based on certification alone.

== Release history ==
Release dates and formats for "Hung Up"
Region	Date	Format(s)	Label(s)	Ref.
Various	October 17, 2005	Digital download (Note: "Hung Up" was made available for digital download in 3-track and 4-track EP formats.)	Warner Bros.	
United States	October 18, 2005	Contemporary hit radio	Warner Bros.	
Germany	November 4, 2005	CD; maxi CD	Warner Music	
Australia	November 7, 2005	Maxi CD	Warner Music	
France	November 7, 2005	CD; maxi CD	Warner Music	
United Kingdom	November 7, 2005	CD; maxi CD	Warner Bros.	
Japan	November 9, 2005	Maxi CD	Warner Music	
United States	November 15, 2005	12-inch vinyl; maxi CD	Warner Bros.	
France	December 26, 2005	12-inch vinyl; maxi CD (limited edition)	Warner Music	

== See also ==
- List of number-one singles of 2005 (Australia)
- List of number-one hits of 2005 (Austria)
- List of Ultratop 50 number-one hits of 2005 (Belgium)
- List of Ultratop 40 number-one hits of 2005 (Belgium)
- List of number-one singles of 2005 (Canada)
- List of number-one singles of 2006 (Canada)
- List of number-one songs of the 2000s (Denmark)
- List of European number-one hits of 2005
- List of number-one singles of 2005 (Finland)
- List of number-one hits of 2005 (France)
- List of number-one hits of 2005 (Germany)
- List of number-one hits of 2006 (Germany)
- List of number-one hits of 2005 (Italy)
- List of number-one singles of 2005 (Netherlands)
- List of number-one songs in Norway
- List of number-one singles of 2005 (Spain)
- List of number-one singles of 2005 (Sweden)
- List of number-one singles of the 2000s (Switzerland)
- List of UK Singles Chart number ones of the 2000s
- List of UK Dance Singles Chart number ones of 2005
- List of number-one digital songs of 2005 (U.S.)
- List of number-one dance singles of 2005 (U.S.)
- List of number-one dance airplay hits of 2005 (U.S.)
- List of Romanian Top 100 number ones of the 2000s
- List of Platinum singles in the United Kingdom awarded since 2000
