= Crazy Frog Presents More Crazy Hits =

Studio album by Crazy Frog
- Released: June 27, 2006
- Recorded: 2005
- Genre: Dance
- Length: 31:43
- Labels: Ministry of Sound, Mach 1 GmbH, Warner Music (in certain territory)

Crazy Frog chronology
| Crazy Frog Presents Crazy Hits (2005) | Crazy Frog Presents More Crazy Hits (2006) | Everybody Dance Now (2009) |

Singles from Crazy Frog Presents More Crazy Hits
- 1. "We Are the Champions (Ding a Dang Dong)" Released: 2006; 2. "Last Christmas" Released: 2006; 3. "Crazy Frog in the House" Released: 2007

Professional ratings
Review scores
| Source | Rating |
|---|---|
| Allmusic | 2/5 stars |

Crazy Frog Presents More Crazy Hits is the second album from Crazy Frog, released in the UK on June 27, 2006, and in Canada on July 24. "We Are the Champions (Ding a Dang Dong)" was released as the lead single on June 6.

The European re-edition entitled "The Ultimate Edition" was released in December 2006 and featured few new songs (from the US edition), and also the single version of "Crazy Frog in the House (Knight Rider)" and "Last Christmas 2006". That re-edition included also the biggest hits from the previous album - "Axel F" and "Popcorn".

== Track listing ==
| No. | Title | Writer(s) | Original artist | Length |
|---|---|---|---|---|
| 1. | "Intro (Go Froggy Go)" | | Original song |
| 2. | "We Are the Champions (Ding a Dang Dong)" | Freddie Mercury | Queen | 3:03 |
| 3. | "Crazy Frog in the House (Knight Rider)" | Reinhard Raith; Wolfgang Boss; Stu Phillips; Glen A. Larson | | 3:20 |
| 4. | "I'm Too Sexy" | Fred Fairbrass; Richard Fairbrass; Rob Manzoli | Right Said Fred |
| 5. | "Hey Baby" | Margaret Cobb; Bruce Channel | Bruce Channel |
| 6. | "Crazy Jodeling" | | Original song |
| 7. | "The Final Countdown" | Joey Tempest | Europe |
| 8. | "I Will Survive" | Freddie Perren; Dino Fekaris | Gloria Gaynor |
| 9. | "Nellie the Elephant" | Ralph Butler; Peter Hart | Mandy Miller |
| 10. | "Ice Ice Baby" | Robert Van Winkle; Mario Johnson; Brian May; David Bowie; Mercury; John Deacon; Roger Taylor | Vanilla Ice |
| 11. | "Kiss Him Goodbye (Na Na Na, Hey Hey)" | Paul Leka; Gary DeCarlo; Dale Frashuer | Steam |
| 12. | "Copa Banana" | | Original song |
| 13. | "Go Froggy Go" | | Original song |
| 14. | "Rock Steady" |
| 15. | "Super Crazy Sounds" | | Original song |
| 16. | "Axel F" (video) | Harold Faltermeyer | Harold Faltermeyer |
| 17. | "Popcorn" (video) | Gershon Kingsley | Gershon Kingsley |
| 18. | "We Are The Champions (Ding A Dang Dong)" (video) | Mercury | Queen |
| 19. | "Photo Gallery" |
| Total length: | | | | 31:43 |

Deluxe edition bonus tracks
| No. | Title | Writer(s) | Original artist | Length |
|---|---|---|---|---|
| 16. | "Cotton Eyed Joe" | Janne Ericsson; Örjan Öban Öberg; Pat Reiniz | Rednex |
| 17. | "Blue (Da Ba Dee)" | Gianfranco Randone; Maurizio Lobina; Massimo Gabutti | Eiffel 65 |
| 18. | "Living on Video" | Pascal Languirand | Trans-X |
| 19. | "Everytime We Touch" | Stuart Mackilliop; Maggie Reilly; Peter Risavy | Cascada |
| 20. | "Axel F" | Faltermeyer | Harold Faltermeyer |
| 21. | "Last Christmas" | George Michael | Wham! | 4:27 |
| 22. | "Popcorn" | Kingsley | Gershon Kingsley | 3:12 |
| 23. | "In the 80's" | Henning Reith; Andreas Litterscheid; Raith; Boss | Original song | 3:32 |
| 27. | "Axel F" (New Version) (video) | Faltermeyer | Harold Faltermeyer |
| 28. | "Crazy Frog In The House (Knight Rider)" (video) | Raith; Boss; Phillips; Larson |
| 29. | "Last Christmas" (video) | Michael | Wham! |

== Charts ==
=== Weekly charts ===
Weekly chart performance
| Chart (2006) | Peak position |
|---|---|
| Australian Albums (ARIA) | 38 |
| Australian Dance Albums (ARIA) | 5 |
| Austrian Albums (Ö3 Austria) | 6 |
| Belgian Albums (Ultratop Flanders) | 1 |
| Belgian Albums (Ultratop Wallonia) | 6 |
| Canadian Albums (Billboard) | 1 |
| Czech Albums (ČNS IFPI) | 31 |
| Danish Albums (Hitlisten) | 1 |
| Finnish Albums (Suomen virallinen lista) | 14 |
| French Albums (SNEP) | 8 |
| German Albums (Offizielle Top 100) | 17 |
| Hungarian Albums (MAHASZ) | 15 |
| Italian Albums (FIMI) | 36 |
| Malaysian International Albums (RIM) | 5 |
| New Zealand Albums (RMNZ) | 20 |
| Norwegian Albums (VG-lista) | 11 |
| Polish Albums (ZPAV) | 13 |
| Portuguese Albums (AFP) | 23 |
| Scottish Albums (Official Charts) | 59 |
| Spanish Albums (Promusicae) | 84 |
| Swedish Albums (Sverigetopplistan) | 19 |
| Swedish Albums (Sverigetopplistan) Ultimate Edition | 59 |
| Swiss Albums (Schweizer Hitparade) | 14 |
| UK Albums (Official Charts) | 64 |
| UK Independent Albums (Official Charts) | 30 |
| US Billboard 200 | 40 |

=== Year-end charts ===
Year-end chart performance
| Chart (2006) | Position |
|---|---|
| Australian Dance Albums (ARIA) | 34 |
| Belgian Albums (Ultratop Flanders) | 54 |
| Danish Albums (Hitlisten) | 25 |
| French Albums (SNEP) | 117 |

== Certifications and sales ==
Certifications and sales
| Region | Certification | Certified units/sales |
|---|---|---|
| Canada | — | 51,000 |
| Denmark (IFPI Danmark) | Gold | 20,000^{^} |
| France (SNEP) | Gold | 75,000^{*} |
| New Zealand (RMNZ) | Gold | 7,500^{^} |
^{*} Sales figures based on certification alone.^{^} Shipments figures based on certification alone.
