= Axel F (Crazy Frog recording) =

Single by Crazy Frog

from the album Crazy Hits
- B-side: "In the 80's"
- Released: 17 May 2005
- Genre: Eurodance; novelty
- Length: 2:54 (radio edit); 2:50 (album version)
- Label: Catchy Tunes
- Songwriters: Harold Faltermeyer; Wolfgang Boss
- Producers: Henning Reith; Reinhard Raith; Off-cast Project

Crazy Frog singles chronology
| "Axel F" (2005) | "Popcorn" (2005) |

Music video
- "Axel F" on YouTube

"Axel F" is the debut single by Swedish CGI-animated character Crazy Frog and released on May 17, 2005, through Catchy Tunes. It is a Eurodance cover of the eponymous song by German musician Harold Faltermeyer, originally composed for the film Beverly Hills Cop (1984). The song peaked at number one on multiple international charts. A CGI-animated music video directed by Erik Wernquist depicts a killbot on a hovercycle attempting to hunt down the Crazy Frog character as he playfully rides an imaginary motorcycle through a city and sewers, ultimately surviving a guided missile attack.

== Background ==
In 2005, Crazy Frog, an animated CGI character created by ringtone provider Jamba! released a cover of "Axel F". The song, itself a re-working of the 2003 Murphy Brown/Captain Hollywood version, was created in response to a popular unauthorized song using the Crazy Frog ringtone audio. "Axel F" would become a chart topping hit across Europe and Australia in summer 2005, while achieving top 40 status in the United States.

Like "Axel F 2003", Crazy Frog's version was also produced by the Off-cast Project, and Henning Reith and Reinhard "DJ Voodoo" Raith, two members of the German dance production team Bass Bumpers. Wolfgang Boss and Jamster! arranged the remix.

The song consists of additional vocals taken from the 1997 recording "2TAKTARE.mp3" by Daniel Malmedahl. It uses mainly the same part of the two-minute original that was used in Jamster's release. There were three edits to the song.

== Commercial performance ==
Released across Europe in May 2005, "Axel F" topped the charts in the United Kingdom, with some of the best weekly sales of the year (out-selling rivals such as Coldplay by four copies to one), and remained at the top of the UK Singles Chart for four weeks to become Britain's third best-selling single of 2005 – and the country's best-selling single of 2005 by a non-British act – outselling and outperforming the original version. In other European countries, the popularity has differed, with the song failing to make the top 20 in Switzerland at first, before gradually climbing to number one, whilst reaching number three in Russia. It also reached number one on the overall European chart and stayed at number one until September. It also reached number one in Australia, Belgium, Denmark, France, Ireland, New Zealand, Norway, Spain, and Sweden. It was the number-one song of the year in Europe, New Zealand, and the Wallonia region of Belgium. The song was the 65th-best-selling single of the 2000s in the United Kingdom.

In France, the song entered at number 77 on the French Singles Chart on 11 June 2005, and moved all the way to number two the next week. There it stayed for two weeks before climbing to the summit, where it remained for thirteen weeks. It fell off the first position being dethroned by Crazy Frog's second single, "Popcorn". This was only the second time that an artist had ever dethroned themself in that country. The song remained in the top 10 for 21 weeks, 30 weeks in the top 50 and 36 weeks in the chart. Its best weekly sales were 103,564 on its 6th week. On 1 December 2005, it was certified diamond, 7 months after its release, by the French certifier SNEP. The song is the third best-selling single of the 21st century in France, with 1,270,000 units sold. (1,265,579 sales, according to another source).

Despite Crazy Frog not being as well known in Japan, the single release also charted there, peaking at number 46. It peaked at number 50 in the US. Although "Axel F" managed to find more success in mainstream markets, it proved to be a moderate success on the US Rhythmic Top 40, where it peaked at number 28. It also peaked at number three on the US Digital Sales chart. Its highest U.S. success was number two on the US Adult Contemporary Top 20. The song later became an Internet meme.

== Music video ==
The Ministry of Sound hired Kaktus Film and Erik Wernquist of TurboForce3D, the original creator of the 3D Crazy Frog, to produce a full-length animated music video to accompany the release of the song. An overview of the city is shown. Then someone in a van with attached satellite dishes and high-tech instruments on the interior sees a message on one of the monitor, which reads "Wanted: The most annoying thing in the world", referring to Crazy Frog, with a bounty of $50,000 specified for the catcher.

In 2011, the video was listed in NME's "50 Worst Music Videos", ranking at 47. In 2024, as part of a tribute to celebrate the release of Beverly Hills Cop: Axel F, the Crazy Frog YouTube Channel made a special crossover music video with Netflix, featuring scenes from the movie, but re-edited to feature Crazy Frog in them, being chased by the Beverly Hills Police and Axel Foley, the first time that Crazy Frog has ever interacted with the original franchise. As of February 2025, it has been viewed more than five billion times on YouTube.

== Track listings ==
- Australia
1. "Axel F" (radio edit) – 2:54
2. "Axel F" (club mix) – 6:23
3. "Axel F" (club mix instrumental) – 6:23
4. "Axel F" (album version) - 2:50
5. "In the 80's" – 3:29
- UK
1. "Axel F" (radio edit)
2. "Axel F" (Bounce mix)
3. "Axel F" (Bounce mix instrumental)
4. "Axel F" (Reservoir Frog remix)
5. "Axel F" (album version)
6. "Axel F" (video)

== Charts ==
=== Weekly charts ===
| Chart (2005–2006) | Peak position |
|---|---|
| Australia (ARIA) | 1 |
| Australian Dance (ARIA) | 1 |
| Austria (Ö3 Austria Top 40) | 2 |
| Belgium (Ultratop 50 Flanders) | 1 |
| Belgium (Ultratop 50 Wallonia) | 1 |
| CIS Airplay (TopHit) | 5 |
| Denmark (Tracklisten) | 1 |
| Europe (Eurochart Hot 100) | 1 |
| Finland (Suomen virallinen lista) | 2 |
| France (SNEP) | 1 |
| French Digital Songs (SNEP) | 1 |
| Germany (GfK) | 3 |
| Hungary (Single Top 40) | 1 |
| Hungary (Dance Top 40) | 9 |
| Ireland (IRMA) | 1 |
| Italy (FIMI) | 4 |
| Netherlands (Dutch Top 40) | 7 |
| Netherlands (Single Top 100) | 3 |
| New Zealand (Recorded Music NZ) | 1 |
| Norway (VG-lista) | 1 |
| Russia Airplay (TopHit) | 3 |
| Scottish Singles Sales (Official Charts) | 1 |
| Spain (Promusicae) | 1 |
| Sweden (Sverigetopplistan) | 1 |
| Switzerland (Schweizer Hitparade) | 1 |
| Ukraine Airplay (TopHit) | 4 |
| UK Singles (Official Charts) | 1 |
| UK Independent (Official Charts) | 1 |
| US Billboard Hot 100 | 50 |
| US Hot Dance Airplay (Billboard) | 12 |
| US Mainstream Top 40 (Billboard) | 40 |
| US Pop 100 (Billboard) | 34 |

==== Year-end charts ====
| Chart (2005) | Position |
|---|---|
| Australia (ARIA) | 4 |
| Australia Dance (ARIA) | 1 |
| Austria (Ö3 Austria Top 40) | 17 |
| Belgium (Ultratop 50 Flanders) | 2 |
| Belgium (Ultratop 50 Wallonia) | 1 |
| Brazil (Crowley) | 135 |
| CIS Airplay (TopHit) | 42 |
| Europe (Eurochart Hot 100) | 1 |
| France (SNEP) | 2 |
| France Club Chart | 23 |
| France Digital Chart | 7 |
| Germany (Media Control GfK) | 28 |
| Ireland (IRMA) | 4 |
| Italy (FIMI) | 18 |
| Netherlands (Dutch Top 40) | 33 |
| Netherlands (Single Top 100) | 42 |
| New Zealand (RIANZ) | 1 |
| Russia Airplay (TopHit) | 48 |
| Spain (Promusicae) | 2 |
| Sweden (Hitlistan) | 7 |
| Switzerland (Schweizer Hitparade) | 2 |
| Ukraine Airplay (TopHit) | 30 |
| UK Singles (OCC) | 3 |

==== Decade-end charts ====
| Chart (2000–2009) | Position |
|---|---|
| Australia (ARIA) | 52 |

== Certifications and sales ==
| Region | Certification | Certified units/sales |
|---|---|---|
| Australia (ARIA) | 2× Platinum | 140,000^{^} |
| Belgium (BRMA) | 2× Platinum | 100,000^{*} |
| Denmark (IFPI Danmark) | Gold | 4,000^{^} |
| France (SNEP) | Diamond | 1,270,000 |
| New Zealand (RMNZ) | 2× Platinum | 20,000^{*} |
| Sweden (GLF) | Platinum | 20,000^{^} |
| Switzerland (IFPI Switzerland) | Platinum | 40,000^{^} |
| United Kingdom (BPI) | Platinum | 694,000 |
| United States (RIAA) | 2× Platinum | 2,000,000^{‡} |
^{*} Sales figures based on certification alone.^{^} Shipments figures based on certification alone.^{‡} Sales+streaming figures based on certification alone.

== Release history ==
| Region | Date | Format(s) | Label(s) | Ref. |
|---|---|---|---|---|
| Germany | 17 May 2005 | CD | Mach1 | |
| Australia | 18 July 2005 | CD | Mach1; Warner Music International | |
| United States | 19 July 2005 | Contemporary hit radio | Universal | |
