= Wes Butters =

British broadcaster and writer (born 1979)

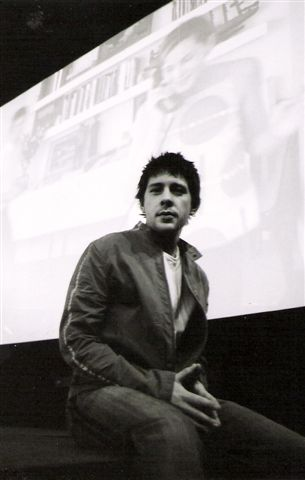
- Born: Wesley Paul Butters; 4 May 1979 (age 47); Salford, England
- Occupations: Writer and broadcaster
- Website: www.wesbutters.com

Wesley Paul Butters (born 4 May 1979) is a British radio broadcaster, formerly of BBC Radio 1, and writer.

== Early life ==
Butters attended Buile Hill High School in Pendleton, Salford, and studied at the University of Salford between 1995 and 1997, where he gained a National Diploma in Design & Media Communications, followed by a BA (Hons) Radio between 1997 and 1998.

== Radio career ==
On joining AA Roadwatch he shortened his name to Wes Butters. After a year presenting traffic and travel bulletins on local North West radio stations and periods on 96.5 Radio Wave (Blackpool), Wish FM (Wigan) and Century 105, he was offered the evening show on Century 106 in Nottingham. He left the station in 2000 to move to Newcastle as head of music and mid-morning presenter for Galaxy North East.

=== Radio 1 ===
In February 2003 Butters took over as host of The Radio 1 Chart Show on BBC Radio 1, and the programme was renamed The Official Chart Show with Wes. A change in the show's format led to greater coverage of top-selling albums and an end to the need for every entry in the Top 40 singles chart to be played.

He regularly stood in for Scott Mills – first on early breakfast, then on drive-time. He also deputised for Chris Moyles on the Radio 1 breakfast show on bank holidays and at Christmas.

Working closely with Top of the Pops, he interviewed hundreds of pop stars including Kylie Minogue, Destiny's Child, George Michael and The Black Eyed Peas.

In February 2005 Butters left Radio 1 and the chart show underwent further changes to its format.

Butters was regularly heard on the BBC World Service as well. He sat in for Steve Wright on Wright Round the World and was used as their voice for Live 8.

=== After Radio 1 ===
Soon after his final chart rundown on 30 January 2005 the press announced the launch of podshows.com, a joint venture by Butters and fellow broadcaster Daryl Denham. It was the world's first professional podcasting company, using presenters such as Tony Blackburn, Paul Gambaccini, Gary Davies and Terry Christian to record tailor-made programmes for MP3 players.

Butters produced "Ring Ding Ding", a house music track sampling the Crazy Frog ringtone. Following a positive reception when it was played on his early morning show on Radio 1, it was announced as a single. After legal challenges from copyright holder Jamster, it was released in June 2005, eventually charting at number 11.

=== Wes@Breakfast ===
In October 2005 Butters agreed a deal with Galaxy and returned to the airwaves at Galaxy Manchester, winning a Silver Sony award for Best Breakfast Show and an Arqiva nomination for Best UK Presenter in 2006.

In May 2007 he was voted North West England Presenter of the Year in the radio industry magazine X-Trax.

It was announced in June 2007 that Wes had "had enough of early starts" and that he wanted more time to focus on his other projects. Keen to keep him on the station he agreed with Galaxy to do a short afternoon show but in April 2008 he revealed that he would leave the group completely.

At the end of July 2008 Wes enjoyed another stint on breakfast, this time sitting in for Shaun Keaveny on BBC 6 Music.

=== Radio 4 Extra ===
Manager Simon Jordan invited Wes to join BBC Radio 7 in May 2009 as one of the station's continuity announcers. He remained after its revamp to BBC Radio 4 Extra, where he continues to introduce a range of comedy and drama from the BBC's archive.

=== BBC Radio Leeds ===
In October 2011, Butters was announced as BBC Radio Leeds's new mid-morning presenter. His programme, which contained phone ins, real-life stories, consumer issues and political interviews, became the highest rated on the station.

A forthright style when interviewing politicians led to national news coverage, as in the case of Labour MP George Mudie who admitted he would vote for an independent Scotland despite his party being part of the Better Together campaign.

Butters left in October 2014, referring in a statement to Kenny Everett who famously abandoned parties as they were just getting going.

=== Bauer City Network ===
In 2016, Butters signed to host a weekly network show for Bauer City 1 broadcasting on Key 103, CFM, Free Radio, Hallam FM, Metro Radio, Radio Aire, Radio City, Rock FM, TFM and Viking FM. And in August 2017, he replaced Paddy McGuinness as host of Sunday mornings.

=== Hits Radio Network ===
As of 2020, Butters hosts the drive-time slot across the Hits Radio Network alongside Gemma Atkinson. He also presents Sunday Breakfast across the Hits Radio Network alongside Sheree Murphy.

As of 2025, Butters hosts the Weekend Breakfast on Hits Radio, taking over Sunday Breakfast from Mary Mandefield, expanding his show onto Saturday and Sunday from 6am to 9am.

== Television, writing and film ==
Butters has appeared on many TV programmes including Never Mind the Buzzcocks, Top of the Pops, Liquid News, Celebrity Fame Academy, Record of the Year, Jacques Peretti's 50 Years of Bad Sex, Carry On Forever and BBC television news, in addition to a range of children's programmes. As a voice-over, he has been heard on An Audience with Take That, An Audience with Lionel Richie and The Brit Awards, as well as the Top of the Pops rundown and ads for Asda. He also appeared as himself announcing Billy Mack—the character played by Bill Nighy—as the Christmas number one in Richard Curtis's 2003 romantic comedy Love Actually.

Butters has written for a number of newspapers (including The Guardian), while his debut book, a biography of Carry On actor Kenneth Williams, came out in October 2008. Published by HarperCollins, Kenneth Williams Unseen was selected by Roger Lewis as one of The Daily Express Books of the Year. He also wrote the two-part documentary The Pain of Laughter – The Last Days of Kenneth Williams for BBC Radio 4, broadcast in April 2008, which is available on his website.

In May 2010, his second book, Whatshisname, The Life and Death of Charles Hawtrey, was released.

Butters directed and edited the 2025 documentary The Last Years of Kenneth Williams..

== Personal life ==
Butters has a daughter, to whom both of his books are dedicated. He has a fiancé whom he proposed to in New York in 2019.

Butters suffers from colitis and often speaks of the condition to help raise awareness and his "fellow sufferers".

Media offices
Preceded by Various presenters	BBC Radio 1 chart show presenter 9 February 2003 – 30 January 2005	Succeeded by Various presenters
