= Resource (band) =

German electronic music group, 2001–2006

- Origin: Germany
- Genre: Electronic dance
- Years active: 2001–2006
- Labels: Bigroom, Bump
- Past members: Henning Reith; Reinhard Raith; Frank Knebel; Wolfgang Boss

Resource was a German electronic dance production and remix group, consisting of producers Frank Knebel, Henning Reith, Reinhard Raith, and Wolfgang Boss. They released one single in 2003, "(I Just Died) In Your Arms", in three countries (Germany, United Kingdom and Australia) and two other 12" records were later released in Germany. They have also remixed several dance songs.

== Discography ==
=== Single ===
List of singles, with selected chart positions
Title	Year	Peak chart positions			
Title	Year	GER	AUS	SPA	UK
"(I Just) Died in Your Arms"	2003	48	43	15	42

=== Vinyl ===
- "18 Mne Uzhe"
- "More Than a Feeling"

=== Remixes ===
- Flip & Fill - "I Wanna Dance With Somebody"
- Phoenix 2003 - "Dreamer"
- Adrima - "Rainbowland (Follow Me)"
- L'Na - "Urgent"
- Coco vs. Jet - "Loving Arms 2003"
- Crazy Frog - "Popcorn"
