= Crazy Frog Racer =

2005 video game

- Box artwork for the Nintendo DS version.
- Developer: Neko Entertainment
- Publisher: Digital Jesters
- Platforms: PlayStation 2, Nintendo DS, Microsoft Windows, Game Boy Advance
- Release: 2005
- Genre: Racing
- Modes: Single-player, multiplayer

Crazy Frog Racer is a European and Australian-only video game developed by Neko Entertainment and published by Digital Jesters. A year later in 2006 a sequel was released, titled Crazy Frog Racer 2.

== Gameplay ==
In the PlayStation 2 and PC versions, players race as the Annoying Thing, an animated character, across four tracks to come in 1st place. As they race, there are coins scattered across the tracks that give the player 500 points for each coin picked up, which can be used to buy bonuses during races. There are four modes, each played differently:

- Single race: Up to two players race on a track of their choosing.
- Time trials: The player completes a track as fast as they can.
- Chase: While playing as the Annoying Thing, players must run from several Drones for as long as they can.
- Arena: A two-player mode where players battle it out in a chosen arena.

In the Game Boy Advance version, players can play as The Annoying Thing along with seven other characters: Big Elk, Dream Boy, Puschel, Rasta Dog, Punk Girl, Mafia Hen, and Toro. Similarly to the 2001 video game Mario Kart: Super Circuit, players race across tracks to win and use power-ups to stop their opponents along the way. Unlike the PS2 and PC version, the GBA version has four modes but no multiplayer:

- Tournament: The main game mode where the player must race across four tracks in the Bronze, Silver, and Gold Cups at a chosen engine class (50cc, 100cc, 150cc).
- Checkpoint rallye: On a selected track, players race to the next checkpoint before time runs out.
- Checkpoint madness: Similar to checkpoint rallye, but has the player competing against the AI.
- Last man standing: A survival mode where players attack their opponents with items to be the last one standing.

== Reception ==
Reception

Aggregate score
Aggregator	Score
GameRankings	(PS2) 28% (NDS) 20% (PC) 5% (GBA) 10%

Review scores
Publication	Score
Jeuxvideo.com	(PS2) 3/20 (PC) 3/20 (NDS) 1/20
Joystick	(PC) 0/10
PlayStation Official Magazine – UK	(PS2) 2/10
PALGN	(PS2) 2.5/10
Cubed3	(GBA) 1/10

Crazy Frog Racer received negative reviews with an aggregate review score of 28% by GameRankings for the PlayStation 2 release. PlayStation Official Magazine's Paul Fitzpatrick found that the game "reeks of fad-exploitation rush-job", feeling like it had been "cobbled together in a couple of hours", with the "worst track design that [the magazine had] ever seen".
