= Jingle Bells / U Can't Touch This =

2005 double A-side single by Crazy Frog

"Jingle Bells" / "U Can't Touch This"

Single by Crazy Frog

from the album Crazy Frog Presents Crazy Hits (Crazy Christmas edition)
- Released: 28 November 2005
- Genre: Christmas
- Length: 2:37 ("Jingle Bells"); 3:17 ("U Can't Touch This"); 3:22 ("Last Christmas")
- Label: Warner Music International; Gusto
- Producer: Erik Wernquist

Crazy Frog singles chronology
"Popcorn" (2005)	"Jingle Bells" / "U Can't Touch This" (2005)	"We Are the Champions (Ding a Dang Dong)" (2006)

Music videos
- "Jingle Bells" on YouTube; "Last Christmas" on YouTube

Audio video
- "U Can't Touch This" on YouTube

"Jingle Bells" and "U Can't Touch This" are two cover songs by Swedish CGI character Crazy Frog. The two songs are the traditional Christmas song "Jingle Bells" and MC Hammer's 1990 single "U Can't Touch This". In Australia, New Zealand, and several mainland European countries, a cover of Wham!'s "Last Christmas" was added as an A-side instead and issued as "Jingle Bells" / "Last Christmas".

"Jingle Bells" / "Last Christmas" was the more successful of the two versions, as it was released in late November 2005 to coincide with the Christmas holiday period. It peaked atop the charts of New Zealand and Spain and was also a top-five hit in Australia, Belgium, and France. In France, its 2005 sales were estimated at 84,367. "Jingle Bells" / "U Can't Touch This" was released in the British Isles instead, peaking at number five on the UK Singles Chart and number 11 in Ireland.

== Music videos ==
=== "Jingle Bells" ===
The video starts with the Crazy Frog playing in the snow with the bounty hunter robot from previous clips (in some clips, Crazy Frog's genitals are censored). It then shows flashbacks from clips of "Axel F," the Hall of Mirrors video, and the Crazy DJ clip, then more of the "Axel F" clip. The flashbacks end, and the bounty hunter robot begins to throw a snowball at the frog. But instead, he kisses the bounty hunter robot, and his lips get stuck to it, until the robot pulls him off. They then make snow angels, and a message reads "Have a ding dong Christmas, everyone!"

=== "U Can't Touch This" ===
The video shows a shortened version of the events of "Popcorn", another video by the Crazy Frog. The video starts with the Crazy Frog fishing on a raft. He catches something (that turns out to be a giant robot under construction) and tries so hard to reel it in that he is pulled off the raft into the water. He then puts on a pair of goggles and starts swimming away from a group of robots. The Crazy Frog starts DJing, and the robots who were once chasing him all dance in unison. The giant robot then tries to stomp on him and kill him, so he comes back to the surface, which is where the video ends.

== Track listings ==
UK

1. "Jingle Bells" (radio mix)
2. "U Can't Touch This" (video mix) – 2:04
3. "Jingle Bells" (club vocal mix)
4. "I Like To Move It" (club mix)

Enhanced Section:

1. "Jingle Bells" (video)
2. "U Can't Touch This" (video)
3. "Jingle Bells" (U-MYX format)

Australia

1. "Jingle Bells" – 2:37
2. "Last Christmas" – 3:22
3. "U Can't Touch This" – 3:17

France

1. "Jingle Bells" (single mix) – 2:37
2. "Jingle Bells" (new club mix) – 5:21
3. "Jingle Bells" (new vocal mix) – 5:21
4. "Last Christmas" (single mix) – 3:22

== Charts ==
All entries charted as "Jingle Bells" / "Last Christmas", except where noted.

=== Weekly charts ===
Chart (2005–2007)	Peak position
Australia (ARIA)	4
Australian Dance (ARIA)	1
Belgium (Ultratop 50 Flanders)	2
Belgium (Ultratop 50 Wallonia)	3
CIS Airplay (TopHit) "Last Christmas"	147
Europe (Eurochart Hot 100)	2
France (SNEP)	5
Ireland (IRMA) "Jingle Bells" / "U Can't Touch This"	11
Netherlands (Dutch Top 40)	31
Netherlands (Single Top 100)	32
New Zealand (Recorded Music NZ)	1
Russia Airplay (TopHit) "Last Christmas"	139
Scottish Singles Sales (Official Charts) "Jingle Bells" / "U Can't Touch This"	3
Spain (Promusicae)	1
Sweden (Sverigetopplistan)	10
Ukraine Airplay (TopHit) "Last Christmas"	80
Ukraine Airplay (TopHit) "U Can't Touch This"	173
UK Singles (Official Charts) "Jingle Bells" / "U Can't Touch This"	5
UK Indie (Official Charts) "Jingle Bells" / "U Can't Touch This"	2

=== Year-end charts ===
Chart (2005)	Position
Australian Dance (ARIA)	17
Belgium (Ultratop 50 Wallonia)	69
France (SNEP)	83
New Zealand (RIANZ)	10
UK Singles (OCC)	101

Chart (2006)	Position
Australian Dance (ARIA)	17
Europe (Eurochart Hot 100)	98

== Certifications ==
Region	Certification	Certified units/sales
Australia (ARIA)	Gold	35,000^{^}
New Zealand (RMNZ)	Gold	5,000^{*}
^{*} Sales figures based on certification alone.^{^} Shipments figures based on certification alone.

== Release history ==
Region	Date	Format(s)	Label(s)	Ref.
Australia	28 November 2005	CD	Warner Music International	
United Kingdom	12 December 2005	CD	Gusto	
