= We Are the Champions =

1977 single by Queen

- UK single picture sleeve

Single by Queen

from the album News of the World
- B-side: "We Will Rock You"
- Released: 7 October 1977
- Recorded: 1977
- Genre: Arena rock; hard rock
- Length: 2:59
- Label: EMI (UK); Elektra (US)
- Songwriter: Freddie Mercury
- Producers: Queen, assisted by Mike Stone

Queen singles chronology
"Long Away" (1977)	"We Are the Champions" and "We Will Rock You" (1977)	"Spread Your Wings" (1978)

Music video
- "We Are the Champions" on YouTube

"We Are the Champions" is a song by the British rock band Queen, released as a double A-side single alongside "We Will Rock You" from the band's sixth album News of the World (1977). Written by lead singer Freddie Mercury, it remains one of rock's most recognisable anthems. The song was a worldwide success, reaching number 2 in the UK, number 4 on the Billboard Hot 100 in the US, number 3 in Canada, and the top 10 in many other countries. In 2009, it was inducted into the Grammy Hall of Fame and was voted the world's favourite song in a 2005 Sony Ericsson world music poll.

Written with audience participation in mind, Mercury said "We" in the song's title refers to everyone who is singing it. Brian May called the song "unifying and positive". "We Are the Champions" has become an anthem for victories at sporting events, including its use during the 1994 FIFA World Cup, and has been often used or referenced in popular culture. The song has also been covered by many artists.

On 7 October 2017, Queen released a Raw Sessions version of the track to celebrate the 40th anniversary of the release of News of the World. It was made from previously unheard vocal and instrumental takes from the original multi-track tapes. It also presents for the first time the original recorded length of the track, which is two choruses more than the 1977 edited single.

== Music ==
Writing of "We Are the Champions" began as early as 1975. However, at the time, Freddie Mercury deemed it unsuitable for inclusion in the band's then-current album, and the song was not recorded until 1977. It embodies numerous elements of arena rock, with Brian May stating, "We wanted to get the crowds waving and singing. It's very unifying and positive."

"We Are the Champions"
Featuring Mercury on piano, Classic FM called "We Are the Champions" a "bombastic monument of an anthem", with "its soaring, triumphant melody known at sporting events and award ceremonies the world over".

Musically, it is based on Mercury's piano part, with Roger Taylor and John Deacon providing a drums and bass guitar backing. May overdubbed some guitar sections, initially subtle, but building to a "solo" played simultaneously with the last chorus. Mercury employed complex and advanced harmony, including major and minor 6th, minor 7th, minor 11th, half-diminished, and diminished chords, and the choruses featured some of these voiced as four-part vocal harmonies. The lead vocal is very demanding and strident (highest point is a C5 both belted and in falsetto), with one of Mercury's most notable performances taking place at the Live Aid concert, at Wembley Stadium, London in 1985.

The single featured "We Will Rock You", which preceded the song on the album, as its B-side. The two songs were often played consecutively at the close of Queen concerts, and are customarily played together on radio broadcasts (in album order). Keeping with tradition, the two songs were also used to close the 1992 Freddie Mercury Tribute Concert with all the show's acts joining in behind the lead vocal of Liza Minnelli.

== Reception ==
Cash Box said that it contains "heroic lyrics and rapid changes in dynamics and emotional intensity" and praised guitarist Brian May's "dark backing lines and rippling fills." Record World called it a "stately rocker well-suited to its title" and suggested that "it could serve as a sort of new wave anthem."

== Music video ==
The video for "We Are the Champions" was filmed at a special video shoot with fan club members at the New London Theatre on 6 October 1977 and was directed by Derek Burbridge. Mercury performs in a trademark Harlequin outfit – a half black, half white version – in front of an enthusiastic crowd who wave Queen scarves in a manner similar to English football fans. An alternate version which starts in monochrome before blasting into colour as the drums and guitars kick in was broadcast on the BBC's Top of the Pops 2 and comprises alternate footage shot on the same day.

== Legacy ==
In some ways the definitive Queen song, from its balladic verses to its anthemic chorus, "Champions" has an eternal lock on sports stadium playlists.

— Gary Graff for Billboard magazine, January 2018.

The first sports team known to celebrate a world championship victory with Queen's "We Are the Champions" was Team Canada's 1978 World Field Lacrosse Championship team, which won the title in Stockport, England. The song has since become an enduring global anthem for sports victories.

In 2011, a team of scientific researchers concluded that "We Are the Champions" was the catchiest song in the history of pop music, despite its not reaching #1 in the charts in any major market. Dr. Daniel Mullensiefen said of the study: "Every musical hit is reliant on maths, science, engineering and technology; from the physics and frequencies of sound that determine pitch and harmony, to the hi-tech digital processors and synthesisers which can add effects to make a song catchier. We've discovered that there's a science behind the sing-along and a special combination of neuroscience, math and cognitive psychology that can produce the elusive elixir of the perfect sing-along song."

The song is popular at sporting events, often being played after a major victory by the home team. For example, it was played at Highmark Stadium after the Buffalo Bills defeated the New England Patriots in the 2021 NFL playoffs.

== Chart performances ==
In 1977–1978, "We Are the Champions" was released as a single in many countries, reaching number 2 on the UK Singles Chart; number 4 on Billboard in the US; number 3 in Canada; the top 10 in Ireland, the Netherlands, and Norway; and the top 15 in Germany, Austria, and Sweden. By November 2018, "We Are the Champions" had sold 962,000 copies in the UK, making it Queen's second highest-selling single in the country.

In 1992, 1993, and 1998, the single was re-released in France, totaling 45 weeks on the chart and peaking at number 19, number 14, and number 10 during the 1998 FIFA World Cup.

== Personnel ==
Information is based on the album's Liner Notes

- Freddie Mercury – lead and backing vocals, piano
- Brian May – guitars, backing vocals
- Roger Taylor – drums, backing vocals
- John Deacon – bass guitar

== Track listings ==
7" single (1977 release)

1. "We Are the Champions" – 3:00
2. "We Will Rock You" – 2:00

3" CD single (1988 release)

1. "We Are the Champions" – 3:02
2. "We Will Rock You" – 2:02
3. "Fat Bottomed Girls" – 3:23

CD single (1992 release)

1. "We Are the Champions" – 2:59
2. "We Will Rock You / We Are the Champions" – 5:00

== Charts ==
=== Weekly charts ===
Chart (1977–1978)	Peak position
Australia (KMR)	8
Austrian Singles Chart	12
Belgium (Ultratop 50 Flanders)	10
Belgium (Ultratop 50 Wallonia)	8
Canadian RPM Top Singles	3
German Singles Chart	13
Irish Singles Chart	3
Netherlands (Dutch Top 40)	2
Netherlands (Single Top 100)	2
New Zealand (RIANZ)	8
Norwegian Singles Chart	6
Swedish Singles Chart	14
UK Singles (Official Charts)	2
US Billboard Hot 100	4
US Cash Box Top 100	3

Chart (1992–1994)	Peak position
Australia (ARIA) with "We Will Rock You"	81
Dutch Mega Top 100	27
French Singles Chart	14
US Billboard Hot 100	52

Chart (1998)	Peak position
French Singles Chart	10

Chart (2006)	Peak position
US Billboard Hot Digital Songs	61

Chart (2010)	Peak position
Spain (Promusicae)	28

Chart (2016)	Peak position
Poland Airplay (ZPAV)	50
Portugal (AFP)	92

Chart (2018)	Peak position
Canada (Hot Canadian Digital Songs)	28
Italy (FIMI)	88
Japan Hot 100 (Billboard)	27
US Hot Rock & Alternative Songs (Billboard)	11

Chart (2019)	Peak position
US Hot Rock & Alternative Songs (Billboard); Live Aid edition	26

Chart (2023)	Peak position
Hungary (Single Top 40)	14

=== Year-end charts ===
Chart (1977)	Position
UK Singles Chart	23
Chart (1978)	Position
Australia (Kent Music Report)	57
Austrian Singles Chart	25
Canadian Top Singles	27
US Billboard Hot 100	25
US Cash Box	25
Chart (1998)	Position
French Singles Chart	72
Chart (2018)	Position
US Hot Rock Songs (Billboard)	99
Chart (2019)	Position
US Hot Rock Songs (Billboard)	34

== Certifications and sales ==
Region	Certification	Certified units/sales
Brazil (Pro-Música Brasil)	Gold	30,000^{‡}
Denmark (IFPI Danmark)	Platinum	90,000^{‡}
France (SNEP) Original release	Gold	500,000^{*}
France (SNEP) 1998 re-release	Gold	250,000^{*}
Germany (BVMI)	Platinum	500,000^{‡}
Italy (FIMI)	2× Platinum	200,000^{‡}
New Zealand (RMNZ)	2× Platinum	60,000^{‡}
Spain (Promusicae)	Platinum	60,000^{‡}
United Kingdom (BPI) 1977 physical sales	Gold	500,000^{^}
United Kingdom (BPI) Sales + streams since 2011	2× Platinum	1,200,000^{‡}
United States (RIAA) 1977 vinyl release	Platinum	2,000,000^{^}
United States (RIAA) 2003 digital release	4× Platinum	4,000,000^{‡}
^{*} Sales figures based on certification alone.^{^} Shipments figures based on certification alone.^{‡} Sales+streaming figures based on certification alone.

== Hank Marvin version ==
In 1992, Hank Marvin recorded a version of the song featuring Brian May on guitar. Royalties from the single were donated to the Terrence Higgins Trust. The song peaked at number 66 on the UK charts.

=== CD-single track listing ===
1. "We Are the Champions" (4:55)
2. "Moontalk" (3:13)
3. "Into the Light" (4:00)
- Tracks 1–2 performed by Hank Marvin featuring Brian May
- Track 2-3 performed by Hank Marvin

== Scorpions version ==
In 2004, German rock band Scorpions with Michael Kleitman released their version retitled "You Are the Champion". This special version was recorded in honour of Michael Schumacher winning his seventh F1 Formula One Championship. The song was slightly re-written, most notably changing "We" to "You" which is a direct reference to Schumacher. The song peaked at number 92 on the German Singles Chart. It was subsequently included on the album Stand Up for the Champion – Michael Schumacher in 2006 when he decided to retire from Formula One racing.

=== CD-single track listing ===
1. "You Are the Champion" (3:31)
2. "You Are the Champion" (Instrumental) (3:31)
3. "E Sara Perche (Spread Your Wings)" (3:12)
- Tracks 1–2 performed by Scorpions and Michael Kleitman
- Track 3 performed by Michael Kleitman

== Crazy Frog version ==
"We Are the Champions (Ding a Dang Dong)"

Single by Crazy Frog

from the album Crazy Frog Presents More Crazy Hits
- Released: 5 June 2006
- Recorded: 2005
- Genre: Dance; electronic
- Length: 3:03
- Label: Ministry of Sound
- Songwriter: Freddie Mercury
- Producer: Erik Wernquist

Crazy Frog singles chronology
"Jingle Bells" / "U Can't Touch This" (2005)	"We Are the Champions (Ding a Dang Dong)" (2006)	"Last Christmas" (2006)

Music video
- "We Are the Champions (Ding a Dang Dong)" on YouTube

A cover version by Crazy Frog titled "We Are the Champions (Ding a Dang Dong)" was released as a single on 5 June 2006, to coincide with the 2006 FIFA World Cup. Vocal arrangements include a sample portion of Queen's original recording.

=== Music video ===
The music video depicts Crazy Frog in bed dreaming that he is competing in a football match against Killbots. When the music video was originally released online, it appeared as it was released. However, the current version lacks the ball being kicked and the accompanying sound effects.

After being internationally released, it was shown before the animated movie Cars.

=== Chart performance ===
The single had its greatest success in France. It went straight to #1 on 10 June 2006, and stayed at this position for five weeks. It remained for nine weeks in the Top 10, seventeen weeks in the top fifty, and twenty five weeks in the chart. On 30 August 2006, it was certified Gold disc two months after its release by SNEP, the French certifier, and became the fifteenth best selling single in 2006 in that country.

=== Track listings ===
CD single

1. "We Are the Champions (Ding a Dang Dong)" (radio edit) – 2:57
2. "We Are the Champions (Ding a Dang Dong)" (club mix) – 5:49

Maxi single

1. "We Are the Champions (Ding a Dang Dong)" (radio edit) – 2:57
2. "We Are the Champions (Ding a Dang Dong)" (house mix) – 6:04
3. "We Are the Champions (Ding a Dang Dong)" (club mix) – 5:51
4. "We Are the Champions (Ding a Dang Dong)" (club mix dub) – 5:17
5. "We Are the Champions (Ding a Dang Dong)" (video)

=== Charts ===
==== Weekly charts ====
Chart (2006)	Peak position
Australia (ARIA)	13
Austria (Ö3 Austria Top 40)	4
Belgium (Ultratop 50 Flanders)	10
Belgium (Ultratop 50 Wallonia)	2
Denmark (Tracklisten)	3
Europe (Eurochart Hot 100)	2
Finland (Suomen virallinen lista)	10
France (SNEP)	1
Germany (Official German Charts)	10
Ireland (IRMA)	23
Italy (FIMI)	13
Malaysian International Albums (RIM); CD single	3
Netherlands (Single Top 100)	100
New Zealand (Recorded Music NZ)	30
Spain (Promusicae)	2
Sweden (Sverigetopplistan)	11
Switzerland (Schweizer Hitparade)	5
UK Singles (Official Company Charts)	11
Chart (2010)	Peak position
Spain (Promusicae)	32

==== Year-end charts ====
Chart (2006)	Position
Austria (Ö3 Austria Top 40)	44
Belgium (Ultratop 50 Flanders)	36
Belgium (Ultratop 50 Wallonia)	12
France (SNEP)	15
Germany (Media Control GfK)	86
Sweden (Hitlistan)	76
Switzerland (Schweizer Hitparade)	23

=== Certifications and sales ===
Region	Certification	Certified units/sales
Belgium (BRMA)	Gold	25,000^{*}
France (SNEP)	Gold	200,000^{*}
^{*} Sales figures based on certification alone.

== Queen + Adam Lambert version ==
"You Are the Champions"

Single by Queen + Adam Lambert
- Released: 1 May 2020
- Recorded: 2020
- Genre: Arena rock; hard rock
- Length: 2:07
- Label: Virgin EMI
- Producers: Brian May; Roger Taylor

Queen + Adam Lambert singles chronology
"You Are the Champions" (2020)	"The Show Must Go On (Live at O2 Arena, 4 July 2018)" (2020)

Music video
- "You Are the Champions" on YouTube

During the COVID-19 pandemic, May, Taylor and Adam Lambert released "You Are the Champions" on 1 May 2020, with proceeds going to the COVID-19 Solidarity Response Fund. In 2020, "You Are the Champions" peaked at #46 on the Billboard Hot Rock & Alternative Songs chart. The song also debuted on the UK Singles Chart at #95 in 2020. On 5 August 2020 limited edition CD and 7" vinyl versions of the single were announced with 3,000 copies each. The physical versions both charted on #1 in their specific UK Official Charts on 28 August 2020.

=== Track listings ===
- 7-inch vinyl and CD single
1. "You Are the Champions" – 2:07
2. "You Are the Champions" (Instrumental version) – 2:07
- Digital download and streaming
1. "You Are the Champions" – 2:07

=== Weekly charts ===
Chart (2020)	Peak position
Euro Digital Song Sales (Billboard)	10

=== Personnel ===
- Adam Lambert – vocals
- Brian May – electric guitar
- Roger Taylor – drums
- Neil Fairclough – bass guitar

== See also ==
- List of best-selling singles
