= Crazy Frog in the House =

Single by Crazy Frog

from the album Crazy Frog Presents More Crazy Hits
- B-side: "Go Froggy Go"
- Released: 5 January 2007
- Recorded: 2006
- Genre: Reggaeton, dance
- Length: 3:20
- Label: Ministry of Sound
- Songwriters: Reinhard Raith; Wolfgang Boss
- Producers: Henning Reith; Reinhard Raith; Massimo Nocito

Crazy Frog singles chronology
"Last Christmas" (2006)	"Crazy Frog in the House" (2007)	"Daddy DJ" (2009)

Music video
- "Crazy Frog in the House" on YouTube

"Crazy Frog in the House" is a song by Crazy Frog, released as the second single from the album Crazy Frog Presents More Crazy Hits. This song is an interpolation of "Chacarron Macarron" and the Knight Rider theme. The single was released in Europe on 5 January 2007, and the music video is featured on the Crazy Frog Presents Crazy Video Hits DVD.

The video was shot in the streets of Montreal, Canada, and unlike other Crazy Frog videos (which are computer-animated) incorporates live action footage as the CGI-rendered Frog interacts with people on the street, ultimately leading a group of choreographed children in several different types of dances.

"Crazy Frog in the House" has much less success than Crazy Frog's previous hits singles. It reached #12, its highest position on all charts, in France, in its third week, on 23 December 2006, and stayed in top 100 for 26 weeks. It also peaked at #19 in Switzerland on 4 February 2007, and featured on the chart for ten weeks. It hit #17 for two weeks in Austria, and stayed on the chart for nine weeks. It was a moderate hit in Belgium (Wallonia) and Germany, where it was only a top 25 hit.

== Music video ==
The music video starts with 2 boys kicking a soccer ball. Then the boy with the white baseball cap catches the ball. The two boys then would see a white Lincoln Town Car driving by them. The car then stops. The man with a white suit takes a tumble in the back seat. The man with the black officer hat then sees the Frog on the road. Then, Crazy Frog zooms away from the vehicle. Crazy Frog then arrives at a corner store trying to catch a fly. Crazy Frog then sees a gumball machine with gumballs inside it. The frog then shakes the gumball machine and the gumball machine makes some noises while the children were blowing bubbles. Crazy Frog then meets a stranger as he is trying to get past him. The man with the white suit then runs up to the children and Crazy Frog as they were on top of a building trying to do dances. The man with the white suit then blows a whistle to call for photographers and a van. Some strangers were doing some dances as well. At the end, the man with the white suit slaps the officer in the back to go away.

== Track listings ==
1. "Crazy Frog in the House" (radio edit) — 2:57
2. "Crazy Frog in the House" (club mix) — 4:18
3. "Crazy Frog in the House" (club mix instrumental)
4. "Go Froggy Go"
5. "Crazy Frog in the House" (video)

== Charts ==
=== Weekly charts ===
Chart (2006–2007)	Peak position
Austria (Ö3 Austria Top 40)	17
Belgium (Ultratop 50 Flanders)	38
Belgium (Ultratop 50 Wallonia)	24
France (SNEP)	12
Germany (GfK)	22
Switzerland (Schweizer Hitparade)	19

=== Year-end charts ===
Chart (2007)	Position
Belgium (Ultratop Wallonia)	93
