= Crazy Hits =

Studio album by Crazy Frog
- Released: 25 July 2005
- Recorded: 2005
- Genres: Eurodance; novelty
- Length: 53:17 (UK)
- Labels: Mach 1; Warner; Next Plateau/Universal

Crazy Frog chronology
Crazy Hits (2005)	Crazy Frog Presents More Crazy Hits (2006)

Singles from Crazy Frog Presents Crazy Hits
- 1. "Axel F" Released: May 17, 2005; 2. "Popcorn" Released: August 8, 2005; 3. "Jingle Bells/U Can't Touch This" Released: November 28, 2005

Professional ratings
Review scores
Source	Rating
AllMusic	2/5 stars
Entertainment Weekly	D

Crazy Hits is the debut studio album by the Crazy Frog, released on 25 July 2005. It is a collection of songs mixed with the Crazy Frog ringtone, including the remix of the song "Axel F" which appeared in the 1984 film Beverly Hills Cop and "Popcorn".

The Crazy Christmas Edition of the album was released on November 25 with an alternate cover and several holiday-themed bonus tracks. This edition charted in the UK at #75. There was also a similar release titled Crazy Winter Hits 2006 with a selection of rarities and remixes, released only in Russia and Ukraine.

== Reception ==
It debuted at number one on the New Zealand Top 40 Album Chart, and reached number five on the UK Albums Chart, number 18 in Australia, and number 19 on the U.S. Billboard 200 Albums Chart.

== Track listing ==
UK release
No.	Title	Writer(s)	Original artist	Length
1.	"Intro"	Henning Reith; Andreas Litterscheid; Reinhard Raith; Wolfgang Boss	Original song	1:02
2.	"Axel F"	Harold Faltermeyer	Harold Faltermeyer	2:54
3.	"Popcorn"	Gershon Kingsley	Gershon Kingsley	3:12
4.	"Whoomp! (There It Is)"	Stephen Gibson; Cecil Glenn	Tag Team	2:55
5.	"1001 Nights"	Litterscheid; Reith; Raith	Original song	2:55
6.	"Bailando"	Luc Rigaux; Patrick Samoy; M.I. Garcia Asensio	Paradisio	3:00
7.	"Don't You Want Me"	Francis Wright; Cheri Renee Williams; Joanne Yvonne Thomas; Renee Washington; Cassio Ware; Derek A. Jenkins; Dwayne "Spen" Richardson; Paul Scott	Felix	2:57
8.	"Dirty Frog"			3:35
9.	"Magic Melody"	Floris Klinkert		3:15
10.	"Pump Up the Jam"	Manuela Kamosi; Thomas de Quincey; Farley "Jackmaster" Funk	Technotronic	3:09
11.	"In The 80's"	Reith; Litterscheid; Raith; Boss	Original song	3:32
12.	"Pinocchio"	Fiorenzo Carpi	Fiorenzo Carpi	2:58
13.	"Wonderland"			3:31
14.	"Dallas (Theme)"	Jerrold Immel	Jerrold Immel	3:15
15.	"The Pink Panther"	Henry Mancini	Henry Mancini	2:35
19.	"Crazy Sounds (Acapella)"	Reith; Litterscheid; Raith; Boss	Original song	3:08
20.	"Axel F (video)"	Faltermeyer	Harold Faltermeyer
21.	"Popcorn (video)"	Kingsley	Gershon Kingsley
22.	"Enhanced Section (with screensaver, wallpaper, photos and game)"

US release
No.	Title	Writer(s)	Original artist	Length
1.	"Intro"	Reith; Litterscheid; Raith; Boss	Original song	1:02
2.	"Axel F"	Faltermeyer	Harold Faltermeyer	2:54
3.	"Popcorn"	Kingsley	Gershon Kingsley	3:12
4.	"Whoomp! (There It Is)"	Gibson; Glenn	Tag Team	2:55
5.	"We Like to Party"	Danski; DJ Delmundo	Vengaboys	3:27
6.	"Pump Up the Jam"	Kamosi; de Quincey; Funk	Technotronic	3:09
7.	"In The 80's"	Reith; Litterscheid; Raith; Boss	Original song	3:32
8.	"Get Ready for This"	Phil Wilde; Jean-Paul de Coster; Ray Slijngaard	2 Unlimited	3:05
9.	"Who Let the Frog Out?"	Anslem Douglas	Anslem Douglas	2:58
10.	"I Like to Move It"	Erick Morillo; Mark Quashie	Reel 2 Real feat. the Mad Stuntman	2:59
11.	"Crazy Sounds (Acapella)"	Reith; Litterscheid; Raith; Boss	Original song	3:08
12.	"Hip Hop Hooray"
13.	"Axel F (video)"	Faltermeyer	Harold Faltermeyer

Australian release
No.	Title	Writer(s)	Original artist	Length
1.	"Intro"	Reith; Litterscheid; Raith; Boss	Original song	1:02
2.	"Axel F"	Faltermeyer	Harold Faltermeyer	2:54
3.	"Popcorn"	Kingsley	Gershon Kingsley	3:12
4.	"Whoomp! (There It Is)"	Gibson; Glenn	Tag Team	2:55
5.	"1001 Nights"	Litterscheid; Reith; Raith	Original song	2:55
6.	"We Like to Party"	Danski; DJ Delmundo	Vengaboys	3:27
7.	"Don't You Want Me"	Wright; Williams; Thomas; Washington; Ware; Jenkins; Richardson; Scott	Felix	2:57
8.	"Dirty Frog"			3:35
9.	"Magic Melody"	Klinkert		3:15
10.	"Pump Up the Jam"	Kamosi; de Quincey; Funk	Technotronic	3:09
11.	"In The 80's"	Reith; Litterscheid; Raith; Boss	Original song	3:32
12.	"Who Let the Frog Out?"	Douglas	Anslem Douglas	2:58
13.	"Wonderland"			3:31
14.	"Dallas (Theme)"	Immel	Jerrold Immel	3:15
15.	"Get Ready for This"	Wilde; de Coster; Slijngaard	2 Unlimited	3:05
16.	"I Like to Move It"	Morillo; Quashie	Reel 2 Real feat. the Mad Stuntman	2:59
17.	"Crazy Sounds (Acapella)"	Reith; Litterscheid; Raith; Boss	Original song	3:08
18.	"Axel F (video)"	Faltermeyer	Harold Faltermeyer
19.	"Popcorn (video)"	Kingsley	Gershon Kingsley
20.	"Whoomp! (There It Is) (video)"	Gibson; Glenn	Tag Team
21.	"Enhanced Section (with screensaver, wallpaper, photos and game)"

Crazy Christmas Edition
No.	Title	Writer(s)	Original artist	Length
1.	"Intro"	Reith; Litterscheid; Raith; Boss	Original song	1:02
2.	"Jingle Bells"	James Lord Pierpont	Traditional	2:37
3.	"Last Christmas"	George Michael	Wham!	4:27
4.	"U Can't Touch This"	Stanley Burrell; James Johnson; Alonzo Miller	MC Hammer	3:17
5.	"Axel F"	Faltermeyer	Harold Faltermeyer	2:54
6.	"Popcorn"	Kingsley	Gershon Kingsley	3:12
7.	"Whoomp! (There It Is)"	Gibson; Glenn	Tag Team	2:55
8.	"1001 Nights"	Litterscheid; Reith; Raith	Original song	2:55
9.	"We Like To Party"	Danski; DJ Delmundo	Vengaboys	3:27
10.	"Don't You Want Me"	Wright; Williams; Thomas; Washington; Ware; Jenkins; Richardson; Scott	Felix	2:57
11.	"Dirty Frog"			3:35
12.	"Magic Melody"	Klinkert		3:15
13.	"Pump Up The Jam"	Kamosi; de Quincey; Funk	Technotronic	3:09
14.	"In The 80's"	Reith; Litterscheid; Raith; Boss	Original song	3:32
15.	"Who Let The Frog Out"	Douglas	Anslem Douglas	2:58
16.	"Wonderland"			3:31
17.	"Dallas (Theme)"	Immel	Jerrold Immel	3:15
18.	"The Pink Panther"	Mancini	Henry Mancini	2:35
19.	"Get Ready For This"	Wilde; de Coster; Slijngaard	2 Unlimited	3:05
20.	"I Like To Move It"	Morillo; Quashie	Reel 2 Real feat. the Mad Stuntman	2:59
21.	"Crazy Sounds (Acapella)"	Reith; Litterscheid; Raith; Boss	Original song	3:08
22.	"Axel F (video)"	Faltermeyer	Harold Faltermeyer
23.	"Popcorn (video)"	Kingsley	Gershon Kingsley
24.	"Enhanced Section (with screensaver, wallpaper and photos)"
25.	"Ding Ding a Boom Boom"		Original song

The Crazy Winter Hits 2006
No.	Title	Writer(s)	Original artist	Length
1.	"Jingle Bells" (Single Mix)	Pierpont	Traditional	2:37
2.	"Chernie Glaza"		Aidamir Mugu
3.	"U Can't Touch This" (Radio Mix)	Burrell; Johnson; Miller	MC Hammer	3:17
4.	"Get Ready For This"	Wilde; de Coster; Slijngaard	2 Unlimited	3:05
5.	"Popcorn" (Radio Mix)	Kingsley	Gershon Kingsley	2:46
6.	"Who Let The Frog Out?"	Douglas	Anslem Douglas	2:58
7.	"Last Christmas"	Michael	Wham!	4:27
8.	"Axel F" (Club Mix)	Faltermeyer	Harold Faltermeyer
9.	"Popcorn" (Potatoheadz Mix)	Kingsley	Gershon Kingsley
10.	"We Like To Party" (Hands Up Mix)	Danski; DJ Delmundo	Vengaboys
11.	"Axel F" (Bounce Mix)	Faltermeyer	Harold Faltermeyer
12.	"I Like to Move It" (Club Mix)	Morillo; Quashie	Reel 2 Real feat. the Mad Stuntman
13.	"Jingle Bells" (New Club Mix)	Pierpont	Traditional
14.	"Crazy Toy Song"		Original song

== Charts ==
=== Weekly charts ===
Chart (2005)	Peak position
Australian Albums (ARIA)	22
Australian Dance Albums (ARIA)	1
Austrian Albums (Ö3 Austria)	2
Belgian Albums (Ultratop Flanders)	2
Belgian Albums (Ultratop Wallonia)	2
Canadian Albums (Billboard)	4
Danish Albums (Hitlisten)	2
Dutch Albums (Album Top 100)	72
Finnish Albums (Suomen virallinen lista)	1
French Albums (SNEP)	4
German Albums (Offizielle Top 100)	6
Hungarian Albums (MAHASZ)	12
Irish Albums (IRMA)	13
Italian Albums (FIMI)	7
New Zealand Albums (RMNZ)	1
Norwegian Albums (VG-lista)	16
Polish Albums (ZPAV)	1
Portuguese Albums (AFP)	2
Swedish Albums (Sverigetopplistan)	6
Swiss Albums (Schweizer Hitparade)	4
UK Albums (Official Charts)	5
US Billboard 200	19

=== Year-end charts ===
Chart (2005)	Position
Australian Albums (ARIA)	94
Australian Dance Albums (ARIA)	12
Austrian Albums (Ö3 Austria)	50
Belgian Albums (Ultratop Flanders)	22
Belgian Albums (Ultratop Wallonia)	12
Danish Albums (Hitlisten)	9
European Albums (Billboard)	21
Finnish Albums (Suomen viralinen lista)	4
French Albums (SNEP)	46
German Albums (Offizielle Top 100)	69
Hungarian Albums (MAHASZ)	73
New Zealand Albums (RMNZ)	10
Swedish Albums (Sverigetopplistan)	33
Swedish Albums & Compilations (Sverigetopplistan)	37
Swiss Albums (Schweizer Hitparade)	55
UK Albums (OCC)	151

== Certifications and sales ==
Region	Certification	Certified units/sales
Australia (ARIA)	Gold	35,000^{^}
Belgium (BRMA)	Gold	25,000^{*}
Canada (Music Canada)	2× Platinum	200,000^{^}
Czech Republic	—	21,426
Denmark (IFPI Danmark)	Platinum	40,000^{^}
Finland (Musiikkituottajat)	Platinum	31,414
France (SNEP)	Gold	100,000^{*}
New Zealand (RMNZ)	3× Platinum	45,000^{^}
Poland (ZPAV) Platinium Collection Edition	2× Platinum	80,000^{*}
Portugal (AFP)	2× Platinum	40,000^{^}
Russia (NFPF)	Diamond	200,000^{*}
Sweden (GLF)	Platinum	60,000^{^}
Switzerland (IFPI Switzerland)	Gold	20,000^{^}
United Kingdom (BPI)	Gold	100,000^{^}
^{*} Sales figures based on certification alone.^{^} Shipments figures based on certification alone.
