= Crazy Frog Racer 2 =

2006 video game

- Developer: Neko Entertainment
- Publishers: Valcon Games; Turtle Games
- Platforms: PlayStation 2, Microsoft Windows
- Release: EU: Late 2006; NA: September 4, 2007
- Genre: Racing
- Modes: Single-player, multiplayer

Crazy Frog Racer 2 (known as Crazy Frog: Arcade Racer in America and Asia) is a 2006 racing game developed by Neko Entertainment and the sequel to the 2005 racing game Crazy Frog Racer. It was published by Valcon Games in the United States and Turtle Games in the United Kingdom.

This game includes traditional race mode (locations ranging from the snow to the city), a pinball style game and a jukebox to watch videos like Crazy Frog's Popcorn and the original songs.

== Reception ==
Reception

Aggregate score
Aggregator	Score
Metacritic	29/100

Review score
Publication	Score
IGN	2.5/10

Metacritic, a review aggregator, rated the PlayStation 2 version 29/100 based on five reviews. Sam Bishop of IGN rated it 2.5/10 and wrote, "Despite not looking like the ocular abortion that one would expect, I still wouldn't even wish it upon my worst enemy."
