= Ring Ding Ding =

Single by Pondlife
- Released: 6 June 2005
- Recorded: 2005
- Genre: House
- Length: 2:16
- Label: Tug
- Songwriters: Daryl Denham, Maurice Cheetham
- Producers: Daryl Denham, Maurice Cheetham, Trevor Jordan, Wes Butters

Music video
- "Ring Ding Ding" on YouTube

"Ring Ding Ding" is a 2005 house music recording by Pondlife, a collective of British DJs including Wes Butters and Daryl Denham. The recording samples the Crazy Frog ringtone owned by Jamster, and was first made by Butters and played on his BBC Radio 1 show in early 2005. Its release was delayed due to legal challenges by Jamster, during which the company put out the official single "Axel F". "Ring Ding Ding" peaked at number 11 on the UK singles chart for the week ending 18 June 2005, and was number 163 for the biggest-selling singles in the UK in 2005.

== Background ==
Wes Butters presented The Official Chart on BBC Radio 1 from 2003 to February 2005. After hearing the Crazy Frog on a Jamster advertisement in December 2004, he decided to put a beat behind it. Against the wishes of his producer, Butters played the track for the first time at 4:30 a.m. and received what he described as "the biggest response for that time in the morning", including two record labels. Chris Moyles played the track on his Radio 1 breakfast show, increasing its audience.

In February 2005, it was announced that Butters's track would be released as a single. Its release was scheduled for 4 April as "Crazy Frog Chorus". Copyright issues with Jamster initially impeded "Ring Ding Ding" from being released as a single, until Butters released a remix "with a slightly different frog to beat the copyright problems". The company released a version of "Axel F" as the Crazy Frog's official single. The official song was released on 23 May 2005, with "Ring Ding Ding" following two weeks later on 6 June.

== Reception ==
Music News gave the recording two stars out of five, calling it "a hard house dirty banging dance tune complete with hilarious burps and Crazy's familiar croakal delivery". Butters said that reaction had been polarised, and alleged that an Australian had offered a reward for his murder. Music critic James Masterton rated "Ring Ding Ding" as superior to "Axel F", judging that the official single had "a few noises added over the top" of an old song, and that Pondlife's single had transformed the ringtone into something that "moves beyond irritating to become something that is actually worth listening to".
