= Popcorn (instrumental) =

1969 song by Gershon Kingsley

- Cover of 1972 release of "Pop Corn"

Song by Gershon Kingsley

from the album Music to Moog By
- Released: 1969
- Genre: Synth-pop
- Length: 2:24
- Label: Audio Fidelity
- Songwriter: Gershon Kingsley

"Popcorn" (originally titled "Pop Corn") is an instrumental song composed by Gershon Kingsley in 1969 for the album Music to Moog By. It was performed on the Moog synthesizer and released on the Audio Fidelity label. The name is a combination of pop for pop music and corn for kitsch. The song became a worldwide hit in 1972, when it was covered by Hot Butter, an American pop band. Since then, multiple versions of the piece have been produced and released, including those by Anarchic System, Omar Khorshid, The Boomtang Boys, Popcorn Makers, Vyacheslav Mescherin, M & H Band, Aphex Twin, Crazy Frog, the Muppets, and Marsheaux.

== Hot Butter version ==
"Popcorn"

Single by Hot Butter

from the album Popcorn
- B-side: "At the Movies"
- Released: July 1972 (U.S.)
- Genre: Synth-pop; proto-disco; electronic
- Length: 2:30
- Label: Interfusion (AUS); Musicor (US and Canada)
- Songwriter: Gershon Kingsley
- Producers: Bill Jerome; Steve Jerome

Hot Butter singles chronology
"Popcorn" (1972)	"Skokiaan" (1973)

Audio sample
- file; help

In 1972, a rearranged version of the instrumental was recorded by Kingsley's First Moog Quartet. This was intended for the namesake album (First Moog Quartet) which was a re-release of the 1970 First Moog Quartet album with the same name. The 1972 version of the instrumental had the current title "Popcorn". In the same year, Stan Free, a fellow member of the First Moog Quartet, re-recorded another instrumental, based on the 1972 version, with his own band Hot Butter. This was released as a single and became a hit in mainland Europe, spending several weeks at No. 1 in several countries on the continent, including France (4 weeks at the top) and Switzerland (10 weeks), ultimately becoming the biggest-selling single of 1972 in both countries. "Popcorn" was also a No. 1 hit in Germany (3 weeks), the Netherlands (7 weeks), and Norway (9 weeks).

Record World said that the "catchy tune played out in intricate synthesizer counterpoint expands on a musical idea first brought out in the popular percolater [sic] commercials on TV."

=== Track listing ===
7-inch single

1. "Popcorn" – 2:30
2. "At the Movies" – 2:31

=== Charts ===
==== Weekly charts ====
Chart (1972–1973)	Peak position
Australia (Go-Set National Top 40)	1
Australia (Kent Music Report)	1
Austria (Ö3 Austria Top 40)	10
Canada Adult Contemporary (RPM)	2
Canada Top Singles (RPM)	15
France (IFOP)	1
Germany (GfK)	1
Ireland (IRMA)	8
Netherlands (Dutch Top 40)	1
Netherlands (Single Top 100)	12
New Zealand (Listener)	3
Norway (VG-lista)	1
South Africa (Springbok Radio)	13
Spain (AFYVE)	13
Switzerland (Schweizer Hitparade)	1
UK Singles (Official Charts)	5
US Billboard Hot 100	9
US Billboard Easy Listening	4
US Cash Box	11
US Record World	7

==== Year-end charts ====
Chart (1972)	Position
Australia (Kent Music Report)	3
France (IFOP)	1
Netherlands (Dutch Top 40)	5
Switzerland (Schweizer Hitparade)	1
US Billboard Hot 100	28
US Cash Box	70

=== Sales ===
Sales for "Popcorn"
Region	Sales
France	1,400,000
Europe	2,500,000

== Crazy Frog version ==
"Popcorn"

Single by Crazy Frog

from the album Crazy Frog Presents Crazy Hits
- B-side: "Who Let the Frog Out?"
- Released: August 8, 2005
- Recorded: 2005
- Genre: Eurodance
- Length: 3:12 (album version); 2:46 (radio edit)
- Label: Ministry of Sound
- Songwriter: Gershon Kingsley
- Producer: Erik Wernquist

Crazy Frog singles chronology
"Axel F" (2005)	"Popcorn" (2005)	"Jingle Bells" / "U Can't Touch This" (2005)

Music video
- "Popcorn" on YouTube

In 2005, Crazy Frog released a cover of "Popcorn", the remix of which was arranged by Jamba!, and also marketed as a ringtone. The song differs from Crazy Frog's debut release "Axel F" in that it does not contain the trademark "Crazy Frog sound" by Daniel Malmedahl.

In France, "Popcorn" replaced Crazy Frog's previous single "Axel F" at No. 1 on 24 September 2005, and the track remained at the top spot for seven weeks, with its best weekly sales of 71,777 copies during its second week. Certified diamond status just three months after its release by the SNEP, as of August 2014, this version of "Popcorn" is the 40th-best-selling single of the 21st century in France, with 458,000 copies sold. The track also topped the charts in New Zealand, Spain and Wallonia.

The animated music video was produced by Kaktus Film and Erik Wernquist of TurboForce3D and features Crazy Frog causing chaos at the undersea labs of the drones. A significantly shortened version of this video was also used for the Frog's version of "U Can't Touch This".

=== Track listings ===
UK

1. "Popcorn" (radio mix)
2. "Popcorn" (radio mix instrumental)
3. "Popcorn" (potatoheadz mix)
4. "Popcorn" (radikal mix)
5. "Popcorn" (resource mix)
6. "Popcorn" (video)

Australia

1. "Popcorn" (radio mix)
2. "Popcorn" (potatoheadz mix)
3. "Popcorn" (resource mix)
4. "Who Let the Frog Out?"

=== Charts ===
==== Weekly charts ====
Chart (2005–2006)	Peak position
Australia (ARIA)	11
Australian Dance (ARIA)	1
Austria (Ö3 Austria Top 40)	19
Belgium (Ultratop 50 Flanders)	11
Belgium (Ultratop 50 Wallonia)	1
CIS Airplay (TopHit)	64
Denmark (Tracklisten)	9
Europe (Eurochart Hot 100)	4
Finland (Suomen virallinen lista)	12
France (SNEP)	1
Germany (GfK)	35
Greece (IFPI)	12
Hungary (Dance Top 40)	37
Ireland (IRMA)	14
Netherlands (Single Top 100)	39
New Zealand (Recorded Music NZ)	1
Norway (VG-lista)	12
Russia Airplay (TopHit)	60
Scottish Singles Sales (Official Charts)	10
Spain (Promusicae)	1
Sweden (Sverigetopplistan)	9
Switzerland (Schweizer Hitparade)	6
Ukraine Airplay (TopHit)	22
UK Singles (Official Charts)	12
UK Indie (Official Charts)	4

==== Year-end charts ====
Chart (2005)	Position
Australia (ARIA)	79
Australian Dance (ARIA)	8
Belgium (Ultratop 50 Flanders)	86
Belgium (Ultratop 50 Wallonia)	23
Europe (Eurochart Hot 100)	16
France (SNEP)	6
France Club Chart (SNEP)	49
France Digital (SNEP)	16
New Zealand (RIANZ)	4
Sweden (Hitlistan)	51
Ukraine Airplay (TopHit)	136

Chart (2006)	Position
Switzerland (Schweizer Hitparade)	85

=== Certifications ===
Region	Certification	Certified units/sales
Australia (ARIA)	Gold	35,000^{^}
France (SNEP)	Diamond	471,816
New Zealand (RMNZ)	Platinum	10,000^{*}
^{*} Sales figures based on certification alone.^{^} Shipments figures based on certification alone.

== Legacy and influence ==
French electronic composer and musician Jean-Michel Jarre recorded a 1972 version under the pseudonyms Pop Corn Orchestra and Jammie Jefferson. Later he was inspired by this song to compose his 1976 biggest hit "Oxygène (Part IV)". In early 2019, when Kingsley died, the experimental composer Blanck Mass chose "Popcorn" as one of the 10 most influential compositions of his career.

== Other versions ==
The 1972 cover by the Popcorn Makers reached No. 7 on the German charts and No. 1 on the Dutch Charts. The version with vocals by French band Anarchic System was released in 1972 and reached at No. 13 on the German charts, No. 10 on the Dutch charts and No. 1 on the Ultratop 50.

In 1987, the French M & H Band (sole member Mark Haliday), released a version of "Popcorn" which peaked at No. 8 on the Norwegian charts and at No. 20 on the Swedish charts. This single's release was accompanied by the first purpose-produced music video. Aphex Twin, under the alias Caustic Window, included a techno cover of "Popcorn" on the Joyrex J4 EP in 1992. Canadian group the Boomtang Boys covered "Popcorn" in 1999, their version peaked at No. 26 on the Billboard Dance Club Songs chart, where it stayed for 9 weeks. It also reached No. 10 on RPM's Canadian dance chart. Richárd Moldován known as Richi M released in the 2000 year a cover version which reached at No. 9 on the Swedish charts.

== In popular culture ==
In a comical reference, a version of the song was included in the 2010 skit by The Muppets called "Pöpcørn: Recipes with The Swedish Chef." In 2022, Swedish singer Tove Lo sampled the Hot Butter version in her single "2 Die 4".

The melody has also been used as the background theme music in the 1983 video game Digger.

== See also ==
- List of Dutch Top 40 number-one singles of 1972
- List of number-one hits of 1972 (Germany)
- List of number-one singles from 1968 to 1979 (Switzerland)
- List of number-one singles from the 2000s (New Zealand)
- List of number-one singles in Australia during the 1970s
- List of number-one singles of 1972 (France)
- List of number-one singles of 2005 (France)
- List of number-one singles of 2005 (Spain)
- List of Ultratop 40 number-one singles of 2005
