= Crazy Frog =

Swedish CGI-animated character

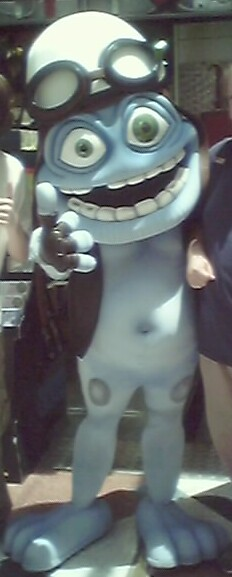
- Crazy Frog at its Australian tour in 2005

Background information
- Also known as: The Annoying Thing
- Origin: Gothenburg, Sweden
- Genre: Eurodance
- Years active: 2003–2009; 2020–present
- Labels: Ministry of Sound; Mach 1 GmbH; Universal; Warner
- Website: crazyfrog.tv

Crazy Frog (originally known as The Annoying Thing) is a Swedish CGI-animated character and Eurodance musician created in 2003 by actor and playwright Erik Wernquist. Marketed by the ringtone provider Jamba!, the character was originally created to accompany a sound effect produced by Daniel Malmedahl while attempting to imitate the sound of a two-stroke engine.

The Crazy Frog spawned a worldwide hit single with a cover version of the Beverly Hills Cop theme tune "Axel F", which reached the number one spot in Turkey, New Zealand, Australia and most of Europe. The subsequent album Crazy Frog Presents Crazy Hits and second single "Popcorn" also enjoyed worldwide chart success, and a second album entitled Crazy Frog Presents More Crazy Hits was released in 2006, as well as a third album, Everybody Dance Now, released in 2009. The Crazy Frog also spawned many singles, a range of merchandise and toys, as well as two video games before going on hiatus in 2009.

On 22 April 2020, a Twitter account for the character was created, and the account is listed on the official website, Facebook profile and YouTube channel. A new album was announced later that same day. On 10 December 2021, a new single, "Tricky", was released after a 12-year hiatus.

== History ==
In 1997, 17-year-old Gothenburg student Daniel Malmedahl recorded himself imitating the noises produced by a two-stroke engine. He posted this on a website and caught the attention of a Swedish television researcher, who convinced Daniel to perform the sound live on air. After it debuted on television, recordings of his performance began appearing on file sharing networks and various websites under the filename "2TAKTARE.MP3" ("Tvåtaktare" is Swedish for "two-stroker").

The sound was adopted as the sound of a Formula One car as early as 2001 in the form of "Deng Deng Form" and later "The Insanity Test", both of which were a static background of a Ferrari Formula One car accompanied by the sound.

In late 2003, another Swede, Erik Wernquist, encountered the sound effect and, not knowing about the previous incarnations of the sound, was inspired to create the 3D animated character he named "The Annoying Thing" to accompany it. Wernquist worked on the first animation in his spare time using the LightWave 3D modeling application, and the whole process took between six and eight weeks. On 7 October 2003 he posted it on his website and on the CGTalk forum.

The animation was a popular attraction at Wernquist's website, but the sound was credited to "Anonymous". Eventually, word reached Malmedahl that his impressions had been used in a now well-known animation studio. He contacted Wernquist, apparently giving an impromptu performance to confirm his claims. Wernquist was convinced, and gave credit to Malmedahl for his creation.

The animation received attention through filesharing and word of mouth. Ringtone Europe and Jamster België (now both merged into Jamba!) licensed the rights to the creation in an attempt to capitalize on its popularity. They renamed it "Crazy Frog" and began to market it in mid-2004.

In an interview with HitQuarters, Wernquist expressed his displeasure at the choice of name:

If I had known that this was going to be such a big thing I would not have allowed them to use that stupid name. It has nothing to do with the character. It's not a frog and it's not particularly crazy either.

Following 2009, the character went on hiatus. In 2018, a trademark claim by Kaktus Films, the original owners alongside Erik Wernquist, had music listed as one of many rights. On 22 April 2020, an official Twitter account for the character was created, and later that day it was announced that a new album was in development.

In April 2022, the Government of Ukraine uploaded a video on Facebook of Russian tanks being hit by Ukrainian strikes during the Russian invasion of Ukraine with Crazy Frog's cover of "Axel F" playing in the background.

== Other media ==
On 1 July 2005, UK-based publishers Digital Jesters announced that they had acquired the rights to the video game license for Crazy Frog. Crazy Frog Racer (featuring the Annoying Thing) was released on December 2005 on PlayStation 2 and PC as a racing game. A year later in 2006 a sequel was released, titled Crazy Frog Racer 2.

A string of Crazy Frog merchandise was released in the UK.

In 2005, the German production company The League of Good People was in talks with broadcasters about a TV series based on Crazy Frog.

Crazy Frog toured Australia in late 2005, beginning in Perth on 4 December and continuing through other major capital cities. He made appearances at numerous shopping centres and major hospitals around the country.

In 2007, the Animation World Network wrote in connection with The Annoying Thing that there was a "planned feature film" to "be completed by the end of next year" into an animated feature film.

In 2017, a documentary called The Not So Crazy Frog was released, originally made in 2012.

== Discography ==
The Crazy Frog was broadcast for the first time on Belgian television in mid-2004, though it was named the Annoying Thing. There it was marketed as Albert Motàr.

"Axel F" (a remix of the 1980s Harold Faltermeyer song produced by the German band Resource) was released on 23 May 2005 and became one of the most successful singles of the year. The single debuted at number one in the UK, remaining there for four weeks, and it was released on the debut album Crazy Frog Presents Crazy Hits.

=== Albums ===
List of studio albums, with selected chart positions and certifications
Title	Album details	Peak chart positions										Certifications
Title	Album details	SWE	AUS	CAN	FRA	GER	IRL	NZ	SWI	UK	US	Certifications
Crazy Hits	Released: 25 July 2005; Label: Ministry of Sound; Format: CD, digital download	6	22	4	4	6	13	1	4	5	19	GLF: Platinum; ARIA: Gold; BPI: Gold; IFPI SWI: Gold; MC: 2× Platinum; RMNZ: 3× Platinum; SNEP: Gold
More Crazy Hits	Released: 26 June 2006; Label: Ministry of Sound; Format: CD, digital download	19	38	1	8	17	—	20	14	64	40	RMNZ: Gold; SNEP: Gold
Everybody Dance Now	Released: 25 August 2009; Labels: Ministry of Sound, Mach 1 Records GmbH, Universal Music Group	—	—	35	23	—	—	—	—	—	—	
"—" denotes a recording that did not chart or was not released in that territory.

=== Singles ===
List of singles, with selected chart positions and certifications, showing year released and album name
Title	Year	Peak chart positions										Certifications	Album
Title	Year	SWE	AUS	BEL	FRA	GER	IRE	NZ	SWI	UK	US	Certifications	Album
"Axel F"	2005	1	1	1	1	3	1	1	1	1	50	GLF: Platinum; ARIA: 2× Platinum; BEA: 2× Platinum; BPI: Platinum; IFPI SWI: Platinum; RIAA: 2× Platinum; RMNZ: 2× Platinum; SNEP: Diamond	Crazy Hits
"Popcorn"	2005	9	11	1	1	35	14	1	6	12	—	ARIA: Gold; RMNZ: Platinum; SNEP: Diamond	Crazy Hits
"Jingle Bells"^{[A]}	2005	10	4	2	5	—	11	1	—	5	—	ARIA: Gold; RMNZ: Gold	Crazy Hits
"We Are the Champions (Ding a Dang Dong)"	2006	11	13	2	1	10	23	20	5	11	—	BEA: Gold; SNEP: Gold	More Crazy Hits
"Last Christmas"^{[A]}	2006	10	30	6	19	—	16	19	—	16	—		More Crazy Hits
"Crazy Frog in the House"	2007	—	—	24	12	22	—	—	19	—	—		More Crazy Hits
"Daddy DJ"	2009	—	—	—	4	—	—	—	—	—	—		Everybody Dance Now
"Cha Cha Slide"	2009	—	—	—	18	—	—	—	—	—	—		Everybody Dance Now
"Tricky"	2021	—	—	—	—	—	—	—	—	—	—		Non-album singles
"A Ring Ding Ding Ding"	2022	—	—	—	—	—	—	—	—	—	—		Non-album singles
"Funny Song"	2023	—	—	—	—	—	—	—	—	—	—		Non-album singles
"Hands Up (Explode)"	2024	—	—	—	—	—	—	—	—	—	—		Non-album singles
"Crazy Saxobeat"	2026	—	—	—	—	—	—	—	—	—	—		Non-album singles
"—" denotes a recording that did not chart or was not released in that territory.

== Controversies ==
In February 2005, viewers submitted a number of complaints to the United Kingdom's Advertising Standards Authority (ASA) regarding Jamster's advertising campaign, complaining that Crazy Frog appeared to have a visible penis and scrotum. Some parents claimed that it was inappropriate for children. There were also complaints regarding the frequency with which the advertisement appeared on television, reportedly up to twice an hour across most of the day, with some channels showing it more than once per commercial break. The ASA did not uphold the complaints, pointing out that the advert was already classified as inappropriate for airing during children's television programmes as it contained a premium-rate telephone number, and that it was the broadcasters' decision how often an advertisement should be shown. Jamster did voluntarily censor the character's genital area in later broadcasts of its advertisements. Similar action occurred in Australia, with similar results.

In April 2005, UK television viewers complained about misleading advertisements produced by Jamba!, trading as Jamster and RingtoneKing. Viewers felt that it was not made sufficiently clear that they were subscribing to a service, rather than paying a one-time fee for their ringtone. The complaints were upheld. As the authority had already adjudicated on the matter and confirmed the matter was not within its remit, the unusual step was taken of adding a notice to the ASA's online and telephone complaints system informing viewers that Jamster!-related complaints should be directed towards the broadcaster or the regulator, Ofcom. In May 2005, viewers inundated the ASA with new complaints regarding the continuous airing of the latest Crazy Frog advertisements. The intensity of the advertising was unprecedented in British television history. According to The Guardian, Jamster bought 73,716 spots across all TV channels in May alone – an average of nearly 2,378 slots daily – at a cost of about £8 million, just under half of which was spent on ITV. 87% of the population saw the Crazy Frog adverts an average of 26 times, 15% of the adverts appeared twice during the same advertising break and 66% were in consecutive ad breaks. An estimated 10% of the population saw the advert more than 60 times. This led to many members of the population finding the Crazy Frog, as its original name suggests, immensely irritating. On 21 September 2005, the ASA ruled that the Crazy Frog, along with other Jamba ringtone advertisements, could not be shown before 9pm. This adjudication was revised on 25 January 2006, maintaining the "upheld" decision but revising the wording of one of the points.

Following the release of "Tricky" on 10 December 2021, an official non-fungible token release was planned on "Metabeats". This was met with backlash on Twitter, with the account managers stating they had been receiving death threats over the matter. After the release was repeatedly postponed, all mentions of Crazy Frog were removed from the Metabeats website in late 2023, and shortly after the official Crazy Frog website removed its link to Metabeats.

== Awards and nominations ==
=== Berlin Music Video Awards ===
The Berlin Music Video Awards are an international festival that promotes the art of music videos.

Year	Nominated work	Award	Result	Ref.
2026	"Beverly Hills Cop Axel F"	Best Animation	Nominated	

== See also ==
- Giancarlo Meo
- Gummibär
- Holly Dolly
- Mickael Turtle
- "Ring Ding Ding", the unauthorised song by Pondlife sampling the Crazy Frog
- Schnappi
- Schnuffel
- René la Taupe

== Notes ==
- A In some territories, "Jingle Bells" was released as a double A-side single with a cover of MC Hammer's "U Can't Touch This", but in others, it was released as a double A-side single with "Last Christmas", which was later released as a single in its own right.
