= Axel F =

1985 single by Harold Faltermeyer

- UK and West German picture sleeve

Single by Harold Faltermeyer

from the album Beverly Hills Cop and Harold F.
- B-side: "Shoot Out"
- Released: 11 March 1985
- Recorded: 1984
- Genre: Synth-pop; electro
- Length: 3:01
- Label: MCA
- Songwriter: Harold Faltermeyer
- Producer: Harold Faltermeyer

Harold Faltermeyer singles chronology
| "Axel F" (1985) | "The Race Is On" / "Starlight Express" (1987) |

"Axel F" is an electronic instrumental track by West German musician Harold Faltermeyer. The track served as the theme tune for the film Beverly Hills Cop, its eponymous character, and the film franchise it is based on, and became an international number one hit in 1985. The single was released in 1984 by MCA Records and reached number one in Ireland as well as on the US Billboard Hot Dance Club Play chart. Additionally, it was a number-two hit in Belgium, Canada, the Netherlands, Switzerland, the United Kingdom, and West Germany.

In addition to the Beverly Hills Cop soundtrack, the track also appears on Faltermeyer's own album Harold F. as a bonus track. Its music video was directed by Faltermeyer himself.

== Production ==
Faltermeyer recorded the tune using five instruments: a Roland Jupiter-8 provided the distinctive saw lead, a Moog modular synthesizer 15 provided the bass, a Roland JX-3P provided chord stab brasses, a Yamaha DX7 was used for the marimba sound, and a LinnDrum was used for drum programming. All instruments were played by Faltermeyer.

According to Faltermeyer, the initial reaction to his first presentation of the track to the film's producers and director did not result in an immediate approval; it was not until director Martin Brest voiced his approval that the producers showed enthusiasm.

A music video was produced to promote the single, directed by Faltermeyer. Faltermeyer is featured wearing an overcoat, hat, and sunglasses; he sneaks into a computer lab at night and uses one of the machines to watch scenes from Beverly Hills Cop with himself edited in, interspersed with footage of a pole dancer, a female dancer, and of himself playing the synthesizer.

The B-Side "Shoot Out", although featuring prominently in the film, was not included on the Soundtrack album.

== Track listings ==
- 7-inch single
1. "Axel F" – 3:00
2. "Shoot Out" – 2:44
- 12-inch maxi
1. "Axel F" (M & M mix) – 7:00
2. "Axel F" (extended version) – 7:09
3. "Shoot Out" – 2:44
- 12-inch maxi
1. "Axel F" (extended version) – 7:09
2. "Shoot Out" – 2:44

== Charts ==
Faltermeyer's version of the instrumental reached number two on the UK Singles Chart and number three on the Billboard Hot 100 in the US. It also spent two weeks atop the US Adult Contemporary chart.

=== Weekly charts ===
| Chart (1985) | Peak position |
|---|---|
| Australia (Kent Music Report) | 6 |
| Austria (Ö3 Austria Top 40) | 4 |
| Belgium (Ultratop 50 Flanders) | 2 |
| Belgium (VRT Top 30 Flanders) | 2 |
| Canada Top Singles (RPM) | 2 |
| Canada Adult Contemporary (RPM) | 1 |
| Denmark (Hitlisten) | 9 |
| Ireland (IRMA) | 1 |
| Netherlands (Dutch Top 40) | 1 |
| Netherlands (Single Top 100) | 2 |
| New Zealand (Recorded Music NZ) | 5 |
| Sweden (Sverigetopplistan) | 18 |
| Switzerland (Schweizer Hitparade) | 2 |
| UK Singles (Official Charts) | 2 |
| US Billboard Hot 100 | 3 |
| US Adult Contemporary (Billboard) | 1 |
| US Hot Black Singles (Billboard) | 13 |
| West Germany (GfK) | 2 |

=== Year-end charts ===
| Chart (1985) | Position |
|---|---|
| Australia (Kent Music Report) | 53 |
| Belgium (Ultratop 50 Flanders) | 22 |
| Canada Top Singles (RPM) | 30 |
| Netherlands (Dutch Top 40) | 15 |
| Netherlands (Single Top 100) | 13 |
| Switzerland (Schweizer Hitparade) | 15 |
| US Billboard Hot 100 | 61 |
| West Germany (Media Control) | 13 |

== Certifications and sales ==
| Region | Certification | Certified units/sales |
|---|---|---|
| Canada (Music Canada) | Gold | 50,000^{^} |
| United Kingdom (BPI) | Silver | 250,000^{^} |
^{^} Shipments figures based on certification alone.

== Techno Cop version ==
"Axel F"

Single by Techno Cop

from the album The Best and More
- B-side: "Cops in Trance"
- Released: 20 June 1992
- Length: 3:01
- Label: Polydor
- Songwriter: Harold Faltermeyer
- Producers: Cool & Cool

Techno Cop singles chronology
| "Stop the Police" (1992) | "Axel F" (1992) | "The Vision" (1994) |

In 1992, German techno group Techno Cop covered the instrumental, and achieved modest success with a top 30 ranking on the German singles chart. Unlike the original, this version contains rap passages.

=== Track listings ===
- 12-inch maxi
1. "Axel F" (Outlaw mix) – 5:50
2. "Axel F" (Megaphone mix) – 5:20
3. "Cops in Trance" – 4:15
- CD maxi
1. "Axel F" (U-Boot mix) – 6:00
2. "Axel F" (radio edit) – 3:49
3. "Axel F" (Minimalistixtendid) – 4:41
4. "Beverly Kills" – 2:58

=== Charts ===
| Chart (1992) | Peak position |
|---|---|
| Germany (Media Control) | 30 |

== Clock version ==
"Axel F"

Single by Clock

from the album It's Time...
- B-side: "Keep Pushin'"
- Released: 1995
- Genre: Eurodance; hi-NRG
- Length: 3:38 (radio edit); 3:22 (radio short stab)
- Label: MCA; ZYX Music
- Songwriter: Harold Faltermeyer
- Producers: Stu Allan; Pete Pritchard

Clock singles chronology
| "Keep the Fires Burning" (1994) | "Axel F" (1995) | "Whoomph! (There It Is)" (1995) |

Music video
- "Axel F" on YouTube

British pop/dance act Clock released a successful dance cover of "Axel F" in 1995. Produced by Richard Pritchard and Stu Allan and released by MCA and ZYX Music, it was featured on their debut album, It's Time... (1995), and peaked at number five in Scotland, number seven in the UK overall, number eight in Ireland and number 37 in Sweden. On the Eurochart Hot 100, the single reached number 20 in March 1995, while in Australia, it peaked at number 42. The accompanying music video was a Box Top on British music television channel The Box in April 1995.

=== Critical reception ===
When the cover was released in 1995, James Masterton wrote in his weekly UK chart, "There is no denying the brilliance of this record, making the Harold Faltermeyer classic more of a dance hit than he could ever have dreamed as the song makes the Top 10 close on ten years since the original did the same." Alan Jones from Music Week's RM Dance Update described the song as "another energetic remake". Another RM editor, James Hamilton, declared it as an "ultra excitingly galloping 135bpm Hi-NRG" track in his weekly dance column.

=== Track listings ===
- UK CD maxi
1. "Axel F" (Radio Short Stab) – 3:22
2. "Axel F" (Primax mix) – 4:47
3. "Keep Pushin'" (Clock N-R-G mix) – 6:27
4. "Keep Pushin'" (PTP 'London' mix) – 7:46
- Sweden CD maxi
1. "Axel F" (radio edit) – 3:38
2. "Axel F" (Primax mix) – 4:44
3. "Axel F" (Ten to Two mix) – 5:40
4. "Keep Pushin'" (PTP London edit) – 4:40
5. "Clock Megamix" - 15:40

=== Charts ===
==== Weekly charts ====
| Chart (1995) | Peak position |
|---|---|
| Australia (ARIA) | 42 |
| Europe (Eurochart Hot 100) | 20 |
| Ireland (IRMA) | 8 |
| Israel (Israeli Singles Chart) | 19 |
| Netherlands (Dutch Top 40 Tipparade) | 5 |
| Netherlands (Single Top 100) | 45 |
| Scotland (OCC) | 5 |
| Sweden (Sverigetopplistan) | 37 |
| UK Singles (OCC) | 7 |
| UK Airplay (Music Week) | 28 |
| UK Club Chart (Music Week) | 28 |
| UK Pop Tip Club Chart (Music Week) | 3 |

==== Year-end charts ====
| Chart (1995) | Position |
|---|---|
| UK Singles (OCC) | 82 |
| UK Pop Tip Club Chart (Music Week) | 12 |

== Psy version ==
In 2002, South Korean singer Psy released a track titled "Champion" as part of his album 3 Mai, tapping into Seoul's enthusiasm over the 2002 FIFA World Cup. "Champion" was partially inspired by Korean street cheering during the 2002 World Cup. Paul Lester of The Guardian called "Champion" a "thrashy disco ... which heavily samples "Axel F" by Harold Faltermeyer".

== Murphy Brown vs. Captain Hollywood version ==
In 2003, Murphy Brown and Captain Hollywood released their Eurodance version of "Axel F", titled "Axel F 2003". This version was produced by Matthias Wagner and Andreas Dohmeyer of the Off-cast Project, and Bass Bumpers. It contains a vocal sample from Max Headroom ("What's going on?"), heard at the beginning and middle of the song. It reached number 18 on the official German singles chart. This version was reworked two years later into the highly successful version by Crazy Frog, which was also completed by the same team of producers.

== Crazy Frog version ==
In 2005, Crazy Frog, an animated CGI character created by ringtone provider Jamba! released a cover of "Axel F". The song, itself a re-working of the 2003 Murphy Brown/Captain Hollywood version, was created in response to a popular unauthorized song using the Crazy Frog ringtone audio. "Axel F" would become a chart topping hit across Europe and Australia in summer 2005, while achieving top 40 status in the United States.

== See also ==
- List of Hot Adult Contemporary number ones of 1985
