= List of number-one singles of 2005 (France) =

This is a list of the French SNEP Top 100 CD Singles, Top 50 Digital Singles and Top 150 albums number-ones of 2005.

== Number-one by week ==
=== Singles chart ===
Week	Issue Date	Artist	Single	Download	Title
1	January 8	Eric Prydz	"Call on Me"	No Available	No Available
2	January 15	Eric Prydz	"Call on Me"	No Available	No Available
3	January 22	Eric Prydz	"Call on Me"	No Available	No Available
4	January 29	Amel Bent	"Ma Philosophie"	No Available	No Available
5	February 5	Amel Bent	"Ma Philosophie"	No Available	No Available
6	February 12	Amel Bent	"Ma Philosophie"	No Available	No Available
7	February 19	Amel Bent	"Ma Philosophie"	No Available	No Available
8	February 26	Amel Bent	"Ma Philosophie"	No Available	No Available
9	March 5	Amel Bent	"Ma Philosophie"	No Available	No Available
10	March 12	Ilona Mitrecey	"Un Monde parfait"	No Available	No Available
11	March 19	Ilona Mitrecey	"Un Monde parfait"	No Available	No Available
12	March 26	Ilona Mitrecey	"Un Monde parfait"	No Available	No Available
13	April 2	Ilona Mitrecey	"Un Monde parfait"	No Available	No Available
14	April 9	Ilona Mitrecey	"Un Monde parfait"	No Available	No Available
15	April 16	Ilona Mitrecey	"Un Monde parfait"	No Available	No Available
16	April 23	Ilona Mitrecey	"Un Monde parfait"	No Available	No Available
17	April 30	Ilona Mitrecey	"Un Monde parfait"	No Available	No Available
18	May 7	Ilona Mitrecey	"Un Monde parfait"	No Available	No Available
19	May 14	Ilona Mitrecey	"Un Monde parfait"	No Available	No Available
20	May 21	Ilona Mitrecey	"Un Monde parfait"	No Available	No Available
21	May 28	Ilona Mitrecey	"Un Monde parfait"	No Available	No Available
22	June 4	Ilona Mitrecey	"Un Monde parfait"	No Available	No Available
23	June 11	Ilona Mitrecey	"Un Monde parfait"	No Available	No Available
24	June 18	Ilona Mitrecey	"Un Monde parfait"	Crazy Frog	Axel F
25	June 25	Crazy Frog	"Axel F"	Crazy Frog	Axel F
26	July 2	Crazy Frog	"Axel F"	Crazy Frog	Axel F
27	July 9	Crazy Frog	"Axel F"	Crazy Frog	Axel F
28	July 16	Crazy Frog	"Axel F"	James Blunt	"You're Beautiful"
29	July 23	Crazy Frog	"Axel F"	James Blunt	"You're Beautiful"
30	July 30	Crazy Frog	"Axel F"	James Blunt	"You're Beautiful"
31	August 6	Crazy Frog	"Axel F"	James Blunt	"You're Beautiful"
32	August 13	Crazy Frog	"Axel F"	James Blunt	"You're Beautiful"
33	August 20	Crazy Frog	"Axel F"	James Blunt	"You're Beautiful"
34	August 27	Crazy Frog	"Axel F"	James Blunt	"You're Beautiful"
35	September 3	Crazy Frog	"Axel F"	James Blunt	"You're Beautiful"
36	September 10	Crazy Frog	"Axel F"	DHT	"Listen to Your Heart"
37	September 17	Crazy Frog	"Axel F"	DHT	"Listen to Your Heart"
38	24 September	Crazy Frog	"Popcorn"	Raphaël	"Caravane"
39	October 1	Crazy Frog	"Popcorn"	Crazy Frog	"Popcorn"
40	October 8	Crazy Frog	"Popcorn"	Bob Sinclar	"Love Generation"
41	October 15	Crazy Frog	"Popcorn"	Robbie Williams	"Tripping"
42	October 22	Crazy Frog	"Popcorn"	Robbie Williams	"Tripping"
43	October 29	Crazy Frog	"Popcorn"	Madonna	"Hung Up"
44	November 5	Crazy Frog	"Popcorn"	Madonna	"Hung Up"
45	November 12	Madonna	"Hung Up"	Madonna	"Hung Up"
46	November 19	Madonna	"Hung Up"	Madonna	"Hung Up"
47	November 26	Madonna	"Hung Up"	Madonna	"Hung Up"
48	December 3	Madonna	"Hung Up"	Madonna	"Hung Up"
49	December 10	Star Academy 5	"Santiano"	Madonna	"Hung Up"
50	December 17	Star Academy 5	"Santiano"	Madonna	"Hung Up"
51	December 24	Johnny Hallyday	"Mon plus beau Noël"	Madonna	"Hung Up"
52	December 31	Madonna	"Hung Up"	Madonna	"Hung Up"

=== Albums chart ===
Week	Issue Date	Artist	Album
1	8 January	Kyo	300 Lésions
2	15 January	Kyo	300 Lésions
3	22 January	Kyo	300 Lésions
4	29 January	Kyo	300 Lésions
5	5 February	Maroon 5	Songs About Jane
6	12 February	Chimène Badi	Dis-moi que tu m'aimes
7	19 February	Maroon 5	Songs About Jane
8	26 February	Lynda Lemay	Un Paradis quelque part
9	5 March	Les Enfoirés	Le Train des Enfoirés
10	12 March	Les Enfoirés	Le Train des Enfoirés
11	19 March	Les Enfoirés	Le Train des Enfoirés
12	26 March	Les Enfoirés	Le Train des Enfoirés
13	2 April	Les Enfoirés	Le Train des Enfoirés
14	9 April	Mylène Farmer	Avant que l'ombre...
15	16 April	Mylène Farmer	Avant que l'ombre...
16	23 April	Grégory Lemarchal	Je deviens moi
17	30 April	Mylène Farmer	Avant que l'ombre...
18	7 May	Raphaël	Caravane
19	14 May	Raphaël	Caravane
20	21 May	System of a Down	Mezmerize
21	28 May	Gorillaz	Demon Days
22	4 June	The Black Eyed Peas	Monkey Business
23	11 June	Coldplay	X&Y
24	18 June	Coldplay	X&Y
25	25 June	Raphaël	Caravane
26	2 July	Raphaël	Caravane
27	9 July	Raphaël	Caravane
28	16 July	Raphaël	Caravane
29	23 July	Raphaël	Caravane
30	30 July	Raphaël	Caravane
31	6 August	Raphaël	Caravane
32	13 August	Raphaël	Caravane
33	20 August	Raphaël	Caravane
34	27 August	Calogero	Live 1.0
35	3 September	Calogero	Live 1.0
36	10 September	Alain Souchon	La Vie Théodore
37	17 September	Alain Souchon	La Vie Théodore
38	24 September	Noir Désir	Noir Désir en public
39	1 October	Noir Désir	Noir Désir en public
40	8 October	Julien Clerc	Double Enfance
41	15 October	Julien Clerc	Double Enfance
42	22 October	Depeche Mode	Playing The Angel
43	29 October	Bénabar	Reprise des négociations
44	5 November	Lorie	Rester la même
45	12 November	Johnny Hallyday	Ma Vérité
46	19 November	Madonna	Confessions on a Dancefloor
47	26 November	Madonna	Confessions on a Dancefloor
48	3 December	Madonna	Confessions on a Dancefloor
49	10 December	Johnny Hallyday	Ma Vérité
50	17 December	Johnny Hallyday	Ma Vérité
51	24 December	Johnny Hallyday	Ma Vérité
52	31 December	Indochine	Alice & June

== Top ten best sales ==
This is the ten best-selling singles and albums in 2005.

=== Singles ===
Pos.	Artist	Title
1	Ilona Mitrecey	"Un Monde parfait"
2	Crazy Frog	"Axel F"
3	Amel Bent	"Ma Philosophie"
4	Pinocchio	"T'es pas cap Pinocchio"
5	Dezil'	"San ou (La Rivière)"
6	Crazy Frog	"Popcorn"
7	Ilona Mitrecey	"C'est les vacances"
8	Sinsemilia	"Tout le bonheur du Monde"
9	Chimène Badi	"Je viens du Sud"
10	Madonna	"Hung Up"

=== Albums ===
Pos.	Artist	Title
1	Raphaël	Caravane
2	Johnny Hallyday	Ma Vérité
3	Les Enfoirés	Le Train des Enfoirés
4	Madonna	Confessions on a Dancefloor
5	Le Roi Soleil	Le Roi Soleil
6	Chimène Badi	Dis-moi que tu m'aimes
7	Calogero	3
8	Mylène Farmer	Avant que l'ombre...
9	Alain Souchon	La Vie Théodore
10	James Blunt	Back to Bedlam

== See also ==
- 2005 in music
- List of number-one hits (France)
- List of artists who reached number one on the French Singles Chart
