= French Top 100 singles of the 2000s =

List of the top 100 singles in France during the 2000s

This is a list of the 100 best-selling singles in France during the 2000s (i.e. release in France from January 1, 2000, to December 31, 2009).

== Top 100 of the 2000s ==
=== Singles ===
Pos.	Artist	Single	Year	Country	Sales	Peak
1	Ilona Mitrecey	"Un Monde parfait"	2005	France	1,520,000	1
2	Yannick	"Ces soirées-là"	2000	France	1,512,000	1
3	Star Academy 1	"La Musique (Angelica)"	2001	France	1,425,000	1
4	Damien Sargue, Philippe D'Avilla and Grégori Baquet	"Les Rois du monde"	2000	France	1,410,000	1
5	Las Ketchup	"The Ketchup Song (Aserejé)"	2002	Spain	1,310,000	1
6	Alizée	"Moi... Lolita"	2000	France	1,282,000	2
7	Bratisla Boys	"Stach Stach"	2002	France	1,250,000	1
8	Crazy Frog	"Axel F"	2005	Sweden	1,236,100	1
9	Daniel Lévi	"L'Envie d'aimer"	2000	France	1,200,000	2
10	L5	"Toutes les femmes de ta vie"	2001	France	1,165,000	1
11	O-Zone	"Dragostea din tei"	2004	Romania	1,101,000	1
12	DJ BoBo	"Chihuahua"	2003	Switzerland	1,050,000	1
13	Johnny Hallyday	"Marie"	2002	France	1,045,000	1
14	Daddy DJ	"Daddy DJ"	2000	France	999,000	2
15	Garou	"Seul"	2000	Canada	990,000	1
16	Shakira	"Whenever, Wherever"	2002	Colombia	970,000	1
17	Kylie Minogue	"Can't Get You Out of My Head"	2001	Australia	918,000	1
18	Les Lofteurs	"Up & Down"	2001	France	863,000	1
19	Geri Halliwell	"It's Raining Men"	2001	United Kingdom	812,000	1
20	Indochine	"J'ai demandé à la lune"	2001	France	780,000	1
21	Cécilia Cara and Damien Sargue	"Aimer"	2000	France	777,000	2
22	Garou and Celine Dion	"Sous le vent"	2001	Canada	744,000	1
23	Tragédie	"Hey Oh"	2003	France	656,000	1
24	Natasha St-Pier	"Tu trouveras"	2002	Canada	652,000	3
25	Lorie	"Près de moi"	2001	France	634,000	2
26	Umberto Tozzi and Lena K	"Ti amo (Rien que des mots)"	2002	Italy; France	609,000	3
27	Rohff	"Qui est l'exemple ?"	2002	France	599,000	1
28	Alizée	"L'Alizé"	2000	France	582,000	1
29	Anastacia	"I'm Outta Love"	2000	United States	573,000	2
30	Saïan Supa Crew	"Angela"	2000	France	568,000	2
31	Aventura	"Obsesión"	2004	United States	565,000	1
32	Amel Bent	"Ma philosophie"	2005	France	560,000	1
33	Hélène Ségara	"Elle, tu l'aimes..."	2000	France	545,000	3
34	Mylène Farmer and Seal	"Les Mots"	2001	France; United Kingdom	539,000	2
35	Santana and The Product G&B	"Maria Maria"	2000	United States	535,000	1
36	Chimène Badi	"Entre nous"	2003	France	531,000	1
37	KCPK	"We Will Rock You (Remix)"	2003	France	530,000	2
38	Marc Lavoine and Cristina Marocco	"J'ai tout oublié"	2001	France; Italy	526,000	1
39	Star Academy 2	"Paris Latino"	2002	France	526,000	1
40	Renaud and Axelle Red	"Manhattan-Kaboul"	2002	France; Belgium	523,000	2
41	Hermes House Band featuring DJ Ötzi	"Live Is Life"	2002	Netherlands; Austria	518,000	2
42	Lorie	"Sur un air latino"	2003	France	517,000	1
43	Alphonse Brown	"Le Frunkp"	2003	France	508,000	1
44	Assia	"Elle est à toi"	2000	Algeria	508,000	3
45	Diam's	"DJ"	2003	Cyprus	508,000	2
46	Jocelyne Labylle and Cheela featuring Passi and Jacob Desvarieux	"Laisse parler les gens"	2003	Guadeloupe; Republic of the Congo; France	507,000	1
47	R. Kelly	"If I Could Turn Back the Hands of Time"	2002	United States	505,000	2
48	Ève Angeli	"Avant de partir"	2000	France	501,000	4
49	MC Solaar	"Inch'Allah"	2002	France	500,000	1
50	Florent Pagny	"Ma liberté de penser"	2003	France	497,000	1
51	Star Academy 4	"Laissez-moi danser"	2004	France	495,000	1
52	Pinocchio	"T'es pas cap Pinocchio"	2005	France	483,300	2
53	K.Maro	"Femme Like U (Donne-moi ton corps)"	2004	Lebanon	482,000	1
54	Crazy Frog	"Popcorn"	2005	Sweden	480,100	1
55	Eminem	"Without Me"	2002	United States	478,000	3
56	Jenifer	"Au soleil"	2002	France	475,000	2
57	Modjo	"Lady (Hear Me Tonight)"	2000	France	474,000	7
58	Bonnie Tyler and Kareen Antonn	"Si demain... (Turn Around)"	2003	United Kingdom; France	473,000	1
59	Isabelle Boulay	"Parle-moi"	2000	Canada	468,000	2
60	MC Solaar	"Hasta la Vista"	2001	France	466,000	1
61	Fatal Bazooka	"Fous ta cagoule"	2006	France	463,900	1
62	Dezil'	"San ou (la rivière)"	2005	Seychelles	463,600	2
63	Johnny Hallyday	"Tous ensemble"	2002	France	461,000	1
64	Shaggy featuring Ricardo "RikRok" Ducent	"It Wasn't Me"	2001	Jamaica; United Kingdom	458,000	1
65	Star Academy 3	"L'Orange / Wot"	2003	France	449,000	1
66	Ilona Mitrecey	"C'est les vacances"	2005	France	445,100	2
67	Phil Barney and Marlène Duval	"Un enfant de toi"	2002	France	439,000	1
68	Zazie and Axel Bauer	"À ma place"	2001	France	432,000	4
69	Garou and Michel Sardou	"La Rivière de notre enfance"	2004	Canada; France	425,000	1
70	Mary J. Blige	"Family Affair"	2001	United States	420,000	1
71	Star Academy 3	"La Bamba"	2003	France	417,000	2
72	Billy Crawford	"Trackin'"	2001	Philippines; United States	416,000	5
73	Nuttea	"Elle te rend dingue (poom poom short)"	2000	France	410,000	4
74	Madonna	"Hung Up"	2005	United States	409,100	1
75	Yannick Noah	"La voix des sages (No More Fighting)"	2001	France	408,000	3
76	T-Rio	"(Choopeta) Mamãe eu quero"	2004	Brazil	408,000	2
77	Nuttea	"Trop peu de temps"	2001	France	407,000	5
78	King Africa	"La Bomba"	2000	Argentina	406,000	4
79	Manu Chao	"Me Gustas Tú"	2001	France	401,000	2
80	Les G.O. Cul-ture	"Darla dirladada"	2000	France	398,000	1
82	Eminem	"Stan"	2000	United States	398,000	4
83	Papi Sánchez	"Enamorame"	2003	Dominican Republic	396,000	2
84	Supermen Lovers	"Starlight"	2001	France	393,000	2
85	The Black Eyed Peas	"I Gotta Feeling"	2009	United States	390,000	2
86	Eminem	"The Real Slim Shady"	2000	United States	382,000	6
87	Mad'House	"Like a Prayer"	2002	Netherlands	379,000	5
88	Faf Larage	"Pas le temps"	2002	France	378,000	1
89	David Guetta featuring Chris Willis	"Love Don't Let Me Go"	2002	France; United States	376,000	4
90	Calogero and Passi	"Face à la mer"	2004	France; Republic of the Congo	370,000	3
91	Leslie featuring Amine	"Sobri (notre destin)"	2004	France; Morocco	365,000	2
92	Lorna	"Papi chulo... (te traigo el mmmm...)"	2003	Panama	362,000	1
93	Dante Thomas featuring Pras	"Miss California"	2001	United States	353,000	3
94	Kamini	"Marly-Gomont"	2006	France	351,000	1
95	The Spooks	"Things I've Seen"	2000	United States	351,000	4
96	Da Muttz	"Wassuup!"	2001	United Kingdom	350,000	2
97	Sully Sefil	"J'voulais"	2001	France	350,000	2
98	Sinsemilia	"Tout le bonheur du Monde"	2004	France	350,000	4
99	Helmut Fritz	"Ça m'énerve"	2009	France	348,020	1
100	La Plage	"Coup de Boule"	2006	France	343,000	1

== See also ==
- List of number-one hits (France)
