= 2005 in music =

This is a list of notable events in music that took place in the year 2005.

== Specific locations ==
- 2005 in British music
- 2005 in Irish music
- 2005 in Norwegian music
- 2005 in Scandinavian music
- 2005 in South Korean music
- 2005 in Swiss music

== Specific genres ==
- 2005 in classical music
- 2005 in country music
- 2005 in heavy metal music
- 2005 in hip-hop
- 2005 in jazz
- 2005 in Latin music
- 2005 in progressive rock
- 2005 in rock music

== Events ==
=== January ===
- January 1 – In most of Europe, copyright expired on a number of classic pop and rock'n'roll songs recorded in 1954 and earlier, including Bill Haley's "Rock Around the Clock", and "Only You" by The Platters.
- January 7 – Welsh punk band Mclusky officially announce their disbanding via their website. Weeks later, Welsh noisecore/punk band Jarcrew disband due to their drummer becoming a Jehovah's Witness – remnants of the two bands later went on to join forces and become Future of the Left.
- January 13 – Duran Duran begins their Astronaut in London, England.
- January 17 – Prior to missing 2 live shows, Mike Tempesta is officially no longer part of Powerman 5000 due to fighting with the band.
- January 20 – Leonard Slatkin conducts the debut concert of Philip Glass's Symphony No. 7 "Toltec".
- January 21–February 6 – The Big Day Out festival takes place in Australia and New Zealand, headlined by Beastie Boys, The Chemical Brothers and System of a Down.
- January 22 – The Tsunami Relief concert is held at the Millennium Stadium, Cardiff, Wales – the largest live music event in the UK since the Live Aid concert of 1985. Performers included Madonna, Eric Clapton, Jools Holland, Manic Street Preachers, Lulu, Aled Jones, Charlotte Church, Katherine Jenkins, Feeder, Snow Patrol, Liberty X.
- January 29 – Avril Lavigne, Chantal Kreviazuk, the Barenaked Ladies, Raine Maida, and Sarah McLachlan conduct a concert in Vancouver, British Columbia, for tsunami relief.
- January 31
  - Tiesto releases a new single from his album Just Be entitled Adagio for Strings.
  - Jon Levasseur leaves Cryptopsy, saying he has lost interest in Extreme Music.

=== February ===
- February 7 – The BRIT Awards are held in London. Scissor Sisters, Keane, Franz Ferdinand, and Joss Stone are among the winners.
- February 8 – Matchbox Twenty frontman Rob Thomas releases Lonely No More, his first solo hit. It peaked at #1 in Adult Contemporary.
- February 13 – The 47th Grammy Awards are held in Staples Center, Los Angeles, California, hosted by Queen Latifah. The late Ray Charles becomes the big winner at the ceremony, winning five awards, including Album of the Year for Genius Loves Company and Record of the Year for a re-recorded duet version of "Here We Go Again" with Norah Jones. John Mayer's "Daughters" wins Song of the Year, while Maroon 5 win Best New Artist. Britney Spears earned her first Grammy in the category of Best Dance Recording for her hit single Toxic.
- February 15 – Sonny Mayo replaces Clint Lowery in Sevendust.
- February 22
  - After being silent since late 2004, Blink-182 announce that they will be taking an indefinite hiatus, the news comes as a big shock for fans. According to guitarist Tom DeLonge, the band will not come completely inactive.
  - Brian Welch, guitarist of Korn, leaves the band after converting to Christianity.
- February 28 – Static-X fires Tripp Eisen because of his arrest for sex offenses involving a minor.

=== March ===
- March 7 – Koichi Fukuda rejoins Static-X on guitar after 5 years away from the band. Fukuda replaces Tripp Eisen, who was arrested twice in February over two separate charges of sexual intercourse with underage girls.
- March 14 – Daft Punk releases their third studio album Human After All.
- March 26 – Australian drummer of Crowded House, Paul Hester, is found dead in a Melbourne Park.
- March 29 – Mariah Carey releases her second single, "We Belong Together", from her tenth studio album, The Emancipation of Mimi. The song would hold the number one position on the Billboard Hot 100 for 14 weeks, the highest record for the entire decade. Will Smith releases his fourth studio album (first under Interscope Records) Lost and Found.

=== April ===
- April 3
  - Country music legend Kenny Rogers signs a major worldwide record deal with Capitol Records.
  - Alice in Chains original bass player Mike Starr is arrested for "investigation of property destruction and theft". He was also sentenced to 30 days for misdemeanor drug possession in April 1994, two years after being replaced from the group during the recording of Dirt.
- April 7 – The concert Selena ¡VIVE! takes place at Reliant Stadium in Houston. The memorial concert was held on the 10th anniversary of the murder by firearm of Selena, "The Queen of Tejano Music". Performers include Thalía, Gloria Estefan, Paulina Rubio, Pepe Aguilar, Banda el Recodo, Alejandra Guzmán and Fey.
- April 9 – Destiny's Child launch their World Tour Destiny Fulfilled... and Lovin' It in Hiroshima, Japan.
- April 12 – Mariah Carey releases her tenth studio album, The Emancipation of Mimi. The album went on to become the best-selling album of 2005 in the US, and the second-best seller worldwide, with global sales of 10 million copies. Its second single, "We Belong Together", was later hailed "Song of the Decade" by Billboard and accumulated 14 weeks at number one in the US, while its third single, "Shake It Off", reached number two. The album begins a career revival is her biggest success of the decade.

=== May ===
- May–June – Operation Ivy/Rancid bassist Matt Freeman is diagnosed with lung cancer.
- May 2
  - Legendary blues-rock group Cream reunites for four shows in London's Royal Albert Hall.
  - Linkin Park issues a press release demanding to end its contract with Warner Music Group, on the grounds that the label would fail to meet its "fiduciary responsibility to market and promote Linkin Park" due to cost-cutting efforts at the company.
  - Nu metal Band Limp Bizkit Released their EP The Unquestionable Truth (Part 1).
- May 6 – Audioslave becomes the first American rock group to perform a free outdoor concert in Cuba.
- May 17 – Kylie Minogue is diagnosed with breast cancer. Thus she has to cancel her Showgirl: The Greatest Hits Tour.
  - System of a Down release their fourth studio album Mezmerize.
- May 19–21 – The 50th Eurovision Song Contest, held at the Palace of Sports in Kyiv, Ukraine, is won by Greek-Swedish singer Helena Paparizou, representing Greece with the song "My Number One". It is the first contest to be broadcast in widescreen 16:9 format.
- May 21 – The Los Angeles radio station KROQ-FM airs the 13th Annual Weenie Roast show with Alkaline Trio, Audioslave, Bloc Party, The Bravery, The Dead 60s, Foo Fighters, Hot Hot Heat, Interpol, Jimmy Eat World, The Killers, The Mars Volta, Mötley Crüe, MxPx, My Chemical Romance, Queens of the Stone Age and The Transplants.
- May 24 – Audioslave releases their second studio album Out of Exile. The album debuted No. 1 on the Billboard 200.
- May 25 – Carrie Underwood wins the fourth season of American Idol. Bo Bice is named runner-up.
- May 27 – Gretchen Wilson guest Miranda Lambert at the Schottenstein Center in Columbus, Ohio.

=== June ===
- June 4 – Mariah Carey's "We Belong Together" became her sixteenth chart topper on the US Billboard Hot 100. The song then spent 14 non-consecutive weeks at number one on both the US Billboard Hot 100 and Hot R&B/Hip-Hop Songs chart. It made history when it became the first song to simultaneously occupy the number one position on nine Billboard charts (the week ending August 6, 2005): the Hot 100, Hot 100 Airplay, Hot R&B/Hip-Hop Songs, Hot R&B/Hip-Hop Airplay, Pop 100 Airplay, Top 40 Mainstream, Rhythmic Airplay Chart, Hot Dance Club Songs, and Hot Ringtones.
- June 10-12 – The annual Download Festival takes place at Donington Park in Leicestershire, England, the festival's first three-day event. Feeder, Black Sabbath and System of a Down headline the main stage, while the Snickers stage is headlined by Billy Idol, In Flames and Motörhead, the Napster stage by Napalm Death, Helmet and Therapy?, and the Snickers Bowl stage by TAT, Reuben and Electric Eel Shock.
- June 12 – Pink Floyd announce that they will reunite with former bassist Roger Waters, who left the band in 1985, on July 2 for the Live 8 London concert. This will be the first time the band played together as a quartet since The Wall tour in 1981, and the first public performance by Pink Floyd since 1994.
- June 13 – Michael Jackson is found not guilty of child molestation.
- June 14 – The Backstreet Boys came back and released their fifth studio album Never Gone after a nearly 5-year hiatus
- June 15 – Destiny's Child announce they will disband upon completion of their world tour.
- June 16 – Motörhead celebrate their 30th anniversary with a concert in the Hammersmith Apollo, which is later released on DVD.
- June 18–19 – Green Day films their first ever live CD/DVD Bullet in a Bible at the National Bowl in Milton Keynes, England. They played to over 130,000 fans in two days.
- June 21 – Billy Corgan announces that he wants to reform his popular alternative rock group The Smashing Pumpkins, which disbanded on December 2, 2000.
- June 25 – Patti Smith curates the Meltdown festival.

=== July–August ===
- July 2 – Live 8 benefit concerts are held around the world, as part of the Make Poverty History campaign.
- July 4 – The Charlie Daniels Band plays (and makes a concert DVD) at Riverfront Park in Nashville, Tennessee
- July 6 – Lil' Kim is sentenced to a year and a day in prison for lying to a federal grand jury about her knowledge of suspects in a 2001 shooting outside a New York radio station.
- July 21 – Gigantour runs through to September 11, a festival organised by Megadeth frontman Dave Mustaine with bands including Dream Theater, Anthrax, Fear Factory and Nevermore.
- July 23–24 – The annual Splendour in the Grass music festival is held in Byron Bay, Australia, headlined by Queens of the Stone Age and Moby.
- August 9 – Staind releases Chapter V, which becomes their third-straight studio album to reach #1 on the US Billboard 200 album charts.
- August 18 – Interscope Records reports that Eminem has entered rehab for dependency on sleep medication. The rapper had canceled the European leg of the Anger Management 3 Tour two days earlier, citing exhaustion. A four-year hiatus would ensue until the release of the Relapse album in 2009.
- August 24-31 – The UNESCO-sponsored Fifth Sharq Taronalari (Melodies of the East) International Music Festival is held in Samarkand.
- August 26 – Rihanna releases her debut album Music of the Sun, which debuts at number 10 on the US Billboard 200. The album produced two singles that achieved international chart success, including first single "Pon de Replay", which topped number 2 at the US Billboard Hot 100.
- August 28 – Death Row Records CEO Suge Knight is shot in the leg at an MTV Video Music Awards pre-party in Miami. No one is ever charged in the shooting.
- August 30 - Kanye West releases his 2nd studio album "Late Registration".

=== September–October ===
- September 2
  - A statue of Edward Elgar by Jemma Pearson is unveiled near Hereford Cathedral.
  - A Concert for Hurricane Relief airs on NBC and its affiliates, the first of several benefit concerts held to raise funds for Hurricane Katrina relief efforts. Shelter from the Storm: A Concert for the Gulf Coast and ReAct Now: Music & Relief air the following week. From the Big Apple to the Big Easy, a pair of simultaneous benefit concerts at Madison Square Garden and Radio City Music Hall, are held on September 20. On A Concert for Hurricane Relief, rapper Kanye West makes controversial statement, "George Bush doesn't care about black people".
- September 9 – The band Scooter perform at the All-State Arena in Chicago, IL, their first performance in the United States.
- September 10 – Destiny's Child breaks up after the finishing of their Destiny Fulfilled...and Lovin' it Tour.
- September 20 – J.D. Fortune wins Rock Star: INXS, a reality TV singing contest to become the new lead vocalist of Australian rock band INXS.
- September 27 – American rock band Panic! at the Disco released their debut album "A Fever You Can't Sweat Out". Actor Drake Bell releases his debut musical album Telegraph. Dancehall artist Sean Paul releases his third album titled The Trinity. American rapper Common releases the single "Testify" for his 2005 album Be.
- October 1
  - Sentenced plays their final show.
  - Akcent releases their first single (and video) from their album French Kiss with Kylie entitled Kylie.
- October 4 – J.D. Fortune releases his first single with INXS called Pretty Vegas
- October 11 - The band Simon Dawes is formed.
- October 15 – Media reported that Latin star Luis Miguel has released his own vintage of wine, "Unico. Luis Miguel", a Cabernet Sauvignon.
- October 21 – Nightwish perform at the Hartwall Areena, later to be released as the End of an Era DVD. The following day, singer Tarja Turunen is dismissed in an open letter.
- October 25 – NSYNC releases their first compilation album Greatest Hits three years after their breakup.
- October 31 – Greatest Hits is released. It is a collection of Blink-182's greatest singles. At the time of the release, Blink-182 were on an indefinite hiatus but would later reunite in 2009 and release their sixth studio album Neighborhoods in 2011.

=== November ===
- November 5, guitarist Link Wray of the Ray Men dies at age 76 in Copenhagen, Denmark
- November 6 – Madonna earns her 36th Top Ten single with Warner Bros. Records-based, ABBA-sampled "Hung Up". This ties her with Elvis Presley for the most Top Ten singles. The Beatles have 34. "Hung Up" is also Madonna's 47th Top Forty single – the most for any female artist. Her new album Confessions On A Dance Floor hits #1 in 40 countries during the month, a new record. (The Beatles also previously held this record when The Beatles 1 went to #1 in 36 countries in 2000.)
- November 8 – The first Guitar Hero video game is released for the PlayStation 2. The game becomes a major hit, would help make rhythm games one of the most popular video game genres, and increased the sales of artists who have their songs included in the games.
- November 14 – Country music superstars Trisha Yearwood, Martina McBride, Barbara Mandrell, Carrie Underwood and Jo Dee Messina at the CNN's Larry King Live.
- November 15
  - The Sony BMG copy protection rootkit scandal breaks as Sony BMG announces that it will recall all remaining stock of an estimated 15 million CDs containing copy protection that exposes the computers of consumers to serious security risks if played in their PC disc drives. Several class action lawsuits are filed against Sony in the ensuing public relations disaster.
  - All-female group Danity Kane is formed on MTV show Making The Band.
- November 20 – Madonna's Warner Bros. Records-based (Festival Mushroom Records in Australia) single, "Hung Up" takes the title as the ARIA #1 single.
- November 21 – Kate DeAraugo takes the title of Australian Idol 2005, ahead of Emily Williams.
- November 22
  - The 33rd annual American Music Awards are held. Multiple winners are Destiny's Child, Tim McGraw, Kelly Clarkson, The Black Eyed Peas, and Green Day.
  - System of a Down becomes the third musical act to have two number 1 albums in the same year. The other two to do this record were DMX & The Beatles.
  - Britney Spears releases her first remix album, B in the Mix: The Remixes. The album had sold 1 million copies worldwide, making it one of the best selling remix album of all time.
- November 24 – Carrie Underwood releases the music video for "Jesus, Take the Wheel".
- November 29 – Chris Brown comes onto the music scene at age 16 with the release of his debut album Chris Brown. Making him the second youngest male R&B artist to come into the music business since Usher in 1994.
- November 30 – Apocalyptica change locations of the shoot of their DVD "The Life Burns Tour" from Erfurt, Germany (Dec. 2) to Düsseldorf, Germany (Dec. 4) due to technical reasons.

=== December ===
- December 3 – Marilyn Manson and Dita Von Teese hold a wedding ceremony in Ireland.
- December 6 – Korn's seventh studio album, See You on the Other Side, debuts at number 3 on the Billboard 200. This is the first album without longtime guitarist Brian "Head" Welch and is the last to feature original drummer David Silveria.
- December 7 – The nominations for the 48th Grammy Awards are announced. The top-nominated artists include Mariah Carey, John Legend, and Kanye West, with eight nominations each. Other nominated artists include Gwen Stefani, Beyoncé Knowles (two of her own, plus four with Destiny's Child), Kelly Clarkson, and 50 Cent.
- December 10
  - Amnesty International launches its "Make Some Noise" music initiative.
  - The Los Angeles radio station KROQ-FM airs the 16th annual Acoustic Christmas. On November 10, 2005, KROQ's official website announced that it will include Avenged Sevenfold, Fall Out Boy, Korn, Nine Inch Nails, Rise Against, System of a Down and Thrice for the first night. The second night is held the following day, as also announced at KROQ's official website on November 15, 2005 and includes The Bravery, Coldplay, Death Cab for Cutie, Depeche Mode, Hot Hot Heat, Jack Johnson, Nada Surf and The White Stripes.
- December 11 – Peter Wichers leaves Soilwork.
- December 15 – Madonna's Warner Bros. Records-based single, "Hung Up" sets a new record in the download charts by staying at #1 for 7 consecutive weeks. The single first appears on Z100 New York, closely followed by 2Day FM (Sydney), Fox FM (Melbourne) and Nova 96.9 (Sydney) other stations follow including: Mix 106.5 (Sydney), Mix 101.1 (Melbourne), Vega 95.3 (Sydney), Vega 91.5 (Melbourne) and the rest of the MIX FM stations.
- December 17 – Shayne Ward is named winner of the second series of The X Factor UK. Andy Abraham is named runner-up, while Journey South and Brenda Edwards finish third and fourth respectively.
- December 21 – Elton John marries David Furnish in London. This marriage comes in the wake of new British laws affording gay unions the same legal protection enjoyed within straight marriages.
- December 31
  - Mariah Carey earns her 17th #1 single with "Don't Forget About Us", tying with Elvis for second as the act with the most #1 singles. The Beatles have 20. She also becomes the first act to perform live in Times Square on the Dick Clark's New Year's Rockin' Eve television special on this day.
  - Glue Gun reforms after eight years, with frontman Bob Oedy the only original member. The new line-up is Bob Oedy (vocals), Joey Rimicci (guitars), Brian Priess (bass) and Andy Alverez (drums). Rimicci and Priess were previously members of Jughead's Revenge.

=== Also in 2005 ===
- UNESCO declares the Mongolian Long song one of the Masterpieces of the Oral and Intangible Heritage of Humanity
- The popular song "Big Chief" faced censorship for its racially sensitive content and themes. In some point, the song would eventually play on the radio during Mardi Gras with the lyrics removed before retiring it from circulation over a decade later.

== Bands formed ==
- See Category:Musical groups established in 2005

== Returning performers ==
- Bloodhound Gang (first studio album since 2000)
- Daft Punk (first studio album since 2005)
- Garbage (first studio album since 2001)
- Gym Class Heroes (first studio album since 2001)
- INXS (first studio album since 1997)
- Silver Jews (first studio album since 2001)
- The Rolling Stones (first studio album since 1997)
- Kate Bush (first studio album since 1993)

== Bands disbanded ==
- See Category:Musical groups disestablished in 2005

== Bands reformed ==
- Alice in Chains
- Backstreet Boys (Hiatus since 2002)
- Buckcherry
- Devourment
- Luv'
- Junior M.A.F.I.A.
- Van der Graaf Generator

== Top 5 Biggest Hits ==
#	Title	Artist	Country	Chart entries
1	"We Belong Together"	Mariah Carey	United States	AUS: #1, AUT: #31, BEL FL: #12, BEL W: #24, HR: #1, DEN: #3, SV: #5, EU: #4, FR: #12, GER: #11, GR: #28, ICE: #17, IRE: #3, IT: #25, NLD: #3, NZ: #2, NOR, #9, PAN: #2, PL: #1, ROU: #30, SCO: #6, ESP: #3, SWE: #11, SWI: #4, UK: #2, US: #1, VE: #1
2	"Hollaback Girl"	Gwen Stefani	United States	AUS: #1, AUT: #5, BEL FL: #6, BEL W: #16, CAN: #12, CIS: #182, CZ: #36, DEN: #5, EU: #5, FIN: #8, FR: 17, GER: #3, GR: #13, HU: #23, IRE: #4, IT: #6, NLD: #7, NZ: #3, NOR, #6, ROU: #22, SCO: #9, SWE: #7, SWI: #6, UK: #8, US: #1
3	"Let Me Love You"	Mario	United States	AUS: #3, AUT: #6, BEL FL: #3, BEL W: #12, CZ: #46 DEN: #2, EU: #46, FIN: #16, FR: #7, GER: #1, HU: #18, IRE: #5, IT: #2, NLD: #2, NZ: #1, NOR, #5, SCO: #3, ESP: #18, SWE: #18, SWI: #2, UK: #2, US: #1
4	"Since U Been Gone"	Kelly Clarkson	United States	AUS: #3, AUT: #3, BEL FL: #22, BEL W: #31, CAN: #2, EU: #5, GER: #6, GR: #39, IRE: #4, IT: #35, NLD: #10, NZ: #11, NOR, #9, SCO: #3, SWE: #16, SWI: #7, UK: #5, US: #2
5	"Gold Digger"	Kanye West featuring Jamie Foxx	United States	AUS: #1, AUT: #47, BEL FL: #104, BEL W: #114, CAN: #5, FR: #71, GER: #35, IRE: #3, NLD: #22, NZ: #1, NOR, #14, SCO: #3, SWE: #34, SWI: #52, UK: #2, US: #1

== Other hits ==
- "2 Bajki" – Virgin
- "1 Thing" – Amerie
- "16 Years" – Mzbel
- "Adagio for Strings" – Tiësto
- "Advertising Space" – Robbie Williams
- "All About Us" – t.A.T.u.
- "All About You/You've Got a Friend" – McFly
- "All Hands Against His Own" – The Black Keys
- "Almost Dead" – Powerman 5000
- "Amor A Medias" – Ha*Ash
- "An Honest Mistake" – The Bravery
- "Are You Ready" – Shakaya
- "Attack" – Thirty Seconds To Mars
- "Aún hay algo" – RBD
- "Automatic (I'm Talking to You)" – Elize
- "Axel F" – Crazy Frog
- "Bad Day" – Daniel Powter
- "Bat Country" – Avenged Sevenfold
- "Be Without You" – Mary J. Blige
- "Be Yourself" – Audioslave
- "Because Of You" – Kelly Clarkson
- "Behind These Hazel Eyes" – Kelly Clarkson
- "Believe" – The Chemical Brothers
- "Best of You" – Foo Fighters
- "Better Days" – Goo Goo Dolls
- "Beverly Hills" – Weezer
- "Black Horse and the Cherry Tree" – KT Tunstall
- "Bokutachi no Yukue" – Hitomi Takahashi
- "Breathe In" – Lucie Silvas
- "Bullets" – Editors
- "Call On Me" – Eric Prydz
- "Can I Have It Like That" – Pharrell Williams featuring Gwen Stefani
- "Candy Shop" – 50 Cent featuring Olivia
- "Catch My Disease" – Ben Lee
- "Chariot" – Gavin DeGraw
- "C'est les vacances" – Ilona Mitrecey
- "Check On It" – Beyoncé featuring Slim Thug and Bun B
- "Come se non fosse stato mai amore" – Laura Pausini
- "Cool" – Gwen Stefani
- "Crazy" – Alanis Morissette
- "Crazy" – Simple Plan
- "Dance, Dance" – Fall Out Boy
- "Dans ma fusée" – Ilona Mitrecey
- "Den döda vinkeln" – Kent
- "Diamonds from Sierra Leone" – Kanye West
- "Dirty Little Secret" – The All-American Rejects
- "Disappear" – Hoobastank
- "Do Somethin'" – Britney Spears
- "Do You Want To" – Franz Ferdinand
- "Don't Bother" – Shakira
- "Don't Cha" – The Pussycat Dolls featuring Busta Rhymes
- "Don't Forget About Us" – Mariah Carey
- "Don't Lie" – The Black Eyed Peas
- "Don't Phunk with My Heart" – The Black Eyed Peas
- "E-Pro" – Beck
- "Écris l'histoire" – Grégory Lemarchal
- "Every Day Is Exactly the Same" - Nine Inch Nails
- "Everything Is Alright" – Motion City Soundtrack
- "Everytime We Touch" – Cascada
- "Fading In Fading Out" – Ringo Starr
- "Feeling Good" – Michael Bublé
- "Fight The Power" – Korn featuring Xzibit
- "Fix You" – Coldplay
- "Follow Through" – Gavin Degraw
- "Fuck Them All" – Mylène Farmer
- "Get Right" – Jennifer Lopez
- "Get Your Number" – Mariah Carey
- "Ghetto" – Akon
- "Gold Digger" – Kanye West featuring Jamie Foxx
- "Guns at Dawn" – Baron featuring Pendulum
- "Hate It or Love It" – The Game featuring 50 Cent
- "Have A Nice Day" – Bon Jovi
- "He Wasn't" – Avril Lavigne
- "Heard 'Em Say" – Kanye West featuring Adam Levine of Maroon 5
- "Heavy on My Heart" – Anastacia
- "Helena" – My Chemical Romance
- "Hide Head Blues" – Jim Mills
- "Holiday" – Green Day
- "Hollaback Girl" – Gwen Stefani
- "Home" – Michael Bublé
- "Hoppípolla" – Sigur Rós
- "Hung Up" – Madonna
- "Hypnotize" – System of a Down
- "I Am... All of Me" – Crush 40
- "I Bet You Look Good on the Dancefloor" – Arctic Monkeys
- "I Caught Fire" – The Used
- "I Just Wanna Live" – Good Charlotte
- "Incomplete" – Backstreet Boys
- "Inside Your Heaven" – Carrie Underwood
- "(Is This the Way to) Amarillo" – Tony Christie featuring Peter Kay
- "It's Like That" – Mariah Carey featuring Jermaine Dupri, and Fatman Scoop
- "Jesus of Suburbia" – Green Day
- "Jesus, Take the Wheel" – Carrie Underwood
- "Jing! Jingeling! Der Weihnachtsschnappi!" – Schnappi
- "Jump" – Paul Anka
- "Judas Rising" – Judas Priest
- "Just a Lil Bit" – 50 Cent
- "Just Lose It" – Eminem
- "Just the Girl" – The Click Five
- "Just Want You to Know" – Backstreet Boys
- "Kylie" – Akcent
- "La Tortura" – Shakira featuring Alejandro Sanz
- "Lazy Sunday" – The Lonely Island
- "Le Casse de Brice" – Jean Dujardin
- "Liebt sie dich so wie ich?" – Christina Stürmer
- "Like Toy Soldiers" – Eminem
- "Listen to Your Heart" – DHT featuring Edmee
- "Lonely" – Akon
- "Lonely No More" – Rob Thomas
- "Looking at the World from the Bottom of a Well" – Mike Doughty
- "Lose Control" – Missy Elliott featuring Fatman Scoop and Ciara
- "Love Generation" – Bob Sinclar featuring Gary Pine
- "Luxurious" – Gwen Stefani
- "Lyla" – Oasis
- "Ma Philosophie" – Amel Bent
- "Me pregunto" – Belanova
- "Mockingbird" – Eminem
- "Mon Plus Beau Noël" – Johnny Hallyday
- "Money (Live 8 Version)" – Pink Floyd
- "Must Get Out" – Maroon 5
- "My Doorbell" – The White Stripes
- "My Humps" – The Black Eyed Peas
- "Nine Million Bicycles" – Katie Melua
- "No Reason" – Sum 41
- "O Green World" – Gorillaz
- "Obsession (No Es Amor)" – Frankie J featuring Baby Bash
- "Oh" – Ciara featuring Ludacris
- "Ohio (Come Back to Texas)" – Bowling for Soup
- "One Word" – Kelly Osbourne
- "Only" – Nine Inch Nails
- "Only One" – Yellowcard
- "Other Side of the World" – KT Tunstall
- "Per Sempre (for Always)" – Anthony Callea
- "Photograph" – Nickelback
- "Pieces" – Sum 41
- "Po Tebe" – Toše Proeski
- "Pon de Replay" – Rihanna
- "Pot of Gold" – Akon
- "Predictable" – Good Charlotte
- "Pressure" – Paramore
- "Pretty Vegas" – INXS
- "Push the Button" – Sugababes
- "Rough Justice" – The Rolling Stones
- "Rich Girl" – Gwen Stefani ft. Eve
- "Run It!" – Chris Brown featuring Juelz Santana
- "San ou (La Rivière)" – Dezil'
- "Santiano" – Star Academy
- "Say Na Say Na" – Aneela Mirza
- "Scars" – Papa Roach
- "Schnappi, das kleine Krokodil" – Schnappi
- "Shake It Off" – Mariah Carey
- "Shot You Down" – Audio Bullys featuring Nancy Sinatra
- "Shut Up!" – Simple Plan
- "Signs" – Snoop Dogg featuring Justin Timberlake, and Charlie Wilson
- "Silikon" – Modeselektor featuring Sasha Perera
- "Sitting, Waiting, Wishing" – Jack Johnson
- "Slam" – Pendulum
- "Some Say" – Sum 41
- "Someday (I Will Understand)" – Britney Spears
- "Sometimes You Can't Make It On Your Own" – U2
- "Speed of Sound" – Coldplay
- "Spitfire" – The Prodigy
- "Stickwitu" – The Pussycat Dolls featuring Avant
- "Sugar, We're Goin Down" – Fall Out Boy
- "Suddenly I See" – KT Tunstall
- "Switch" – Will Smith
- "Talk" – Coldplay
- "Tarantula" – Pendulum
- "The Boxer" – The Chemical Brothers
- "The Chronicles of Life and Death" – Good Charlotte
- "The Hand That Feeds" - Nine Inch Nails
- "The Importance of Being Idle" – Oasis
- "These Boots are Made for Walking" – Jessica Simpson
- "Tomorrow Comes Today"– Gorillaz
- "Torah Torah" – Cheb i Sabbah
- "Tripping" – Robbie Williams
- "Twisted Transistor" – Korn
- "U Don't Know Me" – T.I.
- "Ugly" – Sugababes
- "Uhn Tiss Uhn Tiss Uhn Tiss" – The Bloodhound Gang
- "Un Monde parfait" – Ilona Mitrecey
- "Under the Weather" – KT Tunstall
- "Untitled (How Could This Happen to Me?)" – Simple Plan
- "Unwritten" – Natasha Bedingfield
- "Voodoo People" – The Prodigy featuring Pendulum and Audio Bullys
- "Wake Me Up When September Ends" – Green Day
- "Waters of Nazareth" – Justice
- "We Be Burnin'" – Sean Paul
- "We Believe" – Good Charlotte
- "We Belong Together" – Mariah Carey (#2 on Radio Top 40 of 2005)
- "We Don't Care Anymore" – Story of the Year
- "What Happens Tomorrow" – Duran Duran
- "When I'm Gone" – Eminem
- "Window Shopper" – 50 Cent
- "You and Me" – Lifehouse
- "You Raise Me Up" – Westlife
- "You're Beautiful" – James Blunt

== Opera ==
- Mark Adamo – Lysistrata, or The Nude Goddess
- John Coolidge Adams – Doctor Atomic
- Philippe Boesmans – Julie
- Richard Danielpour – Margaret Garner
- Matthew Dewey – The Death of Chatterton
- Lorenzo Ferrero – La Conquista
- Nicholas Lens – The Accacha Chronicles Trilogy: Amor Aeternus – Hymns of Love
- Lorin Maazel – 1984
- Roger Scruton – Violet
- Roger Waters – Ça Ira

== Musical theater ==
- Acorn Antiques: The Musical! – London production opened at the Theatre Royal, Haymarket, in February
- The 25th Annual Putnam County Spelling Bee – Broadway production opened at the Circle in the Square Theatre on May 2 and ran for 1136 performances
- All Shook Up (Joe DiPietro) – Broadway production opened at the Palace Theatre on March 24 and ran for 213 performances
- Billy Elliot the Musical (Elton John & Lee Hall) --London production opened at the Victoria Palace Theatre in March
- Chitty Chitty Bang Bang – Broadway production opened at the Foxwoods Theatre (then the Hilton Theatre) on April 28 and ran for 285 performances
- The Color Purple - Broadway production opened at the Broadway Theatre on December 1 and ran for 910 performances
- Dirty Rotten Scoundrels – Broadway production opened at the Imperial Theatre on March 3 and ran for 627 performances
- Good Vibrations – Broadway production opened at the Eugene O'Neill Theatre on February 2 and ran for 94 performances
- Hoy No Me Puedo Levantar opened at the Rialto Theatre, Madrid.
- Lennon (John Lennon, Don Scardino) – Broadway production opened at the Broadhurst Theatre on August 14 and ran for 49 performances
- The Light in the Piazza (Craig Lucas & Adam Guettel) – Broadway production opened at the Vivian Beaumont Theater on April 18 and ran for 504 performances
- Little Women (Allan Knee, Mindi Dickstein & Jason Howland) – Broadway production opened at the Virginia Theatre on January 23 and ran for 137 performances
- Monty Python's Spamalot – Chicago production opened at the Shubert Theatre
- The Woman in White – Broadway production opened at the Marquis Theatre on November 17 and ran for 109 performances

== Musical films ==
- Bhagya Chakra
- Boss'n Up (December 6)
- Charlie and the Chocolate Factory
- Confessions of a Thug
- Corpse Bride
- Custom Made 10.30 (Kasutomu Meido Jū Ten San Zero; October 29)
- Habana Blues
- Hustle & Flow
- Koi Tujh Sa Kahaan (August 12)
- Makalkku
- Marilyn Hotchkiss' Ballroom Dancing and Charm School
- Molla Barir Bou
- Mrs Henderson Presents starring Judi Dench, Bob Hoskins and Will Young
- Naran (September 3)
- Perhaps Love (December 8)
- The Phantom Of The Opera (January 21)
- The Producers (December 16)
- Rent (November 23)
- Romance & Cigarettes
- Thommanum Makkalum (March 18)
- Two Sons of Francisco (2 Filhos de Francisco)
- Walk the Line

== Births ==
- January 20 - Glaive, American singer, songwriter, rapper, and record producer
- January 21 - IShowSpeed, American rapper, YouTuber, streamer
- January 29
  - Fakemink, British rapper and producer
  - Sofia Isella, American singer-songwriter and music producer
- March 28 – d4vd, American singer and songwriter
- April 4 – Lil Mabu, American rapper
- May 29 - Ian, American singer, rapper, and songwriter
- May 31 - coshki - rapper
- June 25 - Kylie Cantrall, American actress, singer, and social media personality
- July 3 – Flowerovlove, British-Ivorian singer-songwriter, producer and model
- July 5 - Sombr, American singer-songwriter
- July 17 - Theoz, Swedish singer
- August 3 – Owen Isabelle Landau, daughter of Michelle Branch and husband Teddy Landau
- August 11 – FloyyMenor, Chilean singer and songwriter
- September 14 – Sean Preston Federline, son of Britney Spears and Kevin Federline
- September 24 – Aiden Michael Bice, son of Bo Bice and wife Caroline Fisher.
- September 28 - Sienna Spiro, British singer-songwriter
- November 3 - Lara Raj, American singer, dancer, actress and member of Katseye

== Deaths ==
=== January–February ===
- January 5 – Danny Sugerman, American talent manager, 50
- January 11
  - Spencer Dryden, American drummer of Jefferson Airplane, 61
  - Jimmy Griffin, co-founder of Bread, 61
  - Miriam Hyde, Australian composer, 91
- January 15 – Victoria de los Ángeles, Catalan soprano, 81
- January 20 – Solomon King, American pop singer, 74
- January 21 – Kaljo Raid, Estonian cellist and composer, 83
- January 22 – Consuelo Velázquez, Mexican singer-songwriter and pianist, 88
- January 24 – June Bronhill, Australian soprano, 75
- January 25 – Ray Peterson, pop singer, 65
- January 28 – Jim Capaldi, British drummer and vocalist, 60
- January 29 – Eric Griffiths, guitarist (The Quarrymen), 64
- January 30 – Martyn Bennett, Scottish bagpiper, 33 (cancer)
- February 1 – Franco Mannino, Italian composer, 80
- February 3
  - David Hönigsberg, composer and conductor, 45
  - Andreas Makris, Greek-American violinist and composer, 74
- February 6 – Merle Kilgore, singer-songwriter, 70
- February 8
  - Helmut Eder, Austrian composer, 88
  - Keith Knudsen, drummer (The Doobie Brothers), 56
  - Jimmy Smith, American jazz organist, 77
- February 9 – Tyrone Davis, American soul singer, 66
- February 12 – Sammi Smith, American singer-songwriter, 61
- February 13 – Sixten Ehrling, Swedish conductor, 86
- February 16 – Marcello Viotti, Swiss conductor, 50 (stroke)
- February 25 – Edward Patten, R&B/soul singer (Gladys Knight & the Pips), 65
- February 28 – Chris Curtis, British drummer and vocalist, 63
- February 28 - Phil Fuemana, New Zealand vocalist OMC, 41

=== March–April ===
- March 4 – Una Hale, soprano, 82
- March 6 – Tommy Vance, DJ, 63
- March 9
  - Chris LeDoux, country music singer, 56
  - Kathie Kay, big band singer, 86
- March 10 – Danny Joe Brown, lead singer of Molly Hatchet, 53 (kidney failure)
- March 13 – Lyn Collins, soul singer, 56
- March 16 – Justin Hinds, Jamaican ska vocalist, 62
- March 16 – Vassar Clements, fiddler, 76
- March 21
  - Stanley Sadie, musicologist 74
  - Bobby Short, cabaret singer, 80
- March 22 – Rod Price, guitarist, 57 (Foghat)
- March 26 – Paul Hester, drummer for Crowded House and Split Enz, 46 (suicide)
- March 27
  - Grant Johannesen, pianist, 83
  - Rigo Tovar, Mexican singer and composer, 58
- March 28 – Moura Lympany, pianist, 88
- March 30 – Derrick Plourde, drummer (Lagwagon and the Ataris), 33 (suicide)
- April 2 – Alexander Brott, conductor and composer, 90
- April 7 – Grigoris Bithikotsis, Greek singer, 82
- April 10 – Norbert Brainin, Austrian violinist, 82
- April 11 – Jerry Byrd, lap steel guitarist, 85
- April 12 – Ehud Manor, Israeli songwriter, 63
- April 13 – Johnnie Johnson, American pianist, 80
- April 14 – John Fred, pop singer, 64
- April 18 – Kenneth Schermerhorn, conductor, 75
- April 19
  - Bryan Ottoson, guitarist of American Head Charge, 27 (overdose)
  - Niels-Henning Ørsted Pedersen, Danish jazz bassist, 58
- April 21 – Cyril Tawney, traditional singer, 74
- April 23 – Robert Farnon, composer, arranger, 87
- April 25 – Hasil Adkins, American rockabilly musician, 67
- April 28 – Percy Heath, jazz musician, 81

=== May–June ===
- May 8 – Nasrat Parsa, Afghan singer, 36 (murdered)
- May 10 – David Wayne, former singer of Metal Church, 47 (injuries resulting from car crash)
- May 11 – Michalis Genitsaris, Greek singer-songwriter, 87
- May 12 – Frankie LaRocka, rock drummer and producer, 51
- May 14 – Jimmy Martin, bluegrass musician, 77
- May 22 – Thurl Ravenscroft, US singer, 91
- May 25
  - Ruth Laredo, pianist, 67
  - Domenic Troiano, guitarist The Guess Who, 59
- May 29
  - Oscar Brown, jazz singer-songwriter, 78
  - George Rochberg, composer, 86
- June 13 – David Diamond, American composer, 89
- June 14 – Carlo Maria Giulini, conductor, 91
- June 17 – Karl Mueller, American bassist of Soul Asylum, 41
- June 21 – Grete Sultan, German-born American pianist, 99
- June 29 – Mikkel Flagstad, Norwegian saxophonist, 75
- June 30 – Clancy Eccles, ska/reggae singer, 64 (complications after heart attack)

=== July–August ===
- July 1
  - Luther Vandross, R&B singer, 54
  - Renaldo "Obie" Benson, R&B/soul singer (Four Tops), 69
- July 5
  - Ray "Stingray" Davis, bassist (Parliament-Funkadelic), 65
  - Shirley Goodman, American singer (Shirley & Company), 69
- July 6 – Richard Verreau, operatictenor, 79
- July 7 – Henri Betti, French composer and pianist, 87
- July 11 – Frances Langford, US singer and actress, 91
- July 14 – Michael Dahlquist, drummer (Silkworm), 39 (car crash)
- July 17 – Laurel Aitken, ska singer, heart attack, 78
- July 18 – John Herald songwriter, musician, member of The Greenbriar Boys, 65
- July 21 – Long John Baldry, R&B singer, 64
- July 22 – Eugene Record, singer (The Chi-Lites), 64
- July 23 – Myron Floren, accordionist, 85
- July 27 – Robert Wright, songwriter, 90
- July 29 – Hildegarde, US singer, 99
- August 1 – Al Aronowitz, American music journalist, 77
- August 4 – Little Milton, blues musician, 70
- August 6
  - Ibrahim Ferrer, Afro-Cuban singer, 78
  - Carlo Little, British studio musician, drummer, 67
- August 13 – Arnold Cooke, British composer, 98
- August 16 – Vassar Clements, fiddler, 77
- August 21 – Robert Moog, electronic music pioneer, 71
- August 22 – Luc Ferrari, composer, 76
- August 26 – Denis D'Amour, guitarist of Voivod, 45

=== September–October ===
- September 1
  - R. L. Burnside, blues musician, 78
  - Barry Cowsill, member of The Cowsills (ruled to have drowned during Hurricane Katrina, date of death approximate), 50
- September 10 – Clarence "Gatemouth" Brown, blues musician, 81
- September 15
  - Jeronimas Kačinskas, Lithuanian-born composer and conductor, 98
  - Sidney Luft, ex-husband of Judy Garland, father of Lorna Luft, and producer of A Star Is Born, 89
- September 17 – Alfred Reed, American composer of concert band music, 84
- September 18
  - Joel Hirschhorn, American songwriter, 66
- September 19
  - Willie Hutch, singer, songwriter and producer, 60
  - William Vacchiano, trumpet player, 93
- October 1 – Paul Pena, singer, songwriter and guitarist, 55
- October 2 – Hamilton Camp, singer, songwriter and actor, 70
- October 10 – Nick Hawkins, guitarist (Big Audio Dynamite II), 40
- October 12 – Baker Knight, songwriter and musician, 72
- October 16 - David Reilly, singer, songwriter and programmer (God Lives Underwater), 34
- October 18 – Marshall Rohner, guitarist for T.S.O.L., The Cruzados, 42
- October 19 – Ryan "Dallas" Cook, American trombonist (Suburban Legends), 23 (road accident)
- October 20 – Shirley Horn, jazz singer and pianist, 71
- October 22 – Franky Gee (Captain Jack), 43 (cerebral haemorrhage)
- October 31 – John "Beatz" Holohan, drummer for Bayside, 31 (road accident)

=== November–December ===
- November 4 – Mana Nishiura, drummer (Shonen Knife, DMBQ), 34 (car accident)
- November 5 – Link Wray, rock and roll guitarist and singer, 76
- November 6 – Minako Honda, Japanese singer, 38 (leukemia)
- November 10 – Gardner Read, American composer, 92
- November 20
  - Fritz Richmond, jug and washtub bass musician, 66
  - Chris Whitley, singer-songwriter, 45 (lung cancer)
- November 26
  - Mark Craney, drummer (Jethro Tull, Jean-Luc Ponty), 53
  - Joe Jones, 79
- November 28 – Tony Meehan, former drummer of The Shadows, 62
- November 29 – Deon van der Walt, tenor, 47 (shot)
- December 8 – Danny Williams, singer, 63
- December 9
  - Mike Botts, drummer, 61
  - György Sándor, Hungarian pianist, 93
- December 14 – Gordon Duncan, bagpiper and composer, 41
- December 24 – Constance Keene, American pianist, 84
- December 25
  - Derek Bailey, guitarist, 75
  - Birgit Nilsson, Swedish soprano, 87

== Awards ==
- ARIA Music Awards of 2005
- 2005 BRIT Awards
- 2005 Country Music Association Awards
- Eurovision Song Contest 2005
- Grammy Awards of 2005
- Junior Eurovision Song Contest 2005
- Juno Awards of 2005
- Mercury Prize 2005
- Triple J Hottest 100, 2005

== See also ==
- 2005 in British music
- 2005 in country music
- 2005 in Swiss music
- 2005 in heavy metal music
