= Entre nous =

Entre nous may refer to:

== Music ==
=== Albums ===
- Entre nous, by Chimène Badi, or the title song, 2003
- Entre nous, by Diane Tell, or the title song, 1979
- Entre nous, by Jill Barber, or the title song, 2018
- Entre nous, by Liane Foly, or the title song, 2001
- Entre Nous, by Louis Chedid, or the title song, 1994

=== Songs ===
- "Entre Nous", by Charles Aznavour on the album Entre Deux Rêves, 1967
- "Entre nous" (Chimène Badi song), on the album of the same name, 2003
- "Entre Nous", by Dan Avidan and Super Guitar Bros., on the album Dan Avidan & Super Guitar Bros. III, 2025
- "Entre nous", by Diane Tell, on the album of the same name, 1979
- "Entre nous", by Jill Barber, on the album of the same name, 2018
- "Entre nous", by Liane Foly, on the album of the same name, 2001
- "Entre Nous", by Louis Chedid, on the album of the same name, 1994
- "Entre Nous" (Rush song), on the album Permanent Waves, 1980

== Other uses ==
- Entre Nous (film), 1983
- Entre Nous (journal), a World Health Organization magazine on sexual and reproductive health
- Entre Nous: Between the World Cup and Me, a book by Grant Farred, 2019
