= Chiquitas (song) =

Single by Ilona Mitrecey

from the album Laissez-nous respirer
- Released: April 2007
- Genre: Pop
- Label: M6 Interactions / Scorpio Music (Universal Music Group)
- Songwriter(s): Rosario Castagnola, Laurent Jeanne, Mixivan

Ilona Mitrecey singles chronology
"Laissez-nous respirer" (2006)	"Chiquitas" (2007)

Music video
- "Chiquitas" (audio only) on YouTube

"Chiquitas" is a song by French singer Ilona Mitrecey from her second album Laissez-nous respirer. It was the album's second track and it was released as its second single. The single came out around four months after the album, in April 2007, and debuted at number 15 in France, peaking at number 13 the next week.

== Charts ==
Chart (2007)	Peak position
France (SNEP)	13
