= Laissez-nous respirer (song) =

Single by Ilona Mitrecey

from the album Laissez-nous respirer
- Released: December 2006
- Genre: Pop
- Label: M6 Interactions / Scorpio Music (Universal Music Group)
- Songwriter(s): Laurent Jeanne, Dan Mitrecey, Philippe Pelet, Olivier Perrot

Ilona Mitrecey singles chronology
"Allô, allô" (2006)	"Laissez-nous respirer" (2006)	"Chiquitas" (2007)

Music video
- "Laissez-nous respirer" (audio only) on YouTube

"Laissez-nous respirer" is a song by French singer Ilona Mitrecey from her second album Laissez-nous respirer. It was the album's opening track and it was released as its first single. The single came out simultaneously with the album in December 2006 and debuted at number 20 in France, then peaking at number 16 for two weeks.

== Charts ==
Chart (2006–2007)	Peak position
Belgium (Ultratip Bubbling Under Wallonia)	3
France (SNEP)	16
