= Un monde parfait (album) =

Un Monde Parfait

Studio album by Ilona
- Released: 10 October 2005
- Recorded: 2004–2005
- Genre: Dance
- Length: 39:41
- Language: French, Italian, English, German
- Label: Sony BMG Music
- Producer: Ivan Russo, Laurent Jeanne, Philippe Pelet, Dan Mitrecey, Oliver Perrot

Ilona chronology
Un Monde Parfait (2005)	Laissez-nous respirer (2006)

Singles from Un Monde parfait
- 1. "Un Monde parfait" Released: February 2005; 2. "C'est les vacances" Released: July 2005; 3. "Dans ma fusée" Released: October 17, 2005; 4. "Noël, que du bonheur" Released: December 2005; 5. "Allô, Allô" Released: April 2006

Professional ratings
Review scores
Source	Rating
Kommersant (Russia)	Favorable

Un Monde Parfait was the debut album from the French singer Ilona Mitrecey and was released on 10 August 2005 by Sony BMG. In Germany and Switzerland, it was composed of only six tracks from the French version and was reentitled Ilona there. The album reached number two in France, Mitrecey's country-home, and Portugal, and number nine in the Francophone part of Belgium. It provided five singles which were all top ten hits in France, the eponymous and lead single even becoming the best-selling single of the 21st century in the country, with over 1.5 million copies sold.

== Chart performance ==
On the French SNEP Albums Chart, Un Monde parfait went straight to number two on 15 October, which was its peak position, and remained on the chart for 58 weeks. It was the 34th best-selling album in 2005, with 178,454 copies sold, and the 130th in 2006, with a total of 257,100 sales, and achieved double gold status. On the Portuguese Albums Chart, it stayed for 25 weeks from 12/2006 to 38/2006 and reached number two for three weeks.

== Track listings ==
=== Worldwide : Un Monde parfait ===
1. "Un Monde parfait" — 3:07
2. "C'est les vacances" — 3:49
3. "Dans ma fusée" — 3:53
4. "Noël, que du bonheur" — 3:22
5. "Retourner à l'école" — 3:17
6. "Allô Allô" — 2:49
7. "My Saxophone" — 3:03
8. "MDR :-)" — 1:18
9. "Sport d'hiver" — 3:05
10. "Bye Bye Collège" — 3:11
11. "C'est la fête" — 3:21
12. "Arrivederci à bientôt" — 1:45
13. "Un Monde parfait" (72 remix) — 3:41

=== Germany and Switzerland : Ilona ===
1. "Un Monde parfait" — 3:47
2. "C'est les vacances" — 3:50
3. "Sport d'hiver" — 3:06
4. "Allô, allô" — 2:49
5. "Retourner à l'école" — 3:16
6. "My Saxophone" — 3:02
7. "Un Monde parfait" (karaoke version) — 3:45
8. "Un Monde parfait" (video)

== Charts ==
=== Weekly charts ===
Chart (2005–06)	Peak position
Belgian (Wallonia) Albums Chart	9
French Digital Chart	6
French SNEP Albums Chart	2
Portuguese Albums Chart	2
Swiss Albums Chart ^{1}	31

^{1} Released under the title Ilona

=== Year-end charts ===
Chart (2005)	Position
Belgium (Wallonia) Albums Chart	46
French Albums Chart	34

Chart (2006)	Position
French Albums Chart	130

== Certifications and sales ==
Country	Certification	Date	Sales certified	Physical sales
Belgium	Platinum	2006	50,000	
France	2 x Gold	December 14, 2005	200,000	257,100
Portugal	Platinum	2006	20,000	
