= Noël, que du bonheur =

Single by Ilona Mitrecey

Single by Ilona

from the album Un monde parfait
- Released: December 2005
- Recorded: France
- Genre: Eurodance
- Length: 3:22
- Label: Sony MBG Music / Scorpio Music
- Songwriters: Laurent Jeanne, Dan Mitrecey, Philippe Pelet, Olivier Perrot

Ilona singles chronology
| "Dans ma fusée" (2005) | "Noël, que du bonheur" (2005) | "Allô, allô" (2006) |

"Noël, que du bonheur" (English: "Christmas, Only Happiness") is a 2005 song recorded by the French singer Ilona. It was the fourth single from her first album Un monde parfait and was released in the first days of December 2005. As the title suggests it, it is a Christmas song and it hit the top ten in France and Belgium (Wallonia).

== Lyrics and music ==
"Noël, que du bonheur" was composed by Laurent Jeanne, Philippe Pelet, Olivier Perrot and Dan Mitrecey. Unlike the three previous singles, it was not released as a CD maxi.

An acoustic version is available on the second album of Ilona, Laissez-nous respirer.

== Chart performance ==
In France, "Noël, que du bonheur" debuted at a peak of number five on 10 December 2005, selling about 21,500 units that week. The next two weeks, the single ranked at number six with 21,472 and 37,680 sales, respectively. Then it did not stop to drop and fell off the chart after twelve weeks. On 31 December, the Syndicat National de l'Édition Phonographique certified the single Silver disc. The song was the 84th best-selling single of 2005, and the 87th best-selling singles during the first quarter of 2006. In the Wallonia region of Belgium, it entered the Ultratop 40 at number 26 on 24 December 2005, jumped to number ten the following week, then dropped and remained for five weeks on the chart.

== Track listings ==
CD single - France

| No. | Title | Length |
|---|---|---|
| 1. | "Noël, que du bonheur" | 3:20 |
| 2. | "Noël, que du bonheur" (choral version) | 3:20 |

Digital download

| No. | Title | Length |
|---|---|---|
| 1. | "Noël, que du bonheur" | 3:20 |
| 2. | "Noël, que du bonheur" (choral version) | 3:20 |
| 3. | "Noël, que du bonheur" (acoustic version) | 2:49 |

== Credits and personnel ==
- Produced by Ivan Russo, Laurent Jeanne, Philippe Pelet, Dan Mitrecey and Olivier Perrot
- Lead vocal : Ilona
- Choirs by The Ilonettes : Lena Nester, Rokhya-Lucie Dieng, Sophie Lemoine
- Additional choirs : Noémie Brosset, Maïlis Mitrecey
- Synth : Philippe Pelet, Ivan Russo, Laurent Jeanne, Damydee
- Accordion : Ivan Russo
- Additional production : Ivan Russo and Domydee at Atollorecording Studio (Naples)
- Executive production assistance : Gilles Caballero, Roxanne Perrot
- All vocals recorded by Philippe Vandenhende
  - At Moneypenny Studio (Paris) with Franck Benhamou and Benoît Cinquin
  - At Ty-Houam Studio (Préfailles) with Gilles Caballero
- Mixed and mastered by Ivan Russo at Atollorecording Studio (Naples)

== Charts ==
=== Weekly charts ===
Weekly charts for "Noël, que du bonheur"
| Chart (2005) | Peak position |
| Belgium (Ultratop 50 Wallonia) | 10 |
| Europe (Eurochart Hot 100 Singles) | 21 |
| France (SNEP) | 5 |

=== Year-end charts ===
Year-end charts for "Noël, que du bonheur"
| Chart (2005) | Position |
|---|---|
| France (SNEP) | 84 |

== Certifications and sales ==
Certifications for "Noël, que du bonheur"
| Region | Certification | Certified units/sales |
|---|---|---|
| France (SNEP) | Silver | 100,000^{*} |
^{*} Sales figures based on certification alone.
