= Sandra Esparon =

Seychellois singer and music performer

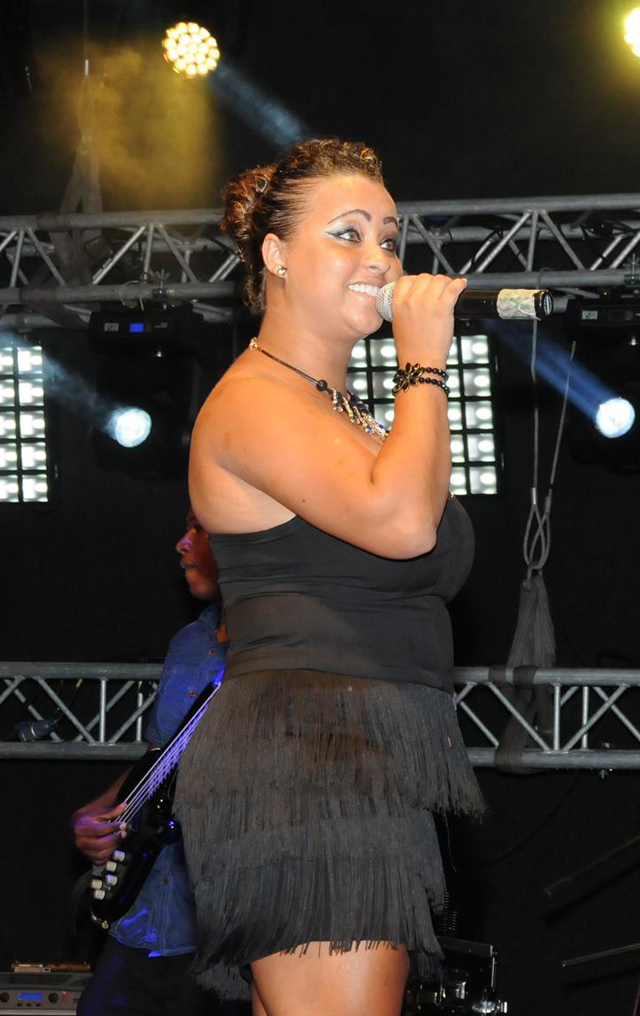
- Sandra Esparon performing at the Cable Tunes Music Awards 2014 ceremony.

Background information
- Born: Sandra Esparon; May 15, 1989 (age 37); Takamaka, Mahé, Seychelles
- Genres: Creole; zouk; ragga
- Occupations: Singer-songwriter; vocalist
- Instrument: Vocals
- Years active: 2003–present
- Member of: Dezil'

Sandra Esparon (born May 15, 1989) is a Seychellois singer and music performer. She voiced vocals in the 2005 hit single "San ou (La Rivière)" as a member of Seychellois music band Dezil'. Her career has seen her release three studio albums and receive multiple awards both locally and internationally.

== Life and career ==
Esparon was born on May 15, 1989, in Takamaka district of Mahé, Seychelles. She began her professional music career as a member of Dezil'. In 2012, she released her second album titled Sandra Fanm Inik which won her Best Female Artist of the Year at the 2012 Seychelles Airtel Music Awards and in 2014, she released Mon Santiman. In 2014, she won Best Female Artist at the 2014 Seychelles Airtel Music Award and 5th Cable Tunes Awards respectively.

== Awards and recognitions ==
Year	Award ceremony	Prize	Result	Ref.
2012	2012 Airtel Music Awards	Best Female Artist	Won	
2014	5th Cable Tunes Award	Best Female Artist	Won	
2014	2014 Airtel Music Awards	Best Female Artist	Won	
2014	2014 Airtel Music Awards	Best Duet	Won	
2014	2014 Airtel Music Awards	Best Traditional Song	Won	
2014	5th Les Voix de l'Océan Indien	Seychelles Best Artist	Won	
2015	6th Les Voix de l'Océan Indien	Best Artist of the Indian Ocean	Won	
