= Dans ma fusée =

Single by Ilona

from the album Un monde parfait
- Released: 17 October 2005
- Recorded: Paris, Préfailles (France); Naples (Italy)
- Genre: Eurodance
- Length: 3:51
- Label: Sony BMG Music
- Songwriters: Domydee, Laurent Jeanne, Mixivan
- Producers: Domydee, Ivan Russo

Ilona singles chronology
"C'est les vacances" (2005)	"Dans ma fusée" (2005)	"Noël, que du bonheur" (2005)

"Dans ma fusée" ("In my Rocket") is a 2005 song recorded by the French singer Ilona. It was the third single from her debut album Un monde parfait and was released on 17 October 2005. It was less successful as the two previous singles, but was after all a hit in France where it peaked at number three.

== Background and lyrics ==
The song was composed in Italy and in France by Laurent Jeanne, Mixivan and Domydee and produced by Ivan Russo. Maïlis Mitrecey, Ilona's sister, participated in the background vocals. In the song, Ilona explains she likes to travel in her rocket and mentions various stars and planets.

As for the previous two singles, the music video was produced as an animated feature in which the singer appears a few seconds, on a giant screen, at the beginning. This video was also included on the DVD Un monde parfait. A CD maxi, only released in limited edition, was edited by Atollo, on 9 December 2005, about two months after the single release, but only available in limited edition.

The song was covered in Chinese-language by the band The Flowers (花儿乐队) under the title "Yêu hành tây" (愛上洋蔥) as third track on its album Flower Age Pageant, released on 28 September 2007.

== Chart performance ==
In France, "Dans ma fusée" entered the singles chart at a peak of number three on 22 October 2005, selling 17,187 units, before dropping (then number six, with 15,704 sales; number seven, with 14,230 sales; number eight, with 13,839 sales). It totaled four weeks in the top ten, 14 weeks in the top 50, 21 weeks in the top 100. "Dans ma fusée" was the 77th best-selling singles during the first quarter of 2006 (from 1 January to 31 March 2006) and was certified Silver disc. It ranked at number 54 on the year-end chart.

On the Belgium (Wallonia) Ultratop 40 Singles Chart, "Dans ma fusée" debuted at number 36 on 5 November 2005, reached a peak at number 13 two weeks later, and remained on the chart for nine weeks. In Switzerland, it peaked at number 34 in its third week, on 1 January 2006.

== Track listings ==
- CD single - France (Scorpio / Sony)

No.	Title	Length
1.	"Dans ma fusée"	3:53
2.	"Dans ma fusée" (instrumental)	3:49

- Digital download

No.	Title	Length
1.	"Dans ma fusée"	3:53
2.	"Dans ma fusée" (instrumental)	3:49

- CD maxi (Atollo)

No.	Title	Length
1.	"Dans ma fusée" (edit)	3:49
2.	"Dans ma fusée" (instrumental)	3:49
3.	"Dans ma fusée" (remix - extended version)	5:32
4.	"Dans ma fusée" (video)	3:49

== Credits and personnel ==
- Vocal : Ilona
- Music / Text : Domydee, Laurent Jeanne, Mixivan
- Producer : Domydee, Ivan Russo
- Voice at beginning : Houston One
- Chorus : Lena Nester, Rokhya-Lucie Dieng, Sophie Lemoine
- Additional chorus : Domydee, Noémie Brosset, Maïlis Mitrecey
- Acoustic guitars : Rosario Castagnola
- Bass : Ivan Russo
- Synthesizer and keyboards : Ivan Russo
- Accordion : Ivan Russo
- Arrangements : Ivan Russo and Domydee
- Voice recording : Philippe Vandenhende
- Mixing : Ivan Russo
- Recording at Atollorecording Studio in Naples, Italy, at Moneypenny Studio in Paris, France, with Franck Benhamou and Benoît Cinquin, and at Ty-Houam Studio in Préfailles, France, with Gilles Caballero

== Charts ==
=== Weekly charts ===
Weekly charts for "Dans ma fusée"
Chart (2005)	Peak position
Belgium (Ultratop 50 Wallonia)	13
Europe (European Hot 100 Singles)	13
France (SNEP)	3
Switzerland (Schweizer Hitparade)	34

=== Year-end charts ===
Year-end charts for "Dans ma fusée"
Chart (2005)	Position
France (SNEP)	54

== Certifications ==
Certifications for "Dans ma fusée"
Region	Certification	Certified units/sales
France (SNEP)	Silver	100,000^{*}
^{*} Sales figures based on certification alone.

== Release history ==
Release history for "Dans ma fusée"
Region	Date	Format	Label
Belgium, France, Switzerland	17 October 2005	CD single	Scorpio
Belgium, France, Switzerland	15 December 2005	CD maxi	Atollo
