= Allô, allô =

Single by Ilona

from the album Un Monde parfait
- Released: April 2006
- Recorded: Paris (France); Naples (Italy)
- Genre: Eurodance
- Length: 2:48
- Label: Sony Bmg Music
- Songwriter(s): Laurent Jeanne, Dan Mitrecey, Philippe Pelet, Olivier Perrot
- Producer(s): Atollo, Moneypenny

Ilona singles chronology
"Noël, que du bonheur" (2005)	"Allô, allô" (2006)	"Laissez-nous respirer" (2007)

"Allô, allô" ("Hello, Hello") is a 2005 song recorded by French singer Ilona. It was the fifth and last single from her debut album Un Monde Parfait and was released in the first days of April 2006. It had much less success than the previous four singles, but it managed to reach the top ten in France.

== Lyrics and music ==
The lyrics were written and the music composed by Laurent Jeanne, Dan Mitrecey, Philippe Pelet and Olivier Perrot. The song is about the social networking opportunities and convenience brought to the singer's life by her mobile telephone. In the song, Ilona enumerates eight first names of girls who apparently are her friends. However, in an interview, Ilona said that the song is not autobiographical and that she doesn't know girls with such first names.

== Chart performances ==
In France, "Allô, allô" entered the singles chart at #11 on April 8, 2006, then peaked at #10 for two successive weeks. It almost kept on dropping on the chart, totalling 12 weeks in the top 50 and 21 weeks on the chart (top 100). It allowed Ilona to obtain her fifth top ten hit from an album, which was quite rare in France. "Allô, allô" was the 79th best-selling single of 2006 in France.

In Belgium (Wallonia), the single was low charted, peaking at #35 for two weeks (on May 6 and June 3, 2006) and staying in the top 40 for four weeks.

== Track listings ==
CD single - France

No.	Title	Length
1.	"Allô, allô" (original version)	2:48
2.	"Allô, allô" (remix club edit mix)	2:40

Digital download

No.	Title	Length
1.	"Allô, allô" (original version)	2:48
2.	"Allô, allô" (remix club edit mix)	2:40

== Credits and personnel ==
- Composers: Laurent Jeanne, Dan Mitrecey, Philippe Pelet and Olivier Perrot
- Editions: Moneypenny, Atello and Universal Music Italia
- Production: Ivan Russo, Laurent Jeanne, Philippe Pelet, Dan Mitrecey, Olivier Perrot
- Vocals: Ilona
- Background vocals: "The Ilonettes": Lena Nester, Rokhya-Lucie Dieng, Sophie Lemoine
- Additionnel background vocals: Noémie Brosset, Maïlis Mitrecey
- Vocal box: Roxane Perrot
- Synths: Philippe Pelet, Ivan Russo
- Additionnel production: Ivan Russo & Domydee at Atollorecording Studio (Naples)
- Executive production: Gilles Caballero and Roxane Perrot
- Voices recording: Philippe Vandenhende at Moneypenny Studio (Paris) with Franck Benhamou and Benoît Cinquin, and at Ty-Houarn Studio (Préfailles) with Gilles Caballero
- Mixing: Ivan Russo at Atollorecording Studio (Naples)
- Remixed by Laurent Pautrat (Clap Production / Pool e Music) for Scorpio Music

== Charts ==
Chart (2006)	Peak position
Belgian (Wallonia) Singles Chart	35
Eurochart Hot 100	35
French SNEP Singles Chart	10

End of year chart (2006)	Position
French Singles Chart	79
