= Ma vérité =

Studio album by Johnny Hallyday
- Released: 6 November 2005
- Recorded: France, 2005
- Genre: Rock
- Labels: Mercury, Universal Music

Johnny Hallyday chronology
Parc des Princes 2003 (2003)	Ma vérité (2005)	Flashback Tour - Palais des Sports 2006 (2006)

Singles from Ma Vérité
- 1. "Ma religion dans son regard" Released: 24 October 2005; 2. "Mon Plus Beau Noël" Released: 5 December 2005; 3. "Le temps passe" Released: 12 March 2006; 4. "La paix" Released: 6 June 2006

Ma vérité is a 2005 album recorded by French singer Johnny Hallyday. It was released on 6 November 2005, and achieved huge success in France and Belgium (Wallonia), where it topped the charts. It provided three top ten singles in France : "Ma religion dans son regard" (#2), "Mon Plus Beau Noël" (#1) and "Le temps passe" (#4). French acts Kyo, Zazie, Passi and Stomy Bugsy participated in the composition of several tracks of the album.

== Track listing ==
1. "S'il n'est pas trop tard" (Jérôme Attal, Daran) — 3:06
2. "Ma religion dans son regard" (Benoit Poher, Kyo) — 3:50
3. "La Paix" (Zazie, Fabien Cahen) — 3:23
4. "Le temps passe" (Passi, Stomy Bugsy, Elio) (with Ministère A.M.E.R.) — 4:40
5. "Si tu pars" (Yanne) — 4:06
6. "Clémence" (Guillaume Ledoux, Johan Ledoux) — 3:27
7. "Ce qui ne tue pas nous rend plus fort" (Guy Carlier, Fred Blondin) — 3:17
8. "Mon plus beau Noël" (Fred Blondin) — 4:22
9. "Te savoir près de moi" ( J.Jaillet, A.L Vaissière, A.Auclair) — 3:53
10. "Ma vérité" (David Salsedo) — 3:15
11. "Elle s'en moque" (Muriel Robin, Cyril Assous) — 4:01
12. "Affronte-moi" (François Welgrin, David Hallyday) — 3:36
13. "Apprendre à aimer" ( Johnny Hallyday, Michel Mallory) — 4:21

Source : Allmusic.

== Releases ==
Date	Label	Country	Format	Catalog
November 6, 2005	Mercury	Belgium, France, Switzerland	CD	98337905
2006	Mercury	Belgium, France, Switzerland	CD	983414

== Certifications and sales ==
Country	Certification	Date	Sales certified	Physical sales
Belgium	Platinum	January 21, 2006	50,000	
France	Diamond	December 20, 2006	750,000	791,500
Switzerland	Gold	2005	20,000	

== Charts ==
=== Weekly charts ===
Chart (2005/06)	Peak position
Belgian (Wallonia) Albums Chart	1
French SNEP Albums Chart	1
Swiss Albums Chart	5

=== Year-end charts ===
Chart (2005)	Position
Belgian (Wallonia) Albums Chart	6
French Albums Chart	2
Chart (2006)	Position
Belgian (Wallonia) Albums Chart	70
French Albums Chart	58
