= Grant Farred =

South African sociologist

Grant Farred is a South African sociologist who is professor of Africana Studies and English at Cornell University. He has previously taught at Williams College, the University of Michigan, and Duke University. He has written several books, served for eight years as editor of South Atlantic Quarterly, and is a leading figure in contemporary African-American Studies, Cultural Studies, and Postcolonial Studies.

== Early life and education ==
Farred received a B.A. from the University of the Western Cape in 1987 and an Honours B.A. from the same institution in 1988; an M.A. from Columbia University in 1990; and a PhD from Princeton in 1997. At Columbia, he studied under Edward Said, whom he has described as his mentor and as "a model for being engaged in political activities outside the university."

He received a Fulbright fellowship in 1989, was a Du Bois-Rodney-Mandela Fellow at the Center for Afroamerican and African Studies at the University of Michigan in 1994–1995, and was a fellow of the John Hope Franklin Center at Duke in 2002–2003.

== South Atlantic Quarterly ==
Farred was editor of the South Atlantic Quarterly from 2002 to 2010. When he left this position, he was described as having "widened the journal's theoretical and geographic scope while keeping it rooted in its long history of political engagement." In a discussion of the history of the journal with current editor Michael Hardt, Farred called his editorship of SAQ "the most important political thing I have done in this country in the twenty-one years I've been here." During his tenure, SAQ published special issues entitled "Palestine America," "Racial Americana," and "Ambushed: A Critique of Machtpolitik." Farred also edited a special issue marking the fiftieth anniversary of the publication of Frantz Fanon's The Wretched of the Earth. "This issue," according to the publisher, "revitalizes Fanon's canonical status as Third World theorist by asserting that the main imperatives of Fanon's work remain as urgent as ever: combating the psychic and physical violence of colonialism, achieving real forms of liberation for colonized peoples, and ending the degradation of people of color."

== Books ==
Farred's books include What's My Name? Black Vernacular Intellectuals (2003), Midfielder's Moment: Coloured Literature and Culture in Contemporary South Africa (1999), Phantom Calls: Race and the Globalization of the NBA (2006), Long Distance Love: A Passion for Football (2008), and In Motion, At Rest: The Event of the Athletic Body (2014). Farred also edited Rethinking CLR James (1996).

The subject of Farred's short 2006 book Phantom Calls: Race and the Globalization of the NBA is described by its publisher as follows: "After a recent playoff loss, Houston head coach Jeff Van Gundy alleged that Yao Ming, his Chinese star center, was the victim of phantom calls, or refereeing decisions that may have been ethnically biased. Grant Farred here shows how this incident can be seen as a pivotal moment in the globalization of the NBA. With some forty percent of its players coming from foreign nations, the idea of race in the NBA has become increasingly multifaceted. Farred explains how allegations of phantom calls such as Van Gundy's challenge the fiction that America is a post-racial society and compel us to think in new ways about the nexus of race and racism in America."

Farred's 2008 book Long Distance Love: A Passion for Football describes "how 'football' opened up the world to a young boy growing up disenfranchised in apartheid South Africa. For Farred, being a soccer fan enabled him to establish connections with events and people throughout history and from around the globe: from the Spanish Civil War to the atrocities of the Argentine dictatorship of the 1970s and '80s, and from the experience of racism under apartheid to the experience of watching his beloved Liverpool team play on English soil."

Farred most recent book, In Motion, At Rest: The Event of the Athletic Body (2014), examines the "infamous events" of basketball player Ron Artest and footballers Eric Cantona and Zinedine Zidane, arguing that "theorizing the event through sport makes possible an entirely original way of thinking about it. He shows how what was inherent in the event is opened to new possibilities for understanding ontological being by thinking about sport philosophically.

== Theorizing Black Studies: Thinking Black Intellectuals ==
An article by Lawrence Lan that appeared in the Cornell Sun on 12 April 2010, noted that Farred had "invited two female graduate students to attend a conference at the University of Rochester entitled 'Theorizing Black Studies: Thinking Black Intellectuals.'" After the two students arrived late for one panel at the conference, Farred said to them: "When you both walked in, I thought, 'Who are these black bitches?'", They told him that they found the comment offensive, and he apologised.
