= 2005 in rock music =

This article summarizes the events related to rock music for the year of 2005.

== Notable events ==
=== January ===
- A number of high profile rock albums from 2004 continue to chart in the top ten of the US Billboard 200 all-format albums chart, including Green Day's American Idiot and U2's How to Dismantle an Atomic Bomb. Despite its September 2004 release, American Idiot eventually rises to top the chart for 2 consecutive weeks in late January.
- Green Day's single "Boulevard of Broken Dreams" starts its fourteen consecutive weeks atop the US Billboard Mainstream Rock Songs chart. The song finds crossover success as well, eventually peaking as number 2 on the Billboard Hot 100 chart.
- Feeder releases their fifth studio album, Pushing the Senses. The album debuts at a career-high number 2 on the national UK albums chart, though critical reception is mixed, with some criticizing the band's temporary move to a more piano-based, Coldplay influenced sound.

=== February ===
- The remaining members of Alice in Chains reform for the first time in 9 years - and the first time following the 2002 death of origianal frontman Layne Staley - for a benefit concert for victims of the 2004 Indian Ocean earthquake and tsunami. The show featured a variety of musicians filling in on vocals for Staley - Maynard James Keenan of Tool, Wes Scantlin of Puddle of Mudd and Ann Wilson of Heart. The show eventually inspires the band to find a new vocals and continue the band, with their search ending with filling the role with William DuVall the following year.
- English rock band Bloc Party releases their debut studio album, Silent Alarm. It peaks at number 3 on the UK and Ireland all-format albums charts, and performs well critically, making many "best of the year" album lists.
- English indie rock band Doves release their third studio album, Some Cities. The album tops the UK all-format albums chart.
- 3 Doors Down - releases their third studio album, Seventeen Days. It debuts at number one on the Billboard 200 chart, their first of two albums to do so, along with their next release, 3 Doors Down (2008).

=== March ===
- Queens of the Stone Age release their fourth studio album, Lullabies to Paralyze. It debuts at number 5 on the Billboard 200 chart, selling 97,000 copies in its opening week. It also charted in the top 10 of over 15 other countries as well.

=== April ===
- Audioslave single "Be Yourself" starts its 7 consecutive weeks atop of the Billboard Mainstream Rock Chart. It later finds crossover success, peaking at 33 on the Billboard Hot 100 chart.
- Rob Thomas, frontman of alternative rock band Matchbox 20, releases his debut solo album ...Something to Be. The album takes a more pop rock direction than his work with the band, and he finds success with it, as it tops the US and Australian albums charts upon its debut. It sells 252,000 copies in its opening week in the US, and it makes him the first male frontman from a previous band to top the chart with their debut album since the chart's inception in 1955. It held on to the 4th best-selling album of the week in its second week as well.
- Mudvayne releases their third studio album, Lost and Found. It debuts at number 2 on the Billboard 200 chart, a career high for the band. Upon release, the albums lead sing, "Happy?", peaks at 89 on the all-format Hot 100 song, their only song to ever crossover to the chart.
- Garbage - releases their fourth studio album, Bleed Like Me. It debuts in the top 5 of 8 national albums charts, including the US Billboard 200, the band's only entry in its top 10.
- Bruce Springsteen - releases his thirteenth studio album, Devils & Dust. It debuts atop 12 national album charts, including the US Billboard 200.

=== May ===
- Nine Inch Nails releases their fourth studio album, With Teeth. The album is their first in almost 6 years, following frontman Trent Reznors efforts to get sober and go to rehab after almost overdosing in touring in support of their prior album, The Fragile (1999), and its lyrical content serves as an allegory about said efforts. The album debuts atop of the Billboard 200 chart, selling 272,000 units in it opening week. It is the band's second album to top the chart in row, following The Fragile prior.
- Fall Out Boy releases their second studio album, From Under the Cork Tree. It debuts at number 9 on the Billboard 200, selling 68,000 copies. The album goes on get a 2× platinum RIAA certification.
- Dave Matthews Band - releases their sixth studio album, Stand Up. It is their fourth studio album in a row to top the Billboard 200 albums chart, in a run that eventually includes seven albums in a row - Before These Crowded Streets (1998), Everyday (2001), Busted Stuff (2002), Stand Up (2005), Big Whiskey & the GrooGrux King (2009), Away from the World (2012), and Come Tomorrow.
- Weezer's fifth studio album, Make Believe, debuts directly below Dave Matthews Band's Stand Up at number 2 on the Billboard 200, selling selling 193,000 copies its first week.
- System of a Down releases their fourth studio album, Mezmerize. The album is considered by the band to be the first half of a double album, with the second half, Hypnotize, releasing six months later. Mezmerize tops over 10 national album charts, including the US, where it sold 453,000 copies in its opening week.
- Audioslave releases their second studio album Out of Exile. It tops the Billboard 200 chart, selling 263,000 copies in its opening week.
- Green Day's single "Holiday" peaks at number 19 on the Billboard Hot 100 chart.

=== June ===
- Coldplay releases their third studio album, X&Y. It reaches the number-one position on the charts of 32 countries, including the UK, where it had the third-highest sales week in history at the time, and the US, where it became Coldplay's first album to top the Billboard 200 chart). The album would go on to sell 8.3 million copies sold worldwide, making it best-selling album of 2005, and accumulated over 13 million units as of December 2012. Debut single "Speed of Sound also reached the top ten of the Hot 100 as well.
- The Foo Fighters release their fifth studio album, In Your Honor. It is a double album; half is hard rock, while the other half is acoustic rock. It tops 5 national album charts, and debuts at number 2 in the US and UK due to the release of Coldplay's X&Y album. It debuts with 310,500 copies in the United States and 159,179 in the UK - both the highest for the band to-date.
- System of a Down's single "B.Y.O.B" peaks at number 27 on the US Billboard Hot 100 chart, making it the band's highest charting appearance on the song, and their only top 40 song.

=== July ===
- Foo Fighters single - "Best of You" spend 4 consecutive weeks at the Mainstream rock chart, and later hits the top 20 of the Billboard all format Hot 100 chart.
- The All-American Rejects release their second studio album, Move Along. It debuted at No. 6 on the Billboard 200, selling 90,000 copies in its first week, and goes on to spend 84 weeks inside the top 100 of the chart. The album was later certified 3 times Platinum by the RIAA for the shipment of 3 million copies. "Dirty Little Secret" peaked at #9 on the Billboard Hot 100.

=== August ===
- Staind releases their fifth studio album, Chapter V. It tops the Billboard 200 albums charts, selling 185,000 copies in its opening week. While it is the band's third consecutive album to top the chart, first week sales are quite below the previous two albums Break the Cycle (760,000 copies) and 14 Shades of Grey (220,000 copies), and it would be their last to top the chart.
- 311 - releases their eighth studio album, Don't Tread on Me. It debuts at number 5 on the Billboard 200 chart, selling 91,000 copies in its opening week.
- Death Cab for Cutie releases their fifth studio album and major record label debut, Plans. It debuts at number four on the Billboard 200 chart, selling 90,000 copies in its opening week. The album would go on to spend 50 weeks on the chart in subsequent years.

=== September ===
- Panic! at the Disco releases their debut album, A Fever You Can't Sweat Out. While it debuts at a modest number 13 on the Billboard 200 albums chart, it goes on to receive a 4× platinum RIAA certification.
- Disturbed releases their third studio album, Ten Thousand Fists. It tops the Billboard 200 chart, selling 239,000 copies in its first week. It was the band's second of five consecutive albums top the chart.

=== October ===
- Green Day's single "Wake Me Up When September Ends" peaks at number 6 on the Billboard Hot 100 chart.

=== November ===
- System of a Down releases their fifth studio album, Hypnotize. The album is considered the second of a double album that started with the release of Mezmerize in May 2005. Like Mezmerize, Hypnotize tops the Billboard 200 chart in its first week, though it sells over 100,000 less copies than Mezmerize, at 320,000 copies sold. It's the band's third of three albums to top the chart, alongside Toxicity (2001), though despite the commercial success, is their last album to be released to date.
- Audioslave's single "Doesn't Remind Me" finds crossover success, peaking at 68 on the Billboard Hot 100 chart.
- Shinedown's single "Save Me" tops the Mainstream Rock chart, and stays there for 12 consecutive weeks. Its the band's first of 20 single to top the chart, more than any other band as of 2025.

=== December ===
- Korn releases their seventh studio album, See You on the Other Side. It debuts at number 3 on the Billboard 200 chart, selling 220,000 copies in its first week. In the same month, lead single "Twisted Transistor" peaks at number 64 on the Hot 100 singles chart, the second highest of the band's career to-date, below "Did My Time" (2003).

=== Year end ===
- Coldplay's X&Y album is best-selling album of 2005.

== Deaths ==
- Norberto "Pappo" Napolitano, 54, One of the most influential figures in Argentine music, he was a forerunner of Argentine rock and Argentine heavy metal.
- Karl Mueller, 41, founding bassist for the rock band Soul Asylum, dies of throat cancer.

== Band breakups ==
- Blink 182 takes an indefinite hiatus upon infighting between band members about the band and its future direction. Mark Hoppus and Travis Barker split off to start +44, while Tom Delonge splits off to start Angels and Airwaves.
