= La Vie Théodore =

Studio album by Alain Souchon
- Released: 2 September 2005
- Recorded: France, 2005
- Genre: Pop
- Length: 40:18
- Label: Virgin

Alain Souchon chronology
J'veux du live (2002)	La Vie Théodore (2005)	Écoutez d'où ma peine vient (2008)

Singles from C'est déjà ça
- 1. "Et si en plus y'a personne" Released: September 2005; 2. "La Vie Théodore" Released: March 2006

La Vie Théodore is a 2005 album recorded by French singer Alain Souchon. It was his eleventh studio album and was released on 2 September 2005. It achieved smash success in France where it remained for 66 weeks in the top 200, including two weeks at the top. It was also successful in Belgium (Wallonia) (#1) and hit a moderate success in Switzerland (#3). It provided two singles : "Et si en plus y'a personne" (#19 in France, #12 in Belgium) and "La Vie Théodore" (#68 in France). The album was almost entirely written by the singer himself, while the musics were composed by Laurent Voulzy and Souchon's son, Pierre Souchon, according to the songs. The album's name is a tribute to Théodore Monod.

== Track listing ==
Title	Length	Writer(s)	Compositor(s)
"Putain ça penche"	3:53	Alain Souchon	Laurent Voulzy
"J'aimais mieux quand c'était toi"	4:02	Alain Souchon	Alain Souchon
"Bonjour tristesse"	3:23	Alain Souchon	Alain Souchon
"La Vie Théodore"	3:54	Alain Souchon	Alain Souchon
"En collant l'oreille sur l'appareil"	4:20	Alain Souchon	Alain Souchon
"À cause d'elle"	3:44	Alain Souchon	Laurent Voulzy
"Et si en plus y'a personne"	4:09	Alain Souchon	Laurent Voulzy
"Le Mystère"	3:56	Alain Souchon	Alain Souchon
"Le Marin"	2:55	Alain Souchon	Pierre Souchon/Alain Souchon
"L'Île du dédain"	3:25	Alain Souchon	Pierre Souchon
"Lisa"	2:29	M. Davidovicci/P. Grillet	Pierre Souchon/J. Voulzy

Source : Allmusic.

== Releases ==
Date	Label	Country	Format	Catalog
2005	EMI Music	Belgium, France, Switzerland	CD	336968
2005	Virgin	Belgium, France, Switzerland	CD	3349452

== Certifications and sales ==
Country	Certification	Date	Sales certified	Physical sales
Belgium	Gold	January 14, 2006	25,000	
France	Platinum	October 20, 2005	300,000	462,100

== Charts ==
Chart (2005–2007)	Peak position
Belgian (Wallonia) Albums Chart	1
French Albums Chart	1
Swiss Albums Chart	3

End of year chart (2005)	Position
French Albums Chart	9
Belgian (Wallonia) Albums Chart	7
End of year chart (2006)	Position
French Albums Chart	92
