= Sinsemilia =

French reggae band

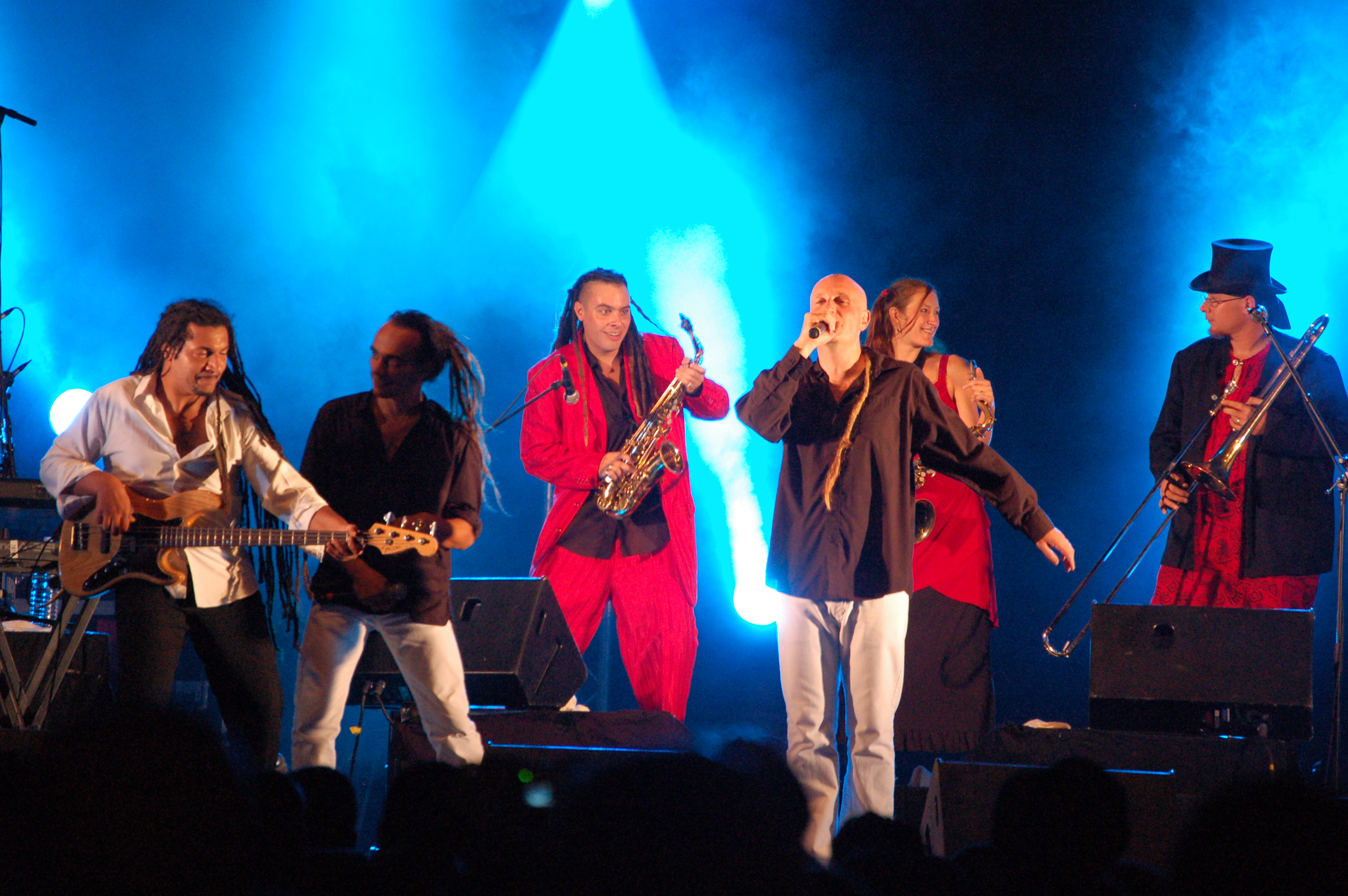

Sinsemilia (French pronunciation: [sinsemilja]), also known as Sinsé, is a French reggae band that was formed in Grenoble, Isère in 1990. The name of the group is very similar to sinsemilla, referring to cannabis which is unfertilised and hence seedless (literally "without seed" in Spanish). The band first used this name in concert at the Fête de la Musique in 1991, referring to the reggae album Sinsemilia by Black Uhuru. This was the first of more than a thousand concerts, and in the following fifteen years more than one million albums have been sold.

Since the success of their first album and their single "Tout le bonheur du monde", Sinsemilia has helped French reggae gain the attention of the media. In 2005, because of the success of "Tout le bonheur du monde", they were invited by the editors of France 2 to appear on the 1:00 pm news. They began their performance by singing "Tout le bonheur du monde" but quickly interrupted it to then sing their politically charged song "Bienvenue en Chiraquie", which provoked a small media scandal.

== Members ==
Current members

- Riké – lead vocals, guitar (1990–present)
- Mike – lead vocals, guitar (1990–present)
- Moussaya – guitar (1990–present)
- Natty – bass (1990–present)
- Zazz – keyboards (1990–present)
- Fabin – trumpet (1990–present)
- Carine – alto saxophone (1990–present)
- Ivan – percussion (1990–present)
- Roukin – percussion (1990–present)
- Chid – sound effects (1990–present)
- Olivah – trumpet (2003–present)
- Bozo – tenor saxophone (2005–present)
- Ali – keyboards (2008–present)
- Nordine – guitar (2008–present)

Former members

- Loucos – tenor saxophone (1990–2005)

== Discography ==
- 1996 Première Récolte
- 1998 Résistances
- 2000 Tout C'Qu'On A
- 2002 Sinsemilia Part en Live
- 2004 Debout, Les Yeux Ouverts
- 2009 En Quête De Sens
- 2015 Un Autre Monde Est Possible

== Band member activities outside of Sinsemilia ==
In June 2003, Riké released a solo album called Air frais ("Fresh Air"), with more traditional French music. The lyrics of this album were written by Mike, Riké's childhood friend. The lyrics are considered by many to be moving, and are less politically engaged than the group's albums. The song "Reveillez-Vous" features Tiken Jah Fakoly. Riké released a single after Air Frais with the song "Allez Savoir Pourquoi", which is of the "hardline" variety. His second album Vivons! was released on January 29, 2007.

Mike began his label ECHOPROD, and has signed artists such as Les Suprêmes Dindes, Pep's, Djemdi, Riké, and Junior Tshaka. The first release by his label was "Pas Vus à la Télé", a compilation of 70 French groups from all genres, with the hope of promoting artists who have never appeared on television.

Ivan works as a sound engineer for Wareika Hills, a reggae group from Grenoble. Fafa sings with Yoanna, a young Swiss singer who is accompanied by a group from Grenoble. Zazz is producing hip hop. Bozo is present in some parts of Root'Secours' latest album, Enfant Soldats. Olivah has worked exclusively with JFK, a reggae group from Grenoble. He has produced and arranged a CD of 7 songs called Politricks. Natty and the Special Hommage Band (made up of musicians from Grenoble and Zazz and Roukin) have given many Bob Marley tribute concerts.
