= Mon plus beau Noël =

Single by Johnny Hallyday

from the album Ma Vérité
- Language: French
- English title: My most beautiful Christmas
- B-side: "Je prendrai soin de vous"
- Released: December 2005
- Recorded: France, 2005
- Genre: Rock, christmas
- Length: 4:18
- Label: Mercury; Universal Music
- Songwriter(s): Fred Blondin

Johnny Hallyday singles chronology
"Ma religion dans son regard" (2005)	"Mon plus beau Noël" (2005)	"Le temps passe" (2006)

Music video
- "Mon plus beau Noël" on YouTube

"Mon plus beau Noël" ("My most beautiful Christmas") is a 2005 song recorded by French singer Johnny Hallyday. It was the second single on his album Ma Vérité on which it features as eighth track, and was released in December 2005 as a Christmas song. It was successful in Belgium (Wallonia), and particularly in France where it was Hallyday's third number-one single.

== Song information ==
The B-side, "Je prendrai soin de vous", was at the time a new song never published. "Mon plus beau Noël" was performed in 2006 at the Palais des Sports of Paris and was also included in a live version on the album Flashback Tour – Palais des Sports 2006, as fifth track of the second CD. The song is also available as B-side on the singer's 2006 single "La Quête" and on his compilation Triple Best Of, released in 2008.

"Mon plus beau Noël" is a tribute to Hallyday's daughter named Jade whom he just adopted and who features on the single cover. A choir of children can be heard in the second refrain, as well as Jade who babbles during the last seconds of the song.

In France, the single debuted at No. 6 on 10 December 2005, then climbed to No. 2, then topped the chart for one week. It kept on dropping the weeks after and totaled seven weeks in the top ten, 11 weeks in the top 50 and 16 weeks on the chart (top 100).

== Track listings ==
CD single

1. "Mon plus beau Noël" – 4:18
2. "Je prendrai soin de vous" – 4:59

Digital download

1. "Mon plus beau Noël" – 4:18
2. "Mon plus beau Noël" (live) – 4:30

CD single – Promo

1. "Mon plus beau Noël" – 4:18

== Credits ==
- Made in the European Union

"Mon plus beau Noël"

- Written by Fred Blondin
- Editions : Pimento Music / Zoé Production

"Je prendrai soin de vous"

- Written by Pierre Jaconelli
- Editions : WCMF / Daime Editions / Pimento Music

== Charts and sales ==
=== Peak positions ===
Chart (2005/06)	Peak position
Belgian (Wallonia) Singles Chart	2
Eurochart Hot 100 Singles	3
French SNEP Singles Chart	1
Swiss Singles Chart	14

=== Year-end charts ===
Chart (2005)	Position
Belgian (Wallonia) Singles Chart	84
French Singles Chart	26
Chart (2006)	Position
French Singles Chart	81

=== Certifications ===
Country	Certification	Date	Sales certified	Physical sales
France	Should be Gold	—	—	227,632 (165,353 in 2005 + 62,279 in 2006)
