= Scorpio Music =

French record label

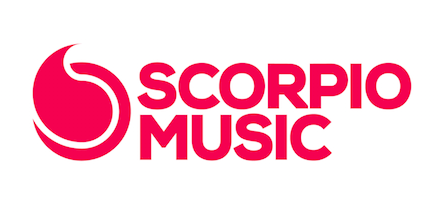
- Industry: Music, entertainment
- Founded: 1976
- Headquarters: Paris, France
- Key people: Henri Belolo (founder) Anthony Belolo (president)
- Divisions: Big Mix, Black Scorpio, In the Mix, Mascotte Music, Touch of Gold, Scorpio Beats
- Website: scorpiomusic.fr youtube.com/scorpiodigital

Scorpio Music is a French music label headquartered in Paris. The company was founded by Henri Belolo in 1976, best known as the original creator of The Ritchie Family and the disco group Village People with Jacques Morali.

Since 2011, the label has garnered a roster of artists including J Balvin, Martin Garrix, Showtek, Armin van Buuren, Deorro and Hardwell, Willy William.

== Labels ==
- Big Mix
- Black Scorpio
- In the Mix
- Mascotte Music
- Touch of Gold
- Scorpio Beats

== Artists ==
- Village People
- 2 Unlimited
- Haddaway
- Gala
- 20 Fingers
- Blue
- Lorna
- DHT
- Sharam
- Enur and Natasja Saad
- Michael Mind Project
- Greg Parys
- Alex Gaudino
- Benoit
- DJ Assad
- Katerine Avgoustakis
- Greg Parys
- Tristan Garner
- Ilona Mitrecey
- Antoine Debarge
- Najoua Belyzel
- Eleze
- Paris Avenue
- Kyle Evans
- Mr. Vegas
- Steve Aoki
- Deorro
- Dillon Francis
- Firebeatz
- 4TOLD
- Willy William
- Yoti die Griekse Boertjie
