= San ou (La Rivière) =

"San ou (La rivière)"

Single by Dezil'

from the album Welcome to the Paradise
- B-side: "Kreol version"
- Released: 2005
- Recorded: 2004
- Genre: Zouk; ragga
- Length: 3:22
- Label: SME; Vogue
- Songwriters: Eddie Thelemaque; Martin Lebon; Juan Romain

Dezil' singles chronology
"San ou (La rivière)" (2005)	"Laisse tomber les filles (Qui se maquillent)" (2005)

"San ou (La Rivière)" is a song recorded and produced by ragga band Dezil', written by Eddie Thelemaque, Martin Lebon and Juan Romain. It is the band's debut single from his album Welcome to the Paradise and was released on 27 June 2005. It enjoyed a commercial success in France where it became the fifth best-selling single of 2005.

== Background and release ==
The song was recorded in Mahé and the music video was shot in Praslin, Seychelles. According to the band's member Sandra Esparon, the song was released in Europe because it was already a hit in the Seychelles, and the recording company believed the song would have the potential to duplicate its success outside its home-country.

== Chart performances ==
In France, "San ou (La Rivière) reached number two for five non consecutive weeks, being unable to dislodge the Crazy Frog's "Axel F" which topped the chart then. After a debut at number six on 2 July 2005, "San ou (La Rivière)" spent 15 weeks in the top ten, 21 weeks in the top 50, and earned a diamond disc awarded by the SNEP on 12 October 2005. As of August 2014, it is the 37th best-selling single of the 21st century in France, with 463,000 units sold. It was a less massive hit in Belgium (Wallonia), where it peaked at number 11 and remained in the top 40 for eight weeks, and in Switzerland, where it was a top 20 hit.

== Track listings ==
CD single

1. "San ou (La Rivière)" – 3:22
2. "San ou (La Rivière)" (kreol) – 3:38
3. "San ou (La Rivière)" (karaoké) – 3:38

== Charts ==
=== Weekly charts ===
Chart (2005)	Peak position
Belgium (Ultratop 50 Wallonia)	11
France (SNEP)	2
Switzerland (Schweizer Hitparade)	19

=== Year-end charts ===
Chart (2005)	Position
Belgium (Wallonia)	100
Europe (Eurochart Hot 100)	39
France (SNEP)	5

=== Certifications ===
Country	Certification	Certified sales
France	Diamond	750,000
