= C'est les vacances =

Single by Ilona

from the album Un monde parfait
- Released: July 2005
- Recorded: France, Italy
- Genre: Children's music, Eurodance
- Length: 3:46
- Label: Universal
- Songwriters: Rosario Castagnola, Mixivan, Laurent Jeanne
- Producers: Ivan Russo, Rosario Castagnola

Ilona singles chronology
"Un monde parfait" (2005)	"C'est les vacances" (2005)	"Dans ma fusée" (2005)

"C'est les vacances" ("It's the Holidays/Vacations") is a 2005 song recorded by the French singer Ilona Mitrecey. It was released as second single from her debut album, Un monde parfait, on 19 July 2005. It enjoyed a great success in France, Belgium (Wallonia) and Switzerland, although it did not reach number-one like the previous single.

== Lyrics and music ==
Produced by Ivan Russo and Rosario Castagnola, the song was composed by the latter, Mixivan and Laurent Jeanne, who also performed the background vocals. The song was recorded in France and in Italy.

In this song, Ilona explains her holidays in Italy, with her friends.

== Chart performance ==
"C'est les vacances" enjoyed some success in France, but not as much as Ilona's previous single, "Un monde parfait". The single entered the SNEP chart at number three on 25 July 2005, where it stayed for two weeks, then peaked at number two, thus surpassing "Un monde parfait". Howerver, her first single managed to reach number two again, and "C'est les vacances" dropped to number three where it remained for three consecutive weeks, then was number four for four weeks. It spent twelve weeks in the top ten, 21 weeks in the top 50 and 29 weeks in the top 100. The Syndicat National de l'Édition Phonographique revealed the song was the fourth best-selling single during the first nine months of 2005, and the seventh one of the year. As of August 2014, it is the 41st best-selling single of the 21st century in France, with 451,000 units sold.

In Belgium (Wallonia), "C'est les vacances" debuted at number 27 on 16 July on the Ultratop 40 Singles Chart, then jumped to number six. Two weeks later, the song reached a peak at number three where it stayed for four non-consecutive weeks. It totaled twelve weeks in the top ten and 17 weeks in the top 40. In Switzerland, the single was listed for 27 weeks, from 31 July 2005 to 8 January 2006. It started at number nine and reached a peak at number six for two non-consecutive weeks. "C'est les vacances" had moderate success in Germany, where it peaked at number 61.

== Track listings ==
CD single - France

No.	Title	Length
1.	"C'est les vacances" (original version)	3:47
2.	"C'est les vacances" (fast & furious radio edit)	3:47

CD maxi (Atello)

No.	Title	Length
1.	"C'est les vacances" (original version)	3:47
2.	"C'est les vacances" (fast & furious radio edit)	3:47
3.	"C'est les vacances" (spaghetti version)	3:43
4.	"C'est les vacances" (karaoke version)	3:47
5.	"Un monde parfait" (Gabriel Ponte remix)	6:06

CD maxi (Universal)

No.	Title	Length
1.	"C'est les vacances" (original version)	3:46
2.	"C'est les vacances" (fast & furious radio edit)	3:46
3.	"C'est les vacances" (spaghetti version)	3:43
4.	"C'est les vacances" (karaoke version)	3:48

Digital download

No.	Title	Length
1.	"C'est les vacances" (original version)	3:45
2.	"C'est les vacances" (fast & furious radio edit)	3:50

== Credits and personnel ==
- Vocal : Ilona
- Music / Text : Laurent Jeanne, Mixivan, Rosario Castagnola
- Artistic producers : Ivan Russo, Rosario Castagnola
- Executive producer : Ivan Russo
- Guitar, bass and whistle : Rosario Castagnola
- Add vocal : Laurent Jeanne
- Mixed by : Ivan Russo
- Design and graphic : Stéphane Mit for Costume3pièces.
- Recording at Moneypenny Studio, Paris, France, Atollo Recording Studio, Naples, Italy, and at Studio Eclisse, Milan, Italy

== Charts ==
=== Weekly charts ===
Weekly charts for "C'est les vacances"
Chart (2005)	Peak position
Belgium (Ultratop 50 Wallonia)	3
Europe (Eurochart Hot 100 Singles)	8
France (SNEP)	2
France (Digital Chart)	6
Germany (Singles Chart)	61
Switzerland (Schweizer Hitparade)	6

=== Year-end charts ===
Year-end charts for "C'est les vacances"
Chart (2005)	Position
Belgian (Wallonia) Singles Chart	12
Europe (Eurochart Hot 100)	48
France (SNEP)	7
Swiss Singles Chart	60

== Sales ==
Sales for "C'est les vacances"
Country	Certification	Date	Sales certified	Physical sales
France	Should be Platinum	—	—	448,855+
