= Entre nous (Chimène Badi song) =

"Entre Nous"

Single by Chimène Badi

from the album Entre Nous
- B-side: "Instrumental"
- Released: January 2003
- Recorded: France
- Genre: Pop
- Length: 3:22
- Label: Universal Music
- Songwriter: Rick Allison
- Producer: Rick Allison

Chimène Badi singles chronology
"Entre Nous" (2003)	"Je vais te chercher" (2003)

"Entre Nous" is the name of a 2003 song recorded by the French-born singer Chimène Badi. Released as her debut single in January 2003 from the album of the same name on which it features as the first track, it allowed Badi to achieve success in France where it topped the chart, and was a top five hit in Belgium (Wallonia) and Switzerland. To date, it is her most successful single. As of August 2014, the song was the 15th best-selling single of the 21st century in France, with 584,000 units sold.

The song was also performed on Badi's 2005 concert at the Olympia, Paris, and was also included on her live album Live à l'Olympia, as sixth track on the second CD.

The song was covered by Marc Lavoine and Jean-Baptiste Maunier for Les Enfoirés' 2006 album Le Village des Enfoirés and included in a medley named "Medley Adultes en enfants". It was then covered again in 2012, this time sung by Amel Bent, Garou, Renan Luce and Hélène Segara

== Track listing ==
CD single

1. "Entre Nous" — 3:22
2. "Entre Nous" (instrumental version) — 3:03

Digital download

1. "Entre Nous" — 3:22
2. "Entre Nous" (live) — 4:34

== Certifications and sales ==
Country	Certification	Date	Sales certified
Belgium	Gold	10 May 2003	25,000
France	Platinum	4 December 2003	500,000

== Charts ==
Chart (2003)	Peak position
Belgian (Wallonia) Singles Chart	4
French SNEP Singles Chart	1
Swiss Singles Chart	5

Year-end chart (2003)	Position
Belgian (Wallonia) Singles Chart	15
French Airplay Chart	59
French TV Music Videos Chart	56
French Singles Chart	4
Swiss Singles Chart	37
