= Chimène Badi =

French singer

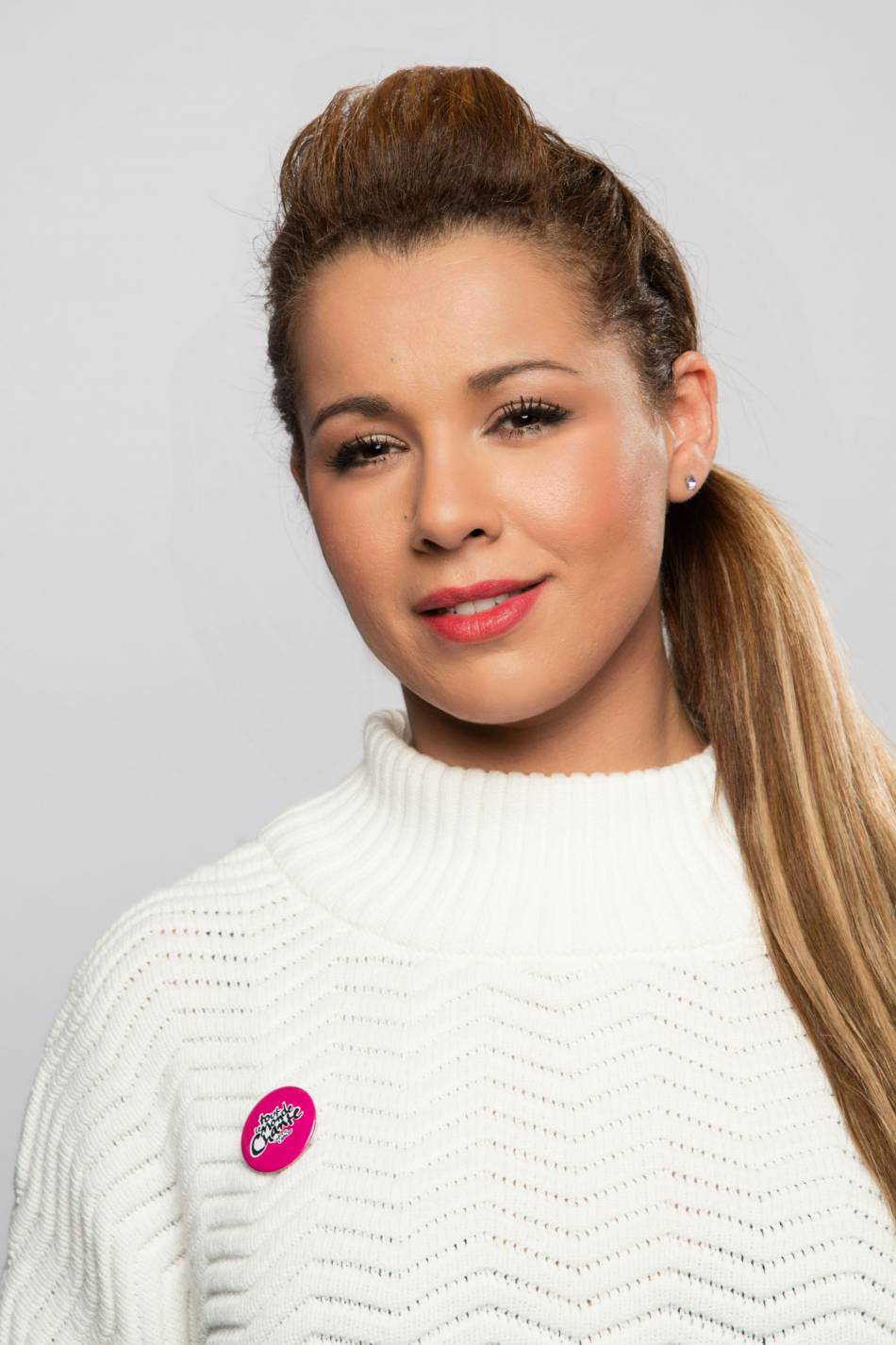
- Badi in 2022

Background information
- Born: 30 October 1982 (age 43); Melun, France
- Origin: Melun, Paris Region, France
- Genre: Soul
- Occupation: Singer
- Years active: 2003–present
- Label: Universal Music/AZ

Chimène Badi (French pronunciation: [ʃimɛn badi]; born 30 October 1982), also known by her mononym Chimène, is a French singer of Algerian descent.

== Early life ==
Badi was born in Melun in the Paris suburbs to a family of Algerian origin. She spent her entire childhood in the south-west of France. She grew up in Villeneuve-sur-Lot with her parents, Chérifa and Mohammed, her sister, Déborah, and her brother, Karim. Her sister Déborah encouraged her to persevere with her singing and Chimène went on to hone her vocal style still further, performing at family parties and regional song contests from the age of six.

Badi also made her mark at her school's end-of-year shows, wowing the audience with her confident vocal performance. Teachers barely recognised her since, when she was off stage, Badi was a notoriously shy pupil, given to daydreaming and complexes about her appearance. Meanwhile, she plugged away at her studies, going on to obtain a "BEP" in agribusiness.

== Career ==
Badi did not win the French reality TV show, Popstars, but she released her first single "Entre Nous" in 2003, which reached number 1 in the French charts. An album of the same name reached number 4 in domestic charts, and became the fifth best selling French album of 2003.

Badi's follow-up albums and singles enjoyed moderate success in Francophone Europe, including Wallonia and Switzerland. She also provided the French language theme song to the film The Day After Tomorrow – "Le Jour d'après" (The Day After). She worked with producer Guy Roche (Tout Contre Toi) and songwriter Diane Warren (Tellement Beau).

In 2011, Badi covered the soul classic "Ain't No Mountain High Enough" with American singer Billy Paul. She participated in the 2019 edition of Destination Eurovision to attempt to represent France at the Eurovision Song Contest 2019 in Tel Aviv, Israel, with the song "Là-haut". She placed third overall in the final.

== Discography ==
=== Albums ===
Year	Album	Peak position				French sales
Year	Album	FR	FR DL^{1}	BEL (Wa)	SWI	French sales
2003	Entre nous	4	—	35	10	625,000
2004	Dis-moi que tu m'aimes	1	—	2	35	1,200,000
2006	Live à l'Olympia	2	—	3	30	180,000
2006	Le Miroir	3	1	8	34	330,000
2010	Laisse-les dire	4	2	3	34	110,000
2011	Gospel & Soul	7	7	4	42	250,000
2015	Au-delà des maux	6		10	61	
2019	Chimène	25		14	50	
2023	Chimène chante Piaf	4		5	64	France: Gold

^{1} French Digital Charts

=== Singles ===
Year	Single	Peak Position				Album
Year	Single	FR	FR (DL)^{1}	BEL (Wa)	CH	Album
2003	"Entre nous"	1	—	4	5	Entre nous
2003	"Je vais te chercher"	16	—	36	43	Entre nous
2003	"Si j'avais su t'aimer"	21	—	—	69	Entre nous
2004	"Le jour d'après"	7	—	6	24	Dis-moi que tu m'aimes
2004	"Je ne sais pas son nom"	12	—	13	—	Dis-moi que tu m'aimes
2005	"Je viens du sud"	2	—	2	27	Dis-moi que tu m'aimes
2005	"Retomber amoureux"	11	—	8	38	Dis-moi que tu m'aimes
2005	"Dis-moi que tu m'aimes"	23	—	30	50	Dis-moi que tu m'aimes
2006	"Tellement Beau"	15	33	15	—	Le Miroir
2010	"Laisse-les dire"	—	—	—	—	Laisse-les dire
2010	"En équilibre"	—	—	—	—	Laisse-les dire
2010	"Plus de devoirs que de droits"	—	—	—	—	Laisse-les dire
2010	"D'une fille à sa mère"	—	—	—	—	Laisse-les dire
2011	"Ma liberté"	168	—	—	—	Gospel & Soul
2011	"Parlez-moi de lui"	85	—	42	—	Gospel & Soul
2011	"Ain't No Mountain High Enough" (with Billy Paul)	—	—	—	—	Gospel & Soul
2012	"Ma liberté"	168	—	—	—	Gospel & Soul
2014	"Mes silences"	139	—	—	—	
2018	"Là-haut"	—	—	—	—	
"—" denotes releases that did not chart or were not released in that country.

^{1} French Digital Charts

== Musical ==
Year	Title	Director	Notes
2016	Cats	Trevor Nunn	Théâtre Mogador
