= Un Monde parfait =

2005 single by Ilona

"Un monde parfait"

Single by Ilona

from the album Un monde parfait
- Released: 24 February 2005
- Recorded: Paris, France; Naples, Italy
- Length: 3:43
- Label: Sony BMG Music
- Songwriters: Laurent Jeanne; M. Pirolla; Domydee; R. Castagnola
- Producers: Ivan Russo; Rosario Castagnola

Ilona singles chronology
| "Un monde parfait" (2005) | "C'est les vacances" (2005) |

"Un monde parfait" (English: "A Perfect World") is a song by French child singer Ilona Mitrecey. Based on a traditional Neapolitan song, it was released as the first single from her debut album, Un monde parfait, on 24 February 2005. In France, it was the most successful single of 2005, peaking atop the French Singles Chart for 15 consecutive weeks and receiving a diamond sales certification. It was also released in many other European countries and achieved success, reaching number one in Wallonia and entering the top three in Austria, Germany and Switzerland. It was the best-selling single of the 21st century in France, with 1.5 million copies sold. Ilona was only 10 years old when she sang the song.

== Background and writing ==
In 2004, one year after its recording in France, the single had already been released in Italy, under the name 'Très Bien featuring Ilona'. Originally, it was intended for the Italian dancefloors.

During an interview, Ilona explained that before "Un monde parfait", she sang just for fun with her friends. She confided that she recorded "Un monde parfait" completely by chance and she did that only for play. Her father's society had asked whether she could sing this song from Italy. As she had already sung for some advertisements, she accepted, saying to herself that it could be funny to try.

== Music and video ==
The little girl representing Ilona and the other characters, in the multicoloured music video for "Un Monde parfait".

The French charts specialist Elia Habib explains that this song "mixes an involving sonority resembling Daddy DJ with a text in the spirit of a nursery rhyme". It created "the major surprise of the beginning of spring 2005".

The music video is computer-animated and shows a little girl who will feature in all the other videoclips of the singles from the album Un monde parfait. Ilona features only in the first seconds. She explained that the producers had decided to make most of the video a cartoon because it tallied well with the lyrics and that would preserve her anonymity.

Ilona says in this song that when she starts to draw, she imagines a perfect world populated of technicolor flowers and animals. Six of these animals also appear in Ilona's all other music videos and on every cover of the singles from Un monde parfait.

== Chart performance ==
In France, "Un monde parfait" entered the chart to number two on 27 February 2005 and climbed to number one the following week, a position it hold for 15 weeks. It remained on the top ten for 28 weeks and on the top 100 for 41 weeks, becoming the single's longest chart run in France in 2005. It was the best selling single that year and was certified Diamond disc by Syndicat National de l'Édition Phonographique, and eventually became the best best-selling single of the 21st century in France, with 1,500,000 units sold. According to author and expert of French charts Elia Habib, Ilona, who was 11 years old in 2005, remains "the first native of the Nineties to reach number one of the [French Singles Chart]. Through her age, she now appears in Record books, [because she is] the second youngest artist to peak at the top position, behind Jordy (four years old)". "Un monde parfait" was also cited as the most lucrative song of 2006 at the time of a conference given by the SACEM.

In Belgium (Wallonia), the single remained on the Ultratop 40 Singles Chart for 32 weeks and topped the chart for 12 weeks. It was certified Silver disc and ranked second on the 2005 year-end chart, behind Crazy Frog's "Axel F". On the Swiss Singles Chart, the single went to number 16 on 3 April 2005, reached a peak of number three on 1 May and fell off the chart after 34 weeks. It appeared on the Austrian Top 75 Singles Chart for 22 weeks and reached number three twice. One year later, in July 2006, the single made a short appearance of two weeks on the Dutch Mega Top 100, peaking at number 92.

== TV performances and cover versions ==
Le 6/9, a French team, recorded a parody of this song, under the title "Un casting parfait". This version peaked at number six on the French SNEP Singles Chart and at number 78 in Switzerland.

The song was covered by Les Enfoirés on their album 2011: Dans l'œil des Enfoirés, and included in the medley "Un monde parfait". The song was performed by Alizée & Claire Keim, with additional vocals from Grégoire, Christophe Maé & Pascal Obispo.

== Track listings ==
CD single – France

| No. | Title | Length |
|---|---|---|
| 1. | "Un monde parfait" (original version) | 3:05 |
| 2. | "Un monde parfait" (72 remix radio edit) | 3:41 |

CD maxi Universal

| No. | Title | Length |
|---|---|---|
| 1. | "Un monde parfait" (original version) | 3:05 |
| 2. | "Un monde parfait" (72 fast & furious radio edit) | 3:44 |
| 3. | "Un monde parfait" (whistler remix) | 3:17 |
| 4. | "Un monde parfait" (extended mix) | 5:08 |
| 5. | "Un monde parfait" (Blade remix) | 4:21 |
| 6. | "Un monde parfait" (karaoke version) | 3:44 |

CD maxi 1 Atollo / Universal

| No. | Title | Length |
|---|---|---|
| 1. | "Un monde parfait" (original version) | 3:47 |
| 2. | "Un monde parfait" (72 fast & furious radio edit) | 3:44 |
| 3. | "Un monde parfait" (whistler remix) | 3:17 |
| 4. | "Un monde parfait" (party mix) | 3:31 |
| 5. | "Un monde parfait" (extended mix) | 5:08 |
| 6. | "Un monde parfait" (Blade remix) | 4:21 |
| 7. | "Un monde parfait" (videoclip) |

CD maxi 2 Atollo / Universal

| No. | Title | Length |
|---|---|---|
| 1. | "Un monde parfait" (original version) | 3:47 |
| 2. | "A Perfect World" (original English version) | 3:08 |
| 3. | "Un monde parfait" (72 fast & furious remix radio edit) | 3:43 |
| 4. | "Un monde parfait" (Gabriel Ponte remix) | 6:06 |

12-inch maxi

| No. | Title | Length |
|---|---|---|
| 1. | "Un monde parfait" (extended mix) |
| 2. | "Un monde parfait" (Blade remix) |
| 3. | "Un monde parfait" (Glasperlen remix) |
| 4. | "Un monde parfait" (Gabriel Ponte remix) |
| 5. | "Un monde parfait" (72 fast & furious remix) |
| 6. | "Un monde parfait" (electro dub) |

Digital download

| No. | Title | Length |
|---|---|---|
| 1. | "Un monde parfait" (original version) | 3:07 |
| 2. | "Un monde parfait" (remix radio edit) | 3:42 |
| 3. | "Un monde parfait" (72 fast & furious remix radio edit) | 3:41 |
| 4. | "Un monde parfait" (acoustic remix) | 3:16 |
| 5. | "Un monde parfait" (karaoke version) | 3:44 |

== Credits and personnel ==
Original version

- Written by Laurent Jeanne, M. Pirolla, Domydee, R. Castagnola
- Executive producer : Ivan Russo
- Assistant producer : Ivan Russo and Rosario Castagnola
- Produced at Studio Moneypenny (Paris)
- Vocal : Ilona
- Choir : Laurent Jeanne
- Guitars and bass : Rosario Castagnola
- Fisa : Antonio Russo
- Arrangements : Ivan Russo, Domydee and Rosario Castagnola, at Studio Atollo Recordes
- Mixed by Ivan Russo at Studio Atollo Recording (Neaple)

Whistler remix / Party remix / Extended mix / Blade remix

- Remix and additional production by Glasperlen-spierlern (Robert Wässer, Daniel Scholz and Kay Wittgenstein

72 fest & forios radio edit

- Remix and additional production by P. Aliberti, Cipro and C. Piccinelli for 72trax Productions
- Original editors : Universal Music Italia Srl / Atollo / Moneypenny

Cover and design

- Photo : Stéphane Gizard
- Artwork : Objectif Lune
- Design elements and graphique : Studio Nestor for Costume3pièces, Courtesy for Scorpio Music

Videoclip

- Produced by Stéphane Mit

== Charts ==
=== Weekly charts ===
Weekly chart performance for "Un monde parfait"
| Chart (2005–2006) | Peak position |
|---|---|
| Austria (Ö3 Austria Top 40) | 3 |
| Belgium (Ultratip Bubbling Under Flanders) | 17 |
| Belgium (Ultratop 50 Wallonia) | 1 |
| Europe (Eurochart Hot 100) | 2 |
| France (SNEP) | 1 |
| France Digital (SNEP) | 5 |
| Germany (GfK) | 2 |
| Netherlands (Single Top 100) | 92 |
| Switzerland (Schweizer Hitparade) | 3 |

=== Year-end charts ===
Year-end chart performance for "Un monde parfait"
| Chart (2005) | Position |
|---|---|
| Austria (Ö3 Austria Top 40) | 37 |
| Belgium (Ultratop 50 Wallonia) | 2 |
| Europe (Eurochart Hot 100) | 3 |
| France (SNEP) | 1 |
| Germany (Media Control GfK) | 31 |
| Switzerland (Schweizer Hitparade) | 23 |

== Certifications and sales ==
Certifications for "Un monde parfait"
| Region | Certification | Certified units/sales |
|---|---|---|
| Belgium (BRMA) | Platinum | 50,000^{*} |
| France (SNEP) | Diamond | 1,494,129+ |
^{*} Sales figures based on certification alone.
