= Ilona Mitrecey =

- Born: 1 September 1993 (age 33); Fontenay-aux-Roses, France
- Occupation: Singer
- Years active: 2004–2007; 2021-present
- Musical career
- Genre: Techno-pop
- Instrument: Vocals
- Label: Scorpio

Ilona Mitrecey, more commonly known as Ilona, is a French singer.

== Early life and education ==
Ilona Mitrecey was born in Fontenay-aux-Roses, France. She finished high school at Lycée Pasteur in Neuilly-sur-Seine in Hauts-de-Seine.

She has sung in many advertisements. Her father, Daniel, was the singer in the band playing in some shows of Canal Plus and he composed the music of some films of Max Pécas, and her mother, Sylvie, works at the Michel Lafon publishing house. Her mother is now in a relationship with Rachid Arhab, a famous French journalist.

== Career ==
Ilona became famous in France after the release of her hit single, "Un Monde parfait" ("A Perfect World"), a high-energy Eurodance song which had already been released in Italy in March 2004 under the name 'Très Bien featuring Ilona', on 28 February 2005. The song reached #1 on France's SNEP charts on 6 March 2005, and stayed on top of the charts for 15 weeks. Her second single, "C'est les vacances", was released on 20 June 2005.

She has sung in many advertisements. Her debut album, Un Monde Parfait was released on 10 October 2005. It won an EBBA Award.

In 2007, she decided to stop her singing career to focus on her studies and enrolled in cinema studies between France and New York City, where she lived for a year.

In 2021, she returned to her singing career with her new single Magical World (Ilona Mitrecey song).

== Discography ==
=== Albums ===
List of albums, with selected chart positions and certifications
Title	Album details	Peak chart positions (Note: Un monde parfait was released as Ilona in Germany and Switzerland.)					Certifications
Title	Album details	FRA	BEL (Wa)	GER	POR	SWI	Certifications
Un monde parfait	Released: 2005; Label: Scorpio, Sony; Formats: CD, digital download, streaming	2	9	14	2	31	SNEP: 2× Gold
Laissez-nous respirer	Released: 2006; Label: Sony; Formats: CD, digital download, streaming	70	—	—	—	—	
"—" denotes an item that did not chart or was not released in that territory.

=== Singles ===
List of singles, with selected chart positions, sales figures, and certifications
Title	Year	Peak chart positions								Sales	Certifications	Album
Title	Year	FRA	AUT	BEL (Fl)	BEL (Wa)	EUR	GER	NLD	SWI	Sales	Certifications	Album
"Un monde parfait"	2005	1	3	— (Note: "Un monde parfait" did not enter the Ultratop 50 Singles chart, but peaked at number seventeen on the Ultratip chart.)	1	2	2	92	3	FRA: 1,600,000 (Note: Sales of "Un monde parfait" in France as of December 2005.)	SNEP: Diamond; BEA: Platinum	Un monde parfait
"C'est les vacances"	2005	2	—	—	3	8	61	—	6	FRA: 500,000 (Note: Sales of "C'est les vacances" in France as of December 2005.)		Un monde parfait
"Dans ma fusée"	2005	3	—	—	13	13	—	—	34		SNEP: Gold	Un monde parfait
"Noël, que du bonheur"	2005	5	—	—	10	—	—	—	—		SNEP: Gold	Un monde parfait
"Allô, allô"	2006	10	—	—	35	—	—	—	—			Un monde parfait
"Laissez-nous respirer"	2006	16	—	—	— (Note: "Laissez-nous respirer" did not enter the Ultratop 50 Singles chart, but peaked at number three on the Ultratip chart.)	—	—	—	—			Laissez-nous respirer
"Chiquitas"	2007	13	—	—	—	—	—	—	—			Laissez-nous respirer
"—" denotes an item that did not chart or was not released in that territory.
