= Dezil' =

Seychelles reggae band

- Origin: Seychelles
- Genres: Reggae; zouk
- Years active: 2003–present
- Labels: Sony; Dezil Music Production
- Members: Sandra; Juan; Martin; Michael
- Website: www.mydezilofficial.com

Dezil' is a music band from Seychelles.

The group was formed in 2005. They received a diamond disc award after their debut single "San ou (La Rivière)" reached second position on the French music chart.

== Discography ==
=== Albums ===
- Welcome to the Paradise (2006)
- To ou tar (2017)

=== Singles ===
- "San ou (La Rivière)" : #2 in France, 550,000 copies sold, #11 in Belgium (Wallonia), #19 in Switzerland
- "Laisse tomber les filles (qui se maquillent)" [cover version of a 1980s hit, "Pass the Dutchie" by Musical Youth, a group composed of teenagers] : #13 in France, #47 in Switzerland
- "Tu peux crier" : #17 in France
