= List of number-one hits of 2008 (Germany) =

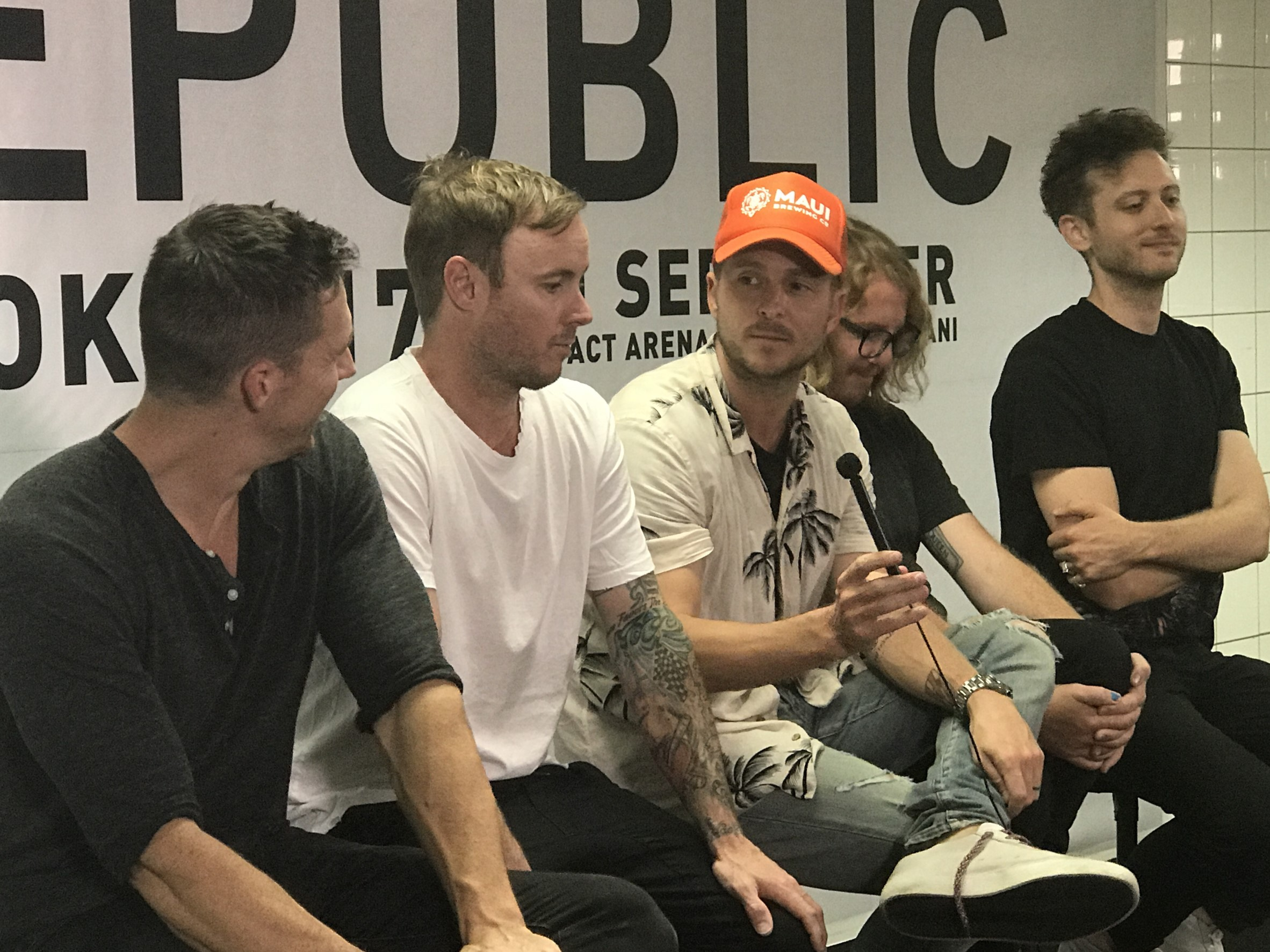
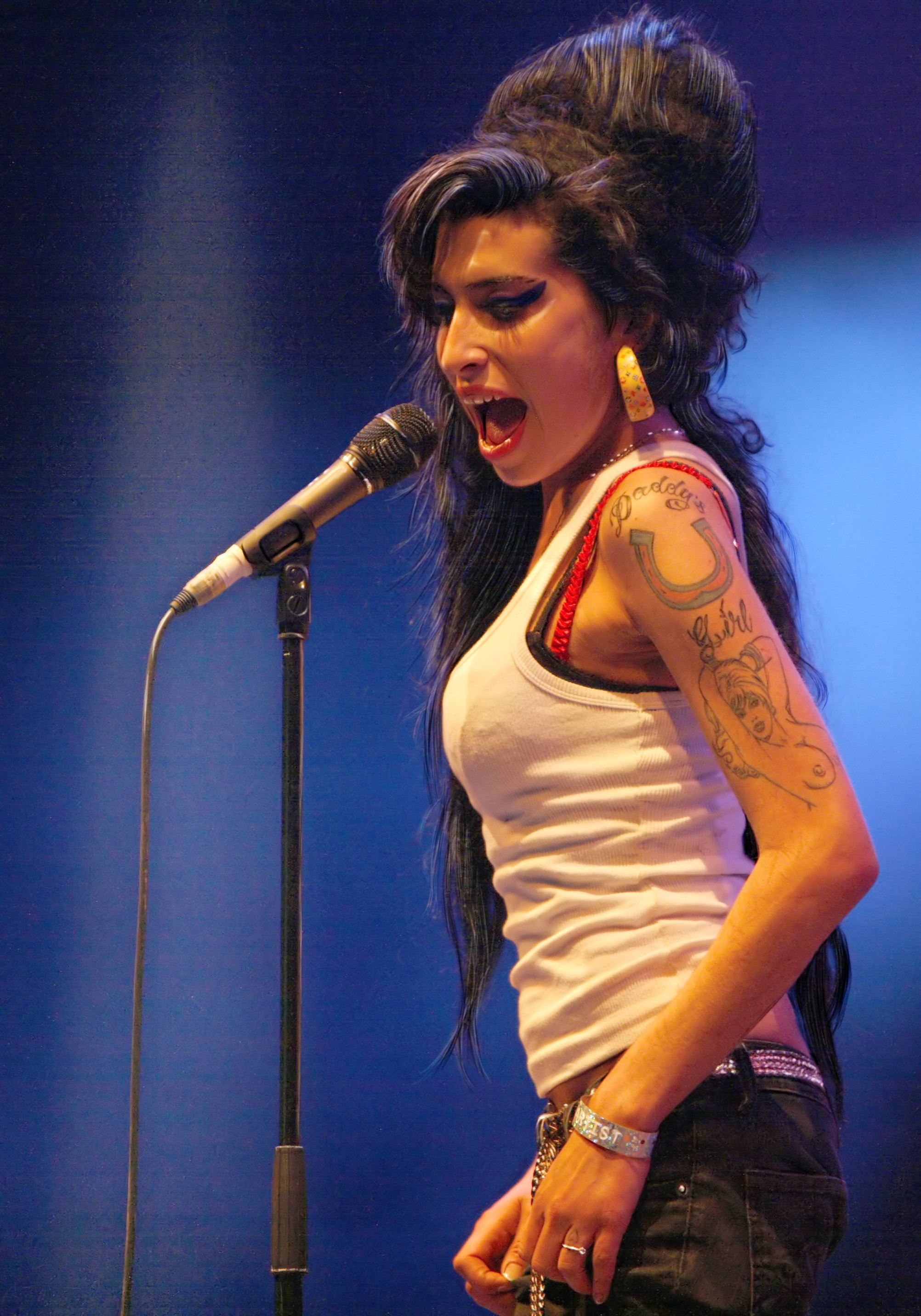
Timbaland and OneRepublic's (pictured) "Apologize" became the best-performing single of 2008, while Amy Winehouse's Back to Black became the best-performing album of the year.

This is a list of the German Media Control Top100 Singles & Top100 Albums Charts number-ones of 2008.

== Number-one hits by week ==
Key
†	Indicates best-performing single and album of 2008

Issue date	Single	Artist	Ref.	Album	Artist	Ref.
4 January	"Apologize" †	Timbaland featuring OneRepublic		Jazz ist anders	Die Ärzte	
11 January	"Apologize" †	Timbaland featuring OneRepublic		Back to Black †	Amy Winehouse	
18 January	"Apologize" †	Timbaland featuring OneRepublic		Back to Black †	Amy Winehouse	
25 January	"Bleeding Love"	Leona Lewis		Back to Black †	Amy Winehouse	
1 February	"Bleeding Love"	Leona Lewis		Back to Black †	Amy Winehouse	
8 February	"Bleeding Love"	Leona Lewis		Spirit	Leona Lewis	
15 February	"Bleeding Love"	Leona Lewis		Back to Black †	Amy Winehouse	
22 February	"Kuschel Song"	Schnuffel		Back to Black †	Amy Winehouse	
29 February	"Kuschel Song"	Schnuffel		Back to Black †	Amy Winehouse	
7 March	"Kuschel Song"	Schnuffel		Sehnsucht	Schiller	
14 March	"Kuschel Song"	Schnuffel		Back to Black †	Amy Winehouse	
21 March	"Kuschel Song"	Schnuffel		Back to Black †	Amy Winehouse	
28 March	"Kuschel Song"	Schnuffel		Back to Black †	Amy Winehouse	
4 April	"Kuschel Song"	Schnuffel		Back to Black †	Amy Winehouse	
11 April	"Kuschel Song"	Schnuffel		Stark wie zwei	Udo Lindenberg	
18 April	"Mercy"	Duffy		Stark wie zwei	Udo Lindenberg	
25 April	"4 Minutes"	Madonna featuring Justin Timberlake		Stark wie zwei	Udo Lindenberg	
2 May	"4 Minutes"	Madonna featuring Justin Timberlake		Stark wie zwei	Udo Lindenberg	
9 May	"4 Minutes"	Madonna featuring Justin Timberlake		Hard Candy	Madonna	
16 May	"Summer Love"	Mark Medlock		Hard Candy	Madonna	
23 May	"Summer Love"	Mark Medlock		Sængerkrieg	In Extremo	
30 May	"Summer Love"	Mark Medlock		Radio Pandora	BAP	
6 June	"Love Is You"	Thomas Godoj		Live over Europe 2007	Genesis	
13 June	"Love Is You"	Thomas Godoj		Ich und meine Maske	Sido	
20 June	"Feel The Rush"	Shaggy featuring Trix & Flix		Vom selben Stern	Ich + Ich	
27 June	"All Summer Long"	Kid Rock		Viva la Vida or Death and All His Friends	Coldplay	
4 July	"All Summer Long"	Kid Rock		Viva la Vida or Death and All His Friends	Coldplay	
11 July	"All Summer Long"	Kid Rock		Viva la Vida or Death and All His Friends	Coldplay	
18 July	"All Summer Long"	Kid Rock		Plan A!	Thomas Godoj	
25 July	"All Summer Long"	Kid Rock		Viva la Vida or Death and All His Friends	Coldplay	
1 August	"All Summer Long"	Kid Rock		One Chance	Paul Potts	
8 August	"All Summer Long"	Kid Rock		One Chance	Paul Potts	
15 August	"All Summer Long"	Kid Rock		One Chance	Paul Potts	
22 August	"Das hat die Welt noch nicht gesehen"	Söhne Mannheims		One Chance	Paul Potts	
29 August	"I Kissed a Girl"	Katy Perry		One Chance	Paul Potts	
5 September	"I Kissed a Girl"	Katy Perry		One Chance	Paul Potts	
12 September	"Gib mir Sonne"	Rosenstolz		Ewig	Peter Maffay	
19 September	"I Kissed a Girl"	Katy Perry		One Chance	Paul Potts	
26 September	"I Kissed a Girl"	Katy Perry		Death Magnetic	Metallica	
3 October	"I Kissed a Girl"	Katy Perry		Wettsingen in Schwetzingen - MTV Unplugged	Söhne Mannheims vs. Xavier Naidoo	
10 October	"So What"	Pink		Die Suche geht weiter	Rosenstolz	
17 October	"So What"	Pink		Die Suche geht weiter	Rosenstolz	
24 October	"So What"	Pink		Heavy Metal Payback	Bushido	
31 October	"Allein Allein"	Polarkreis 18		Black Ice	AC/DC	
7 November	"Allein Allein"	Polarkreis 18		Black Ice	AC/DC	
14 November	"Allein Allein"	Polarkreis 18		Black Ice	AC/DC	
21 November	"Allein Allein"	Polarkreis 18		Black Ice	AC/DC	
28 November	"Allein Allein"	Polarkreis 18		In aller Stille	Die Toten Hosen	
5 December	"Hot n Cold"	Katy Perry		Was muss muss (Best of)	Herbert Grönemeyer	
12 December	"Hot n Cold"	Katy Perry		Was muss muss (Best of)	Herbert Grönemeyer	
19 December	"Hot n Cold"	Katy Perry		Der Mann mit der Mundharmonika	Michael Hirte	
26 December	"Hot n Cold"	Katy Perry		Was muss muss (Best of)	Herbert Grönemeyer	

== See also ==
- List of number-one hits (Germany)
- List of German airplay number-one songs
