= List of number-one hits of 2008 (Austria) =

This is a list of the Austrian number-one singles of 2008.

Issue date	Song	Artist	Album	Artist
4 January	"Apologize"	Timbaland presents OneRepublic	"Vol. 13"	Kiddy Contest
11 January	"Apologize"	Timbaland presents OneRepublic	"Timbaland Presents Shock Value"	Timbaland
18 January	"Apologize"	Timbaland presents OneRepublic	"Neujahrskonzert 2008"	Georges Prêtre / Vienna Philharmonic
25 January	"Bleeding Love"	Leona Lewis	"Neujahrskonzert 2008"	Georges Prêtre / Vienna Philharmonic
1 February	"Bleeding Love"	Leona Lewis	"Neujahrskonzert 2008"	Georges Prêtre / Vienna Philharmonic
8 February	"Bleeding Love"	Leona Lewis	"Spirit"	Leona Lewis
15 February	"Bleeding Love"	Leona Lewis	"Symphonic"	Falco
22 February	"Bleeding Love"	Leona Lewis	"Symphonic"	Falco
29 February	"Bleeding Love"	Leona Lewis	"Back to Black"	Amy Winehouse
7 March	"Kuschel Song"	Schnuffel	"Back to Black"	Amy Winehouse
14 March	"Kuschel Song"	Schnuffel	"Back to Black"	Amy Winehouse
21 March	"Kuschel Song"	Schnuffel	"Back to Black"	Amy Winehouse
28 March	"Kuschel Song"	Schnuffel	"Back to Black"	Amy Winehouse
4 April	"Kuschel Song"	Schnuffel	"Back to Black"	Amy Winehouse
11 April	"Kuschel Song"	Schnuffel	"Back to Black"	Amy Winehouse
18 April	"Mercy"	Duffy	"laut-Los"	Christina Stürmer
25 April	"Mercy"	Duffy	"laut-Los"	Christina Stürmer
2 May	"Mercy"	Duffy	"laut-Los"	Christina Stürmer
9 May	"Mercy"	Duffy	"Hard Candy"	Madonna
16 May	"Mercy"	Duffy	"laut-Los"	Christina Stürmer
23 May	"Mercy"	Duffy	"Back to Black"	Amy Winehouse
30 May	"Mercy"	Duffy	"Ich hab' dich lieb"	Schnuffel
6 June	"Love Is You"	Thomas Godoj	"Chant: Music For Paradise"	The Cistercian Monks of Stift Heiligenkreuz
13 June	"Love Is You"	Thomas Godoj	"Chant: Music For Paradise"	The Cistercian Monks of Stift Heiligenkreuz
20 June	"All Summer Long"	Kid Rock	"Chant: Music For Paradise"	The Cistercian Monks of Stift Heiligenkreuz
27 June	"All Summer Long"	Kid Rock	"Viva la Vida or Death and All His Friends"	Coldplay
4 July	"All Summer Long"	Kid Rock	"Viva la Vida or Death and All His Friends"	Coldplay
11 July	"All Summer Long"	Kid Rock	"Viva la Vida or Death and All His Friends"	Coldplay
18 July	"All Summer Long"	Kid Rock	"Plan A!"	Thomas Godoj
25 July	"All Summer Long"	Kid Rock	"Ich dich auch"	Nockalm Quintett
1 August	"All Summer Long"	Kid Rock	"Mamma Mia! The Movie Soundtrack"	Cast of Mamma Mia!
8 August	"All Summer Long"	Kid Rock	"Mamma Mia! The Movie Soundtrack"	Cast of Mamma Mia!
15 August	"All Summer Long"	Kid Rock	"Mamma Mia! The Movie Soundtrack"	Cast of Mamma Mia!
22 August	"All Summer Long"	Kid Rock	"Mamma Mia! The Movie Soundtrack"	Cast of Mamma Mia!
29 August	"I Kissed a Girl"	Katy Perry	"Mamma Mia! The Movie Soundtrack"	Cast of Mamma Mia!
5 September	"I Kissed a Girl"	Katy Perry	"Mamma Mia! The Movie Soundtrack"	Cast of Mamma Mia!
12 September	"I Kissed a Girl"	Katy Perry	"King of Pop"	Michael Jackson
19 September	"I Kissed a Girl"	Katy Perry	"King of Pop"	Michael Jackson
26 September	"I Kissed a Girl"	Katy Perry	"Death Magnetic"	Metallica
3 October	"This Is The Life"	Amy Macdonald	"Death Magnetic"	Metallica
10 October	"This Is The Life"	Amy Macdonald	"Die Suche geht weiter"	Rosenstolz
17 October	"This Is The Life"	Amy Macdonald	"Chant: Music For Paradise"	The Cistercian Monks of Stift Heiligenkreuz
24 October	"So What"	Pink	"Chant: Music For Paradise"	The Cistercian Monks of Stift Heiligenkreuz
31 October	"So What"	Pink	"Black Ice"	AC/DC
7 November	"So What"	Pink	"Soundtrack"	High School Musical 3: Senior Year
14 November	"So What"	Pink	"Vol. 14"	Kiddy Contest
21 November	"So What"	Pink	"Vol. 14"	Kiddy Contest
28 November	"So What"	Pink	"Vol. 14"	Kiddy Contest
5 December	"Hot n Cold"	Katy Perry	"Was muss muss – Best of"	Herbert Grönemeyer
12 December	"Hot n Cold"	Katy Perry	"Vol. 14"	Kiddy Contest
19 December	"Hot n Cold"	Katy Perry	"Was muss muss – Best of"	Herbert Grönemeyer
26 December	No Top 40 released			
