= Lucy Hood =

Lucy Hood may refer to:

- Lucy Hood (media executive) (1958–2014), American founder and executive director of Fox Mobile Entertainment
- Lucy Hood (politician), Australian politician, journalist, and former political adviser
