= Ich hab' Dich lieb =

Studio album by Schnuffel
- Released: 9 May 2008
- Genres: Pop; Eurodance; children's; novelty
- Length: 51:16
- Language: German
- Label: Columbia
- Producer: Markus Kretschmer

Schnuffel chronology
Ich hab' Dich lieb (2008)	Winterwunderland (2008)

Singles from Ich hab' Dich lieb
- 1. "Kuschel Song" Released: 8 February 2008; 2. "Ich hab' Dich lieb" Released: 4 July 2008; 3. "Häschenparty" Released: 19 September 2008

Ich hab' Dich lieb (English: I Love You) is the debut studio album by German animated character Schnuffel. It was released in Germany on 9 May 2008 by Columbia Records. After the album was certified gold in Germany for shipments in excess of 100,000 copies, a gold edition was released on 10 October 2008, including two bonus versions of "Häschenparty" and three music videos. In the United Kingdom, Ich hab' Dich lieb was released digitally on 30 September 2009, replacing the "Kuschel Song" music video with the bonus track "Für mich bist du das Schönste".

== Composition ==
The opening and title track of the album "Ich hab' Dich lieb" (English: I love you), was released as the album's second single on 4 July 2008. The CD-single sold over 50,000 copies.

A remix of "Häschenparty" (German for "Bunny party"; also known as Bunnyparty) featuring Michael Wendler was released as its third single on 19 September 2008. It was also released as a Maxi-CD on the same date. On 20 September 2008, a live concert took place in the KöPi-Arena in Oberhausen, Germany, featuring a person dressed as Schnuffel "performing" the song live with Wendler. The single is also present in a digital release called "Häschenparty - Famous 5" (released on 24 October 2008), together with the original version. The latter is the only version of the song included in the original album, while the remix featuring Wendler that was released as a single is featured inside the Gold Edition release. "ZEILT Productions" was the producer of the 3D animation as seen in the official music video. The original version of the song is a popular subject of nightcore edits.

== Track listing ==
No.	Title	Lyrics	Music	Translation	Length
1.	"Ich hab' Dich lieb"	Markus Kretschmer, Tamara Lücke	Lücke	"I Love You"	3:24
2.	"Kuschel Song" (Single Version)	Andreas Marek-Wendorf, Sebastian Nussbaum	Jamba!	"Cuddle Song"	2:50
3.	"Hab' dich gern"	Andreas John, Erik Macholl, Mitch Kelly	John, Macholl, Kelly	"I Like You"	2:50
4.	"Wir gehören zusammen"	Kretschmer, Lücke	Lücke	"We Belong Together"	4:12
5.	"Du bist mein allerliebster Freund"	Kretschmer, Lücke	Lücke	"You Are My Dearest Friend"	3:16
6.	"Schnucki Putzi"	John, Macholl, Kelly	John, Macholl, Kelly	"Sweetie Pie"	2:18
7.	"Ich will zu Dir"	Kretschmer, Lücke	Lücke	"I Want to Be with You"	4:29
8.	"Wo bist Du hingegangen"	Kretschmer, Lücke	Lücke	"Where Did You Go"	4:10
9.	"Häschenparty" (Album Version)	Sam Francis, Susan Rafael	Francis, Rafael	"Bunny Party"	2:42
10.	"Alles Gute"	Thomas Preuß, Andreas Marek-Wendorf	Thomas Preuß, Andreas Marek-Wendorf	"Happy Birthday"	3:07
11.	"Bleib heute Nacht bei mir"	Thomas Preuß, Andreas Marek-Wendorf	Thomas Preuß, Andreas Marek-Wendorf	"Stay with Me Tonight"	3:49
12.	"Schlaf schön mein Schatz"	Thomas Preuß, Andreas Marek-Wendorf	Thomas Preuß, Andreas Marek-Wendorf	"Sleep Well My Darling"	3:18
13.	"Bitte komm doch wieder"	Kretschmer, Lücke	Lücke	"Please Come Again"	4:08
14.	"Tausend Küsschen"	Kretschmer, Lücke	Lücke	"One Thousand Kisses"	3:23
15.	"Komm mich knuddeln"	Timo Schulz, Andreas Schulz	T. Schulz, A. Schulz	"Come Hug Me"	2:55
16.	"Kuschel Song" (video; only seen when CD is played on computer or DVD player)			"Cuddle Song"	2:50

UK digital bonus track
No.	Title	Lyrics	Music	Translation	Length
16.	"Für mich bist du das Schönste"	Kretschmer, Lücke	Lücke	"For Me You're the Most Beautiful"	4:14

Gold Edition bonus tracks
No.	Title	Lyrics	Music	Length
16.	"Häschenparty" (Single Version featuring Michael Wendler)	Francis, Rafael	Francis, Rafael, Mic Skowy	3:09
17.	"Häschenparty" (Disco Maxi Mix featuring Michael Wendler)	Francis, Rafael, Skowy	Francis, Rafael, Skowy	3:46
18.	"Kuschel Song" (Single Version – video)			2:49
19.	"Ich hab' Dich lieb" (video)			3:23
20.	"Häschenparty" (video featuring Michael Wendler)			3:09

International editions

- 2008: Szívemből szól (I speak with my heart) – Hungarian version by Snufi. It excludes the tracks "Alles Gute", "Bleib heute Nacht bei mir" and "Schlaf schön mein Schatz", while adding the bonus track "Für mich bist du das Schönste" as the eleventh track. It also includes the "Kuschel Song" video.
- 2008: Gosto de ti (I like you) – Portuguese version by Orelhinhas Schnuffel. It excludes the tracks "Wo bist Du hingegangen", "Alles Gute", "Bleib heute Nacht bei mir", "Schlaf schön mein Schatz" and "Bitte komm doch wieder", while adding the instrumental versions of "Ich hab' Dich lieb", "Kuschel Song", "Hab' dich gern" and "Häschenparty".
- 2009: Le monde magique de Lapin Câlin (The magic world of Lapin Câlin) – French version by Lapin Câlin. It excludes the tracks "Alles Gute", "Bleib heute Nacht bei mir" and "Schlaf schön mein Schatz", while adding the bonus track "Für mich bist du das Schönste" as the eleventh track. Also, "Kuschel Song" is the first track, "Häschenparty" is the second, and "Ich hab' Dich lieb" is the ninth. It also includes the "Häschenparty" video.

== Charts ==
=== Weekly charts ===
Album (2008)	Peak position
Austrian Albums (Ö3 Austria)	1
European Albums (Billboard)	37
German Albums (Offizielle Top 100)	11
Hungarian Albums (MAHASZ)	6
Swiss Albums (Schweizer Hitparade)	50

"Häschenparty" (2008)	Peak position
Austrian Singles Chart	29
European Singles Chart	24
German Singles Chart	16
French Singles Chart	29

"Ich hab' Dich lieb" (2008)	Peak position
Austria (Ö3 Austria Top 40)	13
Switzerland (Schweizer Hitparade)	80

=== Year-end charts ===
Chart (2008)	Position
Austrian Albums (Ö3 Austria)	31
German Albums (Offizielle Top 100)	62
Hungarian Albums (MAHASZ)	39

== Certifications ==
Region	Certification	Certified units/sales
Austria (IFPI Austria)	Gold	10,000^{*}
Germany (BVMI)	Gold	100,000^{^}
^{*} Sales figures based on certification alone.^{^} Shipments figures based on certification alone.
