= Vernon Irvin =

American businessman (born 1962)

Vernon L Irvin (born near Pittsburgh) currently works as EVP and chief revenue officer at Everbridge one of the fastest growing publicly traded Saas companies in the world. Irvin was formerly President of the Government, Education, Medium & Small Business business unit within CenturyLink. Prior to CenturyLink, he served in several executive positions at Time Warner Cable, CEO and president at Virtual World Computing and was executive vice president and chief marketing officer for XM Satellite Radio.

He previously held positions at MCI; later he worked VeriSign, where he oversaw the company's telecommunications unit.

== Biography ==
Born in the Pittsburgh suburb of Braddock, Pennsylvania, one of three children of a US Steel worker and a beauty care lecturer, Irvin attended Swissvale High .

He moved into computing positions in the telecommunications industry, and then into senior management positions with several major communications companies, including MFS UUNET, Ameritech, and MCI. Irvin progressed from MCI sales into its marketing team, where he was part of the group that created "Friends & Family" as an economic way of driving revenues to MCI's relatively unknown network against AT&T. He then moved back to Ameritech before a brief stint WorldCom,

After a short stint at internet company e.spire Communications, Irvin was approached by Alfred Mockett and accepted in May 1999 the position of President of the Content and Media Hosting division of BT Ignite, the broadband and Internet services business of British Telecommunications, plc. Tasked with building a content hosting and media proposition from a poorly developed and wholly UK-centric base, Irvin built the division into a $500 million applications infrastructure business with more than 2,000 employees by buying key assets in France and Germany, and developing a set of world class standards.

However, to build the division Irvin's team needed cash, and after the fallout of the dot.com boom and the drastic need to restructure BT in light of colossal debt, Irvin left BT. He again joined Mockett at American Management Systems (AMS) in February 2002, a business and IT consulting firm whose business at the time was mainly US Government driven, where he was the executive vice president of the global communications, media and entertainment division. Irvin was tasked with curtailing the company's declining revenues in its communications practice, where he commented at the time: "I believe that the victors in this new challenge will be the ones that understand how to evolve from traditional long distance revenues into a more Internet-centric, wireless-centric, content-centric world."

=== VeriSign and Jamster ===
VeriSign is an Internet security company that added, through acquisitions, series of product lines which connect mobile network companies' text message networks together securely - in 2004, about 3 billion transactions per day. VeriSign CEO Stratton Sclavos recognised that with VoIP products developing, the revenues could decrease. Irvin was hired as executive vice president and general manager of VeriSign's Communications Services division.

In late 2004, VeriSign bought a relatively small Berlin-based company called Jamba for $270 million. Jamba built mobile applications, games, ringtones and wallpaper, and was also in over 40 countries worldwide. The VeriSign team had recognised that there were twice as many mobile phones than computers, which also had inbuilt computer technology. Effectively, VeriSign now had a new content distribution platform which also integrated with the internet, which was both secure and auditable - now all they needed was the content.

While Irvin sourced content, Jamba became Jamster in the United States. Irvin struck a deal with Kevin Liles, President of Warner Music Group, to provide mobile consumers with early access to hip-hop artist Mike Jones' debut album "Who Is Mike Jones?" - in return, Jones created the first artist-endorsed Jamster ring-tone advertisement in the US. When "Who is Mike Jones" was released it debuted among the top 5 albums on the Billboard charts and went on to sell over a million copies. The Crazy Frog ring tone did the same in Europe.

Jamba/Jamster boomed - when VeriSign bought the business, it was making $15 million per quarter and 3 quarters later it was making $150 million a quarter - in 2005 the company made close to $600 million in revenue. VeriSign expanded Jamba/Jamster by the acquisitions of UNC-Embratel and Unimobile. Jamster also added to its revenues by adding "impulse purchasing" - when you downloaded one ringtone, you were offered others. This turned into interactive advertising, for which the mobile owner was charged, sometimes unknowingly. Controversy followed these services, including investigations in the United States and Europe that led to Jamba/Jamster's sale from VeriSign.

On 12 September 2006, News Corporation announced it will pay approximately $188 million for 51% shares in Jamba! and will combine it with Fox Mobile Entertainment assets. On 23 October 2006 it was announced that Irvin would join XM Satellite Radio as chief marketing officer.

=== Other positions ===
Mr. Irvin serves on the boards of Reuters America and the William and Mary School of Business and the Boys and Girls Clubs of Silicon Valley. He formerly served on the Board of the CTIA–The Wireless Association and the University of Southern California's Center for Telecom Management and serves on the Network Reliability and Interoperability Council, collaborating with public safety and federal agencies and the communications industry on homeland security and emergency network issues.
