= Deutschland sucht den Superstar season 18 =

Season of television series

Deutschland sucht den Superstar
- Season 18
- Hosted by: Oliver Geissen
- Judges: Dieter Bohlen (Auditions and 'Recall'); Mike Singer; Maite Kelly; Michael Wendler (Auditions episode 1); Thomas Gottschalk (Live Shows)
- Winner: Jan-Marten Block
- Runner-up: Karl Jeroboan

Release
- Original network: RTL
- Original release: 5 January – 3 April 2021

Season chronology
- ← Previous; Season 17 Next → Season 19

The eighteenth season of Deutschland sucht den Superstar began on 5 January 2021 on RTL. the jury consisted of Dieter Bohlen only for auditions and "Recalls" Mike Singer, Maite Kelly and Michael Wendler; Wendler was excluded after the first audition because of his statements about the COVID-19 outbreak in Germany. Before the live shows began, Dieter Bohlen was excluded from the jury, his place took Thomas Gottschalk. Oliver Geissen returned as the host. For the first time all top 4 consists of male competitors. This time, the live shows took place at the Landschaftspark Duisburg-Nord. Jan Marten-Block was announced as the winner of the season.

== Finalists ==
| Place | Contestant | Age | Hometown | Occupation | Status |
|---|---|---|---|---|---|
| 1 | Jan-Marten Block | 25 | Süderlügum | Apprentice (businessman in e-commerce) | Winner |
| 2 | Karl Jeroboan | 30 | Düren | Sports and health trainer | Runner-up |
| 3 | Kevin Jenewein | 27 | Sulzbach/Saar | Carpenter | Eliminated in Round 2 Grand Finale |
| 4 | Starian Dwayne McCoy | 19 | Uhingen | Courier driver | Eliminated in Round 1 Grand Finale |
| 5 | Pia-Sophie Remmel | 20 | Remscheid | Student | Eliminated; Semi-Final |
| 6 | Michelle Patz | 21 | Dietzhölztal | Musician and actress | Eliminated; Semi-Final |
| 7 | Jan Böckmann | 29 | Garthe | Bricklayer and plasterer | Eliminated; Semi-Final |
| 8 | Daniele Puccia | 19 | Wuppertal | Student | Eliminated; Semi-Final |
| 9 | Daniel "Ludi" Ludwig | 24 | Köln | Photographer and make-up artist | Eliminated; Semi-Final |

== Live shows/Elimination chart ==
| Females | Males | Top 9 | Winner | Runner-up |

| Safe | Most votes | Safe Last | Eliminated |

| Stage: | | Semi-Final | Finals |
| Week: | | 3/27 | 4/3 |
| Place | Contestant | Result | |
| 1 | Jan-Marten Block | 2nd 19.33% | Winner; 33.38% |
| 2 | Karl Jeroboan | 3rd 17.71% | Runner-up; 28.21% |
| 3 | Kevin Jenewein | 1st 23.32% | 3rd 25.81% |
| 4 | Starian Dwayne McCoy | 4th 8.48% | 4th 12.60% |
| 5 | Pia-Sophie Remmel | 5th 7.95% | |
| 6 | Michelle Patz | 6th 7.93% | |
| 7 | Jan Böckmann | 7th 7.28% | |
| 8 | Daniele Puccia | 8th 5.55% | |
| 9 | Daniel "Ludi" Ludwig | 9th 2.45% | |

Color key

| Contestant received the fewest votes and was eliminated |
| Contestant was in the bottom six |
| Contestant received the most votes from the public |
| Contestant was announced as the season's winner |
| Contestant was announced as the runner-up |

=== Week 1 - Semi-Final: Top 9 ===
Original airdate: 27 March 2021

| Order | Contestant | Song | Result | Voting result |
|---|---|---|---|---|
| 1 | Karl Jeroboan | "Leave a Light On" | Safe | 17.71% (3/9) |
| 2 | Jan-Marten Block | "Kiss from a Rose" | Safe | 19.33% (2/9) |
| 3 | Starian Dwayne McCoy | "Earned It" | Bottom Six | 8.48% (4/9) |
| 4 | Pia-Sophie Remmel | "Let's Love" | Eliminated | 7.95% (5/9) |
| 5 | Daniel "Ludi" Ludwig | "Attention" | Eliminated | 2.45% (9/9) |
| 6 | Michelle Patz | "Treppenhaus" | Eliminated | 7.93% (6/9) |
| 7 | Daniele Puccia | "Dynamite" | Eliminated | 5.55% (8/9) |
| 8 | Jan Böckmann | "Ungeschminkt" | Eliminated | 7.28% (7/9) |
| 9 | Kevin Jenewein | "Right Here Waiting" | Safe | 23.32% (1/9) |

=== Week 2 - Final: Top 4 (Solo song, Favorite performance & Winner's single) ===
Original airdate: 3 April 2021

- The final result was announced after all four contestants performed their three songs.

| Order | Contestant | Song | Result | Voting result |
|---|---|---|---|---|
| 1 | Karl Jeroboan | "Way Down We Go" – Kaleo | Runner-Up | 28.21% (2/4) |
| 1 | Karl Jeroboan | "It's a Man's Man's Man's World" – James Brown | Runner-Up | 28.21% (2/4) |
| 1 | Karl Jeroboan | "Where We Were" – Karl Jeroboan | Runner-Up | 28.21% (2/4) |
| 2 | Jan-Marten Block | "Bruises" – Lewis Capaldi | Winner | 33.38% (1/4) |
| 2 | Jan-Marten Block | "Human" – Rag'n'Bone Man | Winner | 33.38% (1/4) |
| 2 | Jan-Marten Block | "Never Not Try" – Jan-Marten Block | Winner | 33.38% (1/4) |
| 3 | Starian Dwayne McCoy | "Treat You Better" – Shawn Mendes | Eliminated in Round 1 | 12.60% (4/4) |
| 3 | Starian Dwayne McCoy | "Perfect" – Ed Sheeran | Eliminated in Round 1 | 12.60% (4/4) |
| 3 | Starian Dwayne McCoy | "Hold On" – Starian Dwayne McCoy | Eliminated in Round 1 | 12.60% (4/4) |
| 4 | Kevin Jenewein | "Locked Out of Heaven" – Bruno Mars | Eliminated in Round 2 | 25.81% (3/4) |
| 4 | Kevin Jenewein | "Breathe Easy" – Blue | Eliminated in Round 2 | 25.81% (3/4) |
| 4 | Kevin Jenewein | "Hurricane" – Kevin Jenewein | Eliminated in Round 2 | 25.81% (3/4) |
