= 4Players =

German online magazine for video games

- Website type: Video game journalism
- Owner: 4Players GmbH
- Editor: Mathias Oertel
- Website: 4p.de
- Registration: Optional
- Launched: August 2000; 26 years ago

4P, formerly known as 4Players, is a German online magazine that provides news and reviews of video games and related content. Established in August 2000, 4Players is owned by the Hamburg-based company 4Players GmbH, an indirect subsidiary of the Marquard Group conglomerate.

== History ==
The company 4Players GmbH was established in May 2000 by the internet agency Active Newmedia GmbH in association with Freenet AG. 4Players GmbH subsequently launched the website 4Players in August that year. Freenet sold 4Players GmbH to Computec Media in December 2012, with the purchase taking effect on 1 January 2013. On 30 June 2020, Computec Media owner Marquard Group transferred 4Players GmbH to 4Players AG, a newly formed Aktiengesellschaft in Switzerland owned directly by Marquard Group. The conglomerate stated that it expected "extraordinary expansion" of 4Players as a result of the move. However, the site announced in August 2021 that it was to close on 31 October 2021. Consequently, 40 of 4Player GmbH's 50 employees would be laid off, while the remainder would continue to operate the company's other businesses, including the game server hosting service 4Netplayers, the communication software Odin, and the multiplayer tool Scill. Shortly after the last article was published, 4Players AG announced that there had been multiple offers to continue operating the site. Reporting resumed on 11 November with Mathias Oertel as the acting editor and several freelances who nominally work for Computec as writers.

In 2024, the site was rebranded simply as "4P", with the magazine sold as "4P - Das Spielemagazin".

== Features ==
4Players provides news, reviews and downloads for various video games platform. The mainpage is split into sections for every platform the portal covers: PC, PS4, Xbox One, Wii U, VR and handhelds. Additionally 4Players providers coverage around the general video games community, eSports, a tips section, an internet forum as well as a video section with video reviews. The portal also provides additional features such as an iPhone and android app as well as a teamspeak server service.

== Reception ==
As of February 2016, 4Players was one of the largest German online video gaming portals, with about 7 million page impressions and 801.000 unique visits per month.

In 2008, 4Players was one of the main reviewers of Atari's new game Alone in the Dark which were threatened with legal action after they gave the game a mediocre rating. 4Players was accused of obtaining an illegal version of the game before it was released and Atari wanted to force 4Players to pull the review from their webpage. At the same time Atari also cancelled an advertising campaign on the 4Players website, which was interpreted as applying further pressure on the online portal. This garnered an enormous media echo nationally and internationally, which forced Atari to row back on its demands, and both 4Players and Atari were able to settle differences out of court.
