= Lucy Hood (media executive) =

American businesswoman (1957–2014)

- Born: Lucille Anne Hood; January 27, 1958; Manhattan, New York, United States
- Died: April 2, 2014 (aged 56); Los Angeles, California, United States
- Education: Yale University
- Occupation: Media executive
- Known for: Founder of Fox Mobile Entertainment

Lucille Anne Hood (January 27, 1958 – April 2, 2014), commonly known as Lucy Hood, was the founder of Fox Mobile Entertainment and the Executive Director of the Institute for Communication Technology Management (CTM) at the University of Southern California. Hood guided the institute's strategy and its consortium of corporate members, which include AT&T, Verizon, Hewlett-Packard, Cisco, Qualcomm, Motorola Mobility, Alcatel-Lucent, Disney, Fox and Ogilvy & Mather. Hood was also a member of the faculty at USC's Marshall School of Business.

== Career ==
Hood began her career at News Corporation in the mid-1990s, rising through the group's HarperCollins publishing arm, latterly as senior VP, entertainment publishing; before taking the newly created post of senior VP and general manager of TV Guide in June 1999.

Hood then became a key executive in launching technology businesses at News Corporation including Fox Pay Television, Fox.com, FX Cable, and News Corp Content Group. Hood then became president of Fox Mobile Entertainment, which she founded in 2005. During this time Hood achieved many industry firsts, including leading the North American groundbreaking mobile services for American Idol, which introduced text messaging to the mass population in the United States. Hood also received the only Emmy nomination for mobile content with the mobile video series 24: Conspiracy, and led the team that created the program format of video "mobisodes," short-form 3G mobile content; and the first ad-sponsored mobile video.

Hood was appointed CEO of Jamba! in September 2006 after spearheading News Corporation's efforts to acquire a controlling interest from VeriSign. Hood resigned from both Jamba and News Corp on October 10, 2007.

In 2009, Hood was appointed executive director for the Institute for Communication Technology Management (CTM) at the University of Southern California. She focused CTM's activities on "the intersection of technology and content", launching a "How Much Media?" study in 2011 to analyze where consumer media innovation and consumption is headed between 2011 and 2015.

Hood was nominated as "Visionary of the Year" for the Digital Entertainment & Media Excellence Awards. She was a member of the GSM, CTIA and Natpe boards, as well as a member of the Academy of Television Arts and Sciences. She gave presentations at major industry events such as CES, Mobile World Congress, CTIA, the Milken Global Conference, and Aspen Institute.

== Personal life ==
Born in Manhattan in 1958, Hood gained a B.A. degree in English and Theatre from Yale University, and held an M.B.A. from Columbia University's Graduate School of Business.

Hood lived in Los Angeles with her husband and two children, a daughter, and a son. Hood died of cancer in Los Angeles on April 2, 2014, at the age of 56.
