= Deutschland sucht den Superstar season 19 =

Deutschland sucht den Superstar
- Season 19
- Hosted by: Marco Schreyl
- Judges: Florian Silbereisen; Ilse DeLange; Toby Gad
- Winner: Harry Marcello Laffontien
- Runner-up: Amber van den Elzen

Release
- Original network: RTL
- Original release: 22 January – 7 May 2022

Season chronology
- ← Previous; Season 18

The nineteenth season of Deutschland sucht den Superstar began on 22 January 2022 on RTL. The jury consisted of Florian Silbereisen, Ilse DeLange and Toby Gad. The contract with Dieter Bohlen as a juror was not extended by RTL and after 18 seasons Bohlen was not in the jury. Marco Schreyl became the new host.

The guest judge in the first live show was Thomas Anders; in the second live show, Sarah Lombardi; and in the third and fourth, Let's Dance judge Joachim Llambi.

Harry Marcello Laffontien won the competition with 73,10% of the public votes, the third highest percentage win on the show.

== Finalists ==
Place	Contestant	Age	Hometown	Occupation	Status
1	Harry Marcello Laffontien	21	Hiddenhausen	Artist	Winner
2	Amber van den Elzen	20	Gemert, Netherlands	Student	Runner-up
3	Melissa Mantzoukis	18	Ingolstadt	Trainee	Eliminated in Round 2 Grand Finale
4	Gianni Laffontien	17	Hiddenhausen	Artist	Eliminated in Round 1 Grand Finale
5	Dominik Simmen	22	Kiel	Psychology student	Eliminated; Semi-Final
6	Melissa Turan	23	Wiesloch	Make-up artist	Eliminated; Semi-Final
7	Din Omerhodzic	24	Frankfurt am Main	Medical student	Eliminated; Live Show 2
8	Tina Umbricht	23	Gränichen, Switzerland	Worker in a cell phone store	Eliminated; Live Show 2
9	Abigail Nova Campos	17	Leipzig	Student	Eliminated; Live Show 1
10	Domenico Tarantino	24	Hamburg	Employee in a bank	Eliminated; Live Show 1

== Live shows ==
Color key

Contestant lost the pre-voting and was eliminated
Contestant was in the bottom three
Contestant received the fewest votes and was eliminated
Contestant received the most votes from the public
Contestant was announced as the season's winner
Contestant was announced as the runner-up

=== Week 1: Top 10 - 1980s songs ===
Original airdate: 16 April

- Pre-voting

Contestant	Song	Result	Voting result
Dominik Simmen	"Rebel Yell"	Advanced	77.15%
Emine Knapczyk	"Rebel Yell"	Eliminated	22.85%

Order	Contestant	Song	Result	Voting result
1	Melissa Turan	"Beat It"	Safe	5,81% (7/10)
2	Abigail Nova Campos	"I Wanna Dance with Somebody (Who Loves Me)"	Eliminated	4,38% (9/10)
3	Gianni Laffontien	"Hold Me Now"	Safe	11,22% (3/10)
4	Domenico Tarantino	"Maniac"	Eliminated	2,70% (10/10)
5	Amber van den Elzen	"Right Here Waiting"	Safe	15,72% (2/10)
6	Din Omerhodzic	"Halt mich"	Safe	8,93% (6/10)
7	Tina Umbricht	"Kids in America"	Bottom three	4,48% (8/10)
8	Harry Marcello Laffontien	"How Am I Supposed to Live Without You"	Safe	25,03% (1/10)
9	Melissa Mantzoukis	"Holding Out for a Hero"	Safe	11,14% (4/10)
10	Dominik Simmen	"Take On Me"	Safe	10,59% (5/10)

=== Week 2: Top 8 - Movie Night ===
Original airdate: 23 April

Order	Contestant	Song	Movie	Result	Voting result
1	Melissa Turan	"Lady Marmalade"	Moulin Rouge!	Safe	9,82% (5/8)
2	Gianni Laffontien	"Oh, Pretty Woman"	Pretty Woman	Safe	13,02% (4/8)
3	Amber van den Elzen	"Shallow"	A Star is Born	Safe	18,17% (3/8)
4	Din Omerhodzic	"She's Like the Wind"	Dirty Dancing	Eliminated	6,66% (7/8)
5	Tina Umbricht	"Crazy in Love" (Remix)	Fifty Shades of Grey	Eliminated	4,43% (8/8)
6	Harry Marcello Laffontien	"I'm Still Standing"	Rocketman	Safe	22,33% (1/8)
7	Melissa Mantzoukis	"Never Enough"	The Greatest Showman	Safe	18,37% (2/8)
8	Dominik Simmen	"What I've Done"	Transformers	Bottom three	7,20% (6/8)

=== Week 3 - Semi-Final: Top 6 - The Power of Love ===
Original airdate: 30 April

Order	Contestant	Song	Result	Voting result
1	Melissa Turan	"Domino"	Eliminated	6,80% (6/6)
2	Gianni Laffontien	"She"	Bottom three	15,47% (4/6)
3	Amber van den Elzen	"Desperado"	Safe	17,66% (2/6)
4	Dominik Simmen	"Use Somebody"	Eliminated	10,28% (5/6)
5	Harry Marcello Laffontien	"When a Man Loves a Woman"	Safe	34,13% (1/6)
6	Melissa Mantzoukis	"Runnin' (Lose It All)"	Safe	15,66% (3/6)
Duette (Duets)
7	Melissa Turan & Gianni Laffontien	"Feeling Good"	—	
8	Amber van den Elzen & Dominik Simmen	"You're the One That I Want"	—	
9	Harry Marcello Laffontien & Melissa Mantzoukis	"You Are The Reason"	—	

=== Week 4 - Final: Top 4 - Season Highlight Song/favourite Song/Winner's Single ===
Original airdate: 7 May

Order	Contestant	Song (Season highlight Song)	Song (Favourite Song)	Result	Voting result	Winner's single	Result	Voting result
1	Gianni Laffontien	"It's Not Unusual"	"Burning Love"	Eliminated in Round 1	13,09% (4/4)	N/A (already eliminated)		
2	Amber van den Elzen	"The House of the Rising Sun"	"Islands in the Stream"	Safe	21,17% (2/4)	"Someone to Love"	Runner-up	26,90% (2/2)
3	Harry Marcello Laffontien	"(Your Love Keeps Lifting Me) Higher & Higher"	"If You Don't Know Me by Now"	Safe	49,01% (1/4)	"Someone to Love"	Winner	73,10% (1/2)
4	Melissa Mantzoukis	"What I Did for Love"	"Stone Cold"	Eliminated in Round 2	16,73% (3/4)	N/A (already eliminated)		

== Elimination chart ==
Females	Males	Top 10	Winner	Runner-up

Safe	Most votes	Safe Last	Eliminated

Stage:		Top 11	Top 8	Semi-Final - Top 6	Finals - Top 4	
Week:		4/16	4/23	4/30	5/7	
Place	Contestant	Result				
1	Harry Marcello Laffontien	1st 25,03%	1st 22,33%	1st 34,13%	1st 49,01%	Winner; 73,10%
2	Amber van den Elzen	2nd 15,72%	3rd 18,17%	2nd 17,66%	2nd 21,17%	Runner-up; 26,90%
3	Melissa Mantzoukis	4th 11,14%	2nd 18,37%	3rd 15,66%	3rd 16,73%	
4	Gianni Laffontien	3rd 11,22%	4th 13,02%	4th 15,47%	4th 13,09%	
5	Dominik Simmen	5th 10,59%	6th 7,20%	5th 10,28%		
6	Melissa Turan	7th 5,81%	5th 9,82%	6th 6,80%		
7	Din Omerhodzic	6th 8,93%	7th 6,66%			
8	Tina Umbricht	8th 4,48%	8th 4,43%			
9	Abigail Nova Campos	9th 4,38%				
10	Domenico Tarantino	10th 2,70%				
