= Hit Masters =

Karaoke company (2008–2012)

- Genres: Pop
- Years active: 2008–2012
- Label: Hit Masters

Hit Masters was a karaoke company.

In 2008, they released a version of the Kid Rock song "All Summer Long" to the iTunes Store in North America. Due to Kid Rock's decision to withhold his music from the iTunes market, sales from the karaoke version eventually caused it to overtake Kid Rock's original on the Billboard Hot 100 in the United States, peaking at number 19. This version also peaked at number 28 on the Canadian Hot 100 due to digital downloads. As Rock's version remained in the top 30 based on radio airplay alone, Hit Masters jumped into the top 20 due to its sales strength. However, the radio success of "All Summer Long" propelled Rock N Roll Jesus back up to number two on the Billboard 200, nearly a year after its release.

In 2012, a pre-release cover version of Carly Rae Jepsen's "Call Me Maybe" charted at No. 72 on the UK Singles Chart.

== Discography ==
Song	Original artist	Chart position			Year
Song	Original artist	CAN	UK	US	Year
"All Summer Long"	Kid Rock	28	-	19	2008
"Call Me Maybe"	Carly Rae Jepsen	-	72	-	2012
