= Jamba! =

Organization

Jamba
- Formerly: Jamba!
- Type: Mobile content provider
- Founded: 2000
- Founder: Oliver Samwer
- Website: Jamba.de

Jamba (formerly Jamba!) is a German company that created and marketed ringtones for mobile phones. It has operated under the name Jamster in Australia, New Zealand, China, Armenia, Georgia, Saudi Arabia, Iran, Oman, France, Kuwait, Turkey, Switzerland, Kazakhstan, Austria, Brazil, Israel, the United Arab Emirates, the United Kingdom, the United States, Puerto Rico, Canada, Sweden, Iraq, Poland, Malaysia, Indonesia and Russia. They are very well known for their many ringtone characters including Crazy Frog, Gummibär, Holly Dolly, René la Taupe, Schnuffel Bunny, and Psycho Teddy.

== History ==
The company was founded in Berlin's Kreuzberg district in 2000.

VeriSign was a successful internet security company that had a series of product lines that connected mobile network companies' text message networks together securely, processing about 3 billion per day in 2004. VeriSign CEO Stratton Sclavos recognised that with VoIP products developing, the revenues could decrease, and so he hired Vernon Irvin as Executive Vice President and General Manager of VeriSign's Communications Services division to solve the problem. Irvin saw good but technical and expensive products, but saw the volumes of exchange over the system as the solution.

In late 2004, under Irvin's direction, VeriSign bought Jamba for $270 million. Jamba at the time built mobile applications, games, ringtones and wallpapers, and was also in over 40 countries worldwide. The VeriSign team had recognised that there were twice as many mobile phones as there were computers, which also had built-in computer technology. Effectively, VeriSign now had a new content distribution platform which also integrated with the internet, which was both secure and auditable—now all they needed was the content.

VeriSign relocated Jamba's HQ Office to prestige premises in the Dom Aquarée building near Alexanderplatz in the centre of Berlin.

In 2005, Jamba started doing business in China.

While Irvin sourced content, Jamba became Jamster in the United States. Irvin struck a deal with Kevin Liles, President of Warner Music Group, to provide mobile consumers with early access to hip-hop artist Mike Jones' debut album "Who Is Mike Jones?"—in return, Jones created the first artist-endorsed Jamster ring-tone advertisement in the US. When "Who is Mike Jones" was released it debuted among the top 5 albums on the Billboard charts and went on to sell over a million copies. The Crazy Frog ringtone did the same in Europe.

Jamba/Jamster boomed—when VeriSign bought the business it had a turnover of $15 million per quarter and 3 quarters later this increased to $150 million a quarter—in 2005, the company made close to $600 million in revenue. VeriSign expanded Jamba/Jamster by the acquisitions of UNC-Embratel and Unimobile. Jamster also added to its revenues by adding "impulse purchasing"—when you downloaded one ringtone, you were offered others. This turned into interactive advertising, for which the mobile owner was charged, sometimes unknowingly. This created controversy in Europe, and was quickly withdrawn.

Later developments included a collaboration with L'Oréal encouraging users to send in photos to find 'America's next supermodel' and promoting VeriSign Back-Up as a mechanism to re-download music tracks a customer had previously bought to a different mobile phone, for example if the previous phone was stolen, broken or lost.

On 12 September 2006, News Corporation announced it would pay approximately $188 million for 51% shares in Jamba! and would combine it with Fox Mobile Entertainment assets, such as Mobizzo, with Lucy Hood, formerly President of Fox Mobile Entertainment, becoming CEO of the joint venture. On 23 October 2006, it was announced that Vernon Irvin would join XM Satellite Radio as Chief Marketing Officer. In late December 2010, Jesta Group acquired Fox Mobile Group from News Corp. Jesta Group renamed the mobile services company to Jesta Digital.

== Controversies ==
Jamba! had drawn criticism for allegedly misleading customers in its service advertisements. In general, Jamba! services were sold as a subscription, despite advertising that seems to imply that customers are buying a one-off phone ringtone. The company drew criticism for making it difficult to unsubscribe; for example, during December 2005, Jamba!'s German website FAQ did not mention the SMS code needed to cancel all subscriptions.

Jamba! advertised aggressively on youth-oriented channels such as MTV and German VIVA. In 2004, it spent €90 million on television advertising in Germany alone. In Jamba! countries in Europe, it was not uncommon to see a multitude of the same Jamba! commercials on television in the same commercial break. An online petition in Germany protesting against the firm's advertising practices drew some 200,000 signatures.

In late September 2006, television channels MTV, ProSieben, RTL II and Viva cited ethics concerns over refusing to air Jamba's advertisement for a Hitler themed SMS-downloadable cartoon titled "Der Bonker". Illustrator Walter Moers's short film depicts Hitler in toilet humour scenes with his dog Blondi and three German uniformed rubber ducks. The work had earned criticism from some Jewish memorial groups and politicians, while garnering praise from others.
