= Komm Kuscheln =

Studio album by Schnuffel
- Released: 16 October 2009
- Genres: Pop; Eurodance; children's; novelty
- Length: 48:32
- Language: German
- Label: Columbia
- Producer: Markus Kretschmer

Schnuffel chronology
Winterwunderland (2008)	Komm Kuscheln (2009)

Singles from Komm Kuscheln
- 1. "Piep Piep" Released: 8 October 2009

Komm Kuscheln (English: Come Cuddle) is the third (and to date final) studio album by Schnuffel. It was released in Germany on 16 October 2009 by Columbia Records.

== Composition ==
The very first track of the album is "Piep Piep" (Beep Beep), the fifth hit single released by Schnuffel on 8 October 2009, by Sony BMG Germany (Sony BMG). Inside the CD single, the B-side "Wenn es regnet" is also included as an exclusive track. Piep Piep is Schnuffel's last single released in CD format: the new song that was released in 2011, named "Dubidubi Du", was available only on the Jamba websites through download, though was later released as a digital EP on Amazon, iTunes, and Google Play in 2014. "ZEILT Productions" was the producer of the 3D animation as seen in the official music video.

== Track listing ==
No.	Title	Lyrics	Music	Translation	Length
1.	"Piep Piep"	Thomas Preuß	Preuß	"Beep Beep"	3:34
2.	"Hasentanz"	Andreas John, Erik Macholl, Alexah Carlton	John, Macholl, Carlton	"Rabbit Dance"	2:46
3.	"Nur mit dir"	Sam Francis, Susan Rafael	Francis, Rafael	"Only With You"	3:14
4.	"Ich schenk dir die ganze Welt"	Tamara Lücke, Markus Kretschmer	Lücke, Kretschmer	"I Give You the Whole World"	3:01
5.	"Dumdedideldei"	Micheal Steirer, Hanks Hobson	Steirer, Hobson		3:14
6.	"Party und Sonnenschein"	Lücke, Kretschmer	Lücke, Kretschmer	"Party and Sunshine"	3:14
7.	"Du bist mein Stern"	Preuß	Preuß	"You Are My Star"	3:08
8.	"Bumm Bumm Bumm"	Maya Singh	Singh	"Boom Boom Boom"	3:17
9.	"Ich bin glücklich"	John, Macholl, Carlton, Michael Keller	John, Macholl, Carlton, Keller	"I'm Happy"	3:04
10.	"Kuschelzoo"	John, Macholl, Carlton, Petra Bonmassar	John, Macholl, Carlton, Bonmassar	"Cuddle Zoo"	2:41
11.	"Kleine Sonne bitte schein"	Lücke, Kretschmer	Lücke, Kretschmer	"Please Shine Small Sun"	3:38
12.	"Häschenlied"	Preuß	Preuß	"Bunny Song"	3:33
13.	"Sing mir ein Lied"	Najib Hachim, Kai Yantiri	Hachim, Yantiri	"Sing Me a Song"	3:35
14.	"Mein kleiner Sonnenschein"	Jhol I. Sleety, Jack A. Sleety	Jhol Sleety, Jack Sleety	"My Little Sunshine"	3:11
15.	"C'est l'amour"	Bonmassar	Bonmassar	"It's Love"	2:46

International editions

- 2010: Adj egy puszit! (Give me a kiss!) – Hungarian version by Snufi.
- 2011: Παρέα με τοv Σνούφελ (Along with Snoufel) – Greek version by Σνούφελ το λαγουδάκι (Snoufel the Bunny). Tracks 2 and 5 are switched.

== Charts ==
Album (2009)	Peak position
Austrian Albums (Ö3 Austria)	20
German Albums (Offizielle Top 100)	78

Album (2010)	Peak position
Hungarian Albums (MAHASZ)	40

Album (2011)	Peak position
Greek International Albums Chart (IFPI)	6

"Piep Piep" (2009)	Peak position
Austrian Singles Chart	33
German Singles Chart	54
