= All Summer Long (Kid Rock song) =

2008 single by Kid Rock

Single by Kid Rock

from the album Rock n Roll Jesus
- Released: March 17, 2008
- Studio: Allen Roadhouse
- Genre: Country rock
- Length: 4:57 (album version); 3:46 (radio edit)
- Label: Atlantic; Top Dog
- Songwriters: R.J. Ritchie; Matthew Shafer; Ronnie Van Zant; Gary Rossington; Edward King; Leroy Marinell; Waddy Wachtel; Warren Zevon
- Producer: Kid Rock

Kid Rock singles chronology
"Amen" (2007)	"All Summer Long" (2008)	"Roll On" (2008)

Audio sample
- file; help

Music video
- "All Summer Long" on YouTube

"All Summer Long" is a song by American recording artist Kid Rock. It was released in March 2008 as the third single from his seventh studio album, Rock n Roll Jesus (2007). It samples "Sweet Home Alabama" by Lynyrd Skynyrd and "Werewolves of London" by Warren Zevon.

"All Summer Long" was a number-one hit in Australia and six countries across Europe, including the United Kingdom. In the United States, it crossed over to country radio, giving Kid Rock his first top-10 country hit. Kid Rock performed the song at the 2009 Grammy Awards and at WrestleMania 25, both in medleys. He also promoted the song in Europe performing at the MTV Europe Music Awards and the World Music Awards. The song led to the TV special VH-1 Storytellers in November 2008.

== Background ==
The song, musically, is a mashup of Lynyrd Skynyrd's "Sweet Home Alabama" and Warren Zevon's "Werewolves of London". This composition originated from a beat developed by Violent J of Insane Clown Posse while working with Mike E. Clark, a mutual collaborator of Kid Rock's, who sampled Warren Zevon's "Werewolves of London" and had put the tape aside for an Insane Clown Posse song, which would be released to that year's Gathering of the Juggalos. However, Clark decided to play Violent J's beat for Kid Rock, who was unimpressed by the track, even though Clark loved it. Later, Kid Rock insisted that Clark play the track again, and Kid Rock later came up with the idea to do a mashup of "Werewolves of London" and Lynyrd Skynyrd's "Sweet Home Alabama" and add a new melody, resulting in the new composition "All Summer Long".

Eight people are credited for writing "All Summer Long": the songwriters of "Werewolves of London" (Leroy Marinell, Waddy Wachtel and Warren Zevon), the songwriters of "Sweet Home Alabama" (Ed King, Gary Rossington and Ronnie Van Zant), Matthew Shafer (Uncle Kracker), and Robert Ritchie (Kid Rock).

== Chart performance ==
"All Summer Long" was Kid Rock's fourth song to chart on the Billboard Hot 100, becoming his third top-40 hit on the Hot 100 and the biggest solo hit of his career. It reached number 23 on the Hot 100 based solely on airplay, since Kid Rock had not made his catalog available for legal digital download at the time (therefore, the song received no digital sales). It also became a pop crossover hit, reaching the top 10 on the Mainstream Top 40 chart. "All Summer Long" has also reached the top 10 on Billboard's Adult Top 40.

The song was Kid Rock's third entry on the Billboard Hot Country Songs chart, after "Picture" and "Single Father" in 2003, reaching number four to become his first top-20 and top-10 single on that chart. It was a moderate hit on American rock radio, peaking at number 17 on the Mainstream Rock Tracks chart and number 38 on the Modern Rock Tracks chart. The song has sold 943,000 copies in the US as of April 2016.

In the United Kingdom, "All Summer Long" peaked atop the UK Singles Chart on the week of August 2, 2008. In the rest of Europe, the song was available as a physical and digital release; it topped the charts of Ireland, Austria, Germany, the Netherlands, and Switzerland. In Austria, it was the most successful song of 2008. It reached the top five in Flanders, Norway, and Sweden. In addition, it topped the European Hot 100 Singles chart for four weeks, ending 2008 as Europe's eighth-most-successful single. In Australia, the song was his first top-10 hit and number-one single, while in New Zealand, the song peaked at number three.

== Music video ==
The music video for the song was shot in Nashville, Tennessee, and features Kid Rock driving a Grand Craft Grand Sport boat out on the Old Hickory Lake, while two teenagers are shown enacting the song's lyrics, taking place in the implied year of 1989 as mentioned in the first verse. Kid Rock is also shown partying with girls or women on a different boat, and singing the song on a platform on the lake during night time. The platform, float & lights are a homage to the "Playboy girls" scene in the film Apocalypse Now. As the video ends, the small boat Kid Rock is driving can be seen with the word "cowboy" on the back.

== Track listing ==
1. "All Summer Long"
2. "Son of Detroit" (live)
3. "Bawitdaba" (live)

== Charts ==
=== Weekly charts ===
Chart (2008–2009)	Peak position
Australia (ARIA)	1
Austria (Ö3 Austria Top 40)	1
Belgium (Ultratop 50 Flanders)	3
Belgium (Ultratop 50 Wallonia)	31
Canada Hot 100 (Billboard)	12
Czech Republic Airplay (ČNS IFPI)	19
Denmark (Tracklisten)	7
Europe (Eurochart Hot 100 Singles)	1
France (SNEP)	24
Germany (GfK)	1
Hungary (Rádiós Top 40)	21
Ireland (IRMA)	1
Israel (Media Forest)	5
Italy (FIMI)	7
Netherlands (Dutch Top 40)	2
Netherlands (Single Top 100)	1
New Zealand (Recorded Music NZ)	3
Norway (VG-lista)	2
Scottish Singles Sales (Official Charts)	1
Slovakia Airplay (ČNS IFPI)	11
Sweden (Sverigetopplistan)	3
Switzerland (Schweizer Hitparade)	1
UK Singles (Official Charts)	1
UK Rock & Metal (Official Charts)	1
US Billboard Hot 100	23
US Adult Contemporary (Billboard)	14
US Adult Pop Airplay (Billboard)	2
US Alternative Airplay (Billboard)	38
US Hot Country Songs (Billboard)	4
US Mainstream Rock Airplay (Billboard)	17
US Pop Airplay (Billboard)	4

=== Year-end charts ===
Chart (2008)	Position
Australia (ARIA)	10
Austria (Ö3 Austria Top 40)	1
Belgium (Ultratop 50 Flanders)	29
Canada (Canadian Hot 100)	52
Europe (Eurochart Hot 100 Singles)	8
Germany (Media Control GfK)	3
Ireland (IRMA)	6
Netherlands (Dutch Top 40)	8
Netherlands (Single Top 100)	13
New Zealand (RIANZ)	13
Sweden (Sverigetopplistan)	17
Switzerland (Schweizer Hitparade)	7
UK Singles (OCC)	19
US Billboard Hot 100	85
US Adult Contemporary (Billboard)	32
US Adult Top 40 (Billboard)	15
US Country Songs (Billboard)	42
US Mainstream Top 40 (Billboard)	36

Chart (2009)	Position
Hungary (Rádiós Top 40)	139
Switzerland (Schweizer Hitparade)	85

=== Decade-end charts ===
Chart (2000–2009)	Position
Australia (ARIA)	26
Germany (Media Control GfK)	23

== Certifications ==
Region	Certification	Certified units/sales
Australia (ARIA)	Platinum	70,000^{^}
Austria (IFPI Austria)	Platinum	30,000^{*}
Denmark (IFPI Danmark)	Gold	7,500^{^}
Germany (BVMI)	3× Gold	450,000^{^}
Italy (FIMI)	Gold	25,000^{‡}
New Zealand (RMNZ)	Platinum	15,000^{*}
Sweden (GLF)	Gold	10,000^{^}
United Kingdom (BPI)	Platinum	585,000
United States (RIAA)	Gold	943,000
^{*} Sales figures based on certification alone.^{^} Shipments figures based on certification alone.^{‡} Sales+streaming figures based on certification alone.

== Release history ==
Region	Date	Format(s)	Label(s)	Ref.
United States	March 17, 2008	Modern rock radio	Atlantic; Top Dog	
United States	May 27, 2008	Contemporary hit radio	Atlantic; Top Dog	
United Kingdom	June 30, 2008	Digital download	Atlantic; Top Dog	
United Kingdom	July 2008	CD	Atlantic; Top Dog	

== Hit Masters version ==
"All Summer Long"

Single by Hit Masters
- Released: August 12, 2008
- Length: 3:48
- Label: Hip Kiddy
- Songwriters: R.J. Ritchie; Matthew Shafer; Ronnie Van Zant; Gary Rossington; Edward King; Leroy Marinell; Waddy Wachtel; Warren Zevon
- Producer: Hit Masters

Hit Masters singles chronology
"All Summer Long" (2008)	"Call Me Maybe" (2012)

A recording of the song was released digitally by Hit Masters, a karaoke company whose version was made available in the iTunes Store in North America. Due to Kid Rock's decision to withhold his music from the iTunes market, sales from the karaoke version eventually caused it to overtake Kid Rock's original on the Billboard Hot 100 in the United States peaking at number 19. This version also peaked at number 28 on the Canadian Hot 100 due to digital downloads. As Rock's version remained in the top 30 based on radio airplay alone, Hit Masters jumped into the top 20 due to its sales strength. However, the radio success of "All Summer Long" propelled Rock N Roll Jesus back up to number two on the Billboard 200, nearly a year after its release.

=== Charts ===
Chart (2008)	Peak position
Canada (Canadian Hot 100)	28
US Billboard Hot 100	19

== The Rock Heroes version ==
"All Summer Long"

Single by The Rock Heroes

from the album A Salute to Kid Rock
- Released: September 2008
- Length: 4:56
- Label: Big Eye
- Songwriters: R.J. Ritchie; Matthew Shafer; Ronnie Van Zant; Gary Rossington; Edward King; Leroy Marinell; Waddy Wachtel; Warren Zevon

Another recording of the song by karaoke band the Rock Heroes was released on iTunes for digital downloads in North America in September 2008. In the U.S. it debuted at number 38 on the Billboard Hot 100 and then rose to number 29 the next week, and also in Canada it debuted at number 16 on the Canadian Hot 100 due to digital downloads.

=== Charts ===
Chart (2008)	Peak position
Canada (Canadian Hot 100)	16
US Billboard Hot 100	29

== See also ==
- List of number-one singles in Australia in 2008
- List of number-one hits of 2008 (Austria)
- List of European number-one hits of 2008
- List of number-one hits of 2008 (Germany)
- List of number-one singles of 2008 (Ireland)
- List of number-one hits of 2008 (Switzerland)
- List of number-one singles from the 2000s (UK)
- List of UK Rock Chart number-one singles of 2008
