= Winterwunderland =

Studio album by Schnuffel
- Released: 21 November 2008
- Genres: Christmas; pop; children's; novelty
- Length: 45:18
- Language: German
- Label: Columbia
- Producer: Markus Kretschmer

Schnuffel chronology
Ich hab' Dich lieb (2008)	Winterwunderland (2008)	Komm Kuscheln (2009)

Singles from Winterwunderland
- 1. "Schnuffels Weihnachtslied" Released: 12 December 2008

Winterwunderland (English: Winterwonderland) is the second studio album by German animated character Schnuffel. It was released on 21 November 2008, by Columbia Records, then re-released on 23 January 2009 (with the only differences between the two versions being a change of text font on the album cover). A Krone-Edition of the album was later released on 16 November 2012.

== Composition ==
"Schnuffels Weihnachtslied" (Schnuffel's Christmas song) is the fourth hit single released by Schnuffel, on 12 December 2008, and it's the 9th track of the album. Inside the CD single, the B-side "Zuckersternchen" is also included as an exclusive track. "ZEILT Productions" was the producer of the 3D animation as seen in the official music video.

== Track listing ==
No.	Title	Lyrics	Music	Translation	Length
1.	"In meinem Herzen"	Sam Francis, Andrea Husak	Francis, Husak	"In My Heart"	2:59
2.	"Du und ich"	Francis, Axel Kurth	Francis, Kurth	"You and I"	3:30
3.	"Schneeflocke"	Francis, Susan Rafael	Francis, Rafael	"Snowflake"	3:34
4.	"Superhäschen"	Francis, Kurth	Francis, Kurth	"Super Rabbit"	3:44
5.	"Mein Hasenfreund"	Francis, Kurth	Francis, Kurth	"My Rabbit Friend"	3:21
6.	"Schnuffels Adventskalender"	Francis, Rafael	Francis, Rafael	"Schnuffel's Advent Calendar"	2:45
7.	"Ich back' für dich heut einen Kuchen"	Tamara Lücke, Markus Kretschmer	Lücke, Kretschmer	"I Baked a Cake for You Today"	2:59
8.	"Mein schönstes Geschenk"	Francis, Kurth	Francis, Kurth	"My Best Gift"	3:37
9.	"Schnuffels Weihnachtslied"	Francis, Rafael	Francis, Rafael	"Schnuffel's Christmas Song"	2:45
10.	"Häschen auf die Piste"	Francis, Rafael	Francis, Rafael	"Rabbits on the Piste"	3:26
11.	"Du bist wie heiße Schokolade"	Lücke, Kretschmer	Lücke, Kretschmer	"You're Like Hot Chocolate"	2:57
12.	"Mir ist kalt"	Klaus Hanslbauer	Hanslbauer	"I Feel Cold"	3:32
13.	"Morgenmuffel Schnuffel"	Francis, Rafael	Francis, Rafael	"Sleepy Schnuffel"	2:35
14.	"Kuschel Song" (Akustik Version)	Sebastian Nussbaum, Andreas Wendorf	Lücke, Kretschmer	"Cuddle Song"	3:04

International editions

- 2009: Winterwonderland – English version by Snuggle (released only in Australia, Norway and the United Kingdom) with English titles such as "You Make My Heart Sing", "Super Bunny", "Bunny Buddy", "Advent Song", "Today I'm Baking You a Pie", "Bunnies on the Ski Run", "(You Are So Sweet Just Like) Hot Chocolate" and "Sleepy Snuggle".
- 2010: Παιχνίδια στο χιόνι (Games in the snow) – Greek version by Σνούφελ το λαγουδάκι (Snoufel the Bunny). Released by Heaven Music, it excludes the tracks "Mein schönstes Geschenk" and "Kuschel Song" (Akustik Version), while adding "Zuckersternchen" as the final bonus track. Also, the song "Schnuffels Weihnachtslied" is the first track.

== Charts ==
Album (2008)	Peak position
Austrian Albums (Ö3 Austria)	18
German Albums (Offizielle Top 100)	44

Album (2011)	Peak position
Greek Albums (IFPI)	4

"Schnuffels Weihnachtslied" (2008)	Peak position
Austrian Singles Chart	33
German Singles Chart	23
