= So What (Pink song) =

2008 single by Pink

Single by Pink

from the album Funhouse
- B-side: "Could've Had Everything"
- Released: August 11, 2008
- Recorded: 2008
- Studio: Maratone (Stockholm, Sweden); House of Blues (Los Angeles)
- Genre: Electronic rock; dance-rock; glam rock; pop rock
- Length: 3:35
- Label: LaFace
- Songwriters: Pink; Max Martin; Shellback
- Producer: Max Martin

Pink singles chronology
"'Cuz I Can" (2007)	"So What" (2008)	"Sober" (2008)

Music video
- "So What" on YouTube

"So What" is a song recorded by American singer Pink for her fifth studio album, Funhouse (2008). The song was written by Pink, Max Martin, and Shellback, and produced by Martin. Selected as the album's lead single, "So What" was first released on August 11, 2008, and to mainstream radios on August 25, 2008, through LaFace and Zomba Label Group. The song consists of a martial beat and synth backing. The lyrics are based on her separation from freestyle motocross rider Carey Hart, which occurred six months prior to the release.

"So What" received positive reviews from contemporary music critics; many praised it for its aggressive and empowering nature while others deemed it childish and bratty. The song was also successful commercially, topping the charts in several countries across Europe and Oceania and peaking within the top five worldwide. In the United States, the song reached number one on the Billboard Hot 100, becoming her second single and her first solo number-one single to top the chart. "So What" also became her highest-selling single in the United States, with sales of over four million downloads. The song was the second-bestselling song of 2008 in Australia and the sixth-bestselling song of the entire 2000s decade in the country. It was certified diamond in the country.

The music video for "So What" was directed by longtime collaborator Dave Meyers. It shows Pink drinking while riding a lawnmower, sawing down a tree, smashing a guitar at a Guitar Center and other activities. The video also features a cameo appearance from Hart. Pink performed "So What" on MTV Europe Music Awards 2008 on November 6, 2008. The song was nominated for several awards, eventually winning the MTV Europe Music Award for the Most Addictive Track.

== Background and production ==
"So What" was written by Pink, Shellback, and Max Martin. Martin also handled the production and recording, which took place at Maratone Studios in Stockholm, Sweden. Al Clay also recorded the song at the House of Blues Studio – a recording studio in Los Angeles, California. The song was mixed at MixStar Studios in Virginia Beach, Virginia, by Serban Ghenea. John Hanes edited the song using Pro Tools technology with assistance provided by the person called Tim Roberts. The song was finally mastered by Tom Coyne at Sterling Sound in New York City, New York. The song's lyrical content was based on her separation from her husband, motocross rider Carey Hart. After reuniting with Hart on January 1, 2009, Pink told Ellen DeGeneres in an interview on DeGeneres' syndicated talk show that she found it "funny" to perform the song when he was in the audience and especially enjoyed the bit where she sang the line "You're a tool".

== Composition ==
"So What"
A 21-second sample of "So What" featuring Pink singing about her post-breakup adventures to a martial beat and synth backing.

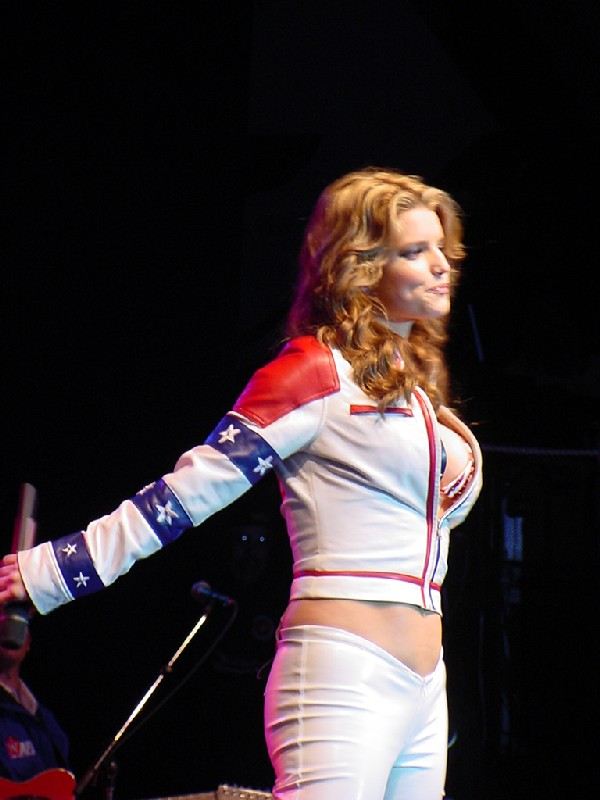
American pop singer Jessica Simpson is mentioned in the song.

"So What" runs for 3 minutes and 35 seconds, with an energetic, confident vibe. The song consists of a powerful, charging beat, a singalong chorus, and a synthesizer backing influenced by club music. Set to a meter of 4/4 (or common time), the tempo of “So What” is 126 BPM (beats per minute), although it may also be interpreted at half-time (at 63 BPM) or double-time (at 252 BPM). Additionally, with its many triplets, the melody may also be interpreted as 6/8 or 12/8 time. The song's verses and pre-chorus bars are in the key of F-sharp minor, with its choruses and bridge in the relative key of A major. The initial guitar riff is closely familiar to Deep Purple's "Black Night". Lyrically, the song chronicles the protagonist's adventures following her separation from her husband. Evan Sawdey of PopMatters noted that the song has a hint of desperation in the lines "I don’t want you tonight, I’m alright, I'm just fine", implying that she is spending time convincing herself that she's enjoying the single life. The song is described as an electronic rock, glam rock, and pop rock song.

== Release ==
"So What" was released as the first single from Pink's fifth studio album Funhouse (2008). It was first released on August 11, 2008, via digital download to certain countries including Australia, Canada, New Zealand, and the United Kingdom. LaFace and Jive Records solicited the song to contemporary hit radio on August 25, 2008. On September 20, 2008, "So What" was released as a two-track single to digital retailers in certain countries. The single included a B-side, "Could've Had Everything". An extended play was released across Europe on September 26, 2008, containing "Could've Had Everything" and the original and instrumental version of "So What". On October 24 and November 14, 2008, remixes by UK dance music group Bimbo Jones was released to digital retailers across Europe in the form of a radio mix and the regular mix. In the United States, "So What" was released as a CD single, featuring the clean and unedited versions of the song.

== Critical reception ==
Reed Fischer of Village Voice noted it was the "newest entry in the Fantastic Empowerment Anthems genre." Stephen Thomas Erlewine, senior editor of AllMusic, named it one of Funhouse's best tracks, calling it, in conjunction with "Bad Influence", "instantly indelible". Andy Battaglia of The A.V. Club expressed a different opinion towards the song, calling it "so blaring and bad as to make Funhouse seem like a lost cause from the start." Chris Willman of Entertainment Weekly praised "So What" as a great anthem of "bluffing and bravado", while Jon Caramanica of The New York Times referred to the song as "perfunctory". Evan Sawdey of PopMatters wrote positively about the song, calling it "as big a red herring single as you can find." Jonathan Keefe of Slant Magazine called "So What" a middling effort among the songs he considers viable single material in Funhouse. Keefe later referred to it as nothing more than a "schoolyard taunt", linking it to Pink's 2001 single "Get the Party Started" (Missundaztood, 2001).

Bill Lamb of About.com awarded "So What" a four-and-a-half–star rating, praising the song's synth backing and beat and Pink's attitude. Lamb also praised Max Martin for his production work on the song, writing that he "punches up the energy level to 10." Nick Levine of Digital Spy, in his review of the leaked single, called the song "brash, childish, slightly ridiculous, packed with attitude and sounds like something only Pink could get away with." Levine also called it "terrifically catchy" and praised the chorus as one "that practically begs you to chant along." Following its official release in the United Kingdom, Levine awarded it a five-star rating, calling it one that people will sing along to. Lucy Davies of BBC called the song an "aggressively swinging opener" that "slams Pink's cards down on the table setting the defiant, self-deprecating tone of the album." Michael Cragg of musicOMH wrote that Pink was at her best when she uses her life experiences to create "smart, energetic pop songs", citing "So What" as one of them.

=== Accolades ===
This song was number 29 on Rolling Stone's list of the 100 Best Songs of 2008. Time critic Josh Tyrangiel named this the #2 song of 2008.

Year	Ceremony	Award	Result
2008	MTV Europe Music Awards	Most Addictive Track	Won
2009	51st Grammy Awards	Best Female Pop Vocal Performance	Nominated
2009	MTV Video Music Awards	Best Female Video	Nominated

== Chart performance ==
"So What" became Pink's most successful single from Funhouse (2008). In the United States, the song entered at number nine on the Billboard Hot 100 in the issue dated September 6, 2008, earning the highest debut title for that week. Two weeks later, the song topped the US Hot Digital Songs chart, selling 197,000 digital downloads. One week later, in the issue September 27, 2008, it topped the Billboard Hot 100, selling 253,000 downloads that week. The song became her second number-one hit on the chart after her 2001 collaboration single "Lady Marmalade" with Christina Aguilera, Lil' Kim, and Mýa. The song also topped the US Adult Pop Songs in the issue dated December 20, 2008, and on the US Pop Songs chart for four weeks. It also peaked at number 21 on the US Hot Dance Club Songs. "So What" has sold 4,624,000 digital downloads in the United States as of August 2013.

"So What" proved to be a major success across Europe, peaking within the top five in various countries. In the United Kingdom, the song entered the singles chart at number 38 for the issue dated October 4, 2008. It ascended to number one the following week, becoming Pink's third UK number one, staying there for three consecutive weeks before being knocked-off the top spot by Girls Aloud‘s “The Promise”. The song lasted a total of 36 weeks on the chart, selling 500,000 copies in the United Kingdom, according to The Official Charts Company. "So What" debuted at number nine on the Swedish Singles Chart on September 4, 2008. A week later, on September 11, 2008, it rose to its peak position of number two, where it remained for two weeks. The song was certified gold by the Swedish Recording Industry Association (GLF) on December 11, 2008, for shipments of 20,000 units. Upon its debut in Switzerland, the song topped the singles chart and remained there for three more weeks. The song ran on the chart for a course of 41 weeks, during which time it sold 30,000 units, earning a platinum certification by International Federation of the Phonographic Industry – Switzerland. In France, "So What" met a very huge success and is considered Pink's signature song there, in debuting at number 9 in October 2008. It was P!nk's highest-debut single in there. The last week of December 2008 "So What" peaked at number 4, and becoming her second top five after her 2001 smash hit "Get The Party Started". The single spent 33 weeks on the charts and remains being the longuest-running track for the singer until "Just Give Me A Reason" in 2013.

Equally in Austria, the track met an overwhelming commercial acclaim and reached the summit, becoming her second number one after "Dear Mr. President".

"So What" also topped the singles charts in both Australia and New Zealand. In Australia, it remained atop the chart for four consecutive weeks and on the chart for nearly eight months. The song shipped 280,000 units in Australia, earning a quadruple-platinum certification by the Australian Recording Industry Association (ARIA). In New Zealand, the single debuted on the singles chart at number 25 on August 18, 2008. Three weeks later, it topped the chart, where it stayed for five consecutive weeks. It lasted a total of 24 weeks on the chart, selling 15,000 copies and earning a platinum certification from the Recording Industry Association of New Zealand (RIANZ) on January 11, 2009.

== Music video ==
Dave Meyers, known for having artists give over-the-top portrayals of celebrities (or themselves), directed the video for "So What". Pink had previously worked with Meyers on several occasions, notably on the music videos to "U + Ur Hand" and "Stupid Girls", both earning an MTV Video Music Award for Best Pop Video. Additionally, Pink worked with Meyers on other music videos for "There You Go", "Most Girls", "You Make Me Sick", "Get the Party Started", "Don't Let Me Get Me" and the Charlie's Angels: Full Throttle track "Feel Good Time". The video was shown on August 22 on FNMTV. The video premiered on 22 August 2008 on the UK music site Popjustice. Pink posted a message on her website for her fans about what it was like to shoot the video:

If you EVER get a chance to drive a lawnmower down Sunset Blvd – I highly suggest it. Thanks for making my day. I'm really, really, really excited. This video was too much fun... glad you likey's and don't worry – Carey likey's too. We are insane.

— Pink, Pink's official website

A split screenshot showing a love heart carved on a tree with Pink's legal name and the name of her then-estranged husband. The second shows Pink cutting down the tree. The carving was saved and is now a feature in the couple's house.

The video begins in a tattoo parlor, where Pink is getting a tattoo of a red void mark on her arm across an existing tattoo, before the scene cuts to Pink riding down Sunset Boulevard in Los Angeles on a lawnmower while drinking alcohol. Pink is then shown entering a Guitar Center store and browsing guitars. She pretends to play before attempting to smash it into the ground, but she is restrained by a store clerk, leading to a scuffle. Pink is shown cutting down a tree engraved with her legal name (Alecia Moore) and her estranged husband's name (Carey Hart) with a chainsaw. She cries on the chainsaw while telling herself that she is all right, right before the tree falls and nearly crushes her neighbor. After this, Pink is sitting in a bar after losing her table to Jessica Simpson, accompanied by a man who is playing the drums out of glasses.

The next scene sees Pink on a motorbike, and a newlywed couple in a car pulls-up beside her, waving and smiling. Jealous and outraged at the happy newlyweds, Pink is shown throwing objects at the car and popping the blown-up condoms used to decorate the vehicle, before climbing onto it and playfully (albeit violently) “attacking” the vehicle. Pink is then shown stripping on a red carpet, surrounded by photographers, as she takes off her jacket to reveal her (censored) nude body. The paparazzi all snap photos of her as she does choreography from Michael Jackson's video for "Thriller", naked, but more akin to Mike Myers in Austin Powers 2. Then, while getting her hair done, Pink's stylist applies hairspray as she proceeds to light a cigarette, accidentally setting her hair on fire. Also shown are two men urinating in beer bottles, which they give to Pink; however, she passes them to two men walking past her. They drink it and then, realizing what it is, spit it out in disgust. Finally, Pink is shown surrounded by men and women in their underwear engaging in a pillow fight.

The video then cuts between all the scenes shown in the video before ending with Pink poking her tongue at the camera with her husband. Pink is also shown performing the song, live, near the end. Her husband, Carey Hart, makes cameos throughout the video, such as a scene where they are talking as newspaper headlines appear behind them. Producer Butch Walker also makes a cameo. Pink has stated that Hart had not heard the song prior to arriving for the video shoot. The video was released on September 6 on iTunes. The video was ranked on VH1 as the 3rd best music video of 2008 on the Top 40 Videos of 2008. On Facebook, it was the second favorite video of 2008. The scene from the video where Pink's hair is set on fire was censored on MTV UK and its sister channels due to regulations surrounding immolation and violence. That scene is replaced with other short clips from the video.

== Credits and personnel ==
Recording, mixing and mastering

- Recorded at Maratone Studios in Stockholm, Sweden and House of Blues Studio in Los Angeles, California
- Mixed at MixStar Studios in Virginia Beach, Virginia
- Mastered at Sterling Sound in New York City, New York

Personnel

- Vocals – Pink
- Songwriting – Pink, Max Martin, Shellback
- Production – Max Martin
- Recording – Max Martin, Al Clay
- Mixing – Serban Ghenea
- Pro Tools editing – John Hanes, assisted by Tim Roberts
- Mastering – Tom Coyne

Credits adapted from Funhouse liner notes, LaFace Records, Jive Records.

== Track listing ==
Digital single

1. "So What" – 3:34

Two-track single

1. "So What" – 3:34
2. "Could've Had Everything" – 3:09
3. "So What" (Video) – 3:46

EP

1. "So What" – 3:34
2. "So What (Clean)" – 3:35
3. "Could've Had Everything" – 3:09

Bimbo Jones Radio Mix

1. "So What (Bimbo Jones Radio Mix)" – 3:36

CD single

Digital single

1. "So What" – 3:34

Two-track single

1. "So What" – 3:34
2. "Could've Had Everything" – 3:09
3. "So What" (Video) – 3:46

EP

1. "So What" – 3:34
2. "So What (Clean)" – 3:35
3. "Could've Had Everything" – 3:09

Bimbo Jones Radio Mix

1. "So What (Bimbo Jones Radio Mix)" – 3:36

CD single

1. "So What (Clean)" – 3:35
2. "So What" – 3:35

Bimbo Jones Mix

1. "So What (Bimbo Jones Mix)" – 7:29

CD single (UK and Ireland only)

1. "So What" – 3:35
2. "Could've Had Everything" – 3:09

== Charts ==
=== Weekly charts ===
2008–2009 weekly chart performance for "So What"
Chart (2008–2009)	Peak position
Australia (ARIA)	1
Austria (Ö3 Austria Top 40)	1
Belgium (Ultratop 50 Flanders)	4
Belgium (Ultratop 50 Wallonia)	7
Bulgaria Airplay (BAMP)	6
Canada Hot 100 (Billboard)	1
Canada CHR/Top 40 (Billboard)	1
Canada Hot AC (Billboard)	1
CIS Airplay (TopHit)	41
Croatia International Airplay (Top lista)	1
Czech Republic Airplay (ČNS IFPI)	1
Denmark (Tracklisten)	3
Europe (European Hot 100 Singles)	1
Finland (Suomen virallinen lista)	2
France (SNEP)	4
Germany (GfK)	1
Hungary (Rádiós Top 40)	7
Iceland (RÚV)	15
Ireland (IRMA)	1
Israel International Airplay (Media Forest)	1
Italy (FIMI)	14
Japan Hot 100 (Billboard)	17
Mexico Anglo (Monitor Latino)	1
Mexico (Billboard Ingles Airplay)	4
Netherlands (Dutch Top 40)	4
Netherlands (Single Top 100)	10
New Zealand (Recorded Music NZ)	1
Norway (VG-lista)	3
Portugal Digital (Billboard)	1
Russia Airplay (TopHit)	41
Scottish Singles Sales (Official Charts)	1
Slovakia (Rádio Top 100)	2
Spain (Promusicae)	31
Sweden (Sverigetopplistan)	2
Switzerland (Schweizer Hitparade)	1
Ukraine Airplay (TopHit)	56
UK Singles (Official Charts)	1
US Billboard Hot 100	1
US Adult Pop Airplay (Billboard)	1
US Dance Club Songs (Billboard)	21
US Pop Airplay (Billboard)	1
US Rhythmic Airplay (Billboard)	28

2021 weekly chart performance for "So What"
Chart (2021)	Peak position
Honduras Anglo (Monitor Latino)	9

=== Monthly charts ===
2025 monthly chart performance for "So What"
Chart (2025)	Peak position
Russia Streaming (TopHit)	100

=== Year-end charts ===
Chart (2008)	Position
Australia (ARIA)	2
Austria (Ö3 Austria Top 40)	16
Belgium (Ultratop 50 Flanders)	28
Belgium (Ultratop 50 Wallonia)	67
Canada (Canadian Hot 100)	19
Croatia International Airplay (HRT)	25
Europe (European Hot 100 Singles)	16
France (SNEP)	68
Germany (Media Control GfK)	16
Netherlands (Dutch Top 40)	18
Netherlands (Single Top 100)	55
New Zealand (RIANZ)	19
Sweden (Sverigetopplistan)	20
Switzerland (Schweizer Hitparade)	11
UK Singles (OCC)	14
US Billboard Hot 100	24
US Adult Top 40 (Billboard)	35
US Mainstream Top 40 (Billboard)	28

Chart (2009)	Position
Australia (ARIA)	57
Austria (Ö3 Austria Top 40)	43
Belgium (Ultratop 50 Wallonia)	82
Canada (Canadian Hot 100)	59
Europe (European Hot 100 Singles)	17
France (SNEP)	61
Germany (Media Control GfK)	77
Hungary (Rádiós Top 40)	41
Sweden (Sverigetopplistan)	77
Switzerland (Schweizer Hitparade)	30
UK Singles (OCC)	124
US Billboard Hot 100	45
US Adult Top 40 (Billboard)	24

=== Decade-end charts ===
Chart (2000–2009)	Position
Australia (ARIA)	6
Austria (Ö3 Austria Top 40)	98
Germany (Official German Charts)	37
US Billboard Hot 100	92

== Certifications ==
Region	Certification	Certified units/sales
Australia (ARIA)	10× Platinum	700,000^{‡}
Austria (IFPI Austria)	Gold	15,000^{*}
Belgium (BRMA)	Gold	
Canada (Music Canada)	5× Platinum	400,000^{‡}
Denmark (IFPI Danmark)	Platinum	15,000^{^}
Finland (Musiikkituottajat)	Gold	7,407
Germany (BVMI)	Platinum	300,000^{^}
Italy (FIMI)	Gold	25,000^{‡}
Mexico (AMPROFON)	2× Platinum+Gold	150,000^{‡}
New Zealand (RMNZ)	3× Platinum	90,000^{‡}
Spain (Promusicae)	Gold	30,000^{‡}
Sweden (GLF)	Gold	10,000^{^}
Switzerland (IFPI Switzerland)	Platinum	30,000^{^}
United Kingdom (BPI)	3× Platinum	1,800,000^{‡}
United States	—	4,624,000
Ringtone
United States	—	600,000
^{*} Sales figures based on certification alone.^{^} Shipments figures based on certification alone.^{‡} Sales+streaming figures based on certification alone.

== Radio and release history ==
Country	Date	Format	Label
Australia	August 11, 2008	Digital download	RCA Records, Jive Records
Austria	August 11, 2008	Digital download	RCA Records, Jive Records
Brazil	August 11, 2008	Digital download	RCA Records, Jive Records
Canada	August 11, 2008	Digital download	RCA Records, Jive Records
Hungary	August 11, 2008	Digital download	RCA Records, Jive Records
Japan	August 11, 2008	Digital download	RCA Records, Jive Records
Mexico	August 11, 2008	Digital download	RCA Records, Jive Records
New Zealand	August 11, 2008	Digital download	RCA Records, Jive Records
United Kingdom	August 11, 2008	Digital download	RCA Records, Jive Records
United States	August 25, 2008	Contemporary hit radio	LaFace Records, Jive Records
Australia	September 20, 2008	Digital download	LaFace Records
Brazil	September 20, 2008	Digital download	LaFace Records
Mexico	September 20, 2008	Digital download	LaFace Records
Sweden	September 20, 2008	Digital download	LaFace Records
United Kingdom	September 20, 2008	Digital download	LaFace Records
Austria	September 26, 2008	EP	LaFace Records
Belgium	September 26, 2008	EP	LaFace Records
Brazil	September 26, 2008	EP	LaFace Records
Denmark	September 26, 2008	EP	LaFace Records
Finland	September 26, 2008	EP	LaFace Records
France	September 26, 2008	EP	LaFace Records
Germany	September 26, 2008	EP	LaFace Records
Hungary	September 26, 2008	EP	LaFace Records
Ireland	September 26, 2008	EP	LaFace Records
Italy	September 26, 2008	EP	LaFace Records
Mexico	September 26, 2008	EP	LaFace Records
Netherlands	September 26, 2008	EP	LaFace Records
New Zealand	September 26, 2008	EP	LaFace Records
Norway	September 26, 2008	EP	LaFace Records
Slovakia	September 26, 2008	EP	LaFace Records
Spain	September 26, 2008	EP	LaFace Records
Sweden	September 26, 2008	EP	LaFace Records
United Kingdom	September 26, 2008	EP	LaFace Records
Austria	October 24, 2008	Digital download (Bimbo Jones Radio Mix)	LaFace Records
Belgium	October 24, 2008	Digital download (Bimbo Jones Radio Mix)	LaFace Records
Brazil	October 24, 2008	Digital download (Bimbo Jones Radio Mix)	LaFace Records
Canada	October 24, 2008	Digital download (Bimbo Jones Radio Mix)	LaFace Records
Denmark	October 24, 2008	Digital download (Bimbo Jones Radio Mix)	LaFace Records
Finland	October 24, 2008	Digital download (Bimbo Jones Radio Mix)	LaFace Records
France	October 24, 2008	Digital download (Bimbo Jones Radio Mix)	LaFace Records
Hungary	October 24, 2008	Digital download (Bimbo Jones Radio Mix)	LaFace Records
Ireland	October 24, 2008	Digital download (Bimbo Jones Radio Mix)	LaFace Records
Italy	October 24, 2008	Digital download (Bimbo Jones Radio Mix)	LaFace Records
Japan	October 24, 2008	Digital download (Bimbo Jones Radio Mix)	LaFace Records
Mexico	October 24, 2008	Digital download (Bimbo Jones Radio Mix)	LaFace Records
Netherlands	October 24, 2008	Digital download (Bimbo Jones Radio Mix)	LaFace Records
Norway	October 24, 2008	Digital download (Bimbo Jones Radio Mix)	LaFace Records
Slovakia	October 24, 2008	Digital download (Bimbo Jones Radio Mix)	LaFace Records
Spain	October 24, 2008	Digital download (Bimbo Jones Radio Mix)	LaFace Records
Sweden	October 24, 2008	Digital download (Bimbo Jones Radio Mix)	LaFace Records
Switzerland	October 24, 2008	Digital download (Bimbo Jones Radio Mix)	LaFace Records
United Kingdom	October 24, 2008	Digital download (Bimbo Jones Radio Mix)	LaFace Records
United States	October 28, 2008	CD single	Virgin Records
Austria	November 14, 2008	Digital download (Bimbo Jones Mix)	LaFace Records
Belgium	November 14, 2008	Digital download (Bimbo Jones Mix)	LaFace Records
Brazil	November 14, 2008	Digital download (Bimbo Jones Mix)	LaFace Records
Canada	November 14, 2008	Digital download (Bimbo Jones Mix)	LaFace Records
Denmark	November 14, 2008	Digital download (Bimbo Jones Mix)	LaFace Records
Finland	November 14, 2008	Digital download (Bimbo Jones Mix)	LaFace Records
France	November 14, 2008	Digital download (Bimbo Jones Mix)	LaFace Records
Hungary	November 14, 2008	Digital download (Bimbo Jones Mix)	LaFace Records
Ireland	November 14, 2008	Digital download (Bimbo Jones Mix)	LaFace Records
Italy	November 14, 2008	Digital download (Bimbo Jones Mix)	LaFace Records
Mexico	November 14, 2008	Digital download (Bimbo Jones Mix)	LaFace Records
Netherlands	November 14, 2008	Digital download (Bimbo Jones Mix)	LaFace Records
Norway	November 14, 2008	Digital download (Bimbo Jones Mix)	LaFace Records
Slovakia	November 14, 2008	Digital download (Bimbo Jones Mix)	LaFace Records
Spain	November 14, 2008	Digital download (Bimbo Jones Mix)	LaFace Records
Sweden	November 14, 2008	Digital download (Bimbo Jones Mix)	LaFace Records
Switzerland	November 14, 2008	Digital download (Bimbo Jones Mix)	LaFace Records
United Kingdom	November 14, 2008	Digital download (Bimbo Jones Mix)	LaFace Records

== See also ==
- List of number-one singles in Australia in 2008
- List of number-one hits of 2008 (Austria)
- List of Hot 100 number-one singles of 2008 (Canada)
- List of European number-one hits of 2008
- List of number-one hits of 2008 (Germany)
- List of number-one singles of 2008 (Ireland)
- List of number-one hits of 2008 (Switzerland)
- List of number-one singles from the 2000s (New Zealand)
- List of number-one singles from the 2000s (UK)
- List of Hot 100 number-one singles of 2008 (U.S.)
- List of number-one dance airplay hits of 2008 (U.S.)
