= List of European number-one hits of 2008 =

This is a list of the European Hot 100 Singles and European Top 100 Albums number ones of 2008, as published by Billboard magazine.

== Chart history ==
Key
†	Indicates best-performing single and album of 2008

Issue date	Song	Artist	Album	Artist	Ref.
2 January	"Apologize" †	Timbaland presents OneRepublic	Back to Black †	Amy Winehouse	
9 January	"Apologize" †	Timbaland presents OneRepublic	Back to Black †	Amy Winehouse	
16 January	"Apologize" †	Timbaland presents OneRepublic	Back to Black †	Amy Winehouse	
23 January	"Apologize" †	Timbaland presents OneRepublic	Back to Black †	Amy Winehouse	
30 January	"Apologize" †	Timbaland presents OneRepublic	Back to Black †	Amy Winehouse	
6 February	"Apologize" †	Timbaland presents OneRepublic	Back to Black †	Amy Winehouse	
13 February	"Apologize" †	Timbaland presents OneRepublic	Sleep Through the Static	Jack Johnson	
20 February	"Apologize" †	Timbaland presents OneRepublic	Thriller 25	Michael Jackson	
27 February	"Bleeding Love"	Leona Lewis	Back to Black †	Amy Winehouse	
5 March	"Apologize" †	Timbaland featuring OneRepublic	Back to Black †	Amy Winehouse	
12 March	"Bleeding Love"	Leona Lewis	Back to Black †	Amy Winehouse	
19 March	"Mercy"	Duffy	Back to Black †	Amy Winehouse	
26 March	"Bleeding Love"	Leona Lewis	Back to Black †	Amy Winehouse	
2 April	"Bleeding Love"	Leona Lewis	Back to Black †	Amy Winehouse	
9 April	"Bleeding Love"	Leona Lewis	Accelerate	R.E.M.	
16 April	"Mercy"	Duffy	Rockferry	Duffy	
23 April	"4 Minutes"	Madonna featuring Justin Timberlake	Rockferry	Duffy	
30 April	"4 Minutes"	Madonna featuring Justin Timberlake	Rockferry	Duffy	
7 May	"4 Minutes"	Madonna featuring Justin Timberlake	Hard Candy	Madonna	
14 May	"4 Minutes"	Madonna featuring Justin Timberlake	Hard Candy	Madonna	
21 May	"4 Minutes"	Madonna featuring Justin Timberlake	Hard Candy	Madonna	
28 May	"4 Minutes"	Madonna featuring Justin Timberlake	Hard Candy	Madonna	
4 June	"4 Minutes"	Madonna featuring Justin Timberlake	Rockferry	Duffy	
11 June	"Mercy"	Duffy	Rockferry	Duffy	
18 June	"Mercy"	Duffy	Rockferry	Duffy	
25 June	"Mercy"	Duffy	Viva la Vida or Death and All His Friends	Coldplay	
2 July	"Mercy"	Duffy	Viva la Vida or Death and All His Friends	Coldplay	
9 July	"American Boy"	Estelle featuring Kanye West	Viva la Vida or Death and All His Friends	Coldplay	
16 July	"All Summer Long"	Kid Rock	Viva la Vida or Death and All His Friends	Coldplay	
23 July	"All Summer Long"	Kid Rock	Viva la Vida or Death and All His Friends	Coldplay	
30 July	"All Summer Long"	Kid Rock	Viva la Vida or Death and All His Friends	Coldplay	
6 August	"All Summer Long"	Kid Rock	Viva la Vida or Death and All His Friends	Coldplay	
13 August	"I Kissed a Girl"	Katy Perry	Viva la Vida or Death and All His Friends	Coldplay	
20 August	"I Kissed a Girl"	Katy Perry	Viva la Vida or Death and All His Friends	Coldplay	
27 August	"I Kissed a Girl"	Katy Perry	Viva la Vida or Death and All His Friends	Coldplay	
3 September	"I Kissed a Girl"	Katy Perry	All Hope Is Gone	Slipknot	
10 September	"I Kissed a Girl"	Katy Perry	Viva la Vida or Death and All His Friends	Coldplay	
17 September	"I Kissed a Girl"	Katy Perry	Death Magnetic	Metallica	
24 September	"I Kissed a Girl"	Katy Perry	Death Magnetic	Metallica	
1 October	"I Kissed a Girl"	Katy Perry	Death Magnetic	Metallica	
8 October	"I Kissed a Girl"	Katy Perry	Death Magnetic	Metallica	
15 October	"I Kissed a Girl"	Katy Perry	Death Magnetic	Metallica	
22 October	"So What"	Pink	Death Magnetic	Metallica	
29 October	"So What"	Pink	Black Ice	AC/DC	
5 November	"Infinity 2008"	Guru Josh Project	Black Ice	AC/DC	
13 November	"Infinity 2008"	Guru Josh Project	Black Ice	AC/DC	
20 November	"Infinity 2008"	Guru Josh Project	Black Ice	AC/DC	
27 November	"If I Were a Boy"	Beyoncé	Safe Trip Home	Dido	
3 December	"If I Were a Boy"	Beyoncé	Chinese Democracy	Guns N' Roses	
10 December	"Womanizer"	Britney Spears	Circus	Britney Spears	
17 December	"Womanizer"	Britney Spears	Black Ice	AC/DC	
24 December	"Hot n Cold"	Katy Perry	Black Ice	AC/DC	
31 December	"If I Were a Boy"	Beyoncé	Black Ice	AC/DC	
