= German Lop =

Breed of rabbit

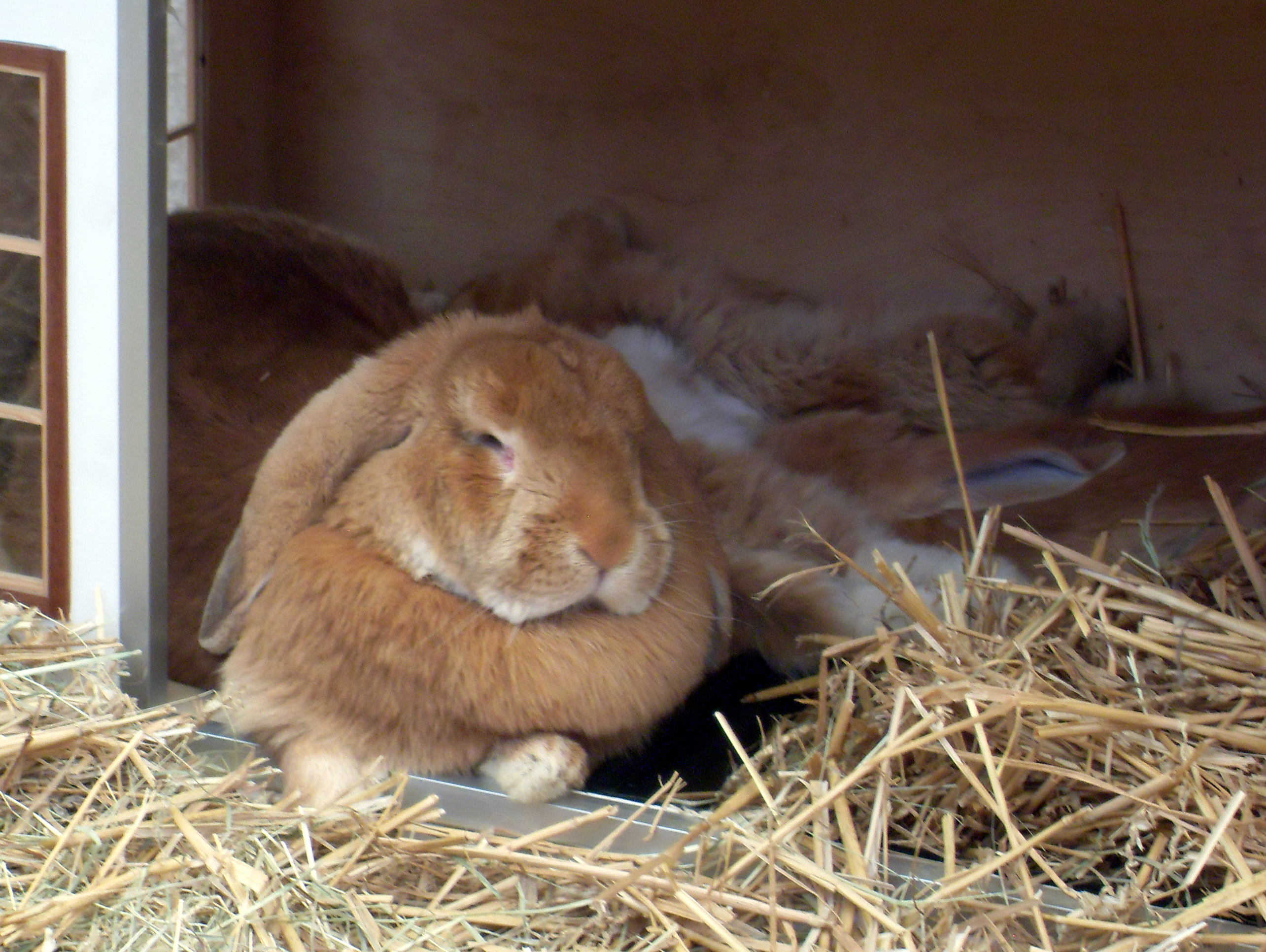
- German Lop rabbits resting

The German Lop rabbit is a recognised breed by the British Rabbit Council (BRC). It is a very chunky and fat Lop rabbit.

The BRC Breed Standard specification sets out the following attributes required for a Rabbit to be declared as a German Lop.

Type - Very thick, hefty and meaty. The neck on a good German Lop should never be visible. Ideally it should be equally as broad in the shoulder as the hindquarters. From a short nape the line of the back should rise in a slight curve to a well-muscled rump which should be short, stout, and well rounded. The front legs are short, straight and thick. The hind legs should lie parallel to the rump and not jutting out when resting. A dewlap in does is highly encouraged.

Head - The head should be strongly developed with a distinct width between the eyes. The German Lop should have a Roman nose appearance with well-developed cheeks.

Ears - The ears should be broad, thick and of good substance, they rise from a strong ridge called the crown on top of the head, carried closely to the cheeks, with the openings turned inwards. The ears should hang down straight just behind the eyes without either being carried forwards or backwards. Ear length, measured across the skull minimum 27.96 cm - maximum 35.5 cm. (11- 14in maximum).

== See also ==
- List of rabbit breeds
- Lop rabbit
