= Kuschel Song =

2008 single by Schnuffel

Single by Schnuffel

from the album Ich hab' Dich lieb
- Language: German
- English title: "Snuggle Song"
- Released: 8 February 2008
- Length: 2:50
- Label: Columbia, Sony BMG
- Songwriters: Sebastian Nussbaum and Andreas Wendorf, Markus Kretschmer, Tamara Luecke
- Producer: Samuel Trevor Francis

Schnuffel singles chronology
"Kuschel Song" (2008)	"Ich hab' Dich lieb" (2008)

"Kuschel Song" (English: "Snuggle Song") is the debut single of the German animated rabbit Schnuffel. Originally published by Jamba! as a ringtone, it was turned into a song by Sebastian Nussbaum and Andreas Marek-Wendorf. Released on 8 February 2008, "Kuschel Song" debuted at the top of the German Singles Chart, staying there for eight weeks, and was certified platinum by the Bundesverband Musikindustrie (BVMI) for 300,000 copies sold. After topping the Austrian Singles Chart and reaching number two in Switzerland, the song was released internationally. "Kuschel Song" was later included as the second track on Schnuffel's debut album, Ich hab' Dich lieb, released the same year.

A video of a person dressed as Schnuffel "singing" the song was created for the track. At the beginning of 2009, Schnuffel received a nomination for the single of the year at the 2008 Echo Music Awards. Later, in 2013, "Kuschel Song" was chosen by the German TV show Die ultimative Chart Show as the most successful jingle of the new millennium. The album Winterwunderland features an acoustic version of the song as the 14th track.

== Track listings ==
- German CD1
1. "Kuschel Song" (single version) – 2:50
2. "Kuschel Song" (karaoke version) – 2:50
- German CD2
1. "Kuschel Song" (single version) – 2:50
2. "Snuggle Song" (English version) – 2:50
- German maxi-CD single
1. "Kuschel Song" (single version) – 2:50
2. "Kuschel Song" (karaoke version) – 2:50
3. "Kuschel Song" (international version) – 2:50
4. "Kuschel Song" (enhanced videoclip) – 2:50
- Dutch CD single
1. "Snuffie Song" (Nederlandse versie) – 2:50
2. "Snuffie Song" (version Francaise) – 2:50
3. "Snuffie Song" (English version) – 2:50
- Portuguese CD single
1. "Canção do orelhinhas" (versão portuguesa) – 2:50
2. "Canção do orelhinhas" (versão karaoke) – 2:50
3. "Canção do orelhinhas" (versão internacional) – 2:50
4. "Canção do orelhinhas" (enhanced videoclip) – 2:50
- Australian CD single
1. "Snuggle Song" – 2:50
2. "Snuggle Song" (video) – 2:50

== Charts ==
=== Weekly charts ===
Chart (2008)	Peak position
Australia (ARIA)	55
Austria (Ö3 Austria Top 40)	1
Europe (Eurochart Hot 100)	5
Germany (GfK)	1
Norway (VG-lista)	6
Sweden (Sverigetopplistan)	52
Switzerland (Schweizer Hitparade)	2

=== Year-end charts ===
Chart (2008)	Position
Austria (Ö3 Austria Top 40)	6
Europe (Eurochart Hot 100)	43
Germany (Media Control GfK)	4
Switzerland (Schweizer Hitparade)	29

== Certifications and sales ==
Region	Certification	Certified units/sales
Austria (IFPI Austria)	Gold	15,000^{*}
Germany (BVMI)	Platinum	300,000^{^}
^{*} Sales figures based on certification alone.^{^} Shipments figures based on certification alone.

== Release history ==
Region	Date	Format(s)	Label(s)	Ref.
Germany	8 February 2008	CD1; maxi-CD	Columbia; Sony BMG	
Germany	14 March 2008	CD2	Columbia; Sony BMG	
