= Schnuffel =

German animated rabbit

- First appearance: "Kuschel Song" (2008)
- Created by: Jamster
- Voiced by: Unknown (German)
- Labels: Columbia • Sony BMG • Ariola
- Years active: 2008–2015
- Origin: Germany

In-universe information
- Aliases: Snuggle Bunny (English), Lapin Câlin (French), Orelhinhas (Portuguese), Kikolo (Italian), Snufi (Spanish and Hungarian), Kramis (Swedish), Snuffie (Dutch), Зайчик Шнуфель (Russian), Σνούφελ το λαγουδάκι (Greek)
- Species: German Lop Rabbit
- Gender: Male

Schnuffel (German pronunciation: [ˈʃnʊfəl]; English: Snuggle, French: Lapin Câlin, Italian: Kikolo, Spanish: Snufi) is an animated rabbit created in 2007 by the German media company Jamba!.

== Conception and creation ==
The first concepts of the Schnuffel character were born on 2 July 2007. Due to the success of the original ringtone (released on 2 January 2008 exclusively on the Jamba website), it was later turned into a song by Sebastian Nussbaum and Andreas Wendorf, and recorded under the title Kuschel Song ("Cuddling song"). The German singing voice of Schnuffel is unknown, although it is known that they were an employee of Jamster. The single was released in February 2008 and quickly topped the German and European charts. After the song went to the top of the Austrian charts and number 2 in Switzerland, plans were made to release the song internationally. Songs were translated into 13 languages, and 13 albums have since been released, including German re-editions and international albums.

Since the creation of Schnuffel, several apps have been created featuring the character, including a "virtual pet" and an educational game.

== Schnuffelienchen ==
Schnuffelienchen

Schnuffel's female counterpart and girlfriend is named Schnuffelienchen, known in English as Snuggelina. Like Schnuffel, she is a lop rabbit. Schnuffelienchen's first CD single, "Küss mich, halt mich, lieb mich" (Kiss me, hold me, love me), a cover of the 2009 Ella Endlich hit (which in turn is based on the theme composition of the 1973 film Drei Haselnüsse für Aschenbrödel), was released on 29 October 2010, and stayed 1 week at the 99th position of the German charts. Her second single, "Schmetterling" (Butterfly) was released on 28 February 2012 only on the Jamba/Jamster sites, and released digitally on Amazon, iTunes and Google Play only on 25 July 2014, together with the English version. Schnuffelienchen's third single "Ohne Dich" (Without You) was released on 26 September 2014, as a digital download.

== Achievements ==
"Kuschel Song" was the fourth best-selling single of 2008 in Germany, and the song received a nomination for Single of the Year at the 2008 Echo Music Awards. In 2013, "Kuschel Song" was chosen by the German TV show Die ultimative Chart Show as the most successful jingle of the new millennium.

== Discography ==
=== Albums ===
List of albums, with selected chart positions and certifications
Title	Year	Chart positions						Certifications
Title	Year	GER	AUT	EUR	HUN	SWI	GR	Certifications
Ich hab' Dich lieb (I love you)	2008	11	1	37	6	50	—	BVMI: Gold; IFPI AUT: Gold
Winterwunderland (Winterwonderland)	2008	44	18	—	—	—	4	
Komm Kuscheln (Come cuddle)	2009	78	20	—	40	—	6	

=== Singles ===
List of singles, with selected chart positions and certifications
Title	Year	Chart positions										Certifications	Album
Title	Year	GER	AUS	AUT	BEL	EUR	FRA	NLD	NOR	SWE	SWI	Certifications	Album
"Kuschel Song"/"Snuggle Song"	2008	1	55	1	21	5	—	30	6	52	2	BVMI: Platinum; IFPI AUT: Gold	Ich hab' Dich lieb
"Ich hab' Dich lieb" (I Love You)	2008	23	—	13	—	91	—	—	—	34	80		Ich hab' Dich lieb
"Häschenparty" (Bunnyparty) (solo or featuring Michael Wendler)	2008	16	—	29	—	24	29	—	—	—	—		Ich hab' Dich lieb
"Schnuffels Weihnachtslied" (Schnuffel's Christmas Song)	2008	23	—	33	—	—	—	—	—	—	—		Winterwunderland
"Piep Piep" (Beep Beep)	2009	54	—	33	—	—	—	—	—	—	—		Komm Kuscheln
"Küss mich, halt mich, lieb mich" (Kiss Me, Hold Me, Love Me) (Ella Endlich cover, by Schnuffelienchen)	2010	99	—	—	—	—	—	—	—	—	—		
"Dubidubi Du" (Doo bee doo bee doo)	2011	—	—	—	—	—	—	—	—	—	—		
"Tut, Tut, Tut" (Toot Toot Toot) (only ringtone)	2011	—	—	—	—	—	—	—	—	—	—		
"Jingle Bells" (featuring other Jamba stars, including Schnuffelienchen)	2011	—	—	—	—	—	—	—	—	—	—		
"Schmetterling" (Butterfly) (by Schnuffelienchen)	2012	—	—	—	—	—	—	—	—	—	—		
"Ohne Dich" (Without You) (by Schnuffelienchen)	2014	—	—	—	—	—	—	—	—	—	—		

== Audio books ==
All of the Schnuffel audio books were produced and written by Kai Hohage.

- 2008: Das Geheimnis der Möhre (The Secret of the Carrot)
- 2009: Die bezaubernde Prinzessin (The Charming Princess)
- 2009: Die kleinen Purzelsterne (The Little Shooting Stars)
- 2010: Kuschelbox 1 (containing the first three audiobooks)
- 2010: Der Schatz im Glitzersee (The Treasure in the Glittering Sea)
- 2010: Die kleine Schneefee (The Little Snow Fairy)
- 2011: Das Baby-Einhorn (The Baby Unicorn)
- 2012: Knuddelbox 2 (containing the 4th, 5th and 6th audio books)
- 2013: Abenteuer auf der Trauminsel (Adventure on the Dream Island)
- 2014: Das Geheimnis der kleinen Eule (The Secret of the Little Owl)

== See also ==
- Crazy Frog
- Gummibär
- Schnappi
- Holly Dolly
- René la Taupe
- Mickael Turtle
