= Stratton Sclavos =

Stratton Sclavos (born 1961) is an entrepreneur, chief executive, and venture investor in the technology, professional sports and lifestyle industries. He is currently a partner at Vision Venture Partners.

He was chairman and CEO of VeriSign Inc., a security services and network infrastructure company, from 1995 to 2007, leading the company for over a decade as VeriSign grew into a NASDAQ-traded corporation with over 5,000 employees, $1.7 billion in annual revenues and a market value of over $25 billion. As a recognized expert in internet security and telecommunications infrastructure, he sat on the President of the United States' National Security Telecommunications Advisory Committee and was a senior advisor to the Director of National Intelligence.

Sclavos was a general partner at Radar Partners, a Silicon Valley–based venture capital firm. Radar invests in early-stage technology companies such as BitGo, DUO Security and Sencha, and has seen recent successful exits of Appurify, Lattice Strategies, Pure Logic, and Sensity Systems. Sclavos also had a substantial stake in Shark Sports & Entertainment, the parent company of the San Jose Sharks professional hockey team from 2001 to 2015, acting as Managing General Partner and CEO from 2011 thru 2015. Additionally, he has created or invested in restaurants, boutique hotels, and sports and wellness beverages.

Sclavos has a Bachelor of Science in electrical and computer engineering from the University of California, Davis. Sclavos joined VeriSign in 1995 as one of its first employees. Sclavos also sits on the board of directors of several public companies including Intuit, Juniper Networks, and Salesforce.com as well as sits on the University of Southern California (USC) President's Leadership Council.
