= Michael Wendler =

German singer (born 1972)

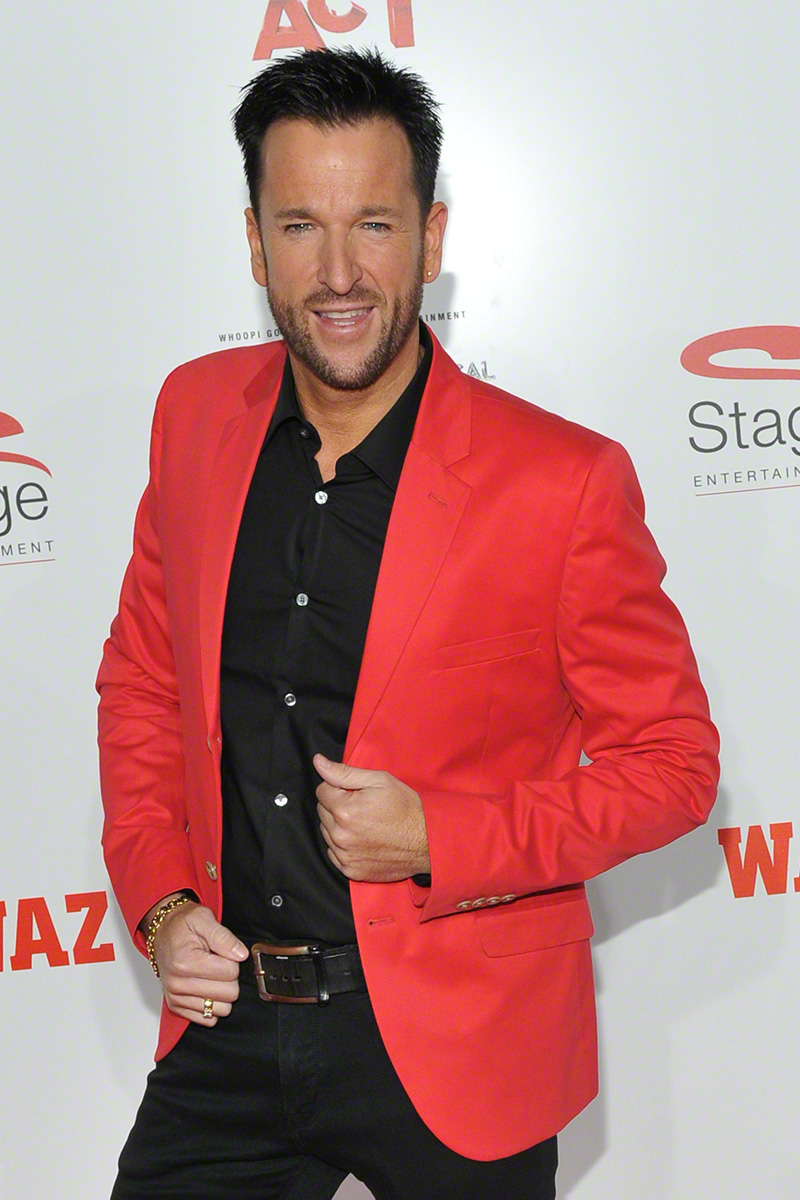
- Wendler in 2013

Background information
- Also known as: Legal names: Michael Skowronek, Michael Norberg; Pseudonym: Mic Skowy (for songwriting)
- Born: Michael Skowronek; 22 July 1972 (age 54); Dinslaken, West Germany
- Genres: Pop, Schlager
- Occupation: Singer
- Years active: 1998–present
- Spouses: Claudia Norberg (m. 2009; div. 2020); Laura Müller (m. 2020)

Michael Wendler (born Michael Skowronek, 22 June 1972; legal name after his marriage in 2009 Michael Norberg; also known as Der Wendler) is a German pop schlager singer, television personality and conspiracy theorist. Since his breakthrough in 1998, he has won several awards such as the prestigious Crown of the Folk Music 2012. He has been under contract with Sony Entertainment for many years and has a total of six gold records and one platinum. Wendler also writes songs and lyrics for other Schlager singers under the pseudonym Mic Skowy.

== Life ==
Wendler was born in Dinslaken. He is of Polish origin. In March 2009, he married his partner of many years, Claudia Norberg in a civil wedding on Sylt and in April 2009 had a church wedding on Mallorca. He sold the image rights to the wedding to women's magazine Die Neue. They have a daughter, Adeline, born in 2002.

On 9 January 2010, he was presented with the Crown of Folk Music Award. He settled in Dinslaken, building a compound with horse stables, which was completed at the end of 2010.

In September 2011, Wendler and Markus Krampe opened the "Nina", a discothèque in Bottrop, where pop artists perform live. Another offshoot of the successful nightclub was opened in Cologne.

In 2016, Wendler moved his family to Cape Coral, Florida, where he continues to write and perform in both the US and Germany.

In 2020, he divorced Claudia Norberg and married 20-year-old Laura Müller, whom he had been in a relationship with since 2018. She left school without graduating and decided to move to Florida with him. They have two sons, Rome Aston and Ocean Amor, born in June 2023 and December 2024, respectively.

== TV appearances ==
In January 2010, The Wendler Clan was aired on the popular German television network Sat.1 in a six-part reality soap broadcast featuring Wendler. In January 2014, Wendler took part in German reality show Ich bin ein Star – Holt mich hier raus! on the RTL (TV network). In 2015, he participated in the TV show Ich bin ein Star – Lasst mich wieder rein! Although he was injured during the taping of an episode and had to pull out, he still got the most votes in the final show. He was hurt in a bungee cord accident and broke his right wrist suffering a compound fracture, which required an emergency operation. From 15 August 2014 to 29 August 2014, Wendler participated in the Promi Big Brother reality programme and finished in fifth place. In 2021, he was a judge in talent show Deutschland sucht den Superstar. Due to conspirancy theories about the COVID-19 pandemic, he left the panel after the auditions were filmed. After being criticized again for his views, the broadcaster decided to cut the singer out of all episodes.

== Controversial opinions ==
In 2020, Wendler was the centre of a public debate due to his remarks about the COVID-19 pandemic. He accused the German government of 'gross and severe violations' of the constitution. He suggested that all German TV channels, including RTL (for whom he worked), were gleichgeschaltet (a term associated with Nazi Germany) and politically controlled. He urged his followers to create a Telegram account, claiming that this would be the only opportunity to exchange views without censorship. Following the introduction of more restrictive policies to reduce the spread of COVID-19 in January 2021, Wendler compared the German state with a concentration camp.

Wendler publicly supported the far-right AfD Saxony-Anhalt during the 2026 regional parliament election.

== Discography ==
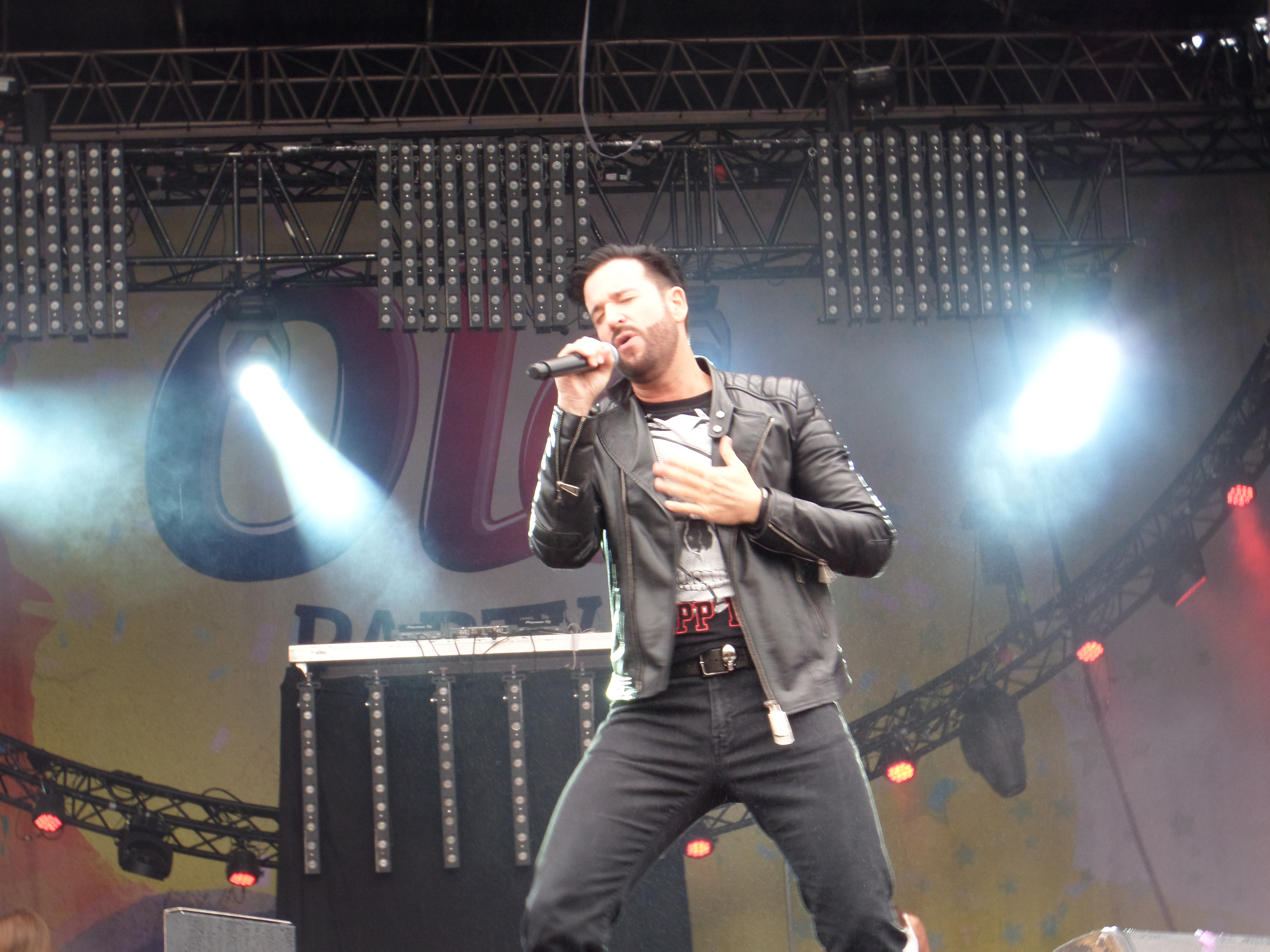
Wendler performing in 2017

=== Albums ===
- Best Of – Vol. I (2008)
- Respekt (2009)

=== Singles ===
- Das ist ja wohl ein Ding (2001)
- Das haut mich um (2001)
- Nicht mehr in diesem Leben (2001)
- Dein kleiner Prinz (2001)
- Alibi (2002)
- Außer Kontrolle (2002)
- Verlier sie nie (2002)
- Oh lieber Gott (2003)
- Seitensprünge (2003)
- Warum lügen die Sterne (2003)
- Traue keinem über 30 (2004)
- Unsterblich (2004)
- Marterpfahl (2004)
- Zauberer (2004)
- Sie liebt den DJ (2005)
- Wenn alle Stricke reißen (2005)
- 180 Grad (2005)
- Heuchler (2006)
- Prinzessin (2006)
- Mein letztes Gebet (2007)
- Das schönste Girl der Welt (2007)
- Sie liebt den DJ (2007)
- Dennoch liebst du mich (2007)
- Nina (2008)
- Echolot (2008)
- Häschenparty (remix) (2008) (with Schnuffel)
- Ich denk an Weihnachten (2008) (production by Luis Rodriguez)
- I Don't Know (2009)
- Nina – Reloaded (2009)
- Wer weiß warum (2010)
- Piloten wie wir (2010)
- Wir sind Tänzer (2011)
- Sie liebt ihn immer noch (DJ Teil 2)/In the Heat of the Night (2011)
- Was wäre wenn (July 2012)
- Nie mehr (February 2013)
- Honey Kiss (April 2013) (with Anika)
- Unser Zelt auf Westerland (January 2014)
- Die Maske fällt (2015)
- Wie beim ersten Mal (2016)
- Gut, dass Männer nie weinen (2017)
- Wir war'n, wir sind, wir bleiben (2017)
- Egal (2017)
- Was soll ich im Himmel (2019)
- Was man liebt, gibt man frei (2020)

== Autobiography ==
- Michael Wendler (2010). Die Faust des Schlagers. Munich: riva. ISBN 978-3-86883-065-1.
