= Freenet AG =

German telecommunications company

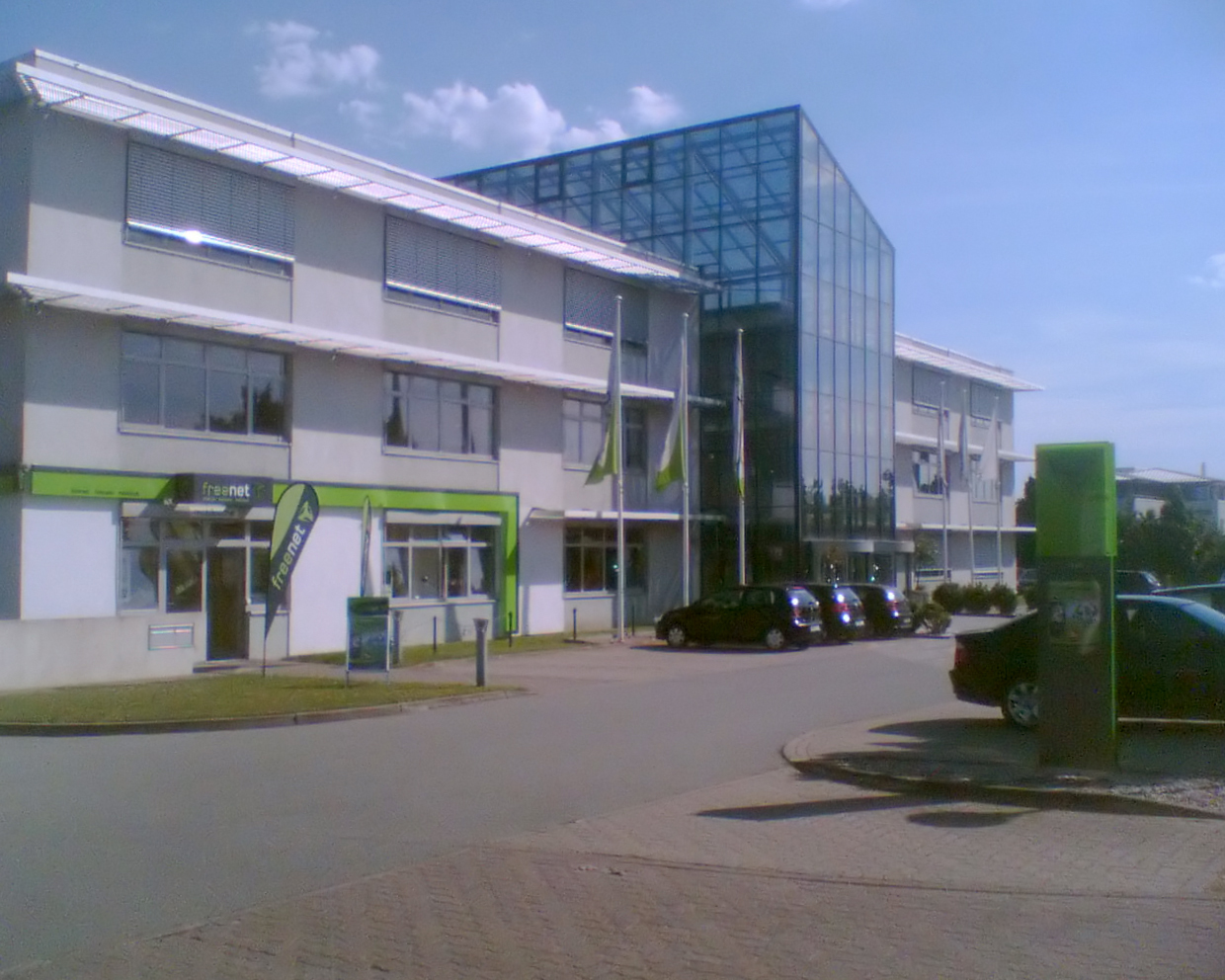
- Headquarters in Büdelsdorf
- Company type: Aktiengesellschaft
- Traded as: FWB: FNTN; MDAX
- Industry: Telecommunications
- Founded: 2007; 19 years ago
- Headquarters: Büdelsdorf, Germany
- Key people: Robin John Andes Harries (CEO); Ingo Arnold (CFO); Marc Tüngler (Chairman of the Supervisory Board)
- Products: Mobile telecommunications, web content
- Revenue: ▲€2.439 billion (2025)
- Operating income: 246,100,000 (2023)
- Net income: 154,600,000 (2023)
- Total assets: 3,414,900,000 (2023)
- Number of employees: 3,326 (2025)
- Website: www.freenet.ag

Freenet AG (formerly freenet.de AG) is a German telecommunications and web content provider. The company was formerly a subsidiary of Mobilcom. In 2004, its EBITDA was 471.5 million euro. In 2007, Freenet.de merged with Mobilcom, a deal which took around two years to complete, and the resulting company changed its name to Freenet AG. In July 2008, Freenet AG acquired debitel AG, another German telecommunications company.

The company was formerly active in the provision of broadband Internet services, but sold this unit to United Internet for €123 million in 2009. At the end of February 2022, it was announced that the Mobilcom-Debitel brand would be discontinued in July of the same year in favor of freenet. The changeover took place on 13 July and the company has additionally been renamed freenet DLS.
