= Idols South Africa season 2 =

Idols South Africa
- Season 2
- Hosted by: Colin Moss
- Judges: Dave Thompson; Marah Louw; Gareth Cliff; Randall Abrahams
- Winner: Anke Pietrangeli
- Runner-up: Poseletso Sejosingoe
- Finals venue: Gold Reef City Hippodrome Theatre

Release
- Original network: MNet
- Original release: 22 June – 20 October 2003

Season chronology
- ← Previous; Season 1 Next → Season 3

Idols South Africa II was the second season of South African reality interactive talent show based on the British talent show Pop Idol. It was aired from June 2003, exactly one year after the first season ended, to October of the same year. With Colin Moss and Letoya Makhene new hosts were introduced and half of the judging panel was replaced as Mara Louw and Gareth Cliff replaced Penny Lebyane and Marcus Brewster.

The number of finalists was increased to 12 but only two male contestants made it through the semifinal group of the top 32: Jacques Terre'Blanche and Wafeeq Saffodien who both eventually managed to reach the top 5. Originally chosen as a wildcard winner, Francisca Blasisch suddenly quit and was replaced by Khwezi Kekana in the top 12 where she was voted off in the first liveshow.

Several contestants would return for subsequent seasons. Semifinalist Bianca Bronn returned the following season, although once more failed to advance into the Top 12. Noluthando "Nolly" Meje, who tied for 11th place, would later return for season seven, reaching tenth place. Meanwhile, one of the other semifinalists, Dewald Louw, would go on to become the sole winner of Afrikaanse Idols.

Due to technical issues, the voting was voided in the week of 28 September where the contestants where singing songs by John Lennon and Paul McCartney. Thus, nobody was sent home that week, and the votes were carried over into the following week, in which two contestants were eliminated instead.

On 20 October 2003 Anke Pietrangeli, who was nicknamed The Kimberley Diamond by her supporters, won over fellow-finalist Poseletso Sejosingoe in the Gold Reef City Hippodrome Theatre.

== Finals ==
=== Finalists ===
(ages stated at time of contest)

Contestant	Age	Hometown	Voted Off	Spectacular Theme
Anke Pietrangeli	19	Kimberley	Winner	Grand Finale
Poseletso Sejosingoe	18	Lotus River	19 October 2003	Grand Finale
Jacques Terre'Blanche	20	Tamboerskloof, Cape Town	13 October 2003	Viewer's Choice
Nazneen Leeman	17	Belgravia, Cape Town	6 October 2003	My Idols
Wafeeq Saffodien	17	Mountview, Lansdowne	6 October 2003	My Idols
Kgomotso Tsatsi	16	Observatory Ext.	22 September 2003	Y2K
Karen Ferreira	18	Centurion, Pretoria	15 September 2003	Big Band Night
Zama Sithole	19	Vosloosrus	8 September 2003	Movie Magic
Petro De Villiers	20	Centurion, Pretoria	1 September 2003	Proudly South African
Thelma Jansen	19	George	1 September 2003	Proudly South African
Khwezi Kekana	19	Diepkloof	24 August 2003	Award Winning Songs
Noluthando Meje	16	Tamboerskloof, Cape Town	24 August 2003	Award Winning Songs

== Elimination chart ==
Legend
Did Not Perform	Female	Male	Top 24	Wild Card	Top 12	Winner

Safe	Bottom 3	Bottom 2	Eliminated

Stage:		Semi Finals					Finals								
Weeks:		07/20	07/27	08/03	08/10	08/17	08/24	09/01	09/08	09/15	09/22	09/29	10/06	10/13	10/20
Place	Contestant	Result													
1	Anke Pietrangeli				1										Winner
2	Poseletso Sejosingoe			2							Btm3				Runner-up
3	Jacques Terre'Blanche		1								Btm2		Btm3	Elim	
4–5	Nazneen Leeman			1									Elim		
4–5	Wafeeq Saffodien				2				Btm3	Btm3			Elim		
6	Kgomotso Tsatsi				Elim	JURY			Btm2	Btm2	Elim				
7	Karen Ferreira		2				Btm3	Btm3		Elim					
8	Zama Sithole			Elim		1			Elim						
9–10	Petro De Villiers	1						Elim							
9–10	Thelma Jansen	2						Elim							
11–12	Khwezi Kekana	Elim				Elim	Elim								
11–12	Noluthando Meje		Elim			JURY	Elim								
13	Francisca Blasich		Elim			2	Quit								

- Because Francisca quit after she made the finals, Khwezi replaced her
- On 29 September there have been issues with counting the lines so the vote was voided that week

=== Live show details ===
==== Heat 1 (20 July 2003) ====
Order	Artist	Song (original artists)	Result
1	Thelma Jansen	"Beautiful" (Christina Aguilera)	Advanced
2	Granville Williams	"Shallow Waters" (Just Jinjer)	Wildcard
3	Anastacia Fortuin	"I'm Not a Girl, Not Yet a Woman" (Britney Spears)	Eliminated
4	Edith Thwala	"A Thousand Miles" (Vanessa Carlton)	Eliminated
5	Musa Ndlovu	"Over the Rainbow" (Judy Garland)	Eliminated
6	Petro De Villiers	"Thank U" (Alanis Morissette)	Advanced
7	Mlami Ngiza	"Honesty" (Billy Joel)	Eliminated
8	Noluthando Meje	"Just a Little" (Liberty X)	Wildcard

Notes

- Petro De Villiers and Thelma Jansen advanced to the top 12 of the competition. The other 6 contestants were eliminated.
- Granville Williams and Noluthando Meje returned for a second chance at the top 12 in the Wildcard Round.

==== Heat 2 (27 July 2003) ====
Order	Artist	Song (original artists)	Result
1	Cizario Roberts	"Ain't No Sunshine" (Bill Withers)	Eliminated
2	Francisca Blasich	"Smile" (Charlie Chaplin)	Wildcard
3	Dewald Louw	"Paint My Love" (Michael Learns to Rock)	Eliminated
4	Bonolo Thekiso	"Pretty Baby" (Vanessa Carlton)	Wildcard
5	Clayton Felix	"If You Come Back" (Blue)	Eliminated
6	Jacques Terre'Blanche	"If You're Not the One" (Daniel Bedingfield)	Advanced
7	Khwezi Kekana	"Be with You" (Atomic Kitten)	Wildcard
8	Karen Ferreira	"Searchin' My Soul" (Vonda Shepard)	Advanced

Notes

- Jacques Terre'Blanche and Karen Ferreira advanced to the top 12 of the competition. The other 6 contestants were eliminated.
- Francisca Blasich, Bonolo Thekiso, and Khwezi Kekana returned for a second chance at the top 12 in the Wildcard Round.

==== Heat 3 (3 August 2003) ====
Order	Artist	Song (original artists)	Result
1	Monde Msuthwana	"Unchained Melody" (The Righteous Brothers)	Eliminated
2	Bianca Bronn	"Out of Reach" (Gabrielle)	Eliminated
3	Lesedi Job	"Georgia on My Mind" (Ray Charles)	Eliminated
4	Nazneen Leeman	"Sunny Came Home" (Shawn Colvin)	Advanced
5	Lwazi Mkhize	"How Am I Supposed to Live Without You" (Michael Bolton)	Wildcard
6	Zama Sithole	"You Can't Hurry Love" (The Supremes)	Wildcard
7	Andy Milner	"I Say a Little Prayer" (Aretha Franklin)	Wildcard
8	Poseletso Sejosingoe	"I Drove All Night" (Cyndi Lauper)	Advanced

Notes

- Nazneen Leeman and Poseletso Sejosingoe advanced to the top 12 of the competition. The other 6 contestants were eliminated.
- Lwazi Mkhize, Zama Sithole, and Andy Milner returned for a second chance at the top 12 in the Wildcard Round.

==== Heat 4 (10 August 2003) ====
Order	Artist	Song (original artists)	Result
1	Anke Pietrangeli	"Unforgettable" (Nat King Cole)	Advanced
2	Wafeeq Saffodien	"If You Leave Me Now" (Chicago)	Advanced
3	Sibongile Simelane	"Every Single Thing" (Melanie Lowe)	Eliminated
4	Kgomotso Tsatsi	"My Guy" (Mary Wells)	Wildcard
5	Palesa Moeketsi	"Always Be My Baby" (Mariah Carey)	Eliminated
6	Clive Gumede	"On the Wings of Love" (Jeffrey Osborne)	Eliminated
7	Michelle Williamson	"Torn" (Natalie Imbruglia)	Eliminated
8	Irene Van Der Merwe	"You're Still the One" (Shania Twain)	Eliminated

Notes

- Anke Pietrangeli and Wafeeq Saffodien advanced to the top 12 of the competition. The other 6 contestants were eliminated.
- Kgomotso Tsatsi returned for a second chance at the top 12 in the Wildcard Round.

==== Wildcard round (17 August 2003) ====
Order	Artist	Song (original artists)	Result
1	Kgomotso Tsatsi	"Uninvited" (Alanis Morissette)	Advanced
2	Noluthando Meje	"Chuck E.'s In Love" (Rickie Lee Jones)	Advanced
3	Bonolo Thekiso	"Life" (Des'ree)	Eliminated
4	Granville Williams	"What Becomes of the Brokenhearted" (Jimmy Ruffin)	Eliminated
5	Andy Milner	"The NeverEnding Story" (Limahl)	Eliminated
6	Lwazi Mkhize	"To Be with You" (Mr. Big)	Eliminated
7	Khwezi Kekana	"I Don't Want to Wait" (Paula Cole)	Eliminated
8	Francisca Blasich	"I Have Nothing" (Whitney Houston)	Advanced
9	Zama Sithole	"Lady Marmalade" (Christina Aguilera, Pink, Lil' Kim, & Mýa)	Advanced

Notes

- The judges selected Kgomotso Tsatsi and Noluthando Meje to move on into the Top 12 of the competition, before the hosts revealed the Top 3 vote getters. Zama Sithole and Francisca Blasich received most votes, and completed the top 12.

==== Live Show 1 (24 August 2003) ====
Theme: Award Winning Songs

Order	Artist	Song (original artists)	Result
1	Jacques Terre'Blanche	"I Write the Songs" (Barry Manilow)	Safe
2	Petro De Villiers	"The First Time Ever I Saw Your Face" (Roberta Flack)	Safe
3	Noluthando Meje	"Never Knew Love Like This Before" (Stephanie Mills)	Eliminated
4	Thelma Jansen	"Without You" (Mariah Carey)	Safe
5	Poseletso Sejosingoe	"Bridge Over Troubled Water" (Simon & Garfunkel)	Safe
6	Karen Ferreira	"Bette Davis Eyes" (Kim Carnes)	Bottom three
7	Nazneen Leeman	"If You Don't Know Me by Now" (Simply Red)	Safe
8	Wafeeq Saffodien	"I'll Make Love to You" (Boyz II Men)	Safe
9	Zama Sithole	"Change the World" (Eric Clapton)	Safe
10	Anke Pietrangeli	"Don't Know Why" (Norah Jones)	Safe
11	Kgomotso Tsatsi	"Have I Told You Lately" (Rod Stewart)	Safe
12	Khwezi Kekana	"Don't Leave Me This Way" (Thelma Houston)	Eliminated

==== Live Show 2 (31 August 2003) ====
Theme: Proudly South African

Order	Artist	Song (original artists)	Result
1	Wafeeq Saffodien	"Secret Places" (Mean Mr. Mustard)	Safe
2	Karen Ferreira	"Life" (Semisane)	Bottom three
3	Nazneen Leeman	"The Spaniard" (Lesley Rae Dowling)	Safe
4	Thelma Jansen	"Rain" (SpoonFeedas)	Eliminated
5	Zama Sithole	"Please Stay" (Jonathan Butler)	Safe
6	Jacques Terre'Blanche	"Weeping" (Bright Blue)	Safe
7	Kgomotso Tsatsi	"A Cry, a Smile, a Dance" (Judith Sephuma)	Safe
8	Petro De Villiers	"Like You Madly" (Just Jinger)	Eliminated
9	Anke Pietrangeli	"Moments Away" (Mango Groove)	Safe
10	Poseletso Sejosingoe	"Meadowlands" (Miriam Makeba)	Safe

==== Live Show 3 (7 September 2003) ====
Theme: Movie Magic

Order	Artist	Song (original artists)	Result
1	Poseletso Sejosingoe	"Flashdance... What a Feeling" (Irene Cara)	Safe
2	Jacques Terre'Blanche	"Love Is in the Air" (John Paul Young)	Safe
3	Nazneen Leeman	"Love Is All Around" (Wet Wet Wet)	Safe
4	Karen Ferreira	"Hopelessly Devoted to You" (Olivia Newton-John)	Safe
5	Zama Sithole	"Last Dance" (Donna Summer)	Eliminated
6	Anke Pietrangeli	"Independent Love Song" (Scarlet)	Safe
7	Wafeeq Saffodien	"Mustang Sally" (Wilson Pickett)	Bottom three
8	Kgomotso Tsatsi	"Respect" (Aretha Franklin)	Bottom three

==== Live Show 4 (14 September 2003) ====
Theme: Big Band

Order	Artist	Song (original artists)	Result
1	Anke Pietrangeli	"It Had to Be You" (Harry Connick, Jr.)	Safe
2	Wafeeq Saffodien	"My Way" (Frank Sinatra)	Bottom three
3	Karen Ferreira	"Straighten Up and Fly Right" (Nat King Cole)	Eliminated
4	Kgomotso Tsatsi	"Fly Me to the Moon" (Frank Sinatra)	Bottom two
5	Nazneen Leeman	"Witchcraft" (Frank Sinatra)	Safe
6	Poseletso Sejosingoe	"They Can't Take That Away from Me" (Frank Sinatra)	Safe
7	Jacques Terre'Blanche	"Bad, Bad Leroy Brown" (Frank Sinatra)	Safe

==== Live Show 5 (21 September 2003) ====
Theme: Y2K

Order	Artist	Song (original artists)	Result
1	Kgomotso Tsatsi	"Show Me the Meaning of Being Lonely" (Backstreet Boys)	Eliminated
2	Anke Pietrangeli	"Here I Am" (Bryan Adams)	Safe
3	Wafeeq Saffodien	"Uptown Girl" (Westlife)	Safe
4	Poseletso Sejosingoe	"The Way You Love Me" (Faith Hill)	Bottom three
5	Jacques Terre'Blanche	"Universally Speaking" (Red Hot Chili Peppers)	Bottom two
6	Nazneen Leeman	"Forever and for Always" (Shania Twain)	Safe

==== Live Show 6 (28 September 2003) ====
Theme: My Idol

Order	Artist	First song (original artists)	Second song	Result
1	Wafeeq Saffodien	"Let Me Entertain You" (Robbie Williams)	"Angels"	Safe
2	Anke Pietrangeli	"Cry" (Faith Hill)	"There You'll Be"	Safe
3	Jacques Terre'Blanche	"Crying" (Roy Orbison)	"Oh, Pretty Woman"	Safe
4	Nazneen Leeman	"The Shoop Shoop Song (It's in His Kiss)" (Cher)	"Strong Enough"	Safe
5	Poseletso Sejosingoe	"You Light Up My Life" (Whitney Houston)	"I Wanna Dance with Somebody (Who Loves Me)"	Safe

==== Live Show 7 (5 October 2003) ====
Theme: Lennon & McCartney

Order	Artist	First song	Second song	Result
1	Poseletso Sejosingoe	"Ob-La-Di, Ob-La-Da"	"Let It Be"	Safe
2	Nazneen Leeman	"Imagine"	"With a Little Help from My Friends"	Eliminated
3	Jacques Terre'Blanche	"Norwegian Wood (This Bird Has Flown)"	"Woman"	Bottom three
4	Wafeeq Saffodien	"In My Life"	"A Hard Day's Night"	Eliminated
5	Anke Pietrangeli	"Yesterday"	"From Me to You"	Safe

==== Live Show 8: Semi-final (12 October 2003) ====
Theme: Viewers' Choice

Order	Artist	First song (original artists)	Second song	Third song	Result
1	Anke Pietrangeli	"Like a Prayer" (Madonna)	"True Colors" (Cyndi Lauper)	"I Don't Want to Miss a Thing" (Aerosmith)	Safe
2	Jacques Terre'Blanche	"More Than Words" (Extreme)	"Arthur's Theme (Best That You Can Do)" (Christopher Cross)	"Amazed" (Lonestar)	Eliminated
3	Poseletso Sejosingoe	"Don't Let the Sun Go Down on Me" (Elton John)	"Save the Best for Last" (Vanessa Williams)	"Thank You" (Dido)	Safe

==== Live final (19 October 2003) ====
Artist	First song	Second song	Third song	Result
Poseletso Sejosingoe	"Bridge Over Troubled Water"	"You Light Up My Life"	"Silver Lining"	Runner-up
Anke Pietrangeli	"Independent Love Song"	"Unforgettable"	"Silver Lining"	Winner
