= Idols South Africa season 1 =

Idols South Africa
- Season 1
- Hosted by: Candy Litchfield; Sami Sabitiin; Matthew Stewardson
- Judges: Dave Thompson; Marcus Brewster; Penny Lebyane; Randall Abrahams
- Winner: Heinz Winckler
- Runner-up: Brandon October
- Finals venue: Vodaworld

Release
- Original network: MNet
- Original release: 10 March – 17 June 2002

Season chronology
- Next → Season 2

Idols South Africa I was the first season of South African reality interactive talent show based on the British talent show Pop Idol. It started as the second international spin-off of the original series just days after the first Idol season in Poland. However, as it ended earlier the winner Heinz Winckler is the second Idol winner after the original Pop Idol Will Young.

Simon Cowell, judge of the original series was guest judging during the theater round when the Top 50 was chosen. The remaining contestants where then split in 10 groups of 5 where the most vote getter would move on to the top 10. However, due to a voting error during the first group's voting, Melanie Lowe, who closely trailed Brandon October, was saved by the producers, resulting in the top 11 instead.

In the beginning the show was hosted by Matthew Stewardson and Candy Litchfield. However halfway through the season Stewardson was axed and replaced by Sami Sabitiin. Soon after that Stewardson checked himself into a rehab center. The show saw a tragic incident when the programme's main photographer suddenly died during the competition. In the course of the season complaints about the results of votings and technical problems became loud and created a mistrust from the audience which eventually lasted over the upcoming seasons.

== Finals ==
=== Finalists ===
Finalist	Age *	From	Status
David Fourie	21	Bloemfontein	Eliminated 1st in Week 1
Nicole Billingham	23	Ferndale	Eliminated 2nd in Week 1
Rian Swanepoel	20	Hatfield	Eliminated 3rd in Week 1
Lyndle Kearns	17	Rocklands	Eliminated 4th in Week 2
Cindy Bester	19	East London	Eliminated 5th in Week 2
Ezra Lingeveldt	21	Sea Point	Eliminated 6th in Week 3
Ayanda Nhlangothi	19	Durban	Eliminated 7th in Week 3
Bianca Le Grange	20	Johannesburg	Eliminated 8th in Week 4
Melanie Lowe	26	Vredehoek	Third
Brandon October	25	Johannesburg	Runner-up
Heinz Winckler	24	Stellenbosch	Winner

* as of the start of the season

== Heats and live shows ==
=== Results summary ===
Legend
Did Not Perform	Female	Male	Top 50	Wild Card	Top 12	Winner

Safe	Saved first	Saved last	Eliminated

Stage:		Semi					Finals				
Week:		04/14	04/21	04/27	05/05	05/12	05/20	05/27	06/03	06/10	06/17
Place	Contestant	Result									
1	Heinz Winckler				Top 11						Winner
2	Brandon October	Top 11							Btm 3		Runner-Up
3	Melanie Lowe	Saved					Btm 5			Btm 2	Elim
4	Bianca Le Grange			Top 11						Elim	
5-6	Ayanda Nhlangothi				Top 11				Elim		
5-6	Ezra Lingeveldt					Top 11		Btm 3	Elim		
7-8	Cindy Bester	Top 11					Btm 4	Elim			
7-8	Lyndle Kearns					Top 11		Elim			
9-11	Rian Swanepoel		Top 11				Elim				
9-11	Nicole Billingham		Top 11				Elim				
9-11	David Fourie			Top 11			Elim				
Semi- Final 10	Boitumelo Masemola					Elim					
Semi- Final 10	Hybre Africa					Elim					
Semi- Final 10	Lauren Laing					Elim					
Semi- Final 10	Mallisan Scholtz					Elim					
Semi- Final 9	Gugulethu Shezi					Elim					
Semi- Final 9	Monique Steyn					Elim					
Semi- Final 9	Nombulelo Mntaka					Elim					
Semi- Final 9	Zure Classen					Elim					
Semi- Final 8	Dalen Jooste				Elim						
Semi- Final 8	Letoya Makhene				Elim						
Semi- Final 8	Liana Van Zyl				Elim						
Semi- Final 8	Chad Saaiman				Elim						
Semi- Final 7	Darren Green				Elim						
Semi- Final 7	Karlien Husselman				Elim						
Semi- Final 7	Kim August				Elim						
Semi- Final 7	Lize Nuttall				Elim						
Semi- Final 6	Francois Mulder			Elim							
Semi- Final 6	Michelle Williamson			Elim							
Semi- Final 6	Nicola Warwick			Elim							
Semi- Final 6	Vanessa Grebe			Elim							
Semi- Final 5	Angelique Campher			Elim							
Semi- Final 5	Bulelwa Ngomane			Elim							
Semi- Final 5	Lauren Chesling			Elim							
Semi- Final 5	Rebert Roodbol			Elim							
Semi- Final 4	Duke Motlanthe		Elim								
Semi- Final 4	Elana Forbes		Elim								
Semi- Final 4	Kim Milner		Elim								
Semi- Final 4	Philadelphia Shayi		Elim								
Semi- Final 3	Cecilia Neer		Elim								
Semi- Final 3	Leanne Steenkamp		Elim								
Semi- Final 3	Tarryn Lamb		Elim								
Semi- Final 3	Tasmia Begbie		Elim								
Semi- Final 2	Kerry Hiles	Elim									
Semi- Final 2	Lauren Matos	Elim									
Semi- Final 2	Lushe Killian	Elim									
Semi- Final 2	Yogin Khandoo	Elim									
Semi- Final 1	Liesl Penniken	Elim									
Semi- Final 1	Malcolm Manuel	Elim									
Semi- Final 1	Rene Hunter	Elim									

- Note: The results of every second semifinal group were announced together.

=== Live show details ===
==== Heat 1 (10 March 2002) ====
Order	Artist	Song (original artists)	Result
1	Brandon October	"She's the One" (Robbie Williams)	Advanced
2	Rene Hunter	"You've Got a Friend" (Carole King)	Eliminated
3	Liesl Penniken	"One Moment in Time" (Whitney Houston)	Eliminated
4	Malcolm Manuel	"I Turn to You" (Christina Aguilera)	Eliminated
5	Melanie Lowe	"Son of a Preacher Man" (Dusty Springfield)	Saved

==== Heat 2 (17 March 2002) ====
Order	Artist	Song (original artists)	Result
1	Lauren Matos	"I Will Survive" (Gloria Gaynor)	Eliminated
2	Yoganathan Khandoo	"We Are the World" (USA for Africa)	Eliminated
3	Kerry Hiles	"Special Star" (Mango Groove)	Eliminated
4	Cindy Bester	"How Do I Live" (LeAnn Rimes)	Advanced
5	Lushé Killian	"Angel" (Sarah McLachlan)	Eliminated

==== Heat 3 (24 March 2002) ====
Order	Artist	Song (original artists)	Result
1	Tarryn Lamb	"It Must Have Been Love" (Roxette)	Eliminated
2	Cecelia Neer	"The Greatest Love of All" (Whitney Houston)	Eliminated
3	Leanne Steenkamp	"From a Distance" (Bette Midler)	Eliminated
4	Tasmia Begbie	"I'm Outta Love" (Anastacia)	Eliminated
5	Nicole Billingham	"Breathe" (Faith Hill)	Advanced

==== Heat 4 (31 March 2002) ====
Order	Artist	Song (original artists)	Result
1	Kim Milner	"Just the Way You Are" (Billy Joel)	Eliminated
2	Rian Swanepoel	"When a Man Loves a Woman" (Percy Sledge)	Advanced
3	Duke Motlanthe	"I Swear" (All-4-One)	Eliminated
4	Philadelphia Shayi	"I Have Nothing" (Whitney Houston)	Eliminated
5	Elena Forbes	"Saving All My Love for You" (Whitney Houston)	Eliminated

==== Heat 5 (7 April 2002) ====
Order	Artist	Song (original artists)	Result
1	David Fourie	"This I Promise You" (NSYNC)	Advanced
2	Laurene Chesling	"Ain't No Sunshine" (Bill Withers)	Eliminated
3	Buli Ngomane	"Where Do Broken Hearts Go" (Whitney Houston)	Eliminated
4	Rebert Roodbol	"I Love the Way You Love Me" (Boyzone)	Eliminated
5	Angelique Campher	"Baby Can I Hold You" (Tracy Chapman)	Eliminated

==== Heat 6 (14 April 2002) ====
Order	Artist	Song (original artists)	Result
1	Nicola Warwick	"Think Twice" (Celine Dion)	Eliminated
2	Bianca Le Grange	"Bohemian Rhapsody" (Queen)	Advanced
3	Francois Mulder	"Can't Take My Eyes Off You" (Andy Williams)	Eliminated
4	Michelle Williamson	"Un-Break My Heart" (Toni Braxton)	Eliminated
5	Vanessa Grebe	"There You'll Be" (Faith Hill)	Eliminated

==== Heat 7 (21 April 2002) ====
Order	Artist	Song (original artists)	Result
1	Ayanda Nhlangothi	"(Something Inside) So Strong" (Labi Siffre)	Advanced
2	Kim August	"Woman in Love" (Barbra Streisand)	Eliminated
3	Darren Green	"Your Song" (Elton John)	Eliminated
4	Lizé Nuttall	"Again" (Janet Jackson)	Eliminated
5	Karlien Husselman	"Walking in Memphis" (Cher)	Eliminated

==== Heat 8 (28 April 2002) ====
Order	Artist	Song (original artists)	Result
1	Dalen Jooste	"How Deep Is Your Love" (Bee Gees)	Eliminated
2	Letoya Makhene	"Declaration of Love" (Celine Dion)	Eliminated
3	Chad Saaiman	"(Everything I Do) I Do It for You" (Bryan Adams)	Eliminated
4	Liana Van Zyl	"I Will Love Again" (Lara Fabian)	Eliminated
5	Heinz Winckler	"Drops of Jupiter (Tell Me)" (Train)	Advanced

==== Heat 9 (5 May 2002) ====
Order	Artist	Song (original artists)	Result
1	Zure Classen	"Eternal Flame" (The Bangles)	Eliminated
2	Nombulelo Mntaka	"Moments Away" (Mango Groove)	Eliminated
3	Monique Steyn	"Fields of Gold" (Sting)	Eliminated
4	Lyndle Kearns	"All the Man That I Need" (Whitney Houston)	Advanced
5	Gugulethu Shezi	"Over and Over" (Puff Johnson)	Eliminated

==== Heat 10 (12 May 2002) ====
Order	Artist	Song (original artists)	Result
1	Boitumelo Masemola	"I Wanna Dance with Somebody (Who Loves Me)" (Whitney Houston)	Eliminated
2	Lauren Laing	"Hero" (Mariah Carey)	Eliminated
3	Mallisan Scholtz	"To Love You More" (Celine Dion)	Eliminated
4	Hybre Africa	"All by Myself" (Celine Dion)	Eliminated
5	Ezra Lingeveldt	"Get Over You" (Brian McKnight)	Advanced

==== Live Show 1 (19 May 2002) ====
Theme: Movie Magic

Artist	Song (original artists)	Result
Lyndle Kearns	"Dancing Queen" (ABBA)	Safe
Bianca Le Grange	"Ben" (Michael Jackson)	Safe
Nicole Billingham	"Take My Breath Away" (Berlin)	Eliminated
Rian Swanepoel	"Against All Odds (Take a Look at Me Now)" (Phil Collins)	Eliminated
Melanie Lowe	"Little Bird" (Annie Lennox)	Bottom five
Ayanda Nhlangothi	"Kiss from a Rose" (Seal)	Safe
David Fourie	"Hungry Eyes" (Eric Carmen)	Eliminated
Cindy Bester	"If I Can't Have You" (Yvonne Elliman)	Bottom four
Heinz Winckler	"I Don't Want to Miss a Thing" (Aerosmith)	Safe
Brandon October	"Let's Stay Together" (Al Green)	Safe
Ezra Lingeveldt	"(Sittin' On) The Dock of the Bay" (Otis Redding)	Safe

==== Live Show 2 (26 May 2002) ====
Theme: My Own Idol

Artist	Song (original artists)	Result
Lyndle Kearns	"Heaven's What I Feel" (Gloria Estefan)	Eliminated
Bianca Le Grange	"Fantasy" (Earth, Wind & Fire)	Safe
Melanie Lowe	"Careless Whisper" (George Michael)	Safe
Ayanda Nhlangothi	"Black Velvet" (Alannah Myles)	Safe
Cindy Bester	"Time After Time" (Cyndi Lauper)	Eliminated
Heinz Winckler	"Higher" (Creed)	Safe
Brandon October	"Hard to Say I'm Sorry" (Chicago)	Safe
Ezra Lingeveldt	"Rosanna" (Toto)	Bottom three

==== Live Show 3 (2 June 2002) ====
Theme: Proudly South African

Artist	Song (original artists)	Result
Bianca Le Grange	"Substitute" (Clout)	Safe
Melanie Lowe	"Acid Rain" (Wendy Oldfield)	Safe
Ayanda Nhlangothi	"Another Country" (Mango Groove)	Eliminated
Heinz Winckler	"Shallow Waters" (Just Jinjer)	Safe
Brandon October	"Hurts So Bad" (Danny K)	Bottom three
Ezra Lingeveldt	"Starlight" (Grannysmith)	Eliminated

==== Live Show 4: Semi-final (9 June 2002) ====
Theme: Judges' Choice

Artist	First song (original artists)	Second song	Result
Bianca Le Grange	"Superwoman" (Karyn White)	"I Don't Want to Wait" (Paula Cole)	Eliminated
Melanie Lowe	"Torn" (Natalie Imbruglia)	"Shackles (Praise You)" (Mary Mary)	Bottom two
Heinz Winckler	"Every Breath You Take" (The Police)	"Soledad" (Westlife)	Safe
Brandon October	"Truly Madly Deeply" (Savage Garden)	"Escape" (Enrique Iglesias)	Safe

==== Live final (16 June 2002) ====
Artist	First song	Second song	Third song	Result
Melanie Lowe	"Little Bird"	"Acid Rain"	"Every Single Thing"	Third place
Heinz Winckler	"Drops of Jupiter (Tell Me)"	"Soledad"	"Once in a Lifetime"	Winner
Brandon October	"She's the One"	"Let's Stay Together"	"Once in a Lifetime"	Runner-up
