= World Idol =

International version of the television show Pop Idol

- Also known as: SuperStar Weltweit (German); SuperStar El Alaam (Arabic)
- Created by: Simon Fuller
- Directed by: Jonathan Bullen
- Presented by: Ant & Dec; Ben Mulroney (CTV version)
- Judges: Simon Cowell; Pete Waterman; Randall Abrahams; Nina De Man; Shona Fraser; Ian Dickson; Elias Rahbani; Zack Werner; Jan Fredrik Karlsen; Henkjan Smits; Kuba Wojewódzki
- Original language: Various
- No. of seasons: 1
- No. of episodes: 2

Production
- Executive producers: John Brunton; Simon Fuller
- Producers: Sue Brophey; Conrad Green; Ken Warwick
- Production locations: The Fountain Studios, London, England; Toronto, Ontario, Canada
- Production companies: 19 Entertainment; Thames Television; Talkback Thames

Original release
- Network: See below
- Release: 25 December 2003 – 1 January 2004

Related
- Various national Idol shows: United Kingdom: Pop Idol; South Africa: Idols; Poland: Idol; United States: American Idol; The Netherlands: Idols; Germany: Deutschland sucht den Superstar; Norway: Idol; Arab States: Super Star; Belgium: Idool; Canada: Canadian Idol; Australia: Australian Idol; Other international versions

World Idol
- Winner: Kurt Nilsen
- Runner-up: Kelly Clarkson

World Idol (Germany: SuperStar Weltweit, Arab World: SuperStar El Alaam) is a one-off international version of the singing competition television show Pop Idol, featuring winners of the various national Idol shows around the world competing against each other.

== Background ==
The performance show was broadcast on Christmas Day 2003, with the results show aired on New Year's Day 2004. It was produced in the United Kingdom at Fountain Studios in London, using the set from the recently completed second series of Pop Idol. After presenting the competitors, viewers from the 11 participating countries were allowed to vote by telephone, but not for the participant from their home country.

All participants sang in English except for Diana Karazon, who sang in Arabic.

British presenters Ant & Dec hosted the show on most English speaking countries, while local presenters hosted for their own country in the local language. Additionally, Canada’s CTV Network used Canadian Idol host Ben Mulroney (with the show on Fox, which used Ant and Dec as hosts, was not simulcast with the CTV feed, to prevent Canadians from calling the American toll-free number to vote for their idol, Ryan Malcolm). Victoria Beckham performed her UK No. 3 hit "Let Your Head Go" during the results interval.

The show was broadcast on 11 television broadcasters worldwide.

== Broadcasters ==
- Germany: RTL Television
- United Kingdom: ITV
- Norway: TV 2
- United States: Fox
- Canada: CTV
- Australia: Network Ten
- Belgium: vtm
- Poland: Polsat
- The Netherlands: RTL 4
- Arab States: Future TV
- South Africa: M-NET

== Results ==
The points were awarded in a similar fashion as the Eurovision Song Contest, i.e. each country awarded a number of points from 1 to 10 to each other country, using each number once. The results were:

Rank	Performer	Country	Points	Song	Original artist
1	Kurt Nilsen	Norway	106	"Beautiful Day"	U2
2	Kelly Clarkson	United States	97	"(You Make Me Feel Like) A Natural Woman"	Aretha Franklin
3	Peter Evrard	Belgium	83	"Lithium"	Nirvana
4	Heinz Winckler	South Africa	80	"I Don't Want to Miss a Thing"	Aerosmith
5	Will Young	United Kingdom	72	"Light My Fire"	The Doors
6	Ryan Malcolm	Canada	62	"He Ain't Heavy, He's My Brother"	The Hollies
7	Guy Sebastian	Australia	56	"What a Wonderful World"	Louis Armstrong
8	Alicja "Alex" Janosz	Poland	55	"I Don't Know How to Love Him"	from Jesus Christ Superstar
9 (tie)	Alexander Klaws	Germany	45	"Maniac"	Michael Sembello
9 (tie)	Diana Karazon	Arab States	45	"Ensani Ma Binsak"	original song
11	Jamai Loman	Netherlands	36	"Sorry Seems to Be the Hardest Word"	Elton John

=== Spokespersons ===
Each country appointed a spokesperson (or a pair of spokespersons) to announce their respective country's points.

- Ant & Dec (United Kingdom)
- Nina De Man (Belgium)
- Andrew G and James Mathison (Australia)
- Ryan Seacrest (United States)
- Rania Kurdi and Ayman Kaissouni (Arab States)
- Maciej Rock (Poland)
- Tooske Ragas (Netherlands)
- Ben Mulroney (Canada)
- Michelle Hunziker and Carsten Spengemann (Germany)
- Thomas Numme and Harald Rønneberg (Norway)
- Marah Louw (South Africa)

== Scoreboard ==
Each country's Idol automatically gained the maximum 12 points. Therefore, the most points an Idol could gain from another country was 10.

Performer	GER	AUS	Pan- Arabia	CAN	NED	RSA	POL	USA	BEL	UK	NOR	Total	Rank
Alexander Klaws (GER)	12	1	10	1	4	2	4	1	7	2	1	45	9
Guy Sebastian (AUS)	2	12	2	6	6	5	5	6	3	6	3	56	7
Diana Karazon (Pan-Arabia)	6	4	12	5	1	1	1	8	1	4	2	45	9
Ryan Malcolm (CAN)	3	5	9	12	5	7	2	4	2	5	8	62	6
Jamai Loman (NED)	1	2	1	2	12	4	3	2	4	1	4	36	11
Heinz Winckler (RSA)	7	8	8	7	2	12	6	9	8	7	6	80	4
Alicja Janosz (POL)	8	3	7	3	3	3	12	3	5	3	5	55	8
Kelly Clarkson (USA)	9	9	5	9	9	8	8	12	9	9	10	97	2
Peter Evrard (BEL)	4	7	6	8	7	6	9	7	12	8	9	83	3
Will Young (UK)	5	6	3	4	8	9	7	5	6	12	7	72	5
Kurt Nilsen (NOR)	10	10	4	10	10	10	10	10	10	10	12	106	1

=== 10 points ===
Below is a summary of all 10 (max) points in the final:

N.	Contestant	Voting nation
9	Norway	Australia, Belgium, Canada, Germany, Netherlands, Poland, South Africa, United Kingdom, United States
1	Germany	Arab States
1	United States	Norway

== Judges ==
The judges of the competition were:

- Randall Abrahams (South Africa)
- Simon Cowell (representing United States, also judge on original UK show)
- Nina De Man (Belgium)
- Ian "Dicko" Dickson (Australia)
- Shona Fraser (Germany)
- Jan Fredrik Karlsen (Norway)
- Elias Rahbani (Lebanon)
- Henkjan Smits (Netherlands)
- Pete Waterman (United Kingdom)
- Zack Werner (Canada)
- Kuba Wojewódzki (Poland)

== Reception ==
Simon Cowell, who judged American Idol as well as the original Pop Idol, was very critical of the format. He went as far as to say he hated it, in that it made the winners from the ten other Idol competitions into losers. Cowell also thought many of the judges were trying to copy his abrasive style (including Canadian Idol judge Zack Werner). Television critics also panned the programme, particularly as the UK phone voting was profit-making, whereas tradition dictates that Christmas specials of such programmes donate profits to charity.

=== Ratings ===
In Canada, the special was watched by 1.9 million viewers. In Poland, World Idol was the highest-rated in its timeslot, 4.5 million viewers, and 28.6 share per cent. In the United States, World Idol was the number-one show of the night among adults from 18–34 but drew a disappointing 6.5 million viewers overall. In Australia, it was the highest-rated show of the night, it had about 2.4 million viewers. In the Netherlands, it was the No. 1 rated show in its timeslot. In the UK, over 4 million tuned in, but the show was beaten by other popular programs that aired Christmas night.

== See also ==
- Idol series
- Pop Idol
- American Idol
- Idols South Africa
- Canadian Idol
- Australian Idol
- Idol (Norway)
- International versions of Idol
