= Idols South Africa season 3 =

Idols South Africa
- Season 3
- Hosted by: Colin Moss
- Judges: Dave Thompson; Mara Louw; Gareth Cliff; Randall Abrahams
- Winner: Karin Kortje
- Runner-up: Gift Gwe
- Finals venue: Gold Reef City

Release
- Original network: M-Net
- Original release: 31 July – 27 November 2005

Season chronology
- ← Previous; Season 2 Next → Season 4

Idols South Africa III was the third season of South African reality interactive talent show based on the British talent show Pop Idol. It was running from August to November 2005. All four judges returned for another season. After one season Letoya Makhene left the show making Colin Moss the solo host, similar to Ryan Seacrest on American Idol.

For the first time the semifinal groups where divided into genders. As there were only six males who made it to the top 24, only one group was male though. This resulted in a top 12 with only two males for a second year in a row. There was no wildcard show held. Instead the judges each chose one contestant who was not voted in the top 12 directly in the group phase.

Viewer outrage ensued following the elimination of Nhlanhla Mwelse after it was revealed that the 4 judges had a 49% leverage to the total weekly votes & that this happened since the start of the semi-finals. Before the series started, it was portrayed that the viewers would account for 100% of the total vote this year compared to the judges' 40% in season 1 & 2.

Karin Kortje, a young mother from Grabouw, Cape Town wowed the audience and judges with her big voice and won the final against Gift Gwe with 62.58% and was also leading throughout the competition by a landside. However Kortje was not so lucky in her personal life after the contest ended as her boyfriend was charged of robbery and murder just months after the show. In difference to the other finalists of her season, Kortje was not invited to take part of the final of the next season.

Twelfth place finalist Jamie-Lee Blokdyk would later return in the sixth season, albeit with the surname "Sexton". Jamie-Lee Sexton wound up placing eighth on that season.

== Finals ==
=== Finalists ===
(ages stated at time of contest)

Contestant	Age	Hometown	Voted Off	Spectacular Theme
Karin Kortje	26	Grabouw, Cape Town	Winner	Grand Finale
Gift Gwe	21	Bishop, Mossel Bay	27 November 2005	Grand Finale
Veronique "Nicky" de Lange	17	Bloemfontein	21 November 2005	Great Singers, Great Songs
Veronique "V" Lalouette	23	Randpark Ridge, Johannesburg	21 November 2005	Great Singers, Great Songs
Nhlanhla Mwelase	22	Springs, Gauteng	14 November 2005	My Idols
Ayanda Mpama	21	Seaview, KwaZulu-Natal	7 November 2005	Judges's Choice
Deidré Visser	17	Centurion, Pretoria	31 October 2005	Music Video Hits
Martelize Van Niekerk	19	Kuilsrivier	31 October 2005	Music Video Hits
Kesha Charlton-Perkins	18	Randburg, Johannesburg	17 October 2005	Viewers' Choice
Pume Zondi	19	Wybank, Pinetown	10 October 2005	Music from the Movies
Bonolo Molosiwa	24	Randpark Ridge, Johannesburg	3 October 2005	#1 Hits from the '90s
Jamie-Lee Blokdyk	19	Magaliesburg	26 September 2005	Millennium Hits

=== Themes ===
- 26 September: Hits 2000
- 3 October: Number 1 Hits
- 10 October: Film Songs
- 17 October: Viewers Choice
- 31 October: Video Hits
- 7 November: Judges Choice
- 14 November: My Idols
- 21 November: Great Songs
- 27 November: Grand Finale

== Elimination Chart ==
Legend
Did Not Perform	Female	Male	Top 24	Wild Card	Top 12	Winner

Safe	Most votes	Bottom 3	Bottom 2	Eliminated

Stage:		Semi				Wild; Card	Finals								
Week:		08/30	09/06	09/12	09/19		09/26	10/03	10/10	10/17	10/31	11/07	11/14	11/21	11/27
Place	Contestant	Result													
1	Karin Kortje		1st				1st	1st	1st	1st	1st	1st	1st	1st	Winner
2	Gift Gwe			2nd			8th	4th	2nd	3rd	4th	3rd	4th	2nd	Runner-Up
3	Veronique de Lange	Elim				Saved	4th	5th	4th	5th	5th	2nd	2nd	3rd	
4	Veronique Lalouette				2nd		7th	6th	7th	2nd	2nd	4th	3rd	4th	
5	Nhlanhla Mwelse			1st			3rd	2nd	8th	4th	3rd	5th	5th		
6	Ayanda Mpama				Elim	Saved	10th	10th	5th	6th	6th	6th			
7	Deidré Visser (van Rooyen)	1st					6th	8th	3rd	7th	7th				
8	Martelize Van Niekerk (Voigt)		2nd				2nd	3rd	6th	8th	8th				
9	Kesha Charlton-Perkins				1st		5th	7th	9th	9th					
10	Pume Zondi	2nd					9th	9th	10th						
11	Bonolo Molosiwa	Elim				Saved	11th	11th							
12	Jamie-Lee Blokdyk		Elim			Saved	12th								
Semi- Final 4	Bianca Bronn				Elim										
Semi- Final 4	Nthabiseng Roro				Elim										
Semi- Final 4	Tumelo Thulare				Elim										
Semi- Final 3	Bjorn Hartnick			Elim											
Semi- Final 3	Callan Maloney			Elim											
Semi- Final 3	Mthawelang Nkozo			Elim											
Semi- Final 3	Roomie Noval			Elim											
Semi- Final 2	Berenice Voigt		Elim												
Semi- Final 2	Jessica Lourenco		Elim												
Semi- Final 2	Karabo Moleke		Elim												
Semi- Final 1	Cecile du Preez	Elim													
Semi- Final 1	Nosipho Zwane	Elim													

=== Live Show Details ===
==== Heat 1 (28 August 2005) ====
Artist	First song (original artists)	Second song	Result
Bonolo Molosiwa	"We Belong Together" (Mariah Carey)	"You Are Everything" (Diana Ross & Marvin Gaye)	Eliminated
Cecile du Preez	"Girl" (Destiny's Child)	"I Say a Little Prayer" (Aretha Franklin)	Eliminated
Deidré Visser	"Father and Son" (Cat Stevens)	"These Words" (Natasha Bedingfield)	Advanced
Nicky de Lange	"Since U Been Gone" (Kelly Clarkson)	"Unchained Melody" (The Righteous Brothers)	Eliminated
Nosipho Zwane	"Destiny" (Malaika)	"Take My Breath Away" (Berlin)	Eliminated
Pume Zondi	"Dance with My Father" (Luther Vandross)	"The Voice Within" (Christina Aguilera)	Advanced

==== Heat 2 (4 September 2005) ====
Artist	First song (original artists)	Second song	Result
Bernice Breedt	"Pieces of Me" (Ashlee Simpson)	"Thank U" (Alanis Morissette)	Eliminated
Jamie-Lee Blokdyk	"Ain't No Sunshine" (Bill Withers)	"Shiver" (Natalie Imbruglia)	Eliminated
Jessica Lourenco	"Sweet Dreams My LA Ex" (Rachel Stevens)	"What a Wonderful World" (Louis Armstrong)	Eliminated
Karabo Moleke	"Don't Tell Me" (Avril Lavigne)	"I Love Music" (Lebo Mathosa)	Eliminated
Karin Kortje	"A Cry, a Smile, a Dance" (Judith Sephuma)	"Ordinary People" (John Legend)	Advanced
Martelize van Niekerk	"Pretty Baby" (Vanessa Carlton)	"Unforgettable" (Nat King Cole)	Advanced

==== Heat 3 (11 September 2005) ====
Artist	First song (original artists)	Second song	Result
Bjorn Hartnick	"Let Me Love You" (Mario)	"Sunday Morning" (Maroon 5)	Eliminated
Callan Maloney	"Evergreen" (Will Young)	"Here Without You" (3 Doors Down)	Eliminated
Gift Gwe	"Holding Back the Years" (Simply Red)	"Señorita" (Justin Timberlake)	Advanced
Mthawelanga Nkonzo	"Daughters" (John Mayer)	"Wrap My Words Around You" (Daniel Bedingfield)	Eliminated
Nhlanhla Mwelse	"Hello" (Lionel Richie)	"This Love" (Maroon 5)	Advanced
Romie Noval	"How Am I Supposed to Live Without You" (Michael Bolton)	"Leave Right Now" (Will Young)	Eliminated

==== Heat 4 (18 September 2005) ====
Artist	First song (original artists)	Second song	Result
Ayanda Mpama	"Ndiredi" (Simphiwe Dana)	"Not in Love" (Enrique Iglesias)	Eliminated
Bianca Bronn	"Everywhere" (Michelle Branch)	"Superstar" (Jamelia)	Eliminated
Kesha Charlton-Perkins	"I Bruise Easily" (Natasha Bedingfield)	"My Prerogative" (Britney Spears)	Advanced
Nthabiseng Roro	"Doo Be Doo" (Freshlyground)	"Let It Be" (The Beatles)	Eliminated
Tumelo Thulare	"Always Be My Baby" (Mariah Carey)	"Only U" (Ashanti)	Eliminated
Veronique Lalouette	"I Believe" (Fantasia Barrino)	"I Don't Want to Wait" (Paula Cole)	Advanced

==== Live Show 1 (25 September 2005) ====
Theme: Millennium Hits

Artist	Song (original artists)	Result
Ayanda Mpama	"Video" (India Arie)	Bottom three
Bonolo Molosiwa	"Amazing" (George Michael)	Bottom two
Deidré Visser	"Behind These Hazel Eyes" (Kelly Clarkson)	Safe
Gift Gwe	"Rhythm Divine" (Enrique Iglesias)	Safe
Jamie-Lee Blokdyk	"Dreams" (Fleetwood Mac)	Eliminated
Karin Kortje	"Don't Know Why" (Norah Jones)	Safe
Kesha Charlton-Perkins	"Bad Day" (Daniel Powter)	Safe
Martelize van Niekerk	"The First Cut Is the Deepest" (Cat Stevens)	Safe
Nhlanhla Mwelse	"Used to Love U" (John Legend)	Safe
Nicky de Lange	"Try" (Nelly Furtado)	Safe
Pume Zondi	"If I Ain't Got You" (Alicia Keys)	Safe
Veronique Lalouette	"All for You" (Janet Jackson)	Safe

==== Live Show 2 (2 October 2005) ====
Theme: #1 Hits from the '90s

Artist	Song (original artists)	Result
Ayanda Mpama	"Angel of Mine" (Monica)	Bottom two
Bonolo Molosiwa	"Take a Bow" (Madonna)	Eliminated
Deidré Visser	"Can't Help Falling in Love" (UB40)	Safe
Gift Gwe	"I Swear" (All-4-One)	Safe
Karin Kortje	"Un-Break My Heart" (Toni Braxton)	Safe
Kesha Charlton-Perkins	"Stay (I Missed You)" (Lisa Loeb)	Safe
Martelize van Niekerk	"Don't Speak" (No Doubt)	Safe
Nhlanhla Mwelse	"I Wanna Be the Only One" (Eternal & BeBe Winans)	Safe
Nicky de Lange	"Crush" (Jennifer Paige)	Safe
Pume Zondi	"You're Still the One" (Shania Twain)	Bottom three
Veronique Lalouette	"Show Me Heaven" (Maria McKee)	Safe

==== Live Show 3 (9 October 2005) ====
Theme: Music from the Movies

Artist	Song (original artists)	Result
Ayanda Mpama	"Over the Rainbow" (Judy Garland)	Safe
Deidré Visser	"Holding Out for a Hero" (Bonnie Tyler)	Safe
Gift Gwe	"Love Is All Around" (Wet Wet Wet)	Safe
Karin Kortje	"Can't Fight the Moonlight" (LeAnn Rimes)	Safe
Kesha Charlton-Perkins	"There You'll Be" (Faith Hill)	Bottom two
Martelize van Niekerk	"All by Myself" (Celine Dion)	Safe
Nhlanhla Mwelse	"How Deep Is Your Love" (Bee Gees)	Bottom three
Nicky de Lange	"Searchin' My Soul" (Vonda Shepard)	Safe
Pume Zondi	"It Must Have Been Love" (Roxette)	Eliminated
Veronique Lalouette	"Crazy" (Patsy Cline)	Safe

==== Live Show 4 (16 October 2005) ====
Theme: Viewers' Choice

Artist	Song (original artists)	Result
Ayanda Mpama	"The First Time Ever I Saw Your Face" (Roberta Flack)	Safe
Deidré Visser	"Bed of Roses" (Bon Jovi)	Bottom three
Gift Gwe	"Give Me the Night" (George Benson)	Safe
Karin Kortje	"(They Long to Be) Close to You" (The Carpenters)	Safe
Kesha Charlton-Perkins	"Reach" (Gloria Estefan)	Eliminated
Martelize van Niekerk	"Let the River Run" (Carly Simon)	Bottom two
Nhlanhla Mwelse	"Signed, Sealed, Delivered I'm Yours" (Stevie Wonder)	Safe
Nicky de Lange	"What's Love Got to Do with It" (Tina Turner)	Safe
Veronique Lalouette	"River Deep – Mountain High" (Tina Turner)	Safe

==== Live Show 5 (23 October 2005) ====
Theme: How It Should Have Been Done

Artist	Song (original artists)	Result
Ayanda Mpama	"Ain't No Mountain High Enough" (Marvin Gaye & Tammi Terrell)	N/A
Deidré Visser	"Strong Enough" (Cher)	N/A
Gift Gwe	"Fever" (Michael Bublé)	N/A
Karin Kortje	"(You Make Me Feel Like) A Natural Woman" (Aretha Franklin)	N/A
Martelize van Niekerk	"Have You Ever Really Loved a Woman?" (Bryan Adams)	N/A
Nhlanhla Mwelse	"Killing Me Softly" (Fugees)	N/A
Nicky de Lange	"My Immortal" (Evanescence)	N/A
Veronique Lalouette	"Angels" (Robbie Williams)	N/A

==== Live Show 6 (30 October 2005) ====
Theme: Music Video Hits

Artist	Song (original artists)	Result
Ayanda Mpama	"Nothing Compares 2 U" (Sinéad O'Connor)	Bottom three
Deidré Visser	"...Baby One More Time" (Britney Spears)	Eliminated
Gift Gwe	"Faith" (George Michael)	Safe
Karin Kortje	"Together Again" (Janet Jackson)	Safe
Martelize van Niekerk	"That Don't Impress Me Much" (Shania Twain)	Eliminated
Nhlanhla Mwelse	"I'll Be Missing You" (Puff Daddy & Faith Evans)	Safe
Nicky de Lange	"Just a Little" (Liberty X)	Safe
Veronique Lalouette	"Beautiful" (Christina Aguilera)	Safe

==== Live Show 7 (6 November 2005) ====
Theme: Judges' Choice

Artist	First song (original artists)	Second song	Result
Ayanda Mpama	"Another Sad Love Song" (Toni Braxton)	"One Day I'll Fly Away" (Randy Crawford)	Eliminated
Gift Gwe	"Uptown Girl" (Westlife)	"Back at One" (Brian McKnight)	Safe
Karin Kortje	"Theme from Mahogany (Do You Know Where You're Going To)" (Diana Ross)	"If I Can't Have You" (Yvonne Elliman)	Safe
Nhlanhla Mwelse	"All Night Long (All Night)" (Lionel Richie)	"Walking Away" (Craig David)	Bottom two
Nicky de Lange	"Underneath Your Clothes" (Shakira)	"Brass in Pocket" (The Pretenders)	Safe
Veronique Lalouette	"Call Me" (Blondie)	"Other Side of the World" (KT Tunstall)	Bottom three

==== Live Show 8 (13 November 2005) ====
Theme: My Idols

Artist	First song (original artists)	Second song	Result
Gift Gwe	"U Remind Me" (Usher)	"End of the Road" (Boyz II Men)	Bottom two
Karin Kortje	"Never Never Never" (Shirley Bassey)	"Never Too Much" (Luther Vandross)	Safe
Nhlanhla Mwelse	"Here and Now" (Luther Vandross)	"Part Time Lover" (Stevie Wonder)	Eliminated
Nicky de Lange	"Foolish Games" (Jewel)	"Small Room" (Karen Zoid)	Safe
Veronique Lalouette	"I Turn to You" (Christina Aguilera)	"Work It Out" (Beyoncé)	Safe

==== Live Show 9: Semi-final (20 November 2005) ====
Theme: Great Singers, Great Songs

Artist	First song (original artists)	Second song	Result
Gift Gwe	"Don't Let the Sun Go Down on Me" (Elton John)	"Stuck on You" (Lionel Richie)	Safe
Karin Kortje	"When I Need You" (Leo Sayer)	"I Have Nothing" (Whitney Houston)	Safe
Nicky de Lange	"It's All Coming Back to Me Now" (Celine Dion)	"How Do I Live" (LeAnn Rimes)	Eliminated
Veronique Lalouette	"Touch Me in the Morning" (Diana Ross)	"Rhythm of the Night" (DeBarge)	Eliminated

==== Live final (27 November 2005) ====
Artist	First song	Second song	Third song	Result
Gift Gwe	"End of the Road"	"Señorita"	"Sometimes a Dream"	Runner-up
Karin Kortje	"(You Make Me Feel Like) A Natural Woman"	"If I Can't Have You"	"I'm So Ready"	Winner
