= Noluthando Meje =

South African actress and singer

- Born: Noluthando Meje Nqayi; 30 October 1986 (age 39); Cape Town, South Africa
- Occupations: Actress, singer, TV presenter
- Years active: 2002–present
- Relatives: Sobantu Nqayi (brother)

Noluthando 'Nolly' Meje Nqayi (born 30 October 1986) is a South African actress and singer. She is best known for her roles in the popular serials Farewell Ella Bella, Swartwater and Silent Witness.

== Personal life ==
Meje was born on 30 October 1986, in Cape Town, South Africa. She completed her education from Camps Bay High School in Cape Town. Her younger brother, Sobantu Nqayi is also a popular actor in South African television and cinema.

== Career ==
In 2002, Meje reached the top 100 of the first season of the M-Net reality competition Idols South Africa. In 2003, she became one of top 12 finalists on the second season, tying for eleventh place. In 2011, she again contested in the seventh season and became a top 16 finalist—this time, resulting in a tenth place finish.

Meje appeared in several television series such as Shooting Stars, Home Affairs and Interrogation Room. She presented the television shows Destination SA and What's Your Story? In December 2008, she replaced Prudence Moabelo as the host of the third season of the youth talk show Keeping it Real. In 2012, she joined the reality dance competition serial Jam Alley Crew vs Crew as a co-host with Slikour. In the same year, she was invited to act in the comedy series Sketch U Later. In late 2012, she replaced Mac Leshomo as the host of the dance reality competition serial Turn It Out.

On 28 April 2014, Meje joined the popular television soapie Isidingo where she played the role of domestic worker Zukisa Kondile. In 2015, she became the host of the first season of the reality competition The Sing-Off SA. In 2018, she appeared in the film Farewell Ella Bella, in the role of Khanyisa.

== Filmography ==
Year	Film	Role	Genre	Ref.
1997	Kap der guten Hoffnung	Mabel	TV series	
2002	Stokvel	Kuki	TV series	
2010	Silent Witness	Cynthia Tghilolo	TV series	
2014	Swartwater	Faith Malinga	TV series	
2015	De(Con)Struction of Love		Short film	
2015	Promise	Mbali	Short film	
2018	Farewell Ella Bella	Khanyisa	Film	
