= Idols South Africa =

Television series

- Created by: Simon Fuller
- Based on: Pop Idol created by Simon Fuller
- Directed by: Mahle Buyelekhaya
- Presented by: ProVerb (2010–23); Liezl van der Westhuizen (2009–10); Colin Moss (2003–07); Letoya Makhene (2003); Candy Litchfield (2002); Sami Sabiti (2002); Matt Stewardson (2002)
- Judges: Thembi Seete (2022–23); JR (2022–23); Somizi Mhlongo (2015–23); Randall Abrahams (2002–21); Unathi Nkayi (2011–21); Gareth Cliff (2003–16); Mara Louw (2003–10); Dave Thompson (2002–09); Marcus Brewster (2002); Penny Lebyane (2002)
- Country of origin: South Africa
- Original language: South African languages
- No. of seasons: 19
- No. of episodes: 300+

Production
- Executive producers: ProVerb; Gavin Wratten
- Running time: 2 hours (incl. commercials)
- Production companies: MultiChoice; FremantleMedia; 19 Television

Original release
- Network: M-Net; Mzansi Magic
- Release: 10 March 2002 – 4 November 2023

Idols is a television show on the South African network Mzansi Magic, and previously on M-Net, based on the popular British show Pop Idol. The show was a contest to determine the best young singer in South Africa.

The general format of the show is that thousands of hopeful performers from across South Africa auditioned in front of the judges. They were narrowed down to approximately 100 to enter the theatre rounds. They performed in group and solo rounds until 16 finalists are chosen by the judges (usually 8 males and 8 females). From these, the top 10 are selected, then each week, viewers had several hours following the broadcast of the previous episode to vote by phone, SMS or online for their favourite contestant. The contestant(s) with the fewest votes was sent home each week.

It was presented by Candy Litchfield and Matthew Stewardson in the first season. Halfway through the season, Stewardson was replaced by Sami Sabiti. After Colin Moss and Letoya Makhene co-hosted the second season, Moss went solo for the third and fourth seasons. Liezl van der Westhuizen became the host in the fifth season, and was sidekicked by ProVerb in the sixth season who hosted the semi-final rounds. ProVerb became the sole presenter from the seventh season until the nineteenth season.

Randall Abrahams, Dave Thompson, Marcus Brewster and Penny Lebyane were the judges in the first season. Judges provide critiques of each contestant's performance. Brewster and Lebyane did not return for the second season and were replaced by Mara Louw-Thomson and Gareth Cliff.Unathi Nkayi replaced Louw-Thomson in the seventh season. Somizi Mhlongo was added to the judging panel in the eleventh season. Cliff left the show after the twelfth season. After several seasons as judges, Abrahams and Nkayi did return for the eighteenth season. In February 2022, Thembi Seete and JR replaced the two until the nineteenth season.

In February 2023, it was announced that the nineteenth season would be the last season of the competition.

In 2006, the show had a spin-off called Afrikaanse Idols on sister channel Kyknet, where exactly the same format was executed. However, the entire programme was in Afrikaans as well as the songs that were performed. There was only one season due to low ratings. The judges were Mynie Grové, Deon Maas and Taliep Petersen, while the presenter was Sean Paul

== Series overview ==
=== English series ===
Colour key

Female contestant
Male contestant
Joint winners

Season	Premiere	Finale	Judges				Presenters			Winner	Runner-up	Third place
1	10 March 2002	17 June 2002	Randall Abrahams	Marcus Brewster	Penny Lebyane	Dave Thompson	Candy Litchfield	Sami Sabitiin	Matthew Stewardson	Heinz Winckler	Brendon October	Melanie Lowe
2	22 June 2003	20 September 2003	Randall Abrahams	Mara Louw	Gareth Cliff	Dave Thompson	Colin Moss	Letoya Makhene		Anke Pietrangeli	Poseletso Sejosingo	Jacques Terre'Blanche
3	31 July 2005	27 November 2005	Randall Abrahams	Mara Louw	Gareth Cliff	Dave Thompson	Colin Moss			Karin Kortje	Gift Gwe	Veronique de Lange
4	19 August 2007	9 December 2007	Randall Abrahams	Mara Louw	Gareth Cliff	Dave Thompson	Colin Moss			Jody Williams	Andriëtte Norman	Munro du Toit
5	1 February 2009	10 May 2009	Randall Abrahams	Mara Louw	Gareth Cliff	Dave Thompson	Liezl van der Westhuizen			Jason Hartman / Sasha-Lee Davids	–	Graeme Watkins
6	18 July 2010	2 November 2010	Randall Abrahams	Mara Louw	Gareth Cliff		Liezl van der Westhuizen	ProVerb		Elvis Blue	Lloyd Cele	Sindi Nene
7	5 June 2011	4 October 2011	Randall Abrahams	Unathi Nkayi	Gareth Cliff			ProVerb		Dave van Vuuren	Mark Haze	Crushanda Forbes
8	3 June 2012	2 October 2012	Randall Abrahams	Unathi Nkayi	Gareth Cliff			ProVerb		Khaya Mthethwa	Melissa Allison	Monde Msutwana
9	28 July 2013	24 November 2013	Randall Abrahams	Unathi Nkayi	Gareth Cliff			ProVerb		Musa Sukwene	Brenden Ledwaba	Sonke Mazibuko
10	13 July 2014	23 November 2014	Randall Abrahams	Unathi Nkayi	Gareth Cliff			ProVerb		Vincent Bones	Bongi Silinda	Lize Mynhardt
11	12 July 2015	22 November 2015	Randall Abrahams	Unathi Nkayi	Gareth Cliff	Somizi Mhlongo		ProVerb		Karabo Mogane	Mmatema Moremi	Rhema Varrie
12	17 July 2016	27 November 2016	Randall Abrahams	Unathi Nkayi	Gareth Cliff	Somizi Mhlongo		ProVerb		Noma Khumalo	Thami Shobede	Tebogo Louw
13	9 July 2017	19 November 2017	Randall Abrahams	Unathi Nkayi		Somizi Mhlongo		ProVerb		Paxton Fielies	Mthokozisi Ndaba	Botlhale Phora
14	8 July 2018	18 November 2018	Randall Abrahams	Unathi Nkayi		Somizi Mhlongo		ProVerb		Yanga Sobetwa	Thato Makape	Thando Mngomezulu
15	7 July 2019	17 November 2019	Randall Abrahams	Unathi Nkayi		Somizi Mhlongo		ProVerb		Luyolo Yiba	Sneziey Msomi	Micayla Oelofse
16	2 August 2020	13 December 2020	Randall Abrahams	Unathi Nkayi		Somizi Mhlongo		ProVerb		Zama Khumalo	Mr Music	Brandon Dhludhlu
17	11 July 2021	21 November 2021	Randall Abrahams	Unathi Nkayi		Somizi Mhlongo		ProVerb		Berry Trytsman	Karabo Mathe	S'22kile Langa
18	17 July 2022	13 November 2022	Thembi Seete	JR		Somizi Mhlongo		ProVerb		Thapelo Molomo	Nozi Sibiya	Mpilwenhle Mokopu
19	8 July 2023	4 November 2023	Thembi Seete	JR		Somizi Mhlongo		ProVerb		Thabo Ndlovu	Princess MacDonald	Faith Nakana

=== Afrikaans series ===
Colour key

Female contestant
Male contestant

Season	Premiere	Finale	Judges			Presenters	Winner	Runner-up	Third place
1	28 May 2006	28 August 2006	Taliep Petersen	Deon Maas	Mynie Grové	Sean Else	Dewald Louw	Willem Botha	Alzonia Titus

== Season synopsis ==
=== Season 1 ===
The first season of South African Idols started in March 2002. Auditions were held prior in January. After Poland, it was the second international spin-off of the original Pop Idol series that went on air. However, the South African show did last shorter than the Polish version and therefore Heinz Winckler became the second Idol winner worldwide on 17 June 2002. He triumphed over Brandon October who came second and Melanie Lowe who finished third.

=== Season 2 ===
The second season ran from June to October 2003 and was won by then 20-year-old Anke Pietrangeli who was given the nickname The Kimberlite by the viewers during the show.

Half of the judging panel were replaced as were the two hosts, with Colin Moss and Letoya Makhene now hosting. It was also the first time worldwide on an Idol show that only two male singers managed to advance to the top 12.

=== Season 3 ===
The third season aired in the second half of 2005 with an unchanged judging panel and Colin Moss as the only host of the show. The Grand Final took place at Gold Reef City, Johannesburg on 27 November 2005 between Karin Kortje and Gift Gwe. Each contestant sang a favourite song chosen by them, a favourite song chosen by the judges, and a brand new single. After a record number of votes cast, Karin Kortje was crowned as the 2005 Idol with 62.58% of the votes.

=== Afrikaans season ===
In 2006, the English format of Idols took a break to make room for the Afrikaans version. The Afrikaans Idols season represented a unique change in Idols format on a global scale by replacing all previous judges and hosts, moving networks (M-Net to sister station KykNet) and therefore changing the lingua franca of the show from English to Afrikaans as KykNET is solely an Afrikaans network.

=== Season 4 ===
On 13 April 2007, M-Net announced the series would return to their network for a fourth season in English. The initial auditions were completed on 6 August with the judging and public vote stages due to start on 19 August. The results from each show display a merge of the judges (49%) and audience (51%) vote. Jody Williams, a 17-year-old from Cape Town, emerged as the eventual winner. Her best performances included moving ballads such as "Greatest Reward" by Celine Dion and "Dance with my Father" by Luther Vandross. However, she proved her versatility and impressed the judges with excellent renditions of more up-tempo songs such as "Dance with Somebody" by Whitney Houston and "Ain't no Other Man" by Christina Aguilera. Her first single, which she and fellow finalist, Andriëtte Norman, performed at the finale, was called "Love is All Around" and was sold out the day after the finale.

=== Season 5 ===
M-Net announced a fifth season of South African Idols which premiered on Sunday, 1 February 2009, with a summer vibe and new rules.

In addition to upping the heat of the selection process the strict a capella rule was abandoned. Instead, auditioners were allowed to bring instruments to the casting. The judges did not seem too pleased with the instruments, especially guitars which were very rarely played in tune.

On the official finale, Sasha-Lee Davids was announced the winner, with 52.77% of the votes. Four days later, Idols announced that there had been problems with the voteline, and some of the votes that were sent before the cut-off time were not counted. The investigation hit the front page of the Times on 8 May 2009 and later in the day it was announced on the Idols website that the recount had shown that Jason Hartman had received 200,000 more votes than Sasha-Lee Davids(of 2.3 million total votes in the finale (recount)). After discussion between M-Net and FremantleMedia (the format owners), Jason Hartman and Sasha-Lee Davids were declared winners. They both received identical full prizes.

=== Season 6 ===
Despite the previous seasons voting fiasco in the finale, M-Net announced a sixth season of South African Idols which premiered on 18 July 2010. Idols judge Dave Thompson did not return to the panel this season. During the auditions, which started in April, he was replaced with guest judges from the South African music industry, similar to the American Idol season 9 audition stages.

For the first time since the second season, the jury has no impact on the outcome which now reflected a 100% viewer's verdict. On 2 November 2010, 30-year-old Elvis Blue from George in the Western Cape was declared the winner.

=== Season 7 ===
It was announced during the sixth season finale that the show had been renewed for a seventh season in 2011. Auditions took place in February and March 2011. On 20 January 2011, it was announced that Mara Louw would not return to the judging panel for the seventh season. The decision came after she was reprimanded for drinking a mix of painkillers and alcohol before a show. She was also involved in a racism scandal after she said the show should be moved to SABC3 so that a black person could win Idols, as many black people did not have DStv and could not send hundreds of SMSes to vote for their favourites. She was replaced by media personality and singer-songwriter Unathi Nkayi. On 4 October 2011, Dave Van Vuuren from Johannesburg in Gauteng was declared the winner.

=== Season 8 ===
It was announced on 9 January 2012 that the show had been renewed for an eighth season in 2012. Nationwide auditions took place from February 2012. The eighth season of Idols was shown on M-Net and Mzansi Magic on DStv simultaneously. On 2 October 2012, Khaya Mthethwa from Durban in KwaZulu-Natal was declared the winner, becoming the first black contestant in the show's history to win.

=== Season 9 ===
It was announced on 11 January 2013 that the show had been renewed for a ninth season in 2013. Nationwide auditions took place from February 2013. The ninth season of Idols was broadcast simultaneously on M-Net and Mzansi Magic on DStv. The season was won by Musa Sukwene and the runner-up was Brenden Ledwaba. This was the first time in South African Idol history that the top three contestants were all male.

=== Season 10 ===
Broadcasting of the tenth season of Idols commenced on M-Net on 13 July 2014 and the finale was broadcast on M-Net and Mzansi Magic. Vincent Bones' inspiring life story of being a street kid at the age of 12 after his mother died touched the hearts of many as he emerged as the tenth South African Idols winner on 23 November 2014. Runner-up was Bongiwe Silinda, the second black woman in South African Idols history to go as far as the finale.

=== Season 11 ===
The eleventh season of Idols South Africa began broadcasting on 12 July 2015. Somizi Mhlongo was added to the judging panel, and the duration of each episode was increased to two hours. Karabo Mogane won the season and Mmatema Moremi was the runner-up.

=== Season 12 ===
The twelfth season began broadcasting in July 2016 and ended on 27 November 2016. The top two were Noma Khumalo and second-timer Thami Shobede, where Noma won. Unfortunately, Thami passed away three years later.

=== Season 13 ===
The thirteenth season began to broadcast on 9 July 2017 and final was on 19 November 2017. The season ended with Paxton Fielies being crowned the winner, while the runner-up was Mthokozisi Ndaba.

=== Season 14 ===
The fourteenth season of Idols began to broadcast on 8 July 2018 and finale was held on 18 November 2018, naming the winner 17-year-old Yanga Sobetwa. The runner-up was Thato Makape.

=== Season 15 ===
The fifteenth season premiered on 7 July 2019, 17:30 CAT on the Mzansi Magic television network. On 17 November 2019, just before 19:00 CAT, the show's presenter and producer, ProVerb announced that the fifteenth season winner was 24-year-old Luyolo Yiba.

=== Season 16 ===
The sixteenth season of Idols started on 2 August 2020 and concluded on 13 December 2020. The season's winner was 18-year-old Zama Khumalo, while the runner-up was Mr Music.

=== Season 17 ===
The seventeenth season of Idols started on 11 July 2021 and concluded on 21 November 2021. The winner was 31-year-old singer Berenike "Berry" Trytsman, while the runner-up was Karabo Mathe. It was the first time in South African Idols history that the top three contestants were all female.

Judge Somizi Mhlongo only appeared in the pre-recorded episodes to deal with personal issues. He was replaced by a guest judge for all the live episodes. This was the last season for resident judges Unathi Nkayi and Randall Abrahams.

=== Season 18 ===
The eighteenth season of Idols premiered on 17 July 2022 and ended on 13 November 2022 on Mzansi Magic. The season was won by Thapelo Molomo, while Nozi Sibiya was the runner-up.

The Top 16 round was replaced with a Top 12 one. It was the first season without Randall Abrahams as a judge since the inception of the Idols South Africa franchise. The seventeenth season was also the last for Unathi Nkayi as judge after it was announced at the end of that season that the two would not be returning. Two new judges replaced them, Thembi Seete and JR.

=== Season 19 ===
The nineteenth and final season of Idols premiered on 8 July 2023 and ended on 4 November 2023 on Mzansi Magic and Mzansi Wethu. The season was won by Thabo Ndlovu, while Princess MacDonald was the runner-up.

== Controversy ==
The show has gone through a lot of controversies since its first broadcast.

In the first season, presenter Matthew Stewardson was replaced halfway through the show by Sami Sabiti. Soon after that, Stewardson checked himself into a drug rehabilitation centre.

The outcome of Idols I was followed by a row of complaints about Heinz Winckler's victory, as many viewers saw the result as injustice and racially biased.

Third season winner Karin Kortje was not so lucky in her personal life as her boyfriend was charged with robbery and murder just months after the show. Unlike other finalists of her season, Kortje was not invited to take part in the final of the following season.

In the final showdown of the fifth season, there were problems with the voteline. This resulted in some of the votes that were sent before the cut-off time not being counted. The investigation hit the front page of The Times on 8 May 2009, and later in the day it was announced on the official Idols website that the recount showed that Jason Hartman had received 200,000 more votes than Sasha-Lee Davids, who was originally declared as the winner in the grand finale, with 52.77% of the votes. Four days later, Idols announced that, after discussions between M-Net and FremantleMedia (the format owners), Hartman and Davids were declared joint winners. They both received identical full prizes. This was the first time a win was shared on an Idols show.

In the fifteenth season, top five contestant, Viggy Qwabe, withdrew from the competition shortly after her identical twin-sister, Virginia, failed to advance to the top five round. The twins' father alleged that the voting process was rigged. Reportedly, police had to be called to the scene backstage to intervene after some of the twins' family and fans threatened violence. The girls also didn't return for the finale as is usually done by the top ten contestants of each season.

The seventeenth season saw judge Somizi Mhlongo being asked to step-aside by the show to deal with domestic abuse allegations against him by his husband Mohale Motaung. As a result, he only appeared in the first few episodes that were pre-recorded by the time the allegations surfaced. There was subsequently a ratings plunge for the show following his departure.
