= Bed of Roses (1996 film) =

- Theatrical release poster
- Directed by: Michael Goldenberg
- Written by: Michael Goldenberg
- Produced by: Allan Mindel; Denise Shaw
- Starring: Christian Slater; Mary Stuart Masterson; Pamela Segall; Josh Brolin
- Cinematography: Adam Kimmel
- Edited by: Jane Kurson
- Music by: Michael Convertino
- Production companies: New Line Cinema; Juno Pix
- Distributed by: New Line Cinema
- Release date: January 26, 1996
- Running time: 87 minutes
- Country: United States
- Language: English
- Box office: $27.3 million

Bed of Roses is a 1996 American romantic drama film written and directed by Michael Goldenberg and starring Christian Slater and Mary Stuart Masterson.

== Plot ==
Lisa Walker (Mary Stuart Masterson) is a business executive who has gotten used to being alone but doesn't like it very much. She was abandoned by her birth parents and then spent most of her childhood being raised by Stanley (S.A. Griffin), a foster father who never really loved Lisa after her adopted mother died.

One morning after finishing a business meeting, Lisa gets word that Stanley has died. Alone in her apartment, after attempting to feed her now dead pet fish, she breaks down and cries uncontrollably. The next day at work, Lisa gets an unexpected delivery of flowers from a secret admirer. Puzzled, she presses the delivery man for information on who might have sent her the flowers. He says the sender wants to remain anonymous. Lisa asks her friends for names and visits the flower shop to no avail.

After getting to know each other better, the florist confesses that he sent them. Lewis (Christian Slater) runs a flower shop and often takes long walks through the neighborhood at night, trying to lose memories of his deceased wife and child. He saw Lisa crying in her window and hoped the roses would cheer her up. Before long, Lisa and Lewis begin dating but each has emotional issues to resolve before their story can have a happy ending.

== Cast ==
- Christian Slater as Lewis Farrell
- Mary Stuart Masterson as Lisa Walker
- Pamela Adlon as Kim (Credited as Pamela Segall)
- Josh Brolin as Danny
- Ally Walker as Wendy
- Kenneth Cranham as Simon
- Debra Monk as Mrs. Farrell
- Mary Alice as Alice
- Brian Tarantina as Randy
- Anne Pitoniak as Grandma Jean
- S.A. Griffin as Stanley
- Desiree Casado as Amelia
- Nick Tate as Bayard

== Reception ==
Rotten Tomatoes gives the film a 19% rating based on reviews from 16 critics.

Roger Ebert gave it 2 stars out of 4, calling the main characters "sad sacks." Conversely, his on-screen partner Gene Siskel conceded that the film, while a bit odd, contained some touching moments. He awarded the film three stars.

Jack Mathews of the Los Angeles Times was critical of the too predictable plot but praised the performances.

== Soundtrack ==
No.	Title	Music	Length
1.	"Boom"	Michael Convertino	3:57
2.	"Tuesday"	Michael Convertino	3:03
3.	"Dream"	Michael Convertino	2:40
4.	"Independent Love Song"	Scarlet	3:50
5.	"Too Much Perfection"	Michael Convertino	1:45
6.	"I Looked Up"	Michael Convertino	2:57
7.	"Ice Cream"	Sarah McLachlan	2:46
8.	"In Winter"	Michael Convertino	1:51
9.	"Amelia and the King of Plants"	Michael Convertino	3:09
10.	"Family"	Michael Convertino	2:14
11.	"Wait"	Michael Convertino	1:58
12.	"Killing Time"	Daniel O'Brien	3:33
13.	"Nervous Heart"	The Borrowers	3:24
14.	"Snow Fell On Walter"	Michael Convertino	2:29
Total length:			36:16
