= Anke Pietrangeli =

South African singer (born 1982)

Anke Pietrangeli (born 16 November 1982) is a South African singer. She was the winner of the second season of popular talent search series Idols in South Africa in 2003. Like her predecessor, Heinz Winckler, Anke also had a nickname: The Kimberley Diamond. Pietrangeli was convinced to enter by her brother, Sven, who was always certain that his sister would be a star.

== Songs performed on Idols ==
Top 32: Unforgettable by Nat King Cole
Top 12: Don't Know Why by Norah Jones
Top 10 :Moments Away by Mango Groove
Top 9: Independent Love Song by Scarlet
Top 7: It Had To Be You by Harry Connick, Jr.
Top 6: Here I Am by Bryan Adams
Top 5: Yesterday by The Beatles
Top 5: "From Me to You" by The Beatles
Top 5: Cry by Faith Hill
Top 5: There You'll Be by Faith Hill
Top 3: Like A Prayer by Madonna
Top 3: True Colors by Cyndi Lauper
Top 3: I Don't Wanna Miss A Thing by Aerosmith
Finale: Independent Love Song by Scarlet
Finale: Silver Lining
Finale: Unforgettable by Nat King Cole

== Discography ==
Albums

- Idols
- By Heart (March 2004)
- Limbo (July 2006)
- Tribute to the Great Female Vocalists (November 2008)

Singles

- Silver Lining
- By Heart
- We're Unbreakable
- My Radio
- Stay If You Will
