= Forever and a Day =

Forever and a Day may refer to:

== Albums ==
- Forever and a Day, album by Jeff & Sheri Easter 2003
- Forever and a Day (album), a 2006 album by Karin Kortje; also its title track
- Forever and a Day, a 2010 album by the Kruger Brothers; also its title track

== Songs ==
- "Forever and a Day", a song from the 1992 album Ignition by The Offspring
- "Forever and a Day", a 1994 single by Brothers in Rhythm
- "Forever and a Day", a song from the 1996 album Used Heart for Sale by Gary Allan
- "Forever and a Day", a song from the 2001 album Music of the Spheres by Ian Brown
- "Forever and a Day", a 2003 single by State One, inspired by the BBC One Rhythm & Movement "Festival" ident.
- "Forever and a Day", a song from the 2004 eponymous album by The Dissociatives
- "Forever and a Day", a 2004 single by Private Line
- "Forever and a Day", a song from the 2005 album Death for Life by Death by Stereo
- "Forever and a Day", a song from the 2008 album Down to Earth by Jem
- "Forever and a Day", a song from the 2009 album Just Go by Lionel Richie
- "Forever and a Day (Always)", a song from the 2009 album Lullaby by Jewel
- "Forever and a Day" (Kelly Rowland song), a 2010 single from the 2011 album Here I Am
- "Forever and a Day", a song from the 2024 album Fireworks & Rollerblades by Benson Boone

== Other uses ==
- Forever and a Day (1943 film), an American drama film
- Forever and a Day (2011 film), a Filipino romance film
- Forever and a Day (novel), 2018 James Bond novel by Anthony Horowitz
- Forever and a Day (soap opera), 2020-present, an American serialized audio drama

== See also ==
- Forever & One Day, an album and a song by Mr. President
- Forever in a Day, a 2009 album by the Day26
- "Forever in a Day", a 1999 episode of the third season of Stargate SG-1 television series
