= Willem Botha =

South African singer, actor and music producer

- Born: 17 April 1987 (age 39)
- Education: University of Stellenbosch
- Occupations: singer, actor and music producer

Willem Botha (born 17 April 1987) is a South African singer, actor and music producer from Riversdale, Western Cape. He was the runner-up of Afrikaanse Idols reality music programme and predominantly performs Afrikaans language songs.

== Early career ==
Botha studied drama at the University of Stellenbosch in 2006. However he delayed his studies to take part in Afrikaanse Idols. He finished as the runner up of the programme but received a recording contract from Sony and moved to Johannesburg. Later in 2006, he released his debut album "Kô Ma Hier".

=== Eurovision ===
Botha has had an association with the Eurovision Song Contest since Afrikaanse Idols. In 2009, he released "Hi Hi Ho", also promoted as "Hi Hi Ho (Bokke Weergawe)" (English: "Hi Hi Ho (Springbok version)") as an Afrikaans adaptation of the Latvian 2008 Eurovision Song Contest entry "Wolves of the Sea" by Pirates of the Sea, with the lyrics being adapted to support the South Africa national rugby union team (colloquially known as the Springboks). Later that year he released his second album titled "Sê My Nou" which was nominated for the best Afrikaans Sokkie Dans album at the 16th South African Music Awards. In 2013, he helped to produce the 2013 Belarusian Eurovision entry "Solayoh" and was part of the performance act as one of Alyona Lanskaya's backing singers. This made him the first South African to perform at Eurovision. (Note: With sole South African nationality)

== Acting ==
Botha made his acting debut in the Afrikaans language film Liefling, Die Movie in 2010. In 2013, he played his first television acting role in Donkerland.

== Discography ==
- Kô Ma Hier (2007)
- Sê My Nou (2009)
- My Stem is Joune (2012)
- Soen & Vergeet (2017)
