= Forever and a Day (album) =

Studio album by Karin Kortje
- Released: 13 November 2006
- Recorded: 2006
- Genre: Rock\Pop
- Label: Giant Steps
- Producer: Johan Laas, Dave Thompson

Forever and a Day is the debut album of Idols winner Karin Kortje.

== Track listing ==
1. "Forever and a Day"
2. "You Don't Know"
3. "Everything I Do"
4. "How I Wish"
5. "I'm Better With You"
6. "I'll Be Gone"
7. "Stealing"
8. "Some People"
9. "Nothing Left But The Music"
10. "Never Never Never"
11. "If I Can't Have You"
12. "Back in Your Arms"
13. "I'm So Ready"
