= Idols South Africa season 9 =

Season of television series

Idols South Africa
- Season 9
- Hosted by: ProVerb
- Judges: Randall Abrahams; Unathi Msengana; Gareth Cliff
- Winner: Musa Sukwene
- Runner-up: Brenden Ledwaba

Release
- Original network: M-Net, M-Net HD & Mzansi Magic
- Original release: 28 July – 24 November 2013

Season chronology
- ← Previous; Season 8 Next → Season 10

Idols South Africa IX is the ninth season of South African reality interactive talent show based on the British talent show Pop Idol.

After the auditions, call backs were held in Sun City for the golden ticket holders.

== Regional auditions ==
Auditions began in February 2013, and were held in the following cities:

Episode air date	Audition city	Audition date	Audition venue	Tickets to Sun City
28 July 2013	Cape Town, Western Cape	2 February 2013	Grandwest Arena	19
11 August 2013	Soweto, Gauteng	16 February 2013	Soweto Theatre	39 (with Johannesburg)
4 August 2013	Durban, Kwazulu Natal	2 March 2013	The Playhouse Company (Durban)|The Playhouse Company	21
11 August 2013	Johannesburg, Gauteng	23 March 2013	Sandton Convention Centre	39 (with Soweto)
			Total countrywide	79

== Top 16 Show ==
Top 8 Males

15 September 2013

	Contestant	Age	Hometown	Occupation	Song	Result
1	Benjamin Tainton	19	Cape Town	Apprentice Farrier	"Wake Me Up" (Avicii)	Advanced
2	Brenden Ledwaba	19	Mpumalanga	Student	"Stay" (Rihanna)	Advanced
3	Innocent Mabushe	27	Limpopo	Singer	"Get Lucky" (Daft Punk)	Advanced
4	Jono Johansen	16	Durban	Student	"Millionaire" (Kelis)	Eliminated
5	Lee-Ron Malgas	18	Cape Town	Student	"Harriet Jones" (Eric Benét)	Eliminated
6	Sonke Mazibuko	21	Soweto	Singer	"Diamonds" (Rihanna)	Advanced
7	Philip Dube	20	Johannesburg	Student	"Believe in Me" (Bonnie Tyler)	Eliminated
8	Musa Sukwene	26	Mpumalanga	Musician	"Don't Judge Me" (Chris Brown)	Advanced

Top 8 Females

22 September 2013

	Contestant	Age	Hometown	Occupation	Song	Result
1	Carle van Deventer	30	Johannesburg	Singer	"Brave" (Sara Bareilles)	Eliminated
2	Tauna Collier	26	Cape Town	Singer	"One Way or Another (Teenage Kicks)" (One Direction)	Eliminated
3	Tumi Lesejane	21	Midrand	Student	"Beneath Your Beautiful" (Labrinth & Emeli Sandé)	Advanced
4	Christina Williams	21	Port Elizabeth	Singer	"Clown" (Emeli Sandé)	Advanced
5	Amy Jones	20	Cape Town	Student	"Brand New Me" (Alicia Keys)	Eliminated
6	Bunny Majaja	26	Johannesburg	Musician	"Let Her Go" (Passenger)	Advanced
7	Zoe Zana	19	Cape Town	Student	"Lose to Win" (Fantasia Barrino)	Advanced
8	Crystalene Nair	24	Durban	Teacher and Singer	"Come & Get It" (Selena Gomez)	Advanced

== Top 10 ==
The top ten performed on 29 September 2013.

Order	Contestant	Song	Result
1	Brenden Ledwaba	"You Sexy Thing" (Hot Chocolate)	Advanced
2	Crystalene Nair	"Because You Loved Me" (Celine Dion)	Advanced
3	Innocent Mabushe	"The Lady in Red" (Chris de Burgh)	Advanced
4	Benjamin Tainton	"Everything I Do (I Do It For You)" (Bryan Adams)	Advanced
5	Zoe Zana	Never Gonna Give You Up (Rick Astley)	Bottom Three
6	Sonke Mazibuko	"All Out of Love" (Air Supply)	Advanced
7	Tumi Lesejane	"Take My Breath Away" (Berlin)	Eliminated
8	Bunny Majaja	"You’re the First, the Last, My Everything" (Barry White)	Advanced
9	Musa Sukwene	"Sexual Healing" (Marvin Gaye)	Advanced
10	Christina Williams	"Walking on Sunshine" (Katrina and the Waves)	Bottom Three

== Top 9 ==
The top nine performed on 6 October 2013.

Order	Contestant	Song	Result
1	Crystalene Nair	"Stronger (What Doesn't Kill You)" (Kelly Clarkson)	Advanced
2	Musa Sukwene	"Ndiyagodola" (Ringo Madlingozi)	Advanced
3	Benjamin Tainton	"The Scientist" (Coldplay)	Advanced
4	Brenden Ledwaba	"Her Heart" (Anthony Hamilton)	Advanced
5	Sonke Mazibuko	"Jikizinto" (Zonke)	Advanced
6	Christina Williams	"Try" (Pink)	Bottom Three
7	Innocent Mabushe	"Paradise" (Coldplay)	Advanced
8	Zoe Zana	"Love the Way You Lie" (Rihanna)	Bottom Three
9	Bunny Majaja	"Proud Mary" (Tina Turner)	Advanced

== Top 8 ==
The top eight performed on 13 October 2013.

Order	Contestant	Song	Result
1	Zoe Zana	"Lady Marmalade" (Christina Aguilera, Pink, Lil' Kim & Mýa)	Advanced
2	Innocent Mabushe	"Two Hearts" (Phil Collins)	Eliminated
3	Sonke Mazibuko	"Go the Distance" (Michael Bolton)	Advanced
4	Crystalene Nair	"Exhale (Shoop Shoop)" (Whitney Houston)	Advanced
5	Brenden Ledwaba	"This Woman's Work" (Kate Bush)	Advanced
6	Musa Sukwene	"Win" (Brian McKnight)	Advanced
7	Bunny Majaja	"Kiss from a Rose" (Seal)	Bottom Three
8	Christina Williams	"Skyfall" (Adele)	Bottom Three

== Top 7 ==
The top seven performed on 20 October 2013.

Order	Contestant	Song	Result
1	Crystalene Nair	"(You Make Me Feel Like) A Natural Woman" (Aretha Franklin)	Bottom Three
2	Musa Sukwene	"Pass Me Over" (Anthony Hamilton)	Advanced
3	Bunny Majaja	"Let It Be" (The Beatles)	Bottom Three
4	Sonke Mazibuko	"Many Rivers to Cross" (Jimmy Cliff)	Advanced
5	Brenden Ledwaba	"You Raise Me Up" (Secret Garden)	Advanced
6	Christina Williams	"Fallin'" (Alicia Keys)	Eliminated
7	Zoe Zana	"Can You Feel It" (The Jacksons)	Advanced

== Top 6 ==
The top six performed on 27 October 2013.

Order	Contestant	Song	Result
1	Sonke Mazibuko	"Khona" (Uhuru ft. Mafikizolo)	Advanced
2	Crystalene Nair	"Right Now" (Rihanna)	Eliminated
3	Brenden Ledwaba	"Lengoma" (Zahara)	Bottom Three
4	Zoe Zana	"Wild" (Jessie J)	Advanced
5	Bunny Majaja	"Raise Your Glass" (Pink)	Bottom Three
6	Musa Sukwene	"Via Orlando" (DJ Vetkuk vs Mahoota feat. Dr. Malinga)	Advanced

== Top 5 ==
The top five performed on 3 November 2013.

Order	Contestant	First Song	Second Song	Result
1	Musa Sukwene	"Bump n' Grind" (R. Kelly)	"Can’t Stay" (Dave Hollister)	Advanced
2	Bunny Majaja	"Show Me Love" (Robin S.)	"Ndiredi" (Simphiwe Dana)	Eliminated
3	Brenden Ledwaba	"Nice & Slow" (Usher)	"Jailer" (Aṣa)	Advanced
4	Zoe Zana	"Together Again" (Janet Jackson)	"Survivor" (Destiny's Child)	Bottom Two
5	Sonke Mazibuko	"Killing Me Softly" (The Fugees)	"Haven't Met You Yet" (Michael Bublé)	Advanced

== Top 4 ==
The top four performed on 10 November 2013.

Order	Contestant	First Song	Second Song	Result
1	Zoe Zana	"Rock with You" (Michael Jackson)	"Wrecking Ball" (Miley Cyrus)	Eliminated
2	Sonke Mazibuko	"A Song for You" (Donny Hathaway)	"Loved Me Back to Life" (Celine Dion)	Advanced
3	Musa Sukwene	"Redemption Song" (Bob Marley and the Wailers)	"Thy Will Be Done" (India.Arie ft. Gramps Morgan)	Advanced
4	Brenden Ledwaba	"Could You Be Loved" (Bob Marley and the Wailers)	"All of Me" (John Legend)	Bottom Two
N/A	Zoe Zana	"When I First Saw You" (Jamie Foxx & Beyoncé)		N/A
N/A	Sonke Mazibuko	"When I First Saw You" (Jamie Foxx & Beyoncé)		N/A
N/A	Musa Sukwene	"Same Girl" (R. Kelly & Usher)		N/A
N/A	Brenden Ledwaba	"Same Girl" (R. Kelly & Usher)		N/A

== Top 3 ==
The top three performed on 17 November 2013.

Order	Contestant	First Song	Second Song	Third Song	Result
1	Sonke Mazibuko	"Burn Out" (Sipho Mabuse)	"Turn Me On" (David Guetta ft. Nicki Minaj)	"Rhythm of the Night" (DeBarge)	Eliminated
2	Musa Sukwene	"Inkomo" (The Soil)	"Meropa" (BOP and the Mahotella Queens)	"Love" (Musiq Soulchild)	Advanced
3	Brenden Ledwaba	"Do You..." (Miguel)	"Beauty and a Beat" (Justin Bieber ft. Nicki Minaj)	"Locked Out of Heaven" (Bruno Mars)	Advanced

== Top 2 ==
The top two performed on 24 November 2013.

Order	Contestant	First Song	Second Song	Third Song	Result
1	Brenden Ledwaba	"Jailer" (Aṣa)	"Stay" (Rihanna)	"Fingerprints" (Brenden Ledwaba)	Runner-Up
2	Musa Sukwene	"Ndiyagodola" (Ringo Madlingozi)	"Sexual Healing" (Marvin Gaye)	"I Still Feel It" (Musa Sukwene)	Winner
