= Musa Sukwene =

- Born: 19 December 1986 (age 39); Witbank, South Africa
- Origin: South Africa
- Occupation: Singer
- Instrument: Vocals
- Years active: 2007–present

Musa Sukwene (born 19 December 1986) is a South African singer, originally hailing from Witbank Mpumalanga province who won the ninth season of Idols South Africa in 2013. On 3 December it was revealed that Sukwene had been signed to be represented by About Entertainment.

== Career ==
In 2016, his second studio album Mr. Serious was released and later was certified triple platinum with sales of 90,000 copies.

Musa Sukwene was diagnosed with dyslexia.

== Discography ==
=== Studio albums ===
- Dream (2014)
- Mr. Serious (2016)
- Musa (2018)
- Backroom (2022)

Preceded by Khaya Mthethwa	Idols South Africa winner Season 9 (2013)	Succeeded by Vincent Bones
