= Afrikaanse Idols =

- Hosted by: Sean Else
- Judges: Taliep Petersen; Deon Maas; Mynie Grové
- Winner: Dewald Louw
- Runner-up: Willem Botha

Release
- Original network: KykNET
- Original release: 28 May – 28 August 2006

Afrikaanse Idols was a special season of South African reality interactive show Idols South Africa based on the British talent show Pop Idol. In difference to the rest of the series this season was held entirely in Afrikaans as the host, judges and contestants did not speak English on the show and every song was performed in Afrikaans.
Although the set and stage design remained the same, the entire judging panel was formed new consisting of Afrikaans-speaking singers Mynie Grové, Taliep Petersen, who was murdered just a few weeks after the competition ended and media personality Deon Maas. The show also switched channels to KykNET, an Afrikaans sisters station of MNet and was hosted by boyband member Sean Else (Eden). The Afrikaans season was aired between the third and fourth English seasons of the show. Dewald Louw from Bloemfontein won the show. Before that he was also a contestant on the second English season of the show where he made the top 24. He also auditioned for season three but failed to progress from the first round. Next to a recording contract with Sony BMG, winner Dewald Louw also won a Peugeot 206, R50,000 from the ATKV, a Shure microphone, R3200 worth of prizes from Look &Listen, a laptop computer and a gift pack from Truworths valued at R10,000.

Auditions took place in Cape Town, Bloemfontein, Port Elizabeth, Johannesburg and for the first time auditions took place internationally in Windhoek, Namibia.

During the Live Galas one guest judge was introduced to the audience each week. They were Jennifer Jones (30 July), Amanda Luyt (6 August), Coenie de Villiers (13 August), Chris Chameleon (20 August) and Kurt Darren (27 August).

== Finals ==
=== Finalists ===
(ages stated at time of contest)

Contestant	Age	Hometown	Voted Off
Dewald Louw	19	Bloemfontein	Winner
Alzonia Titus	19	Great Brak River	28 Aug 2006
Willem Botha	19	Riversdale	28 Aug 2006
Jaco Labuschagne	26	Secunda	21 Aug 2006
Nelda Jansen van Rensburg	21	Witbank	21 Aug 2006
Joslin Pieterse	21	Mossel Bay	14 Aug 2006
Valeska Smith	23	Randburg	14 Aug 2006
Christiaan Kritzinger	23	Pretoria	7 Aug 2006
Tracey-Lee Oliver	26	Johannesburg	7 Aug 2006
Danelle de Vries	26	Worcester	31 Jul 2006
Crushanda Forbes	18	Kimberley	31 Jul 2006
Jay Theron	24	Durbanville	31 Jul 2006

=== Themes ===
- 31 July: Favourite Songs
- 7 August: Dans, Luister, Folk
- 14 August: Alternative Afrikaans Hits
- 21 August: Viewers Choice
- 10 December: Grand Finale

== Elimination Chart ==
Legend
Did Not Perform	Female	Male	Top 32	Wild Card	Top 12	Winner

Safe	Safe First	Safe Last	Eliminated

Stage:		Semi				Wild; Card	Finals				
Week:		06/25	07/02	07/09	07/16	07/23	07/31	08/07	08/14	08/21	08/28
Place	Contestant	Result									
1	Dewald Louw				1st						Winner
2	Willem Botha			1st							Runner-Up
3	Alzonia Titus				2nd				Btm 3	Btm 3	Runner-Up
4-5	Jaco Labuschagné		1st							Elim	
4-5	Nelda Jansen van Rensburg			Elim		1st	Btm 4			Elim	
6-7	Joslin Pieterse			Elim		2nd			Elim		
6-7	Valeska Smith	Elim				Saved		Btm 3	Elim		
8-9	Christiaan Kritzinger			2nd				Elim			
8-9	Tracey Lee Oliver		2nd					Elim			
10-13	Danielle De Vries	1st					Elim				
10-13	Crushanda Forbes				Elim	Saved	Elim				
10-13	Jay Theron	2nd					Elim				
Wild; Card	Emil Struwig	Elim				Elim					
Wild; Card	Rebert Roodbol				Elim	Elim					
Wild; Card	Carlo de Goede			Elim		Elim					
Wild; Card	Jacobus Wyngaard	Elim				Elim					
Semi- Final 4	Eugene Julies				Elim						
Semi- Final 4	Lizaan Vermeulen				Elim						
Semi- Final 4	Tania Wiese				Elim						
Semi- Final 4	Thiro Moshosho				Elim						
Semi- Final 3	Bernice Breedt			Elim							
Semi- Final 3	Kevin Douglas			Elim							
Semi- Final 3	Tanja Badenhorst			Elim							
Semi- Final 2	Jay Cee Krause		Elim								
Semi- Final 2	Kevin Jacobs		Elim								
Semi- Final 2	Klarina Jansen		Elim								
Semi- Final 2	Nelda Janse Van Vuuren		Elim								
Semi- Final 2	Peter Crafford		Elim								
Semi- Final 2	Wendell Reed		Elim								
Semi- Final 1	Genene Winaar	Elim									
Semi- Final 1	Henrico Harnoster	Elim									
Semi- Final 1	Samantha Brill	Elim									

=== Live show details ===
==== Heat 1 (25 June 2006) ====
Order	Artist	Song (original artists)	Result
1	Genene Winnaar	"Sonder Jou" (Amanda Luyt)	Eliminated
2	Jay Theron	"Bymekaar" (Gian Groen)	Advanced
3	Danelle de Vries	"Deurmekaar" (Karen Zoid)	Advanced
4	Jacobus Wyngaard	"Droomland" (Anton Botha)	Eliminated
5	Emil Struwig	"Sal Die Wêreld Dan Verstaan" (Rian and Nicole)	Eliminated
6	Henrico Harnoster	"Gypsy" (Mynie Grové)	Eliminated
7	Samantha Brill	"Ons Is Een" (Natasha)	Eliminated
8	Valeska Smit	"Die Mense Wat Ek Liefhet" (Laurika Rauch)	Eliminated
