= Idols South Africa season 10 =

Idols South Africa
- Season 10
- Hosted by: ProVerb
- Judges: Randall Abrahams; Unathi Msengana; Gareth Cliff
- Winner: Vincent Bones
- Runner-up: Bongi Silinda

Release
- Original network: M-Net, M-Net HD & Mzansi Magic
- Original release: 13 July – 23 November 2014

Season chronology
- ← Previous; Season 9

Idols South Africa X is the tenth season of the South African reality interactive talent show based on the British talent show Pop Idol.

The season's first show was aired on July 13, 2014.

== Auditions ==
Auditions began in February and ended in March. They took place in Johannesburg, Durban, Cape Town and Pretoria.

=== Audition dates and venues ===
- Carnival City in Johannesburg: Saturday 15 February 2014
- The Playhouse in Durban: Saturday 22 February 2014
- Grand West Casino and Entertainment World in Cape Town: Sunday 9 March
- State Theatre, Pretoria: Saturday 22 March 2014

== Performance themes ==
- Top 16: Current Hits Of 2014 (Elimination results: Chante Geary, Olivia Cloud, Mirandi Smith, Rowan DeVillers, Celine Homan)
- Top 11: Movie Magic (Elimination results:Ivan Roux and Vincent Verhoog)
- Top 9: How It Should Have Been Done (Elimination results:Roxy McVean)
- Top 8: Songs From 1994 (Elimination results:Tumi Morobane)
- Top 7: Stripped Down (Elimination results:Demi Lee Moore)
- Top 6: Showstopper Theme (Elimination results:Musa Mashiane)
- Top 5: Albums Of All Time + Most Downloaded Hits Of All Time (Elimination results:Kyle Deutschmann)
- Top 4: Old School Vs New School (Elimination results:London Louw)
- Top 3: Songs Chosen By The Producers +Songs From The Year You Were Born In + Songs You Wisheed To Perform On The Show (Elimination results:Lize Mynhardt)
- Top 2: Songs They Auditioned With + Judge's Favourite Performances + Their Own Singles (Final 2:Bongiwe Silinda and Vincent Bones)

== Top 16 ==
First Group

	Contestant	Age	Hometown	Sex	Occupation
1	Bongi Silinda	23	Nelspruit	Female	Singer
2	Celine Homan	17	Gordon's Bay	Female	Student
3	Chante Geary	20	eMalahleni	Female	Student
4	Ivan Roux	24	Centurion	Male	Hairdresser
5	London Louw	24	Mafikeng	Male	Dancer
6	Mirandi Smith	26	Rustenburg	Female	Singer
7	Vincent Bones	29	Pietermaritzburg	Male	Church worship leader
8	Vincent Verhoog	25	Durban	Male	Driver

Order	Contestant	Song	Original Artist	Result
1	Mirandi Smith	"Keep On"	BlackByrd	Eliminated
2	Vincent Verhoog	"Rude"	Magic!	Top 11 ^{1}
3	Celine Homan	"XO"	Beyoncé	Eliminated
4	London Louw	"Rather Be"	Clean Bandit	Top 11
5	Chante Geary	"Budapest"	George Ezra	Eliminated
6	Bongi Silinda	"A Night to Remember"	Mary J. Blige	Top 11
7	Ivan Roux	"Hey Brother"	Avicii	Top 11 ^{1}
8	Vincent Bones	"Am I Wrong"	Nico & Vinz	Top 11

Second Group

	Contestant	Age	Hometown	Sex	Occupation
1	Demi Lee	24	Durbanville	Female	Singer
2	Kyle Deutschmann	26	Durban	Male	Singer
3	Lize Mynhardt	21	Stellenbosch	Female	Singer
4	Musa Mashiane	27	eMalahleni	Male	Singer
5	Tumi Morobane	20	Vosloorus	Female	Student
6	Olivia Cloud	16	Hyde Park	Female	Student
7	Rowan De Villiers	23	Durbanville	Male	Hockey coach
8	Roxy McVean	19	Cape Town	Female	Student

Order	Contestant	Song	Original Artist	Result
1	Olivia Cloud	"I Will Never Let You Down"	Rita Ora	Eliminated
2	Kyle Deutschmann	"Pretty Hurts"	Beyoncé	Top 11
3	Demi Lee	"Latch" ft. Sam Smith	Disclosure	Wildcard ^{2}
4	Rowan de Villiers	"A Sky Full of Stars"	Coldplay	Eliminated
5	Roxy McVean	"Waiting For Superman"	Daughtry	Wildcard ^{2}
6	Tumi Morobane	"Birthday"	Katy Perry	Top 11
7	Lize Mynhardt	"Losing Sleep"	John Newman	Top 11
8	Musa Mashiane	"The Man"	Aloe Blacc	Top 11

^1 A voting error involving misinformation occurred during the Group 1's voting period with Ivan Roux and Vincent Verhoog's profiles aired with each other's voting numbers, that affected whether one of them had achieved the fourth spot to go to the Top 10. Therefore, in the best interest of the competition, the Producers put both of them into a Top 11, and only three of the remaining 6 contestants from Group 1 will advance to the Top 11 on the Public's vote.

^2 Prior to the Voting Error, the Top 10 would consist of 8 contestants selected from the two Groups by the Public, and 2 contestants selected by the Judges as their Wildcard picks. This mechanic stayed after the Voting Error was discovered in Group 1's voting period. Demi Lee and Roxy McVean were chosen by the Judges to advance to the Top 11.

== Top 11 – Movie Magic ==
21 September 2014

Order	Contestant	Song	Featured Movie	Result
1	Bongi Silinda	"GoldenEye"	GoldenEye	Top 4
2	London Louw	"Independent Women"	Charlie's Angels	Bottom three
3	Vincent Verhoog	"Fly Like an Eagle" – cover by Seal	Space Jam	Eliminated
4	Tumi Morobane	"There You'll Be"	Pearl Harbor	Safe
5	Ivan Roux	"Kiss" – cover by Nicole Kidman	Happy Feet	Eliminated
6	Kyle Deutschmann	"Radioactive"	The Host	Safe
7	Musa Mashiane	"I Got A Woman"	Ray	Top 4
8	Lize Mynhardt	"Unchained Melody"	Ghost	Top 4
9	Vincent Bones	"Purple Rain"	Purple Rain	Top 4
10	Roxy McVean	"Shut Up and Drive"	The House Bunny	Bottom four
11	Demi Lee	"I Don't Want to Miss a Thing"	Armaggeddon	Safe

- Guest Mentor: Gordon Chambers
- Group performance: "Lost Stars" by Adam Levine

== Top 9 – How It Should Have Been Done ==
28 September 2014

- Guest Mentor: AKA
- Guest Performances:
  "Run Jozi" ft. K.O. by AKA
  "Lonely" by Mark Haze

== Elimination chart ==
Females	Males	Top 16	Top 11	Wild Card	Winner

Did Not Perform	Safe	Most votes	Safe First	Safe Last	Eliminated

Stage:		Group 1	Group 2	Finals									
Week:		9/7	9/14	9/21	9/28	10/5	10/12	10/19	10/26	11/2	11/9	11/16	11/23
Place	Contestant	Result											
1	Vincent Bones	Top 11		1st 29.52%	1st 34.24%	1st 30.44%	1st 30.02%	1st 28.02%	1st 30.72%	2nd 32.32%	1st 39.37%	Winner; 50.49%	
2	Bongi Silinda	Top 11		2nd 13.81%	2nd 12.08%	2nd 14.33%	2nd 15.38%	2nd 21.11%	2nd 26.72%	1st 33.89%	2nd 36.17%	Runner-up; 49.51%	
3	Lize Mynhardt		Top 11	4th 9.72%	3rd 9.41%	6th 9.13%	3rd 13.90%	3rd 15.36%	3rd 15.84%	3rd 18.72%	3rd 24.46%		
4	London Louw	Top 11		9th 3.78%	8th 6.32%	7th 7.89%	5th 10.05%	4th 12.66%	4th 13.40%	4th 15.06%			
5	Kyle Deutschmann		Top 11	5th 7.20%	7th 7.97%	4th 10.81%	4th 11.91%	5th 12.46%	5th 13.31%				
6	Musa Mashiane		Top 11	3rd 12.74%	4th 9.09%	3rd 10.86%	6th 9.43%	6th 10.40%					
7	Demi Lee		Wild Card	6th 6.91%	5th 8.87%	5th 9.36%	7th 9.31%						
8	Tumi Morobane		Top 11	7th 5.74%	6th 8.54%	8th 7.18%							
9	Roxy McVean		Wild Card	8th 4.18%	9th 3.49%								
10	Vincent Verhoog	Top 11		10th 3.33%									
11	Ivan Roux	Top 11		11th 3.06%									
11–16	Rowan de Villiers	Elim											
11–16	Celine Homan	Elim											
11–16	Chante Geary	Elim											
11–16	Mirandi Smith	Elim											
11–16	Olivia Cloud	Elim											
