= Vincent Bones =

South African singer

Vincent Bones (born 29 October 1984) is a South African singer who won the tenth season of Idols South Africa in 2014. After the voting stats were revealed Bones won almost every vote except in the top 4 where Bongi Silinda overtook him and won the most votes.
