= Penny Lebyane =

South African media personality (born 1976)

- Born: Penny Matsidiso Lebyane; 25 December 1976 (age 49); Bushbuckridge, Mbombela, South Africa
- Education: University of South Africa
- Occupations: Radio Host, Television Presenter
- Years active: 1998–present

Penny Matsidiso Lebyane (born 25 December 1976) is a South African radio and television presenter, disc jockey and media entrepreneur. She rose to prominence as a Metro FM DJ (1998–2010) and E.tv breakfast show host (2014–2018), served as a judge on Idols South Africa (season 1) in 2002, has fronted lifestyle and breakfast shows including Motswako (2010–2013) and Sunrise (2014–2018) and has since fronted both community-focused talk series (e.g. The Big Secret) and relationship-advice programmes on Moja Love.

== Early life and education ==
Lebyane was born on 25 December 1976 in Bushbuckridge, Ehlanzeni District, Mpumalanga, and later moved with her family to KwaZulu-Natal. She matriculated from Thaba Jabula High School before earning a National Diploma in Public Relations, Communication and Media Studies at the University of South Africa in 1997.

== Career ==
=== Radio ===
Lebyane began broadcasting at age 17 on Soweto community stations. Initially, she as a newsreader on The Voice of Soweto and was recruited by Metro FM in November 1998. Over nearly twelve years at Metro, she hosted flagship slots and became known for her outspoken style. In 2011, she joined Thobela FM to host Madiboga a Gauta between 11am-1pm.

=== Television ===
In 2010 she joined SABC 2's Motswako as both a host and producer, focusing on women's empowerment, before signing on to E.tv's breakfast show Sunrise (2014–2018), where she led daily interviews and current-affairs debates.

- Served as a contestant on I Love South Africa (Season 2).
- Appeared as Noxi in City Ses'la (Season 2).
- Hosted the 8th Metro FM Music Awards alongside Siyabonga Ngwekazi in November 2007

=== Recent projects ===
Since 2022, Lebyane has hosted BET Africa's social-issues series The Big Secret and currently presents Moja Love programmes including Let's Talk Papgeld (on child maintenance), 360° Insight on the Impact of Child Maintenance SA and the relationship-therapy show UnBreak My Heart.

== Entrepreneurship ==
In November 1997, Lebyane founded the Penny Lebyane Company, a media production house through which she develops and hosts community-driven content across radio and television.

== Personal life ==
Lebyane has two children. In 2008, during a high-profile contractual dispute with Metro FM, she separated from her then-husband, Ali Naka, and briefly returned to live with her parents in Soweto. She has public said that Ali Naka is a deadbeat father. She is based in Randburg, Gauteng. Lebyane also used to date DJ Fresh (South African DJ).

== Filmography ==
Year	Show	Role
2002	Idols South Africa | Season 1	Judge (Herself)
2007	Metro FM Music Awards (8th annual)	Co-host
2010–2013	Motswako	Co-host / producer
2014–2018	Sunrise	Anchor
2015	City Ses'la	Noxi
2015	I Love South Africa	Contestant (Herself)
2016	It's OK We're Family	Herself
2017	SAFTAs (9th South African Film and Television Awards	Presenter (Herself)
2022	The Search: E! Host South Africa	Guest Judge (Herself)
2022–	The Big Secret	Host (Herself)
2023	The South African Music Awards (19th SAMAs)	Presenter (Herself)
