= Veronique de Lange =

South African singer

Veronique de Lange (born September 1987) also known as Nicky, to avoid confusion with Veronique Lalouette (also a contestant in Idols called "V"), is a South African singer who rose to popularity after placing 3rd in season 3 of Idols, the South African version of Pop Idol, shown by M-Net. She teamed up with fellow Idols III contestants Kesha Charlton-Perkins and Deidre Visser in 2006 to form a girl-group named NKD (the girl's initials). Their first track; entitled "I Want Your Love" is the new SuperSport theme tune. Their debut album, entitled 'What's That Noise', was released in October 2006. Their debut video is available to watch on YouTube called "What I believe".

- Previous formal training: Phillip Kotze Sing Studio in Bloemfontein

== Idols III performances ==
Auditions: Foolish Games by Jewel
Semi Finals: Unchained Melody by The Righteous Brothers/Gareth Gates
Semi Finals: Since You've Been Gone by Kelly Clarkson
Top 12: Try by Nelly Furtado
Top 11: Crush by Jennifer Paige/Kelvin Wood and Autone featuring Amanda Wilson
Top 10: Searchin' My Soul by Vonda Shepard
Top 9: What's Love Got To Do With It by Tina Turner
Top 8: My Immortal by Evanescence
Top 8: Just A Little by Liberty X
Top 6: Underneath Your Clothes by Shakira Brass in Pocket by The Pretenders
Top 5: Foolish Games Jewel and Small Room by Karen Zoid
Top 4: It’s All Coming Back To Me Now by Pandora's Box/Celine Dion/Meat Loaf and Marion Raven and How Do I Live by LeAnn Rimes/Trisha Yearwood

NKD made waves in the South African music industry from 2006. These are some of their achievements: NKD performed as the opening act for many international stars that toured South Africa like Westlife, Ronan Keeting, Michael learns to rock, Michael Bolton, UK X-factor winner Shane Ward and South Africa's very own Johnny Clegg. NKD won a “People’s Crystal award” (SA People Magazine) for “The Best newcomer” in 2007. NKD was nominated for 2 SAMA's (South African Music Awards) in 2007 and 2010 for “Best Pop Album” They were also nominated for a “YOU Spectacular” (YOU magazine) with the likes of Freshlyground (South African Music Awards winners who recorded and performed “WAKA WAKA” with Shakira at the 2010 Soccer World Cup) and The Parlotones (FHM Readers’ Choice awards, numerous SAMA awards and opening act for Coldplay 2012) for “Music Stars of the Year” Their singles “What I believe” and “Don’t miss you” (written by Bishanyia Vincent aka Ranger Bec) was on 2 NOW Compilation CD's and became chart toppers on radio stations in South Africa (Jacaranda FM, Highveld Stereo, Algoa FM, Bay FM, 5FM and many other local stations)

Nicky is also no stranger to the limelight as she has performed and appeared on many TV programs like "Egoli", "7de Laan", "Binnelanders", “Liriekeraai”, “Noot vir Noot”, “DKNT”, “Jukebox”, “K-TV”, “YO-tv”, “Dis hoe dit is met Steve”, “Glitterati” etc. NKD also performed live at “Miss SA Teen” and the Idols Finale, Season 4.

In May 2009 Nicky left NKD and became a freelance singer.

She recorded a duet with Bok van Blerk “Anderkant die treinspoor” and did the backing vocals on his 3rd studio album “My Kreet” (this album reached platinum status in South Africa). Nicky also toured internationally with Bok van Blerk, performing in London, Wembley Stadium (Springboks vs. Saracens rugby game 2009), New Zealand 2009 Dubai 2014 London, Allianz Park (Blue Bulls vs Saracens 2015)

She also featured in the TV program “Bok vir Sports” in 2011 as part of the band, on a very popular South African channel called KykNet, which showcased a national tour with Bok van Blerk along the South African coastline. She was part of the band in 2 episodes of the popular rugby chat program “Toks en Tjops” on Supersport channel and KykNet in 2011 with famous Afrikaans artists like Bok van Blerk, Robbie Wessels, Theuns Jordaan, Juanita Du Plessis. Other artists which she has also performed with include Bobby van Jaarsveld, Ricus Nel, Dozi and Andries Botha (Africa Bike week – House Band 2014), Liza Bronner and Hanna Grobler.

In 2014 she was the backing vocalist on the very popular production called "Afrikaans is Groot".

In 2009 she also started a cover band called Nicky and the Niceguys . In 2012 they released their original project and CD called Sunny Side Up Band. They've toured all over the country with these 2 bands and played at festivals like Harley Davidson's Africa Bike week (as one of the main acts) Thabazimbi Wildsfees Karoo Lus Fees – Graaff Reinet Hoedspruit Wildsfees Other popular venues which they've performed at is Sun City Valley of the Waves, Monte Casino (Cobra day), Carousel Casino and also many year end functions, parties and weddings.

Nicky is currently in the United Arab Emirates where she is performing as a freelance singer at many different venues.

== Discography ==
Albums

- Idols 3: The Top 12 (November 2005)
- What's That Noise? - NKD (October 2006)

Singles

- What I Believe - NKD
- "Don't miss you - NKD"

== Music Video's ==
What's that Noise

What I believe
