= Marah Louw =

South African singer-songwriter

- Born: Marah Teboho Louw; 17 July 1952 (age 74); Mzimhlophe, Soweto, Gauteng, South Africa
- Occupations: Singer; songwriter; actress; television personality; anti-apartheid activist
- Known for: Idols South Africa (judge)
- Spouse(s): Bill Thomson (m. 1986; div. 2004)
- Children: 1
- Musical career
- Genres: Gospel; Afro-soul; African music; world; hymns
- Instruments: Vocals
- Years active: 1970-present

Marah Teboho Louw (born 17 July 1952), also known as Marah Louw Thomson or Mara Louw, is a South African singer, songwriter and actress. She was born in the township of Mzimhlophe in Soweto, South Africa.

She started singing in a choral group at the age of ten during which she toured Japan, Hong Kong, Philippines, South Africa and the United Kingdom.

Upon her return to South Africa she toured Zambia, Botswana, Zimbabwe, Lesotho, Swaziland and Namibia as a solo artist.

Louw sang at the 1988 Nelson Mandela 70th Birthday Tribute concert at Wembley Stadium, London in support of the anti-apartheid struggle.

She was an actress on the South African television series The Queen where she played the character Boi Maake until departing from the show in 2017.

She was also a judge on the second season of Idols South Africa.

In August 2021 Louw presented to the South African parliament's Committee on Trade and Industry in support of copyright reform and royalty rights for artists.
