= Colin Moss (actor) =

South African actor

- Born: Colin Moss; 9 February 1976 (age 50); Johannesburg, South Africa
- Other name: Cole
- Education: University of Kwazulu-Natal
- Occupations: Actor; presenter; stand-up comedian; TV presenter
- Years active: 1998–present
- Height: 1.8 m (5 ft 11 in)
- Spouse: Tamarin Kaplan (m. 2014)
- Parents: Richard Moss (father); Veronica Salt (mother)
- Website: https://www.colinmoss.com

Colin 'Cole' Moss (born 9 February 1976) is a South African actor primarily active in British, American and South African cinema and television.

== Personal life ==
He was born on 9 February 1976 in Johannesburg, South Africa. His father, Richard Moss, is British-South African. His paternal grandfather was Cockney. His mother, Veronica Salt, was of an Irish background. He has played ukulele and saxophone.

He is married to South African director, Tamarin Kaplan. The wedding was celebrated in 2014 in Stellenbosch.

== Career ==
He started his acting career as a stand-up comedian on the South African stand-up comedy circuit. He continued to perform comedy between acting gigs for many years. Later he graduated with a degree in drama at the University of Kwazulu-Natal in 1996. He started acting through some theater productions such as Fat Pig and My Zinc Bed. At the end of the 1990s, he performed regularly with his own stage programs as a comedian in South Africa and at various comedy festivals. a. also in Great Britain and Ireland. In the further course of his career, Moss continued to work as a comedian. Since 2003 head of the comedy troupe 'Comedy All Stars Cape Town' in Cape Town. In 2010, he performed his own comedy program at the Stand Up Comedy Club in New York City.

In 1998, he made his television debut with the television serial Isidingo where he played the role 'Stewart Buller'. He appeared in the series from 1999 to 2001 with huge popularity. Then he went to Cape Town, and worked as a television presenter for various television shows, including 2001 TV show City Life. In 2002, he became the presenter of the stunt show Fear Factor. In 2003, 2005 and 2007 he took over the moderation of the music and talent show 'Idols South Africa' in season 3.

In 2005, Moss played the leading male role in the South African drama Number 10. Then he starred in the South African Horror Cryptid in 2006 took over the role of Mioss Dan Huevelman. In 2007, he joined with the South African comedy film Big Fellas and played one of the two main roles; 'young Jake Holmes'. In the same year, he acted in the British-South African film The Hidden World where he played the role of 'Officer De Witt'. In 2008, he had a supporting role as 'John' in the Italian-French comedy Ex. Then he played the documentary filmmaker and expedition member 'Dexter "Dex" Simms' in the horror film Surviving Evil in 2009.

Due to his western look, he has selected for many international film roles such as: 'Officer DeWitt' in the period drama The World Unseen. The film received critical acclaim and won several international awards. Then he made a lead role in the film Surviving Evil where he acted alongside Billy Zane. He also played the role of 'Max' in a BBC adaptation of D.H. Lawrence's Women in Love. Moss played the role 'Kevin Fuller' in the film Momentum alongside James Purefoy and Morgan Freeman.

In March 2014, he appeared in the German television film Elly Beinhorn: Solo Flight. In 2015, he relocated to New York City and quickly signed by The Talent House. After that, he played a recurring role 'Justin Boden' on Marvel's hit Netflix series, Jessica Jones. Then he played the role of 'Anthony' in the Netflix's Black Mirror as well as in David Simon's series The Deuce. Meanwhile, he made a supporting role in the film Then Came You and the supportive role of 'Drew Conrad' in the film Christmas in the Wild.

In 2019, he played the role 'Hath' in SyFy Channel's television serial Vagrant Queen, which marked his first series regular role for an American channel.

== Filmography ==
Year	Film	Role	Genre	Ref.
1998	Isidingo	Stewart Buller	TV series	
2002	Cavegirl	Mud	TV series	
2004	Charlie	Phillip at Barracks	Film	
2004	Berserker: Hell's Warrior	Norseman	Film	
2004	Blast	Rig Worker 1	Film	
2005	Straight Outta Benoni	Manziman's brother	Film	
2006	Number 10	James Kramer	Film	
2006	Cryptids	Dan Huevelman	Film	
2007	The World Unseen	De Witt	Film	
2007	Big Fellas	Jake Holmes	Film	
2008	Special Forces Heroes	Alan Marshall	TV series documentary	
2009	Ex	John	Film	
2009	Surviving Evil	Dexter 'Dex' Simms	Film	
2010	Way of the Warrior	Writer, executive producer	TV series	
2011	Women in Love	Maxim	TV mini-series	
2012	Casting Me...	Phillip	Film	
2012	Wild at Heart	Martin	TV series	
2014	Elly Beinhorn: Solo Flight	Moye W. Stephens	TV movie	
2014	SEAL Team 8: Behind Enemy Lines	Dan	Home movie	
2015	Momentum	Kevin Fuller	Film	
2015	Jessica Jones	Justin Boden	TV series	
2016	Cape Town	Brian Louis	TV mini-series	
2016	Black Mirror	Anthony	TV series	
2017	The Deuce	Well-Heeled John	TV series	
2018	Then Came You	Greg	Film	
2019	Holiday in the Wild	Drew	Film	
2020	Fried Barry	Jack	Film	
2020	Vagrant Queen	Hath	TV series	
2021	Angeliena	Lawrence Mitchell	Film	
2022	Abraham Lincoln	William H. Seward	3 episodes Television miniseries	
2023	1923	Charles Hardin	1 episode, TV series	
