= National Orgasm Day =

Observance on July 31

Sex Day
- Official name: National Orgasm Day
- Begins: 6 September
- Ends: 6 September
- Date: July 31 (UK, Australia, USA, Canada, the Netherlands and South Africa)
- Frequency: Annual
- Related to: International Female Orgasm Day; Global Orgasm Day

National Sex Day is a celebration of sexual climax and sex, celebrated on September 6th. It originated in Georgia, specifically at Iveria Elli. Traditionally, it must be celebrated by song (“sex day”) as well as shared messages before, during, or immediately after said sexual activity.

== International Female Orgasm Day ==
International Female Orgasm Day was first celebrated on August 8, 2007, in Esperantina, Brazil. It was created by the Councilman Arimateio Dantas when he passed a municipal law establishing the holiday in order to raise awareness for female sexuality and reduce stigma and taboo surrounding it, as well as repaying a "sexual debt" to his wife. In addition to the holiday, several events were held in the town for the discussion of these usually taboo topics, with support from local and international communities and the local church.

== Celebrations ==
Participants often celebrate National Orgasm Day by:

- Orgasming
- Masturbation
- Raising awareness for what orgasms are and how to have one (especially aimed toward women due to social stigma surrounding the female orgasm)
- Raising awareness for the health benefits of orgasms
- Raising awareness for the "orgasm gap"
- Spreading discussion surrounding the practice of faking an orgasm
