= Karin Kortje =

- Born: Karin Kortje; Cape Town, South Africa
- Origin: Cape Town, South Africa
- Genres: Pop, R&B
- Occupation: Singer
- Instrument: Vocals
- Years active: 2005–present
- Label: Sony BMG
- Website: http://www.IdolKarin.wordpress.com

Karin Kortje is a South African singer who won the third season of Idols in 2005.

According to the voting results released by M-Net, Kortje received the most votes during each week's count, making her the most popular contestant during the entire season. Kortje received 65% of the final votes. Her debut album, Forever and a Day (2006), was certified Gold in South Africa.

== Idols performances ==
- Group stages (Group 2): Ordinary People (John Legend)
- Group stages (Group 2): A Cry, A Smile (Judith Sephuma)
- Top 12: Don't Know Why (Norah Jones)
- Top 11: Un-Break My Heart (Toni Braxton)
- Top 10: Can't Fight the Moonlight (LeAnn Rimes)
- Top 9: (They Long to Be) Close to You (The Carpenters)
- Top 8: (You Make Me Feel Like) A Natural Woman (Aretha Franklin)
- Top 8: Together Again (Janet Jackson)
- Top 6: Theme from Mahogany (Do You Know Where You're Going To) (Diana Ross)
- Top 6: If I Can't Have You (Yvonne Elliman)
- Top 5: Never Never Never (Shirley Bassey)
- Top 5: Never Too Much (Mary J. Blige)
- Top 4: When I Need You (Leo Sayer)
- Top 4: I Have Nothing (Whitney Houston)
- Top 2: (You Make Me Feel Like) A Natural Woman (Aretha Franklin)
- Top 2: If I Can't Have You (Yvonne Elliman)
- Top 2: I'm So Ready (The winner's single)

== Life after Idols ==
A week after winning the third season of Idols, South Africa, Kortje released a three-track mini album through record label Sony BMG. It featured the Christmas carol "Joy to the World" and a cover of the John Legend hit "Ordinary People", as well as her winning single "I'm So Ready", which received frequent airplay on radio stations nationwide. She also met former South African president Nelson Mandela shortly after her Idols win.

In January 2006, Kortje started working on her debut album; she wanted the songs to have an inspirational message. The album, titled Forever and a Day, was released through Sony BMG on 11 November 2006, and received generally positive critical reviews, especially for the title track, "Forever and a Day". The album, which contained four radio singles ("Forever and a Day", "I'm So Ready", "Never Never Never" and "If I Can't Have You"), ended up selling over 20,000 copies, reaching Gold Status in South Africa.

Also in 2006, Kortje won the You Magazine You Spectacular award for "News Maker of the Year". Kortje has since appeared on the covers of several magazines, including Sarie, Huisgenoot and You.

In 2009, Kortje released a new single, "Love in the First Degree", which held the number one spot on Good Hope FM and Heart 104.9 FM's SA TOP 10 Charts for several consecutive weeks, and was featured on DJ Keith's album. She also recorded "Hark The Angels" for the Good Hope FM Christmas album, released in December 2009.

Kortje married Shaundore Aspeling on 29 August 2009 in her hometown, Grabouw. Gift Gwe, runner–up in Idols Season 3, performed for her on her wedding day.

In 2011, Kortje released the Gospel single "Discovering", which she performed live on South African comedian Soli Philander's television show Taxi Vision. She also starred in the musical This Is My Life telling her life story, before, during and after Idols, alongside Idols South Africa Winner Season 4 Jody Williams. The show was renewed for a second season, this time with Emo Adams' older brother Loukmaan Adams starring alongside Kortje.

Kortje traveled to Sydney to perform in 2012, as well as performing alongside Judy Boucher in the Divas show.

In 2013, Kortje's one-woman show in Afrikaans, "Die Held Store", was nominated for an ABSA Kana award at the ABSA KKNK. Kortje returned to the ABSA KKNK stage in 2014, this time performing on the TOP 40 stage. Also in 2014, Kortje featured alongside LeAnne Dlamini and Belinda Davids as official opening acts of the "Divas 2014" show in Grand Arena Grand West Cape Town.

== Discography ==
=== Albums ===
- Idols 3: The Top 12 (November 2005)
- Forever and a Day (November 2006)

=== Singles ===
- I'm So Ready (November 2005)
- Forever and a Day
- "Never Never Never"
- "If I Can't Have You"
- "Love in the First Degree" (2009)
- "Hark The Angels" (2009)
- "Discovering" (2011)
