= Independent Love Song =

1995 single by Scarlet

Single by Scarlet

from the album Naked
- B-side: "The Fall"
- Released: 9 January 1995
- Genre: Power pop
- Length: 3:51
- Label: WEA
- Songwriters: Cheryl Parker; Jo Youle
- Producers: Mike Paxman; Paul Muggleton

Scarlet singles chronology
"I Really Like the Idea" (1994)	"Independent Love Song" (1995)	"I Wanna Be Free (To Be with Him)" (1995)

"Independent Love Song" is a song by British musical duo Scarlet, taken from their debut album, Naked (1994), and released as a single on 9 January 1995 by WEA. The power ballad, written by Cheryl Parker and Jo Youle, and produced by Mike Paxman and Paul Muggleton, was a hit in several countries. It entered the UK Singles Chart at number 26, reaching a peak of number 12 in February 1995. The single became a top-ten hit on the Irish Singles Chart, where it peaked at number 10, and charted within the top 50 in Germany, Iceland, Sweden, and Switzerland. Other tracks on the release included "The Fall" and "Independent Love Song" (3am mix).

== Critical reception ==
Larry Flick from Billboard magazine wrote, "There is not much innovation, just a booming power ballad with simple lyrics, dramatic instrumentation, and a female lead vocal that soars to glass-shattering soprano heights. It certainly works, pressing every reactionary listener button. Translation: This single should become an immediate AC radio staple." In his weekly UK chart commentary, James Masterton said, "My own very personal view is that it is easily one of the singles of the year, a startlingly beautiful power-pop ballad, one of those rare records that has the capacity to move you to tears when played at high volume. Alright so I'm biased in this particular commentary but if there is any record which should, nay deserves to be a massive hit it is this one."

Pan-European magazine Music & Media said, "The ghost of Shakespears Sister will stay with you through Scarlet, another female pop duo with a harmless tic. Winter time has proven to be the right moment for such orchestrated pop." A reviewer from Music Week described it as "slow-burning balladry from female duo signed by WEA A&R consultant Gary Crowley." Andy Richardson from NME was very negative to the song, saying, "Pompous, hand-wringly bad, self-important and, worst of all, soulless."

German punk band The Bates covered the song in 1998 and released it as a single as well.

== Music video ==
The accompanying music video for "Independent Love Song" was directed by German director Marcus Nispel and produced by Shelley Bloch for Portofolio. It was released on 3 October 1994 and was shot in Times Square, New York with an audience of grunge cherubs. The black-and-white video shows Cheryl Parker (vocals) sitting on a piano with Jo Youle (pianist) performing the song, while children dressed as Cupid shoot passers-by to make them fall in love.

== Track listings ==
- UK 7-inch and cassette single
1. "Independent Love Song" – 3:51
2. "Independent Love Song" (original 7-inch version) – 3:47
- UK, European and Australian CD single
1. "Independent Love Song" – 3:51
2. "The Fall" – 4:15
3. "Independent Love Song" (3AM mix) – 3:48

== Charts ==
=== Weekly charts ===
Chart (1995)	Peak position
Europe (Eurochart Hot 100)	60
Europe (European Hit Radio)	12
Germany (GfK)	50
Iceland (Íslenski Listinn Topp 40)	14
Ireland (IRMA)	10
Israel (Israeli Singles Chart)	1
Netherlands (Dutch Single Tip)	2
Scottish Singles Sales (Official Charts)	10
Sweden (Sverigetopplistan)	25
Switzerland (Schweizer Hitparade)	23
UK Singles (Official Charts)	12

=== Year-end charts ===
Chart (1995)	Position
Israel (Israeli Singles Chart)	21
Latvia (Latvijas Top 50)	123
UK Singles (OCC)	79
UK Airplay (Music Week)	27

== Release history ==
Region	Date	Format(s)	Label(s)	Ref.
United Kingdom	9 January 1995	7-inch vinyl; CD; cassette	WEA	
Australia	23 January 1995	CD; cassette	WEA	
