= Heinz Winckler =

South African singer (born 1978)

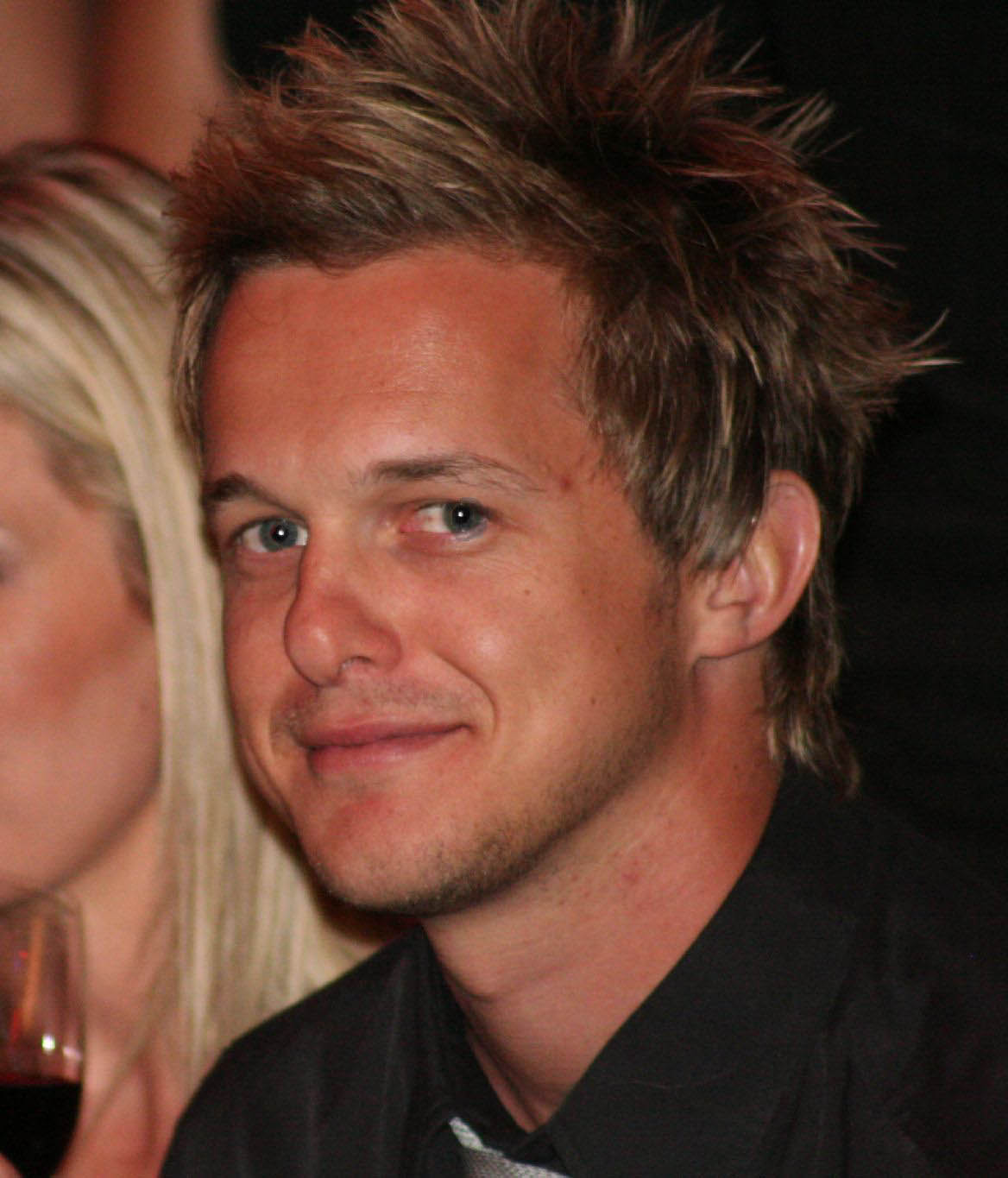
- Heinz Winckler in 2007

Background information
- Born: Heinz Carl Heinrich Winckler; 22 March 1978 (age 47)
- Origin: Stellenbosch, Cape Province, South Africa
- Occupation: Singer
- Instruments: Singing, guitar
- Years active: 2002–present
- Website: https://heinzwinckler.com/

Heinz Carl Heinrich Winckler (born 22 March 1978) is a South African singer and the winner of the first series of South African Idols and is also an actor.

Born the eldest of three children in Stellenbosch, South Africa, he went on to study law at Stellenbosch University. After winning the Idols competition in June 2002, he discontinued his studies to devote time to a music career.

== Idols ==
Idols was the South African version of the British Pop Idol show, and was presented as a talent search competition with successive elimination rounds narrowing the number of contestants. Throughout the show, Winckler was referred to as "Hunky Heinz" because of his good looks.

=== Songs performed on Idols ===
- Audition: "I'm a Believer", by Smash Mouth
- Top 50: "Drops of Jupiter (Tell Me)", by Train
- Top 11: "I Don't Wanna Miss A Thing", by Aerosmith
- Top 8: "Higher", by Creed
- Top 6: "Shallow Waters", by Just Jinger
- Top 4: "Every Breath You Take", by The Police
- Top 4: "Soledad", by Westlife
- Finale: "Once in a Lifetime" (original song); Drops of Jupiter (Tell Me), by Train; Soledad, by Westlife

== Post-Idols career ==
Winckler's debut single, Once In A Lifetime, went double platinum in South Africa for having sold over 100,000 copies. His subsequent debut album, One Step Closer, included this song as well as Soledad, a cover of the Westlife song which he performed during Idols, and Next Stop Happiness, which became a single as well.

He was nominated for two South African Music Awards, including best single for "Once in a Lifetime" and best pop album for One Step Closer.

In 2003, with the inaugural World Idol competition, Winckler came fourth behind Belgium's Peter Evrard (3rd), the US's Kelly Clarkson (2nd), and Norway's Kurt Nilsen (Winner).

His second album, Come Alive, was released via BMG, and features more ballads and rhythmic songs. It includes the singles "Can't Lose With You" and "Thank You", as well as "I Don't Wanna Miss A Thing". Also included are songs written by himself; "Drowning Me" is a track co-written by him.

He performed "Chasing Shadows", the theme song for the South African release of the 2003 Disney movie Treasure Planet.

Heinz married Alette De Klerk on 25 September 2006 in South Africa. They have three sons and a baby girl.

In 2006, Heinz released his third studio album, Moment of Truth.

He has twice appeared on the music game show Noot vir Noot as a guest artist, in seasons 36 and 39. He also appeared as a coach on the Afrikaans music reality show Supersterre.

== Discography ==
Albums

- Idols: The Album (2002)
- One Step Closer (November 2002)
- Come Alive (September 2004)
- Moment Of Truth (September 2006)
- Ek kan weer in liefde glo (October 2009)
- 24/7/365 (2011)
- Jy's bonatuurlik (2014)

Singles

- Once in a Lifetime (June 2002)
- Next Stop Happiness (March 2004)
- One Step Closer
- The Way It Is
- Can't Lose With You
- Drowning Me
- Only For You
- Thank You
- Another Day
- Love's Supposed To Be
- Who You Really Are (2011, for the Eurovision contest)

== Acting career ==
He performed in the role of Roger Davis in the touring production of the musical Rent from the 2007–2008 season.

In 2015, Winckler starred in the romantic comedy Mooirivier playing a singer performing at an Easter music festival.
