= Scarlet (British band) =

English pop duo

- Origin: Kingston upon Hull, England
- Genres: Pop rock, indie pop, soft rock
- Years active: 1992–1996
- Label: WEA
- Past members: Cheryl Parker; Jo Youle; Joanna Fox

Scarlet were an English pop duo from Hull, East Riding of Yorkshire, England. They consisted of Cheryl Parker (vocalist, guitarist) and Jo Youle (pianist, keyboardist, vocalist). The group originally had a third member, Joanna Fox (flautist, vocalist), but she left before the band had any major success.

== Career ==
Parker, Youle and Fox met at secondary school and started playing together locally around Hull as Cheap Day Return with bass-player Ed Clark in the late 1980s. Trimming down to a trio, the three girls moved to London in 1991 and signed a publishing deal with Chrysalis Music some months later. In 1992, they signed to independent record label Haven Records and released two singles that year: "Piccadilly in the Rain (I'll Be There)" and "Shine on Me Now", neither of which charted.

In 1993, they signed to WEA, and started recording their debut album. The first single, "I Really Like the Idea", was released in 1994, but it failed to chart. Fox left the band after the release of this single, and Parker and Youle carried on as a duo.

The duo's next single, "Independent Love Song", was released in late 1994 and became their biggest hit, peaking at number 12 in the UK in January 1995. This success also earned the duo a guest spot on the BBC's A Song for Europe 1995 contest. This was followed by their debut album Naked, which was released in February 1995, and peaked at number 59. At the time they were supporting Bryan Ferry on tour in the UK. Although Joanna Fox was no longer part of the group, she received a backing vocalist credit on the album.

The group's next UK single, "I Wanna Be Free (To Be With Him)", was another Top 30 hit (UK No. 21), whilst the next single release, "Love Hangover", did not achieve the same success (UK No. 54).

In 1996, Scarlet issued a new single, "Bad Girl", but this also stalled at number 54. Their second album, Chemistry, missed the UK Albums Chart completely, and after this relative failure their record label WEA dropped the band and they went their separate ways.

"Independent Love Song" can be found on the soundtrack to the film Bed of Roses and on the soundtrack for the teen sitcom Derry Girls.

== Discography ==
=== Albums ===
- Naked (1995) – UK No. 59
- Chemistry (1996)

=== Singles ===
- "Piccadilly in the Rain (I'll Be There)" (1992)
- "Shine on Me Now" (1992)
- "I Really Like the Idea" (1994)
- "Independent Love Song" (1995) – UK No. 12
- "I Wanna Be Free (To Be with Him)" (1995) – UK No. 21
- "Love Hangover" (1995) – UK No. 54
- "Bad Girl" (1996) – UK No. 54
