= Letoya Makhene =

South African actress

- Born: Letoya Makhene; 7 September 1984 (age 41)
- Occupations: Singer, actress, television personality
- Years active: 2000s – present
- Notable work: Generations:The Legacy
- Title: Mrs
- Father: Johannes Makhene

Letoya Makhene-Pulumo (born 7 September 1984) is a South African actress, singer, traditional doctor, and TV personality. She is well known for acting in South Africa's famous soap operas, Isidingo and Generations:The Legacy and she is a daughter of an actor, singer, and traditional doctor Blonde Makhene.

== Career ==
Makhene was a contestant in the first season of Idols South Africa, and a co-host in season two. She trained for several months to be a traditional healer but stopped her practice and went on to work in Generations the Legacy until late 2019. Her role was the notorious gangster wife of Kumkani Phakade a.k.a. "Gaddaffi" and as Tau Mogale's sister.

== Music career ==
She has also made appearances in the music industry from the age of seven as one of Brenda Fassie's backup singers. She also has worked with DJ Cleo in their song "The One", and also worked with DJ Qness in their song "I Get Weak" and in 2016 has released solo songs and is preparing a solo debut album. In 2016, DJ Chynaman featured Makhene in the song "Keep on Trying".

== Filmography ==
| Year | Television | Role |
|---|---|---|
| 2003-2004 | Idols SA | Semifinalist (S1); Co-Host (S2) |
| 2008-2012 | Isidingo | Boikeste Sibeko |
| 2014–2019;2020–2021 | Generations:The Legacy | Matshidiso "Tshidi" Mogale |
| 2023 | Homewrecker(South African Film) | Phumi |

== Traditional healer ==
Letoya left the screen in 2003 to take an eight-month training course at an initiation school to become a sangoma but after a while she put her sangoma duties to one side until she can find a safe place for her practice.

== Other media ==
Letoya has appeared in both issues of Bona and True Love magazine.
