= Dewald Louw =

South African musician

Dewald Louw (born 18 June 1986) is a South African singer and the winner of the first season of KykNET's Afrikaans Idols.

With him in the final were Alzonia Titus and Willem Botha.

In 2007 and 2008, Dewald got a lot of radio play with his radio singles Free To Fly and Nog 'n Hart.

Dewald was born in Durbanville, grew up in Bloemfontein and was a second year BA Media Studies student at the University of the Free State when the KykNET Idols of 2006 took place.

He made his TV debut in 2000 at the age of 12 when he was the guest artist on a popular Afrikaans music television show Noot Vir Noot. During 2002 he was the youngest finalist of the ATKV Lier Awards of 2001. In 2003, he made it to the final 32 of SA Idols, the show's second English season, however he failed to make it to the top 12 on his first try. In season three he auditioned as well without passing the first audition. In 2006, he entered and won the first and only Afrikaans KykNet Idols.

His debut CD, In Jou Oë, was recorded in a record time by Sony BMG. At the end of 2007 Dewald performed the title role in the Janice Honeyman pantomime Peter Pan in the Johannesburg Civic Theatre, where a run of 81 shows were performed. In 2012 he was once again seen in the title role of Dawid Die Musical in the Pretoria State Theatre.

His second album, Ek en Jy, was nominated for a Huisgenoot Tempo Award as the Best Afrikaans Pop Album in 2009, as well as for a South African Music Award (SAMA) as the Best Afrikaans Pop Album in 2010. Over the last four years, Dewald had several number one hits on radio stations all over South Africa, including his big hit Lekker Kry. He performed several times on Huisgenoot Skouspel in 2007, 2012 and 2013.

Dewald has his own production company and produces several high-profile music concerts since 2013. He also completed his honours in Psychology at the University of the Free State in 2014.

== Discography ==
Albums

1. In Jou Oë (4 December 2006)
2. Ek en Jy (February 2009)

Singles

1. Idol
2. In Jou Oë
3. Free to Fly
4. Nog 'n Hart
5. Lekker Kry
6. Liefkry
7. How Does It Feel
8. Valentyn
