= Gareth Cliff =

South African radio and television personality

- Born: 26 August 1977 (age 49); Pretoria, South Africa
- Education: Sutherland High School; University of Pretoria
- Presenting career
- Show: The Gareth Cliff Show
- Station: The Real Network
- Time slot: 6am – 8am
- Style: Talk show
- Country: South Africa
- Previous shows: Presenter on Radio 702; Breakfast show on 5FM CliffCentral.com
- Website: GarethCliff.com; The Real Network

Gareth Rhydal Cliff (born 26 August 1977) is a South African radio and television personality. He began his professional radio career at 702, and later became the host of the breakfast show on 5FM. During his career at 5FM, his show included a feature called The Hollywood Report with Jen Su.

In 2024, Gareth Cliff founded The Real Network and assumed the role of CEO utilising the social media assets of his 10-year-old podcasting business, CliffCentral.com, into an innovative media strategy, production, and distribution company. Under his leadership, the company hosted the first-ever live virtual production podcast using Unreal Engine technology. This marked a significant milestone in the media industry, showcasing Gareth Cliff's forward-thinking approach and solidifying his reputation as a powerhouse in the media and advertising world.

In January 2016 he won a court case to be reinstated as a judge on the television music competition show Idols South Africa on M-Net after being suspended for posting an allegedly racist remark on Twitter.

== CliffCentral ==
In 2014, he launched CliffCentral.com with broadcasting veteran Rina Broomberg, an online content hub that specialises in podcasting and online radio. The content is uncensored and free from the regulations of the Broadcasting Complaints Commission of South Africa (BCCSA). His former 5FM breakfast team, Leigh-Ann Mol, Damon Kalvari and Mabale Moloi joined him in the new venture, and initially featured as part of his team on The Gareth Cliff Show. During one of the more outrageous stunts on CliffCentral, a show called SexTalk featured an orgasm live on air, on 31 July 2017 on National Orgasm Day. On 24 July 2019, Gareth Cliff hosted a panel of well-known South African broadcast personalities featuring DJ Fresh, DJ Sbu, Robert Marawa, Tbo Touch and Trevor Gumbi on Pure Conversations.

Blind History - a podcast series produced by CliffCentral and hosted by Gareth Cliff and Anthony Mederer — was nominated for a New York Festivals Radio Award in 2019 for Best Education podcast.

On 24 October 2021, Nando's had terminated their sponsorship (after 5 years) of Cliff's show, The Burning Platform, broadcast on CliffCentral with immediate effect following outrage over comments made by Gareth Cliff as host. Cliff described Mudzuli Rakhivhane's (member of One South Africa Movement) experiences of racism as "anecdotal" and "unimportant". Cliff had failed to provide a platform for free speech, talked over Rakhivhane, and prevented her from expressing her view sufficiently.

== Other works ==
Cliff wrote an autobiography entitled, Cliffhanger: Confessions of a Shock Jock, published in November 2016.
