= Randall Abrahams =

South African TV presenter

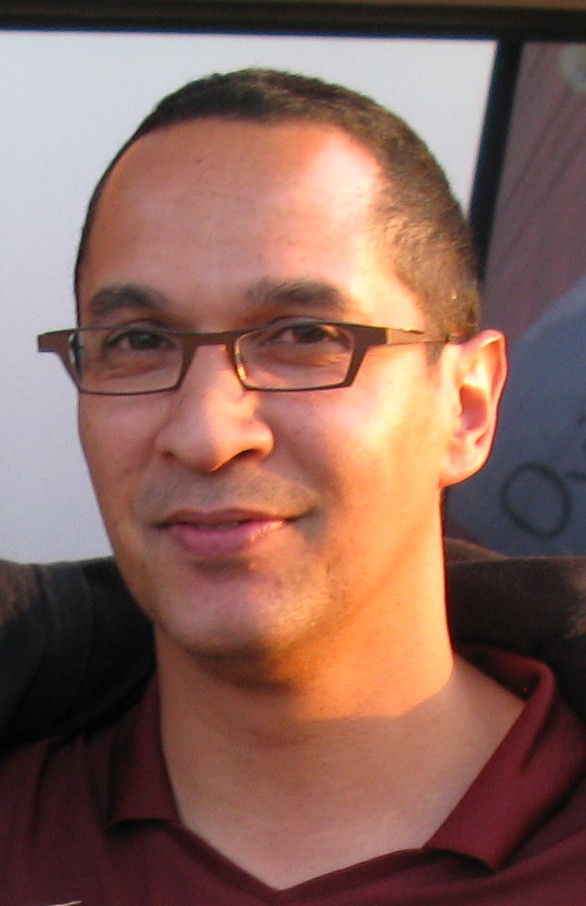
- Born: Randall Abrahams; 26 July 1969 (age 57); Cape Town, Western Cape, South Africa
- Other names: The Bad Judge; Mr. Nasty
- Education: University of Cape Town (BA Hons)
- Occupations: Television presenter; radio presenter; media personality; adjudicator; music executive; businessman; consultant; author
- Years active: 1990–present
- Known for: Idols South Africa; SA's Got Talent
- Television: Idols South Africa; SA's Got Talent
- Presenting career
- Show: Idols SA (2002–2022)
- Network: Mzansi Magic; M-Net (English seasons)
- Time slot: 2:00:00
- Show: SA's Got Talent (judge)
- Network: e.tv; SABC 2
- Time slot: 1:00:00 (incl. commercials)
- Writing career
- Period: 2003
- Subject: Music industry
- Notable work: Spinning around

Randall Abrahams (born 26 July 1969), is a South African TV personality, author and radio presenter best known for adjudicating the Idols South Africa (2002–2022) where he gained the nickname "The Bad Judge". He was with the show for the first 17 seasons.

In February 2022 the producers of Idols South Africa released a statement saying that Abrahams would not return as a judge.

In May 2022 Abrahams was appointed as the chief executive officer of Primedia Broadcasting, but resigned in August 2023 to take up a new position as a group executive for digital solutions at Telkom South Africa.

Abrahams also served as a managing director for the Universal Music Group in South Africa.
