= DJ Sliqe =

South African DJ and record producer

Sliqe
- Born: Lutendo Kungoane; Jo'burg, South Africa
- Occupations: DJ; record producer
- Years active: ?.–present
- Notable work: "Do Like I Do"
- Awards: South African Music Awards (Best Remix. 2016)
- Musical career
- Also known as: Sliqe
- Genre: Hip hop music
- Instruments: DAW; Sample; FL Studio
- Labels: Kennel Music; Sony Music South Africa
- Website: instagram.com/sliqe

Lutendo Kungoane, is a South African DJ and record producer professionally known as DJ Sliqe (or simply Sliqe), he came to prominence subsequent to the release of his single "Do Like I Do" featuring Kwesta and Flabba of Skwatta Kamp.

On the 4th of June 2016 he won a South African Music Award (SAMA) for the Best Remix Category with his single "Do Like I Do (Remix)" featuring L-Tido, Riky Rick, Kwesta, Nadia Nakai, Reason and the late Flabba. He was the first local hip-hop DJ to win such an award.

In 2020, Kungoane was named head of Hip Hop and R&B at Sony Music Entertainment South Africa.

In 2020 Sliqe put out a collaborative album titled Champion Music with Maglera and 25k, the trio once again release a sequel collaborative album titled Champion Music 2 through Kennel Music under exclusive license from Sony Music Entertainment Africa.

== Awards and nominations ==
Year	Award ceremony	Prize	Recipient/Nominated work	Results	Ref.
2016	SAMA	Best Remix	"Do Like I Do (Remix)"	Won	
	SAHHA	Best Mixtape	Inja Yam' (Vol. 1)	Won	
