= Dave van Vuuren =

- Born: 30 June 1990 (age 36)
- Origin: Westville, KwaZulu-Natal, South Africa
- Genres: Rock, indie
- Occupation: Singer
- Instruments: Vocals, guitar
- Years active: 2011–present

Dave van Vuuren (born 30 June 1990) is a South African singer-songwriter and guitarist from Westville near Durban. He first gained popularity through winning the seventh season of Idols South Africa after a close public vote in the finale held on 4 October 2011, with Van Vuuren getting 50.49% of the votes, against 49.51% for the other finalist and eventual runner-up Mark Haze. He was the first series winner who came back after landing in the bottom 3 in an earlier performance.

== Before Idols ==
David fronted a South African underground Metal-Core band called Freedom for Your Life.

== Idols controversy ==
Unable to embrace the pop star mould, and unsettled by the post-Idols album he had to record, he soon went his own way. David was invited to perform on the finale of the eighth season of Idols as is a tradition when the new Idols winner gets announced. In a move to try and shake the Idols image, and as a rebellious act against his label, David and his band Free the Animals went on live national television before Khaya Mthethwa was announced the winner of the new season and performed an original, Progressive Rock song called "Feels Like the Ocean" which spanned 6 minutes.

David and his band had rehearsed with the Idols production team two days prior with a different song chosen by the label. Without telling a soul, they went on stage and wreaked Rock n' Roll havoc upon the stage in front of a live television audience. The video of the performance was completely removed off the internet the next day by M-Net, but over 3 million people saw it that night on live TV.

== After Idols ==
After releasing a compulsory, post-Idols record through Universal Music, he then toured Southern Africa extensively as a solo acoustic artist, releasing an independent, fully original and self-funded folk EP, entitled "The Raging Sea" in the process.

David has since gone on to form a critically acclaimed Rock band called Southern Wild. They have played at some of Southern Africa's most prestigious festivals including Oppikoppi, Rocking The Daisies, Up The Creek, and STRAB. They were chosen as one of four Deezer Next artists for South Africa in 2017 and released their debut album a few weeks later in May. The album is titled, "Lead Role in a Classic Horror". It was recorded by Raiven Hunter at Popsicle Studios in Woodstock, Cape Town and has gone on to be streamed over 1,000,000 times on Deezer, in countries such as Germany, the United Kingdom, the United States of America, Brazil, France, Australia and South Africa.

Since opening for Incubus on their '8' world tour and supporting The Cure in South Africa, Southern Wild has signed with Bellville Records. The label is tied to the renowned Bellville Studios, owned by Theo Crous (Springbok Nude Girls, Kobus!). Having produced staple South African acts like Karen Zoid and Fokofpolisiekar, the studio is now home to the band as they record their second album.

== Personal life ==
Van Vuuren has been married to his wife, Jessica, since 8 March 2013.

== Discography ==
=== Singles ===
- 2011: "Hall of Mirrors"
- 2017: "Time Eraser"
- 2017: "Lead Role"
- 2017: "In a Classic Horror"

=== Albums ===
- 2011: Free The Animals
- 2013: The Raging Sea EP
- 2017: Lead Role in a Classic Horror

Track listing

- Disc 1:

Track 1 – You Will Leave A Mark 3:26

Track 2 – Hall of Mirrors 3:47

Track 3 – Utopia (Find Me) 3:52

Track 4 – Lovers Fight to the End 3:40

Track 5 – Killing The Innocence 3:15

Track 6 – Soul Boy 4:38

Track 7 – Amazing 3:18

Track 8 – Troublesome Mind 3:19

Track 9 – Never Say Never 3:49

Track 10 – If We Don't Fear 4:12

Track 11 – Streets of Philadelphia 3:44

- Disc 2:

Track 1 – Vincent 2:44

Track 2 – The Blower's Daughter 3:48

Track 3 – Day Old Hate 3:58

Track 4 – Cowgirl in the Sand 3:43

Track 5 – I Shall Be Released 2:41

Track 6 – Swing Low, Sweet Chariot 2:53

- 2017: Southern Wild, Lead Role in a Classic Horror

Track listing

Track 1 – Intro (The People)

Track 2 – The People

Track 3 – Time Eraser

Track 4 – Lead Role

Track 5 – In a Classic Horror

Track 6 – Darkness at My Heels (Live in Studio)

Track 7 – I'm So Happy I Could Die

Track 8 – Dirt Horse

Track 9 – Emotion Electric Love

Track 10 – Feels Like The Ocean
