= As Long as You Love Me (Caleb Johnson song) =

2014 single by Caleb Johnson

Single by Caleb Johnson

from the album Testify
- Released: May 2014
- Recorded: 2014
- Genre: Rock
- Label: 19
- Songwriter: Justin Hawkins
- Producer: Howard Benson

Caleb Johnson singles chronology
"As Long as You Love Me" (2014)	"Only One" (2014)

"As Long as You Love Me" is the debut and coronation song for American rock singer and American Idol thirteenth season winner, Caleb Johnson. The song was written by The Darkness frontman Justin Hawkins in 2010 and served as a bonus track from Johnson's debut album, Testify. The song failed to chart on the Billboard Hot 100 making it the first American Idol winner's single to do so.

== Background ==
"As Long as You Love Me"

Song by Mark Haze

from the album Where Angels Fear to Fly
- Released: 2012
- Recorded: 2012
- Length: 3:10
- Label: Universal Music South Africa
- Songwriter: Justin Hawkins
- Producer: Theo Crous

It was originally recorded in 2012 by an Idols South Africa finalist and seventh season runner-up Mark Haze, appearing on his debut album Where Angels Fear to Fly in 2012 It was produced by Theo Crous and released on Universal Music South Africa. although his recording of the song was never released in the United States.

Original American Idol winner, Kelly Clarkson also wanted the song, but was not able to record it in time and the license was granted to Caleb Johnson who laid down the track as his own winning song. Back in 2012, Hawkins told Yahoo Music, "I think she liked it," "Kelly Clarkson had a song [of mine] on hold, but unfortunately, within the lyrics, it talks about my mustache. So it needs a slight rewrite. She liked the tune, but I'm not sure if she was really feeling the subject matter." "The song was considered by Kelly, but ultimately 'unexploited', as we say in songwriting world."

== Chart performance ==
The song debuted at No. 41 on the Hot Rock Songs chart and No. 26 on the Rock Digital Songs chart. The song sold 10,000 copies in the US in its debut week.
