= Atteridgeville =

Atteridgeville Phelindaba
- Location within Gauteng Location within South Africa Location within Africa
- Coordinates: 25°46′24″S 28°04′17″E
- Country: South Africa
- Province: Gauteng
- Municipality: City of Tshwane
- Established: 1939
  - Councillor: (DA)

Area
  - Total: 9.84 km^{2} (3.80 sq mi)

Population (2011)
  - Total: 64,425
  - Density: 6,550/km^{2} (17,000/sq mi)

Racial makeup (2011)
  - Black African: 99.1%
  - Coloured: 0.3%
  - Indian/Asian: 0.1%
  - White: 0.2%
  - Other: 0.3%

First languages (2011)
  - Northern Sotho: 28.4%
  - Tsonga: 16.7%
  - Tswana: 12.3%
  - Zulu: 20.2%
- Time zone: UTC+2 (SAST)
- Postal code (street): 0008
- PO box: 0006
- Area code: 012

Atteridgeville, also known as Phelindaba, is a township located to the west of Pretoria, South Africa. The township was established in 1939 and is named after Mrs MP Atteridge (1900-1979), chairwoman of the Committee for Non-European Affairs on the Pretoria City Council at the time. The Lucas Masterpieces Moripe Stadium is located in Atteridgeville.

== History ==
=== Early years ===
Atteridgeville was established by the government in 1939 as a settlement for black people, after much lobbying by Mrs Myrtle Patricia Atteridge, the chairwoman of the Committee for Non-European Affairs on the City Council at that time. Atteridgeville was established nine years prior to the election of the apartheid government in 1948. The first occupants were moved to Atteridgeville from Marabastad on 26 May 1940. It was officially opened on 5 August 1940. Mrs Atteridge, who was also a philanthropist, Black Sash activist and the deputy mayoress of Pretoria, endeavoured to improve living conditions of black people who were previously living in squalid conditions in Marabastad. Atteridgeville provided amenities such as brick housing, lighting and toilets, and later, so as to further enhance living standards, the township was connected by train to Pretoria CBD. Schools, creches and clinics were established thereafter. The naming of the township was in fact suggested by the black people themselves who also requested Mrs Atteridge to represent them in parliament which she refused as she was disinclined to participate in an exclusionary regime. Between 1940 and 1949, more than 1500 houses were built for people relocated from Marabastad, Bantule, Lady Selbourne, Newclare, Mooiplaas and other areas around Pretoria.

=== Apartheid era ===
Development was frozen between 1968 and 1978 in accordance with the government's policy that housing provided for black people be limited to the homelands. In 1984, Atteridgeville was granted municipal status.

1984 saw school boycotts and general unrest when demands by the Congress of South African Students to implement democratic students' representative councils in schools were rejected by the Department of Education and Training. The first victim of the school boycotts was Emma Sathekge from David Helen Peta High School. The schools were suspended for the better part of 1984 and exams were not written by all High school learners.

On 15 April 1988, a bomb explosion caused damage to the Atteridgeville Municipal buildings; no-one was injured during the attack. The attack was planned by Umkhonto we Sizwe and executed by one of their members, Johannes Maleka. In November 2000, Johannes Maleka was granted amnesty for his part in the attack by the Truth and Reconciliation Commission.

== Demographics ==
Atteridgeville is a diverse township, the residents of which speak many languages. According to the 2011 census, the most commonly spoken formal languages are Sepedi and Tswana. A mixture of languages such as Afrikaans, Setswana, English, and Sepedi are sometimes fused together to form what is now a unique language style of the township with a slight inclination to slang known as Tsotsitaal or siPitori.

== Neighborhoods ==
- Oudstad
- Coldberg
- Block Marabi
- Matebeleng
- 10 Morgan
- Deep Six
- Mazakhele
- Ghost Town
- Tlhalampya
- Kalafong Heights
- Extension 17
- Moroe Extension

Saulsville Neighborhoods

- Blackrock
- Selbourne Side
- Extension 6
- Extension 7
- Hostell Section
- Mshongoville
- Extension 4

== Healthcare ==
Kalafong Hospital is the only hospital in Atteridgeville. The hospital was founded in 1973. The hospital has partnership with University of Pretoria faculty of Health. Atteridgeville clinic is at the border of Oudstad and Coldberg neighborhood. Saulsville residents are served by Saulsville Clinic in Blackrock Neighborhood. Selbourne Side is served by Bophelong Clinic. Saulsville informal settlement Mshongoville is served by Gazankulu Clinic and Phomolong Clinic.

== Transport ==
Taxi is the most common and convenient transport service for the township. Residents of Atteridgeville are served by Atteridgeville Saulsville Taxi Owners' Association. Phomolong Taxi Rank serve as the sole taxi rank for Atteridgeville and Saulsville. The Association has taxis traveling to Menlyn, Centurion, Pretoria CBD, Hartbeespoort, Midrand, and Sunderland Ridge.

Atteridgeville Bus Service, is the township bus operator with its bus terminus located in Saulsville. The bus terminus is located between Blackrock neighborhood and Selbourne Side.

== Economy ==
Atteridgeville biggest investor is Safari Investments. The company own 3 Malls in Atteridgeville. The company operates Atlyn Mall, Mnandi Mall, formerly known as Maunde Mall and Nkomo Village. Mccormick Property Development operates Atteridge Stadium Center.

== War memorial ==
The Mendi Memorial is a war memorial dedicated to over 600 black South African soldiers who died when the British vessel SS Mendi sank after a tragic collision in 1917, during the First World War. The memorial was unveiled on 24 March 1996. The memorial consists of the upper half of a soldier holding onto a ship's railing with the other hand extended towards the sky.

The memorial is located at the 'Ga-mothakga Resort 'on the corner of Pitse and Tlou Streets.

== Notable people ==
- 25K, rapper and songwriter
- Sydney Maree (born 1956), a middle-distance athlete
- Sello Maake Ka-Ncube (born 1960), film and television actor
- Jeff Masemola, anti-apartheid activist, teacher, and founder of the armed wing of the Pan Africanist Congress (PAC)
- Dikgang Moseneke, former Robben Island prisoner, ex-vice-president of the PAC and retired deputy Chief Justice
- Solly Msimanga, former mayor of Pretoria (2016–2019)
- Tutu Puoane (born 1979), jazz musician
- Gwen Ramokgopa, politician and former mayor of Pretoria (2005–2010)
- Kgosientso Ramokgopa, Politician and former mayor of Pretoria (2012–2016)
- Thato Saul, rapper and songwriter
- Elias Xitavhudzi, serial killer
- Paul Mashatile, Deputy President of Republic of South Africa
- Mpetjane Kgaogelo Lekgoro, Politician and Diplomat
- Seputla Sebogodi, Actor

== See also ==
- SS Mendi
- Pretoria Sotho
