= Mass Country =

MASS COUNTRY

Studio album by AKA
- Released: 24 February 2023
- Genre: Hip hop; dance
- Length: 54:30
- Label: SME Africa; Vth A
- Producer: Kiernan Jarryd Forbes (also exec.); Tshupo Benjamin Khutsoane; Christer Mofenyi Kobedi; Fundile Dlamini; Oriah Tshepo Phalane; Thabo Tota; Ayoola Oladapo Agboola; Nivo

AKA chronology
Touch My Blood (2018)	MASS COUNTRY (2023)

Singles from Mass Country
- 1. "Lemons (Lemonade)" Released: 16 September 2022; 2. "Paradise" Released: 23 November 2022; 3. "Prada" Released: 20 January 2023; 4. "Company" Released: 17 February 2023

Mass Country (stylized MASS COUNTRY), is the fourth studio album by South African rapper AKA. It was released posthumously by Sony Music Entertainment Africa and Vth A on 24 February 2023. It was preceded by four singles "Lemons (Lemonade)", "Prada", "Paradise", and "Company", with guest appearances from Nasty C, KDDO, Thato Saul, Khuli Chana, Blxckie, Gyakie, Nadia Nakai, Sjava and others.

== Background and promotion ==
It is the final album recorded by AKA shortly before he was murdered in February 2023. The album was promoted on the rapper's official Instagram account hours before his shooting. The album's lead single, "Lemons (Lemonade)", received positive reactions from the likes of American record producers Swizz Beatz and Diplo. Spotify honored AKA by displaying a billboard of the album in Times Square, New York.

Sony Music Africa manager, Caroline Morabe, stated that AKA left unreleased music behind and they plan on releasing a special edition of Mass Country.

"You know Kiernan in studio, he brought a whole bunch of songs and we can't release everything at once, so he left us some serious magic and we're very excited later on in the year to have the 'Mass Country Deluxe' coming out"

–Caroline Morabe

== Commercial performance ==
The album surpassed 10 million streams on Spotify in less than 8 hours, becoming his most streamed album. Mass Country was certified Gold by the Recording Industry of South Africa (RiSA) two weeks after its release, and later Platinum. Sony Music Africa hosted a private brunch to celebrate the milestone and announced that the posthumous album surpassed 35,404 album-equivalent units, which is equivalent to 40,972,588 streams in South Africa alone.

== Artwork ==
AKA revealed the album's artwork on 11 January 2023, on his Instagram account. The artwork was designed by South African illustrator Karabo Poppy. It shows the face of AKA surrounded by objects which represent South African Culture, like a 10-cent coin, an old BMW, a skull, and a snake.

== Title ==
In an interview with Slikour, AKA revealed that the album's title is inspired by a South African cultural music genre called Maskandi, citing that the title "MASS COUNTRY" sounds like "Maskandi", blending the genre with hip hop music and country music.

Thus the link between the title of the album and its artwork are about South African Culture, as particular objects that represent the culture appear.

== Track listing ==
Mass Country track listing adapted from Apple Music.
No.	Title	Producer(s)	Length
1.	"Last Time"	Zadok	3:33
2.	"Mbuzi (Freestyle)" (featuring Thato Saul)	031Choppa; Christer; FD	5:14
3.	"Crown" (with Emtee featuring Manana)	Christer; FD	3:47
4.	"Lemons (Lemonade)" (with Nasty C)	Christer; FD; Oriah; Zadok	4:20
5.	"Prada" (with Khuli Chana)	Christer	2:56
6.	"Sponono" (with Sjava featuring 031 Choppa, Baby S.O.N)	031Choppa; FD; Zadok	4:14
7.	"Company" (with KDDO)	KDDO	4:05
8.	"Paradise" (with Musa Keys, Gyakie)	Christer; FD; Oriah; Zadok	3:25
9.	"Ease" (with Blxckie, Yanga Chief)	Christer	4:18
10.	"Amapiano" (featuring Weathrd, Laylizzy)	Christer	3:49
11.	"Dangerous" (with Blxckie featuring Nadia Nakai)	031Choppa; Christer; FD; Zadok	3:44
12.	"Everest"	Christer	3:08
13.	"Diary (Anxiety)"	Thabo	4:41
14.	"Army (Bonus)"	Thabo	3:21
Total length:			54:00

- "Amapiano" samples "Sister Bettina" and "Mas Que Nada"

== Awards and nominations ==
AKA came out as the most nominated individual in 2023 leading the nomination list of the South African Music Awards (SAMAs) with seven nominations, of which four categories namely Album of the Year, Male Artist of the Year, Best Hip Hop Album, and Best Engineered Album he scored amid the success of MASS COUNTRY.

List of Accolades
Award / Music Festival	Year	Recipient	Nomination	Result	Ref.
Metro FM Music Awards	2023	Mass Country	Best Hip Hop Artist	Won	
South African Music Awards	2023	Mass Country	Male Artist of the Year	Won	
South African Music Awards	2023	Mass Country	Album of the Year	Nominated	
South African Music Awards	2023	Mass Country	Best Engineered Album	Won	
South African Music Awards	2023	Mass Country	Best Hip Hop Album	Nominated	

== Certifications and sales ==
Region	Certification	Certified units/sales
South Africa (RISA)	Gold	35,404

== Release history ==
Release dates and formats for Mass Country
Region	Date	Format(s)	Edition(s)	Label	Ref.
Worldwide	24 February 2023	Digital download; streaming	Standard	Sony; Vth A	
