= 17th Metro FM Music Awards =

Award ceremony

Metro FM Music Awards
- 17th annual Metro FM Music Awards
- Sponsored by: Metro FM
- Date: 6 May 2023; 3 years ago
- Venue: Mbombela Stadium, Mpumalanga
- Country: South Africa
- Hosted by: Lerato Kganyago; Katleho Maboe

Highlights
- Most awards: AKA (4)
- Most nominations: K.O (7)
- Website: https://www.metrofmmusicawards.co.za

Television/radio coverage
- Network: SABC1

The 2023 Metro FM Music Awards is the 17th annual ceremony of the Metro FM Music Awards, the ceremony was sponsored by Metro FM and premiered live on SABC1 on 6 May 2023 at Mbombela Stadium in Mbombela, Mpumalanga, South Africa.

Rapper K.O led the nomination list with seven nominations followed by rappers Sjava and the late AKA with six nominations each.

== Winners and nominees ==
Below is the full list of nominees and winners. Winners listed first bold.

| Song of the Year | Best Afrosoul Pop |
|---|---|
| Betusile Mcinga – "Ngena Noah"; K.O – "SETE"; AKA – "Lemons (Lemonade)"; Konke & Musa Keys – "Kancane"; Aymos – "Fatela"; Big Nuz – "Ngeke"; Kabza De Small – "Khusela"; Gaba Cannal – "Healer Ntlizivo Yam"; Sjava – "Isoka"; Wanitwa Mos – "Sofa Silahlane" | Zuko SA – "Andikalibali"; Sjava – Isibuko; Brenda Mtambo – "Enza Kwenzeke"; Inkabi Nation – "Voicemail"; Mlindo The Vocalist – Lindokuhle |
| Best Amapiano Song | Artist of the Year |
| Deep London – "Hamba Wena"; Gaba Cannal – "Healer Ntliziyo Yam"; Kabza De Small – "Khusela"; Daliwonga – "Abo Mvelo"; Wanitwa Mos – "Sofa Silahlane" | AKA – "Lemons (Lemonade)"; K.O – "Sete"; Wanitwa Mos – "Sofa Silahlane"; Nomfundo Moh – "Izibusiso"; Sjava – "Isoka" |
| Best Jazz Album | Best New Age R&B Artist |
| Nduduzo Makhathini – In the Spirit of Ntu; Linda Sikhakhane – Isambulo; Spartz – Awake | MOE. – "Me Ever After"; Manana – "Patiently"; ThandoNie – "Our Story: Untold"; Venom & Shishiliza – "uthando"; Zädok – "Othanda Mina" |
| Best Collaboration Song | Best Duo or Group |
| AKA ft. Nasty C – "Lemons (Lemonade)"; K.O ft. Young Stunna & Blxckie – "Sete"; Aymos ft. Ami Faku – "Fatela"; Sjava ft. Q Twins & Mzukulu – ‘Isoka’ | Inkabi Nation – "Voice Mail"; Mafikizolo featuring Sun-El Musician & Kenza– "Kwanele"; Big Nuz – "Ngeke"; Mellow & Sleazy – ‘Wenza Kanjani’; Kwesta and Kabza De Small – "Mrholo Wayizolo" |
| Best Female Artist | Best Gospel Album |
| Makhadzi – African Queen 2.0; Nomfundo Moh – "Izibusiso"; Simmy featuring Msaki – "Hlelo"; Brenda Mtambo – "Enza Kwenzeke"; HLE – "You're The Worthy One" | Pastor Lungi Ndala – Victorious Praise; Dumi Mkokstad – The Over Flow; Soweto Gospel Choir – Hope; Khava Mthethwa – Art & Worship; Kingdmusic – Perfect Love |
| Best Hip Hop Artist | Best House Song |
| AKA – Mass Country; K.O – SR3; Nasty C – Ivyson Army Tour Mixtape; Blxckie – The4Mula; Maglera Doe Boy – Diaspora | Skye Wanda – "Amazwi"; Kususa, Argento Dust & Zakes Bantwini – "Asanda"; Mthandazo Gatya ft. Nhlonipho – "Sizobambana"; Karyendasoul ft. Ami Faku – "Umthandazo"; Caiiro ft. Pixie L – "Lwandle" |
| Best Kwaito/Gqom Song | Best Male Artist |
| DJ Tira – "Sikilidi"; Big Nuz – "Ngeke"; Kwesta and Kabza De Small – "Mrholo Wayizolo"; Spikiri – "Tana LA"; Professor – ‘Ezangakini’ | AKA – "Lemons (Lemonade)"; K.O – "SETE"; Kabza De Small – "Khusela"; Sjava – "Isoka"; Mthandazo Gatya – "Sizobambana" |
| New Artist | Styled Artist |
| Coco SA – "I Never Thought"; Oufadafada – ‘I can’t Give Up’; Group Chat – "Mama"; Mayten – "Wait On Me"; Tee Tee – "Andizenzi" | Musa Keys; Mafikizolo; Sjava; Daliwonga; Sino Msolo |
| Best Music Video | Best Viral Challenge |
| DJ Tira – "Sikilidi"; K.O – "SETE"; АКА – "Lemons (Lemonade)"; Wanitwa Mos – "Sofa Silahlane"; Costa Titch – "Big Flexa" (Remix) | Deep London ft. Boohle – "Hamba Wena"; DJ Maphorisa & Visca – "Ba Straata"; Felo Le Tee & Toss – "Manca"; Myztro ft. Focalistic, Daliwonga, Shaunmusiq, Ftears – "Tobetsa"; K.O. ft Young Stunna and Blxckie – "SETE" |
