= Floral Park (disambiguation) =

Floral Park is an incorporated village on Long Island, New York, United States.

Floral Park may also refer to:

- Floral Park (LIRR station), a Long Island Rail Road train station
- Floral Park, Queens, a neighborhood in New York City
- Floral Park, Ontario, a community in Ontario, Canada
- Floral Park (Hato Rey), a sector in San Juan, Puerto Rico

== See also ==
- Flora Park, suburb in Polokwane, South Africa
