= Lavish Worship =

Studio album by Ntokozo Mbambo
- Released: 21 March 2023
- Genre: Gospel
- Length: 60:22
- Label: Koko

Ntokozo Mbambo chronology
The Anniversary Project (2018)	Lavish Worship (2023)

Lavish Worship is the sixth studio album by South African singer-songwriter Ntokozo Mbambo, released through Koko Records on 21 March 2023.

== Track listing ==
Lavish Worship track listing
No.	Title	Length
1.	"Ngcwele Nkosi"	4:51
2.	"Makabongwe"	5:30
3.	"Jesus Christ Is Lord"	5:29
4.	"Majesty"	5:08
5.	"God Still" (featuring Mabong)	3:48
6.	"Hhay' Angimbonanga"	4:21
7.	"Your Glory (Have Your Way)"	4:37
8.	"Fill Us Again"	7:23
9.	"Ufanelw' Udumo"	4:53
10.	"uyiNkosi yamaKhosi"	3:46
11.	"Ohh Lord We Praise Your Name"	4:28
12.	"Thula Interlude"	2:04
13.	"Thank You Lord" (featuring Khaya Mthethwa)	3:20
14.	"With You Always"	4:46
15.	"I Will Sing"	4:04
16.	"If I Be Lifted"	4:49
17.	"Ikherubi"	4:15
18.	"Imisebenzi Yakho"	5:43
Total length:		60:22

== Accolades ==
Lavish Worship won Album of the Year, Best Contemporary Faith Album of the Year, and Female Artist of the Year at the 29th ceremony of South African Music Awards. In addition at the 18th ceremony of Metro FM Music Awards Lavish Worship, was nominated for Best Female and won Best Gospel Album.

Year	Nominee / work	Award	Result
2023	Lavish Worship	Album of the Year	Won
2023	Lavish Worship	Best Contemporary Faith Album of the Year	Won
2023	Lavish Worship	Female Artist of the Year	Won
2024	Lavish Worship	Best Gospel Album	Won
2024	Lavish Worship	Best Female	Nominated

== Release history ==
Release dates and formats for Lavish Worship
Region	Date	Format(s)	Label	Ref.
Various	21 March 2023	Digital download; streaming	Koko Records	
