= HLE =

HLE or hle may refer to:

== Transportation ==
- Heiligerlee railway stop (Station code Hle), the Netherlands
- Hillington East railway station (Station code HLE), Scotland
- Saint Helena Airport (IATA airport code), Saint Helena

== Science and technology ==
- Hardware Lock Elision, part of Intel's Transactional Synchronization Extensions
- High-level emulation, an emulator for the Nintendo 64
- Humanity's Last Exam, a language model benchmark

== Other uses ==
- Harold Lloyd Entertainment
- Hanwha Life Esports, a South Korean eSports organization
- HLE (singer), stage name of South African gospel singer Hlengiwe Ntombela
- Hlersu language (ISO 639-3 code), spoken in China
- Holy Land Experience, a theme park in Orlando, Florida, US
- Hong Kong Higher Level Examination, a standardized examination from 1979 to 1992
