= Never Ride =

2022 single by Mashbeatz

Single by Mashbeatz featuring Maglera Doe Boy & Thato Saul

from the album THIS IS RELIGION
- Released: 6 May 2022
- Genre: Hip hop
- Length: 2:26
- Label: OuttaThisWorld
- Songwriter(s): Nhlawulo Mashimbyi; Thato Matlebyane
- Composer(s): Mashbeatz
- Lyricist(s): Tokelo Moyakhe
- Producer(s): Mashbeatz

Music video
- "Never Ride (Visualizer)" on YouTube

Audio sample
- A 19-seconds sample of "Never Ride": file; help

"Never Ride" is a hip hop single by South African producer Mashbeatz from his third studio album THIS IS RELIGION. The single features Maglera Doe Boy and Thato Saul. It became a sleeper hit, going viral on a video sharing platform TikTok a week after its release.

== Commercial performance ==
Following the single going viral the song was featured on Spotify commercials, the visualizer surpassed 1 million views on YouTube in a month, which led fans debating over the song should have a remix or not, and so Mashbeatz felt that it was adequate to release the remix of the song.

== Charts ==
Chart performance for "Never Ride"
Chart (2022)	Peak position
South Africa (RiSA)	7

== Awards and nominations ==
Year	Award ceremony	Category	Recipient/Nominated work	Results	Ref.
2022	11th South African Hip Hop Awards	Best remix	"Never Ride Remix"	Won	
2022	11th South African Hip Hop Awards	Song of the Year	"Never Ride"	Nominated	
2022	11th South African Hip Hop Awards	Best Collabo	"Never Ride"	Nominated	

== Remix ==
"Never Ride (Remix)"

Remix by Mashbeatz featuring 25K, Anzo, Buzzi Lee, LucasRaps, Maglera Doe Boy, Roii, Saudi, Sjava, Thato Saul, YoungstaCPT & Wordz.

from the album THIS IS RELIGION
- Released: 9 September 2022
- Genre: Hip hop
- Length: 6:20
- Label: OuttaThisWorld
- Songwriter(s): Mashbeatz; Nhlawulo Mashimbyi; Thato Matlebyane; Tokelo Moyakhe; Andile Ngubeni; Anele Mbisha; Bontle Makhwelo; Danisile Baloyi; Jabulani Makhubo; Lehlogonolo Molefe; Luke Duncan Malong; Oratile Kgotso Kgobe; Riyadh Roberts
- Producer(s): Mashbeatz

Mashbeatz chronology
"Never Ride" (2022)	"Never Ride (Remix)" (2022)

LucasRaps chronology
Not the Same (2022)	Never Ride (Remix) (2022)

Music video
- "Never Ride Remix (Official video)" on YouTube

Official audio
- "Never Ride (Remix)[Official audio]" on YouTube

On the 9th of September 2022, the anticipated remix of "Never Ride" from the producer Mashbeatz was released through digital platforms with its music video premiering the same day on YouTube. The remix features vocals from 25K, Anzo, Buzzi Lee, LucasRaps, Maglera Doe Boy, Roii, Saudi, Sjava, Thato Saul, YoungstaCPT & Wordz.
