= Pretoria Chinese School =

School in Pretoria, South Africa

Pretoria Chinese School is a school in Wingate Park, Eastern Pretoria, established in 1934.

== History ==
In order to preserve their culture and provide quality education for their children, the Young Chinese Cultural league and the Chinese Community of Pretoria established the Pretoria Chinese School in downtown Pretoria in 1934.

In 1993 the school was relocated to the Eastern Pretoria suburb of Wingate Park, with new school facilities including a laboratory and 27 classrooms.

The relocated school initially offered Grades 1–9, but with each subsequent year expanded their offering such that in 1996 they were able to offer Grades 1–12, thus celebrating their first class of matriculants in 1996.

== School life ==
The school's motto is Labour and Persevere, and the education has a strong focus on discipline. Beyond studies in Chinese language and culture, the school provides a rich array of sport and cultural activities. The PCS follows the Independent Education Board curriculum.

The majority of classes are taught in English, with only the advanced Languages being taught in the respective language, such as Afrikaans, Xhosa or Mandarin.

Facilities include 2 basketball/tennis courts, computer labs, cricket turf, swimming pool, athletics field, and tuckshop.

Cultural activities include visits to the Nan Hua Temple in Bronkhorstspruit, celebrating Chinese New Year, mau pi also known as Chinese calligraphy, the creation of traditional Chinese foods such as dumpling, and engaging in Chinese board games such as Xiangqi, Go (game) and Mahjong.

== Notable alumni ==
- Motswedi Modiba, singer-songwriter.
