= HLE (singer) =

South African gospel singer

- Born: Hlengiwe Ntombela; 12 April 1991 (age 35); Kwaggafontein, South Africa
- Genres: Gospel; Jazz
- Occupations: Worship Leader; Musician; Musical director; Songwriter; Show Host
- Labels: YKOE; The T Effect; Motown
- Website: http://www.hlelive.com/

Hlengiwe Ntombela (born 12 April 1991), better known as HLE, is a South African gospel singer and songwriter. She is a former member of the gospel choir Joyous Celebration, and currently performs as a solo artist.

== Biography ==
=== Life ===
Ntombela grew up in Newcastle, KwaZulu-Natal, South Africa. Her father is a bishop at Potters House Family Church.

=== Career ===
Ntombela began her career as a backing vocalist for Ntokozo Mbambo. In 2012, she was asked to lead a song with the Joyous Celebration gospel choir, after Khaya Mthethwa was unable to do so because of a commitment to Idols South Africa. She joined the choir afterwards.

Ntombela later left the choir and embarked on a solo career as HLE. She recorded her debut gospel album, titled Your Kingdom on Earth, in 2019. The same year, she was featured on Benjamin Dube's album, Glory in His Presence.

In 2020, HLE released her debut solo single, "Dwala"; it debuted at number one on the iTunes charts. She launched a project, The HOW Project, which centers around the heart of a worshiper. A month later, she released her second debut single, "You Are". HLE released her debut album, Your Kingdom On Earth (Live).

On July 1, 2020, HLE's weekly show titled "Adlib" premiered on One Gospel, Channel 331, DSTv. In this show, Hle hosts South African gospel musicians.

In 2021, HLE hosted a weekly Sunday show titled "VIP Invite" on Mzansi Magic, Channel 161, DSTv. The show was renewed for a second season in 2022.

=== 2022-present: new projects ===
On February 17, was announced that Hle has signed a record deal with Motown Gospel under Capitol Christian Music Group, based in Nashville. She released her debut EP with Motown Gospel titled "Take Heart" in 2023.

In 2025 she released her much-anticipated second album, "The Ground We're On".

== Discography ==
=== Albums ===
- Your Kingdom On Earth (Live)
- The Ground We're On

=== Singles ===
- "You Are Life" (Malak Yaweh, 2018)
- "Dwala (Live)" (YKOE / The T Effect, 2020)
- "You Are (Live)" (YKOE / The T Effect, 2020)
- "Nguwe (Live)" (YKOE / The T Effect, 2020)
- "Kube Kuhle" (2022)

== Awards ==
=== South African Music Awards ===
Year	Nominee / work	Award	Result	Ref.
2021	Herself	Best Female Artist of the Year	Nominated	
2021	Your Kingdom on Earth	Best Contemporary Faith Album	Won	
2021	Your Kingdom on Earth	Best Live Audio Visual Recording of the Year	Nominated	
2023	Herself	Female Arist of the year	Nominated	
2023	Take Heart	Best Contemporary Faith Album	Nominated	
2026	The Ground We're On	Best Contemporary Faith Music Album	Won	
2026	The Ground We're On	Album of the Year	Won	
2026	Herself	Female Artist of the Year	Won	

=== Basadi in Music Awards ===
Year	Nominee / work	Award	Result
2026	Herself	Best Gospel Artist of the Year	Nominated
