= Joyous Celebration =

South African gospel group

- Origin: South Africa
- Genres: Contemporary gospel, Urban gospel, Gospel
- Years active: 1996–2021
- Labels: Sony (former); Universal/Motown(former); Joyous Records
- Past members: Ntokozo Mbambo; Maryjane Matodzi-Mabunda; Mahalia Buchanan; Hle; Swazi Dlamini; Kwazi Shange; Nqubeko Mbatha; Khaya Mthethwa; Ndivhuwo Matumba; Phelo Bala; Uche Agu; Mkhululi Bhebhe

Joyous Celebration were a South African gospel group formed by Mthunzi Namba, Jabu Hlongwane and Lindelani Mkhize in 1994.

Their 9th album Joyous Celebration, Vol. 9 (2005), became their best-selling album and certified 2 × platinum in South Africa. Joyous Celebration's accolades includes: 15 South African Music Awards, 2 Metro FM Music Awards, 2 One Gospel Awards, 2 Crown Gospel Awards and, 1 Africa Gospel Music Award.

== History ==
In the early 1990s, Lindelani Mkhize, Mthunzi Namba and Jabu Hlongwane met each other at a concert in Durban, South Africa and became close friends. With different musical backgrounds and careers, the three friends came together and formed a group called "Family Factory" with different singers. Although Family Factory recorded their own music, the group often sang background vocals for many local and international artists that were touring South Africa.

In their interviews, the former members and founders of the group have shared how they (on one evening) performed at an empty venue in Cape Town with only few people attending their show and the record label, Sony Music Africa (which funded the group), withdrew their support for the group as they viewed the concept of Family Factory as a "waste of time", but they still continued to perform until more people attended their show on the next evening. During this era when traditional gospel music was huge thing in South Africa, Family Factory introduced a contemporary sound that was more Western with more English songs.

During the early 1990s and mid-1990s, there were high tensions in South Africa due to political violence that plagued many communities and due to these turbulent times, many people feared that there would be chaos in South Africa. Luckily, South Africa managed gain independence in a peaceful way. As a result, Family Factory wanted to host an event and a recorded project in 1996 where they would thank God for the country's peaceful transition to democracy and celebrate God's grace and miracle for the freedom that South Africa had finally received. Because they were celebrating joyously, they named that project and event "Joyous Celebration".

In 1997, they released their first album titled "Joyous Celebration". Unlike other Joyous Celebration albums, the first album does not have a number on it because it was meant to be a once-off project but fans were interested in this project and wanted more music. The leaders decided to carry on recording albums each year and the group grew into being one of the most influential in the South African gospel scene.

Although Joyous Celebration looks for uncapped talent to present it to the world, they have also featured well-established artists such as Vuyo Mokoena and Sipho Makhabane. The group caught the attention from the rest of the African continent when they started featuring international former members such as Uche Agu from Nigeria (who sang a popular song "My God is Good") and Mkhululi Bhebhe from Zimbabwe (who sang a popular song "Tambira Jehova").

In early April 2011, they announced My Gift to You Tour with six dates, commenced on 21 April at the State Theatre in Tshwane and concluded in Bloemfontein in August 2011.

Their studio album Joyous Celebration, Vol. 19: Back to the Cross was released on 2 March 2015. The album peaked at No. 1 on Official SA Album Charts for two consecutive weeks. It was certified platinum in South Africa with sales of over 51,271 copies. In addition Joyous Celebration Vol. 19: Back to the Cross won Best Selling DVD at the 22nd ceremony of South African Music Awards.

They embarked on Joyous 22 All for You Tour in 2018, tour included five dates. It commenced on 29 June in Banquet Hall in Middleburg, Mpumalanga, and concluded 20 October in Times Square Arena in Tshwane, Gauteng.

In March 2021, the group signed a recording deal with Universal Music and Motown Gospel in the United States.

Joyous Celebration 25: Still We Rise was released on 26 March 2021. It was supported by two singles: "Ndezel' Uncedo" and "The Victory".

== Discography ==
=== Studio albums ===
- Joyous Celebration (1997)
- Joyous Celebration, Vol. 4: Connecting The Nation (2000)
- Joyous Celebration, Vol.8: To Be Free
- Joyous Celebration, Vol. 6: Be Inspired (2002)
- Joyous Celebration 26: Joy (2022)

=== Live albums ===
- Joyous Celebration Vol. 2: Live in Durban
- Joyous Celebration 3 (Live in Johannesburg at the Market Theatre - Johannesburg, 1999)
- Joyous Celebration 5 (Live in Johannesburg at the Civic Theatre - Johannesburg, 2002)
- Joyous Celebration 7 (Live in Cape town at the Artscape gallery, 2003)
- Joyous Celebration 9 (Live in Playhouse - Durban 2005)
- Joyous Celebration 10 (Live at the Mosiaek Theatre - Johannesburg, 2006)
- Joyous Celebration 11 (Live At The Sun City Superbowl, 2007)
- Joyous Celebration 12 (Live At The Grand West Arena - Cape Town, 2008)
- Joyous Celebration 13 (Live At The Mosaeik Theatre - Johannesburg, 2009)
- Joyous Celebration 14 (Live at Vista Campus - Bloemfontein, 2010)
- Joyous Celebration 15: My Gift (Live At The ICC Arena - Durban, 2011)
- Joyous Celebration 16 (Live at Carnival City - Ekurhuleni, 2012)
- Rewind (Live at Monte Casino, 2012)
- Joyous Celebration 17: Grateful
- Joyous Celebration 18: One Purpose (Live at CityHill Church - Durban, 2014)
- Joyous Celebration, Vol. 19 (Back to the Cross)
- Rewind 2 (Live at Monte Casino, 2015)
- Joyous Celebration Vol. 20 (Live at the Moses Mabhide Stadium, 2016)
- Joyous Celebration 20 - Part 2: The Alumni (Live)
- Joyous Celebration, Vol.21: Heal Our Land (2017)
- Joyous Celebration 22: All For You (Live)
- Joyous Celebration 23 (2019)
- Joyous Celebration 24 - THE ROCK: Live At Sun City - PRAISE (Live At Sun City, 2020)
- Joyous Celebration 24 - THE ROCK: Live At Sun City - WORSHIP (Live At Sun City, 2020)
- Joyous Celebration 25 - Still We Rise (Live At The Joburg Theatre/2021)
- Joyous Celebration 26: Joy (Live At The Joburg Theatre)
- Joyous Celebration 27: Victory (Live At The Emperors Palace / 2023).
- Joyous Celebration 27: Hope (Live At The Emperors Palace / 2023).
- Joyous Celebration 28 (The First Set Live at the Durban Icc)
- Joyous Celebration 28 (The Second Set Live at the Durban Icc)

=== Compilation albums ===
- A Joyous Christmas (2018)

== Achievements ==
=== South African Music Awards ===
Year	Nominee / work	Award	Result	Ref.
2002	Joyous Celebration 5	Best Contemporary Gospel Album	Won	
2003	Joyous Celebration 6	Best Contemporary Gospel Album	Won	
2004	Joyous Celebration 7	Best Contemporary Gospel Album	Won	
2005	Joyous Celebration 8	Best Contemporary Gospel Album	Won	
2008	Joyous Celebration 11	Best Traditional/African Adult Contemporary DVD	Won	
2009	Joyous Celebration 12	Best African Contemporary Gospel Album	Won	
2013	Joyous Celebration 16	Best Selling DVD	Won	
2014	Joyous Celebration 17	Best Selling DVD	Won	
2015	Joyous Celebration 18	Best Selling DVD	Won	
2018	Joyous Celebration	Capasso Best Selling Digital Download Composer's Award	Won	
2018	Joyous Celebration	Best Selling Digital Artist of the Year	Won	
2018	Joyous Celebration Volume 21: Heal Our Land	Best Selling DVD of the Year	Won	
2018	Joyous Celebration Volume 21: Heal Our Land	Best Selling Album of the Year	Won	
2019	Joyous Celebration 22 All for You	Best Selling DVD	Won	
2019	Joyous Celebration - "Umoya kulendawo"	Best Selling Artist	Won	

=== Metro FM Music Awards ===
Year	Nominee / work	Award	Result	Ref.
2000		Best Gospel Album	Won	
2001		Best Gospel Album	Won	

=== Crown Gospel Awards ===
Year	Nominee / work	Award	Result	Ref.
2008	Joyous Celebration	Best Gospel Group	Won	
2009	Joyous Celebration 12	Best Gospel Group	Won	
2009	Joyous Celebration 12	Best DVD	Nominated	
2009	Joyous Celebration 12	Best Praise And Worship	Nominated	

=== One Gospel Awards ===
Year	Nominee / work	Award	Result	Ref.
2007		Gopel Choir Of The Year	Won	
2008		Gopel Choir Of The Year	Won	

=== Africa Gospel Music Awards ===
Year	Nominee / work	Award	Result	Ref.
2013		Best Gospel Event Of The Year	{{nominations	
