= 66 (Felo Le Tee and Myztro song) =

2021 single by Felo Le Tee and Myztro

Single by Felo Le Tee and Myztro
- Released: 22 October 2021
- Genre: Amapiano
- Length: 7:10
- Label: New Money Gang; SME Africa
- Producer(s): Tshiamiso Sekowe; Tsholofelo Mokhine

Felo Le Tee singles chronology
| "Bopha" (2021) | "66" (2021) | "Dipatje Tsa Felo" (2021) |

Myztro singles chronology
| "66" (2021) | "Dipatje Tsa Felo" (2021) |

Music video
- "66 & Dipatje Tsa Felo (Official video)"

Official audio
- "66"

"66" is a single by South African DJs and record producers Felo Le Tee and Myztro, released on 22 October 2021 through New Money Gang under exclusive license from Sony Music Entertainment Africa. A year later it was certified Multi-Platinum by the Recording Industry of South Africa (RiSA).

The song debuted at number 15 on The Local & International Streaming Chart of The Official South African Charts, and peaked at number 3 behind Young Stunna's "Adiwele".

== Charts ==
Chart performance for "66"
| Chart (2021) | Peak position |
|---|---|
| South Africa (TOSAC) | 3 |

== Awards and nominations ==
List of awards and nominations received by "66" and "Dipatje Tsa Felo"
| Year | Award ceremony | Category | Recipient/Nominated work | Results | Ref. |
|---|---|---|---|---|---|
| 2022 | All Africa Music Awards | Best Artiste/Duo/Group in African Electro | "66" & "Dipatje Tsa Felo" | Nominated | |

== Certifications ==
| Region | Certification | Certified units/sales |
|---|---|---|
| South Africa (RISA) | 3× Platinum | 60,000^{‡} |
^{‡} Sales+streaming figures based on certification alone.
