= Khaya Mthethwa =

South African musician

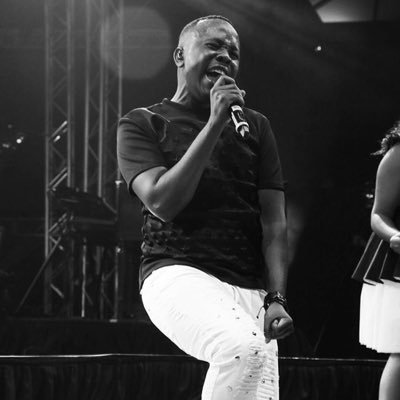
- Khaya Mthethwa on stage
- Born: Khayelihle Nkosinathi Mthethwa; 25 November 1986 (age 39)
- Other name: The PK
- Spouse: Ntandoyenkosi Kunene (m. 2017–2019) Sine Nee Ndlovu (m. 2025)
- Musical career
- Origin: Umlazi, KwaZulu-Natal, South Africa
- Genres: Gospel; R&B; Afro Soul
- Occupations: Singer-songwriter; director; arranger; Producer; Pastor at Oasis Church
- Years active: 2012–present
- Label: Universal Music Group (former)

Khaya Mthethwa (born 25 November 1986) is a South African singer-songwriter, musician, composer, arranger, and a multi-instrumentalist. Prior his solo career, was a choir member of the gospel group Joyous Celebration.

Born and raised in Durban, KwaZulu-Natal, his musical career began as a drummer at the age of 10 in 1997, prior joining a school choir as a singer year after. He is best known for winning the 8th season of TV singing competition Idols South Africa, the first black person to have done so.

His passion for music stems from his strong upbringing and the guidance that he received from his religious parents, pastors Themba and Lulu Mthethwa.

== Early life ==
Born and raised in Durban, Khaya Mthethwa grew up in a church environment. His father Bhekithemba Mthethwa is a minister at the Umlazi Oasis Fellowship Centre. After finishing high school Khaya wanted to pursue a career in music but his parents were not keen on the idea and so he went on to study project management at the varsity college but remained active in a church as a music director of the church choir.

== Career ==
=== Early 2010s: Career beginnings ===
Khaya discovered his career in singing when he was in high school. Khaya Mthethwa first appeared as a backing vocalist singing tenor for Joyous Celebration co-founder Mthunzi Namba's Mercy album. He was then asked to join Joyous Celebration two days prior to the live recording of Joyous Celebration 15 in 2010.

In 2012 Khaya appeared on Ntokozo Mbambo's Filled studio album, again as a backing vocalist. In 2012, he entered Idols South Africa with the intention of trying out a different genre to enhance his music abilities. He went on to win the competition. he won with over 80% of the public votes.

In 2013, he participated in another TV competition, The Clash of the Choirs, this time as part of the KwaZulu-Natal choir; the group won. Khaya can sing gospel, pop, jazz and R&B, and he is a self-taught musician who can play a keyboard, guitar, drums and percussion. He is also a songwriter, and wrote most of the songs in his debut album, For You.

Khaya Mthethwa is a host of Gospel Alive a Gospel TV show that premiered 3 November 2013 on Multichoice DSTV's Mzansi magic channel, on which he worked with content producer Tebogo Rameetse. In 2015 he was ordained as a pastor. In 2014 he released a live DVD recording titled The Uprising. in 2016 he released The Dawn, and in 2018 he released Mkhulumsebenzi.

== Television ==
In late 2013 he began hosting the Mzansi Magic religious music talk show Gospel Alive. On 21 May 2017 he started hosting the BET gospel show Rhythm and Gospel and on 25 June 2017 he debuted as the host of SABC1's Sunday morning gospel show Gospel Avenue.

Show Character

Clash of the Choirs South Africa – Season 1 Choirmaster – KwaZulu-Natal

Code Green – Season 1 Himself

Cooking Gospel – Season 1 Himself

Gospel Alive – Season 1 Host- Himself

I Love South Africa – Season 1 Contestant – Himself

Idols – Season 8 Winner – Himself

Minnie Dlamini: Becoming Mrs. Jones – Season 1 musician-Himself

The Remix SA – Season 1 Guest judge- Himself

Zaziwa – Season 4 Himself

== Awards and nominations ==
Year	Award	Category	Results	Ref.
2016	SCGA	Best Gospel DVD	Won	
	12th AMFA	Best Newcomer award	Won	
2017	23rd SAMA	Live Audio Visual Recording Album	Nominated	
2017	SAMA	Best Contemporary Faith Music Album	Won	

== Discography ==
=== Albums ===
- For You (Universal Music Group, 2012)
- The Uprising (Universal Music Group, 2014)
- The Dawn 2016
- All About Jesus 2018

== Personal life ==
2 December 2017 in Mpumalanga Khaya Mthethwa celebrated his traditional wedding with the love of his life and Miss South Africa 2016, Ntandoyenkosi Kunene. Khaya Mthethwa and his wife Ntandoyenkosi only dated for three months, but he didn't want to waste time because he knew she was the one. Khaya explains his wife as a person who is an incredible human being, a person with a strong character and who comes from a phenomenal family. "Everything about her culminates into this beautiful person that I want to spend the rest of my life with." khaya said."As a husband my top job is to protect my wife. We just want to have an amazing marriage," Khaya said. They gym together and support Orlando Pirates. Everything is "very serene", he adds. "We cherry-pick each other every day." His love life has had its fair share of ups and downs, of course. He was romantically linked to actress Nomzamo Mbatha in 2015, then to her fellow Isibaya actress Jessica Nkosi. Khaya was often cited as the reason the two are no longer friendly but he doesn't want to be drawn into all that.

On 24 December 2019, they announced their divorce on social media platforms. The reason for their split remains concealed but Khaya did mention in one of his church sermons that the two years of their marriage were difficult and presented many challenges.

Preceded by Dave Van Vuuren	Idols South Africa winner Season 8 (2012)	Succeeded by Musa Sukwene
