= Maglera Doe Boy =

South African rapper and songwriter

Maglera
- Born: Tokelo Moyakhe; 3 August 1993 (age 33); Reitz, Free State, South Africa
- Occupations: Rapper; singer; songwriter; record producer
- Known for: Never Ride Remix
- Awards: South African Hip Hop Awards (Best Male Artist 2022)
- Musical career
- Origin: Kanana, North West
- Genre: Hip hop
- Instruments: Vocals
- Labels: Universal Music South Africa; Mythrone Records, Epic Records
- Website: IG.com/magleradoeboy

Tokelo Moyakhe (born 3 August 1993), is a South African rapper and songwriter known professionally as Maglera Doe Boy (or simply Maglera). He came to prominence subsequent to the release of "Never Ride" by MashBeatz after the single went viral on a video sharing platform TikTok.

In 2015 he made a name for himself after releasing his debut EP Progression which was later named Hype Magazine's top 5 underrated EPs and mixtapes.

Moyakhe signed a distribution deal with Universal Music South Africa through Khuli Chana's imprint Mythrone Records which he later released his debut studio album Diaspora under, and as he was named the fast rising artist from South Africa he was featured on the Apple Music Up Next playlist.

== Discography ==
=== Studio albums ===
- Diaspora (2022)
- Maglera Tapes (2024)

=== Collaborative albums ===
- Champion Music (with 25K & DJ Sliqe) (2020)
- Champion Music 2 (with 25K & DJ Sliqe) (2022)

=== Extended plays ===
- Progression (2015)
- 2Player (2019)

=== Features ===
- '018's Finest' by Boity (2022)
- 'Pramis, Swuh' by Flow Jones Jr. & Blxckie (2023)
- 'Gwan' by Dee Koala (2023)
- '018' by Cassper Nyovest (2023)
- Barker Haines' by Wordz feat. Mochen (2023)
- 'Kill The Noise' by Nasty C feat. Anica (2023)

== Awards and nominations ==
Year	Award ceremony	Category	Recipient/Nominated work	Results	Ref.
2022	11th South African Hip Hop Awards	Best remix	"Never Ride Remix"	Won	
2022	11th South African Hip Hop Awards	Best Male	Himself	Won	
2023	Metro FM Music Award	Best hip hop Artist	"Diaspora"	Nominated	
2024	GQ Best Dressed Awards	Best Dessed Street style	Himself	Won	
2024	BET Hip-Hop Awards	Best International Flow	Himself	Nominated	
2025	BET Hip-Hop Awards	Best New International Act	Himself	Nominated	
