= Testify (Caleb Johnson album) =

Studio album by Caleb Johnson
- Released: August 12, 2014
- Recorded: May–June 2014
- Genre: Rock
- Length: 40:16
- Labels: Interscope; 19
- Producer: Howard Benson

Singles from Testify
- 1. "As Long as You Love Me" Released: May 2014; 2. "Only One" Released: July 28, 2014; 3. "Fighting Gravity" Released: 2015

Testify is the debut album by American Idol season thirteen winner, Caleb Johnson. Its first single was released in July 2014 and the album was released on August 12, 2014, by Interscope Records and is produced by Howard Benson.

== Background ==
The album was first announced soon after Johnson won American Idol. Then it was assumed that the album would be self-titled but on June 23, it was revealed that the album would be titled, Testify. Johnson co-wrote six of the ten tracks and worked with musicians such as, Blair Daly, James Michael of Sixx:AM, Sam Hollander, Aloe Blacc, Justin Tranter of Semi Precious Weapons, and Dave Bassett. The album's first single, "Only One", was released July 28, 2014, and his Idol coronation song, "As Long as You Love Me" will serve as a bonus track.

Johnson recorded the album in three weeks in between the Idol finale and tour. He says, "The week after the show ended, I flew all over the place and did a press run," "Immediately after that, I flew back to L.A. and started working on the record. I wrote 12 or 13 songs. Out of those, we picked eight to put on the record." About the songwriting progress, "We really just bounced off each other and pulled these songs out. Most of these songs we wrote in half a day, because we were going so quickly", says Johnson.

== Critical reception ==
Professional ratings
Review scores
Source	Rating
All Music	3.5/5 stars
Knoxville News Sentinel	2.5/5 stars

The Knoxville News Sentinel's Chuck Campbell says that Johnson "has a likeable personality and a strong voice. But he's an underdeveloped performer on his undercooked new Testify, blandly molded to appeal to an overbroad audience, much like American Idol itself."

== Commercial performance ==
The album debuted on Billboard 200 at No. 24 with 11,000 copies sold in its debut week, giving him the distinction of having the lowest first week sales and inaugural chart position of any American Idol winner. The album has sold 24,000 copies in the United States as of April 2016. Including album equivalent units, a total of 30,695 units has been sold as of March 2018.

Johnson also has the distinction of being the first American Idol winner to have their Idol coronation song, "As Long as You Love Me," fail to chart on the Billboard Hot 100 charts.

== Track listing ==
Testify – Standard edition
No.	Title	Writer(s)	Length
1.	"Sailing Away"	Jonny Litten, Lenny Skolnik, Sidnie Tipton	3:21
2.	"Save Me"	Caleb Johnson, Joleen Belle, Tom Leonard, Skolnik	3:39
3.	"Let Me In"	Johnson, Blair Daly, James Michael	3:02
4.	"Only One"	Johnson, Josh Alexander, Sam Hollander	4:09
5.	"Fighting Gravity"	Johnson, Skolnik, Brian Howes	3:58
6.	"Devil's Daughter"	Johnson, Daly, Steve Diamond	3:34
7.	"Another Life"	Eric D. Wortham II, Egbert Nathaniel Dawkins III, Freddy Wexler	3:16
8.	"Change"	Johnson, Mitch Allan, Nate Cyphert	3:52
9.	"Testify"	Johnson, Daly, Dave Bassett	3:47
10.	"As Long as You Love Me"	Justin Hawkins	3:08
Total length:			35:46

Testify – Deluxe edition
No.	Title	Writer(s)	Length
11.	"Dream On"	Steven Tyler	4:40
Total length:			40:26

== Personnel ==
Adapted from AllMusic.

=== Performers ===
- All vocals – Caleb Johnson
- Background vocals – Justin Hawkins, Johnny Litten, Lenny Skolnik
- Choir/chorus – Monet Bagneris, Auvrell Christophe, Calvin Dupree, Tommy Leonard

=== Design ===
- Photography – Brian Bowen-Smith
- Art direction – Stephanie Hsu, Sean Mosher-Smith
- Design – Sean Mosher-Smith

=== Musicians ===
- Baritone saxophone – Cochemea Gastelum
- Bass – Jon Button, Chris Chaney
- Drums – Randy Cooke, Josh Freese, Joe Rickard
- Guitars – Josh Freese, Phil X
- Hammond B3 – Howard Benson
- Horns – The Dap Kings Horns
- Keyboards – Howard Benson, Johnny Litten, Lenny Skolnik
- Tenor saxophone – Neal Sugarman
- Trumpet – Dave Guy

=== Production ===
- A&R – Monica Benson, John Ehmann, Marta Navas, Katherine Neil, Marisa Torbet, Jeanne Venton
- Digital editing – Paul DeCarlie
- Drum technician – Jon Nicholson
- Engineer – Wayne Gordon, Mike Plotnikoff
  - Assistant engineer – Sean Anders, Anthony Martinez, Muktar Muktar
  - Overdub engineer – Hatsukazu "Hatch" Inagaki
  - Vocal engineer – Hatsukazu "Hatch" Inagaki
- Management – Ginger Ramsey, Brianne Widaman
- Marketing – Jennifer Bowling
- Mastering – Brian Gardner
- Mixing – Chris Lord
  - Mixing assistant – Keith Armstrong, Ismael Barreto, Nik Karpen
- Producer – Howard Benson, Les Scurry
- Programming – Jonny Litten, Lenny Skolnik
- Publicity – Meghan Prophet, Christine Wolff
- String arrangement – Lenny Skolnik
- Voices – Howard Benson

== Release history ==
Country	Date	Label	Formats	Catalog
Germany	August 11, 2014	Universal Music Group	CD; digital download	
Canada	August 12, 2014	Universal Music Group	CD; digital download	
United States	August 12, 2014	Interscope Records; 19	CD; digital download	002132002
Japan	August 13, 2014	Universal Music Group	CD; digital download	
