= Lemons (Lemonade) =

2022 single by AKA and Nasty C

Single by AKA and Nasty C

from the album MASS COUNTRY
- Released: 16 September 2022
- Genre: Hip hop
- Length: 4:19
- Label: SME; South African Recordings
- Songwriter(s): Buntu Nqoloba; David Junior Ngcobo; Kiernan Jarryd Forbes; Phelela Gcwelumusa Ziphakeme Mathonsi
- Producer(s): Kiernan Jarryd Forbes; Christer Mofenyi Kobedi; Fundile Dlamini; Oriah Tshepo Phalane; Tshupo Khutsoane; Tshepo Frederick Moloi

AKA singles chronology
"Super Soft (Remix)" (2022)	"Lemons (Lemonade)" (2022)	"Paradise" (2022)

Nasty C singles chronology
"Can't Imagine" (2022)	"Lemons (Lemonade)" (2022)	"Power (Remember Who You Are) [Nasty C Remix]" (2022)

Music video
- "Lemons (Lemonade) (Official video)" on YouTube

Official audio
- "Lemons (Lemonade)" on YouTube

"Lemons (Lemonade)" is a single by South African rappers AKA and Nasty C, released on 16 September 2022 as the lead single from AKA’s fourth studio album MASS COUNTRY (2023). The music video premiered on YouTube the same day.

== Commercial performance ==
"Lemons (Lemonade)" peaked at number 2 on The Official South African Charts, was certified Gold in October 2022, and later 5× Platinum in 2023 by the Recording Industry of South Africa (RiSA).

== Composition and lyrics ==
According to GrungeCake, AKA "seems to be moving past his mourning stage" after the death of his fiancée Anele Tembe and was thankful that "people showed their true colours". Nasty C talked about "ageing gracefully, being truthful, and South Africa".

== Awards and nominations ==
Year	Award ceremony	Category	Recipient/Nominated work	Results	Ref.
2023	Metro FM Music Awards	Best Collaboration	"Lemons (Lemonade)"	Won	
2023	Metro FM Music Awards	Song of the Year	"Lemons (Lemonade)"	Nominated	
2023	DStv Content Creator Awards	Song of the Year	"Lemons (Lemonade)"	Won	
2023	South African Music Awards	Best Collaboration	"Lemons (Lemonade)"	Won	
2023	South African Music Awards	Best Produced Music Video	"Lemons (Lemonade)"	Nominated	

== Charts ==
Chart performance for "Lemons (Lemonade)"
Chart (2023)	Peak position
South Africa (RiSA)	2

== Certifications and sales ==
Region	Certification	Certified units/sales
South Africa (RISA)	5× Platinum	12,000,000
