= Caleb Johnson =

American singer (born 1991)

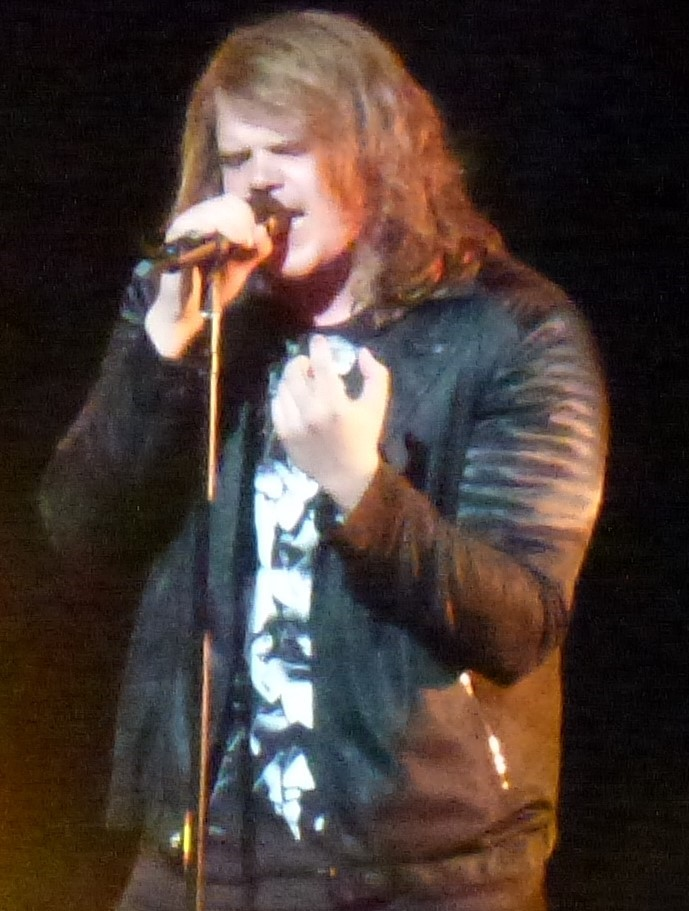
- Johnson performing in 2014

Background information
- Born: Caleb Perry Johnson; April 23, 1991 (age 35); Asheville, North Carolina, U.S.
- Genres: Rock, hard rock, heavy metal
- Occupations: Singer, songwriter
- Instruments: Vocals, guitar, piano
- Years active: 2010–present
- Labels: Big Johnson, Interscope, 19
- Formerly of: Caleb Johnson and the Ramblin' Saints; Trans-Siberian Orchestra
- Website: calebjohnsonofficial.com

Caleb Perry Johnson (born April 23, 1991) is an American singer who won the thirteenth season of American Idol. Prior to appearing on the series, he was the front man for the band Elijah Hooker. After American Idol, Johnson released his debut solo album, Testify, through Interscope Records. After leaving his label, he formed another group, Caleb Johnson and the Ramblin' Saints, and in 2019, the group self-released its first album, Born from Southern Ground.

== Early life ==
Caleb Johnson was born on April 23, 1991, to David and Tamra Johnson in Asheville, North Carolina. His mother works as an accountant, his father is a former football coach and works for the Parks and Recreation Department of Buncombe County, North Carolina, but both have backgrounds in music. He attended Clyde A. Erwin High School in Asheville and graduated in 2009. He played some sports in high school, joined the drama club and chorus, and did some mission work and some volunteering at his church, Calvary Baptist.

Johnson became interested in singing around age 17 when Josh Sawyer, who had a band in his high school, asked him to be the lead singer. The first song he performed in public in his high school was "Fortunate Son" by Creedence Clearwater Revival. He took part in a talent show while in high school with a band called Gorgon. He considers Chris Cornell to be his biggest musical influence, and that Rush is his favorite band.

== Music career ==
=== 2010: Elijah Hooker ===
After graduating Erwin High School in Asheville, North Carolina, on June 30, 2009, Caleb Johnson first joined a band called Rock Bottom as its lead singer. A year later, he joined his friend Josh Sawyer in rock band called Elijah Hooker and became its lead vocalist. Sawyer is the lead guitarist of the band; the other members of the band included Brian Turner on keyboard, Shawn Foerst on bass, and Colten Emery on drums.

Elijah Hooker released its self-titled debut album Elijah Hooker in June 2013. The 10-track album featured "Happiest Man" as its lead track.

=== 2011–14: American Idol ===
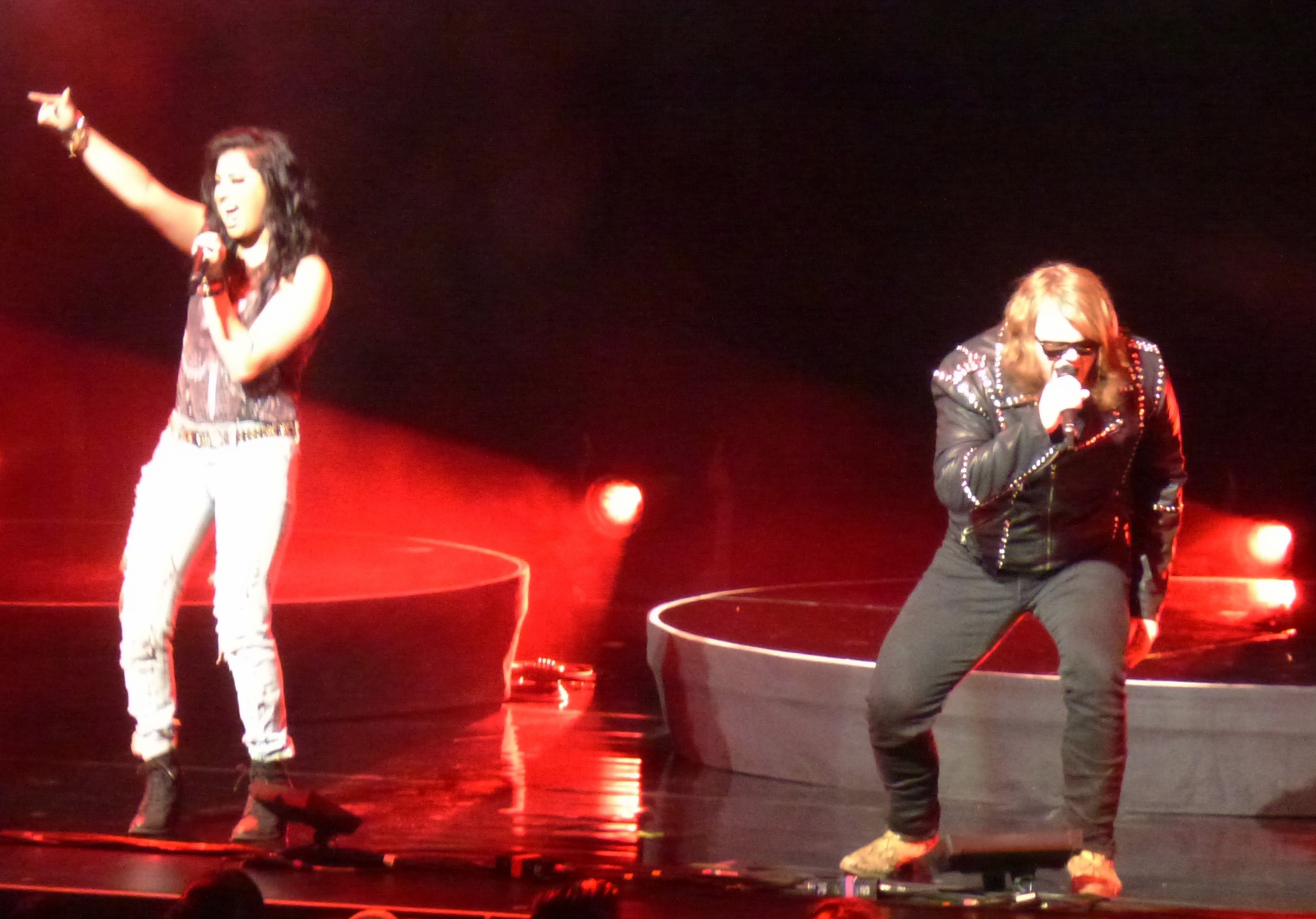
Johnson performing with Jena Irene Asciutto during the Season 13 American Idol tour.

Johnson auditioned for American Idol three times in four years. He first auditioned for the tenth season of American Idol in 2011. He was put through to Hollywood Week and was in a Hollywood group with James Durbin. In 2012, Johnson auditioned for the eleventh season and made it to the Top 42. He had difficulties in his performance of "Old Time Rock and Roll" and was cut at the Top 24 selection. He took the following year off from auditioning to improve on his stage presence.

Johnson auditioned again in 2014 for the thirteenth season and made it to the top 20. In the semi-final round, he was voted by America into the top five male contestants, giving him a spot in the season's top 13. Johnson got positive feedback from the judges every week, had strong performances, and became the only finalist in the season to never land in the bottom 3 prior to reaching the finale. That season, Johnson was declared the winner.

==== Season 13 of American Idol ====
| Episode | Theme | Song choice | Original artist | Order | Result |
|---|---|---|---|---|---|
| Audition | Auditioner's Choice | "Into the Void" (original composition) | Caleb Johnson | N/A | Advanced |
| Hollywood Round | A Capella | "Sympathy for the Devil" | The Rolling Stones | N/A | Advanced |
| Hollywood Round | Group Performance | "Too Close" with Tyler Ahlgren, Matthew Hamel, and C.J. Harris | Alex Clare | N/A | Advanced |
| Hollywood Round | Solo | "Radioactive" | Imagine Dragons | N/A | Advanced |
| Top 31 (10 Men) | Personal Choice | "Stay with Me" | Faces | 1 | Advanced |
| Top 13 | This Is Me | "Pressure and Time" | Rival Sons | 13 | Safe |
| Top 12 | Home | "Working Man" | Rush | 6 | Safe |
| Top 11 | Songs from the Cinema | "Skyfall" | Adele | 7 | Safe |
| Top 10 | Billboard Top 10 | "The Edge of Glory" | Lady Gaga | 6 | Safe |
| Top 9 | I'm with the Band! | "Dazed and Confused" | Jake Holmes | 6 | Safe |
| Top 8 | Back to the Start | Duet "Stop Draggin' My Heart Around" with Jessica Meuse | Stevie Nicks & Tom Petty | 5 | Safe |
| Top 8 | Back to the Start | Solo "Chain of Fools" | Aretha Franklin | 11 | Safe |
| Top 8 | Songs from the 1980s | Solo "Faithfully" | Journey | 12 | Safe |
| Top 8 | Songs from the 1980s | Duet "It's Only Love" with Jena Irene | Bryan Adams & Tina Turner | 5 | Safe |
| Top 7 | Competitors' Choice | Duet "Gimme Shelter" with Jena Irene | The Rolling Stones | 6 | Safe |
| Top 7 | Competitors' Choice | Solo "Family Tree" | Kings of Leon | 1 | Safe |
| Top 6 | Rock 'n' Roll | "Sting Me" | The Black Crowes | 5 | Safe |
| Top 6 | Country | "Undo It" | Carrie Underwood | 8 | Safe |
| Top 5 | America's Requests | Solo "I Don't Want to Miss a Thing" | Aerosmith | 2 | Safe |
| Top 5 | America's Requests | Duet "Beast of Burden" with Jessica Meuse | The Rolling Stones | 7 | Safe |
| Top 5 | America's Requests | Solo "Still of the Night" | Whitesnake | 12 | Safe |
| Top 4 | Love Songs | "You Give Love a Bad Name" | Bon Jovi | 1 | Safe |
| Top 4 | Love Songs | "Travelin' Band" | Creedence Clearwater Revival | 5 | Safe |
| Top 4 | Love Songs | "Maybe I'm Amazed" | Paul McCartney | 9 | Safe |
| Top 3 | Randy Jackson's Choice | "Never Tear Us Apart" | INXS | 1 | Safe |
| Top 3 | Judges' Choice | "Demons" | Imagine Dragons | 4 | Safe |
| Top 3 | Hometown's Choice | "Dazed and Confused" | Jake Holmes | 7 | Safe |
| Finale | Simon Fuller's Choice | "Dream On" | Aerosmith | 2 | Winner |
| Finale | Reprisal Song | "Maybe I'm Amazed" | Paul McCartney | 4 | Winner |
| Finale | Winner's Single | "As Long as You Love Me" | Caleb Johnson | 6 | Winner |

=== 2014–present ===
Soon after Johnson won American Idol he started working on his debut album. The album was recorded in three weeks and Johnson collaborated with musicians such as Howard Benson, Aloe Blacc, Brian Howes, Blair Daly and James Michael. Testify was released on August 12, 2014.

After parting ways with his record label in late 2015, Johnson began working on his second album independently. The album was set to be released in 2016 but failed to. The lead single, "Holding On," was released on February 9, 2016. A second single, "Hanging with the Band," was released on April 7, 2016.

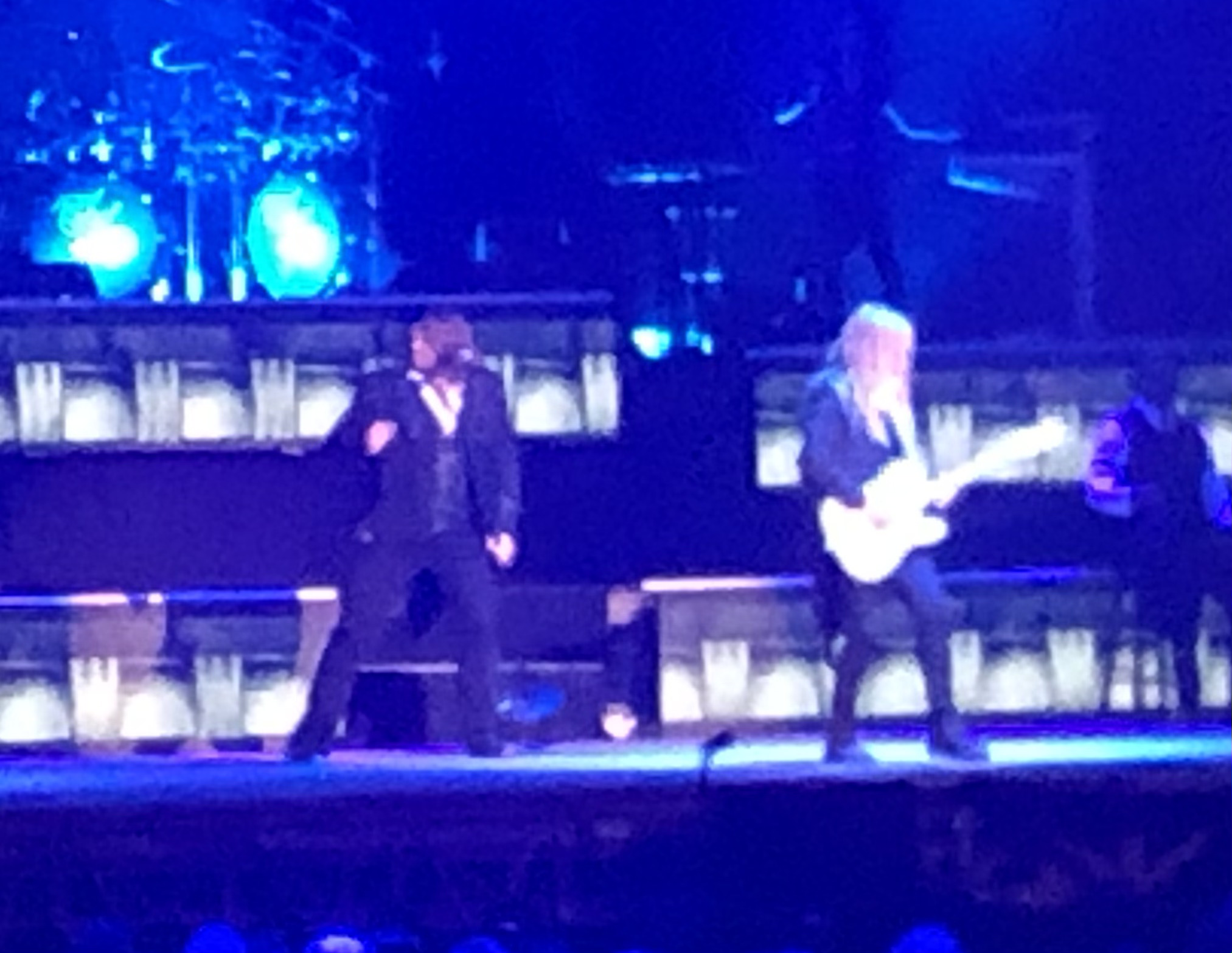
Johnson (pictured left) performing with Trans-Siberian Orchestra in 2021 in Worcester, Massachusetts.

In 2018, Johnson joined Trans-Siberian Orchestra for their winter tour singing on "Three Kings & I."

On June 14, 2019, Johnson released an album, Born from Southern Ground, as Caleb Johnson & The Ramblin Saints. Johnson explained the addition of his backing band on the album: "The Ramblin Saints is my band. We decided to add the band name to my name and that would take it more into that rock direction. We used people like Bob Seger and the Silver Bullet Band or Tom Petty and the Heartbreakers as a template. The musicians are from Nashville. I have two separate bands a studio band that I use based out of Nashville and my touring band is based out of Asheville." The album was produced by Johnson on his own newly created label, Big Johnson Records.

Johnson's next album, Mountain Mojo Vol. 1, was released on June 18, 2021. The album has contributions from Jason Bonham, Tyler Bryant, Josh Sawyer, Audley Freed, Tony Lucido, Mike Webb, Damon Johnson, Gale Mayes, Devonne Michele, and Angela Primm.

Johnson joined the Neverland Express band of American singer Meat Loaf and songwriter Jim Steinman in 2021 and they released Paradise Found: Bat Out Of Hell Reignited released on January 27, 2023 under Deko Entertainment. Johnson toured the United Kingdom along with Neverland Express in May 2023.

== Discography ==
=== Studio albums ===
with Elijah Hooker

- Elijah Hooker (2013)

Solo

| Title | Details | Peak chart positions | | Sales |
| Title | Details | US | US Rock | Sales |
|---|---|---|---|---|
| Testify | Released: August 12, 2014; Label: Interscope, 19; Formats: CD, digital download | 24 | 9 | US: 28,000 |

with Caleb Johnson & The Ramblin' Saints

- Born from Southern Ground (2019)

=== Singles ===
| Year | Song | Peak positions | | Sales | Album |
| Year | Song | US | US Rock | Sales | Album |
|---|---|---|---|---|---|
| 2014 | "As Long As You Love Me" | — | 41 | US: 10,000 | Testify |
| 2014 | "Only One" | — | — | | Testify |
| 2015 | "Fighting Gravity" | — | — | | Testify |
| 2016 | "Holding On" | — | — | | Born from Southern Ground |
| 2016 | "Hanging with the Band" | — | — | | Born from Southern Ground |
| 2021 | "Dead Man Walking Blues" (featuring Jason Bonham and Damon Johnson) | — | — | | Mountain Mojo Vol. 1 |
| 2021 | "Drift Away (Acoustic)" | — | — | — | Mountain Mojo Vol. 1 |
| 2021 | "Hurricane" (featuring Jason Bonham and Damon Johnson) | — | — | | Mountain Mojo Vol. 1 |
| 2021 | "Glory Bound" (featuring Audley Freed and Damon Johnson) | — | — | | Mountain Mojo Vol. 1 |

Release from "American Idol"

- "The Edge of Glory"
- "Dazed and Confused"
- "Chain of Fools"
- "Faithfully"
- "Family Tree"
- "Sting Me"
- "I Don't Want to Miss a Thing"
- "Travelin' Band"

=== Music videos ===
| Year | Song |
|---|---|
| 2015 | "Fighting Gravity" |

== See also ==
- List of Idols winners
