= Musa Keys =

South African record producer

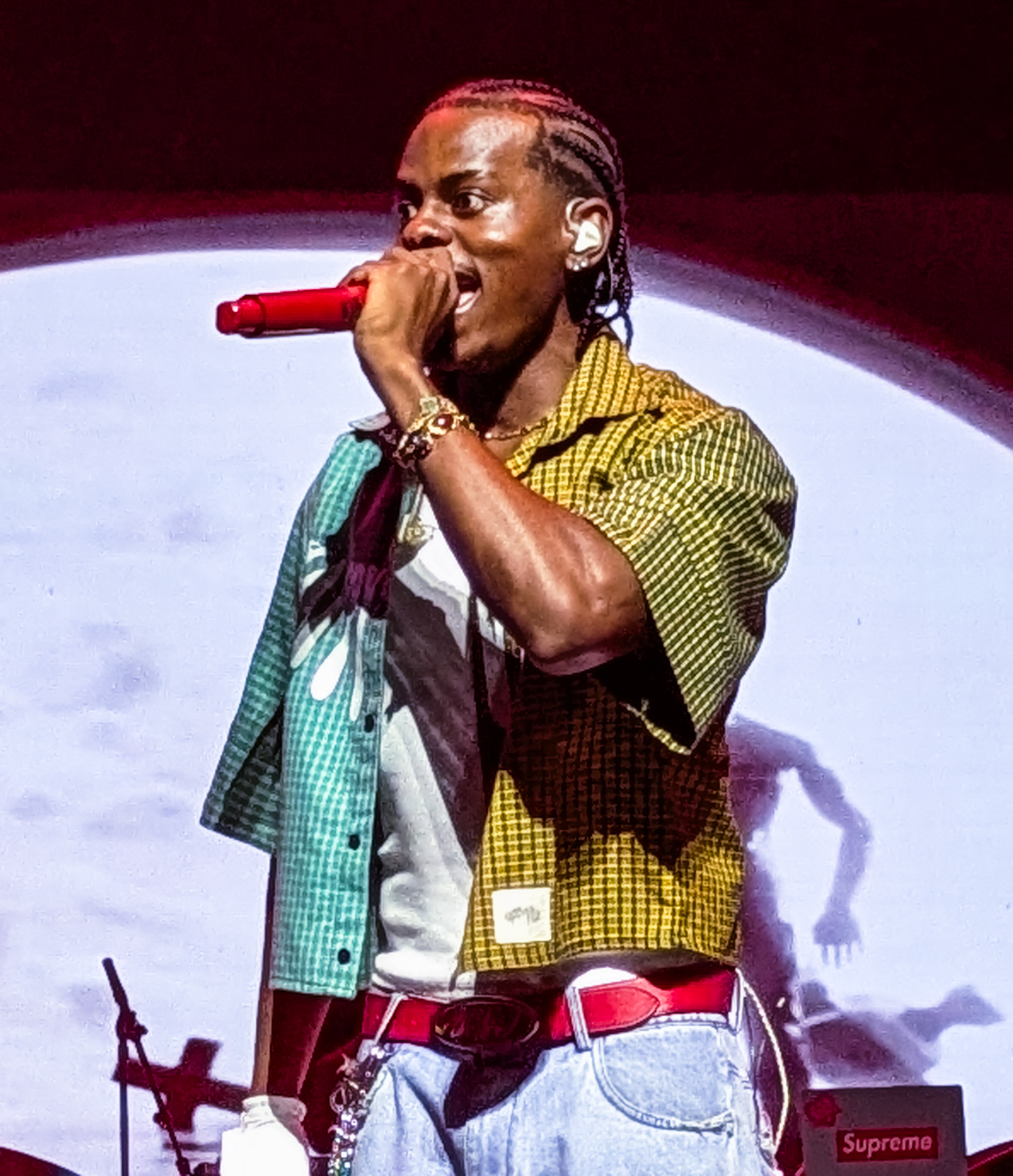

Background information
- Also known as: Keys
- Born: Musa Appreciate Makamu; 30 July 2000 (age 26); Giyani, Limpopo, South Africa
- Origin: Flora Park, Polokwane, South Africa
- Genre: Amapiano
- Occupations: DJ; record producer; singer-songwriter
- Instruments: DAW; sampler; FL Studio; vocals; piano
- Years active: 2021–present
- Label: Keys

Musa Appreciate Makamu (born 30 July 2000), professionally known as Musa Keys, is a South African singer and record producer born in Giyani and raised in Flora Park, Polokwane. Makamu gained recognition from the song "samarian boy" across the limpopo region, he is known for his 2021 single "Vula Mlomo" which was certified double platinum by the Recording Industry of South Africa (RiSA).

In 2023 the record producer took home a Metro FM Music Award for Best Styled Artist where he was nominated alongside the likes of Mafikizolo, Sjava, Daliwonga and Sino Msolo.

== Awards and nominations ==
Year	Award Ceremony	Prize	Recipient/Nominated work	Result	Ref.
2023	Metro FM Music Awards	Best Styled Artist	Himself	Won	
2022	MTV Europe Music Awards	Best African Act	Himself	Nominated	
2022	South African Music Awards	Record of the Year	"Vula Mlomo"	Won	
2024	Grammy Awards	Best African Music Performance	"Unavailable" (Davido feat. Musa Keys)	Nominated	
2025	Xitsonga Music Awards	Best Xitsonga House	"Vafana Va Mali"	Pending	
2025	Xitsonga Music Awards	Song of the Year	"Vafana Va Mali"	Pending	
