= Motswedi Modiba =

South African singer-songwriter

- Born: Motswedi Modiba; 1997 (age 28–29); Tshwane, South Africa
- Education: Pretoria Chinese School
- Alma mater: Wits University (BMus. 2021); Manhattan School of Music (MMus)
- Occupation: Singer-songwriter
- Years active: 2022–present
- Television: Sing! China (2023)
- Awards: Metro FM Music Award for Best New Age R&B Act (2023)
- Musical career
- Also known as: MOE.
- Genres: R&B
- Instrument: Vocals
- Labels: Feel Good Music; Sony Music Entertainment
- Website: iG.com/moe.

Motswedi Modiba (born 1997), is a South African R&B singer-songwriter born and raised in Tshwane best known under the alias of MOE. (stylized in all uppercase). She is best known for her debut single "It Was a Vibe" with guest appearance from JR which accumulated over 35 000 streams across Africa, the United States and Europe.

In 2023, Modiba took home a Metro FM Music Award for Best New Age R&B Act, however the award was received by her parents as she was preparing for her exams at the Manhattan School of Music in the New York City. After returning to South Africa, she furthered her studies at Wits University where she was also a back up singer for Dr Tumi.

She is fluent in Mandarin as she attended a Chinese school in Pretoria and earned herself a scholarship to study Chinese literature in China.

In 2023, Motswedi became the first black and African to compete in one of the biggest shows in China, Sing! China (Voice of China) where she sang in fluent Mandarin.

== Awards and nominations ==
Year	Award Ceremony	Prize	Recipient/Nominated work	Result	Ref.
2023	Metro FM Music Awards	Best New Age R&B Act	Herself	Won	
