= Myztro =

South African musician

Tshiamiso Sekowe
- Born: Tshiamiso Sekowe; Soshanguve, South Africa
- Other name: Myztro
- Education: Reitumetse High School (matriculated)
- Alma mater: Tshwane University of Technology (TUT)
- Occupations: DJ; record producer; composer
- Years active: 2020–present
- Relatives: DJ Maphorisa (elder brother)
- Awards: South African Music Award for Newcomer of the Year (2023)
- Musical career
- Also known as: Bra Biza
- Instruments: Vocals; DAW; Sampler
- Labels: New Money Gang; Sony Music Entertainment Africa
- Website: iG.com/myztro

Tshiamiso Sekowe is a South African DJ and record producer professionally known under the alias of Myztro. Born and bred in Soshanguve, he is the biological brother of DJ Maphorisa.

He came to prominence subsequent to the release of "Emcimbini", "Dipatje tsa Felo" and "66", the latter certified Multi-Platinum by the Recording Industry of South Africa (RiSA).

== Awards and nominations ==
Year	Award ceremony	Category	Recipient/Nominated work	Results	Ref.
2021	Mzansi Kwaito and House Music Awards	Most Voted Song	"Emcimbini"	Nominated	
2022	All Africa Music Awards	Best Artiste/Duo/Group in African Electro	"66 & Dipatje Tsa Felo"	Nominated	
2023	Metro FM Music Awards	Best Viral Challenge	"Tobetsa"	Nominated	
2023	South African Music Awards	Newcomer of the Year	Nkwari 2.0	Won	
2023	South African Music Awards	Best Amapiano Album	Nkwari 2.0	Pending	
2023	South African Music Awards	Remix of the Year	"Tobetsa Remake"	Pending	
