= Wingate Park =

Suburb of Pretoria, South Africa

- Location within Gauteng Location within South Africa Location within Africa
- Coordinates: 25°49′38″S 28°16′3″E
- Country: South Africa
- Province: Gauteng
- Municipality: City of Tshwane
- Main Place: Pretoria

Area
  - Total: 3.51 km^{2} (1.36 sq mi)

Population (2011)
  - Total: 3,099
  - Density: 883/km^{2} (2,290/sq mi)

Racial makeup (2011)
  - Black African: 17.2%
  - Coloured: 2.2%
  - Indian/Asian: 1.1%
  - White: 79.4%
  - Other: 0.2%

First languages (2011)
  - Afrikaans: 67.9%
  - English: 19.6%
  - Zulu: 2.2%
  - Northern Sotho: 2.1%
  - Other: 8.2%
- Time zone: UTC+2 (SAST)
- Postal code (street): 0181
- PO box: 0153
- Area code: 012

Wingate Park is a suburb of the city of Pretoria, South Africa. Located south-east of Pretoria CBD and just west of Moreleta Park in a leafy, established area that is home to the city's medium expensive real estate.
