= Idols South Africa season 8 =

Idols South Africa
- Season 8
- Hosted by: ProVerb
- Judges: Unathi Msengana; Gareth Cliff; Randall Abrahams
- Winner: Khaya Mthethwa
- Runner-up: Melissa Allison

Release
- Original network: M-Net, M-Net HD & Mzansi Magic
- Original release: 3 June – 2 October 2012

Season chronology
- ← Previous; Season 7 Next → Season 9

Idols South Africa VIII is the eighth season of South African reality interactive talent show based on the British talent show Pop Idol.

After the auditions, call backs will be held in Sun City for the golden ticket holders.

== Regional auditions ==
Auditions began February 2012, and were held in the following cities:

Episode Air Date	Audition City	Audition Date	Audition Venue	Tickets to Sun City
3 June 2012	Johannesburg, Gauteng	4 February 2012	Sandton Convention Centre	39
3 June 2012	Soweto, Gauteng	25 February 2012	Walter Sisulu Hall	39
10 June 2012	Durban, Kwazulu Natal	11 February 2012	uShaka Marine World	21
17 June 2012	Cape Town, Western Cape	18 February 2012	Grandwest Arena	29
			Total countrywide	89

- Johannesburg and Soweto auditions were aired together on the same episode, 39 golden tickets were given between the two episodes.

== Top 18 Show ==
The judges chose the top 18 on Sunday 15 July 2012.

	Contestant	Age	Hometown	Occupation
1	Candida Mosoma	29	Pretoria	Performer
2	Chloe Kiley	24	Cape Town	Performer
3	Dominic Neill	20	Johannesburg	Entertainer
4	Dumi Masilela	24	Johannesburg	Soccer Player and Singer
5	Jean Huisman	20	Port Elizabeth	Student
6	Khaya Mthethwa	25	Durban	Singer
7	Maryke Buffel	22	Paarl	Singer
8	Matthew Sampson	21	Cape Town	Musician
9	Melissa Alison	23	Port Elizabeth	Musician
10	Monde Msutwana	30	Witbank	Marketing Assistant and Radio Presenter
11	Nosipho Mngomezulu	22	Brakpan	Farmer
12	Obakeng Ramaboa	26	Munsieville	Singer
13	Shekhinah Donnell	17	Durban	Student
14	Makoma Mahowa	23	Ermelo	Performer
15	Simphiwe Gwegwe	23	Port Nolloth	Performer
16	Thabisa Mhlakulwana (Rich)	28	Port Elizabeth	Singer
17	Treasure Mushwana	21	Roodepoort	Musician
18	Tshidi Tenyane	28	Thokoza	Jewelry Designer and Musician

=== Semi-final: Male ===
The Top 18 contestants were split into two groups male and female and performed a song of their own choice. The guys group show aired on 21 July 2012 and the girls group show air on 22 July 2012 and viewers had the week to vote for their Top 10.

	Guys	Age	Hometown	Song (Original Artist)	Percentage of calls
1	Matthew Sampson	21	Cape Town	"Save Tonight" (Eagle-Eye Cherry)	3,24% (9/9)
2	Dumi Masilela	24	Johannesburg	"Sexy Love" (Ne-Yo)	4,91% (6/9)
3	Obakeng Ramaboa	26	Munsieville	"If There's Any Justice" (Lemar)	6,29% (4/9)
4	Jean Huisman	20	Port Elizabeth	"Love the One You're With" (Stephen Stills)	4,88% (7/9)
5	Simphiwe Gwegwe	23	Port Nolloth	"Angel" (Sarah McLachlan)	14,40% (2/9)
6	Dominic Neill	20	Johannesburg	"Don't Stop the Music" (Jamie Cullum)	5,02% (5/9)
7	Monde Msutwana	30	Witbank	"When a Woman Loves" (R. Kelly)	8,47% (3/9)
8	Khaya Mthethwa	24	Johannesburg	"If I Ain't Got You" (Alicia Keys)	49,36% (1/9)
9	Treasure Mushwana	21	Roodepoort	"Cooler Than Me" (Mike Posner)	3,41% (8/9)

=== Semi-final: Female ===
	Girls	Age	Hometown	Song (Original Artist)	Percentage of calls
1	Siphesihle Ndaba	23	Ermelo	"Firework" (Katy Perry)	6,63% (8/9)
2	Tshidi Tenyane	28	Thokoza	"And I Am Telling You I'm Not Going" (Jennifer Hudson)	14,69% (2/9)
3	Maryke Buffel	22	Paarl	"Rock Steady" (Aretha Franklin)	7,99% (6/9)
4	Chloe Kiley	24	Cape Town	"Somebody That I Used to Know" (Gotye)	11,23% (4/9)
5	Shekhinah Donnell	17	Durban	"Thinking of You" (Katy Perry)	25,78% (1/9)
6	Nosipho Mngomezulu	22	Brakpan	"Respect" (Aretha Franklin)	10,36% (5/9)
7	Thabisa Mhlakulwana(Rich)	28	Port Elizabeth	"Loliwe" (Zahara)	6,85% (7/9)
8	Melissa Alison	23	Port Elizabeth	"Domino" (Jessie J)	11,75% (3/9)
9	Candida Mosoma	29	Pretoria	"The Edge of Glory" (Lady Gaga)	4,70% (9/9)

== Finals ==
=== Finalists ===
(ages stated at time of contest)

Contestant	Age	Hometown	Voted Off	Spectacular Theme
Khaya Mthethwa	25	Durban	Winner	Final
Melissa Alison	23	Port Elizabeth	Runner-Up	Final
Monde Msutwana	30	Witbank	25 Sep 2012	Semi-Final
Tshidi Tenyane	28	Thokoza	18 Sep 2012	Homebrew
Simphiwe Gwegwe	23	Port Nolloth	11 Sep 2012	Greatest song according to Rolling Stone Magazine
Shekhinah Donnell	17	Durban	4 Sep 2012	Showstopper
Dominic Neill	20	Johannesburg	28 Aug 2012	Soul
Chloe Kiley	24	Cape Town	21 Aug 2012	Song from My Birth Year
Nosipho Mngomezulu	22	Brakpan	14 Aug 2012	Grammy Award Winner
Obakeng Ramaboa	26	Munsieville	7 Aug 2012	Old school/ New School

=== Top 10 – Old/New School ===
Order	Contestant	Song (Original Artist)	Percentage of calls
1	Nosipho Mngomezulu	"Lady Marmalade" (Patti LaBelle)	3,86% (7/10)
2	Obakeng Ramaboa	"Kiss" (Prince)	3,00% (10/10)
3	Monde Msutwana	"Can't Get Enough of Your Love, Babe" (Barry White)	3,89% (6/10)
4	Chloe Kiley	"Missing You" (John Waite)	5,80% (5/10)
5	Simphiwe Gwegwe	"Kiss and Say Goodbye" (Denim)	9,01% (4/10)
6	Dominic Neill	"I Need A Dollar" (Aloe Blacc)	3,40% (8/10)
7	Melissa Allison	"Superstition" (Stevie Wonder)	3,29% (9/10)
8	Khaya Mthethwa	"I Don't Wanna Miss a Thing" (Aerosmith)	33,09% (1/10)
9	Shekhinah Donnell	"Simply the Best" (Tina Turner)	9,64% (3/10)
10	Tshidi Tenyane	"How Will I Know" (Whitney Houston)	25,01% (2/10)

=== Top 9 – Grammy Award winner ===
Guest Performance: John Legend

Order	Contestant	Song (Original Artist)	Percentage of calls
1	Khaya Mthethwa	"Without You" (David Guetta feat Usher)	29,73% (1/9)
2	Monde Msutwana	"Crawling Back to You" (Daughtry)	6,95% (6/9)
3	Melissa Allison	"Gabriel" (Joe Goddard)	8,80% (5/9)
4	Shekhinah Donnell	"Marry the Night" (Lady Gaga)	12,56% (3/9)
5	Simphiwe Gwegwe	"Beautiful Monster" (Ne-Yo)	11,46% (4/9)
6	Tshidi Tenyane	"My Immortal" (Evanescence)	16,06% (2/9)
7	Nosipho Mngomezulu	"Grenade" (Bruno Mars)	3,77% (9/9)
8	Dominic Neill	"Dynamite" (Taio Cruz)	5,63% (7/9)
9	Chloe Kiley	"Misery Business" (Paramore)	5,03% (8/9)

=== Top 8 – Song from My Birth Year ===
Order	Contestant	Song (Original Artist)	Percentage of calls
1	Tshidi Tenyane (1984)	"It's Raining Men" (The Weather Girls)	11,98% (3/8)
2	Dominic Neill (1992)	"To Be with You" (Mr. Big)	5,67% (7/8)
3	Simphiwe Gwegwe (1989)	"Man in the Mirror" (Michael Jackson)	11,15% (4/8)
4	Chloe Kiley (1988)	"Never Tear Us Apart" (INXS)	5,66% (8/8)
5	Monde Msutwana (1982)	"Rosanna" (Toto)	9,84% (6/8)
6	Khaya Mthethwa (1988)	"September" (Earth, Wind and Fire)	31,91% (1/8)
7	Melissa Allison (1989)	"Eternal Flame" (The Bangles)	10,13% (5/8)
8	Shekhinah Donnell (1995)	"Waterfalls" (TLC)	13,65% (2/8)

=== Top 7 – Soul ===
Order	Contestant	Song (Original Artist)	Percentage of calls
1	Simphiwe Gwegwe	"Sign of a Victory" (R. Kelly)	11,51% (5/7)
2	Tshidi Tenyane	"As" (Mary J. Blige)	11,91% (4/7)
3	Monde Msutwana	"Purple Rain" (Prince)	12,28% (3/7)
4	Dominic Neill	"Paradise" (Coldplay)	6,57% (7/7)
5	Shekhinah Donnell	"I Try" (Macy Grey)	14,94% (2/7)
6	Khaya Mthethwa	"The World's Greatest" (R. Kelly)	33,12% (1/7)
7	Melissa Allison	"Sisters Are Doin' It for Themselves" (Aretha Franklin & Eurythmics)	9,67% (6/7)

=== Top 6 – Showstopper ===
Order	Contestant	Song (Original Artist)	Percentage of calls
1	Shekhinah Donnell	"Till the World Ends" (Britney Spears)	10,98% (6/6)
2	Melissa Allison	"Where Have You Been" (Rihanna)	13,75% (3/6)
3	Monde Msutwana	"Scream" (Usher)	12,07% (5/6)
4	Simphiwe Gwegwe	"Turn Up the Music" (Chris Brown)	14,48% (2/6)
5	Khaya Mthethwa	"Knock You Down" (Keri Hilson, Ne-Yo & Kanye West)	36,58% (1/6)
6	Tshidi Tenyane	"Crazy in Love" (Beyoncé ft. Jay-Z)	12,15% (4/6)

=== Top 5 – Greatest songs according to Rolling Stone Magazine ===
Order	Contestant	Song (Original Artist)	Percentage of calls
1	Monde Msutwana	"One" (U2)	14,41% (4/5)
1	Monde Msutwana	"Cry Me a River" (Justin Timberlake)	14,41% (4/5)
2	Simphiwe Gwegwe	"No Woman, No Cry" (Bob Marley)	13,66% (5/5)
2	Simphiwe Gwegwe	"I Can't Make You Love Me" (Bonnie Raitt)	13,66% (5/5)
3	Tshidi Tenyane	"Imagine" (John Lennon)	16,57% (2/5)
3	Tshidi Tenyane	"River Deep - Mountain High" (Ike & Tina Turner)	16,57% (2/5)
4	Khaya Mthethwa	"Let's Get It On" (Marvin Gaye)	40,41% (1/5)
4	Khaya Mthethwa	"Try a Little Tenderness" (Otis Redding)	40,41% (1/5)
5	Melissa Allison	"Ain't No Sunshine" (Bill Withers)	14,95% (3/5)
5	Melissa Allison	"Proud Mary" (Tina Turner)	14,95% (3/5)

=== Top 4 – Homebrew ===
Order	Contestant	Song (Original Artist)	Percentage of calls
1	Melissa Allison	"Lovesick" (The Arrows)	19,57% (2/4)
1	Melissa Allison	"Ndihamba Nawe" (Mafikizolo)	19,57% (2/4)
2	Monde Msutwana	"Dominoes" (Brian Temba)	19,20% (3/4)
2	Monde Msutwana	"Indigo Girl" (Watershed)	19,20% (3/4)
3	Tshidi Tenyane	"Ndawo Yami" (Zamajobe)	16,20% (4/4)
3	Tshidi Tenyane	"Doo Bee Doo" (Freshlyground)	16,20% (4/4)
4	Khaya Mthethwa	"Lengoma" (Zahara)	45,03% (1/4)
4	Khaya Mthethwa	"Blue Eyes" (Springbok Nude Girls)	45,03% (1/4)
N/A	Monde Msutwana	"Think Like a Man" (Jennifer Hudson & Ne-Yo feat. Rick Ross)	N/A
N/A	Tshidi Tenyane	"Think Like a Man" (Jennifer Hudson & Ne-Yo feat. Rick Ross)	N/A
N/A	Melissa Allison	"Need You Now" (Lady Antebellum)	N/A
N/A	Khaya Mthethwa	"Need You Now" (Lady Antebellum)	N/A

=== Top 3 – Theatre week (Semi-final) ===
Order	Contestant	Song (Original Artist)	Percentage of calls
1	Monde Msutwana	"By Your Side" (Sade)	20,71% (3/3)
1	Monde Msutwana	"Pumped Up Kicks" (Foster the People)	20,71% (3/3)
1	Monde Msutwana	"Night Shift" (Commodores)	20,71% (3/3)
2	Melissa Allison	"Fallin'" (Alicia Keys)	22,09% (2/3)
2	Melissa Allison	"Chasing Pavements" (Adele)	22,09% (2/3)
2	Melissa Allison	"Unfaithful" (Rihanna)	22,09% (2/3)
3	Khaya Mthethwa	"Down to Earth" (Justin Bieber)	57,21% (1/3)
3	Khaya Mthethwa	"She Will Be Loved" (Maroon 5)	57,21% (1/3)
3	Khaya Mthethwa	"Super Bass" (Nicki Minaj)	57,21% (1/3)

=== Top 2 – Final (Favourite performance, Most Talkes Performance & Winner's single) ===
Guest Judge:Ciara

Order	Contestant	Song (Original Artist)	Result
N/A	Melissa Allison	"No Air" (Chris Brown ft. Jordin Sparks)	N/A
N/A	Khaya Mthethwa	"No Air" (Chris Brown ft. Jordin Sparks)	N/A
1	Khaya Mthethwa	"Try a Little Tenderness" (Otis Redding)	80,20% (1/2)
1	Khaya Mthethwa	"The World's Greatest" (R. Kelly)	80,20% (1/2)
1	Khaya Mthethwa	"Move" (Khaya Mthethwa)	80,20% (1/2)
2	Melissa Allison	"Gabriel" (Joe Goddard)	19,80% (2/2)
2	Melissa Allison	"Sisters Are Doin' It for Themselves" (Aretha Franklin & Eurythmics)	19,80% (2/2)
2	Melissa Allison	"I Could Spend a Lifetime" (Melissa Allison)	19,80% (2/2)

== Elimination chart ==
Females	Males	Top 18	Top 10	Winner

Safe	Most votes	Safe First	Safe Last	Eliminated	Judges' Save

Stage:		Semi-Final	Finals								
Week:		7/29	8/5	8/12	8/19	8/26	9/2	9/9	9/16	9/23	9/30
Place	Contestant	Result									
1	Khaya Mthethwa	Top 10	1st 33,09%	1st 29,73%	1st 31,91%	1st 33,12%	1st 36,58%	1st 40,41%	1st 45,03%	1st 57,21%	Winner; 80,20%
2	Melissa Alison	Top 10	9th 3,29%	5th 8,80%	5th 10,13%	6th 9,67%	3rd 13,75%	3rd 14,95%	2nd 19,57%	2nd 22,09%	Runner-Up; 19,80%
3	Monde Msutwana	Top 10	6th 3,89%	6th 6,95%	6th 9,84%	3rd 12,28%	5th 12,06%	4th 14,41%	3rd 19,20%	3rd 20,71%	
4	Tshidi Tenyane	Top 10	2nd 25,01%	2nd 16,06%	3rd 11,98%	4th 11,91%	4th 12,15%	2nd 16,57%	4th 16,20%		
5	Simphiwe Gwegwe	Top 10	4th 9,01%	4th 11,46%	4th 11,15%	5th 11,51%	2nd 14,48%	5th 13,66%			
6	Shekhinah Donnell	Top 10	3rd 9,64%	3rd 12,56%	2nd 13,65%	2nd 14,94%	6th 10,98%				
7	Dominic Neill	Top 10	8th 3,40%	7th 5,63%	7th 5,67%	7th 6,57%					
8	Chloe Kiley	Top 10	5th 5,80%	8th 5,03%	8th 5,66%						
9	Nosipho Mngomezulu	Top 10	7th 3,86%	9th 3,77%							
10	Obakeng Ramaboa	Top 10	10th 3,00%								
11–18	Candy Mosoma	Elim									
11–18	Dumi Masilela	Elim									
11–18	Jean Huisman	Elim									
11–18	Maryke Buffel	Elim									
11–18	Matthew Sampson	Elim									
11–18	Siphesihle Ndaba	Elim									
11–18	Thabisa Mhlakulwana(Rich)	Elim									
11–18	Treasure Mushwana	Elim									
