= Idols South Africa season 7 =

Idols South Africa
- Season 7
- Hosted by: ProVerb
- Judges: Unathi Msengana; Gareth Cliff; Randall Abrahams
- Winner: Dave van Vuuren
- Runner-up: Mark Haze
- Finals venue: Mosaïek Teatro in Fairlands

Release
- Original network: M-Net & Mzansi Magic
- Original release: 5 June – 4 October 2011

Season chronology
- ← Previous; Season 6 Next → Season 8

Idols South Africa VII was the seventh season of South African reality interactive talent show based on the British talent show Pop Idol. It premiered on 5 June 2011. The judges returned with the addition of Unathi Msengana in the place of Mara Louw and were supported by a guest judge in every casting city.

After the auditions, call backs were held in Sun City for the golden ticket holders. After the theater, group and special guest The Parlotones rounds the final number of contestants were brought down to 16.

== Regional auditions ==
Auditions began February 2011, and were held in the following cities:

Episode Air Date	Audition City	Date	Audition Venue	Guest Judge	Tickets to Sun City
5 June 2011	Cape Town, Western Cape	12 February 2011	Cape Town International Convention Centre	Danny K	?
12 June 2011	Polokwane, Limpopo	26 February 2011	Peter Mokaba Stadium	Yvonne Chaka Chaka	?
19 June 2011	Durban, Kwazulu Natal	12 March 2011	Moses Mabhida Stadium	Kurt Darren	?
26 June 2011	Soweto, Gauteng	26 March 2011	Dobsonville Stadium	HHP	?
3 July 2011	Johannesburg, Gauteng	2 April 2011	Montecasino	HHP	?

== Wooden Mic ==
Every season the worst auditions voted for by the viewers to be part of their own Top 10 for the Wooden Mic trophy.

=== Wooden Mic Top 10 ===
	Contestant	Audition City	Result
1	Florence Nyanga	Cape Town	
2	Isaac van Wyk	Cape Town	
3	Cecilia Galane	Polokwane	
4	Lethabo Ramoroka	Polokwane	
5	Martin Mulima	Polokwane	
6	Tshami Masemolo	Polokwane	
7	Zandrie van Onselen	Durban	Winner
8	Peter Gobaknang Tebang	Gauteng	
9	Justin Payton	Gauteng	
10	Jacobus Engelbrecht	Gauteng	

== Top 16 ==
After the Parlotones performance the judges let 14 contestants know that they were through to the Top 15. With the last two contestants Josslynn Hlenti from Durban and Kerry Sanssoucie from Johannesburg left the judges let the public vote for who they wanted to see in the Top 15. The following week the results were revealed and Kerry was chosen to take up the last place in the Top 15.

== Top 15 ==
The Top 15 contestants performed a song of their own choice. The show air on 24 July 2011 and viewers had the week to vote for their Top 10.

	Contestant	Age	Hometown	Song (Original Artist)	Result
1	Dene Vorster	16	Roodepoort	"Bad Romance" (Lady Gaga)	safe
2	Erin Fourie	27	Hilton	"All These Things That I've Done" (The Killers)	safe
3	Mark Haze	28	Cape Town	"Sweet Child o' Mine" (Guns N' Roses)	safe
4	Freddie Van'Dango	22	Johannesburg	"The Scientist" (Coldplay)	safe
5	Lefa Pike	29	Kimberly	"Valerie" (Mark Ronson & Amy Winehouse)	safe
6	Crushanda Forbes	23	Cape Town	"Alone" (Heart)	safe
7	Phaksy Mngomezulu	20	Empangeni	"Broken Strings" (James Morrison)	safe
8	Dave Van Vuuren	21	Johannesburg	"With or Without You" (U2)	safe
9	Nolly Meje	24	Cape Town	"Perfect" (Pink)	safe
10	Kelly Fortuin	21	Cape Town	"Mercy" (Duffy)	safe
11	Kerry Sanssoucie	22	Johannesburg	"Don't Speak" (No Doubt)	Eliminated
12	Chloe Geldenhuys	16	Cape Town	"Raise Your Glass" (Pink)	Eliminated
13	Power Simelane	27	Soweto	"Somebody to Love" (Justin Bieber)	Eliminated
14	Kahludi Malele	29	Klipgat	"Lazy" (Bruno Mars)	Eliminated
15	Miss J	19	Durban	"Firework" (Katy Perry)	Eliminated

== Finals ==
=== Finalists ===
(ages stated at time of contest)

Contestant	Age	Hometown	Voted Off	Spectacular Theme
Nolly Meje	24	Cape Town	8 Aug 2011	Radio Chart Toppers
Phaksy Mngomezulu	20	Empangeni	16 Aug 2011	Homebrew
Dene Vorster	16	Roodepoort	30 Aug 2011	Gospel
Erin Fourie	27	Hilton	30 Aug 2011	Gospel
Kelly Fortuin	21	Cape Town	6 Sep 2011	Showstopper!
Lefa Pike	29	Kimberly	13 Sep 2011	Rock
Freddie Van'Dango	22	Johannesburg	20 Sep 2011	Grammy-Nominated songs
Crushanda Forbes	23	Cape Town	27 Sep 2011	Top Threes Terrific Trio
Mark Haze	28	Cape Town	Runner-up	Finale
Dave Van Vuuren	21	Johannesburg	Winner	Finale

=== Top 10 – Radio Chart Toppers ===
The Top 10 performance was recorded live on Friday 5 August 2011 at the Mosaïek Teatro in Fairlands, Johannesburg and aired on Sunday 7 August 2011.
The results show was aired live on Tuesday 9 August 2011. With guest acts from Idols season 6's third place Sindi Nene and The Black Hotels.

Guest Judge: Ziyon (Liqiudeep)

Order	Contestant	Song (Original Artist)	Result
1	Mark Haze	"Born This Way" (Lady Gaga)	Safe
2	Freddie Van'Dango	"Human" (The Killers)	Safe
3	Nolly Meje	"Mama Do" (Pixie Lott)	Eliminated
4	Erin Fourie	"Hey Ya!" (Outkast)	Safe
5	Lefa Pike	"Grace Kelly" (Mika)	Bottom 2
6	Dene Vorster	"Someone Like You" (Adele)	Safe
7	Phaksy Mngomezulu	"How You Remind Me" (Nickelback)	Safe
8	Kelly Fortuin	"Leave Right Now" (Will Young)	Safe
9	Crushanda Forbes	"My Life Would Suck Without You" (Kelly Clarkson)	Bottom 3
10	Dave Van Vuuren	"Sex On Fire" (Kings Of Leon)	Safe

=== Top 9 – Homegrew ===
The Top 9 performance was recorded live on Friday 12 August 2011 at the Mosaïek Teatro in Fairlands, Johannesburg and aired on Sunday 14 August 2011.
The results show was aired live on Tuesday 16 August 2011. Guest Judge Cofield Mundi performed during the results show and sang a song she specially composed for Idols.

Guest Judge: Cofield Mundi

Order	Contestant	Song (Original Artist)	Result
1	Erin Fourie	"Fine Again" (Saran Gas)	Bottom 2
2	Crushanda Forbes	"Why" (Garth Taylor)	
3	Mark Haze	"Shallow Waters" (Just Jinjer)	
4	Dave Van Vuuren	"Blue Eyes" (Springbok Nude Girls)	
5	Lefa Pike	"Too Late For Mama" (Brenda Fassie)	Bottom 3
6	Freddie Van'Dango	"Against All Odds" (aKing)	
7	Phaksy Mngomezulu	"I Want You" (Loyiso)	Eliminated
8	Kelly Fortuin	"I’d Like" (Freshly Ground)	
9	Dene Vorster	"Afrikaans" (Flash Republic ft. Foto Na Dans)	

=== Top 8 – R’n’B in All Its Diversity ===
The Top 8 were mentored in the finer points of R’n’B by South African legend Loyiso Bala, who performed with them as a special guest artist.
The Top 8 performance was recorded live on Friday 19 August 2011 at the Mosaïek Teatro in Fairlands, Johannesburg and aired on Sunday 21 August 2011.
The results show was aired live on Tuesday 23 August 2011.

Guest Performer: Loyiso Bala

Order	Contestant	Song (Original Artist)	Result
1	Kelly Fortuin	"Rock with You" (Michael Jackson)	"Saved"
2	Dave Van Vuuren	"Sexual Healing" (Marvin Gaye)	
3	Dene Vorster	"Voice Within" (Christina Aguilera)	Bottom Two
4	Mark Haze	"Just The Way You Are" (Bruno Mars)	
5	Erin Fourie	"Halo" (Beyoncé)	
6	Lefa Pike	"Ordinary People" (John Legend)	
7	Crushanda Forbes	"I Learned from the Best" (Whitney Houston)	Bottom Three
8	Freddie Van'Dango	"Rehab" (Amy Winehouse)	

=== Top 8 – Mzansi Youth Choir ===
The Top 8 took to the stage again after Kelly was saved by the judges. The Top 8 got a little help from the Mzansi Youth Choir, who provided the backing vocals for the Idols. James Blunt also performed during the show.
The Top 8 performance was recorded live on Friday 19 August 2011 at the Mosaïek Teatro in Fairlands, Johannesburg and aired on Sunday 21 August 2011.
The results show was aired live on Tuesday 23 August 2011.
Two Contestants were eliminated, due to the judges using there one safe vote the week before.

Backing Vocals: Mzansi Youth Choir
Guest Performer: James Blunt
Guest Judge: Chante Moore

Order	Contestant	Song (Original Artist)	Result
1	Crushanda Forbes	"I Believe I Can Fly" (R. Kelly)	Safe
2	Erin Fourie	"Put A Little Love In Your Heart" (Jackie DeShannon)	Eliminated
3	Dene Vorster	"(Your Love Keeps Lifting Me) Higher and Higher" (Jackie Wilson)	Eliminated
4	Freddie Van'Dango	"Forget You" (Cee Lo Green)	Safe
5	Kelly Fortuin	"I Knew You Were Waiting (For Me)" (Aretha Franklin & George Michael)	Safe
6	Dave Van Vuuren	"Bridge Over Troubled Water" (Simon & Garfunkel)	Safe
7	Lefa Pike	"Lean on Me" (Bill Withers)	Safe
4	Mark Haze	"Somebody To Love" (Queen)	Safe

=== Top 6 – Showstopper! ===
The Top 6 will take to the stage after Erin and Dene was voted off the previous week in a double elimination.
The Top 6 performance will be recorded live on Friday 2 September 2011 at the Mosaïek Teatro in Fairlands, Johannesburg and aired on Sunday 4 September 2011.
The results show will be aired live on Tuesday 6 September 2011.

Guest Judge: LeAnne

Order	Contestant	Song (Original Artist)	Result
1	Freddie Van'Dango	"Seven Nation Army" (White Stripes)	Bottom two
2	Kelly Fortuin	"American Boy" (Estelle Feat. Kanye West)	Eliminated
3	Lefa Pike	"Miss Independent" (Ne-Yo)	Safe
4	Dave Van Vuuren	"Hound Dog" (Willie Mae "Big Mama" Thornton)	Bottom three
5	Mark Haze	"If I Had You" (Adam Lambert)	Safe
6	Crushanda Forbes	"Release Me" (Agnes)	Safe

=== Top 5 – Rock ===
Every Contastant will perform two songs.
The Top 5 performance will be recorded live on Friday 9 September 2011 at the Mosaïek Teatro in Fairlands, Johannesburg and aired on Sunday 11 September 2011.
The results show will be aired live on Tuesday 13 September 2011.

Guest Judge: Locnville

Order	Contestant	First Song (Original Artist)	Second Song (Original Artist)	Result
1	Mark Haze	"Pour Some Sugar On Me" (Def Leppard)	"Dream On" (Aerosmith)	Bottom Two
2	Crushanda Forbes	"Simply The Best" (Tina Turner)	"Because of You" (Kelly Clarkson)	Safe
3	Lefa Pike	"Don't Stop Me Now" (Queen)	"The Man Who Can't Be Moved" (The Script)	Eliminated
4	Dave Van Vuuren	"Iris" (Goo Goo Dolls)	"Come Together" (The Beatles)	Safe
5	Freddie Van'Dango	"Scar Tissue" (Red Hot Chili Peppers)	"(I Can't Get No) Satisfaction" (The Rolling Stones)	Bottom Three

=== Top 4 – Grammy-Nominated songs ===
Every Contastant will perform two songs. And there will be two duets
The Top 4 performance will be recorded live on Friday 16 September 2011 at the Mosaïek Teatro in Fairlands, Johannesburg and aired on Sunday 18 September 2011.
The results show will be aired live on Tuesday 20 September 2011.

Guest Judge: Craig David

Order	Contestant	First Song (Original Artist)	Second Song (Original Artist)	Result
1	Dave Van Vuuren	"Streets of Philadelphia" (Bruce Springsteen)	"Beautiful Day" (U2)	Bottom two
2	Crushanda Forbes	"Because You Loved Me" (Celine Dion)	"You Belong With Me" (Taylor Swift)	Safe
3	Freddie Van'Dango	"Kiss From A Rose" (Seal)	"Use Somebody" (Kings Of Leon)	Eliminated
4	Mark Haze	"Heard It Through The Grapevine" (Marvin Gaye)	"The Pretender" (Foo Fighters)	Safe
N/A	Dave Van Vuuren & Freddie Van'Dango	"Don't Give Up" (John Legend & Pink)		N/A
N/A	Mark Haze & Crushanda Forbes	"Fields Of Gold" (Michael Bolton & Eva Cassidy)		N/A

=== Top 3 – Top Threes Terrific Trio ===
Every Contastant performed three songs. One of each contestant's songs has been chosen for them based on the year in which they were born.

Sterling EQ accompanied the Idols in two of their three songs.

The Top 3 performance was recorded live on Friday 23 September 2011 at the Mosaïek Teatro in Fairlands, Johannesburg and aired on Sunday 25 September 2011.
The results show was aired live on Tuesday 27 September 2011.

Guest Judge: HHP

Order	Contestant	First Song (Original Artist)	Second Song (Original Artist)	Third Song (Original Artist) - Year of Birth	Result
1	Mark Haze	"Roxanne" (The Police)	"Eleanor Rigby" (The Beatles)	"Open Arms" (Journey) - 1982	Safe
2	Crushanda Forbes	"Songbird" (Fleetwood Mac)	"It's Raining Men" (Martha Wash feat. RuPaul)	"I Just Can't Stop Loving You" (Michael Jackson) - 1987	Eliminated
3	Dave Van Vuuren	"Mr. Jones" (Counting Crows)	"Vincent" (Don McLean)	"Enjoy The Silence" (Depeche Mode) - 1990	Safe

=== Top 2 – Finale ===
The Top 2 Contestants performed three songs. Both Dave and Mark were allowed to choose their favourite performance from any stage of the Idols competition. The Top 2 were accompanied by one of SA's biggest bands, The Parlotones. And both of them performed their single.

The Top 2 performance was recorded live on Friday 30 September 2011 at the Mosaïek Teatro in Fairlands, Johannesburg and aired on Sunday 2 October 2011.
The results show was aired live on Tuesday 4 October 2011.

Guest Judge:

Contestant	First Song (Original Artist)- Favourite song	Second Song (Original Artist) - Parlotones Song	Third Song (Original Artist) - Single	Result	Vote %
Dave Van Vuuren	"Sex On Fire" (Kings Of Leon) - Top 10	"Should We Fight Back" (The Parlotones)	"Hall of Mirrors" (Dave Van Vuuren)	Winner	50.49%
Mark Haze	"Dream On" (Aerosmith) - Top 5	"Burning Love" (The Parlotones)	"Out of My Head" (Mark Haze)	Runner-Up	49.51%

== Elimination Chart ==
Legend
Did Not Perform	Female	Male	Top 16	Top 10	Winner

Safe	Safe First	Safe Last	Eliminated	Judges' Save

Stage:		Semi		Finals								
Week:		7/17	7/24	8/7	8/14	8/21	8/28	9/4	9/11	9/18	9/25	10/2
Place	Contestant	Result										
1	Dave van Vuuren		Viewers					Btm 3		Btm 2		Winner
2	Mark Haze		Viewers						Btm 3			Runner Up
3	Crushanda Forbes		Viewers	Btm 3		Btm 3					Elim	
4	Freddie Van'Dango		Judges					Btm 2	Btm 2	Elim		
5	Lefa Pike		Viewers	Btm 2	Btm 3				Elim			
6	Kelly Fortuin		Viewers			Saved		Elim				
7-8	Dene Vorster		Judges			Btm 2	Elim					
7-8	Erin Fourie		Judges		Btm 2		Elim					
9	Phaksy Mngomezulu		Viewers		Elim							
10	Nolly Meje		Viewers	Elim								
11-15	Chloe Geldenhuys		Elim									
11-15	Kahludi Malele		Elim									
11-15	Kerry Sanssoucie		Elim									
11-15	Miss J		Elim									
11-15	Power Simelane		Elim									
16	Josslynn Hlenti	Elim										
