= 29th Annual South African Music Awards =

2023 award ceremony

29th South African
- Date: November 18, 2023
- Location: Sun Bet Arena
- Country: South Africa
- Hosted by: DJ Sabby; Nomalanga Shozi
- Most nominations: AKA (7)

The 29th Annual South African Music Awards is the 29th ceremony of the South African Music Awards. The ceremony was aired live on SABC 1 on November 18, 2023 hosted by DJ Sabby and Nomalanga Shozi at SunBet Arena.

Nominees were announced on October 3, 2023, live on YouTube. The late AKA leads the nominees with 7 nominations for his posthumous album Mass Country, ahead of K.O with six nominations.

== Background ==
29th South African Music Awards delayed due to financial difficulties, unlike other years nominations are announced on the first quarter.

Nominees were announced on October 3, 2023, live on YouTube at Soweto State Theater.

The ceremony was planned to be held at Durban ICC Arena on November 18 and broadcast live on SABC 1. Later was announced that the venue is changed to Sun Bet Arena.

== Winners and nominees ==
Below is the full list of nominees. Winners are listed first bold face.

Female Artist of the Year	Male Artist of the Year
Ntokozo Mbambo – Lavish Worship; Kelly Khumalo – From A God To A King; Sincerely Anne – To Whom it May Concern; Hle – Take Heart; Thandi Ntuli – Blk Elijah & The Children of Meroë	AKA – Mass Country; Kabza De Small – KOA II Part 1; Sjava – Isibuko; K.O – SR3; Lloyiso – Seasons
Duo or Group of the Year	Newcomer of the Year
DJ Maphorisa and Kabza De Small – Scorpion Kings Live Sun Arena; DJ Maphorisa and Visca – Ba Straata; Venom and Shishiliza – Love Is Pain; Mafikizolo – Idwala; Msaki and Tubatsi – Synthetic Hearts	Myztro – 2.0 Nkwari; Blakka Yut – Unleashed; Sincerely Anne – To Whom it May Concern; Lloyiso – Seasons; Venom and Shishiliza – Love Is Pain
Album of the Year	Best Engineered Album
Lavish Worship – Ntokozo Mbambo; Mass Country – AKA; SR3 – K.O; Isibuko – Sjava; KOA II Part 1 – Kabza De Small	Mass Country– AKA (engineered & produced by Robin Kohl and Itu); To Whom it May Concern – Sincerely Anne (engineered and produced by Tjaart van der Walt and Daniel Baron); Kanniedood – Francois van Coke (engineered & produced by Taylor Soundworks); Blk Elijah & The Children of Meroë – Thandi Ntuli (engineered & produced by Shane, Tshepo, Thandi & Clinton); Isibuko – Sjava, (engineered & produced by Ruff)
Best African Adult Contemporary Album	Best Alternative Album
Usiba Lwe Gazi – Nathi; Celebrating African Song – Dumza Maswana; Smile – Choko; I am Gold – S'nazo; Ubuhle Ubuhle – Lethiwe Sithole	On the Romance of Being – Desire Marea; Glitch Vol 2: The Future Is Now – uBeyond; Synthetic Hearts – Msaki and Tubatsi; Blue Lawns – The Great Yawn; Leaving All The Time – Bye Beneco
Best Amapiano Album	Best Classical/Instrumental Album
KOA II Part 1 – Kabza De Small; Amukelani – Kelvin Momo; Ba Straata – DJ Maphorisa and Visca; 2.0 Nkwari – Myztro; Scorpion Kings Live Sun Arena – DJ Maphorisa and Kabza De Small	Fire Beast – Vox Chamber Choir and Franco Prinsloo; Live in Europe 22 – CH2; One Night On Earth – Derek Gripper; Maike – Juliet String Quartet; Sanctuary – Carol Thorns
Best Collaboration	Best Pop Album
AKA featuring Nasty C – "Lemons (Lemonade)"; K.O, Young Stunna featuring Blxckie – "Sete"; DJ Maphorisa and Visca featuring 2woshortrsa, Stompiiey, ShaunMusiQ, Ftears and Madumane – "Ba Straata"; Mörda featuring Oscar Mbo and Murumba Pitch – "Mohigan Sun"; AKA featuring Kiddominant – "Company"	Seasons – Lloyiso; Things We Don't Talk About – Jimmy Nevis; Heard You Got Love – Jeremy Loops; Game Over – Tyler Page; Petrichor – Amy Lilley
Best Produced Album	Best Produced Music Video
KOA II Part 1 – Kabza De Small (producer: Leslie George Theko, Artwork Sound, Da Muziqal Chef, Mdu aka TRP, Stakev, DJ Maphorisa and Felo Le Tee); Things We Don’t Talk About – Jimmy Nevis (producer: Darren Petersen); Amukelani – Kelvin Momo (producer: Kelvin Momo); Lindokuhle – Mlindo the Vocalist (producer: Mthunzi, Howard, Herc, Tshepo Morone, DJ Maphorisa, Masiano); Isibuko – Sjava (producer: Delayde, Ruff, Jah Cool)	"Shine" – Elaine (producer: Shayna Gianelli; director: Jesse Ray Diamond); "Lemons (Lemonade)" – AKA featuring Nasty C (producer: Tebogo Mabaso; director: Nate Thomas); "SETE" – K.O featuring Young Stunna & Blxckie (producer: K.O, Tsholofelo Moremedi, Ted Magerman; director: Ted Magerman); "Be Free" – Desire Marea (producer: Will Nicholson; Director: Imraan Christian; "Been Thinking" – Tyla (producer: Jimi Adesanya; director: Meiji Alabi)
Best Reggae Album	Beste Kontemporere Musiek Album
Unleashed – Blakka Yut; Youth's Cry – Botanist Mr Lamington; Red Carpet Live – Maximum Stylez; Flight More Riddim – Blackness Blue Productions; Healing – Lavoro Duro	Toe Roep Ek Jou Naam – Jan Blohm & Ryno Velvet; Sing, Hoop, Weerklink – Prop; Skree Net Sag – Alter Ego; Ep In F – Herman Kleinhans; Jagvat – Jan Rhaap
Remix of the Year	Best Gqom Album
"Ndinovalo" – Mörda, Yallunder; "SETE" – K.O featuring Young Stunna, Oxlade & Diamond Platnumz; "Hayii" (Citizen Deep Remix) – Citizen Deep X Mzux Maen ft Yasmin Levy; "Au Dede" – Karyendasoul; "Tobesta Remake" – Myztro featuring Focalistic, Daliwonga, Shaunmusiq and Ftears	Meeting with the King – DJ Lag; Fikelephi – Sizwe Mdlalose; Love & Light – Cairo CPT; Nande 2.0 – DJ Sandiso; Ithuba – Newlandz Finest
Best African Indigenous Faith Album	Best Hip Hop Album
Emmanuel – JTG Gospel Choir; Mantswe A Supileng – Spiritual Gospel Choir; Ikhoni Mfuyo – In Zion of Christ; Ba Ya Mo Nyatsa – Wacha Mkhukhu Wachumlilo; Ntate Le Rato La Hao – Ingqayizivele Gospel Choir	Religion– MashBeatz; Mass Country – AKA; SR3 – K.O; Life is Gangsta – Thato Saul; Diaspora – Maglera Doe Boy
Best Jazz Album	Best Kwaito Album
In the Spirit of Ntu – Nduduzo Makhathini; Isambulu – Linda Sikhakhane; Blk Elija & The Children of Meroe – Thandi Ntuli; The 1st Gospel – Mthunzi Mvubu; Finish the Sun – Shane Cooper and Mabuta	Speak n Vrostaan – Kwesta and Kabza De Small; R Mashesha – Big Nuz; I Am Who I Am – Nkiyase; Jukebox – Shisaboy; Barabbas – Taylor K
Best Maskandi Album	Best R&B Album
Umqhele Nethawula – Khuzani; Ngeke Ungiphathe – Menzi; Is' khiye Se-Coldroom – Thokozani Langa; Iphakade Lami – Abafana Bakamgqumeni; Home Alone – Inkos'yamagcokama	But Could The Moments in Between – Ndumiso Manana; Germander II – Lesego Kyle Mnyandu; 4LUV (Deluxe) – Sihle Sithole; Bad Weather – Nanette Siphesihle; Passion Fruit – Kabomo
Best Traditional Album	Best Adult Contemporary Album
African Queen 2.0–Makhadzi; Ke Bone Molelo O Timile – MmaAusi; A Reyeng Bahurutshe – Oarabele France Makgore; Obe Happy – Molebatsi Tsotetsi; Inkabi Nation – Big Zulu, Lwah Ndlunkulu, Xowla, Siya Ntuli	Dark Secrets – Louise Carver; Bait For Steps Forward – Nobuhle Ashanti; Memories – Drakensberg Boys Choir; Ndikhethiwe – Vusi Nova; Love – Viwo Kulati
Best Dance Album	Best Afro-pop Album
Asante – Mörda; Next Level – Russell Zuma; The Gospel According to Artwork Sounds – Grain; WL4OM – Karyendasoul; A New Dawn – Siyanda Makanya	Isibuko – Sjava; From A God to A King – Kelly Khumalo; Idwala – Mafikizolo; Love is Pain – Venom; Ekhayakomama – Philadlozi Mfekayi
Best Rock Album	Best Traditional Faith Album
Kanniedood – Francois Van Coke; Fine Thanks, and You? – Russell Coward; Hellcats – End of Days – Warwick Rautenbach/Alessandro Benigno; Fuzigish – Malcolm King; Testify – Basson Laubscher	The Overflow – Dumi Mkokstad; Hoja Ke Sena Wena – IPCC; Ndiyabulela – Tsholofelo Ntuli; The Grace Encounter Vol. 1 – Phumulani Radebe; Sedi Laka – Brown Mosiapoa
Best Contemporary Faith Album	Beste Pop
Lavish Worship – Ntokozo Mbambo; Mhalamhala – Brenden Praise; Take Heart – Hle; Restored: The Jesus Collective – The Jesus Collective; Hope – Vincent Jiyane	Jona – Bernice van der Westhuizen; Insomnia – Brendan Peyper; Loufi Flippen Loufi – Ifan-Luc Carlo Handel; Hittegolf – Brandon Eloff; Die Onbekende – Renier van der Westhuizen

== Special awards ==
=== Rest of Africa Award ===
- Sad Romance – CKay
- Timeless – Davido
- Worry – Lyre
- Dynastie – Ferre Gola
- Sounds of Peace – Moreira Chonguiça

=== International Achievement Awards ===
- Zakes Bantwini
- Wouter Kellerman
- Nomcebo Zikode

=== Lifetime Achievement Awards ===
- Pops Mohmmed
- Gloria Bosman
- Mandoza
- Ihhashi Elimhlophe

=== SAMRO Highest AirPlay Composer ===
- "SETE" - K.O (featuring Young Stunna, Blxckie)

=== Capasso Most Streamed Song ===
- "SETE" - K.O (featuring Young Stunna, Blxckie)
