= Mkhululi Bhebhe =

Zimbabwean gospel music vocalist

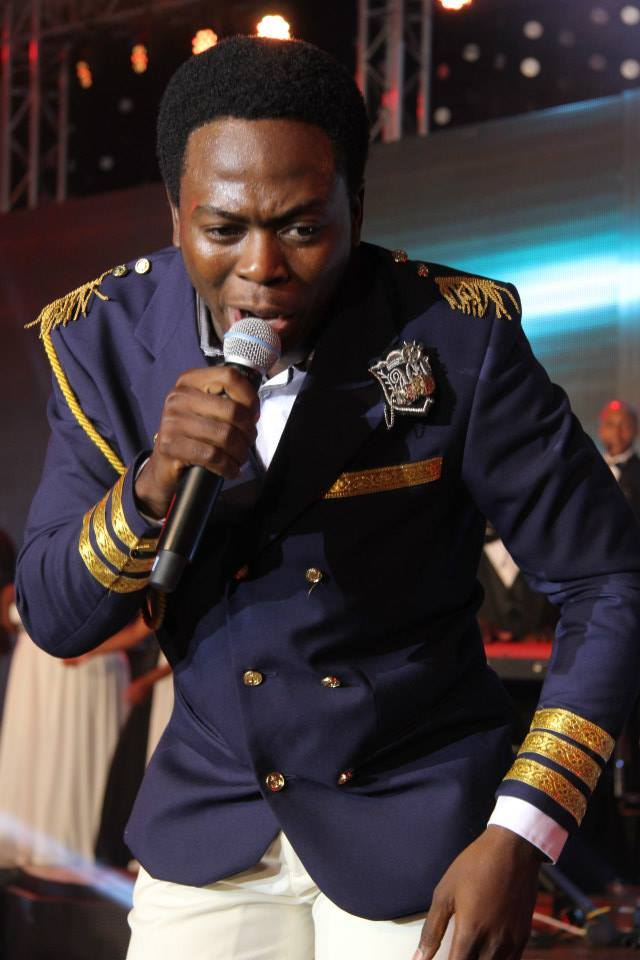
Image of Mkhululi Bhebhe

Mkhululi Bhebhe (born 5 April 1984 in Bulawayo, Zimbabwe) is a Zimbabwean contemporary gospel music vocalist.

== Career ==
In 2008, Bhebhe entered the East and Southern African Idols show held in Nairobi, Kenya, and placed sixth.

In 2009, Bhebhe began performing with the South African gospel choir Joyous Celebration. He has performed traditional Zimbabwean gospel songs on the international scene, including Tambira Jehovah, Ichokwadi, Namata and Wasara Wasara.

Bhebhe joined the group Joyous Celebration in 2010.

In December 2012, Bhebhe released an album, iChokwadi with thirteen tracks, including "Thelumoya" and "Tambira Jehovah".

As of 2015 Bhebhe's most popular song with Joyous Celebration is titled "Tambira Jehovah".

In 2016 Bhebhe headlined the Celestial Praiz 2016 gospel event.
