= Moreira Chonguiça =

Mozambican jazz saxophonist (born 1977)

Moreira Chonguiça is a Mozambican jazz saxophonist. In 2010 he started a jazz festival, Morejazz, in Maputo; artists invited to play at the festival also hold master-classes at the Eduardo Mondlane University of the city. In June 2010 his group The Moreira Project opened the Standard Bank Jazz Festival in Grahamstown in the Eastern Cape. He collaborated with Manu Dibango on the album M & M, which was released in 2017.

== Discography ==
- The Moreira Project Vol 1 - The Journey (2005)
- The Moreira Project Vol 2 - Citizen of the World (2009)
- Khanimambo (2011)
- MP Reloaded (2013)
- Sensasons (2014)
- Live at Polana Serena Hotel (2015)
- M & M: Moreira Chonguica & Manu Dibango (2017)
