= Thato Saul =

South African rapper and songwriter

- Born: Thato Matlebyane; 12 December 1995 (age 30); Saulsville, Pretoria West, South Africa
- Occupations: Rapper; singer; songwriter; record producer
- Years active: 2014–present
- Awards: South African Hip Hop Awards (Freshman of the Year. 2022)
- Musical career
- Also known as: Thato Mathata, Byor bo dese & Byor bothata
- Genre: Hip hop
- Instruments: Vocals
- Labels: OuttaThisWorld ENT; 4THAMEMBERS Records
- Website: IG.com/thatosaul

Thato Matlebyane (born 12 December 1995), (Note: In a 2016 interview he said he was turning 21 in December, which makes him born in 1995) professionally known as Thato Saul (/tˈərˈtoʊ ˈsθl/) is a South African rapper and songwriter who rose to prominence subsequent to the release of "Never Ride" by Mashbeatz after the single went viral on a video sharing platform TikTok.

In 2022 Matlebyane received a total of six nominations from the South African Hip Hop Awards of which he won three out of six nominations. He was named the best freshman and newcomer. He made a guest appearance on the posthumous studio album MASS COUNTRY by AKA with a song titled "Mbuzi (Freesyle)" which left fans and listeners asking "who is Thato Saul?".

== Awards and nominations ==
Year	Award ceremony	Category	Recipient/Nominated work	Results	Ref.
2022	11th South African Hip Hop Awards	Album of the Year	Life is Gangsta	Won	
2022	11th South African Hip Hop Awards	Best Newcomer/Freshman of the Year	Himself	Won	
2022	11th South African Hip Hop Awards	Best remix	"Never Ride Remix"	Won	
2022	11th South African Hip Hop Awards	Song of the Year	"Never Ride"	Nominated	
2022	11th South African Hip Hop Awards	Best Collabo	"Never Ride"	Nominated	
2022	11th South African Hip Hop Awards	Best Male	Himself	Nominated	
