= Skwatta Kamp =

South African hip-hop group

Skwatta Kamp is a South African seven member hip-hop group, which was founded in 1996 and released their last album in 2023. The group consisted of Infa, Nish, Shugasmakx, Flabba, Nemza, Slikour, and Bozza, some of whom have gone on to release solo projects. The group released four albums and a single mixtape during its existence. Their debut album, Khut En Joyn, was released in 2002 and was followed up by Mkhukhu Funkshen in 2003, which sold over 77 000 copies and was considered as their best album work. It was followed by Washumkhukhu the following year and finally five years later, Fair And Skwear was released. The group has won numerous awards for their work including two SAMA awards for best rap album and a channel O best hiphop music video award. In March 2015, Nkululeko Habedi known as "Flabba", died after being stabbed by his girlfriend Sindisiwe Manqele, who is currently serving her sentence for murder. In February 2021, Musawenkosi 'Nish' Molefe died from COVID-19 complications.
