= Flora Park =

Suburb in South Africa

- City
- Flora Park
- Motto: See the Light from Afar.
- Location within Limpopo Location within South Africa Location within Africa Location within Earth
- Coordinates: 23.9125°S 29.4975°E
- Country: South Africa
- Province: Limpopo
- District: Capricorn
- Municipality: Polokwane Municipality
- Main Place: Polokwane

Government
  - Executive Mayor: Thembi Nkadimeng (ANC)
  - Mayor: John Mpe

Area
  - Total: 4.09 km^{2} (1.58 sq mi)

Population (2011)
  - Total: 11,566
  - Density: 2,830/km^{2} (7,320/sq mi)
- Demonym: Parkers

Racial makeup (2011)
  - Black African: 81.87%
  - White: 15.91%
  - Coloured: 1.13%
  - Indian/Asian: 0.99%
  - Other: 15.97%

First languages (2011)
  - Sepedi: 52.16%
  - Afrikaans: 17.93%
  - Xitsonga: 7.36%
  - English: 6.58%
  - Other: 16.15%
- Time zone: UTC+2 (SAST)
- Postal code (street): 0699
- PO box: 0700
- Area code: 015
- Bird: Northern royal albatross
- Flower: Blue squill
- Website: Official website

Flora Park, is a suburb (sub-area) situated in Polokwane under the Capricorn District Municipality in the Limpopo province of South Africa.

== Education ==
- Flora Park Comprehensive High School.
- Northern Academy Primary School.
- Northern Academy Secondary School.
