= Ntokozo Mbambo =

South African gospel artist

- Born: November 6, 1985 (age 40); Umlazi, KwaZulu-Natal, South Africa
- Origin: Durban
- Genres: Gospel, Urban gospel
- Occupation: singer-songwriter
- Instrument: vocals
- Years active: 2001–present
- Labels: Koko Records
- Formerly of: Joyous Celebration
- Spouse: Nqubeko Mbatha (m. 2008)

Ntokozo Mbambo (born 6 November 1985) is a South African singer-songwriter. Born and raised in Umlazi, Mbambo professional music career began as a member and lead singer of the gospel group Joyous Celebration at the age of 15.

She made her on-screen debut as a judge in I Want to Sing Gospel (2014) and Idols SA season 17 (2021). Her accolades includes 5 South African Music Awards, 6 African Gospel Music and Media Awards, 2 Crown Gospel Music Awards, 2 Praise Achievement Awards, 1 Metro FM Music Awards, and 1 Basadi in Music Awards.

== Life and career ==
Mbambo was born on the 6th of November 1985 in the township of Umlazi in Durban, South Africa. Her music interest began at her early age and joined South African gospel choir Joyous Celebration as lead singer at the age 15 of in 2002 became youngest member at the time.

Mbambo studied and obtained a degree in Information Technology programming at the Durban North Varsity College in 2006. She also attended the University of Zululand and graduated with a Bachelor of Education (BEd) in English Language and Literature/Letters and Social Sciences.

Mbambo released her debut studio album Bambelela in 2001.

Her live album Keep on Believing, was released in 2007. It earned her nominations at Metro FM Music Awards for Best Gospel Album and three nominations at the 2007 Crown Gospel Music Awards.

Following her departure with Joyous Celebration in 2011, Mbambo signed with Koko Records and began working on her solo studio album following year in 2012.

Filled was recorded at a Lyric Theatre concert and released in 2012. The album was certified Double Platinum in South Africa.

She bagged her first television role as a judge on the third season of the SABC 2 Gospel reality competition I Want to Sing Gospel in 2014.

Her fourth studio album Spirit and Life was released on 10 October 2015. It received nominations for Album of Excellence, Female Artiste of Excellence and won Artiste Of Excellence Southern Africa, Event of Excellence at the 2017 ceremony of African Gospel Music and Media Awards.

In July 2021, Mbambo appeared on Idols SA season 17 as a guest judge.

In early November 2022, Mbambo announced her surprise studio album via Instagram.

Moments in Time was released 6 November 2018 digitally.

Her studio album Lavish Worship, was released 21 March 2023. Lavish Worship won three awards for Female Artist of the Year, Album of the Year and Best Contemporary Faith album of the Year at the 29th South African Music Awards.

In addition, Lavish Worship was nominated for Best Female and won Best Gospel Album at the 18th Metro FM Music Awards.

In early July 2024, Mbambo performed South African National Anthem for Springboks at Hollywoodbets Kings Park Stadium, Durban.

== Personal life ==
Mbambo married music producer Nqubeko Mbatha on 17 May 2008.

Towards the end of December 2024, Mbambo gave a birth to a girl.

== Filmography ==
=== Television ===
Year	Film/Sopie	Role	title
2014	I Want to Sing Gospel		
2021	Idols SA	Guest Judge	

== Discography ==
=== Studio albums ===
- Filled (2012)
- Gospel Hits (2014)
- Spirit and Life (2015)
- The Anniversary Project (2018)
- Lavish Worship (2023)

=== Live albums ===
- Keep On Believing (2013)
- Moments in Time (2018)
- The First Noël (2020)
- Makabongwe: The Sound of Revival (2023)

== Achievements ==
=== African Entertainment Awards USA ===
Year	Nominee / work	Award	Result	Ref.
2023	Herself	Best Gospel Artist	Nominated	

=== African Gospel Music and Media Awards ===
Year	Nominee / work	Award	Result	Ref.
2013	Filled	Album of the Year	Won	
2013	Herself	Female Artist of the Year	Won	
2017	Spirit and Life	Album of Excellence	Nominated	
2017	Herself	Female Artiste of Excellence	Nominated	
2017	Herself	Artiste Of Excellence Southern Africa	Won	
2017	Spirit and Life (Live)	Event of Excellence	Won	
2019	Herself	Artist of Excellence Southern Africa	Won	
2019	Herself	Female Artist of Excellence	Won	

=== Basadi in Music Awards ===
Year	Nominee / work	Award	Result	Ref.
2023	"Ngcwele Nkosi"	Gospel Artist of the Year	Won	

=== Crown Gospel Music Awards ===
Year	Nominee / work	Award	Result	Ref.
2008	Herself	Best Praise and Worship	Nominated	
2008	Herself	Best Gospel Artist	Nominated	
2008	Herself	Best Female Gospel Artist	Nominated	
2011	"In The Shadow"	Classic Of All Times	Won	
2012	Herself	Best Gospel Female	Won	
2012	Herself	Best Gospel Artist	Won	
2012	iNxaniwe	Best Worship Album	Nominated	
2012	Inxaniwe	Best Gospel Song	Nominated	
2013	Herself	Best Gospel Artist	Nominated	

=== Praise Achievement Awards ===
Year	Nominee / work	Award	Result	Ref.
2023	Herself	Artiste Of The Year	Won	
2023	Herself	Global Honorary Award	Won	

=== Metro FM Music Awards ===
Year	Nominee / work	Award	Result	Ref.
2007	Keep on Believing	Best Gospel Album	Won	
2024	Lavish Worship	Best Gospel Album	Won	
2024	Lavish Worship	Best Female	Nominated	

=== South African Music Awards ===
Year	Nominee / work	Award	Result	Ref.
2013	Filled	Best Contemporary Faith Music Album	Won	
2013	Filled	Album of the Year	Nominated	
2013	Filled	Female Artist of the Year	Nominated	
2016	Spirit and Life	Best Contemporary Faith Music Album	Won	
2023	Lavish Worship	Album of the Year	Won	
2023	Lavish Worship	Best Contemporary Faith album of the year	Won	
2023	Lavish Worship	Female Artist of the Year	Won	
