= 25K =

South African rapper

25K the Plug
- Born: Lehlohonolo Molefe; September 28, 1994 (age 31) (Note: The first source states that the rapper celebrated his 27th birthday. The article was published on the 28th of September 2021, which implies that he was born in 1994, and the second source (Hype magazine) states that he was born on the 28th of September 1994.); Atteridgeville, Pretoria, South Africa
- Other names: Choko-5K; 25K the Plug; Don Kilograms; Kilo
- Occupations: Rapper; record producer; singer; songwriter; composer
- Years active: 2017- present
- Musical career
- Genres: Hip hop
- Instruments: Vocals
- Labels: Sony Music Africa; Universal Music South Africa; South African Recordings; Kennel Music

Lehlohonolo Molefe, known professionally as 25K (or 25K the Plug), is a South African rapper and record producer. He is best known for his 2017 single "Culture Vulture", which surfaced in early 2019. Its remix features AKA and Emtee, and was also remixed by Boity Thulo.

In 2021, 25K released his debut album, Pheli Makaveli, with Zoocci Coke Dope. It was released under Sony Music, after signing a record deal with the label.

== Discography ==
=== Studio albums ===
Title	Type	Album details	Certification
Pheli Makaveli	Studio album	Release date: 2021; Label: Sony Music Africa; Formats: Digital download	
Loyal to the Plug: The Life & Times of Don Kilogram	Studio album	• Release date: 2024 • Label: Sony Music Africa • Formats: Digital download	

== Awards and nominations ==
Year	Award ceremony	Prize	Recipient/Nominated work	Results	Ref.
2021	South African Hip Hop Awards	Album of the Year	Pheli Makaveli	Nominated	
2021	South African Hip Hop Awards	Freshman of the Year	Pheli Makaveli	Nominated	
2021	South African Hip Hop Awards	Best Male	Himself	Nominated	
2021	South African Hip Hop Awards	Best Collabo	Husters Prayer	Nominated	
2021	South African Hip Hop Awards	Best Video	Husters Prayer	Nominated	
2021	South African Hip Hop Awards	Best Remix	081's Finest (Remix)	Nominated	
