= List of Billboard number-one dance songs of 2016 =

Billboard magazine compiled the top-performing dance songs in the United States during 2016 on the Hot Dance/Electronic Songs, the Dance Club Songs, and the Dance/Mix Show Airplay. The oldest dance music chart, the Dance Club Songs was first published in 1976, ranking the most popular songs on dance club based on reports from a national sample of club DJs. The Dance/Mix Show Airplay was launched in 2003, ranking songs based on airplay detections on dance radio, as well as mix-show plays on top 40 radio and select rhythmic radio as measured by Mediabase. Premiered on January 26, 2013, the Hot Dance/Electronic Songs is a multi-metric chart ranking songs based on streaming, sales, and airplay audience impressions from radio stations of all formats.

== Chart history ==
Key
†	Indicates top-performing dance song of 2016.

Chart history
Issue date	Hot Dance/Electronic Songs			Dance Club Songs			Dance/Mix Show Airplay		
Issue date	Song	Artist(s)	Ref.	Song	Artist(s)	Ref.	Song	Artist(s)	Ref.
January 2	"Lean On"	Major Lazer & DJ Snake featuring MØ		"Run on Love"	Lucas Nord featuring Tove Lo		"Sorry"	Justin Bieber	
January 9	"Roses"	The Chainsmokers featuring ROZES		"Sorry"	Justin Bieber		"Sorry"	Justin Bieber	
January 16	"Roses"	The Chainsmokers featuring ROZES		"Higher Place"	Dimitri Vegas & Like Mike featuring Ne-Yo		"Sorry"	Justin Bieber	
January 23	"Roses"	The Chainsmokers featuring ROZES		"Til It Happens to You"	Lady Gaga		"Roses"	The Chainsmokers featuring ROZES	
January 30	"Roses"	The Chainsmokers featuring ROZES		"Shout It Out Loud"	Robin S. and DJ Escape		"Roses"	The Chainsmokers featuring ROZES	
February 6	"Roses"	The Chainsmokers featuring ROZES		"Magnets"	Disclosure featuring Lorde		"Roses"	The Chainsmokers featuring ROZES	
February 13	"Roses"	The Chainsmokers featuring ROZES		"California Dreamin'"	Freischwimmer		"Roses"	The Chainsmokers featuring ROZES	
February 20	"Roses"	The Chainsmokers featuring ROZES		"Stolen Car"	Mylène Farmer and Sting		"Roses"	The Chainsmokers featuring ROZES	
February 27	"Roses"	The Chainsmokers featuring ROZES		"Over and Over Again"	Nathan Sykes featuring Ariana Grande		"Roses"	The Chainsmokers featuring ROZES	
March 5	"Roses"	The Chainsmokers featuring ROZES		"The Girl Is Mine"	99 Souls featuring Destiny's Child and Brandy		"Roses"	The Chainsmokers featuring ROZES	
March 12	"Roses"	The Chainsmokers featuring ROZES		"True Original"	Dave Audé featuring Andy Bell		"Roses"	The Chainsmokers featuring ROZES	
March 19	"Roses"	The Chainsmokers featuring ROZES		"Adventure of a Lifetime"	Coldplay		"Roses"	The Chainsmokers featuring ROZES	
March 26	"Roses"	The Chainsmokers featuring ROZES		"When We Were Young"	Adele		"Roses"	The Chainsmokers featuring ROZES	
April 2	"Roses"	The Chainsmokers featuring ROZES		"Sound of Your Heart"	Shawn Hook		"Light It Up"	Major Lazer featuring Nyla and Fuse ODG	
April 9	"Roses"	The Chainsmokers featuring ROZES		"Fast Car"	Jonas Blue featuring Dakota		"Light It Up"	Major Lazer featuring Nyla and Fuse ODG	
April 16	"Never Forget You"	Zara Larsson and MNEK		"Youth"	Troye Sivan		"I Took a Pill in Ibiza"	Mike Posner	
April 23	"Never Forget You"	Zara Larsson and MNEK		"Work"	Rihanna featuring Drake		"I Took a Pill in Ibiza"	Mike Posner	
April 30	"Never Forget You"	Zara Larsson and MNEK		"The Pop Kids"	Pet Shop Boys		"Don't Let Me Down"	The Chainsmokers featuring Daya	
May 7	"Don't Let Me Down" ‡	The Chainsmokers featuring Daya		"If You Like It"	StoneBridge featuring Elsa Li Jones		"Don't Let Me Down"	The Chainsmokers featuring Daya	
May 14	"Don't Let Me Down" ‡	The Chainsmokers featuring Daya		"Walking on a Dream"	Empire of the Sun		"Don't Let Me Down"	The Chainsmokers featuring Daya	
May 21	"Don't Let Me Down" ‡	The Chainsmokers featuring Daya		"One Night"	WTS featuring Gia		"I Took a Pill in Ibiza"	Mike Posner	
May 28	"Don't Let Me Down" ‡	The Chainsmokers featuring Daya		"Smile"	Sheila Gordhan		"Don't Let Me Down"	The Chainsmokers featuring Daya	
June 4	"Don't Let Me Down" ‡	The Chainsmokers featuring Daya		"So Happy"	Tony Moran featuring Jason Walker		"Don't Let Me Down"	The Chainsmokers featuring Daya	
June 11	"Don't Let Me Down" ‡	The Chainsmokers featuring Daya		"Coming Over"	Dillon Francis and Kygo featuring James Hersey		"Don't Let Me Down"	The Chainsmokers featuring Daya	
June 18	"Don't Let Me Down" ‡	The Chainsmokers featuring Daya		"Under These Lights"	Xenia Ghali		"This Is What You Came For"†	Calvin Harris featuring Rihanna	
June 25	"Don't Let Me Down" ‡	The Chainsmokers featuring Daya		"Cheap Thrills"	Sia featuring Sean Paul		"This Is What You Came For"†	Calvin Harris featuring Rihanna	
July 2	"Don't Let Me Down" ‡	The Chainsmokers featuring Daya		"Kill the Lights"	Alex Newell, Jess Glynne and DJ Cassidy with Nile Rodgers		"This Is What You Came For"†	Calvin Harris featuring Rihanna	
July 9	"Don't Let Me Down" ‡	The Chainsmokers featuring Daya		"This Is What You Came For"†	Calvin Harris featuring Rihanna		"This Is What You Came For"†	Calvin Harris featuring Rihanna	
July 16	"Don't Let Me Down" ‡	The Chainsmokers featuring Daya		"This Is What You Came For"†	Calvin Harris featuring Rihanna		"This Is What You Came For"†	Calvin Harris featuring Rihanna	
July 23	"Don't Let Me Down" ‡	The Chainsmokers featuring Daya		"Can't Stop the Feeling!"	Justin Timberlake		"This Is What You Came For"†	Calvin Harris featuring Rihanna	
July 30	"This Is What You Came For"	Calvin Harris featuring Rihanna		"Livin' for Your Love (Your Love)"	Rosabel featuring Jeanie Tracy		"This Is What You Came For"†	Calvin Harris featuring Rihanna	
August 6	"This Is What You Came For"	Calvin Harris featuring Rihanna		"Kiss It Better"	Rihanna		"This Is What You Came For"†	Calvin Harris featuring Rihanna	
August 13	"Cold Water"	Major Lazer featuring Justin Bieber and MØ		"How Many Fucks"	Erika Jayne		"This Is What You Came For"†	Calvin Harris featuring Rihanna	
August 20	"This Is What You Came For"	Calvin Harris featuring Rihanna		"Needed Me"	Rihanna		"This Is What You Came For"†	Calvin Harris featuring Rihanna	
August 27	"Cold Water"	Major Lazer featuring Justin Bieber and MØ		"Sunrise"	Joe Bermudez featuring Louise Carver		"This Is What You Came For"†	Calvin Harris featuring Rihanna	
September 3	"Closer"	The Chainsmokers featuring Halsey		"Like I Would"	Zayn		"This Is What You Came For"†	Calvin Harris featuring Rihanna	
September 10	"Closer"	The Chainsmokers featuring Halsey		"Sweet Dreams"	JX Riders featuring Skylar Stecker		"Closer"	The Chainsmokers featuring Halsey	
September 17	"Closer"	The Chainsmokers featuring Halsey		"Duele el Corazón"	Enrique Iglesias featuring Wisin		"Closer"	The Chainsmokers featuring Halsey	
September 24	"Closer"	The Chainsmokers featuring Halsey		"Cold Water"	Major Lazer featuring Justin Bieber and MØ		"Closer"	The Chainsmokers featuring Halsey	
October 1	"Closer"	The Chainsmokers featuring Halsey		"Boss"	Disclosure		"Closer"	The Chainsmokers featuring Halsey	
October 8	"Closer"	The Chainsmokers featuring Halsey		"Make Me..."	Britney Spears featuring G-Eazy		"Closer"	The Chainsmokers featuring Halsey	
October 15	"Closer"	The Chainsmokers featuring Halsey		"In Common"	Alicia Keys		"Closer"	The Chainsmokers featuring Halsey	
October 22	"Closer"	The Chainsmokers featuring Halsey		"Rise"	Katy Perry		"Closer"	The Chainsmokers featuring Halsey	
October 29	"Closer"	The Chainsmokers featuring Halsey		"Put 'Em High (2016)"	StoneBridge featuring Therese		"Closer"	The Chainsmokers featuring Halsey	
November 5	"Closer"	The Chainsmokers featuring Halsey		"I Love You Always Forever"	Betty Who		"Closer"	The Chainsmokers featuring Halsey	
November 12	"Closer"	The Chainsmokers featuring Halsey		"Telepathy"	Christina Aguilera featuring Nile Rodgers		"Closer"	The Chainsmokers featuring Halsey	
November 19	"Closer"	The Chainsmokers featuring Halsey		"Perfect Strangers"	Jonas Blue featuring JP Cooper		"Closer"	The Chainsmokers featuring Halsey	
November 26	"Closer"	The Chainsmokers featuring Halsey		"Believe"	Crystal Waters featuring Sted-E and Hybrid Heights		"Closer"	The Chainsmokers featuring Halsey	
December 3	"Closer"	The Chainsmokers featuring Halsey		"People Grinnin'"	Nervo featuring The Child of Lov		"Closer"	The Chainsmokers featuring Halsey	
December 10	"Closer"	The Chainsmokers featuring Halsey		"In the Name of Love"	Martin Garrix and Bebe Rexha		"Closer"	The Chainsmokers featuring Halsey	
December 17	"Closer"	The Chainsmokers featuring Halsey		"Say Yes"	Tony Moran featuring Jason Walker		"Closer"	The Chainsmokers featuring Halsey	
December 24	"Closer"	The Chainsmokers featuring Halsey		"Icarus"	R3hab		"Closer"	The Chainsmokers featuring Halsey	
December 31	"Closer"	The Chainsmokers featuring Halsey		"Button Pusha"	Ralphi Rosario featuring Aneeta Beat		"Closer"	The Chainsmokers featuring Halsey	
