= Cofield Mundi =

South African singer and songwriter

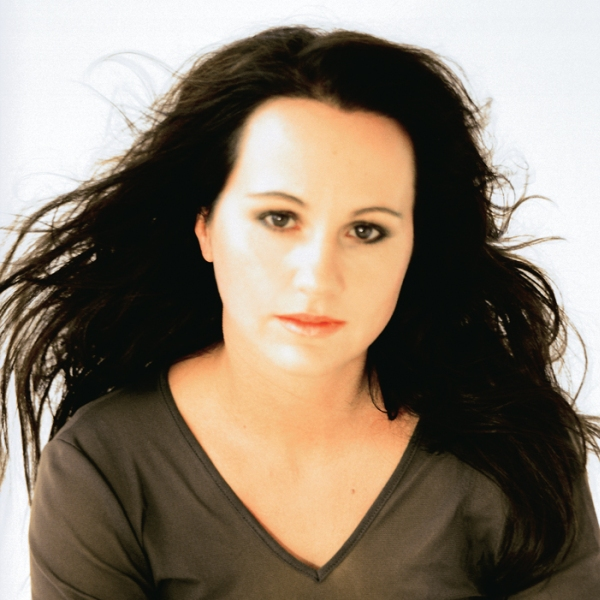

Background information
- Born: Johannesburg, South Africa
- Genres: Pop, rock
- Occupation: Singer-songwriter
- Instruments: Vocals, guitar, piano
- Years active: 2003-present
- Labels: Fresh Music, Universal Music Group, Sony BMG
- Website: cofieldmundi.com

Cofield Mundi is a South African singer and songwriter born in Johannesburg, South Africa. Raised in a musical family, she began singing and performing from a young age and wrote her first song at the age of 12. Her aunt is South African born actress and singer Jill Kirkland, famous for her role in the movie Katrina.

Cofield's has released two albums, Ceremony and The Big Question through Universal Music Group, South Africa. Mundi's debut album, 'Ceremony' was received well by both critics and audiences, with it being described as 'intoxicating' and 'a debut album that most artists spend a lifetime trying to achieve.' and highly regarded by listeners, listing it as 'a deep soulful compilation of songs' and praise for her lyricism. The album's contents included a range of emotion laden ballads and danceable record, which stands out for the 2000s decade, sonically. Both albums were nominated for South African Music Awards. Cofield began her musical career as lead singer for South African cult underground band, The Aeroplanes.

In 2005, Cofield became an ambassador for the Nelson Mandela 46664 foundation and performed at the concert in George alongside Will Smith, Annie Lennox and Queen with Paul Rodgers.

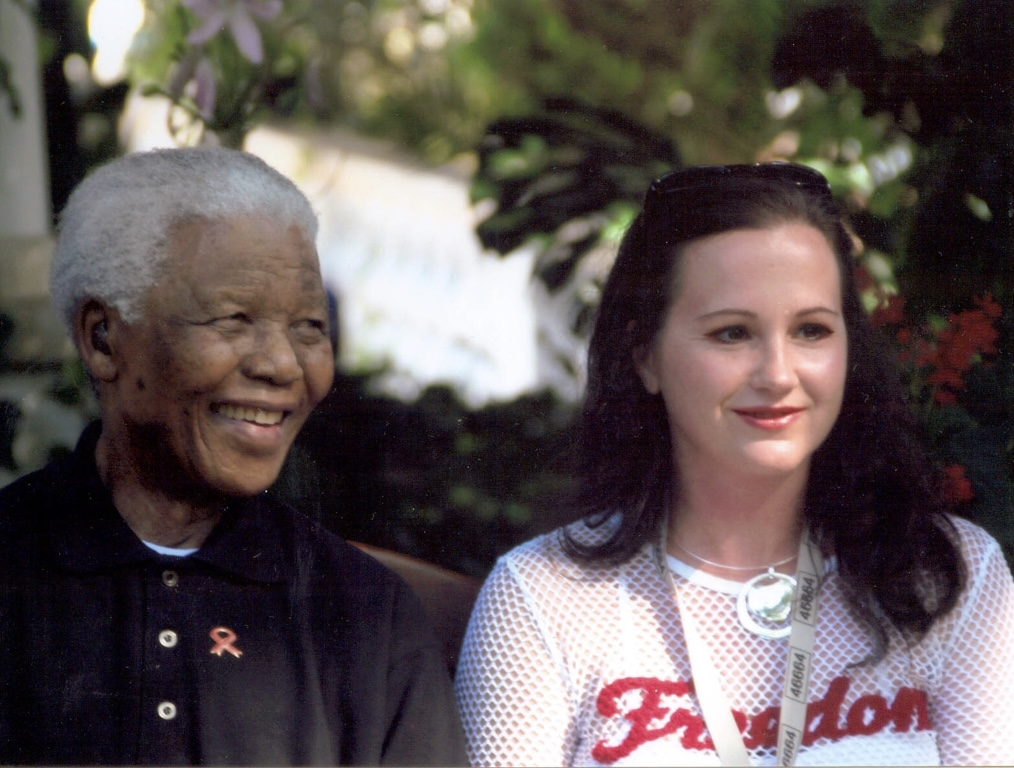
Ambassador for the Nelson Mandela 46664 foundation

== Career ==
Cofield has co-written with notable artists and writers, like Russell Dickerson, whose single Yours debuted at No. 1 on Billboard's Heat Seeker chart, Cary Barlowe, Adam Zelkind, Jeff Cohen, Matthew Puckett and Wayne Carson, who wrote the all-time classic “Always on my Mind” recorded and performed by numerous stars including Elvis Presley, Wille Nelson, Dolly Parton, Johnny Cash and Pet Shop Boys. Cofield has recorded in some of the most renowned studios worldwide, including Abbey Road Studios in London.

Cofield gained recognition after the release of her first album, Ceremony (Fresh Music) in 2003 which was nominated for Best Pop Album at the South African Music Awards SAMA'S 2004. Her second album, The Big Question (Universal Music Group) was nominated for Best Adult Contemporary album at the South African Music Awards SAMA's 2009.

In 2008, Cofield released her second album, The Big Question, through Sony BMG but later moved across to Universal where she re-released the album in 2009.

In 2011, Cofield appeared as a guest judge and performed on South African Idols Season v11.

In 2010, Idols (South Africa season 6) winner, Elvis Blue, covered the single Only wanna be with you on his album Lightly Tread, which Cofield co-wrote with Alissa Moreno. Lightly tread won Best Adult Contemporary Album at the 2012 South African Music Awards. One of the singles that Cofield co-wrote with Russell Dickerson called Make Time Stand Still, was covered by Idols South Africa (Season 7) runner up, Mark Haze, on his debut album, Where Angels Fear to Fly.

== Discography ==
=== Albums ===
- - Ceremony On Apple Music 2004
- - The Big Question on Apple Music2009

=== Compilations ===
- Palace Lounge presents Cafe D'Afrique
- Count me out (2006)
- Lightly Tread Elvis Blue
- Only want to be with you2010 Elvis Blue
- Where Angels fear to Fly(2012)
- Make time stand still Mark Haze
- Get Fresh! Various Artists
