= Shout It Out Loud =

"Shout It Out Loud" may refer to:

- "Shout It Out Loud" (Kiss song)
- "Shout It Out Loud" (Robin S & DJ Escape song)

== See also ==
- Shout It Out (disambiguation)
- Shout (disambiguation)
