= Shout It Out =

Shout It Out may refer to:

== Albums ==
- Shout It Out (Elli Erl album)
- Shout It Out (Hanson album)
- Shout It Out (Patrice Rushen album)

== Songs ==
- "Shout It Out" (Alisa Mizuki song)
- "Shout It Out" (BoA song)
- "Shout It Out" (Kingpin song)
- "Shout It Out" (Mariette song)
- "Shout It Out" (Reece Mastin song)
- "Shout It Out" (Shotgun Messiah song)
- "Shout It Out", a 2010 song by Marc Mysterio
- "Shout It Out", the theme song from The Wendy Williams Show
- "Shout It Out", a 1984 song by Prodigal from Electric Eye

== See also ==
- Shout It Out Loud (disambiguation)
- Shout (disambiguation)
