= If You Like It =

Single by StoneBridge featuring Elsa Li Jones
- Released: 15 February 2016
- Genre: Deep house Eurodance
- Length: 4:44 (original mix); 2:59 (radio edit)
- Label: StoneBridge Productions
- Songwriters: Sten Hallström; Elsa Li Jones
- Producer: Sten Hallström

StoneBridge singles chronology
"Out of Nowhere" (2015)	"If You Like It" (2016)	"Put 'Em High 2K16" (2016)

Elsa Li Jones singles chronology
"If You Like It" (2016)

"If You Like It" is a song by Swedish DJ, producer, and remixer StoneBridge featuring fellow Swedish vocalist Elsa Li Jones. The single is the first number one for both artists in the United States, where it topped the Billboard Dance Club Songs in its 7 May 2016 issue.

== Track listing ==
Digital download (United States)
Digital download (United States)
Digital download (United States)

1. If You Like It (feat. Elsa Li Jones) [StoneBridge Radio] 2:59
2. If You Like It (feat. Elsa Li Jones) [StoneBridge Club Mix] 4:44
3. If You Like It (feat. Elsa Li Jones) [StoneBridge Speed Queen Mix] 4:12
4. If You Like It (feat. Elsa Li Jones) [StoneBridge Dub] 4:30
5. If You Like It (feat. Elsa Li Jones) [Bojan Remix] 4:24
6. If You Like It (feat. Elsa Li Jones) [Evil Twin Remix] 4:35
7. If You Like It (feat. Elsa Li Jones) [Hybrid Heights Remix] 5:10
8. If You Like It (feat. Elsa Li Jones) [Serbsican Remix] 6:45

== See also ==
- List of number-one dance singles of 2016 (U.S.)
