= Idols South Africa season 6 =

Idols South Africa
- Season 6
- Hosted by: Liezel van der Westhuizen; ProVerb
- Judges: Mara Louw; Gareth Cliff; Randall Abrahams
- Winner: Elvis Blue
- Runner-up: Lloyd Cele

Release
- Original network: M-Net
- Original release: 18 July – 2 November 2010

Season chronology
- ← Previous; Season 5 Next → Season 7

Idols South Africa VI is the sixth season of South African reality interactive talent show based on the British talent show Pop Idol. It premiered on 18 July 2010. For the first time Dave Thompson was not a member of the judging panel. The remaining three judges all returned and were supported by a guest judge in every casting city: Zolani (member of FreshlyGround) in Cape Town, Kahn Morebee (The Parlotones) in Johannesburg, Steve Hofmeyr in Durban, HHP in Port Elizabeth, and Loyiso in Bloemfontein.

The fourteen semifinalists where split in two groups of seven and performed live at Mosaïek Teatro on 22 and 27 August 2010 respectively. After the bottom two from each vote were eliminated, the remaining finalists were merged for the round of the top ten.

Top ten contestant Jamie-Lee Sexton had already been a finalist on Idols III under the name Jamie-Lee Blokdyk where she placed twelfth. She is therefore the first Idol contestant worldwide that made the finals on two different seasons. Accordingly, this was the second season (after season five) in which the top two contestants were never in the bottom, and (after the first season) the second in which both finalists were male.

== Top 14 ==
=== Group 1 ===
Guest Judge: Ross Learmonth

Order	Contestant	Song (Original Artist)	Result
1	Peter Grobler	"Love Is Gone" (David Guetta)	Eliminated
2	S'posh Petshwa	"Doesn't Mean Anything" (Alicia Keys)	Eliminated
3	Sindi Nene	"Hurt" (Christina Aguilera)	Bottom 3
4	Jess Yallup	"I Still Haven't Found What I'm Looking For" (U2)	Safe
5	Pieter West	"Never Gonna Be Alone" (Nickelback)	Safe
6	Boki Ntsime	"Drift Away" (John Henry Kurtz)	Safe
7	Bongi Mthombeni	"The Reason" (Hoobastank)	Safe

=== Group 2 ===
Guest Judge: Judith Sephuma

Order	Contestant	Song (Original Artist)	Result
1	Jamie-Lee Sexton	"Mercy" (Duffy)	Bottom 3
2	Zintle Mkwela	"Chasing Pavements" (Adele)	Eliminated
3	Elvis Blue	"Heaven" (Bryan Adams)	Safe
4	Gail Nkoane	"If I Ain't Got You" (Alicia Keys)	Safe
5	Lloyd Cele	"The Time of My Life" (David Cook)	Safe
6	Adeline Mocke	"When Love Takes Over" (Kelly Rowland & David Guetta)	Safe
7	Funeka Peppeta	"A Moment Like This" (Kelly Clarkson)	Eliminated

== Finals ==
=== Finalists ===
(ages stated at time of contest)

Contestant	Age	Hometown	Voted Off	Spectacular Theme
Elvis Blue	30	George	Winner	Finals
Lloyd Cele	28	Durban	2 Nov 2010	Finals
Sindi Nene	22	Durban	26 Oct 2010	Semi-Final
Boki Ntsime	21	Johannesburg	19 Oct 2010	Unplugged
Adeline Mocke	22	Cape Town	12 Oct 2010	Show Stopper
Pieter West	25	Free State	12 Oct 2010	Show Stopper
Jess Yallup	22	Durban	28 Sep 2010	Michael Jackson
Jamie-Lee Sexton	22	Johannesburg	21 Sep 2010	Home Brew
Bongi Mthombeni	23	Johannesburg	14 Sep 2010	Disco
Gail Nkoane	25	Kimberley	7 Sep 2010	Pop / Rock

=== Top 10 – Rock / Pop ===
Guest Judge: Kahn Morbee

Order	Contestant	Song (Original Artist)	Result
1	Elvis Blue	"Play That Funky Music" (Wild Cherry)	Safe
2	Gail Nkoane	"Please Don't Leave Me" (P!nk)	Eliminated
3	Pieter West	"Won't Go Home Without You" (Maroon 5)	Safe
4	Adeline Mocke	"Purple Rain" (Prince)	Safe
5	Jamie-Lee Sexton	"Light My Fire" (The Doors)	Bottom 3
6	Boki Ntsime	"Use Somebody" (Kings of Leon)	Safe
7	Sindi Nene	"I Kissed A Girl" (Katy Perry)	Safe
8	Bongi Mthombeni	"It's My Life" (Bon Jovi)	Safe
9	Lloyd Cele	"Beautiful Day" (U2)	Safe
10	Jess Yallup	"Zombie" (The Cranberries)	Bottom 3

=== Top 9 – Disco ===
Guest Judge: Tamara Dey

Order	Contestant	Song (Original Artist)	Result
1	Bongi Mthombeni	"Celebration" (Kool & the Gang)	Eliminated
2	Lloyd Cele	"Twist and Shout" (Top Notes)	Safe
3	Pieter West	"Knock On Wood" (Eddie Floyd)	Bottom 3
4	Sindi Nene	"Sweet Dreams" (Beyoncé)	Safe
5	Elvis Blue	"If I Can't Have You" (Yvonne Elliman)	Safe
6	Adeline Mocke	"Hush Hush; Hush Hush" (Pussycat Dolls)	Safe
7	Jess Yallup	"I Don't Feel Like Dancin'" (Scissor Sisters)	Safe
8	Boki Ntsime	"Love Stoned" (Justin Timberlake)	Safe
9	Jamie-Lee Sexton	"Murder on the Dancefloor" (Sophie Ellis-Bextor)	Bottom 3

=== Top 8 – Home Brew ===
Guest Judge: Tumi Masemola

Order	Contestant	Song (Original Artist)	Result
1	Pieter West	"Today" (Jesse Clegg)	Bottom 2
2	Jamie-Lee Sexton	"Save Me" (Clout)	Eliminated
3	Elvis Blue	"Destiny" (Malaika)	Safe
4	Adeline Mocke	"Who Painted The Moon" (Nianell)	Safe
5	Boki Ntsime	"Fairytale" (Liquideep)	Safe
6	Jess Yallup	"What He Means" (Just Jinger)	Safe
7	Sindi Nene	"Moments Away" (Mango Groove)	Safe
8	Lloyd Cele	"Push Me To The Floor" (The Parlotones)	Safe

=== Top 7 – Tribute To Michael Jackson ===
Guest Judge: Loyiso Bala

Order	Contestant	Song (Original Artist)	Result
1	Adeline Mocke	"Black or White" (Michael Jackson)	Bottom 3
2	Jess Yallup	"Earth Song" (Michael Jackson)	Eliminated
3	Lloyd Cele	"Billie Jean" (Michael Jackson)	Safe
4	Pieter West	"Give In to Me" (Michael Jackson)	Bottom 3
5	Elvis Blue	"Remember the Time" (Michael Jackson)	Safe
6	Boki Ntsime	"They Don't Care About Us" (Michael Jackson)	Safe
7	Sindi Nene	"Smooth Criminal" (Michael Jackson)	Safe

=== Top 6.1 - DJ's Choice ===
Guest Judge: Bongani Nchanga

Order	Contestant	Song (Original Artist)	Result
1	Sindi Nene	"I Learned from the Best" (Whitney Houston)	Saved
1	Sindi Nene	"I Drove All Night" (Cyndi Lauper)	Saved
2	Elvis Blue	"Hallelujah" (Leonard Cohen)	Safe
2	Elvis Blue	"Hey Soul Sister" (Train)	Safe
3	Lloyd Cele	"Haven't Met You Yet" (Michael Bublé)	Safe
3	Lloyd Cele	"You Are So Beautiful" (Joe Cocker)	Safe
4	Adeline Mocke	"Stereo Love" (Edward Maya & Vika Jigulina)	Bottom 2
4	Adeline Mocke	"Need You Now" (Lady Antebellum)	Bottom 2
5	Boki Ntsime	"The World's Greatest" (R. Kelly)	Safe
5	Boki Ntsime	"Rosanna" (Toto)	Safe
6	Pieter West	"Rockstar" (Nickelback)	Safe
6	Pieter West	"You Shook Me All Night Long" (AC/DC)	Safe

=== Top 6.2 - Showstoppers ===
Guest Judge: Kurt Darren

Order	Contestant	Song (Original Artist)	Result
1	Lloyd Cele	"Fireflies" (Owl City)	Safe
1	Lloyd Cele	"OMG" (Usher)	Safe
2	Sindi Nene	"One Night Only" (Jennifer Hudson, Beyoncé, Anika Noni Rose & Sharon Leal)	Safe
2	Sindi Nene	"Single Ladies (Put a Ring on It)" (Beyoncé)	Safe
3	Pieter West	"Dancing in the Dark" (Bruce Springsteen)	Eliminated
3	Pieter West	"You Can Leave Your Hat On" (Joe Cocker)	Eliminated
4	Elvis Blue	"Bridge over Troubled Water" (Simon & Garfunkel)	Safe
4	Elvis Blue	"Gold Digger" (Kanye West & Jamie Foxx)	Safe
5	Adeline Mocke	"Dance with My Father" (Luther Vandross)	Eliminated
5	Adeline Mocke	"Give It Up to Me" (Shakira & Lil Wayne)	Eliminated
6	Boki Ntsime	"When a Man Loves a Woman" (Percy Sledge)	Safe
6	Boki Ntsime	"My Love" (Justin Timberlake)	Safe

=== Top 4 - Unplugged ===
Guest Judge: Louise Carver

Order	Contestant	Song (Original Artist)	Result
1	Elvis Blue	"What a Wonderful World" (Louis Armstrong)	Safe
1	Elvis Blue	"Piano Man" (Billy Joel)	Safe
2	Boki Ntsime	"Weeping" (Bright Blue)	Eliminated
2	Boki Ntsime	"A Change Is Gonna Come" (Sam Cooke)	Eliminated
3	Sindi Nene	"A Little Less Conversation" (Elvis Presley)	Bottom 2
3	Sindi Nene	"Beautiful" (Christina Aguilera)	Bottom 2
4	Lloyd Cele	"Linkin Park Medley" (Linkin Park)	Safe
4	Lloyd Cele	"I'm Yours" (Jason Mraz)	Safe

=== Top 3 - Choices ===
Guest Judge: Hip Hop Pantsula

Order	Contestant	Song (Original Artist)	Result
1	Sindi Nene	"Vuli Ndlela" (Brenda Fassie)	Eliminated
1	Sindi Nene	"Spotlight" (Jennifer Hudson)	Eliminated
1	Sindi Nene	"You Raise Me Up" (Secret Garden)	Eliminated
2	Lloyd Cele	"Dynamite" (Taio Cruz)	Safe
2	Lloyd Cele	"Just the Way You Are" (Bruno Mars)	Safe
2	Lloyd Cele	"When You're Gone" (Avril Lavigne)	Safe
3	Elvis Blue	"Broken Strings" (James Morrison)	Safe
3	Elvis Blue	"You Belong to Me" (Bob Dylan)	Safe
3	Elvis Blue	"What About Now" (Daughtry)	Safe

=== Top 2 - Finale ===
Order	Contestant	Song (Original Artist)	Result
1	Lloyd Cele	"Push Me To The Floor" (The Parlotones)	Runner-up
1	Lloyd Cele	"Just the Way You Are" (Bruno Mars)	Runner-up
1	Lloyd Cele	"Thanks to You" (Lloyd Cele)	Runner-up
2	Elvis Blue	"Make You Feel My Love" (Bob Dylan)	Winner
2	Elvis Blue	"Hallelujah" (Leonard Cohen)	Winner
2	Elvis Blue	"Things My Father Said" (Black Stone Cherry)	Winner

== Elimination Chart ==
Legend
Did Not Perform	Female	Male	Top 14	Top 10	Winner

Safe	Safe First	Safe Last	Eliminated	Judges' Save

Stage:		Semi		Finals								
Week:		8/22	8/29	9/6	9/13	9/20	9/27	10/3	10/10	10/17	10/24	10/31
Place	Contestant	Result										
1	Elvis Blue											Winner
2	Lloyd Cele											Runner-Up
3	Sindi Nene	Btm 3						Saved		Btm 2	Elim	
4	Boki Ntsime									Elim		
5-6	Adeline Mocke						Btm 2	Btm 2	Elim			
5-6	Pieter West				Btm 2		Btm 3		Elim			
7	Jess Yallup			Btm 3		Btm 2	Elim					
8	Jamie-Lee Sexton		Btm 3	Btm 2	Btm 3	Elim						
9	Bongi Mthombeni				Elim							
10	Gail Nkoane			Elim								
Semi	Funeka Peppeta		Elim									
Semi	Zintle Mkwela		Elim									
Semi	Peter Grobler	Elim										
Semi	S'posh Petshwa	Elim										
