= Smile (Sheila Gordhan song) =

Single by Sheila Gordhan
- Released: 15 November 2015
- Genre: Disco house, dance-pop
- Length: 6:49 (original mix); 4:27 (radio edit)
- Label: Rach Entertainment; www.rachent.com
- Songwriters: Roger Sanchez; Sheila Gordhan
- Producer: Roger Sanchez

"Smile" is a dance single produced by Roger Sanchez, and written and recorded by British vocalist Sheila Gordhan. Released in November 2015, the digital downloaded single is the first number-one single for Gordhan in the United States, when it topped the Billboard Dance Club Songs chart in May 2016.

In an interview with Billboard, Gordhan reacted to the success of the single: "I'm over the moon! It's amazing to know that there's a lot of love for this record. It's a special track and I'm grateful to everyone for supporting it. It's definitely made me 'smile'!"

== Track listing ==
Digital download (United States)

- Smile (Roger Sanchez Remix) 6:49
- Smile (AM2PM Remix) 5:24
- Smile (Deep Matter Remix) 5:55
- Smile (House of Virus Remix) 5:06
- Smile (Marc Baigent & Element Z Remix) 4:13
- Smile (Ramsey & Fen Remix) 4:58

== See also ==
- List of number-one dance singles of 2016 (U.S.)
