= Ghosting (song) =

Single by Joe Bermudez featuring Megn

from the album New Ginza at Night
- Released: April 17, 2017
- Recorded: 2017
- Genre: Dance-pop, Electropop
- Length: 4:15 (original); 3:15 (radio edit)
- Label: 617 Music
- Songwriters: Joe Bermudez, Vinny Prezioso
- Producer: Joe Bermudez

Joe Bermudez singles chronology
"Sunrise" (2016)	"Ghosting" (2017)	"Crazy Enough" (2018)

"Ghosting" is a song recorded, written, and produced by American DJ/producer/remixer Joe Bermudez featuring American singer Megn. The track reached number one on Billboard's Dance Club Songs chart in its July 8, 2017 issue, giving Bermudez his second number-one and Megn her first chart-topper.

In an interview with Billboard, Bermudez explained the inspiration behind "Ghosting": "The song is inspired by me being ghosted in real life. I had been seeing this girl and things were going well, but then she disappeared with no explanation, never to be seen or heard from ever again. It didn't make any sense and I was really frustrated. I needed some sort of outlet for my anger so I got together with my friend [and 'Ghosting' co-writer] Vinny Prezioso, who was going through a similar situation, and the next thing you know 'Ghosting' just poured out of us. Hopefully she hears it and realizes she totally f'd up!"

== Track listings ==
Remixes EP (Part 1)

1. "Ghosting" (featuring Megn) [Etto Remix] – 4:22
2. "Ghosting" (featuring Megn) [Sam Halabi Remix] – 4:00
3. "Ghosting" (featuring Megn) [Extended Version] – 4:15
4. "Ghosting" (featuring Megn) [Etto Remix Instrumental] – 4:22
5. "Ghosting" (featuring Megn) [Sam Halabi Remix] – 4:00
6. "Ghosting" (featuring Megn) [Extended Instrumental Version] – 4:15
7. "Ghosting" (featuring Megn) [Etto Remix Radio Edit] – 3:26
8. "Ghosting" (featuring Megn) [Sam Halabi Remix Radio Edit] – 2:58
9. "Ghosting" (featuring Megn) [Radio Edit] – 3:15

Remixes EP (Part 2)

1. "Ghosting" (featuring Megn) [Alex Guesta Remix] – 4:20
2. "Ghosting" (featuring Megn) [Nathan C Remix] – 4:35
3. "Ghosting" (featuring Megn) [Alex Guesta Remix Instrumental] – 4:20
4. "Ghosting" (featuring Megn) [Nathan C Remix Instrumental] – 4:35
5. "Ghosting" (featuring Megn) [Alex Guesta Remix Radio Edit] – 3:01
6. "Ghosting" (featuring Megn) [Nathan C Remix Radio Edit] – 3:16

Remixes EP (Part 3)

1. "Ghosting" (featuring Megn) [Andski Remix] – 5:07
2. "Ghosting" (featuring Megn) [Kaidro Remix] – 4:45
3. "Ghosting" (featuring Megn) [Andski Remix Instrumental] – 5:07
4. "Ghosting" (featuring Megn) [Kaidro Remix Instrumental] – 4:45
5. "Ghosting" (featuring Megn) [Andski Remix Radio Edit] – 3:07
6. "Ghosting" (featuring Megn) [Kaidro Remix Radio Edit] – 3:46

== Charts ==
=== Weekly charts ===
Chart (2017)	Peak position
US Dance Club Songs (Billboard)	1

=== Year-end charts ===
Chart (2017)	Position
US Dance Club Songs (Billboard)	23
