= Crazy Enough (song) =

Single by Joe Bermudez featuring Louise Carver

from the album New Ginza at Night
- Released: January 8, 2018
- Recorded: 2017
- Genre: Dance-pop, Electropop
- Length: 5:00 (original); 3:18 (radio edit)
- Label: 617 Music
- Songwriter(s): Joe Bermudez, Louise Carver
- Producer(s): Joe Bermudez

Joe Bermudez singles chronology
"Ghosting" (2017)	"Crazy Enough" (2018)

"Crazy Enough" is a song recorded, written, and produced by American DJ/producer/remixer Joe Bermudez featuring South African singer Louise Carver. The track reached number one on Billboard's Dance Club Songs chart in its April 14, 2018 issue, giving Bermudez his third and Carver her second chart-topper.

The song is based on Bermudez's life when he grew up as he was harassed and bullied and how he managed to overcome the abuse by standing up to them without resorting to their tactics: "This one holds a special place in my heart. Growing up I wasn't always the 'cool kid' and would often get bullied. Hopefully others going through similar experiences will know that it's okay to be yourself because in the end bullies are not 'crazy enough' to walk a mile in your shoes."

== Track listings ==
Remixes EP

1. "Crazy Enough" [eSQUIRE Remix] – 5:00
2. "Crazy Enough" [Kid Massive Remix] – 5:31
3. "Crazy Enough" [eSQUIRE Remix Instrumental] – 5:00
4. "Crazy Enough" [Kid Massive Remix Instrumental] – 5:31
5. "Crazy Enough" [eSQUIRE Remix Radio Edit] – 3:29
6. "Crazy Enough" [Kid Massive Remix Radio Edit] – 3:18

== Charts ==
=== Weekly charts ===
Chart (2018)	Peak position
US Dance Club Songs (Billboard)	1

=== Year-end charts ===
Chart (2018)	Position
US Dance Club Songs (Billboard)	8
