= One Night (WTS song) =

Single by WTS featuring Gia
- Released: 11 January 2016
- Genre: Eurodance; Dance-pop
- Length: 6:01 (original mix); 4:12 (radio edit)
- Label: WTS Productions; Global Groove Entertainment
- Songwriter(s): Will Mount; Terence Roberts; Sam East; Gia Bella
- Producer(s): Will Mount; Terence Roberts; Sam East

Gia singles chronology
"Bombs Away" (2014)	"One Night" (2016)

"One Night" is a dance single written and recorded by the British production/remix project WTS (an acronym for What's That Sound and the first letters of the project's members, Will Mount, Terence "TiE" Roberts & Sam East) featuring American vocalist Gia Bella. It was released in 2016 as the project's debut single and became the first number-one hit for both artists in the United States, when it topped the Billboard Dance Club Songs chart in May 2016.

== Track listing ==
Digital download (United States)

1. One Night (featuring Gia) (Damien Hall Mix) 3:43
2. One Night (featuring Gia) (AngerWolf Club Mix) 4:33
3. One Night (featuring Gia) (Simone Bresciani Club Mix) 6:11
4. One Night (featuring Gia) (Simone Bresciani Radio Mix) 3:15
5. One Night (featuring Gia) (Tracy Young Club Mix) 6:36
6. One Night (featuring Gia) (Stonebridge Club Instrumental) 6:11
7. One Night (featuring Gia) (StoneBridge Radio Mix) 3:21
8. One Night (featuring Gia) (StoneBridge Radio Instrumental) 3:21
9. One Night (featuring Gia) (StoneBridge Dub Mix) 5:11
10. One Night (featuring Gia) (StoneBridge Club Mix) 6:11
11. One Night (featuring Gia) (The Scene Kings Club Mix) 4:44
12. One Night (featuring Gia) (The Scene Kings Radio Mix) 3:25
13. One Night (featuring Gia) (Mike Rizzo Funk Generation After Hours Radio Mix) 4:07
14. One Night (featuring Gia) (Mike Rizzo Funk Generation After Hours Mix) 5:42
15. One Night (featuring Gia) (Mike Rizzo Funk Generation Club Mix) 6:01
16. One Night (featuring Gia) (Mike Rizzo Funk Generation Radio Mix) 4:12

== See also ==
- List of number-one dance singles of 2016 (U.S.)
