= Sunrise (Joe Bermudez song) =

Single by Joe Bermudez featuring Louise Carver

from the album New Ginza At Night
- Released: April 25, 2016
- Recorded: 2016
- Genre: Dance/house
- Length: 6:06; 3:41 (radio edit)
- Label: 617 Music
- Songwriter(s): Joe Bermudez; Louise Carver
- Producer(s): Joe Bermudez

Joe Bermudez singles chronology
"Fool For You" (2016)	"Sunrise" (2016)	"Ghosting" (2017)

"Sunrise" is a song recorded, written, and produced by American DJ/producer/remixer Joe Bermudez featuring South African singer/songwriter Louise Carver. The uplifting track about starting over after overcoming loss and setbacks reached number one on Billboard's Dance Club Songs chart in its August 27, 2016 issue, giving the two performers their first chart topper.

In an interview with Billboard, Bermudez commented on the song's success: "My first No. 1 record is kind of like my first kiss," adding that "I never thought it was going to happen and when it did it I was overwhelmed with an excitement I've never felt before. So much so, that it's hard to even put into words. It's something that I'll never forget, though." Carver later echoed those comments after she was asked about her first number one in the United States, saying: "When I heard that Joe and I are No. 1 on the Billboard chart [this week], I literally screamed in shock. I am trying to just enjoy the moment and appreciate this really incredible gift!"

== Track listings ==
Beatport listing (part 1)

- Sunrise (Michael Cassette Remix) 6:06
- Sunrise (Mark Lower Remix) 6:50
- Sunrise (Joe Garston Remix) 4:52
- Sunrise (Michael Cassette Remix Instrumental) 6:06
- Sunrise (Mark Lower Remix Instrumental) 4:52
- Sunrise (Joe Garston Remix Instrumental) 6:50
- Sunrise (Michael Cassette Remix Radio Edit) 3:38
- Sunrise (Mark Lower Remix Radio Edit) 3:47
- Sunrise (Joe Garston Remix Radio Edit) 3:16
- Sunrise (Radio Edit) 3:41

Beatport listing (part 2)

- Sunrise (Frank Caro & Alemany Remix) 4:04
- Sunrise (Dapa Deep Remix) 7:31
- Sunrise (Extended Mix) 4:31
- Sunrise (Frank Caro & Alemany Remix Instrumental) 4:04
- Sunrise (Dapa Deep Remix Instrumental) 7:32
- Sunrise (Extended Instrumental) 4:31
- Sunrise (Frank Caro & Alemany Remix Radio Edit) 3:06
- Sunrise (Dapa Deep Remix Radio Edit) 4:04
- Sunrise (Radio Edit) 3:41

Beatport listing (part 3)

- Sunrise (Jay Santos & Bret Law Remix) *5:37
- Sunrise (Alex H Remix) 5:03
- Sunrise (Jay Santos & Bret Law Remix Instrumental) 5:37
- Sunrise (Alex H Remix Instrumental) 5:03
- Sunrise (Jay Santos & Bret Law Remix Radio Edit) 3:31
- Sunrise (Alex H Remix Radio Edit) 3:22
- Sunrise (Piano Version) 3:37
