= Joe Bermudez =

American disc jockey

Joseph R. Bermudez is an American disc jockey and house music artist. Three of his songs - "Sunrise" (2016, with Louise Carver), "Ghosting" (2018, with Megn), and "Crazy Enough" (2018, with Louise Carver) - have reached number one on Billboard's Dance Club Songs chart.

== Career ==
Joe Bermudez was born and raised in Maine. He got his start in the music business at the age of 18 when he walked into WKZS radio in Auburn and pleaded for a job doing anything, because he was about to be evicted from his apartment. After a few months, Bermudez was hosting his own show, "Kiss Klub Night". He later became the music director for the syndicated weekend radio show Open House Party.

By 2002, Bermudez was well enough known as a DJ to be hired by Sirius XM Radio for their BPM electronic dance music channel. By 2004, he was also doing shows on WAKS in Cleveland and WAKZ in Youngstown, Ohio. In 2012, Bermudez was based in Boston and opened for Madonna at the TD Garden (as a last minute substitute for Martin Solveig). Bermudez released the album New Ginza at Night in 2014; he later licensed the track "DJ Fav" for use in the 2016 film High Strung, where it was performed by Nia Sioux. In 2015, he was appearing weekly on Boston's WBGB "103.3 AMP Radio" there and DJing locally and nationwide.

Bermudez has done official remixes for artists such as Celine Dion ("I'm Alive" (2002)), Mis-Teeq ("One Night Stand" and "Scandalous" (both 2004)), Kelly Clarkson ("Behind These Hazel Eyes" (2005), Shania Twain ("Shoes" (2005)), Janice Robinson ("Dreamer" (2006)), Hilary Duff ("Come Clean" (2004), "With Love" (2007), and "Reach Out" (2008)), Britney Spears ("Circus" (2008)), Kesha ("Blah Blah Blah" (2010)), Rihanna ("S&M" (2011)), and Selena Gomez & the Scene ("Who Says" (2011)).
