= Button Pusha =

Single by Ralphi Rosario featuring Aneeta Beat

from the album 2 Sides to the Story
- Released: August 11, 2016
- Recorded: 2016
- Genre: Dance/house
- Length: 4:07 (album cut)
- Label: Carrillo Music
- Songwriters: Ralphi Rosario; Ron G.
- Producers: Ralphi Rosario; Rod Carrillo

Ralphi Rosario singles chronology
"F*ck Your Boyfriend" (2016)	"Button Pusha" (2016)

"Button Pusha" is Electronic/House single that was written, produced, and recorded by American DJ/remixer/musician Ralphi Rosario featuring vocals by singer Aneeta Beat, which was taken from Rosario's debut set 2 Sides to the Story.

== Background ==
The song serves as a tribute to the true underground and veteran club DJs who keep it real—and the criticism to those who they're calling out as fakes, wannabes or sellouts. In an interview with Billboard, Rosario explained the song's meaning, which he claims was meant to be done as a novelty/comedy take on the Dance genre in general: "'Button Pusha' depicts the many new strings of DJs that have picked up the craft, for the sake of quick fame, money, glorification and any kind of stardom. Like myself, many of our veteran DJs have seen the change of our business of being a professional DJ to look like something that seems easy. Many veteran DJs, that are still killing it live in their sets, have the experience of making people come together through their musical journeys; not some hit playlist that's been floating around, thus, making their sets instant. I compare it to, 'just add water and stir.' It may taste like coffee, but it really isn't (laughs)!"

The track became Rosario's second number one single since 2009's "Everybody Shake It" (apart from his side project Rosabel) and the first for Beat on Billboard's Dance Club Songs chart, reaching the summit in its December 31, 2016 issue.

== Track listings ==
Digital download (Remixes)

1. "Button Pusha" (DJ Kue's Radio Mix) – 2:32
2. "Button Pusha" (Ralphi Rosario's Definitive Club Mix) – 5:32
3. "Button Pusha" (DJ Kue Club Mix) – 4:05
4. "Button Pusha" (Ivan Gomez Club Mix) – 7:15
5. "Button Pusha" (Jeff Morgan & Terri B! Club Mix) – 5:50
6. "Button Pusha" (Ralphi Rosario Dub Mix) – 6:40
7. "Button Pusha" (DJ Kue Dub Mix) – 4:05

Digital download (The Hidden Mixes)

1. "Button Pusha" (Rosabel's Tech Mix) – 6:26
2. "Button Pusha" (Rod's Piano & Horns House Mix) – 6:38
