= Elvis Blue =

South African musician

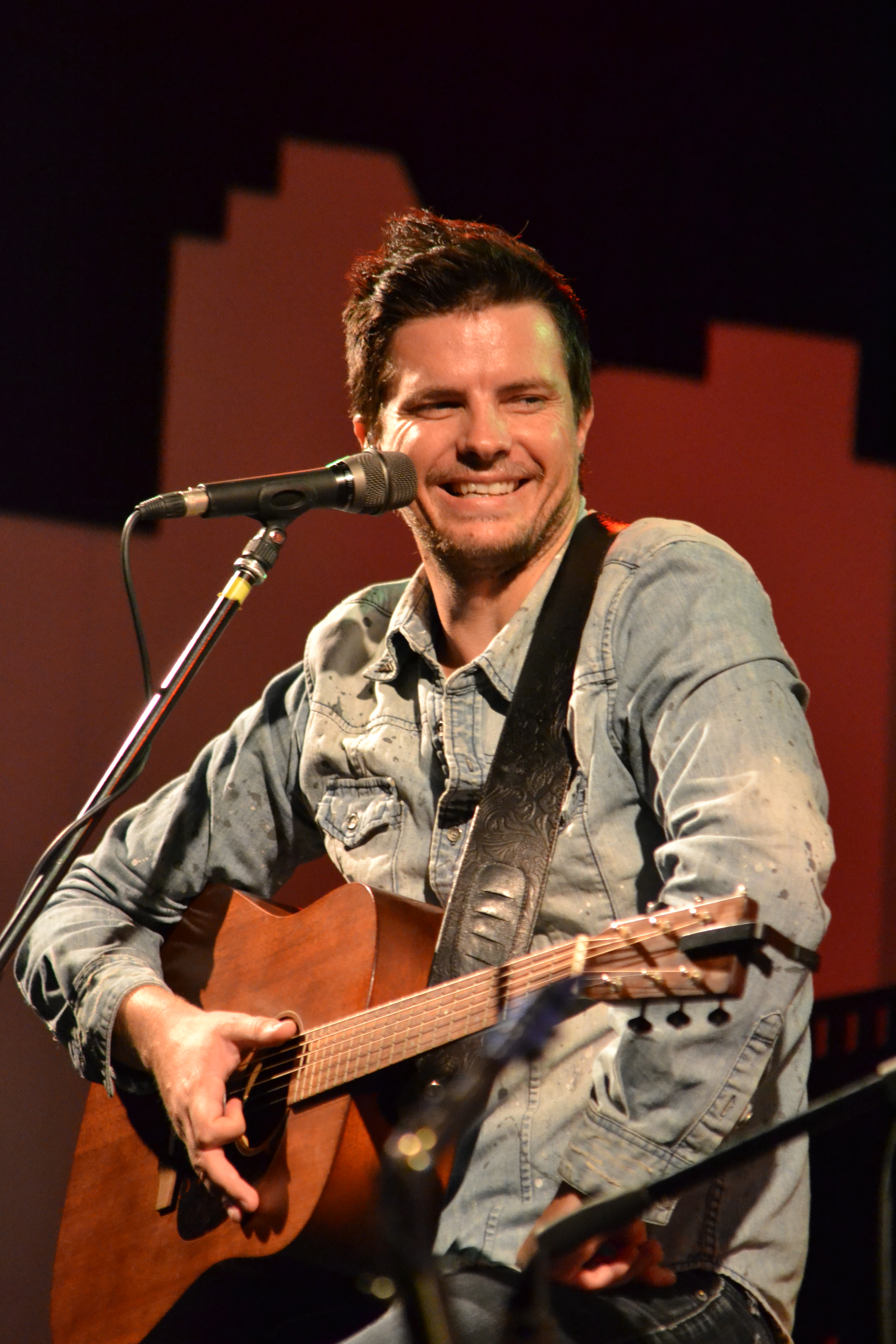
- Elvis Blue in 2014

Background information
- Born: Jan Adriaan Hoogendyk; Johannesburg, South Africa
- Genres: Pop, adult contemporary
- Occupations: Singer, musician, songwriter
- Instruments: Vocals, guitar, keyboard, harmonica, piano
- Years active: 2000–present
- Labels: Universal Music, Coleske Artists
- Website: elvisblue.co.za

Jan Adriaan Hoogendyk, known professionally as Elvis Blue, is a South African musician and songwriter.

== Early life ==
Jan Hoogendyk was born and raised in Johannesburg, South Africa. Hoogendyk is a self-taught musician, teaching himself to play the guitar at the age of 16. During his adolescent years, he started writing his own music and gained experience as a busker on the streets of Johannesburg. During high school, he played in several bands but chose to broaden his experience overseas, busking in London and Scotland.

=== Musical education ===
Hoogendyk's mother, a classical piano teacher, provided him with exposure to classical music throughout his childhood.

When he returned to South Africa, he undertook formal music studies, focusing on piano, guitar, singing and songwriting.

== Career ==
In 2010, Hoogendyk participated in Idols South Africa (season 6). He won the competition with 64% of the votes and shared his prize money with runner-up Lloyd Cele. Elvis is one of the most popular performing artists in South Africa, as well as the only Idols winner to ever had a platinum album. Elvis also holds the record for the most SAMA wins by an Idols winner.

== Albums ==
Hoogendyk recorded five albums before winning Idols South Africa. Under the name Mono, Elvis recorded 3 albums, and then under the name Jan Hoogendyk, another two, one of which - Diep Riviere - won an ATKV Lier Toekening award and another - Ontskemer - received a South African Music Awards nomination.

=== Elvis Blue ===
Elvis Blue was released in November 2010 and received Gold status 29 days after its release, going platinum in 2011, making him the first ever Idols winner to have a platinum album. The album features a duet with Lloyd Cele called 'Little Hero'.

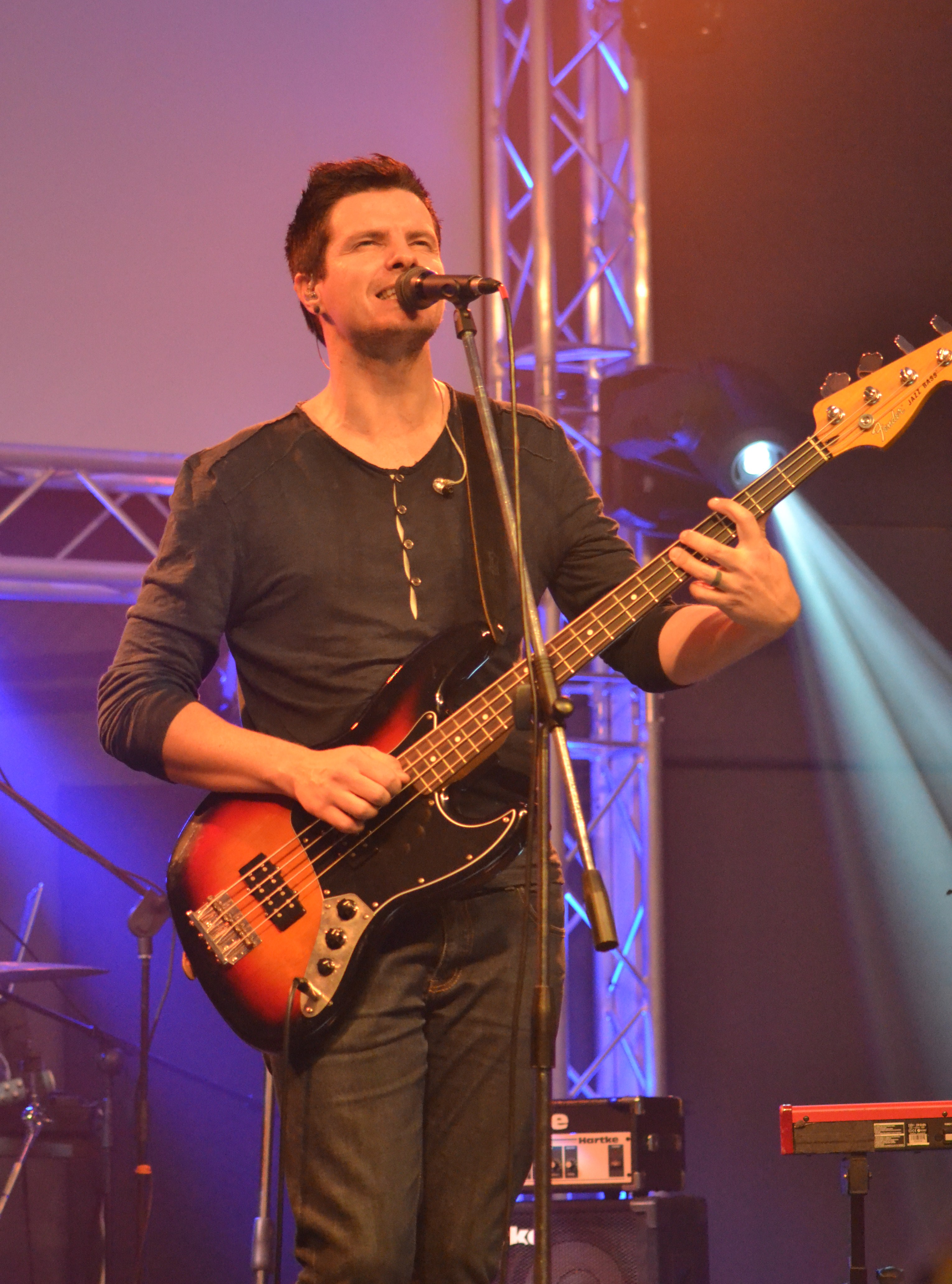
Elvis Blue performing in 2014

Recording began straight after Hoogendyk won Idols South Africa, and was produced by Brian O'Shea, Crighton Goodwill and Jake Odendaal who are all South African Music Awards Producer of the Year Award winners.

The album combines original songs by Hoogendyk with those of other songwriters.

In April 2012, the double-disc special edition release of Elvis Blue won the SAMA for Best Adult Contemporary Album.

=== Journey ===
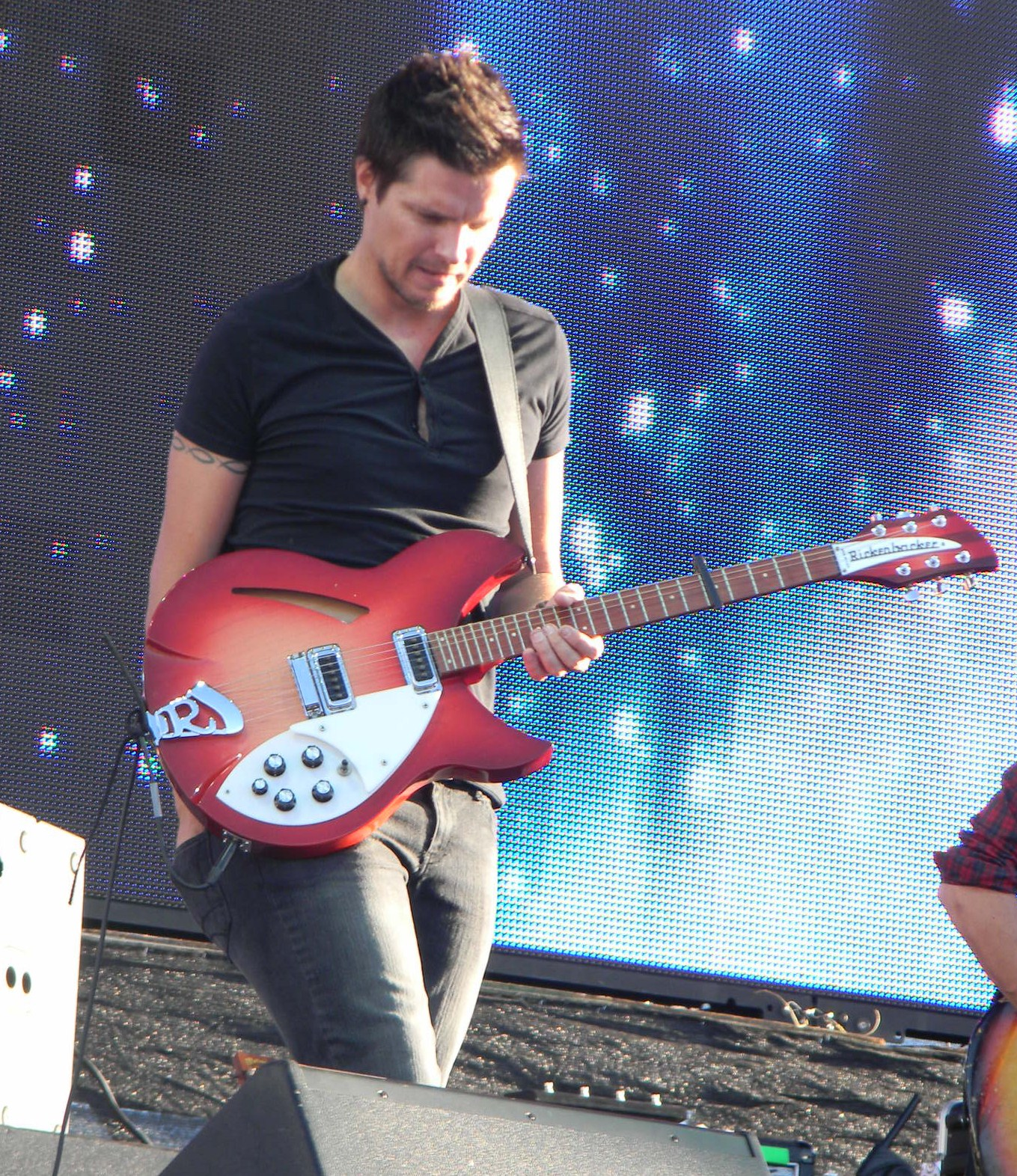
Elvis Blue at K-Day 2012

Hoogendyk travelled to America to co-write new material for Journey with Jeff Franzel, Richard Harris and Pam Sheyne who together composed the hit single, 'Lifeline'.

Journey (Gold status) was nominated for SAMAS for "Song of the Year, "Best Adult Contemporary Album of the Year" and "Best Male Artist of the Year" and walked away with the laurels as "Best Adult Contemporary Album of the Year”.

=== Afrikaans ===
Hoogendyks first album in his mother tongue, aptly named, Afrikaans, debuted on the iTunes store chart at #3, making him the first Afrikaans artist to reach this sought after top 10 Ranking.

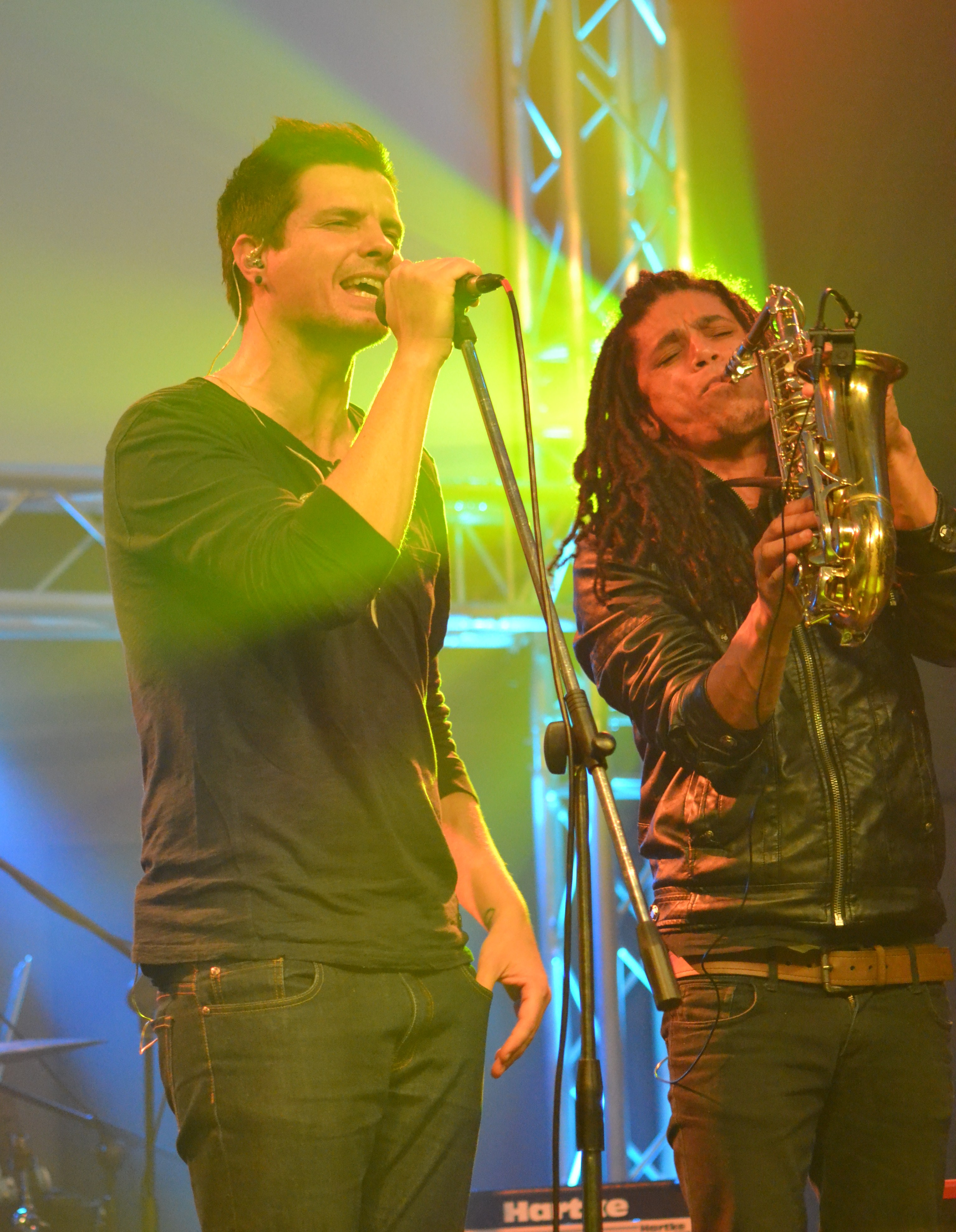
Elvis Blue performing in 2014

2014: Afrikaans attained platinum status a mere 2 months after release.

'Seëngebed' (translated from Afrikaans as 'blessing prayer') is Hoogendyk's Afrikaans rendition of Nkosi Sikelel' iAfrika, South Africa's national anthem, and was performed with Afrikaans singer, Coenie de Villiers.

This album went on to win a SAMA for the "Best Afrikaans Adult Contemporary Album" and the album also received a Huisgenoot Tempo award for "Best Contemporary Album" of 2014.

=== Optics ===
In 2015 Hoogendyk released the album, Optics which was nominated in the SAMA Best Adult Contemporary category. This album also garnered Hoogendyk awards from both Bok Radio and OFM.

=== Êrens In Die Middel van Nêrens ===
2016 the album Erens in die middel van Nêrens (Platinum status) won the SAMA for the "Best Afrikaans Adult Contemporary Album". Erens in die middel van Nêrens was also nominated for 7 Ghoema Music Awards that year and walked away with "Album of the Year", "Male Artist of the Year", "Best Music Video" for Die Hemel, "Best Songwriter", "Best Contemporary Album by a Male Artist”, and “Ringtone of the Year” for Die Hemel, which has been downloaded over 280,000 times. The album also wins a Huisgenoot Tempo Award for "Album of the Year" in 2016 and in the same year, Elvis and Laurika Rauch's DVD, Hart en See, won a Ghoema for best Live DVD as well as a Huisgenoot Tempo award for "Top Selling DVD of the Year".

=== Die Brug ===
n 2017 the album Die Brug was nominated for 7 Ghoemas, in the categories "Best Composition of the Year" for Die Brug, "Best Composition of the Year" for Elke Hart, "Best Composition of the Year" for Werner, "Best Contemporary Album by a Male Artist”, “Best Song Writer”, and “Best Producer in a Group”. Hoogendyk won in the category "Best Composition of the Year" for Die Brug. Die Brug also won a Western Cape Bokkie for "Album of the Year".

=== Stories ===
In 2018, Hoogendyk released the album Stories, for which he received a Ghoema Music Award in 2019 together with Floors Oosthuizen in the category "Best Producers in Collaboration". Stories was also nominated by the Western Cape Bokkies for "Song of the Year" for Hartklop van ‘n Pa as well as "Album of the Year" and "Artist of the Year".

=== Jou Huis ===
In 2019 Hoogendyk releases the album Jou Huis, featuring a title track duet with the late Theuns Jordaan. The album was nominated for a SAMA in the "Best Contemporary Music" category as well as a Western Cape Bokkie for "Male Artist of the Year".

=== Meer as Genoeg ===
This 2022 album was nominated for 4 Aitsa Musiek Toekenning, namely "Listening Song of the Year" - Goud in die Vuur, Songwriter of the Year" – Meer as Genoeg, "Songwriter of the Year" - Goud in die Vuur, "Artist of the Year" and " Song of the Year" – Dis wie ek wil wees, and walks away as winner of "Songwriter of the Year" for Meer as Genoeg

== Community upliftment ==
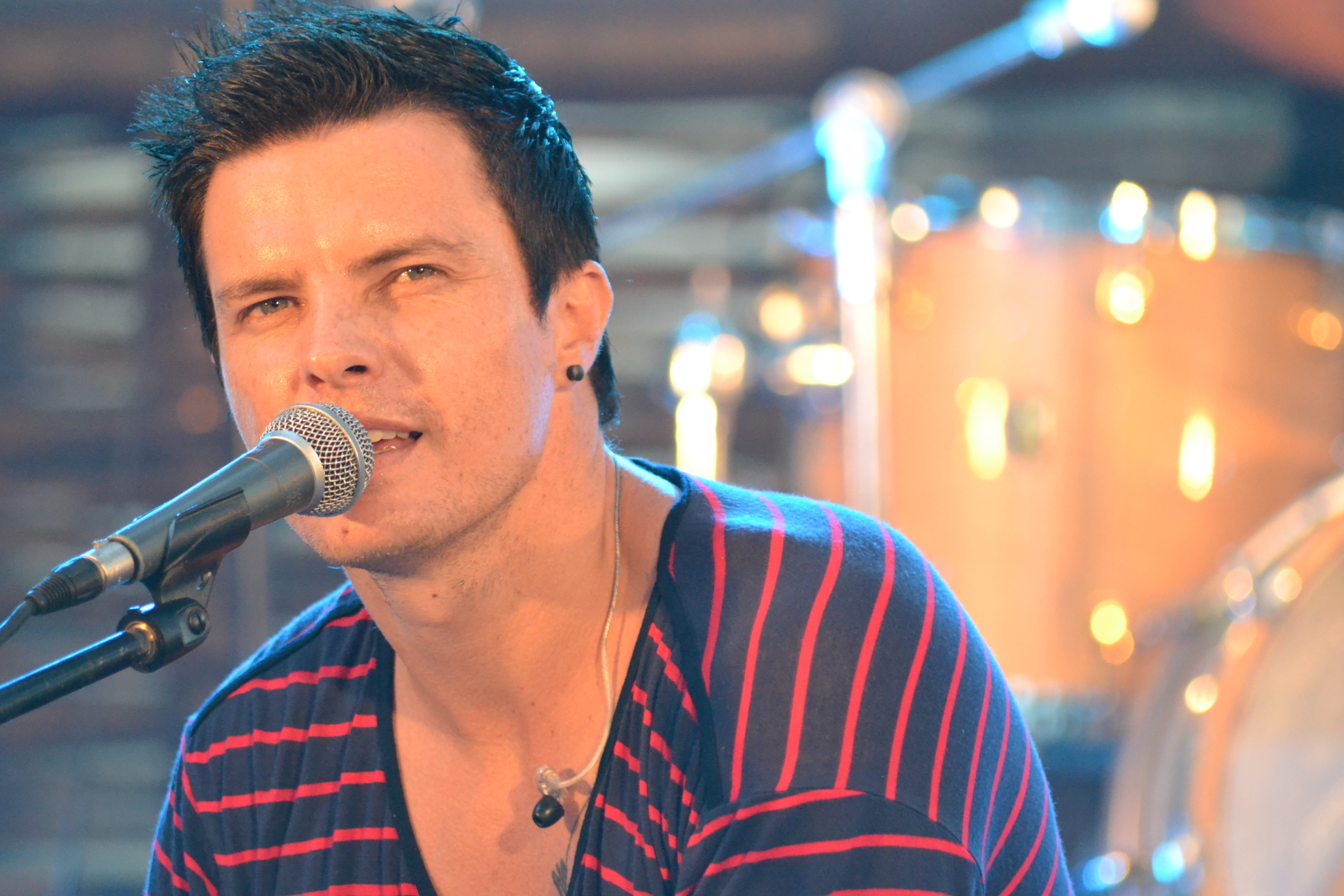
Elvis Blue at Paul Cluver Amphitheatre 2013

Hoogendyk has supported a variety of community upliftment projects in South Africa over the course of his career.

- 46664, an initiative inspired the legacy of Nelson Mandela, chose Hoogendyk as an ambassador in 2011.
- Rays of Hope, a community outreach project by Rosebank Union Church, which is a child-headed households project which supports households of children raising younger siblings within the Alexandra Township in northern Johannesburg.
- Bethesda in George, Western Cape, which provides medical, rehabilitative, developmental, spiritual, psycho-social and family support.
- Life Community Services which assists the disadvantaged community of George, Western Cape.
- Elvis Blue Music Academy, in partnership with Life Community Services, provided musical training for children who are unable to afford musical instruments and music tuition.

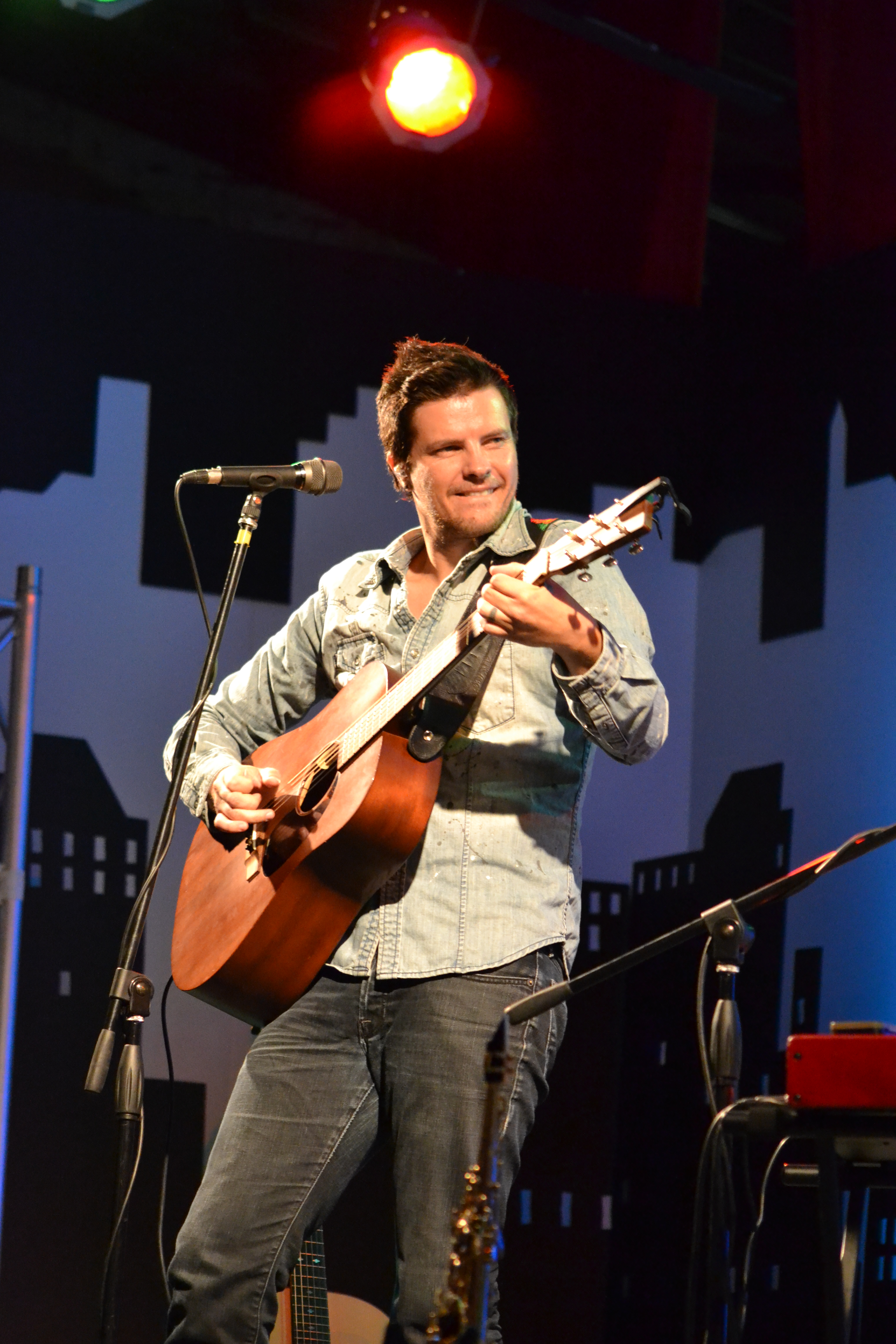
Elvis Blue at the All Star Theater 2014

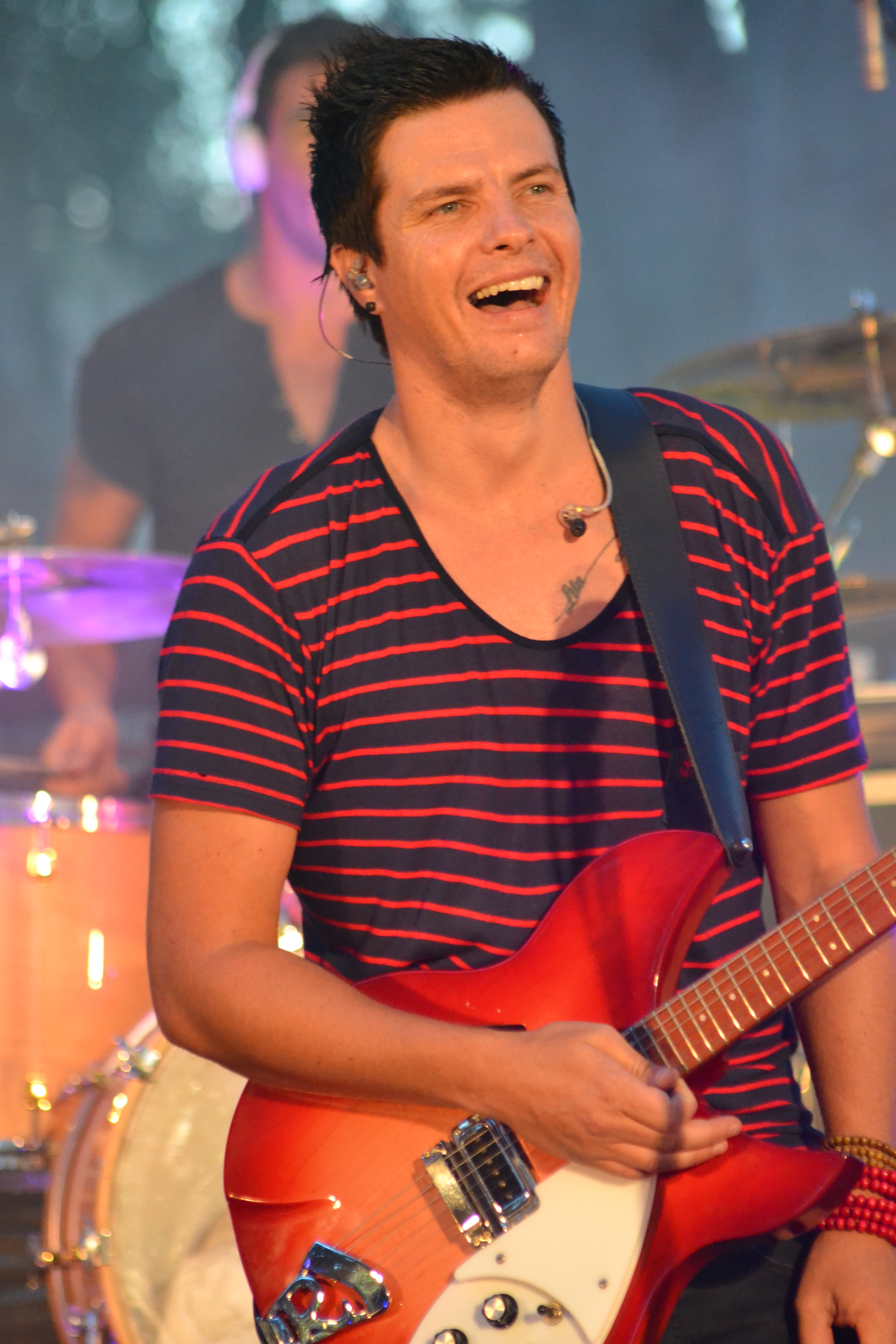
Elvis Blue at Paul Cluver Amphitheatre 2013

== Awards ==
List of awards and nominations received by Elvis Blue
Year	Event	Prize	Nominated work	Result	Ref
2016	5th Annual Ghoema Awards	Best Contemporary Album by Male Artist	Êrens in die middel van nêrens	Won	
2016	5th Annual Ghoema Awards	Male Artist of the Year	Êrens in die middel van nêrens	Won	
2016	5th Annual Ghoema Awards	Music Video of the Year	Die hemel	Won	
2016	5th Annual Ghoema Awards	Music Video of the Year	Êrens in die middel van nêrens	Nominated	
2016	5th Annual Ghoema Awards	Song of the Year	Die hemel	Nominated	
2016	5th Annual Ghoema Awards	Songwriter of the Year	Êrens in die middel van nêrens	Won	
2016	5th Annual Ghoema Awards	Live DVD of the Year	Hart & see	Won	
2015	5th Annual Bok Radio Awards (Bokkies)	Album of the Year	Êrens in die middel van nêrens	Nominated	
2015	5th Annual Bok Radio Awards (Bokkies)	Male Artist of the Year	Êrens in die middel van nêrens	Nominated	
2015	5th Annual Bok Radio Awards (Bokkies)	Song of the Year	Die Hemel	Won	
2015	5th Annual Bok Radio Awards (Bokkies)	Music Video of the Year	Shine	Nominated	
2014	Huisgenoot Tempo Awards	Contemporary Album of the Year	Afrikaans	Won	
2014	Huisgenoot Tempo Awards	Song of the Year	Rede om te glo	Nominated	
2014	Huisgenoot Tempo Awards	Music Video of the Year	Rede om te glo	Nominated	
2014	3rd Annual Ghoema Awards	Album of the Year	Afrikaans	Won	
2014	3rd Annual Ghoema Awards	Male Artist of the Year	Afrikaans	Won	
2014	3rd Annual Ghoema Awards	Song of the Year	Rede om te glo	Nominated	
2014	3rd Annual Ghoema Awards	Best Contemporary Album by Male Artist	Afrikaans	Nominated	
2014	3rd Annual Ghoema Awards	Songwriter of the Year	Afrikaans	Nominated	
2014	20th Annual South African Music Awards	Best Afrikaans Adult Contemporary Album	Afrikaans	Won	
2013	19th Annual South African Music Awards	Best Adult Contemporary Album	Journey	Won	
2013	19th Annual South African Music Awards	Male Artist of the Year	Journey	Nominated	
2013	19th Annual South African Music Awards	MTN SAMA Record of the Year	Lifeline	Nominated	
2012	18th Annual South African Music Awards	Best Adult Contemporary Album	Elvis Blue Special Ed	Won	
2012	18th Annual South African Music Awards	MTN SAMA Record of the Year	Lighthouse	Nominated	

=== Other Awards ===
- In 2015, Hoogendyk won the prestigious Wawela Music Award, awarded by SAMRO, in the category "Best Male Artist and Composer"
- For his charitable work and influence, Hoogendyk also received a CEO Magazine/Titans - Building Nations Recognition Award for the SA and SADC regions in the Art and Culture Category in 2015.
- In 2018, Hoogendyk's music production SAAM won a Toyota US Woordfees award for "Best Production by a Solo Artist".
- The Festival Production, Meer as Genoeg was also nominated by the Toyota US Woordfees in the category "Best performance: Contemporary music production (podium) - solo/duo driven".

== Discography ==
=== Singles ===
- 2010: Things My Father Said
- 2011: Lighthouse
- 2011: Save Me
- 2012: Right Here, Right Now
- 2012: Lifeline
- 2012: That's What We Do
- 2013: Not Gonna Say Goodbye
- 2013: Rede om te Glo (Reason to Believe)
- 2013: Spore (Footprints)
- 2014: Toe Ons Jonk Was (When We Were Young)
- 2014: Mooi (Beautiful)
- 2015: Shine

=== Albums ===
==== 2010: Elvis Blue ====
Track Listing

1. Save Me
2. Lighthouse
3. I'm on Fire
4. Things My Father Said
5. Only Wanna Be With You
6. Little Hero
7. Lightly Tread
8. Lately
9. Right Here, Right Now
10. Lover
11. Stay
12. Believe
13. To Make You Feel My Love

==== 2012: Journey ====
Track Listing

1. Glory Road
2. Lifeline
3. That's What We Do
4. Anchor
5. Not Gonna Say Goodbye
6. Be More
7. Journey
8. All You Need To Know
9. Come Alive
10. Closer
11. Be The One
12. Never Give Up on You
13. Home

==== 2013: Afrikaans ====
Track Listing

1. Toe Ons Jonk Was
2. Rede Om Te Glo
3. Mooi
4. Horison
5. Dromer
6. Vriende
7. Hoop in Die Donker
8. Liefling
9. Spore
10. Steel
11. R20 000
12. Hillbrow

== Gallery ==
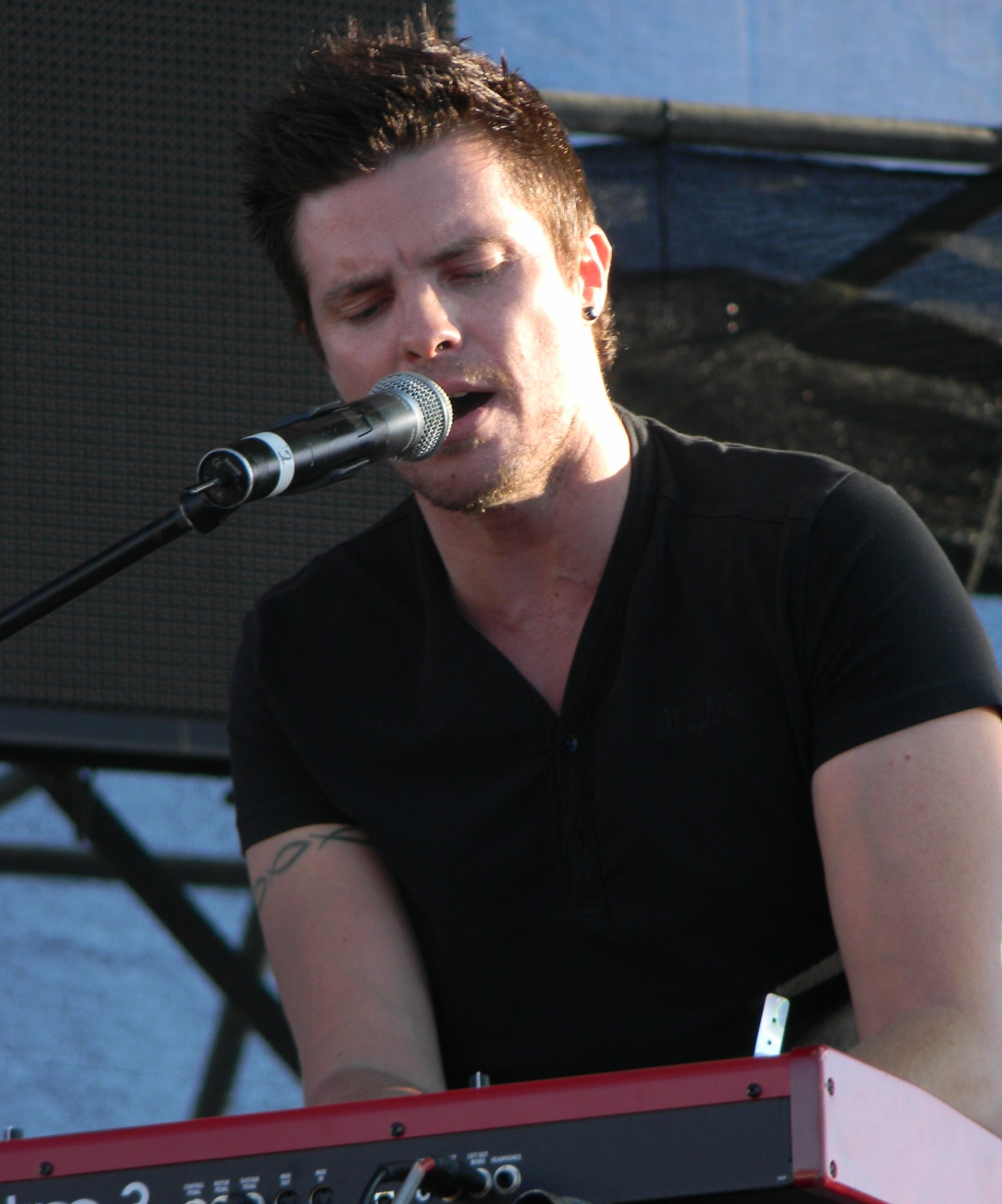
Elvis Blue at K-Day 2012

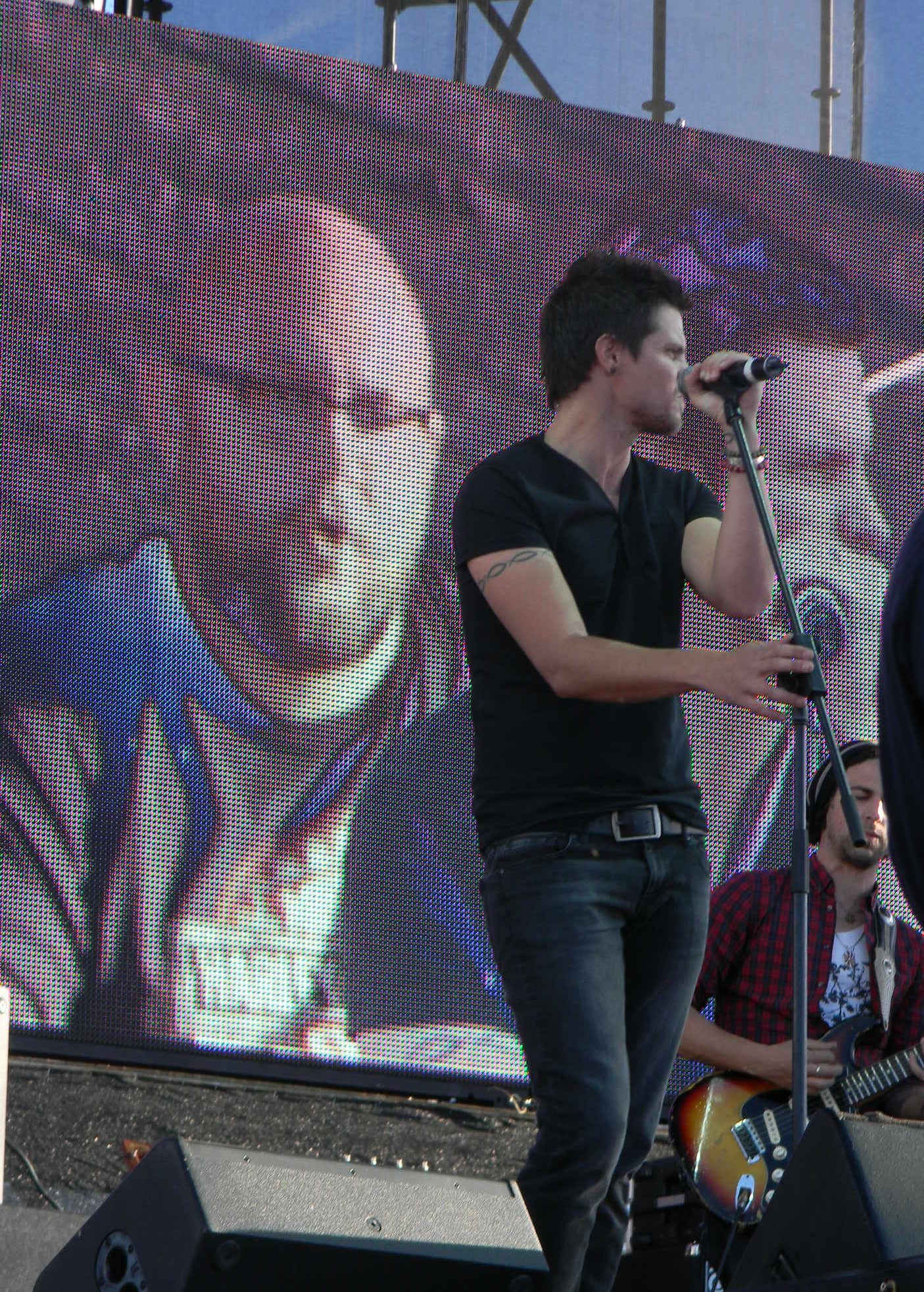
Elvis Blue at K-day 2012

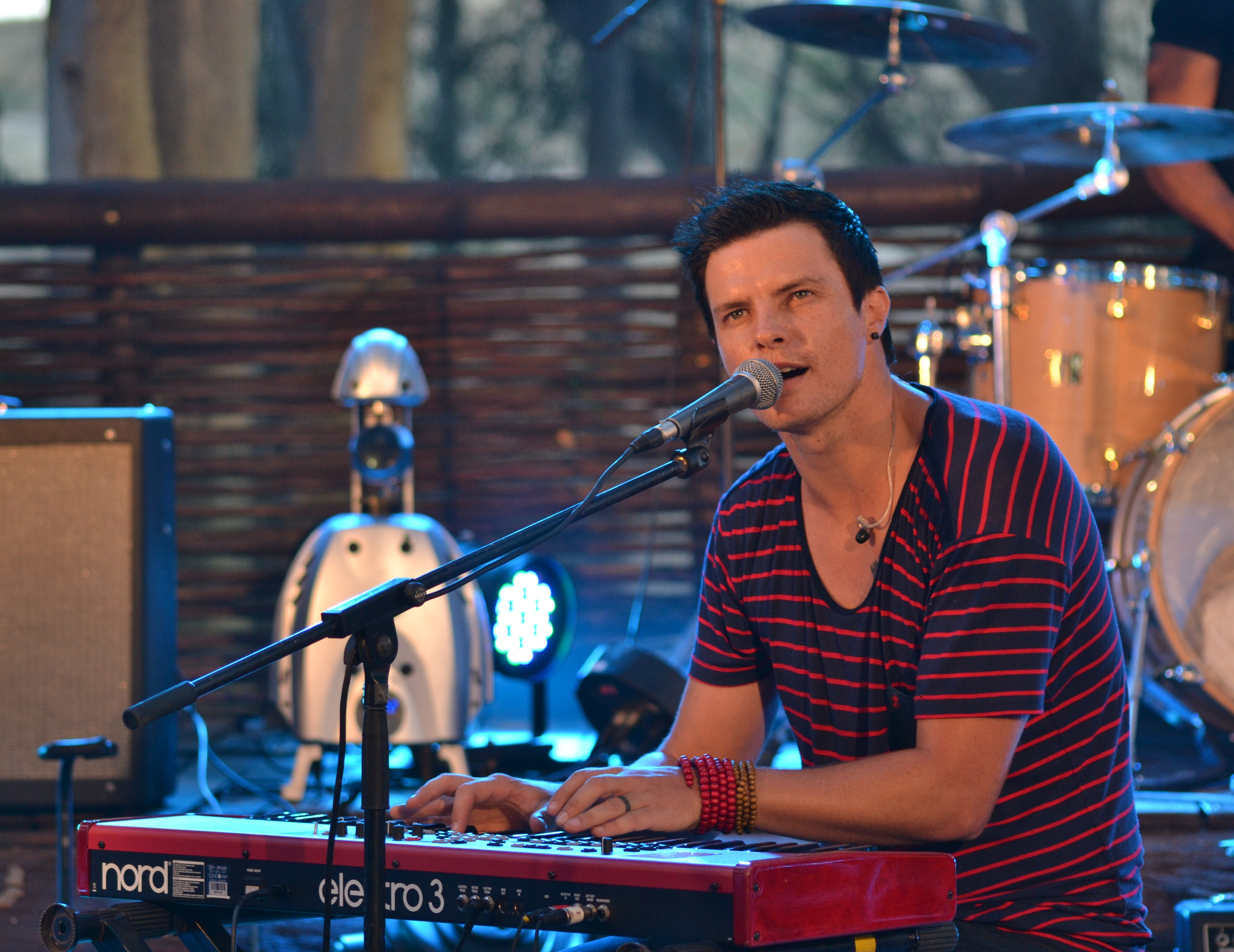
Elvis Blue at Paul Cluver Amphitheatre 2013

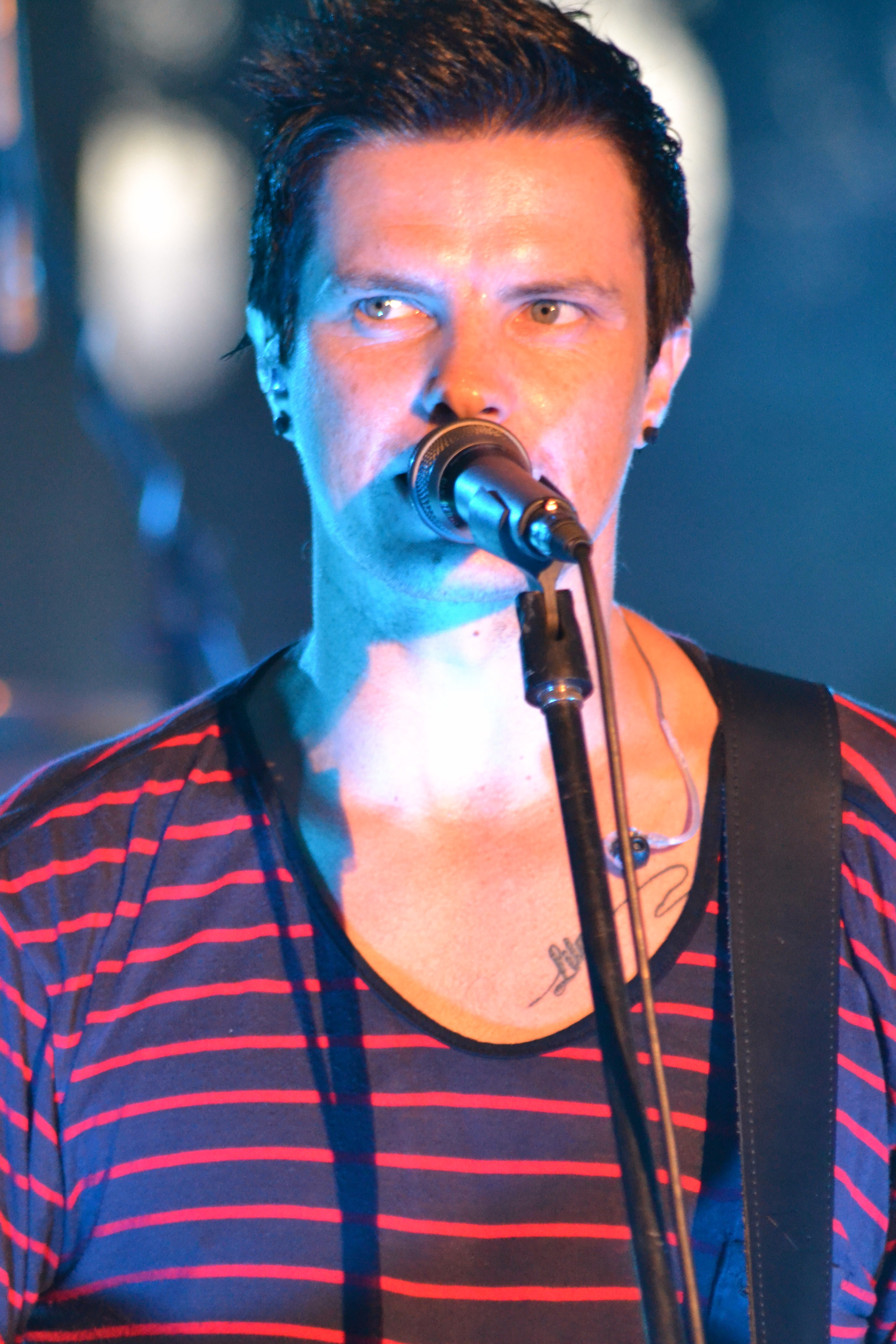
Elvis Blue at Paul Cluver Amphitheatre 2013

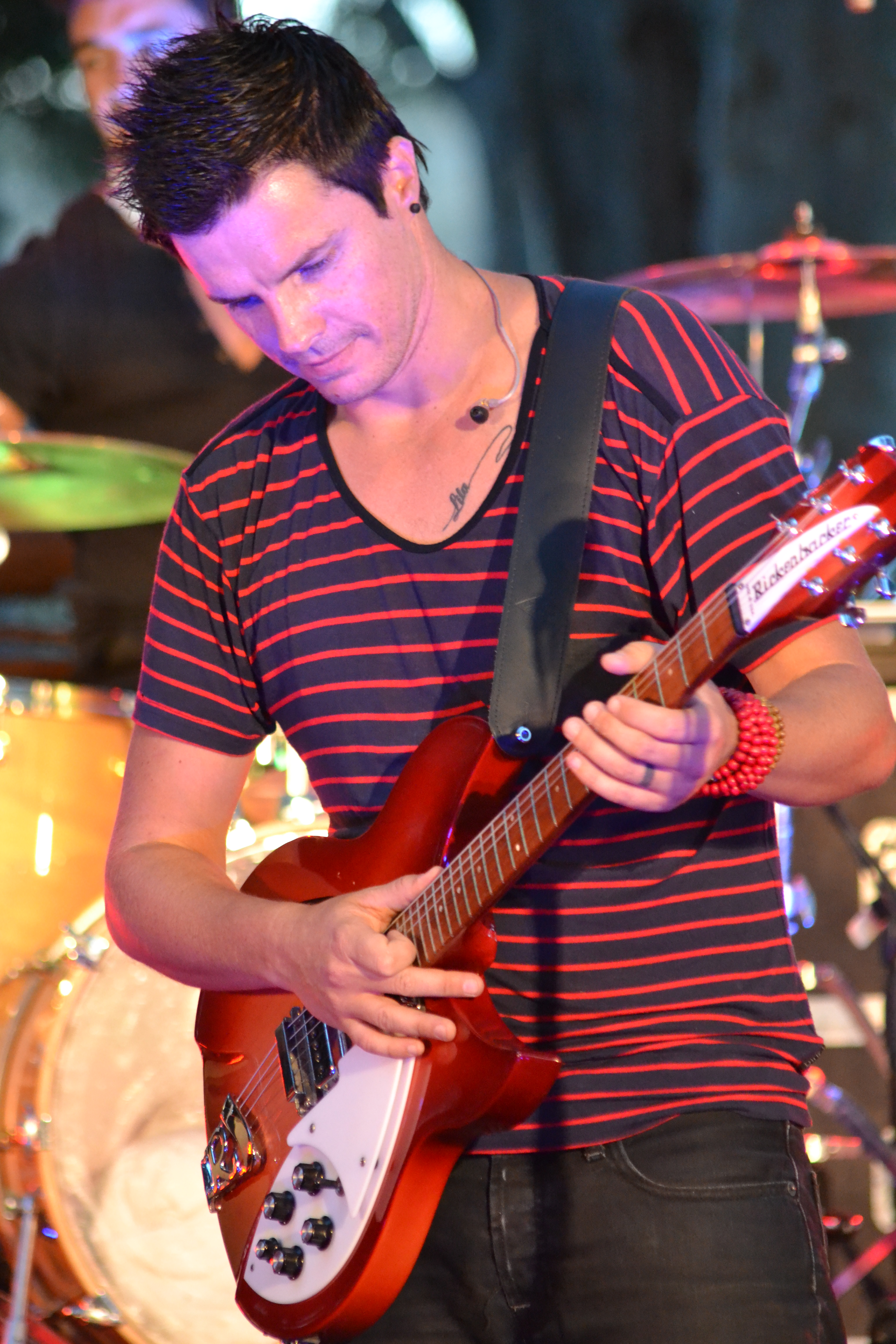
Elvis Blue at Paul Cluver Amphitheatre 2013

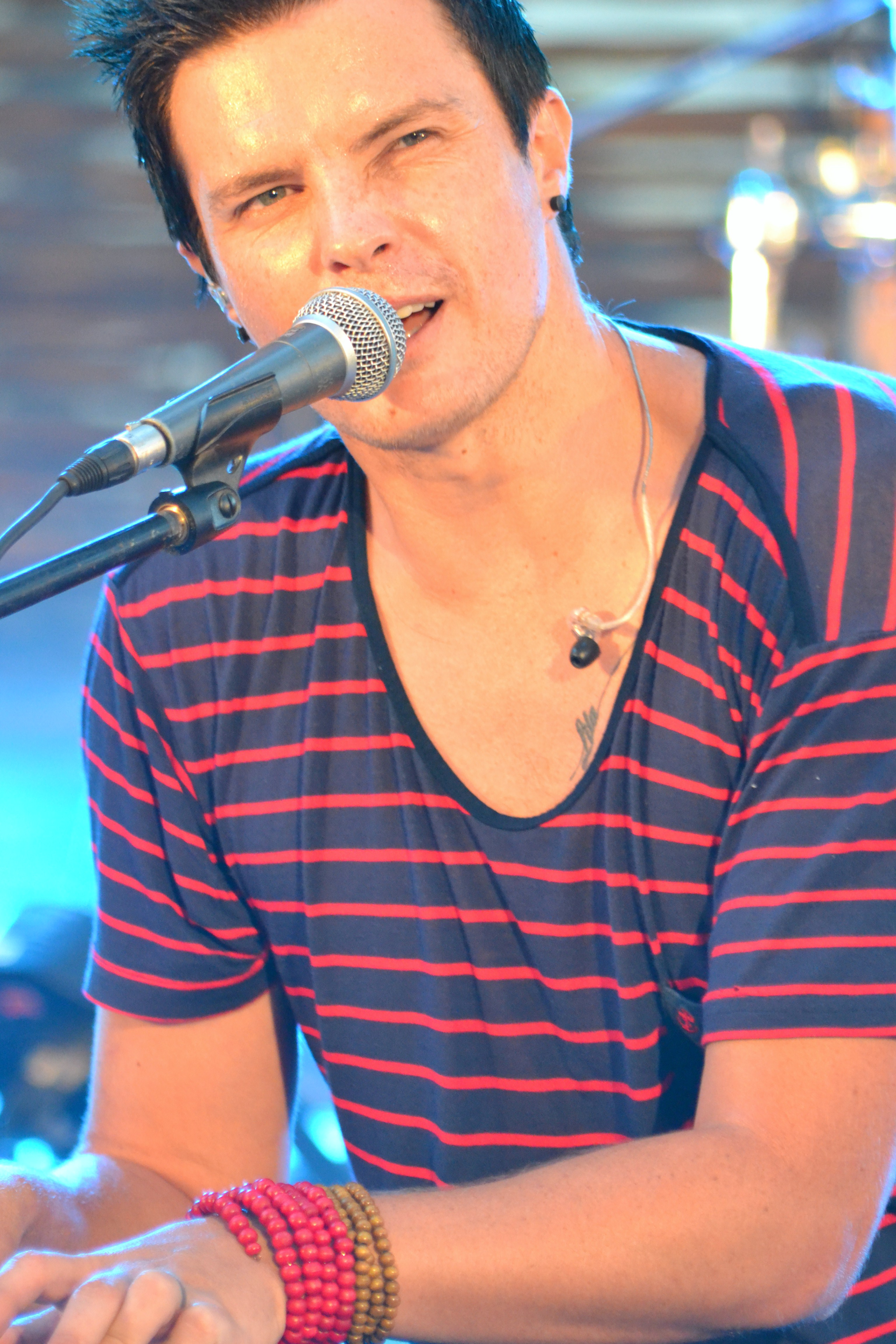
Elvis Blue at Paul Cluver Amphitheatre 2013

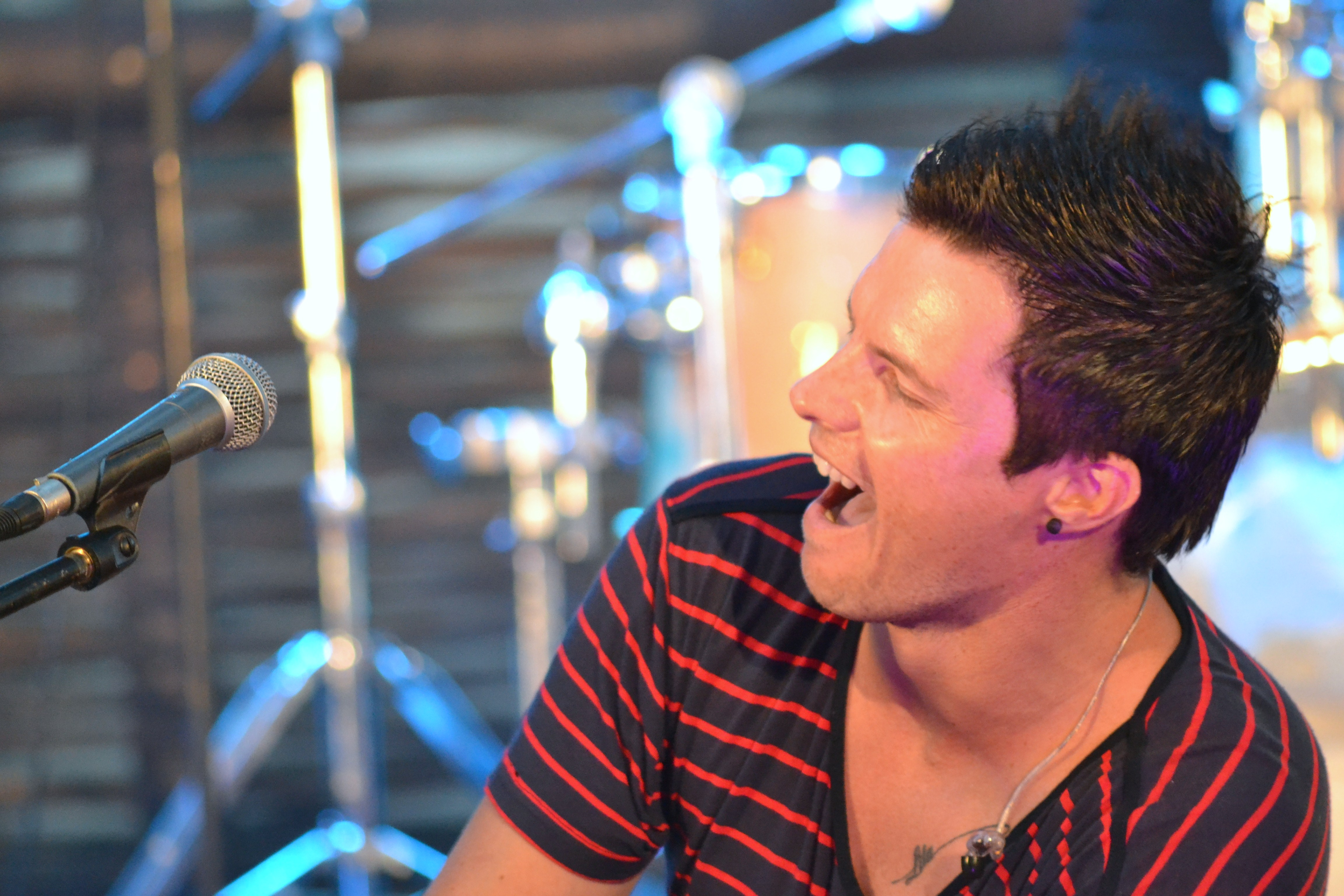
Elvis Blue at Paul Cluver Amphitheatre 2013

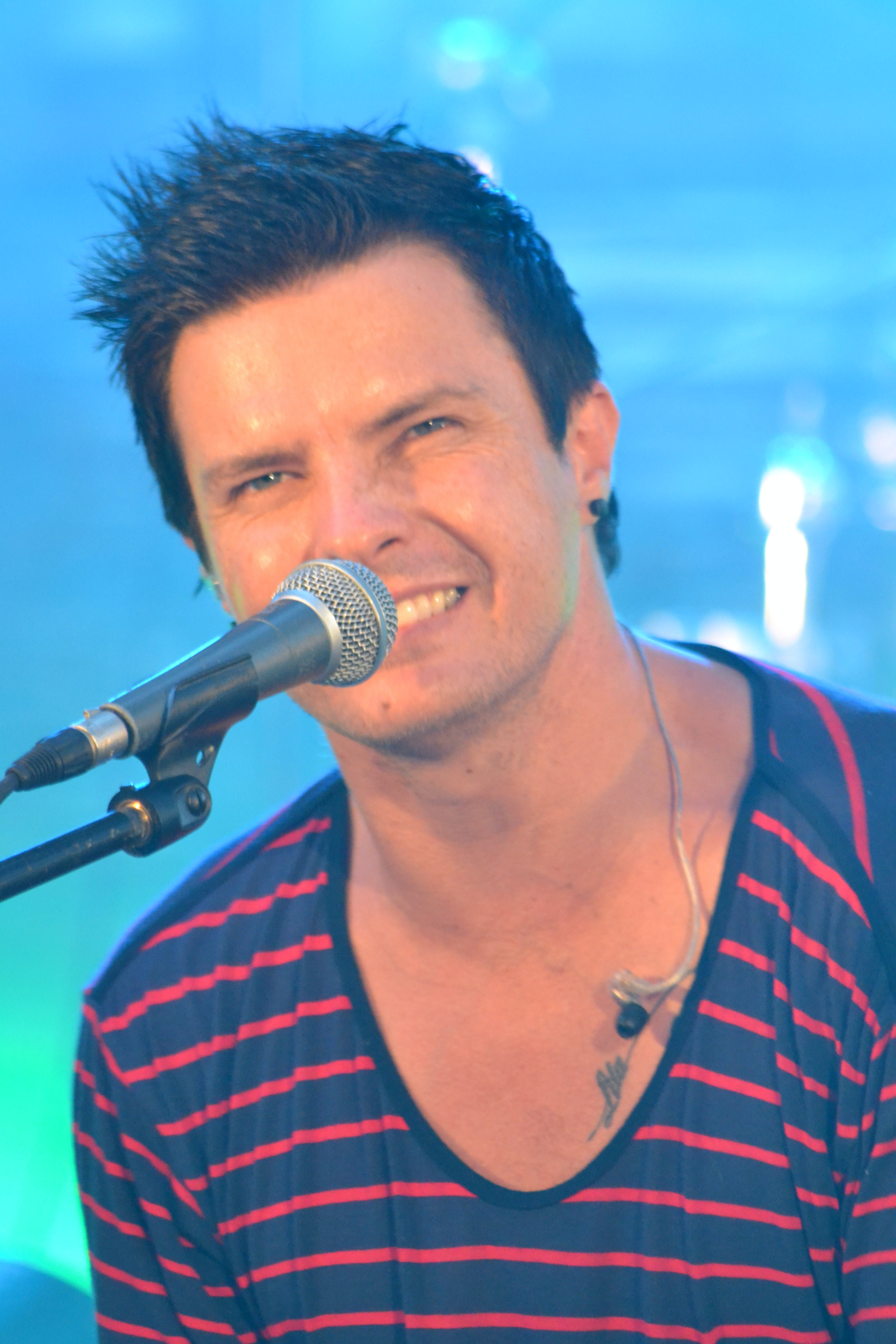
Elvis Blue at Paul Cluver Amphitheatre 2013

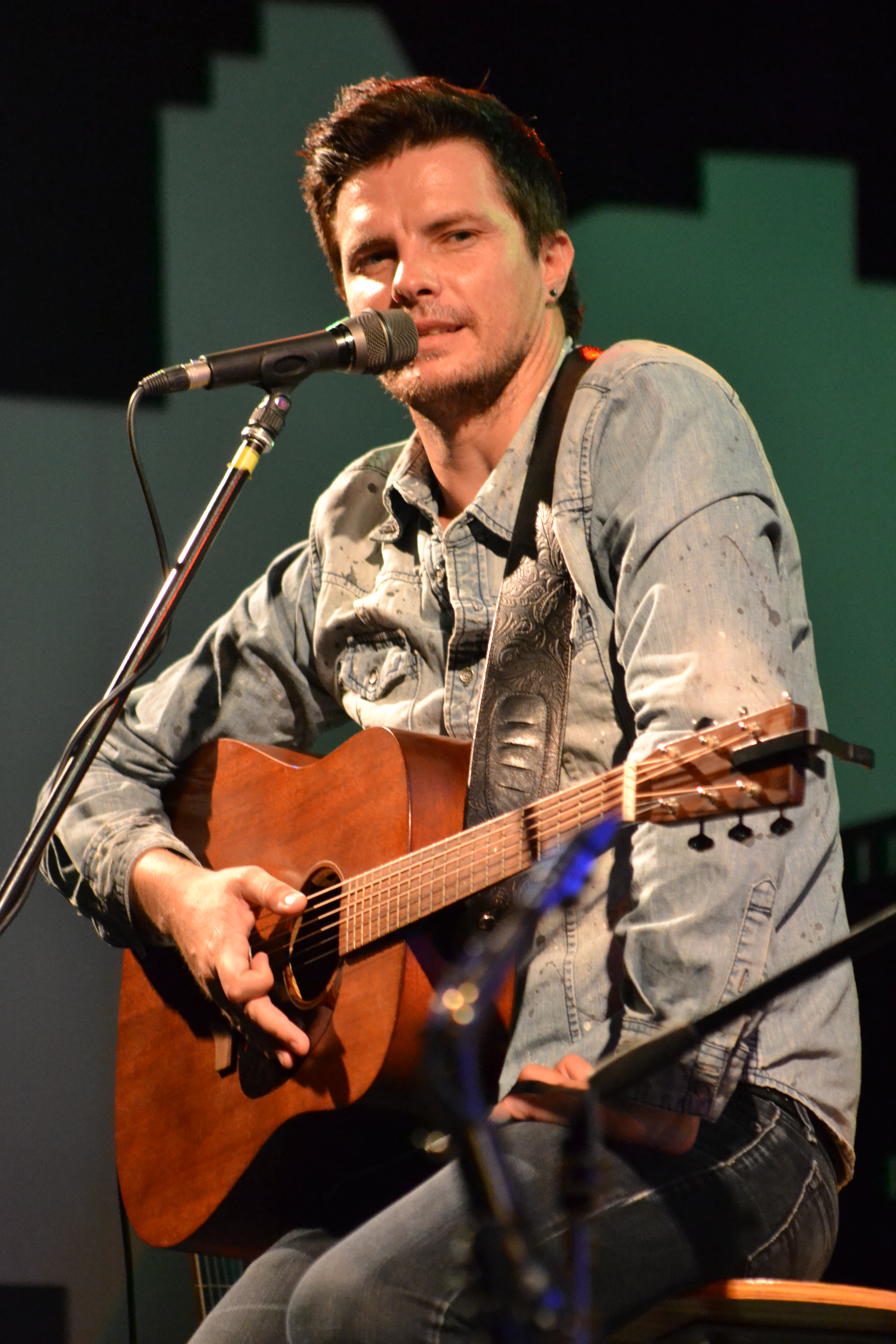
Elvis Blue at the All Star Theater 2014

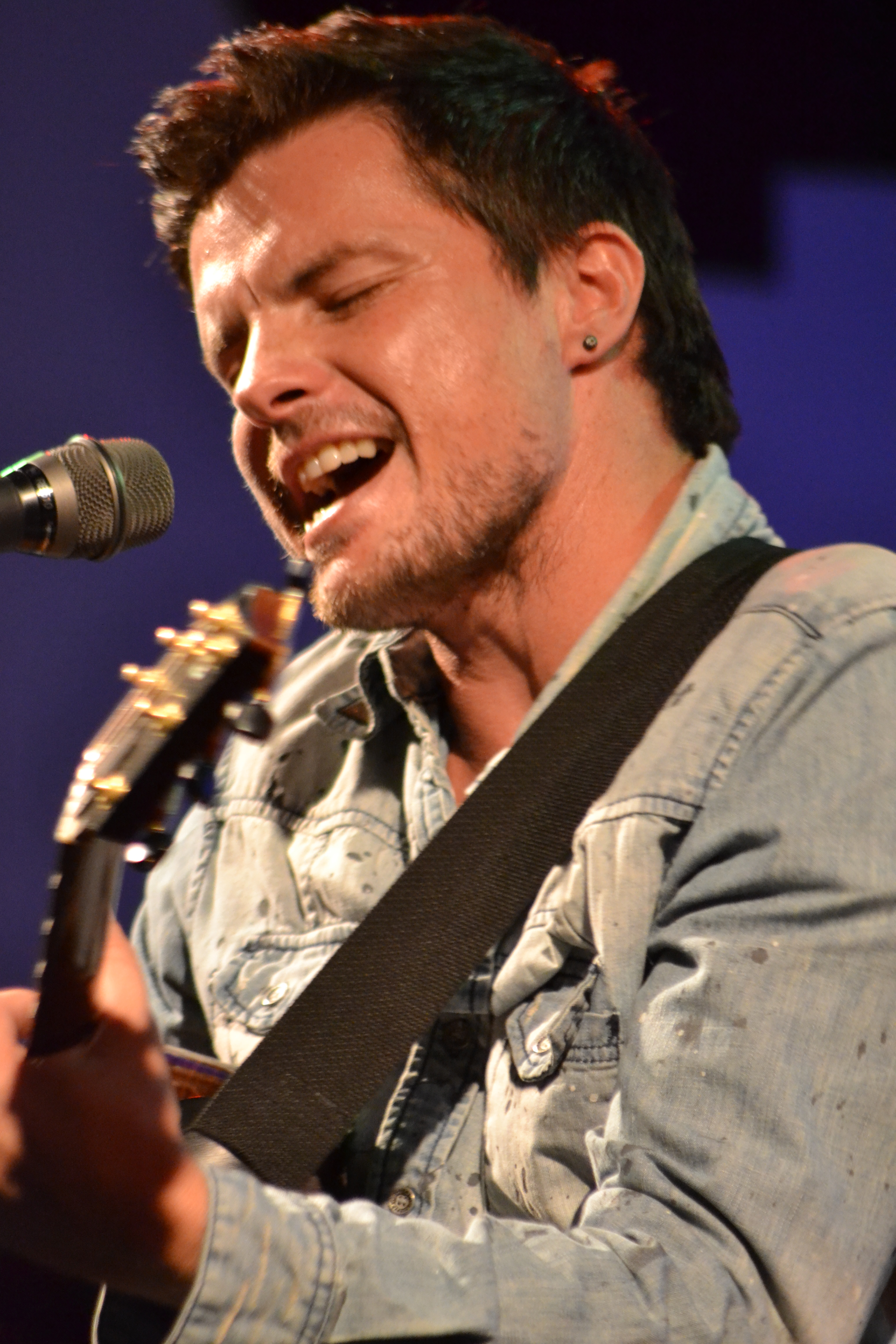
Elvis Blue at the All Star Theater 2014

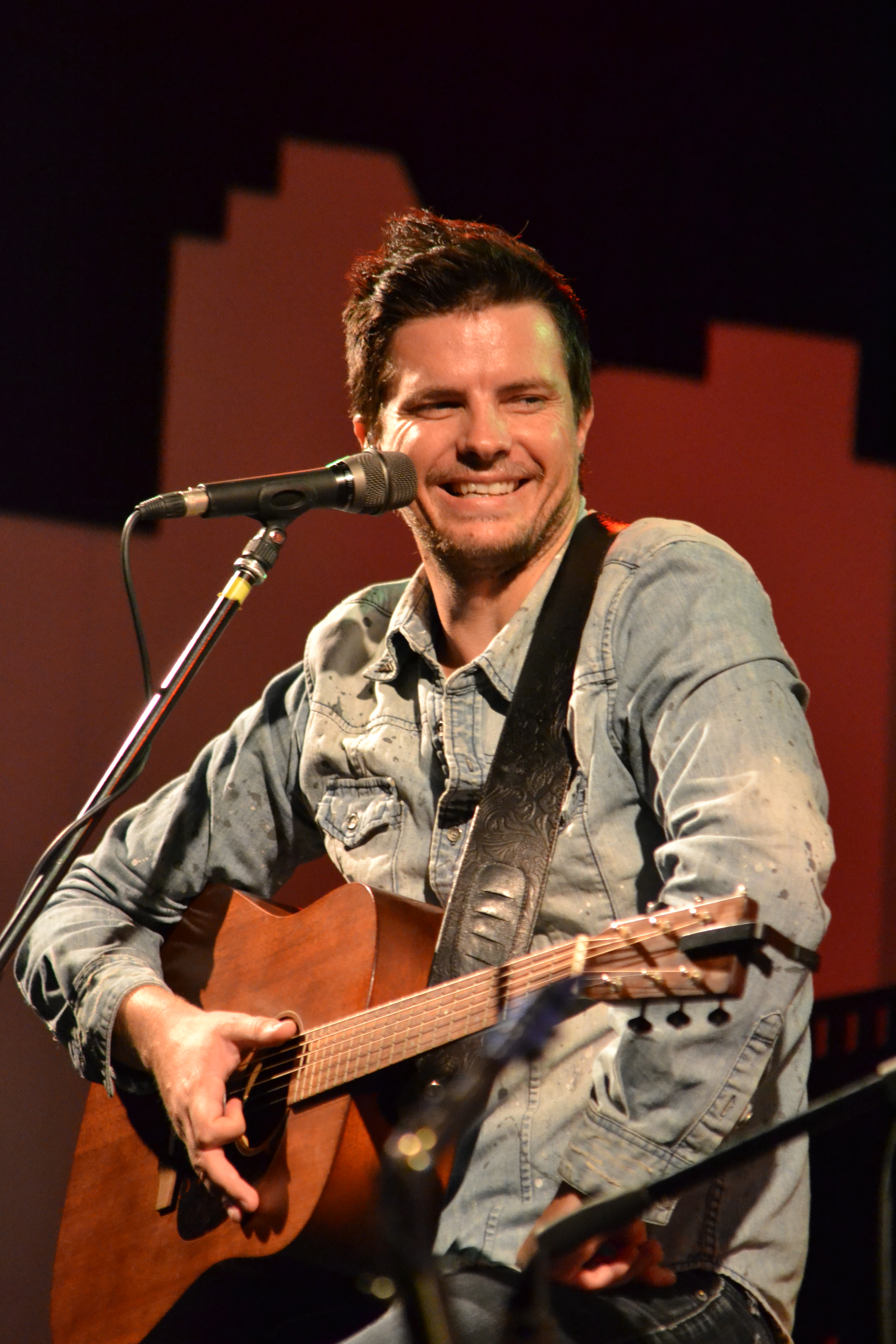
Elvis Blue at the All Star Theater 2014

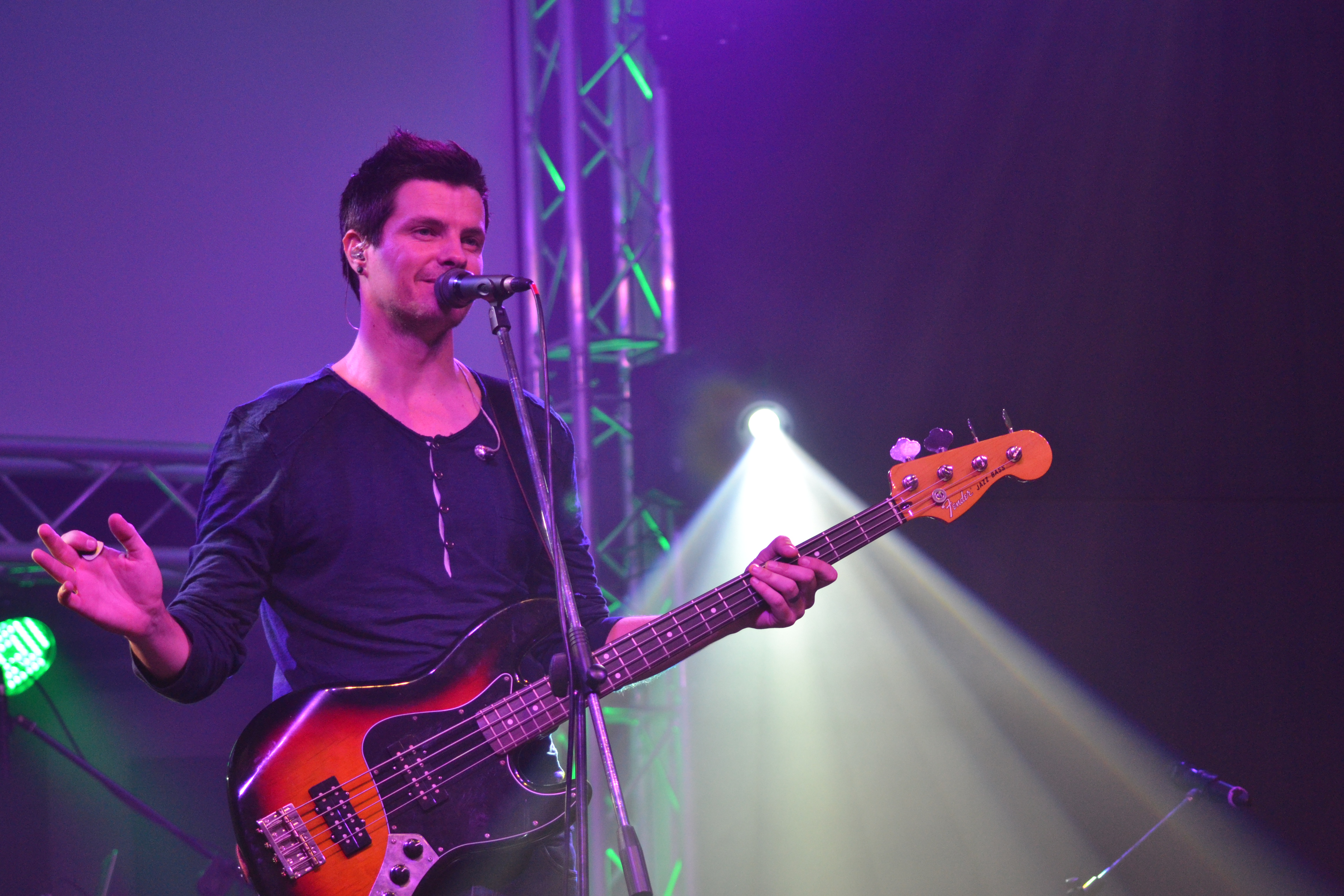
Elvis Blue performing in 2014
