= Shout It Out Loud (Robin S & DJ Escape song) =

"Shout It Out Loud!"

Single by Robin S. featuring DJ Escape
- Released: 6 November 2015
- Genre: Deep house Garage
- Length: 8:18 (original mix); 4:16 (radio edit)
- Label: Groovilicious
- Songwriter(s): Robin Stone
- Producer(s): Jeff Jonas; Tony Coluccio

Robin S. singles chronology
"So Alive" (2014)	"Shout It Out Loud!" (2015)

DJ Escape singles chronology
"Music Takes Me Higher" (2001)	"Shout It Out Loud!" (2015)

"Shout It Out Loud!" is a garage/house dance track recorded and written by American singer Robin S. featuring remixer/musician Jeff "DJ Escape" Jonas, who co-produced the single with fellow remixer/producer Tony Coluccio. The digital downloaded single reached number one on Billboard's Dance Club Songs chart the week ending January 30, 2016, thus ending a nearly 19-year gap between number-one Dance Club Songs singles for Robin S., when her remake of "It Must Be Love" reached the top spot on June 28, 1997, and marked the first chart topper for Jonas.

== Track listing ==
2015 release (US)

- Shout It Out Loud! (DJ Escape & Tony Coluccio Mix) 8:18
- Shout It Out Loud! (DJ Escape & Tony Coluccio Dub) 7:03
- Shout It Out Loud! (DJ Escape & Tony Coluccio Radio Edit) 4:16
- Shout It Out Loud! (Chris Sammarco Club Mix) 5:59
- Shout It Out Loud! (Chris Sammarco Radio Edit) 2:49
- Shout It Out Loud! (Tom Stephan Mix) 7:52

== Chart performance ==
=== Weekly charts ===
Chart (2015–16)	Peak position
US Dance Club Songs (Billboard)	1
US Dance/Electronic Songs (Billboard)	25

=== Year-end charts ===
Chart (2016)	Position
US Dance Club Songs (Billboard)	31
