= Louise Carver (South African singer) =

Louise Ceri Carver
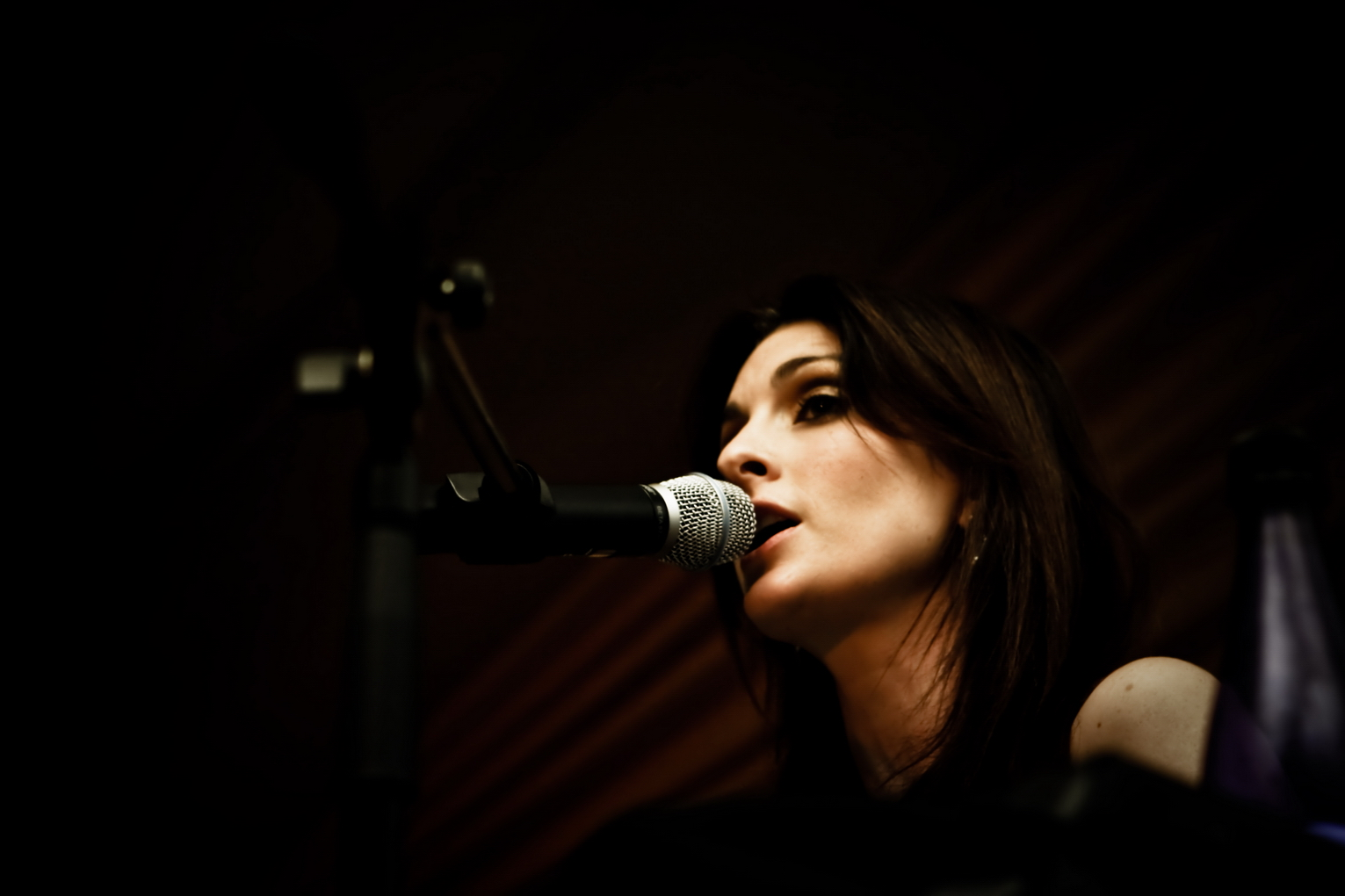

Background information
- Born: 10 January 1979 (age 47); Cape Town
- Genre: African Pop Folk
- Occupation: Singer
- Years active: 1995 to present
- Label: Sony BMG
- Website: www.louisecarver.com

Louise Carver (born 10 January 1979) is a South African African Pop folk singer-songwriter and pianist.

Carver was born in Cape Town, and holds dual citizenship in South Africa and the United Kingdom. She began playing piano at the age of 11, and received her first recording contract at the age of 15. She matriculated at the Rustenburg School for Girls, matriculating in 1996. She earned an honours degree in Politics, Philosophy and Economics from the University of Cape Town in 2002.

== Music ==
Carver released her first single, It Don't Matter (1996) when she was 17. The single topped the South African National Campus Charts. It spent 11 weeks on the South African National Top 40 Charts, where it peaked at the number three position. At age 18 she followed the single with her debut album, Mirrors and Windows (1998).

First for Women, a South African insurance company, sponsored Carver's 2008 Home Tour.

Two of her singles with house DJ Joe Bermudez - "Sunrise" (2016) and "Crazy Enough" (2018) - reached number one on the Billboard Dance Club Songs chart.

=== Studio albums ===
- Mirrors and Windows (1998)
- Looking Around (2002)
- Silent Scream (2005)
- Saved by the Moonlight (2007)
- Look to the Edge (2010)
- Say It to My Face (2013)
- Hanging in the Void (2016)

=== Singles ===
- "It Don't Matter" (1996)
- "Not Here" (2000)
- "Play the Game" (2003), a collaboration with Kenny Hawkes
- "Sunrise" (2016), with Joe Bermudez
- "Lift Off" (2016)
- "Keep Your Eyes on Me" (2017)
- "This Thing called Love" (2017)
- "Crazy Enough" (2018), with Joe Bermudez

== Critical response ==
Channel24 gave a favorable review of Carver in 2009. In June 2010, the City Press said that Carver's Look to the Edge album "has an edgy electronic/pop sound with infusions of South African rhythms and percussion, [and] will appeal to South African and global audiences alike... This 12-track album is unique and diverse. It’s easy listening and has something for everyone."
