= Shout =

Shout or Shouts may refer to:

- Shout (sound), a loud vocalization

== Films and television ==
- The Shout, a 1978 film by Jerzy Skolimowski
- Shout! The Story of Johnny O'Keefe, 1986 television movie about the Australian singer
- Shout (film), a 1991 movie starring John Travolta
- Shout, a character on the children's television series The Fresh Beat Band
- Shout! Awards, a former Malaysian entertainment award
- Shout! Studios, an American home video and music company

== Music ==
- Shout (Black gospel music), a form of exuberant, fast-paced church music originating among slaves in the southern United States.
- Shout (band), a Christian rock band in the late 1980s
- Shout Records, a record label
- Shout! The Mod Musical , a Broadway musical featuring songs from the 1960s
- Shout! The Legend of The Wild One, a musical based on the life of Johnny O'Keefe

=== Albums ===
- Shout! (Isley Brothers album), by The Isley Brothers
- Shout (Devo album)
- Shout! (Gov't Mule album)

=== Songs ===
- "Shout" (Ant & Dec song), by PJ & Duncan
- "Shout" (Isley Brothers song), by the Isley Brothers, covered by Lulu, The Beatles and many others
- "Shout" (Tears for Fears song), by Tears for Fears, covered by many artists, including as "Shout 2000" by Disturbed
- "Shout" (Black Tide song)
- "Shout" (Shout for England song), an unofficial England national football team Fifa World Cup 2010 anthem
- "Shout!", B-side of Depeche Mode's single "New Life"
- "Shout", B-side of Michael Jackson's single "Cry"
- "Shouts", a song by P.O.D. from The Fundamental Elements of Southtown
- "Shout!!!", a Japanese song by Idoling

== People ==
- Alfred Shout (1882–1915), Australian soldier awarded the Victoria Cross

== Published works ==
- Shout (magazine), a magazine for teenage girls in the United Kingdom
- Shout!: The Beatles in Their Generation, a book by Philip Norman
- Shout NY, a magazine from New York City in the late 1990s and early 1960s
- Shout (memoir), a poetic memoir by Laurie Halse Anderson

== Other uses ==
- Shout, an Australian, British, Canadian, Irish, and New Zealand term for paying for a round of drinks or other similar transaction.
- Shout, a household cleaning product produced by S. C. Johnson
- Shout, or ring shout, a religious dance originating among African slaves in the Americas
- Shouting (computing), using all caps on social media, which is considered rude
- Shout, a term for a sea rescue mission by the Royal National Lifeboat Institution

== See also ==
- "Shout! Shout! (Knock Yourself Out)", a 1962 song
- Showt, a city in Iran
