= Idols South Africa season 19 =

Idols South Africa
- Season 19
- Hosted by: ProVerb
- Judges: Somizi Mhlongo; Thembi Seete; JR
- Winner: Thabo Ndlovu
- Runner-up: Princess MacDonald

Release
- Original network: Mzansi Magic; Mzansi Wethu
- Original release: 8 July – 4 November 2023

Season chronology
- ← Previous; Season 18

The nineteenth and final season of South African Idols premiered on 8 July 2023 on the Mzansi Magic and Mzansi Wethu television networks, under the themes "iLast Number" and "The Farewell Season". The season was won by Thabo Ndlovu, while Princess MacDonald was the runner-up.

On 5 February 2023, it was announced that auditions for the final season would commence on 12 February 2023. The live shows began on 19 August 2023, with the ladies taking to stage first.

== Finalists ==
Contestant	Age	Hometown	Place finished
Thabo Ndlovu	26	Witbank, Mpumalanga	Winner
Princess MacDonald	24	Bushbuckridge, Mpumalanga	Runner-up
Faith Nakana	26	Lebowakgomo, Limpopo	3rd
Nkosi Shange	29	Durban, KwaZulu-Natal	4th
Niikiey Kubheka	18	Vosloorus, Gauteng	5th
Envic Booysen	25	Cape Town, Western Cape	6th
Thando Mdluli	22	Orange Farm, Gauteng	7th
Sena Mkhwanazi	28	Durban, KwaZulu-Natal	8th
Lungelo Motaung	28	Johannesburg, Gauteng	9th
Lungile Mthethwa	24	Benoni, Gauteng	10th
Sipho Manana	19	Johannesburg, Gauteng	11th
Neve Arnolds	22	Stellenbosch, Western Cape	12th

== Weekly Song Choice and Results ==
=== Top 12: Duets With Former Idols ===
==== Ladies (19 August) ====
Act	Order	Song — Duets With Former Idols	Order	Song — Solo	Result
Lungile	1	"Not Yet Uhuru" by Letta Mbulu (sung with Yanga)	2	"Intliziyo" by Lloyiso ft. Langa Mavuso	Safe
Niikiey	3	"Make a Way" by Spirit of Praise ft. Mmatema (sung with Mmatema)	4	"Intliziyo" by Zonke	Safe
Neve	5	"Over the Rainbow" by Judy Garland (sung with Paxton)	6	"Mirror" by Madison Ryann Ward	Eliminated
Lungelo	7	"Safe" by Karabo ft. Tineke (sung with Karabo)	8	"Golden" by Jill Scott	Safe
Sena	9	"Lonely Without You" by Lloyiso (sung with Lloyiso)	10	"Sana Lwami" by Woza Sabza ft. Jessica LM	Safe
Princess	11	"Xolele" by Musa ft. Zama Khumalo (sung with Musa)	12	"Russian Roulette" by Rihanna	Safe

==== Gents (26 August) ====
Act	Order	Song — Duets With Former Idols	Order	Song — Solo	Result
Thando	1	"Khakhathi" by Karabo (sung with Karabo)	2	"Noma" by Kaylow	Safe
Faith	3	"So Will I (100 Billion X)" by Hillsong United (sung with Yanga)	4	"Tjontjobina" by Bhudaza	Safe
Nkosi	5	"Wozala" by Musa ft. Ntsika & Tshego AMG (sung with Musa)	6	"Nemimoya" by Nathi	Safe
Envic	7	"Battleground" by Paxton (sung with Paxton)	8	"It's a Man's Man's Man's World" by James Brown	Safe
Sipho	9	"Seasons" by Lloyiso (with Lloyiso)	10	"Don't Judge Me" by Chris Brown	Eliminated
Thabo	11	"My Time Is Now!" by Mmatema (with Mmatema)	12	"Signed, Sealed, Delivered (I'm Yours)" by Stevie Wonder	Safe

=== Top 10: New Kids on the Block (2 September) ===
Act	Order	Song	Result
Nkosi	1	"Ubuhle Bakho" by Ami Faku	Safe
Lungile	2	"Mina Nawe" by Soamattrix & Mashudu ft. Happy Jazzman & Emotionz DJ	Eliminated
Faith	3	"Imvula" by Murumba Pitch & Omit ST ft. Russell Zuma & Sipho Magudulela	Safe
Sena	4	"Ngibambe La" by Mthunzi	Safe
Niikiey	5	"Umona" by Nomfundo Moh	Safe
Envic	6	"ICU" by Coco Jones	Safe
Princess	7	"Monalisa" by Lojay, Sarz & Chris Brown	Safe
Thabo	8	"Molo" by Aubrey Qwana	Safe
Lungelo	9	"Fatela" by Aymos & Ami Faku	Safe
Thando	10	"Hamba Juba" by Lady Amar, JL SA, Cici & Murumba Pitch	Safe

=== Top 9: Ultimate South African Wedding Playlist (9 September) ===
Act	Order	Song	Result
Niikiey	1	"Mmatswale" by Malaika	Safe
Lungelo	2	"At Last" by Etta James	Eliminated
Faith	3	"Matswale" by Caiphus Semenya	Safe
Nkosi	4	"Ekhwan Lami" by Phila Dlozi ft. Mthunzi	Safe
Thando	5	"Is This Love" by Bob Marley and the Wailers	Safe
Princess	6	"Phakade" by Lira	Safe
Thabo	7	"A Thousand Years" by Christina Perri	Safe
Envic	8	"When I First Saw You (Duet)" by Jamie Foxx ft. Beyoncé	Safe
Sena	9	"All I Do" by Stevie Wonder	Safe

=== Top 8: Lionel Richie Playbook (16 September) ===
Act	Order	Song	Result
Thando	1	"Love, Oh Love" by Lionel Richie	Safe
Sena	2	"You Are" by Lionel Richie	Eliminated
Envic	3	"I Call It Love" by Lionel Richie	Safe
Niikiey	4	"Easy" by Commodores	Safe
Thabo	5	"We Are the World" by USA for Africa	Safe
Princess	6	"Just Go" by Lionel Richie ft. Akon	Safe
Nkosi	7	"Ballerina Girl" by Lionel Richie	Safe
Faith	8	"Penny Lover" by Lionel Richie	Safe

=== Top 7: Showstopper (23 September) ===
Act	Order	Song	Result
Nkosi	1	"Good Kisser" by Usher	Safe
Niikiey	2	"The Way Ungakhona" by Bongo Maffin	Safe
Faith	3	"Uptown Funk" by Mark Ronson ft. Bruno Mars	Safe
Thando	4	"Caught Up" by Usher	Eliminated
Princess	5	"Criminal" by DJ Mshega ft. Lady Zamar	Safe
Envic	6	"Crazy in Love" by Beyoncé ft. Jay-Z	Safe
Thabo	7	"The Way You Make Me Feel" by Michael Jackson	Safe

- Before the Top 7 performances, Sena had the opportunity to perform Rude Boy by Rihanna.

=== Top 6: How to Do It & Grammy-Nominated Songs (30 September) ===
Act	Order	Song — How to Do It	Order	Song — Grammy-Nominated Song	Result
Envic	1	"Nomvula" by Nathi	7	"When a Man Loves a Woman" by Michael Bolton	Eliminated
Faith	2	"Best Part" by Daniel Caesar ft. H.E.R.	8	"Sexual Healing" by Marvin Gaye	Safe
Niikiey	3	"Inkanyezi" by Mondli Ngcobo	9	"Knock You Down" by Keri Hilson ft. Kanye West & Ne-Yo	Safe
Thabo	4	"I Want to Know What Love Is" by Foreigner	10	"In Love With Another Man" by Jazmine Sullivan	Safe
Nkosi	5	"Kiss from a Rose" by Seal	11	"All of Me" by John Legend	Safe
Princess	6	"Dangerously in Love 2" by Beyoncé	12	"Fallin'" by Alicia Keys	Safe

=== Top 5: Duets With Gospel Stars & Songs by African Stars (7 October) ===
Act	Order	Song — Duets With Gospel Stars	Order	Song — Songs by African Stars	Result
Thabo	1	"Wafika" with Dr Tumi	6	"Peru" by Fireboy DML & Ed Sheeran	Safe
Princess	2	"Ungukuphila" with Xolly Mncwango	7	"For My Hand" by Burna Boy ft. Ed Sheeran	Safe
Niikiey	3	"Ngena Noah" with Betusile Mcinga	8	"Maradona" by Niniola	Eliminated
Faith	4	"Healing Power" with Xolly Mncwango	9	"In My Maserati" by Olakira	Safe
Nkosi	5	"Nomathemba" with Betusile Mcinga	10	"People" by Libianca	Safe

=== Top 4: PJ Morton's Playlist & Perfect Date Love Songs (14 October) ===
Act	Order	Song — PJ Morton's Playlist	Order	Song — Perfect Date Love Songs	Result
Princess	1	"On & On" by Erykah Badu	5	"Shayizandla" by Naima Kay	Safe
Nkosi	2	"Ordinary People" by John Legend	6	"Sondela" by Ringo Madlingozi	Eliminated
Faith	3	"Love" by Musiq Soulchild	7	"Bekezela" by Bekezela	Safe
Thabo	4	"Kiss" by Prince	8	"Ndinike Indawo" by Jaziel Brothers	Safe

=== Top 3: DJ Collaboration, Song of the Season & Hits From Their Idols (21 October) ===
Act	Order	Song — DJ Collaboration	Order	Song — Song of the Season	Order	Song — Hits From Their Idols	Result
Thabo	1	"Inde" by Heavy-K ft. Bucie & Nokwazi	4	"Signed, Sealed, Delivered (I'm Yours)" by Stevie Wonder	7	"You Are" by Hle	Safe
Faith	2	"Piano Ngijabulise" by Deep London ft. Nkosazana Daughter, Murumba Pitch & Jandak1	5	"Tjontjobina" by Bhudaza	8	"Thrrr...Phaaa!" by Selaelo Selota	Eliminated
Princess	3	"Hamba Wena" by Deep London ft. Boohle	6	"Russian Roulette" by Rihanna	9	"Listen" by Beyoncé	Safe

=== Top 2: Idols-Produced Single, Viewers' Choice & Mzansi Classics (28 October) ===
Act	Order	Song — Idols-Produced Single	Order	Song — Viewers' Choice	Order	Song — Mzansi Classics	Result
Princess	1	"You Know I Do" by Princess MacDonald	3	"Fallin'" by Alicia Keys	5	"Umqombothi" by Yvonne Chaka Chaka	Runner-up
Thabo	2	"iSlungu" by Thabo Ndlovu	4	"A Thousand Years" by Christina Perri	6	"Lakutshon' Ilanga" by Miriam Makeba	Winner

- Before his elimination, Faith Nakana performed his single "Khulumela".

== Elimination Chart ==
Colour key

–	Winner
–	Runner-up
–	Eliminated
–	Wild Card
–	Withdrew

Weekly results per act
Act	Top 12		Top 10	Top 9	Top 8	Top 7	Top 6	Top 5	Top 4	Top 3	Top 2: Finale
Act	Ladies	Gents	Top 10	Top 9	Top 8	Top 7	Top 6	Top 5	Top 4	Top 3	Top 2: Finale
Thabo Ndlovu	—N/a	Safe	Safe	Safe	Safe	Safe	Safe	Safe	Safe	Safe	Winner
Princess MacDonald	Safe	—N/a	Safe	Safe	Safe	Safe	Safe	Safe	Safe	Safe	Runner-up
Faith Nakana	—N/a	Safe	Safe	Safe	Safe	Safe	Safe	Safe	Safe	3rd place	Eliminated
Nkosi Shange	—N/a	Safe	Safe	Safe	Safe	Safe	Safe	Safe	4th place	Eliminated	
Niikiey Kubheka	Safe	—N/a	Safe	Safe	Safe	Safe	Safe	5th place	Eliminated		
Envic Booysen	—N/a	Safe	Safe	Safe	Safe	Safe	6th place	Eliminated			
Thando Mdluli	—N/a	Safe	Safe	Safe	Safe	7th place	Eliminated				
Sena Mkhwanazi	Safe	—N/a	Safe	Safe	8th place	Eliminated					
Lungelo Motaung	Safe	—N/a	Safe	9th place	Eliminated						
Lungile Mthethwa	Safe	—N/a	10th place	Eliminated							
Sipho Manana	—N/a	11th place	Eliminated								
Neve Arnolds	12th place	Eliminated									
