= 22nd Annual South African Music Awards =

2016 award ceremony

22nd South African Music Awards
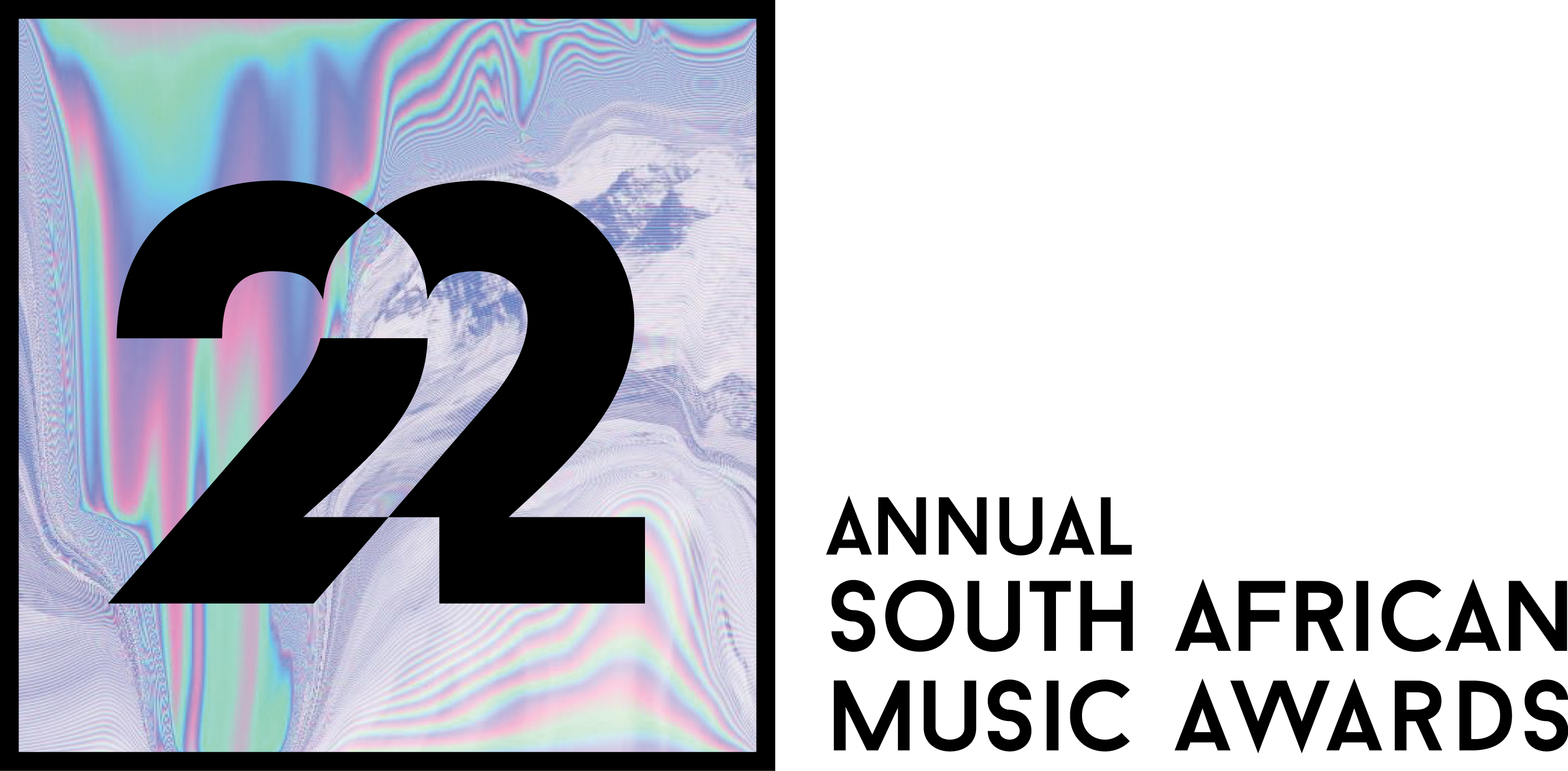
- Date: 4 June 2016
- Location: Inkosi Albert Luthuli International Convention Centre, Durban, South Africa
- Country: South Africa
- Hosted by: Somizi Mhlongo; Thando Thabethe
- Most awards: Nathi (6)
- Most nominations: Riky Rick (5)
- Website: http://samusicawards.co.za

The 22nd Annual South African Music Awards was held on 4 June 2016 at Inkosi Albert Luthuli International Convention Centre, Durban, South Africa and was hosted by Somizi Mhlongo and Thando Thabethe. The nominees were announced on 21 April 2016 with Nathi, Emtee, Zonke Dikana, and Riky Rick topping the list with four nominations each. Nathi garnered the most awards with five while Black Coffee came closest by claiming four awards.

== Performers ==
- Moneoa
- Loki Rothman
- Jabu Hlongwane
- Wouter Kellerman
- AKA
- Da L.E.S
- Nasty C
- Emtee
- Fifi Cooper
- Nathi
- DJ Ganyani
- DJ Merlon
- Revolution
- Prince Kaybee
- Dreamteam
- Big Nuz
- Thee Legacy song they performed
- Raheem Kemet
- Lakota Silva
- Nakhane Toure
- 24 Skies
- Thokozani Langa
- Khuzani
- Saarkies
- The Fraternity
- Andriette
- Pierre Rossouw
- iFANi
- DJ Fortee
- DJ Sliqe
- Mobi Dixon

== Winners and nominees ==
Below is the list of nominees and winners for the popular music categories. Winners are highlighted in bold.

| **Album of the Year**: **Pieces of Me** – **Black Coffee**; Francois van Coke – Francois Van Coke; Avery – Emtee; Buyelekhaya – Nathi; VII – Tresor | **Duo or Group of the Year**: **Big Nuz** – **For the Fans**; Desmond & The Tutus – Enjoy Yourself; Witness The Funk – Finding Nomusa; Marcus Wyatt & The ZAR Jaz Orchestra – One Night in the Sun; Junior Taurus & Lady Zamar – Cotton Candy |
| **Female Artist of the Year**: **Zonke** – **Work of Heart**; Zahara – Country Girl; Fifi Cooper – 20FIFI; Karen Zoid – Drown Out the Noise; Judith Sephuma – One Word | **Male Artist of the Year**: **Nathi** – **Buyelekhaya**; Black Coffee – Pieces of Me; Emtee – Avery; Francois Van Coke – Francois van Coke; Riky Rick – Family Values |
| **Newcomer of the Year**: **Buyelekhaya** – **Nathi**; Avery – Emtee; 20FIFI – Fifi Cooper; VII – Tresor; Family Values – Riky Rick | **Best Rock Album**: **Enjoy Yourself** – **Desmond & The Tutus**; Francois van Coke – Francois Van Coke; Drown Out the Noise – Karen Zoid; Youthless – Shortstraw; Reisiger – Saarkie |
| **Best Pop Album**: **VII** – **Tresor**; Overdrive – Can Skylark; Pop: The Mix Tape – Lakota Silva; The Way Back – Loki Rothman; Shaded Soul – Vincent Bones | **Best Pop Album (Afrikaans)**: **My Hartjie – Karlien van Jaarsveld**; Stop, Wag, Bly Nog ’n Bietjie – Brendan Peyper; In My Blood – Pierre Rossouw; Vuurbestand – Suzanne; Sit Vanaand op Herhaal – Vaughan Gardiner |
| **Best Adult Contemporary Album**: **One Word** – **Judith Sephuma**; Tigerlily – Josie Field & Laurie Levine; Salt – Kahn; Republiek van Zoid Afrika Vol. 2 – Karen Zoid and Friends; Watch the Rain – Watershed | **Beste Kontemporêre Musiek Album**: **Êrens in die Middel van Nêrens** – **Elvis Blue**; Pêrel vir ’n Kroon – Andriëtte; Sing Afrikaner Sing – Bok van Blerk; Hierde Hande – Neil Somers; Sonde – Stiaan Reynierse |
| **Best African Adult Album**: **Ubuntu – The Common String** – **Dizu Plaatjies**; Busisiwe – Tribute to the African Heroines – Jessica Mbangeni; Sekusile – Kabomo; Mudzimu Washu – L’wei Netshivhale; Soul Therapy – Thiwe | **Best Alternative Album**: **La Vie Est Belle/Life is Beautiful** – **Petite Noir**; Ja. Nee. Lekker (Deluxe) – Die Heuwels Fantasties; Rabulapha! – Moonchild Sanelly; Serpente Masjien – Sannie Fox; In Threes – The Plastics |
| **Best R&B / Soul / Reggae Album**: **Buyelekhaya** – **Nathi**; Country Girl – Zahara; Do What You Love – The Muffinz; Imbewu – Olwethu; Work of Heart – Zonke | **Best Rap Album**: **Avery** – **Emtee**; Family Values – Riky Rick; Impande – Zakwe; North God – Da L.E.S; 3 Quarter Pace – Kid X |
| **Best Kwaito Album**: **For The Fans** – **Big Nuz**; North Coast Vibe – Mzansi; Believe – Dbn Nyts; Immortal Vol. 3 – Kabelo Mabalane; Game Changer – DJ Bongz | **Best Dance Album**: **Pieces of Me** – **Black Coffee**; Home Sweet Home – Mi Casa; Original Copy – DJ Merlon; Cotton Candy – Junior Taurus & Lady Zamar; Tribal Soul Special Edition – Mobi Dixon |
| **Best Traditional Faith Album**: **The Journey Begins** – TYGC Family; True Worship 2015 – Worship House; Project 12 Praise Live – Worship House; Various Artists – Women in Praise; Ukhona Uthixo – Dumi Mkokstad | **Best Contemporary Faith Music Album**: **Spirit and Life** – **Ntokozo Mbambo**; To the Brave Ones – Mark Counihan; Redeemed to Worship – Mahalia Buchanan; Endless Anthem – 24 Skies; Santified in His Presence – Benjamin Dube |
| **Best Maskandi Album**: **Ichakijana** – **Imithente**; Gabi Gabi – Buselaphi; Bazali Bami – Shwi Nomtekhala; Khuzeka Mshana – Thokozani Langa; Woze Durban – Phuzekhemisi | **Best Jazz Album**: **One Night in the Sun (Jazz Orchestra)** – **Marcus Wyatt & the ZAR**; World Music – Bokani Dyer; Listening to the Ground – Nduduzo Makhathini; Homecoming – Benjamin Jephta Quintet; Bhekiwise – Amandla Freedom Ensemble |
| **Best Classical / Instrumental Album**: **Love Language** – **Wouter Kellerman**; Mintirho ya SJ KhosaOrchestra – KwaZulu-Natal Philharmonic Orchestra; Guy Buttery – Guy Buttery; Christoph & Sebastian – Cape Consort; Heartland – Deep South | **Best Live Audio Visual Recording**: **Live at Emperor's Palace** – **Jimmy Dludlu**; Santified in His Presence – Benjamin Dube; Spirit and Life – Ntokozo Mbambo; Krone 2 – Krone; Friends in Praise – Neyi & Omega |
| **Best Collaboration**: **"Shumaya & Trademark"** – **Dbn Nyts ft. Zinhle Ngidi**; "All Eyes on Me" – AKA ft. Redsan, Burna Boy & Stonebwoy; "No Lie" – Khuli Chana ft. Patoranking; "Back to the Beach" – Shekinah ft. Kyle Deutsch; "Sylza Tsotsi" – Major League DJz ft. Cassper Nyovest, Okmalumkoolkat, Riky Rick & Carpo | **Best Music Video of the Year**: **"Army of One"** – **Jack Parow & freshly Ground**; "Ayadelela" – iFani; "Fuseg" – Riky Rick ft. Cassper Nyovest & Anatii; "Caviar Dreams" – Al Bairre & PH Fat; "HUSH" – Monark |
| **Best Produced Album of the Year**: **Country Girl** – **Zahara**; To The Brave Ones – Mark Counihan; Home Sweet Home – Mi Casa; Work of Heart – Zonke; Serpente Masjien – Sannie Fox | **Best Engineered Album of the Year**: **Pieces of Me** – **Black Coffee**; Home Sweet Home – Mi Casa; Stop, Wag, Bly Nog ’n Bietjie – Brendan Peyper; Work of Heart – Zonke; One Night in the Sun – Marcus Wyatt & the ZAR Jazz Orchestra |
**Best Remix of the Year**: **"Do Like I Do (Remix)"** – **DJ Sliqe**; "Baddest Remix" – AKA; "Bheka Mina Ngedwa Amplified" – The Fraternity; "My Sugar" – Mobi Dixon; "Never Let Me Go (Remix)" – Mobi Dixon

=== Special awards ===
Amstel Record of the Year (Public Vote)

- "Roll Up" – Emtee
- "All Eyes on Me" - AKA featuring Burna Boy, Da Les and JR
- "Baddest" - AKA featuring Burna Boy, Khuli Chana and Yanga
- "Better Days" - Prince Kaybee featuring Audrey
- "Boss Zonke" - Riky Rick
- "Call Out" - DJ Fisherman & NaakMusiQ featuring DJ Tira, DreamTeam, Danger and DJ SK
- "J'adore" - Four7 featuring Tiffany
- "Koze Kuse" - DJ Merlon featuring Mondli Ngcobo
- "Nomvula" - Nathi
- "Save Me" - TiMO ODV featuring Sarah Jackson
- "Skhanda Love" - K.O featuring Nandi Mngoma
- "Way Up" - DJ Dimplez featuring Cassper Nyovest and JR
- "We Dance Again" - Black Coffee featuring Nakhane Touré

International Achievement Award

- Black Coffee

Lifetime Achievement Awards

- Nana Coyote (posthumous award)
- Roger Lucey
- Bhekumuzi Luthuli (posthumous award)

=== Sales and Downloads Awards ===
Best Selling Album

- Buyelekhaya – Nathi

Best Selling DVD

- Volume 19: Back to the Cross – Joyous Celebration

Best Overall Music Download

- "Bayede Baba" – Sfiso Ncwane

Best Selling Ring-Back Tone

- "Bayede Baba" – Sfiso Ncwane

Best Selling Full-Track Download

- "Nomvula" – Nathi

=== Sponsored Awards ===
Highest Radio Airplay of the Year (SAMPRA)

- "Shumaya" – DBN Nyts

Highest Radio Airplay Composers’ Award (SAMRO)

- "Shumaya" by Dbn Nyts – Samkele Maphumulo, Kabelo Masekane, Cebo Ngcobo, Wanda Shabalala and Lwazi Yokwana

Best Selling Digital Download Composers’ Award (CAPASSO)

- "Bayede Baba" – Sfiso Ncwane
