= Just Go =

Just Go may refer to:

- Just Go (album), an album by Lionel Richie, 2009
  - "Just Go" (Lionel Richie song), the title song
- Just Go (Goodbye's the New Hello), the debut studio album by Rania, 2013
- "Just Go" (JHETT song), 2005
- "Just Go" (Jiva song), Azerbaijan's entry for Eurovision 2026
- "Just Go" (Staind song), 1999
- "Just Go", a song by Jesse McCartney from Right Where You Want Me, 2006
