= MTV Africa Music Awards 2016 =

Award

- Date: 22 October 2016
- Location: Ticketpro Dome, Johannesburg, South Africa
- Hosted by: Bonang Matheba; Yemi Alade; Nomzamo Mbatha

Highlights
- Most awards: Wizkid (3)

Television/radio coverage
- Network: MTV, MTV Base, BET, e.tv

The 2016 MTV Africa Music Awards were held on October 22, 2016, at Ticketpro Dome in Johannesburg, South Africa. It recognised and rewarded musicians and achievers who made an impact on African music and youth culture during the eligibility period. The awards ceremony aired live on MTV Base, MTV and BET. It was transmitted worldwide on partner stations and content platforms, including BET International. The show was hosted by Nomzamo Mbatha, Yemi Alade and Bonang Matheba. It featured performances from Future, Yemi Alade, Nasty C, Babes Wodumo, Cassper Nyovest and Patoranking, among others.

The ceremony was sponsored by Joburg Tourism, in partnership and association with Absolut, Google, MTN and DStv. It celebrated African talent across 18 award categories, including Best Male, Best Female, Best Song and Best Collaboration. The contribution of artists from Portuguese and French-speaking countries were also recognised in the Best Lusophone and Best Francophone categories. Additional categories included the Africa Re-Imagined Award and Personality of the Year. The nominees were revealed on 21 September in Johannesburg and on 2 October in Lagos.

== Winners and nominees ==
=== Artist of the Year ===
Wizkid

- Black Coffee
- Yemi Alade
- Sauti Sol
- Diamond Platnumz

=== Song of the Year ===
Patoranking (featuring Wande Coal) - "My Woman, My Everything"

- Sauti Sol (featuring Ali Kiba) - "Unconditionally Love"
- DJ Maphorisa (featuring Wizkid and DJ Bucks) - "Soweto Baby"
- Babes Wodumo (featuring Mampintsha) - "Wololo"
- Harrysong (featuring Olamide, Kcee, Iyanya and Orezi) - "Reggae Blues"
- Korede Bello - "Godwin"
- Franko - "Coller La Petite"
- Kwesta (featuring Cassper Nyovest) - "Ngud'"
- AKA (featuring Burna Boy, Yanga and Khuli Chana) - "Baddest"

=== Best Male Act ===
Wizkid

- Black Coffee
- Patoranking
- AKA
- Diamond Platnumz

=== Best Female Act ===
Yemi Alade

- Josey Priscelle
- MzVee
- Tiwa Savage
- Vanessa Mdee

=== Best Group ===
Sauti Sol

- Toofan
- R2Bees
- Navy Kenzo
- Mi Casa

=== Breakthrough Act ===
Tekno

- Ycee
- Falz
- Nasty C
- Simi
- Franko
- Raymond
- Emtee
- Nathi

=== Best Collaboration ===
Wizkid (featuring DJ Maphorisa) and DJ Bucks) - "Soweto Baby"

- Sauti Sol (featuring Ali Kiba) - "Unconditionally Love"
- AKA (featuring Burna Boy, Yanga and Khuli Chana) - "Baddest"
- Patoranking (featuring Sarkodie) - "No Kissing Baby"

=== Best Live Act ===
Cassper Nyovest

- Stonebwoy
- Flavour N'abania
- Mafikizolo
- Eddy Kenzo

=== Video Of The Year ===
Youssoupha - "Niquer ma vie"

- P.H. Fat (featuring Al Bairre) - "Xavier Dreams"
- Anatii (featuring Nasty C and Cassper Nyovest) - "Jump"
- Sheebah Karungi - "Kisasi Kimu"
- Tiwa Savage (featuring Dr SID) - "If I Start to Talk"

=== Best Hip-Hop ===
Emtee

- Riky Rick
- Ycee
- Olamide
- Kiff No Beat

=== Best Pop & Alternative ===
Kylie Deutsch

- Shekinah
- Desmond and the Tutus
- Locnville
- TiMO ODV
- Tresor

=== Best Francophone ===
Serge Beynaud

- J-Rio
- Toofan
- Franko
- Magasco

=== Best Lusophone ===
C4 Pedro

- Preto Show
- Nga
- Lizha James
- Nelson Freitas

=== Listener's Choice ===
Jah Prayzah (Zimbabwe)

- Adiouza (Senegal)
- Burna Boy (Nigeria)
- Bebe Cool (Uganda)
- DenG (Liberia)
- EL (Ghana)
- Jay Rox (Zambia)
- Kansoul (Kenya)
- Kiss Daniel (Nigeria)
- Lij Michael (Ethiopia)
- L.X.G (Sierra Leone)
- Meddy (Rwanda)
- Messias Marioca (Mozambique)
- Prince Kaybee (South Africa)
- Reda Taliani (Algeria)
- Saad Lamjarred (Morocco)
- Sabri Mosbah (Tunisia)
- Sidiki Diabate (Mali)
- Tamer Hosny (Egypt)
- The Dogg (Namibia)
- Yamoto Band (Tanzania)

=== Personality Of The Year ===
Caster Semenya

- Linda Ikeji
- Pearl Thusi
- Wizkid
- Pierre-Emerick Aubameyang

=== Best International Act ===
Drake

- Rihanna
- Beyoncé
- Future
- Adele

=== Legend Award ===
Hugh Masekela
