= Idols South Africa season 14 =

Idols South Africa
- Season 14
- Hosted by: ProVerb
- Winner: Yanga Sobetwa
- Runner-up: Thato Makape

Release
- Original network: Mzansi Magic
- Original release: July 8 – November 18, 2018

Season chronology
- Next → Season 15

The fourteenth season of South African Idols premiered on July 8, 2018, on the Mzansi Magic television network. ProVerb continued his role as the show's host and an executive producer while Somizi Mhlongo, Unathi Nkayi and Randall Abrahams also remained as the main judges, with guest judges at each audition city.

== Auditions ==
Auditions began in January and ended in March.

Audition dates and venues
City	Venue	Guest Judge	Date
Durban	North Beach Amphitheatre		20 January 2018
Cape Town	Century City Conference Centre	DJ Cleo	27 January 2018
Pretoria	The State Theatre		10 February 2018
Johannesburg	Carnival City		24 February 2018

Pop-up audition dates and venues
City	Venue	Date
Bloemfontein	Mimosa Mall	3 February 2018
Port Elizabeth	Boardwalk Casino & Hotel	17 February 2018
Polokwane	Savannah Mall	3 March 2018

== Finalists ==
Contestant	Age	Hometown	Place finished
Yanga Sobetwa	16	Delft, Cape Town	Winner
Thato Makape	23	Postmasburg, Northern Cape	Runner-up
Thando Mngomezulu	19	Alberton, Gauteng	3rd
Basimane Melato (King B)	20	Kagiso	4th
Niyaaz Arendse	22	Cape Town	5th
Nosipho Silinda	17	Ladysmith, KwaZulu-Natal	6th
Zamagambu Memela (Xae)	19	Pinetown, Durban	7th
Lincoln Lewis	22	Ravensmead, Cape Flats	8th
Ntokozo Makhathini	18	Witbank, Emalahleni	9th
Mthokozisi Ngcobo	20	Umlazi, Durban	10th
Bongiwe Mdaka	23	Melelani, Mpumalanga	11th/13th
Dalene Swartz	21	Eldorado Park, Johannesburg	11th/13th
Lethabo Ramatsui (Wattahmelon)	18	Atteridgeville, Pretoria	11th/13th
Mnqobi Dlamini	21	Piet Retief	14th/16th
Sandile Skosana	26	Tsakane, Ekurhuleni	14th/16th
Victor Matalane	25	Riba Cross, Limpopo	14th/16th

== Weekly Song Choice and Result ==
=== Top 16 ===
==== Boys (2 September) ====
Act	Order	Song	Result
Victor Matalane	1	"Nguwe" by Vusi Nova	Eliminated
Mthokozisi Ngcobo	2	"So Amazing" by Luther Vandross	Safe
Mnqobi Dlamini	3	"Hold On, We're Going Home" by Drake	Eliminated
Sandile Skosana	4	"Nomvula" by Nathi	Eliminated
Lincoln Lewis	5	"Writing's On The Wall" by Sam Smith	Safe
Thato Makape	6	"With You" by Chris Brown	Safe
King B	7	"Stay With Me" by Sam Smith	Safe
Niyaaz Arendse	8	"Mirrors" by Justin Timberlake	Wild Card

==== Girls (9 September) ====
Act	Order	Song	Result
Thando Mngomezulu	1	"Giving Myself" by Jennifer Hudson	Wild Card
Bongiwe Mdaka	2	"Beneath Your Beautiful" by Emeli Sandé	Eliminated
Wattahmelon	3	"Lose to Win" by Fantasia	Eliminated
Nosipho Silinda	4	"Alive" by Sia	Safe
Xae	5	"Broken Clocks" by SZA	Safe
Yanga Sobetwa	6	"Don't You Remember" by Adele	Safe
Ntokozo Makhathini	7	"Ndiza" by Zahara	Safe
Dalene Swartz	8	"It's Not Right, But It's Okay by Whitney Houston	Eliminated

=== Top 10 (16 September) ===
Act	Order	Song	Result
Nosipho Silinda	1	"Collide" by Lady Zamar	Safe
Mthokozisi Ngcobo	2	"Ascension (Don't Ever Wonder)" by Maxwell	Eliminated
Lincoln Lewis	3	"Sondela" by Ringo Madlingozi	Safe
Xae	4	"Please Mr" by Shekhinah	Safe
Niyaaz Arendse	5	"Perfect" by Ed Sheeran	Safe
Ntokozo Makhathini	6	"Fill Me Up" by Tasha Cobbs	Safe
Thato Makape	7	"I Got You" by Encore	Safe
Thando Mngomezulu	8	"(You Make Me Feel Like) A Natural Woman" by Aretha Franklin	Safe
King B	9	"Love On The Brain" by Rihanna	Safe
Yanga Sobetwa	10	"Amazulu" by Amanda Black	Safe

=== Top 9: The 90s (23 September) ===
Act	Order	Song	Result
Lincoln Lewis	1	"Pony" by Ginuwine	Safe
Xae	2	"That's The Way Love Goes" by Janet Jackson	Safe
Niyaaz Arendse	3	"Forever" by Damage	Safe
Yanga Sobetwa	4	"Before You Walk Out My Life" by Monica Brown	Safe
Thato Makape	5	"If I Ever Fall In Love" by Shai	Safe
Thando Mngomezulu	6	"Bills, Bills, Bills" by Destiny's Child	Safe
Nosipho Silinda	7	"Open Arms" by Tina Turner	Safe
Ntokozo Makhathini	8	"He Wasn't Man Enough" by Toni Braxton	Eliminated
King B	9	"Remember The Time" by Michael Jackson	Safe

=== Top 8 - Orchestral Delight (30 September) ===
Act	Order	Song	Result
Niyaaz Arendse	1	"Take Me To Church" by Hozier	Safe
Xae	2	"Cranes In The Sky" by Solange Knowles	Safe
King B	3	"Loliwe" by Zahara	Safe
Nosipho Silinda	4	"Hurt" by Christina Aguilera	Safe
Lincoln Lewis	5	"Elastic Heart" by Sia	Eliminated
Yanga Sobetwa	6	"Try Sleeping With A Broken Heart" by Alicia Keys	Safe
Thato Makape	7	"Treat You Better" by Shawn Mendes	Safe
Thando Mngomezulu	8	"As Long As You Love Me" by Justin Bieber	Safe

=== Top 7: Showstopper (7 October) ===
Act	Order	Song	Result
Thato Makape	1	"Mamelani" by Naakmusiq	Safe
Nosipho Silinda	2	"Into You" by Ariana Grande	Safe
Niyaaz Arendse	3	"Turn Up The Music" by Chris Brown	Safe
Yanga Sobetwa	4	"Not Yet Uhuru" by Letta Mbulu	Safe
Xae	5	"One Thing" by Amerie	Eliminated
King B	6	"Inde" by Heavy K & Busiswa	Safe
Thando Mngomezulu	7	"Single Ladies" by Beyoncé	Safe

=== Top 6: Celebration of South African Music (14 October) ===
Act	Order	Celebration of SA Music	Order	Love Songs	Result
Thato Makape	1	"Tell Me" by Stimela & Ray Phiri	7	"U Got It Bad" by Usher	Safe
Nosipho Silinda	2	"Destiny" by Zahara	8	"Halo" by Beyonce	Eliminated
Niyaaz Arendse	3	"Jika" by Mi Casa	9	"Crazy Love" by Brian McKnight	Safe
Thando Mngomezulu	4	"Nizalwa Ngobani" by Thandiswa Mazwai	10	"I Believe In You & Me" by Whitney Houston	Safe
King B	5	"Baby Please" by Kelly Khumalo	11	"Make You Feel My Love" by Adele	Safe
Yanga Sobetwa	6	"Xa Bendino Mama" by Zahara	12	"If This Isn't Love" by Jennifer Hudson	Safe

=== Top 5 (21 October) ===
Act	Order	Song	Order	Song	Result
Thando Mngomezulu	1	"Spotlight" by Jennifer Hudson	6	"The Weakness In Me"" by Keisha White	Safe
Niyaaz Arendse	2	"Too Good At Goodbyes" by Sam Smith	7	"Lost Without U" by Robin Thicke	Eliminated
King B	3	"Irreplaceable" by Beyoncé	8	"Say Something" by Laura D	Safe
Yanga Sobetwa	4	"What Is Love" by V. Bozeman	9	"I Will Always Love You" by Whitney Houston	Safe
Thato Makape	5	"Imibuzo" by Nathi	10	"Inkomo" by The Soil	Safe

=== Top 4 (28 October) ===
Act	Order	Song - Soweto Gospel Choir	Order	Song	Result
Thato Makape	1	"Many Rivers to Cross" by Soweto Gospel Choir	6	"If" by Davido	Safe
Thando Mngomezulu	2	"Ka Na Le Modisa" by Soweto Gospel Choir	7	"Thando" by Naima Kay	Safe
Yanga Sobetwa	3	"Avulekile Amasango/One Love" by Soweto Gospel Choir	8	"Impilo" by Sjava	Safe
King B	1	"Lion of Judah" by Soweto Gospel Choir	5	"Kahle" by Amanda Black	Eliminated

=== Top 3: Semi-Final (4 November) ===
Act	Order	Duet	Order	Song	Result
Yanga Sobetwa	1	"Beauty and the Beast" by Ariana Grande & John Legend (with Khaya Mthethwa)	4	"Mkulumsebenzi" by Khaya Mthethwa	Safe
Thando Mngomezulu	2	"The Closer I Get To You" by Beyoncé & Luther Vandross (with Karabo Mogane)	5	"Never Say Never" by Justin Bieber	Eliminated
Thato Makape	3	"Ngamthanda Umuntu" by Linda (with Amanda Black)	6	"Thandiwe" by Vusi Nova	Safe

- Before the Top 3 were announced, King B also got to duet with Mmatema Moremi they performed Smother by Craig Lucas & Paxton

=== Top 2: Final (11 November) ===
Act	Order	Idols Produced Single	Order	Favourite Previous Performance	Order	Best Performance	Result
Yanga Sobetwa	1	"Scars (All Over Me)" by Yanga	3	"Heaven" by Emeli Sandé	5	"Try Sleeping with a Broken Heart" by Alicia Keys	Winner
Thato Makape	2	"Blow by Blow" by Thato	4	"I'm Not the Only One" by Sam Smith	3	"If" by Davido	Runner-up

- Before her elimination Thando performed her debut single "Wasting Time".

== Elimination Chart ==
Colour key

–	Winner
–	Runner-up
–	Wild Card
–	Eliminated

Weekly results per act
Act	Top 16		Top 10	Top 9	Top 8	Top 7	Top 6	Top 5	Top 4	Top 3	Top 2
Act	Boys	Girls	Top 10	Top 9	Top 8	Top 7	Top 6	Top 5	Top 4	Top 3	Top 2
Yanga Sobetwa	—N/a	Safe	Safe	Safe	Safe	Safe	Safe	Safe	Safe	Safe	Winner
Thato Makape	Safe	—N/a	Safe	Safe	Safe	Safe	Safe	Safe	Safe	Safe	Runner-up
Thando Mngomezulu	—N/a	Wild Card	Safe	Safe	Safe	Safe	Safe	Safe	Safe	3rd place	Eliminated
King B	Safe	—N/a	Safe	Safe	Safe	Safe	Safe	Safe	4th place	Eliminated	
Niyaaz Arendse	Wild Card	—N/a	Safe	Safe	Safe	Safe	Safe	5th place	Eliminated		
Nosipho Silinda	—N/a	Safe	Safe	Safe	Safe	Safe	6th place	Eliminated			
Xae	—N/a	Safe	Safe	Safe	Safe	7th place	Eliminated				
Lincoln Lewis	Safe	—N/a	Safe	Safe	8th place	Eliminated					
Ntokozo Makhathini	—N/a	Safe	Safe	9th place	Eliminated						
Mthokozisi Ngcobo	Safe	—N/a	10th place	Eliminated							
Bongiwe Mdaka	—N/a	11th-16th place	Eliminated								
Dalene Swartz	—N/a	11th-16th place	Eliminated								
Wattahmelon	—N/a	11th-16th place	Eliminated								
Mnqobi Dlamini	11th-16th place	Eliminated									
Sandile Skosana	11th-16th place	Eliminated									
Victor Matalane	11th-16th place	Eliminated									
