= Idols South Africa season 18 =

Idols South Africa
- Season 18
- Hosted by: ProVerb
- Judges: Somizi Mhlongo; Thembi Seete; JR
- Winner: Thapelo Molomo
- Runner-up: Nozi Sibiya

Release
- Original network: Mzansi Magic
- Original release: 17 July – 13 November 2022

Season chronology
- ← Previous; Season 17 Next → Season 19

The eighteenth season of South African Idols premiered on 17 July 2022 on the Mzansi Magic television network under the theme "Singing a Different Tune". Over 9,000 contestants auditioned for the season. The season was won by Thapelo Molomo and the runner-up was Nozi Sibiya.

Shortly after online auditions for the season were opened, it was announced that Randall Abrahams and Unathi Nkayi would not return to the show as judges. In February 2022, M-Net announced that Thembi Seete and JR replaced them, joining Somizi Mhlongo on the judges panel.

== Finalists ==
This season, instead of the usual Top 16, a Top 12 was announced on 21 August 2022.

| Contestant | Age | Hometown | Place finished |
|---|---|---|---|
| Thapelo Molomo | 29 | Mokopane, Limpopo | Winner |
| Nozi Sibiya | 27 | Umlazi, KwaZulu-Natal | Runner-up |
| Mpilwenhle Mokopu | 24 | Katlehong, Gauteng | 3rd |
| Ty Loner | 21 | Eldorado Park, Gauteng | 4th |
| Zee Arnolds | 18 | Cape Town, Western Cape | 5th |
| Noxolo Mthethwa | 25 | Inanda, KwaZulu-Natal | 6th |
| Kabelo Makhetha | 25 | Pietermaritzburg, KwaZulu-Natal | 7th |
| CeeJay Canvass | 24 | KwaDukuza, KwaZulu-Natal | 8th |
| Tesmin-Robyn Khanye | 23 | Katlehong, Gauteng | 9th |
| Lerato Matsabu | 27 | Vaal, Gauteng | 10th |
| Nandi Ndathane | 21 | Diepkloof, Gauteng | 11th |
| Hope Mkhway | 23 | Pietermaritzburg, KwaZulu-Natal | 12th |

== Weekly Song Choice and Results ==
=== Top 12: Duets with Mzansi Stars & Greatest Hits of Today ===
==== Group 1 (28 August) ====
| Act | Order | Song — Duets with Mzansi Stars | Order | Song — Greatest Hits of Today | Result |
|---|---|---|---|---|---|
| Zee | 1 | "Empini" with Kelly Khumalo | 7 | "Surprise" by Chlöe | Safe |
| Thapelo | 2 | "Langa Linye" with Mduduzi Ncube | 8 | "Love Me More" by Sam Smith | Safe |
| Hope | 3 | "Pretend" with Langa Mavuso | 9 | "Hrs and Hrs" by Muni Long | Eliminated |
| Mpilwenhle | 4 | "Phatha Kahle" with Presss | 10 | "Positions" by Ariana Grande | Safe |
| Kabelo | 5 | "Ngamkhetha" with Nomfundo Moh | 11 | "For Tonight" by Giveon | Safe |
| Tesmin-Robyn | 6 | "Pillowtalk" with Boohle | 12 | "Pressure by Ari Lennox | Safe |

==== Group 2 (4 September) ====
| Act | Order | Song — Duets with Mzansi Stars | Order | Song — Greatest Hits of Today | Result |
|---|---|---|---|---|---|
| Noxolo | 1 | "Kuyenyukela" with Kelly Khumalo | 7 | "Jerome" by Lizzo | Safe |
| Nandi | 2 | "Ngimnandi" with Boohle | 8 | "Enough" by Fantasia | Eliminated |
| CeeJay | 3 | "Isgingci" with Mduduzi Ncube | 9 | "Love Nwantiti" by CKay | Safe |
| Lerato | 4 | "Soft Life" with Nomfundo Moh | 10 | "Kiss Me More" by Doja Cat | Safe |
| Ty Loner | 5 | "Cry No More" with Presss | 11 | "Last Last" by Burna Boy | Safe |
| Nozi | 6 | "Mvula" with Langa Mavuso | 12 | "Break My Soul by Beyoncé | Safe |

=== Top 10: Spotify's Soulful Sundays (11 September) ===
| Act | Order | Song | Result |
|---|---|---|---|
| Mpilwenhle | 1 | "Kahle" by Amanda Black | Safe |
| Thapelo | 2 | "All By Myself" by Celine Dion | Safe |
| Tesmin-Robyn | 3 | "More Than You" by Moneoa | Safe |
| Zee | 4 | "Jik’izinto" by Zonke | Safe |
| Kabelo | 5 | "Her Heart" by Anthony Hamilton | Safe |
| Lerato | 6 | "I Can’t Make You Love Me" by Tank | Eliminated |
| Ty Loner | 7 | "Thando" by Lloyd Cele | Safe |
| Noxolo | 8 | "Masterpiece (Mona Lisa)" by Jazmine Sullivan | Safe |
| Nozi | 9 | "Giving Myself" by Jennifer Hudson | Safe |
| CeeJay | 10 | "Tonight (Best You Ever Had)" by John Legend | Safe |

=== Top 9: History of Music in Mzansi (18 September) ===
| Act | Order | Song | Result |
|---|---|---|---|
| Noxolo | 1 | "Shebeleza" by Joe Mafela | Safe |
| Kabelo | 2 | "Ekuseni" by Ringo Madlingozi | Safe |
| Mpilwenhle | 3 | "Nomalanga" by Caiphus Semenya | Safe |
| CeeJay | 4 | "Send Me (South Africa)" by Hugh Masekela | Safe |
| Tesmin-Robyn | 5 | "Siyaya Phambili" by Stimela | Eliminated |
| Ty Loner | 6 | "Scatterlings of Africa" by Juluka | Safe |
| Nozi | 7 | "Nizalwa Ngobani" by Thandiswa Mazwai | Safe |
| Thapelo | 8 | "Papa" by Sankomota | Safe |
| Zee | 9 | "Mama I’m Sorry" by Brenda Fassie | Safe |

=== Top 8: Parents' High School Crush (25 September) ===
| Act | Order | Song | Result |
|---|---|---|---|
| Nozi | 1 | "The First Time Ever I Saw Your Face" by Roberta Flack | Safe |
| CeeJay | 2 | "Mas’thokoze" by Mafikizolo | Eliminated |
| Zee | 3 | "(I Can’t Help) Falling in Love With You" by UB40 | Safe |
| Kabelo | 4 | "Here and Now" by Luther Vandross | Safe |
| Ty Loner | 5 | "Can You Stand The Rain" by New Edition | Safe |
| Thapelo | 6 | "Let It Be" by The Beatles | Safe |
| Mpilwenhle | 7 | "Hero" by Mariah Carey | Safe |
| Noxolo | 8 | "Miss You Like Crazy" by Natalie Cole | Safe |

=== Top 7: Showstopper (2 October) ===
| Act | Order | Song | Result |
|---|---|---|---|
| Kabelo | 1 | "Yeah!" by Usher feat. Lil Jon & Ludacris | Eliminated |
| Noxolo | 2 | "I Wanna Dance with Somebody (Who Loves Me)" by Whitney Houston | Safe |
| Mpilwenhle | 3 | "Run the World (Girls)" by Beyoncé | Safe |
| Thapelo | 4 | "Di Boya Limpopo" by Master KG feat. Zanda Zakhuza & Makhadzi | Safe |
| Zee | 5 | "Grown Woman" by Beyoncé | Safe |
| Ty Loner | 6 | "Locked Out of Heaven" by Bruno Mars | Safe |
| Nozi | 7 | "Don't Stop the Music" by Rihanna | Safe |

=== Top 6: Lifesong & Joyous Celebration (9 October) ===
| Act | Order | Song — Lifesong | Order | Song — Joyous Celebration | Result |
|---|---|---|---|---|---|
| Zee | 1 | "Hurt" by Christina Aguilera | 7 | "Uzuliphathe Kahle" with Joyous Celebration | Safe |
| Noxolo | 2 | "We Were Here" by Simmy | 8 | "My Help" with Joyous Celebration | Eliminated |
| Ty Loner | 3 | "Rock with You" by Michael Jackson | 9 | "Who Am I?" with Joyous Celebration | Safe |
| Nozi | 4 | "One Night Only" by Jennifer Holliday | 10 | "Wenzile" with Joyous Celebration | Safe |
| Mpilwenhle | 5 | "Man in the Mirror" by Michael Jackson | 11 | "Ndenzel’ Uncedo" with Joyous Celebration | Safe |
| Thapelo | 6 | "I Look to You" by "Whitney Houston" | 12 | "Hallelujah Nkateko" with Joyous Celebration | Safe |

=== Top 5: The Babyface Songbook & Local Chart Toppers (16 October) ===
| Act | Order | Song — Babyface | Order | Song — Local Chart Toppers | Result |
|---|---|---|---|---|---|
| Zee | 1 | "Breathe Again" by Toni Braxton | 6 | "Abalele" by Kabza de Small & DJ Maphorisa feat. Ami Faku | Eliminated |
| Ty Loner | 2 | "The Color of Love" by Boyz II Men | 7 | "Mgani" by A-Reece | Safe |
| Thapelo | 3 | "End of the Road" by Boyz II Men | 8 | "Sponky Ponky" by Jabu Khanyile | Safe |
| Nozi | 4 | "Never Gonna Let You Go" by Faith Evans | 9 | "Asibe Happy" by Kabza de Small & DJ Maphorisa feat. Ami Faku | Safe |
| Mpilwenhle | 5 | "Another Sad Love Song" by Toni Braxton | 10 | "Dali Nguwe" by Master KG & Wanitwa Mos feat. Nkosazana Daughter | Safe |

=== Top 4: New School Mzansi Hits & How It Should Have Been Done (23 October) ===
| Act | Order | Song — New School Mzansi Hits | Order | Song — How It Should Have Been Done | Result |
|---|---|---|---|---|---|
| Mpilwenhle | 1 | "Khusela" by Kabza de Small feat. Msaki | 5 | "Jealous" by Labrinth | Safe |
| Ty Loner | 2 | "Selema (Po Po)" by Musa Keys & Loui | 6 | "You & I (Nobody in the World)" by John Legend | Eliminated |
| Thapelo | 3 | "Seasons" by Lloyiso | 7 | "Ndikuthandile" by Vusi Nova | Safe |
| Nozi | 4 | "Thando" by Mvzzle feat. Zammy | 8 | "Listen" by Beyoncé | Safe |

=== Top 3: My Audition Song, Divas and Divos & Judges' Choice (30 October) ===
| Act | Order | Song — My Audition Song | Order | Song — Divas and Divos | Order | Song — Judges' Choice | Result |
|---|---|---|---|---|---|---|---|
| Nozi | 1 | "Best Part" by Daniel Caesar feat. H.E.R. | 4 | "Try a Little Tenderness" by Aretha Franklin | 7 | "Rise Up" by Andra Day | Safe |
| Mpilwenhle | 2 | "Ke Mo Afrika" by Maleh | 5 | "Angel of Mine" by Monica | 8 | "A Long Walk" by Jill Scott | Eliminated |
| Thapelo | 3 | "Esphambanweni" by Kelly Khumalo | 6 | "When a Man Loves a Woman" by Michael Bolton | 9 | "So Amazing" by Luther Vandross | Safe |

=== Top 2 (6 November) ===
| Act | Order | Song — Idols-produced Single | Order | Song — Viewers' Choice | Order | Song — Song of the Season | Result |
|---|---|---|---|---|---|---|---|
| Thapelo | 1 | "Phanda" by Thapelo Molomo | 3 | "Thanayi" by Hugh Masekela | 5 | "Let It Be" by The Beatles | Winner |
| Nozi | 2 | "Idliso" by Nozi Sibiya | 4 | "Moments Away" by Mango Groove | 6 | "Giving Myself" by Jennifer Hudson | Runner-up |

- Before her elimination, Mpilwenhle Mokopu performed her single "Ngiyazifela".

== Elimination Chart ==
Colour key

| – | Winner |
| – | Runner-up |
| – | Eliminated |
| – | Wild Card |
| – | Withdrew |

Weekly results per act
| Act | Top 12 | | Top 10 | Top 9 | Top 8 | Top 7 | Top 6 | Top 5 | Top 4 | Top 3 | Top 2: Finale |
| Act | Group 1 | Group 2 | Top 10 | Top 9 | Top 8 | Top 7 | Top 6 | Top 5 | Top 4 | Top 3 | Top 2: Finale |
|---|---|---|---|---|---|---|---|---|---|---|---|
| Thapelo Molomo | Safe | —N/a | Safe | Safe | Safe | Safe | Safe | Safe | Safe | Safe | Winner |
| Nozi Sibiya | —N/a | Safe | Safe | Safe | Safe | Safe | Safe | Safe | Safe | Safe | Runner-up |
| Mpilwenhle Mokopu | Safe | —N/a | Safe | Safe | Safe | Safe | Safe | Safe | Safe | 3rd place | Eliminated |
| Ty Loner | —N/a | Safe | Safe | Safe | Safe | Safe | Safe | Safe | 4th place | Eliminated | |
| Zee Arnolds | Safe | —N/a | Safe | Safe | Safe | Safe | Safe | 5th place | Eliminated | | |
| Noxolo Mthethwa | —N/a | Safe | Safe | Safe | Safe | Safe | 6th place | Eliminated | | | |
| Kabelo Makhetha | Safe | —N/a | Safe | Safe | Safe | 7th place | Eliminated | | | | |
| CeeJay Canvass | —N/a | Safe | Safe | Safe | 8th place | Eliminated | | | | | |
| Tesmin-Robyn Khanye | Safe | —N/a | Safe | 9th place | Eliminated | | | | | | |
| Lerato Matsabu | —N/a | Safe | 10th place | Eliminated | | | | | | | |
| Nandi Ndathane | —N/a | 11th place | Eliminated | | | | | | | | |
| Hope Mkhway | 12th place | Eliminated | | | | | | | | | |
