= Idols South Africa season 15 =

Idols South Africa
- Season 15
- Hosted by: ProVerb
- Judges: Somizi Mhlongo; Randall Abrahams; Unathi Nkayi
- Winner: Luyolo Yiba
- Runner-up: Sneziey Msomi

Release
- Original network: Mzansi Magic
- Original release: 7 July – 17 November 2019

Season chronology
- ← Previous; Season 14 Next → Season 16

The fifteenth season of South African Idols premiered on 7 July 2019, 17:30 SAST and concluded on 17 November 2019 on the Mzansi Magic TV. The season was won by Luyolo Yiba and the runner-up was Sneziey Msomi.

ProVerb remained as the show's host and an executive producer, while Somizi Mhlongo, Unathi Nkayi and Randall Abrahams also remained as the main judges, with guest judges at each of the four audition cities. The next season was showcasing on 2 August 2020.

== Preliminary auditions ==
City	Venue	Guest Judge	Date
Pretoria	State Theatre	Rebecca Malope	26 January 2019
Durban	North Beach Amphitheatre	Vusi Nova	9 February 2019
Cape Town	Century City Conference Centre	Dj Fresh	2 March 2019
Johannesburg	Ellis Park Arena	Lady Zamar	16 February 2019

Pop-up Auditions
City	Venue	Date
Bloemfontein	PACOFS - Performing Arts Centre of the Free State	2 February 2019
Polokwane	Meropa Casino & Entertainment World	23 February 2019
Port Elizabeth	Dolphins Leap Conference & Events Centre	23 February 2019

A total of 86 golden tickets were issued at all four stops including pop-up stops this season. Season 15 came with many surprises defying the history of the show, rules changed a bit during theatre week, back up singers were provided, with no backing required from the contestants, each contestant had to out-perform the other, and for the first time, 17 contestants were selected for the next round instead of the traditional 16 to accommodate twins Viggy and Virginia Qwabe.

== Finalists ==
Contestant	Age	Hometown	Place finished
Luyolo Yiba	25	Qonce	Winner
Sneziey Msomi	25	Umlazi	Runner-up
Micayla Oelofse	18	Port Elizabeth	3rd
Nolo Seodisha	26	Soshanguve	4th
Viggy Qwabe	22	Stanger	Withdrew
Virginia Qwabe	22	Stanger	6th
Mmangaliso Gumbi	24	Ladysmith, KwaZulu-Natal	7th
Nqobile Gumede	21	KwaMashu	8th
Dinky Swartz	22	Ennerdale, Gauteng	9th
Innocentia Sibi	30	Khuma, Stilfontein	10th
Craig Jordan	21	Elsie's River	11th/13th
Treasure Mngadi	23	KwaMashu	11th/13th
Zia Fielies	19	Mannenberg, Cape Town	11th/13th
Andy Keys	20	Embalenhle, Secunda	14th/17th
Louise Nicholls	29	Strandfontein, Matzikama	14th/17th
Sizwe Hlatshwayo	27	Emalahleni	14th/17th
Xola Toto	21	Cape Town	14th/17th

== Weekly Song Choice and Result ==
=== Top 17 ===
The judges' job was now over and it was now up to the public to vote for their favourite contestant to advance to the next level of the competition, two methods were introduced to the public, every contestant was allocated a unique voting number. Contestants could be voted either by SMS, the voting number remained the same as other seasons 37400, or voting could be done for free on www.idolssa.tv.

==== Group A Theme: Songs that Trended (25 August) ====
Act	Order	Song	Result
Sizwe Hlatshwayo	1	"Tigi" by Sands	Eliminated
Dinky Swartz	2	"Get You" by Daniel Caesar	Safe
Mmangaliso Gumbi	3	"Egoli" by Mlindo the Vocalist	Safe
Louise Nicholls	4	"Without Me" by Halsey	Eliminated
Andy Keys	5	"Girls Like You" by Maroon 5	Eliminated
Virginia Qwabe	6	"Themba" by Kelly Khumalo	Safe
Viggy Qwabe	7	"Mgodi" by Zahara	Safe
Nolo Seodisha	8	"Talk" by Khalid	Safe
Xola Toto	9	"Come With Me" by Black Coffee	Eliminated

==== Group B Theme: Songs that Trended (1 September) ====
Act	Order	Song	Result
Sneziey Msomi	1	"Ewe Getsemane" by Sbu Noah	Safe
Nqobile Gumede	2	"Love Theory" by Kirk Franklin	Safe
Luyolo Yiba	3	"Say You Won't Let Go" by James Arthur	Safe
Zia Fielies	4	"Better" by Khalid	Eliminated
Treasure Mngadi	5	"The Middle" by Zedd feat. Maren Morris & Grey	Eliminated
Craig Jordan	6	"Dancing with a Stranger" by Sam Smith feat. Normani	Eliminated
Micayla Oelofse	7	"New Rules" by Dua Lipa	Safe
Innocentia Sibi	8	"Scars to Your Beautiful" by Alessia Cara	Wild Card

=== Top 10: Inspirational Hits (15 September) ===
Act	Order	Song	Result
Dinky Swartz	1	"One Wing" by Jordin Sparks	Safe
Viggy Qwabe	2	"Phumelela" by Miss Pru feat. Amanda Black	Safe
Luyolo Yiba	3	"Set Fire to the Rain" by Adele	Safe
Nqobile Gumede	4	"Can't Give Up Now" by Mary Mary	Safe
Sneziey Msomi	5	"Heal My Soul" by Tshwane Gospel Choir	Safe
Virginia Qwabe	6	"Yebo Linamandla" by Benjamin Dube	Safe
Nolo Seodisha	7	"Modimo Ke Lerato" by Joyous Celebration	Safe
Innocentia Sibi	8	"Ave Marie" by Beyoncé	Eliminated
Mmangaliso Gumbi	9	"Ngangingazi " by Benjamin Dube	Safe
Micayla Oelofse	10	"Rise Up" by Andra Day	Safe

=== Top 9 (22 September) ===
Act	Order	Song	Result
Virginia Qwabe	1	"Umsindo" by Durban	Safe
Sneziey Msomi	2	"Pakisha" by Dladla Mshunqisi	Safe
Dinky Swartz	3	"No Rush (Remix)" by DJ Tira feat. Prince Bulo	Eliminated
Micayla Oelofse	4	"Best Part" by Daniel Caesar feat. H.E.R.	Safe
Nqobile Gumede	5	"Malokazi" by Mduduzi	Safe
Nolo Seodisha	6	"Jika" by AKA	Safe
Mmangaliso Gumbi	7	"A Couple of Forevers" by Chrisette Michele	Safe
Viggy Qwabe	8	"Amaxoki" by Distruction Boyz	Safe
Luyolo Yiba	9	"Abangani" by Sjava	Safe

=== Top 8 (29 September) ===
Act	Order	Song	Result
Sneziey Msomi	1	"Burnout" by Sipho Hostix	Safe
Viggy Qwabe	2	"Chandelier" by Sia	Safe
Luyolo Yiba	3	"Green Light" by John Legend	Safe
Nqobile Gumede	4	"I'm Every Woman" by Chaka Khan	Safe
Nolo Seodisha	5	"Mkhaya Lo" by Jabu Khanyile	Safe
Virginia Qwabe	6	"Titanium" by David Guetta feat. Sia	Safe
Micayla Oelofse	7	"Angifuni" by Paxton	Safe
Mmangaliso Gumbi	8	"Lady Marmalade" by Labelle	Safe

=== Top 7 (6 October) ===
Act	Order	Song	Result
Nolo Seodisha	1	"Close the Door" by Teddy Pendergrass	Safe
Virginia Qwabe	2	"Yim Okhthandayo" by Linda Gcwensa	Safe
Mmangaliso Gumbi	3	"Be Without You" by Mary J. Blige	Eliminated
Luyolo Yiba	4	"I Love You" by Thami Shobede	Safe
Micayla Oelofse	5	"Run to You" by Whitney Houston	Safe
Viggy Qwabe	6	"Sthandwa Sami" by Thee Legacy	Safe
Sneziey Msomi	7	"Have You Ever?" by Brandy	Safe

=== Top 6: Showstopper (13 October) ===
Act	Order	Song	Result
Luyolo Yiba	1	"Dance Till You Drop" by NaaqMusiq	Safe
Virginia Qwabe	2	"Khona" by Mafikizolo feat. Uhuru	Eliminated
Viggy Qwabe	3	"Hamba" by Zanda Zakuza	Safe
Sneziey Msomi	4	"Proud Mary" by Tina Turner	Safe
Nolo Seodisha	5	"Speed of Sound" by DaCapo	Safe
Micayla Oelofse	6	"Worth It" by Fifth Harmony feat. Kid Ink	Safe

=== Top 5 (20 October) ===
Act	Order	Song	Order	Song	Result
Micayla Oelofse	1	"Lights" by Ellie Goulding	6	"Until the End of Time" by Justin Timberlake feat. Beyoncé	Safe
Nolo Seodisha	2	"Buza" by Letta Mbulu	7	"What Goes Around... Comes Around" by Justin Timberlake	Safe
Sneziey Msomi	3	"Black Sheep" by Gin Wigmore	8	"Drunk in Love" by Beyoncé feat. Jay-Z	Safe
Luyolo Yiba	4	"Learn to Love Again" by Lawson	9	"Cry Me a River" by Justin Timberlake	Safe
Viggy Qwabe	5	"Sinazo" by Amanda Black	10	"Apologize" by OneRepublic	Withdrew

=== Top 4 (27 October) ===
Act	Order	Song	Order	Song	Result
Nolo Seodisha	1	"Let's Groove" by Earth, Wind & Fire	5	"The Lazy Song" by Bruno Mars	Eliminated
Micayla Oelofse	2	"It Must Have Been Love" by Roxette	6	"Dangerous Woman" by Ariana Grande	Safe
Luyolo Yiba	3	"Nightshift" by The Commodores	7	"OMG" by Usher feat. will.i.am	Safe
Sneziey Msomi	4	"Umuntu Ngabantu" by Brenda Fassie	8	"Superman" by Black Coffee	Safe

=== Top 3 (3 November) ===
Act	Order	Song	Order	Song	Result
Luyolo Yiba	1	"Photograph" by Ed Sheeran	4	"Ikanyesi" by Mondli Nqcobo	Safe
Sneziey Msomi	2	"Save Me" by Thembisile	5	"Bhutiza" by Mobi Dixon feat. Nichume	Safe
Micayla Oelofse	3	"Fallin'" by Alicia Keys	6	"Suited" by Shekhinah	Eliminated

=== Top 2 (10 November) ===
Act	Order	Idols Produced Single	Order	Song	Order	Song	Result
Sneziey Msomi	1	"Kungumusa" by Sneziey Msomi	3	"Through the Fire" by Chaka Khan	5	"Pakisha" by Dladla Mshunqisi feat. Distruction Boyz & DJ Tira	Runner-up
Luyolo Yiba	2	"Sunshine Through The Rain" by Luyolo Yiba	4	"Zanele" by Brian Temba	6	"Abangani" by Sjava	Winner

- Before her elimination Micayla performed her single Tragic.

== Elimination Chart ==
Colour key

–	Winner
–	Runner-up
–	Wild Card
–	Eliminated
–	Withdrew

Weekly results per act
Act	Top 17		Top 10	Top 9	Top 8	Top 7	Top 6	Top 5	Top 4	Top 3	Top 2
Act	Group A	Group B	Top 10	Top 9	Top 8	Top 7	Top 6	Top 5	Top 4	Top 3	Top 2
Luyolo Yiba	—N/a	Safe	Safe	Safe	Safe	Safe	Safe	Safe	Safe	Safe	Winner
Sneziey Msomi	—N/a	Safe	Safe	Safe	Safe	Safe	Safe	Safe	Safe	Safe	Runner-up
Micayla Oelofse	—N/a	Safe	Safe	Safe	Safe	Safe	Safe	Safe	Safe	3rd place	Eliminated
Nolo Seodisha	Safe	—N/a	Safe	Safe	Safe	Safe	Safe	Safe	4th place	Eliminated	
Viggy Qwabe	Safe	—N/a	Safe	Safe	Safe	Safe	Safe	5th place	Withdrew		
Virginia Qwabe	Safe	—N/a	Safe	Safe	Safe	Safe	6th place	Eliminated			
Mmangaliso Gumbi	Safe	—N/a	Safe	Safe	Safe	7th place	Eliminated				
Nqobile Gumede	—N/a	Safe	Safe	Safe	8th place	Eliminated					
Dinky Swartz	Safe	—N/a	Safe	9th place	Eliminated						
Innocentia Sibi	—N/a	Wild Card	10th place	Eliminated							
Craig Jordan	—N/a	11th-17th place	Eliminated								
Treasure Mngadi	—N/a	11th-17th place	Eliminated								
Zia Fielies	—N/a	11th-17th place	Eliminated								
Andy Keys	11th-17th place	Eliminated									
Louise Nicholls	11th-17th place	Eliminated									
Sizwe Hlatshwayo	11th-17th place	Eliminated									
Xola Toto	11th-17th place	Eliminated									
