= Just Go (album) =

Album by Lionel Richie

Studio album by Lionel Richie
- Released: March 10, 2009
- Genre: R&B
- Length: 59:17
- Label: Island
- Producer: Akon; JB & Corron; John Ewbank; Nando Eweg; David Foster; Clayton Haraba; Martin K.; Sean K.; Stargate; Tricky Stewart

Lionel Richie chronology
Sounds of the Season (2006)	Just Go (2009)	Tuskegee (2012)

Singles from Just Go
- 1. "Face in the Crowd" Released: July 18, 2008 (NL); 2. "Good Morning" Released: December 15, 2008; 3. "Just Go" Released: March 12, 2009 (UK); 4. "I'm in Love" Released: May 19, 2009

Just Go is the tenth studio album by American singer Lionel Richie. It was first released by Island Records on March 10, 2009 in the United Kingdom. Richie worked with Tricky Stewart and Norwegian production duo StarGate on the majority of the album, which features additional production from Akon, David Foster, and John Ewbank as well as writing credits by Ne-Yo, Johntá Austin, The-Dream, and Espen Lind. Although Richie had little writing involvement of the songs for Just Go, he did write "Eternity", which is also included on the tribute album Change Is Now: Renewing America's Promise.

The album earned generally positive reviews and debuted at number 24 on the US Billboard 200 and number nine on Top R&B/Hip-Hop Albums. Just Go also entered the top ten in Austria, Germany, and the United Kingdom. By May 2012, it had sold 95,000 copies in the US, according to Nielsen SoundScan, and additional 60,000 units in the UK. The album was preceded by lead single "Good Morning" and follow-up "Just Go" as well as "I'm in Love" and the promotional singles "Face in the Crowd", "Forever and Ever" and "I'm Not Okay".

== Critical reception ==
Professional ratings
Aggregate scores
Source	Rating
Metacritic	(68/100)
Review scores
Source	Rating
Allmusic	3/5 stars
Billboard	(favorable)
Entertainment Weekly	C+
The Guardian	3/5 stars
New York Times	(favorable)
The Observer	(unfavorable)
People	2.5/4 stars
The Times	1/5 stars
Vibe	3.5/5 stars

Upon release, Just Go received positive reviews from music critics. At Metacritic, which assigns a normalized rating out of 100 to reviews from mainstream critics, the album has an average score of 68 based on 6 reviews, indicating "generally favorable reviews". Allmusic editor Andy Kellman wrote that "introducing a 60-year-old artist to a younger audience with new material is asking for a lot, but Richie's devoted fanbase will find plenty to like. Just Go, slightly more so than [previous album] Coming Home, tends to be a happy (and comforting) medium between Richie's familiar approach and contemporary R&B." Caroline Sullivan, writing for The Guardian, remarked that Just Go "finds Richie in reliably smooth voice, ruminating placidly about love. Fair enough; that's what he's for, and he's game enough to couch it [...] He's rarely sounded so unruffled. What would it be like if he let go a bit?"

New York Times journalist Nate Chinen felt that while Just Go came across like "a textbook adult-contemporary album, it also lends credible emotional footing to the songs. It's one reason that Mr. Richie doesn't sound out of his element singing on tracks provided by contemporary R&B hit makers, complete with up-to-the-minute production." People critics Chuck Arnold and Joey Bartolomeo wrote that Akon, The-Dream and Stargate "put a fresh but familiar spin on Richie's sound. Still, the old guy falls into a bit of a midtempo rut." Similarly, Entertainment Weekly critic Leah Greenblatt found that Richie's collaborators "may be top dogs on their own territory, but they don't have much on the old tricks of the Commodore-turned-1980s solo star. On his ninth studio album, undifferentiated swaths of midtempo digital groove leave one longing for the (relative) analog authenticity of vintage Lionel."

== Chart performance ==
In the United States, Just Go debuted at number 24 on the US Billboard 200 and number nine on the Top R&B/Hip-Hop Albums. It became Richie's fifth top ten entry on the latter chart and sold 95,000 copies in the US. In the United Kingdom, it peaked at number 10 on the UK Albums Chart and was certified silver by the British Phonographic Industry (BPI), indicating sales in excess of 60,000 copies.

== Track listing ==
No.	Title	Writer(s)	Producer(s)	Length
1.	"Forever"	Phillip "Taj" Jackson; Mikkel S. Eriksen; Tor Erik Hermansen	Stargate	3:19
2.	"Just Go" (featuring Akon)	Aliaune Thiam; Giorgio Tuinfort	Akon; Tuinfort^{[a]}	4:11
3.	"Nothing Left to Give" (featuring Akon)	Thiam; Tuinfort	Akon; Tuinfort^{[a]}	3:32
4.	"Forever and a Day"	Christopher "Tricky" Stewart; Terius Nash	Stewart	4:04
5.	"I'm Not Okay"	Stewart; Nash	Stewart	3:28
6.	"Good Morning"	Stewart; Nash; James Button; Corron Cole	Stewart; JB & Corron	4:06
7.	"Through My Eyes"	Jackson; Eriksen; Hermansen	Stargate	4:06
8.	"I'm in Love"	Shaffer Smith; Eriksen; Hermansen	Stargate; Ne-Yo^{[a]}	4:05
9.	"Think of You"	Jackson; Eriksen; Hermansen	Stargate; Martin K.	4:12
10.	"Into You Deep"	Stewart; Nash; Sean Hall	Stewart; Sean K.	5:19
11.	"Pastime"	Johntá Austin; Eriksen; Hermansen; Espen Lind; Amund Bjørklund	Stargate	3:52
12.	"Face in the Crowd" (with Trijntje Oosterhuis)	John Ewbank	Ewbank; Nando Eweg; Clayton Haraba	4:21
13.	"Somewhere in London"	Stewart; Nash	Stewart	5:05
14.	"Eternity"	Lionel Richie	David Foster	4:37

Notes

- ^{^[a]} signifies an co-producer

== Charts ==
Chart (2009)	Peak position
Austrian Albums (Ö3 Austria)	9
Belgian Albums (Ultratop Flanders)	89
Dutch Albums (Album Top 100)	22
French Albums (SNEP)	79
German Albums (Offizielle Top 100)	9
Italian Albums (FIMI)	74
Swiss Albums (Schweizer Hitparade)	28
UK Albums (OCC)	10
US Billboard 200	24
US Top R&B/Hip-Hop Albums (Billboard)	9

== Certifications and sales ==
Region	Certification	Certified units/sales
United Kingdom (BPI)	Silver	60,000^{^}
^{^} Shipments figures based on certification alone.
