= Idols South Africa season 16 =

Idols South Africa
- Season 16
- Hosted by: ProVerb
- Judges: Randall Abrahams; Unathi Nkayi; Somizi Mhlongo
- Winner: Zama Khumalo
- Runner-up: Mr Music
- No. of episodes: 21

Release
- Original network: Mzansi Magic
- Original release: 2 August – 13 December 2020

Season chronology
- ← Previous; Season 15 Next → Season 17

The sixteenth season of South African Idols premiered on 2 August 2020, 17:30 SAST and concluded on 13 December 2020 on the Mzansi Magic television network. The season was won by Zama Khumalo and the runner-up was Mr Music.

== Finalists ==
Contestant	Age	Hometown	Place finished
Zama Khumalo	43	Witbank, Mpumalanga	Winner
Mr Music	42	KwaMbonambi, KwaZulu-Natal	Runner-up
Brandon Dhludhlu	34	Barberton, Mpumalanga	3rd
ZanoThando Ngxito	103	Rustenburg, North West	4th
Ndoni Mseleku	22	Johannesburg, Gauteng	5th
Ntokozo Mvelase	21	Kagiso, Gauteng	6th
Bongi Mntambo	25	Welkom, Free State	7th
Jooma Mize	26	Port Elizabeth, Eastern Cape	8th
Be Mohutsiwa	26	Bloemfontein, Free State	9th
Succedor Zitha	22	Waterval Boven, Mpumalanga	10th
Dee Mayekane	25	Khayelitsha, Western Cape	11th-13th
Jerodine Madlala	27	KwaMashu, KwaZulu-Natal	11th-13th
Melanin Zwane	21	Newcastle, KwaZulu-Natal	11th-13th
Ethan Norris	26	Roodepoort, Gauteng	14th-16th
Qhawe Mahlangu	23	KwaThema, Ekurhuleni	14th-16th
Zahn-Reece Malgas	24	Vanderbijlpark, Gauteng	14th-16th

== Weekly Song Choice and Result ==
=== Top 16 ===
==== Boys (20 September) ====
Act	Order	Song	Result
ZanoThando Ngxito	1	"I Got a Woman" by Ray Charles	Safe
Jooma Mize	2	"Always and Forever" by Heatwave	Wild Card
Zahn-Reece	3	"Superstar" by Luther Vandross	Eliminated
Ethan Norris	4	"Feeling Good" by Nina Simone	Eliminated
Succedor Zitha	5	"Emotion" by Destiny's Child	Safe
Mr Music	6	"All I Could Do Was Cry" by Etta James	Safe
Brandon Dhludhlu	7	"Dancing On My Own" by Calum Scott	Safe
Qhawe Mahlangu	8	"Try a Little Tenderness" by Otis Redding	Eliminated

==== Girls (27 September) ====
Act	Order	Song	Result
Jerodine Madlala	1	"Something He Can Feel" by Aretha Franklin	Eliminated
Melanin Zwane	2	"True Colors" by Cyndi Lauper	Eliminated
Bongi Mntambo	3	"All the Man That I Need" by Whitney Houston	Safe
Ndoni Mseleku	4	"Fast Car" by Tracy Chapman	Wild Card
Dee Mayekane	5	"Rolling in the Deep " by Adele	Eliminated
Be Mohutsiwa	6	"How Come You Don't Call Me" by Alicia Keys	Safe
Ntokozo Mvelase	7	"I'd Rather Go Blind" by Etta James	Safe
Zama Khumalo	8	"Crazy" by Seal	Safe

=== Top 10 (11 October) ===
Act	Order	Song	Result
Brandon Dhludhlu	1	"Oh, Freedom" by Odetta Holmes	Safe
Ndoni Mseleku	2	"Ungayeki" by Brenda Mtambo	Safe
ZanoThando Ngxito	3	"Superwoman" by Alicia Keys	Safe
Zama Khumalo	4	"A Change Is Gonna Come" by Sam Cooke	Safe
Mr Music	5	"Iqhawe" by Sjava	Safe
Be Mohutsiwa	6	"Make It Happen" by Mariah Carey	Safe
Jooma Mize	7	"River" by Leon Bridges	Safe
Ntokozo Mvelase	8	"Never Alone" by Tori Kelly	Safe
Succedor Zitha	9	"Higher Ground" by Stevie Wonder	Eliminated
Bongi Mntambo	10	"Spirit" by Beyoncé	Safe

=== Top 9 (18 October) ===
Act	Order	Song	Result
Jooma Mize	1	"Madoda Sabelani" by Loyiso Gijana	Safe
Bongi Mntambo	2	"Stand Up" by Cynthia Erivo	Safe
Ndoni Mseleku	3	"Ndizele Wena" by Amanda Black	Safe
Be Mohutsiwa	4	"Boo'd Up" by Ella Mai	Eliminated
ZanoThando Ngxito	5	"Price To Pay" by Miss Pru feat. Blaq Diamond	Safe
Ntokozo Mvelase	6	"Happiness" by Kelly Khumalo	Safe
Brandon Dhludhlu	7	"Sorry" by Justin Bieber	Safe
Zama Khumalo	8	"Say So" by Doja Cat	Safe
Mr Music	9	"Into Ingawe" by Sun-El Musician feat. Ami Faku	Safe

=== Top 8 (25 October) ===
Act	Order	Song	Result
Bongi Mntambo	1	"Ngiyak'uthanda" by Zandie Khumalo	Safe
Mr Music	2	"Ngempela" by Sjava feat. DJ Maphorisa & Howard	Safe
Zama Khumalo	3	"Finally" by Thabsie	Safe
Brandon Dhludhlu	4	"Angsakwazi" by Musa	Safe
Jooma Mize	5	"Lady Lady" by Masego	Eliminated
ZanoThando Ngxito	6	"NaLingi" by Manu WorldStar	Safe
Ntokozo Mvelase	7	"Focus" by H.E.R.	Safe
Ndoni Mseleku	8	"Inyanga" by Cici	Safe

=== Top 7: Showstoppers (1 November) ===
Act	Order	Song	Result
Zama Khumalo	1	"This Is What You Came For by Calvin Harris feat. Rihanna	Safe
Mr Music	2	"Woza My Love" by Blaq Diamond	Safe
Ndoni Mseleku	3	"Already" by Beyoncé feat. Shatta Wale & Major Lazer	Safe
Bongi Mntambo	4	"Déjà Vu" by Beyoncé feat. Jay-Z	Eliminated
Brandon Dhludhlu	5	"Circles" by Post Malone	Safe
ZanoThando Ngxito	6	"Loyal" by Chris Brown feat. Lil Wayne & Tyga	Safe
Ntokozo Mvelase	7	"Break My Heart" by Dua Lipa	Safe

=== Top 6 (8 November) ===
Act	Order	Song	Order	Song	Result
Ntokozo Mvelase	1	"Upside Down" by Diana Ross	7	"Long As I Live" by Toni Braxton	Eliminated
Mr Music	2	"Remember Me" by Lucky Dube	8	"Ngaqonywa" by Aubrey Qwana	Safe
ZanoThando Ngxito	3	"Mmatswale" by Caiphus Semenya	9	"Mmatswale" by Malaika	Safe
Ndoni Mseleku	4	"Khawuleza" by Bra Hugh Masekela	10	"Ungowami" by Ami Faku	Safe
Brandon Dhludhlu	5	"Sweet Lady" by Tyrese Gibson	11	"Ubala" by Simmy feat. Sun-El Musician	Safe
Zama Khumalo	6	"Wedding Day" by Mzansi feat. Brenda Fassie	12	"Everything I Wanted" by Billie Eilish	Safe

=== Top 5: Theatre Week (15 November) ===
Act	Order	Song	Order	Song	Result
Ndoni Mseleku	1	"Ndicel'ikiss" by Berita	6	"Senzeni" by DJ Manzo SA feat. Comado & Mthandazo Gatya	Eliminated
Mr Music	2	"Ndiyagodola" by Ringo	7	"Emalanjeni" by Sbahle	Safe
Zama Khumalo	3	"A Woman's Worth" by Alicia Keys	8	"Hamba Naye" by Cici feat. Mafikizolo	Safe
Brandon Dhludhlu	4	"7 Years" by Lukas Graham	9	"Your Love" by Azana	Safe
ZanoThando Ngxito	5	"Lean On Me" by Bill Withers	10	"Bella Ciao" by Tyler ICU & Nicole Elocin feat. Kabza De Small & DJ Maphorisa	Safe

=== Top 4 (22 November) ===
Act	Order	Song	Order	Song	Result
Brandon Dhludhlu	1	"Via Orlando" by DJ Vetkuk vs Mahoota feat. Dr. Malinga	5	"Angelina" by Caiphus Semenya	Safe
ZanoThando Ngxito	2	"Set Fire To The Rain" by Adale	6	"It Wasn't Me" by Shaggy	Eliminated
Zama Khumalo	3	"Thobela" by Boom Shaka	7	"Sweet Dreams" by Beyoncé	Safe
Mr Music	4	"It's a Man's Man's Man's World" by James Brown ft Loyiso Gijana	8	"Holy Spirit" by Majek Fashek	Safe

=== Top 3 (29 November) ===
Act	Order	Song	Order	Song	Result
Brandon Dhludhlu	1	"Adore" by Miguel	4	"Why Ngikufela" by Kabza De Small feat. ShaSha	Eliminated
Zama Khumalo	2	"Empini" by Kelly Khumalo	5	"Nia Lo" by Kabza De Small feat. Nia Pearl	Safe
Mr Music	3	"One and Only" by Adele	6	"Tikoloshi" by Soweto’s Finest feat. Kaygee Daking & Bizizi	Safe

=== Top 2 (6 December) ===
Act	Order	Idols Produced Single	Order	Song	Order	Favourite Previous Performance	Result
Mr Music	1	"Ngikethe Kahle" by Mr Music	3	"Ngamthanda Umuntu" by Linda	5	"Into Ingawe" by Sun-El Musician feat. Ami Faku	Runner-up
Zama Khumalo	2	"Ndizobizwa" by Zama Khumalo	4	"Without You" by Mariah Carey	6	"A Change Is Gonna Come" by Sam Cooke	Winner

- Before his elimination Brandon performed his single Uhambe.

== Elimination Chart ==
Colour key

–	Winner
–	Runner-up
–	Wild Card
–	Eliminated

Weekly results per act
Act	Top 16		Top 10	Top 9	Top 8	Top 7	Top 6	Top 5	Top 4	Top 3	Top 2
Act	Boys	Girls	Top 10	Top 9	Top 8	Top 7	Top 6	Top 5	Top 4	Top 3	Top 2
Zama Khumalo	—	Safe	Safe	Safe	Safe	Safe	Safe	Safe	Safe	Safe	Winner
Mr Music	Safe	—	Safe	Safe	Safe	Safe	Safe	Safe	Safe	Safe	Runner-up
Brandon Dhludhlu	Safe	—	Safe	Safe	Safe	Safe	Safe	Safe	Safe	3rd place	Eliminated
ZanoThando Ngxito	Safe	—	Safe	Safe	Safe	Safe	Safe	Safe	4th place	Eliminated	
Ndoni Mseleku	—	Wild Card	Safe	Safe	Safe	Safe	Safe	5th place	Eliminated		
Ntokozo Mvelase	—	Safe	Safe	Safe	Safe	Safe	6th place	Eliminated			
Bongi Mntambo	—	Safe	Safe	Safe	Safe	7th place	Eliminated				
Jooma Mize	Wild Card	—	Safe	Safe	8th place	Eliminated					
Be Mohutsiwa	—	Safe	Safe	9th place	Eliminated						
Succedor Zitha	Safe	—	10th place	Eliminated							
Dee Mayekane	—	11th/13th place	Eliminated								
Jerodine Madlala	—	11th/13th place	Eliminated								
Melanin Zwane	—	11th/13th place	Eliminated								
Ethan Norris	14th/16th place	Eliminated									
Qhawe Mahlangu	14th/16th place	Eliminated									
Zahn-Reece Malgas	14th/16th place	Eliminated									
