= Sounds of the Season (album) =

Studio album by Lionel Richie
- Released: December 4, 2006
- Recorded: 2004
- Studio: Da Crib Studios (Coney Island, New York)
- Genre: Christmas; R&B
- Length: 28:11
- Label: Island Def Jam
- Producer: Chuckii Booker

Lionel Richie chronology
Coming Home (2006)	Sounds of the Season (2006)	Just Go (2009)

Sounds of the Season is the ninth and first Christmas album by American singer Lionel Richie. Recorded during advent in 2004, it was released by The Island Def Jam Music Group on December 4, 2006, in the United States.

== Track listing ==
All tracks produced by Chuckii Booker.

No.	Title	Writer(s)	Length
1.	"Little Drummer Boy"	Harry Simeone; Katherine Kennicott Davis; Henry Onorati	3:55
2.	"Silent Night"	Traditional	4:33
3.	"The First Noel"	Traditional	3:09
4.	"Joy to the World"	Traditional	2:40
5.	"The Christmas Song"	Robert Wells; Mel Tormé	2:59
6.	"O Come All Ye Faithful"	Traditional	3:21
7.	"Have Yourself a Merry Little Christmas"	Hugh Martin; Ralph Blane	5:21
8.	"Winter Wonderland"	Felix Bernard; Richard Bernhard Smith	2:24

== Personnel ==
- Lionel Richie – vocals, arrangements (2–4, 6)
- Chuckii Booker – all instruments (1, 5, 7, 8), backing vocals (1, 8), arrangements (2–4, 6)
- Herman Jackson – acoustic piano (5, 7)
- Dino Soldo – saxophone (7)

=== Production ===
- Joshua Sarubin – A&R
- Shelli Hill – executive producer for NBC Universal
- Sue Peterson – executive producer for Target
- Dirk Vanoucek – associate producer, recording
- Jon Gass – mixing
- Michael Simmons – project coordinator
- Stacey Ward – project manager
- Mathieu Bitton – package design, cover design
- Alfonso Romero – cover design
- Denise Saffren – cover design
- Andrew MacPherson – photography
- David Loeffler and Randy Phillips with PDM, Inc. – management

== Charts ==
Chart (2006)	Peak position
US Top Holiday Albums (Billboard)	43
