= For the Love of Sfiso Ncwane =

2018 book by Ayanda Ncwane

- First edition
- Author: Ayanda Ncwane
- Language: English
- Subject: Autobiography
- Genre: Non-fiction
- Publisher: Izani Publishing
- Publication date: November 02, 2018
- Publication place: South Africa
- Media type: Print
- Pages: 219 pages
- ISBN: 978-0620794695

For the Love of Sfiso Ncwane is an autobiography book by South African singer Sfiso Ncwane. It was released in November 2018 by Izani Publishing. The book was written by Ayanda Ncwane. In this book Ayanda, tells a story of his late husband Sfiso Ncwane his musical career and success.
