= Good Morning (Lionel Richie song) =

Single by Lionel Richie

from the album Just Go
- Released: 15 December 2008
- Genre: R&B
- Length: 4:06
- Label: Island Def Jam
- Songwriter(s): Tricky Stewart; Terius Nash; James Button; Corron Cole
- Producer(s): Stewart; JB & Corron; The-Dream (co.)

Lionel Richie singles chronology
"All Around the World" (2007)	"Good Morning" (2008)	"Just Go" (2009)

"Good Morning" is a single by American singer Lionel Richie. It was written by Tricky Stewart, Teriush "The-Dream" Nash, James Button, and Corron Cole for Richie's ninth studio album Just Go (2009), while production was helmed by Stewart, Button and Cole, with The-Dream credited as a co-producer. The song was released as the album's lead single in 2008. It reached number 67 on the German Albums Chart.

== Track listing ==
CD maxi single
No.	Title	Writer(s)	Producer(s)	Length
1.	"Good Morning"	Tricky Stewart; Terius Nash; James Button; Corron Cole	Stewart; JB & Corron; The-Dream^{[a]}	4:10
2.	"I'm Not Okay"	Stewart; Nash; Button; Cole	Stewart; The-Dream^{[a]}; Kuk Harrell^{[a]}	3:31

Notes

- ^{^[a]} signifies a co-producer

== Charts ==
Chart (2008)	Peak position
Germany (GfK)	67
US Adult R&B Songs (Billboard)	29
