= Sfiso Ncwane =

South African singer (1979-2016)

- Born: Sfiso Ncwane; April 21, 1979; Mthwalume, Port Shepstone
- Died: December 5, 2016 (aged 37); Johannesburg, South Africa
- Resting place: Lala Kahle Cemetery, Ximba
- Occupations: composer; singer; producer; philanthropist
- Spouse: Ayanda Ncwane (m. 2007)
- Children: 3
- Musical career
- Origin: Johannesburg
- Genres: Gospel
- Label: Sfiso Ncwane Productions CC

Sfiso Ncwane (April 21, 1979 – December 5, 2016) was a South African singer and composer.

In 1997, Ncwane joined Mlazi based band called New Edition, joining lead vocalist Ntombifuthi Mntambo and drummer Skhumbuzo Gumede. Ncwane also join a group band called 'One Touch', lead vocalist Mr Joe Gcabashe and the Keyboard players: Sikhona Gumede and Senzo Sabela.

Ncwane signed a record deal with Bula Music and released his debut studio album Makadunyiswe in 2001.

At the 20th ceremony of the Mzansi Gospel Awards, Ncwane won two awards, Best Praise Album of the Year and Worship Album of the Year. His song, Kulungile Baba, was certified 3× platinum in South Africa with sales of 350 000 copies, and he won Record of the Year at the 19th ceremony of South African Music Awards. He was also nominated for SABC's Crown Gospel Awards Song of the Year. On July 5, 2016, his last album, Wethembekile Baba, was released in South Africa.

== Death ==
On December 4, 2016, Ncwane was hospitalized at Life Fourways Hospital, Johannesburg. While there, he died at the age of 37. The cause of death was announced to kidney failure that claimed the award winning gospel artist at an early age.

== Philanthropy ==
He started charity called Sfiso Ncwane Bursary Foundation, which donated school uniforms to children in rural areas.

== Autobiography ==
- Ayanda Ncwane (2018). For the Love of Sfiso Ncwane Kindle Edition, Izani Publishing, ISBN 978-0-620-79469-5

== Discography ==
=== Albums ===
- Makadunyiswe (2001)
- Inombolo Yase Zulwini (2002)
- Umkhuleko (2003)
- S'fiso (2004)
- Best Of S'Fiso (2005)
- Baba Ngiyabonga (2006)
- Uyisiphephelo Sami (2008)
- Baba Ngiyavuma (2009)
- Kulungile Baba (2010)
- Vula Amasango (2011)
- Kulungile Baba Live (2013)
- Bayede Baba (2014)
- Ithemba [feat with beast] (2015)
- Wethembekile Baba (2016)
- Live at ICC Part 2 (2017)
