= I Call It Love =

Single by Lionel Richie

from the album Coming Home
- Released: July 2006
- Genre: R&B
- Length: 3:20
- Label: Island Def Jam
- Songwriters: Mikkel S. Eriksen; Tor Erik Hermansen; Phillip "Taj" Jackson
- Producer: Stargate

Lionel Richie singles chronology
"I Still Believe" (2004)	"I Call It Love" (2006)	"What You Are" (2006)

"I Call It Love" is a song by American singer Lionel Richie. It was written by Mikkel S. Eriksen, Tor Erik Hermansen, and Phillip "Taj" Jackson for Richie's eighth studio album Coming Home (2006), while production was helmed by Eriksen and Hermansen under their production moniker Stargate. The song was released as the album's lead single and reached number-one on Billboard's urban adult contemporary chart. Nicole Richie starred in the accompanying music video.

== Track listing ==
CD maxi single
No.	Title	Writer(s)	Producer(s)	Length
1.	"I Call It Love" (Main Version)	Mikkel S. Eriksen; Tor Erik Hermansen; Taj Jackson	Stargate	3:18
2.	"I Call It Love" (Ernie Lake Sunset Beach Remix)	Eriksen; Hermansen; Jackson	Ernie Lake; Nir Graff^{[a]}	4:08
3.	"I Call It Love" (Moto Blanco Radio Edit)	Eriksen; Hermansen; Jackson	Bobby Blanco; Arthur Smith	3:33
4.	"I Call It Love"	Music video		3:20

Notes

- ^{^[a]} signifies an additional producer

== Charts ==
=== Weekly charts ===
Chart (2006)	Peak position
Canada AC (Billboard)	2
France (SNEP)	33
Germany (GfK)	29
Hungary (Editors' Choice Top 40)	38
Italy (FIMI)	31
Netherlands (Single Top 100)	93
Switzerland (Schweizer Hitparade)	47
UK Singles (Official Charts)	45
US Billboard Hot 100	62
US Adult Contemporary (Billboard)	9
US Dance Club Songs (Billboard)	10
US Hot R&B/Hip-Hop Songs (Billboard)	19

=== Year-end charts ===
Chart (2006)	Position
US Adult Contemporary (Billboard)	21
US Hot R&B/Hip-Hop Songs (Billboard)	67
