= Buyelekhaya =

Studio album by Nathi
- Released: March 10, 2015
- Recorded: 2013–2015
- Genre: afrosoul, Afropop
- Label: Muthaland
- Producer: Various

Nathi chronology
| Buyelekhaya (2015) | Umbulelo Wam (2016) |

Singles from Buyelekhaya
- 1. "Nomvula"; 2. "Noba Ngumama"

Buyelekhaya is the debut studio album by Nathi, a South African recording artist. It was released on 10 March 2015 under Muthaland Entertainment. The tracks "Nomvula" and "Noba Ngumama" were released as singles.

== Commercial performance ==
Upon the release of Buyelekhaya, the album went platinum within six weeks of its release and subsequently triple platinum, receiving positive critical reviews among music critics.

== Accolades ==
At the South African Afro Music Awards Buyelekhaya was nominated for Best Afro Album.

| Year | Nominee / work | Award | Result |
|---|---|---|---|
| 2017 | Buyelekhaya | Best Afro Album | Nominated |

== Track listing ==
| No. | Title | Length |
|---|---|---|
| 1. | ""Nomvula"" | 4:37 |
| 2. | "Imibuzo" | 4:04 |
| 3. | "Noba Ngumama" | 4:30 |
| 4. | "Nomakanjani" (featuring Vusi Nova) | 5:37 |
| 5. | "Liziwe" | 3:59 |
| 6. | "Ndenzenjani" | 4:47 |
| 7. | "Buyele'khaya" | 4:27 |
| 8. | "Ezweni" | 3:55 |
| 9. | "Intliziyo" | 4:46 |
| 10. | "Imizamo Yam" | 4:02 |

== Certifications ==
| Region | Certification | Certified units/Sales |
|---|---|---|
| South Africa (RISA) | 3× Platinum | 90 000+ |
