= Coming Home (Lionel Richie album) =

Album by Lionel Richie

Studio album by Lionel Richie
- Released: September 12, 2006
- Genre: R&B
- Length: 50:35
- Label: Island Def Jam
- Producer: Dallas Austin; Chuckii Booker; Jerry Duplessis; Jermaine Dupri; Sean Garrett; Jake and the Phatman; Wyclef Jean; Rodney Jerkins; Antonio "L.A." Reid (exec.); Lionel Richie; Raphael Saadiq; Roberto Sam Screnci; Manuel Seal; Stargate; Tone Depth

Lionel Richie chronology
Gold (2006)	Coming Home (2006)	Sounds of the Season (2006)

Coming Home is the eighth studio album by American singer Lionel Richie. It was released by The Island Def Jam Music Group on September 12, 2006 in the United States. A breakaway from his previous albums and their adult contemporary sounds, Richie and executive producer Antonio "L.A." Reid recruited a number of sought-after producers and songwriters from the contemporary R&B and hip-hop genres to work with him on the album, including Dallas Austin, Jerry Duplessis, Jermaine Dupri, Sean Garrett, Wyclef Jean, Rodney Jerkins, and Norwegian duo Stargate.

The album earned a generally mixed reception from music critics, who either complimented or dismissed Richie's decision to update his sound. In the United States, Coming Home debuted at number six on the US Billboard 200, becoming his biggest hit album since 1986's Dancing on the Ceiling, while selling up to 449,000 copies. Elsewhere, it reprised the chart success of Renaissance (2000) and Just for You (2004), entering the top ten in Germany and Switzerland and going gold in the United Kingdom. Coming Home produced several singles, including "I Call It Love" and "Why."

== Critical reception ==
Professional ratings
Review scores
Source	Rating
AllMusic	2.5/5 stars
Entertainment Weekly	B−
Okayplayer	1.5/5 stars
People	3/4 stars
PopMatters	3/10
USA Today	2.5/4 stars

People praised Coming Home as a welcome return to R&B, highlighting his successful blend of contemporary production and classic romantic balladry. the magazine singled out "What You Are," " I Call It Love," and "I Love You" while noting weaker uptempo tracks. Steve Jones of USA Today gave Coming Home a two-and-a-half-star rating, noting that the album revisited the smooth style of his Commodores and solo hits. He praised tracks such as "I Call It Love" and "What You Are" while finding the overall set largely predictable. Michael Endelman of Entertainment Weekly gave Coming Home a B− rating, praising Richie's collaboration with younger producers for successfully updating his quiet-storm sound. He highlighted Richie's "silky voice" on tracks such as "All Around the World" and "I Call It Love," while noting the album retained his signature soft-pop ballads.

AllMusic editor Andy Kellman found the album uneven, criticizing its attempts to sound contemporary while praising tracks that remained closer to Richie's established style. He concluded that while some songs lacked distinction, much of the album would satisfy longtime fans. Kel Munger of Sacramento News & Review criticized Coming Home as an unsuccessful comeback attempt, arguing that the album lacked the creativity and emotional impact of his earlier work. She felt the contemporary production failed to recapture the appeal of his classic ballads. Similarly, Okayplayer criticized the album for attempting to chase contemporary R&B trends at the expense of his established style, arguing that most of the album's modern production choices felt awkward and dated. Christian John Wikane of PopMatters dismissed Coming Home for prioritizing contemporary production trends over Richi'’s established artistic identity. He argued that the album often made Richie feel like a guest on his own record, though he praised "Reason to Believe" for allowing the singer's strengths to shine through.

== Chart performance ==
In the United States, Coming Home debuted and peaked at number six on the Billboard 200. It sold over 75,000 copies in its first week and marked Richie's first top 10 album debut of his career. In February 2007, the album was certified gold for the shipment of 500,000 units, and in May 2012 it surpassed the 449,000 mark.

== Track listing ==
Standard edition
No.	Title	Writer(s)	Producer(s)	Length
1.	"I Call It Love"	Phillip "Taj" Jackson; Mikkel S. Eriksen; Tor Erik Hermansen	Stargate	3:18
2.	"Sweet Vacation"	Raphael Saadiq; Robert Ozuna; Lionel Richie	Saadiq; Richie; Jake and the Phatman	3:54
3.	"Why"	Richie; Sean Garrett; Chuckii Booker	Richie; Booker; Garrett	4:00
4.	"What You Are"	Jermaine Dupri; Manuel Seal; Johntá Austin	Dupri; Seal	4:12
5.	"Up All Night"	Richie; Booker; Garrett	Richie; Booker; Garrett	3:35
6.	"I'm Coming Home"	Richie; Booker	Richie; Booker; Rodney Jerkins	4:18
7.	"All Around the World"	Richie; Roberto Sam Screnci	Richie; Screnci; Tone Depth^{[a]}	3:33
8.	"Out of My Head"	Richie	Richie; Booker	3:13
9.	"Reason to Believe"	Richie; Dallas Austin; Tony Reyes	Austin	4:46
10.	"Stand Down"	Richie; Austin	Austin	4:01
11.	"I Love You"	Richie	Richie; Booker	4:11

European edition (bonus tracks)
No.	Title	Writer(s)	Producer(s)	Length
12.	"I Apologize"	Wyclef Jean; Jerry Duplessis; Latavia Parker	Jean; Duplessis	3:37
13.	"I'm Missing Her"	Richie	Richie; Booker	3:57

Notes

- ^{^[a]} signifies an assistant producer

== Charts ==
=== Weekly charts ===
Chart (2006)	Peak position
Austrian Albums (Ö3 Austria)	35
Belgian Albums (Ultratop Wallonia)	47
Dutch Albums (Album Top 100)	20
French Albums (SNEP)	17
German Albums (Offizielle Top 100)	8
Italian Albums (FIMI)	26
Swiss Albums (Schweizer Hitparade)	9
UK Albums (Official Charts)	15
US Billboard 200	6
US Top R&B/Hip-Hop Albums (Billboard)	3

=== Year-end charts ===
Chart (2006)	Position
French Albums (SNEP)	169
UK Albums (Official Charts)	157
US Top R&B/Hip-Hop Albums (Billboard)	84
Chart (2007)	Position
US Top R&B/Hip-Hop Albums (Billboard)	83

== Certifications and sales ==
Region	Certification	Certified units/sales
United Kingdom (BPI)	Gold	100,000^{^}
United States (RIAA)	Gold	500,000^{^}
^{^} Shipments figures based on certification alone.
