= Zama Khumalo =

South African singer (born 2002)

- Born: Zama Adelaide Khumalo; August 25, 2002 (age 24); Witbank, Emalahleni, South Africa
- Occupation: Singer
- Years active: 2020–present
- Television: Idols South Africa
Preceded by Luyolo Yiba	Idols South Africa winner Season 16 (2020)	Succeeded by Berenike Berry Trytsman

Zama Adelaide Khumalo (born 25 August 2002) is a South African singer. She is best known for winning the sixteenth season of South African Idols in 2020. Born in Witbank, Zama signed a record deal with Kalawa Jazmee, and released their debut studio album In The Beginning (2021).

== Career ==
Shortly after she won the competition, Zama began to work on her debut studio album In The Beginning later released in November 2021. In October 29, her single "Is'thunzi" was released as album's lead single.

== Discography ==
- In The Beginning (2021)
