= Just Go (Lionel Richie song) =

Single by Lionel Richie featuring Akon

from the album Just Go
- Released: March 12, 2009
- Length: 4:11
- Label: Island
- Songwriters: Aliaune Thiam; Giorgio Tuinfort
- Producers: Akon; Tuinfort (co.)

Lionel Richie singles chronology
"Good Morning" (2008)	"Just Go" (2009)	"All Night Long" (2011)

Akon singles chronology
"One" (2009)	"Just Go" (2009)	"Overtime" (2009)

"Just Go" is a song by American singer Lionel Richie. It was written and produced by Akon and Giorgio Tuinfort for his ninth studio album Just Go (2009). The song, a duet with Akon, was released on March 12, 2009, as the album's second single. "Just Go" peaked at number 11 on the US Adult Contemporary chart.

== Critical reception ==
Following its UK release, "Just Go" was described by Pete Lewis from Blues & Soul as "a seductively tuneful single with a Caribbean-tinged lilt."

== Music video ==
In the music video, directed by Dominican film maker Jessy Terrero, a young man comes by his girlfriend's workplace to take her out on her birthday. Her manager kindly tells her to go and that he'll cover for her. Richie and Akon then appear, singing the song in a tropical paradise.

== Charts ==
=== Weekly charts ===
Chart (2009)	Peak position
Switzerland (Schweizer Hitparade)	75
UK Singles (Official Charts)	52
US Adult Contemporary (Billboard)	11

=== Year-end charts ===
Chart (2009)	Position
US Adult Contemporary (Billboard)	21
