= Al Bairre =

South African indie pop band

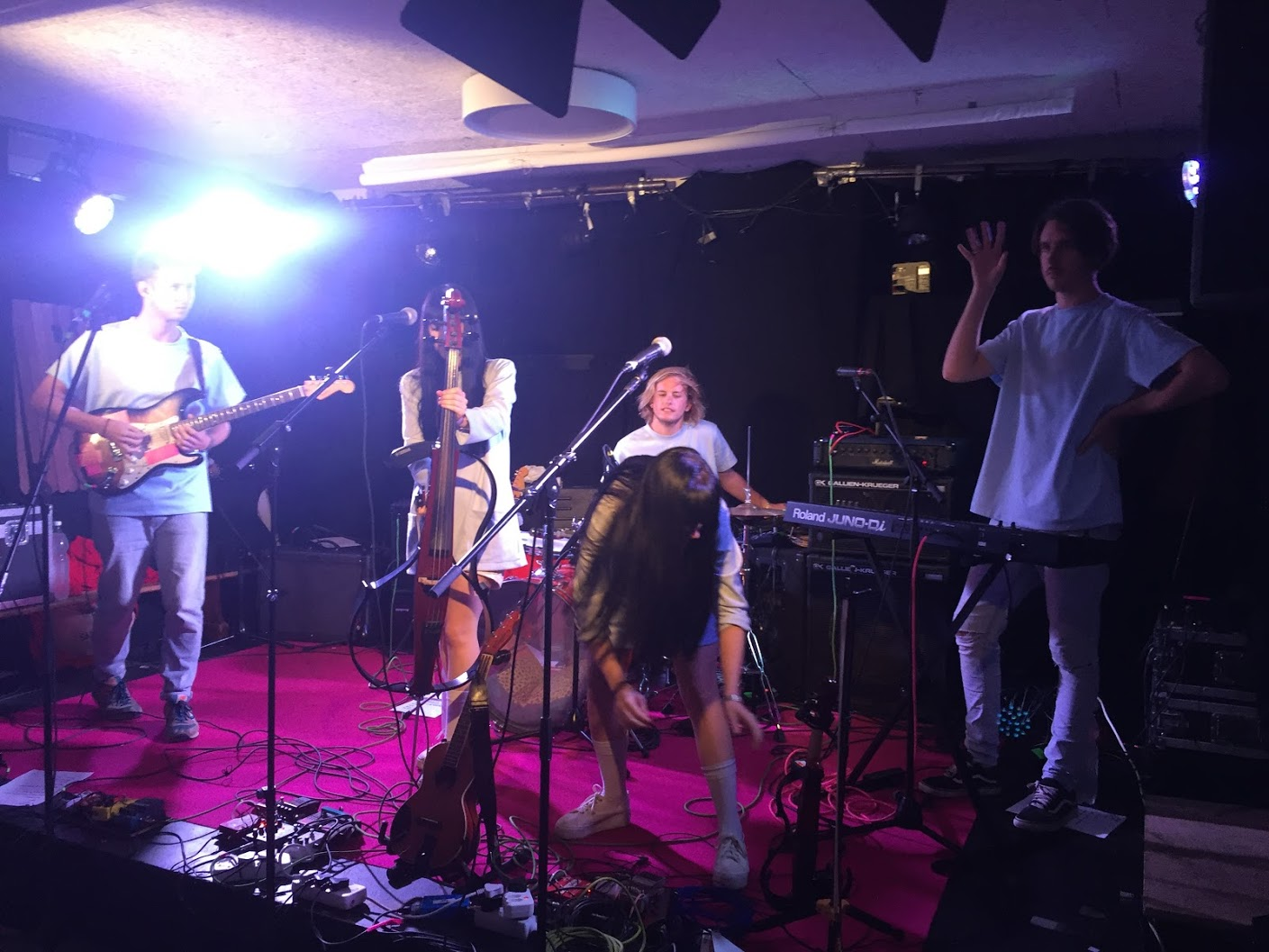
- Concert in Café Bar Treppenhaus, Rorschach, Switzerland, 29 May 2016

Background information
- Origin: Cape Town, South Africa
- Genres: Indie Pop
- Years active: 2012−2017
- Past members: Kyle Davis; Tom Kotze; Nicolas Preen; Tessa Johnson; Julia Johnson

Al Bairre was an Indie pop-rock band from Cape Town that existed between 2012 and 2017.

Over the years, the five-person band (three men, Kyle Davis, Tom Kotze and Nicolas Preen and two women, Tessa Johnson and Julia Johnson) performed in London, UK, Berlin, Germany, Rorschach, Switzerland and various cities in South Africa.

== Publicity ==
During their five years in action, they were featured in various publications including: YES Lifestyle Magazine, THE BIG ISSUE and Your LMG.

== Awards ==
In 2014, Al Bairre won two MK awards (for Best Newcomer and Best Music Video).

== Break up ==
In 2017, the band announced they would be splitting up saying "Having achieved all the goals we set for ourselves over the last 5 years - we all feel like it’s the right time to try something new,"
