= Yanga (singer) =

South African singer-songwriter

Yanga Khoza
- Born: Yanga Sobetwa; 25 April 2001 (age 25); Delft, Cape Town, South Africa
- Other name: Yanga
- Years active: 2018–present
- Known for: Winning Idols South Africa
- Television: Idols South Africa
- Musical career
- Genres: Pop music; R&B; Gospel
- Instruments: Vocals
- Label: Gallo Record Company
- Spouse: Ntsako Khoza (m. 2025)
Preceded by Paxton Fielies	Idols South Africa winner Season 14 (2018)	Succeeded by Luyolo Yiba
- Website: IG.com/yanga_sobetwa

Yanga Khoza (née Sobetwa; born 25 April 2001), is a South African singer-songwriter mononymously known as Yanga. She rose to fame in 2018 subsequent to winning the 14th season of Idols South Africa.

Her debut studio album Promised Land which peaked at number one on iTunes features her label mate and Idols SA season 13 winner Paxton Fielies, and Amanda Black as well as the Grammy Award-winning Soweto Gospel Choir, it was the first time the winner of the show reached the spot.

The Cape Town singer followed in Fielies' footsteps after winning the event in 2018 as she was nearly the same age as her at the time she won the talent show, Sobetwa had her prize money frozen for a year or so and decided to live off of gig money and sponsors for the time being.

== Personal life ==
On 24 April 2025 she married Ntsako Khoza in Krugersdorp, Gauteng.

== Awards and nominations ==
In 2022 Sobetwa received an honorary adult friend award at the World's Children's Prize Ceremony. She forms part of the honorary recipient, with the late former president of South Africa Nelson Mandela and others who became ambassadors for children across the globe.

Year	Award ceremony	Category	Recipient/Nominated work	Results	Ref.
2020	South African Music Awards	Best R&B/Soul Album	Promised Land	Nominated	

== Discography ==
- Promised Land (2019)

== Filmography ==
=== Television ===
Year	Title	Role	Notes	Results	Ref.
2018	Idols South Africa (season 14)	Herself	Contestant	1st place	
