= Langa Mavuso =

South African singer

- Born: Nkosinathi Nhlakanipho Mavuso; 25 January 1994 (age 32); Johannesburg, South Africa
- Origin: Johannesburg, South Africa
- Genres: Jazz

Nkosinathi Nhlakanipho Mavuso (born 25 January 1994), known by his stage name Langa Mavuso, is a South African singer, songwriter and performer from Johannesburg, South Africa. The singer released his debut EP Liminal Sketches consisting of six songs in 2016. He gained attention in the South African music industry after the release of his EP Home.

== Early life and education ==
Mavuso was born on 25 January 1994 in Diepkloof, Johannesburg, South Africa. The singer completed high school at the National School of the Arts where he studied contemporary music. He attended Rhodes University where he obtained his BA in politics and economics and later studied jazz performance at the University of Cape Town's school of music.

== Career ==
He heard a lot of music from a very young age; both his parents were singers and he grew up going to choir rehearsals and choral competitions with them. He always knew he wanted to be an entertainer and his very first stage appearance was in high school. The singer started recording his debut EP in 2016 after returning home from Cape Town where he was doing his studies. The singer has worked with Spoek Mathambo since he was 17 and he performed with Spoek once in 2012 at the Brickfields music festival.

He released his debut EP Liminal Sketches on 30 October 2016 which is made up of four songs, an interlude, and a bonus track featuring Bongeziwe Mabandla. The singer later released a collaborative EP called Home with Redbull studios. Black Coffee watched a video of Langa Mavuso singing Sunday Blues on iTunes and he got hooked; Black Coffee played Sunday Blues to John Legend's manager who also got captivated by the song. The singer wrote his single "Sunday Blues" a few years ago and later reworked it with Black Coffee, after which he signed to Black Coffee's label Soulistic Music.

== Musical style ==
The singer grew up listening to musicians like Caiphus Semenya, Ringo Starr, Stimela, and Whitney Houston. Langa Mavuso started singing at a very young age when someone heard him sing in the bathroom and told his teacher; the teacher made him sing in front of everyone, which is how he started singing at school events. Langa describes his voice as flawed, husky, and coarse as well as rich, sweet, and alluring. In an interview with Mahlohonolo Magadla for Drum, Langa describes his music as soul and R&B. The singer describes what comes out of his mouth as simply a sonic painting of what he feels in his spirit and soul. He explains that music is how he says what he needs to say and channels it through his music. The singer describes his lyrics and narratives as urban African stories; he writes about what he has experienced and wants to experience.

== Inspiration ==
The singer's work is inspired in part by a fan, Latita Kowa, who supported him via social media. His music reflects different phases of love he has experienced; his EP Liminal Sketches was about losing love and his EP Home is about being betrayed by love. For Liminal Sketches, the singer worked with Illa N, Spoek Mathambo, and Bongeziwe Mabandla and all the tracks are about a past love who died a few years ago; the EP was a way for the singer to resolve issues regarding the loved one, a way of finding himself after the loss, and reassuring himself.

Mavuso recorded the EP Home after going through a break-up that he used as inspiration for "Sunday Blues" and "Home"; the singer describes that he went through a lot because of the relationship and his single "Mvula" is a continuation of the heartbreak as it talks about letting go of love that has caused so much pain. The singer worked with Redbull Studios on the EP Home and then worked with Black Coffee's label Soulistic Music on his 11-track Langa album, released in 2020.

== Discography ==
Albums

- Langa (2020)

Extended plays

- Home (2017)
- Liminal Sketches (2018)

Singles

- "Mvula" (2019)

== Nominations ==
Mavuso was nominated in the Rising Star category for the annual DSTV Mzansi Viewers Choice Awards in 2018.
