= Paxton (singer) =

South African singer-songwriter

- Born: Paxton Fielies; 17 September 2000 (age 26); Bishop Lavis, Cape Town, South Africa
- Genre: Pop
- Occupations: Singer, songwriter
- Instrument: Vocals
- Years active: 2017–present
- Television: Idols South Africa
- Label: Gallo
Preceded by Noma Khumalo	Idols South Africa winner Season 13 (2017)	Succeeded by Yanga Sobetwa

Paxton Fielies (born September 17, 2000), better known mononymously as Paxton, is a South African singer, songwriter and philanthropist. She rose to fame in 2017, after winning the 13th season of Idols South Africa. She is the youngest South African female to win the title.

== Life and career ==
=== Early life ===
Paxton Fielies was born on 17 September 2000 in Bishop Lavis, Cape Town. She developed an interest in music at the age of 7 when she joined the New Apostolic Church children's choir. In 2013, she decided to leave the choir and focus on school. She began sharing covers of popular songs on social media. She gained substantial exposure when her cover of "Lay Me Down" by English singer-songwriter Sam Smith went viral.

=== Idols South Africa Season 13 ===
Paxton has stated that her mother was the main reason why she decided to audition for Idols South Africa and viewed 2017 as a risk-taking year. "I knew it would be a year of sacrifice. I could concentrate on my education or I could break into the entertainment industry. I couldn't do both. But I also knew that even if I struck gold, I never only want to be just an Idols winner. I want to be much more," she told WeekendSpecial in an interview. She was the first person to receive a Golden Ticket in the Cape Town auditions for Idols Season 13 when she auditioned with Tori Kelly's "Confetti."

During the competition's "Theatre Week", her rendition of "American Boy" by Estelle earned her a place among the season's top 16 performers. Some of Paxton's most noted performances on the show include her renditions of "Over the Rainbow" by Judy Garland, "Careless Whisper" by George Michael, "Side to Side" by Ariana Grande and "Listen" by Beyoncé. She debuted her first single "Demonstrate" on her last competitive performance on the show. Paxton is the youngest person to win Idols since Jody Williams in 2007.

=== Idols Performances ===
Top 2	"American Boy" by Estelle and "Over The Rainbow" by Judy Garland
Top 3	"Stay" by Rihanna Feat. Mikky Ekko and "Killing Me Softly" by Fugees
Top 4	"Turn To You" by Christina Aguilera and "Common" by Alicia Keys
Top 5	"Walk Away" by Jade and '"Stand Up For Love'" by Destiny's Child
Top 6	"Listen" by Beyoncé and "Just The Way You Are" by Bruno Mars
Top 7	"Cheap Thrills" by Sia
Top 8	"Over The Rainbow" by Judy Garland
Top 9	"Careless Whisper" by George Michael
Top 10	"Side To Side" by Ariana Grande
Top 16	"Here" by Alessia Cara

=== 2018 ===
Soon after winning Idols, she was interviewed by various media outlets and performed at live venues and on television talk shows. Her first major career performance came in December 2017 when she sang live at the "Cape Town Festival Of Lights" at Grand Parade, Cape Town. She continued promoting her brand with performances of songs from other artists, and her own single, Demonstrate, which served as the first single from her then-upcoming debut album. Recording and production for the project began in January 2018.

On 9 February 2018, her first collaborative song, Smother, alongside Pop and R&B singer-songwriter, Craig Lucas, was released. The song served as the second single off of Lucas' debut studio album, Restless. It was met with highly positive reviews, mostly for its production and Paxton and Lucas' vocal performances. It achieved commercial success, reaching number one on a number of South African music charts. It was certified gold in June 2019, over a year after its release. In promotion, Paxton and Lucas have performed the song at multiple venues, most notably at the Cape Town Philharmonic Orchestra Debut Gala. In March 2018, Paxton performed at the Huawei KDay Festival and went on promoting her brand.

In May 2018, she "teased" Angifuni, the second lead single from her debut album. It was released on 18 May 2018 to highly positive reviews. It was praised for its Afro-Pop production, lyrical content and the use of the Zulu language, since Paxton is a coloured artist. It debuted at number 10 on the South African music charts and eventually peaked at number one. It is her most commercially successful single to date.

On 1 June 2018, Paxton's debut album, This Is Me, was digitally released for download and streaming. It was well-received, with many critics noting the various influences of different genres on the project. Physical copies were later made available. Promotion for the album commenced. In July 2018, when on a personal album tour, she performed at the White Nights of Saint Petersburg Festival in Russia, one of the country's biggest cultural events. When she returned to South Africa, she performed as one of the opening acts for R&B/Soul singer, Karyn White's African leg of her "Divas 2018" concert tour. In September 2018, after celebrating her 18th birthday, she went on a club tour to further promote her album.

On 15 October 2018, "Where Are You Now?" was released as the third single from This Is Me. The song garnered favourable reviews. It received moderate commercial success. She performed Nkosi Sikelel' iAfrika at the Currie Cup Finals 2018 in South Africa. She continued with music promotion into the new year.

=== 2019 ===
In January 2019, she appeared on the cover of Club X magazine. This is a project she had been working on since November 2018. In February, she performed as an opening act for a show by R&B singer, Tamia, in Cape Town, South Africa, as part of her "Passion Like Fire" tour. On 13 March 2019, Paxton released "Kiss The Haze", simultaneously with its music video, as the fourth single from This Is Me. The song is in collaboration with R&B/Soul and Afro-Pop artist, Tresor. The song was met with favourable reviews, mostly for its production. On 25 March 2019, Paxton performed at the Musexpo in Los Angeles, Carlifornia and acquired a pending international recording deal, due to this performance. In late April, she was nominated at the South African Music Awards for Best Pop Album and Newcomer of the Year. In May 2019, she was featured on Pop/R&B artist, Yanga's debut album, Promised Land, for the song "Catch Me". On 15 November 2019, she released a non-album single, "No Distractions", a collaboration with House DJ, Dr Moruti.

== Philanthropy ==
In April 2018, Paxton attended the World Children's Prize Foundation ceremony in Sweden. She sang there in the presence of other performers from around the globe and Queen Silvia. She and seven others were awarded a crystal globe and became ambassadors for the queen's "You, Me: Equal Rights" campaign, advocating for equal rights and opportunities among children of all genders. This marked the beginning of her philanthropy. She returned to Sweden for the 2019 ceremony. It was held in May and Paxton and the seven other ambassadors from Cape Town performed at the ceremony. After their return from the World Children's Prize ceremony in 2018, they had been given an assignment to write an essay about girls' rights which was printed in The Globe, which is a World Children's Prize magazine, in 2019.

With the support of the Western Cape Department of Education, Paxton, alongside MEC Debbie Schäfer and radio DJ Carl Wastie launched the "Raise your voice, not your phone" anti-bullying campaign in August 2018. The campaign aims at educating people on the dangers of bullying and sharing videos of bullying taking place on social media. Paxton has performed at Benefit concerts such as the "CHOC Benefit Concert", which is aimed at raising awareness for children diagnosed with cancer and blood disorders and the "Euwin Stevens Benefit Concert" which occurred on Mandela Day, aimed at educating people on the importance of education.

She and Pop singer, Jarrad Ricketts, partnered up with Peninsula School Feeding Associations in August 2019, to raise awareness about hunger among children. The campaign required people to make donations to help feed some of the local children.

== Personal life ==
She has put her high school studies on hold and is currently focusing on her career.

In late 2018, she was a victim of cyber-bullying when Facebook meme creator, Isaac Meyer, began making memes making fun of her looks, hair, family and cultural background. After a few months, she spoke out publicly about this incident. "My mom always says whatever happens in your childhood or teenage years goes with you forever. I know people who are over 30 and still remember that one person who bullied them in school or the exact incident and how it happened. It ruins young people's self-esteem," she told Times Live.

== Discography ==
=== Studio albums ===
- This Is Me (2018)
- 23:23 (2023)

=== Singles ===
- Demonstrate (2017) (From This Is Me)
- It’s Over (2026) (It’s Over)
- Smother (with Craig Lucas) (2018) (From Restless - Craig Lucas)
- Angifuni (2018) (From This Is Me)
- Where Are You Now? (2018) (From This Is Me)
- Kiss The Haze (with Tresor) (2019) (From This Is Me)
- So High (with Shekhinah) (2023)(from “23:23”)
- Be There (with Majorsteez) (2023) (from "23:23")
- Touch & Go (2023) (from 23:23)
- No Distractions (with Dr Moruti) (2019) (Non-Album Single)

== Videography ==
=== As lead artist ===
List of music videos as lead artist, with other performers, directors, album title and showing year released
Title	Other performer(s)	Directors(s)	Album	Year
"Demonstrate"	N/A	N/A	This Is Me	2017
"Smother" (Live Video)	Craig Lucas	N/A	Restless	2018
"Angifuni" (Lyric Video)	N/A	Matthew Marinus	This Is Me	2018
"Angifuni"	N/A	N/A	This Is Me	2018
"Where Are You Now?" (Lyric Video)	N/A	JP Crouch, Graeme Watkins	This Is Me	2018
"Kiss The Haze"	Tresor	N/A	This Is Me	2019
"No Distractions"	Dr Moruti	N/A	Non-Album Single	2019

== Concert Tours ==
=== Opening act ===
- Karyn White – Divas 2018 (2018)
- Tamia – Passion Like Fire Tour (2019)

== Awards and nominations ==
List of awards and nominations, showing the award, category, work and result
Year	Award	Category	Work	Result
2019	South African Music Awards	Best Pop Album	This Is Me	Nominated
2019	South African Music Awards	Newcomer of the Year	Herself	Nominated
