= Nathi =

South African singer-songwriter

- Born: Nkosinathi Mankayi; 23 December 1982 (age 43); Mthatha, Eastern Cape, South Africa
- Genres: Afropop, afrosoul
- Occupation: Singer-songwriter
- Instrument: Vocals
- Years active: 2000–present
- Labels: Ghetto Ruff/Muthaland; Gallo Record Company

Nkosinathi Mankayi (born 23 December 1982), professionally known as Nathi, is a South African singer-songwriter.

He shot to limelight upon the release of his critically acclaimed song titled "Nomvula" off his triple-platinum debut studio album Buyelekhaya. He later released his second album titled Umbulelo Wam on 28 October 2016. He is presently signed under Gallo Record Company.The in 2025 he released his song titled"Bhunguza lam "with Lazola and others

== Early life ==
Nkosinathi Mankayi was born among five siblings to a single mother in Mthatha, a small town in Eastern Cape, South Africa. He grew up in Maclear, Eastern Cape, South Africa where he was educated and developed an interest in music and drawing. In 2006, Nathi was sentenced to 8 years in prison for a 2002 robbery-related crime. He was however released after serving 4 years.

== Career ==
=== 2008–2014: Early beginnings ===
With the aim of pursuing a career in music, Nathi competed and won a local music competition known as "Dare to Dream". He had his share of luck in November 2014 after Vusi Nova heard him sing and insisted on featuring him on a song titled "Noma Kanjani", a song that was well received and went on to get massive airplay around South Africa.

Nathi has one child born in 2017 and a sister who is also a singer.

=== 2015–2017: Buyelekhaya and Umbulelo Wam ===
Nathi started recording his debut studio album titled Buyelekhaya in late 2014, releasing "Nomvula" as its lead single in 2015. Upon the release of the song, it became an instant hit, winning the "Best Selling Full-Track Download" at the 22nd South African Music Awards. On 10 March 2015, through Muthaland Entertainment, Nathi released Buyelekhaya to critical and commercial acceptance by going platinum within six weeks of its release, selling over 128,000 units. At the 22nd South African Music Awards, Nathi won five awards with Buyelekhaya winning the "Best-Selling Album of the Year" and "Best R&B / Soul / Reggae Album" categories.

On 28 October 2016, he released a 12-track sophomore album titled Umbulelo Wam. The album charted on #2 on iTunes and sold over 35,000 units.

=== 2018-present: Iphupha Labantu, Usiba Lwe Gazi ===
He signed a record deal with Gallo Record Company and release his third studio album Iphupha Labantu on July 27, 2018. The album won award for Best African Adult Contemporary Album at 25th South African Music Awards.

His fourth studio album Usiba Lwe Gazi, was released on October 21, 2022. It won Best African Adult Contemporary Album at the 29th ceremony of South African Music Awards.

== Discography ==
=== Studio albums ===
List of studio albums, with selected chart positions
Title	Album details	Peak chart positions						Certifications	Sales
Title	Album details	NGR	RSA	GHA	SWE	UK	US Released:15 June 2014	Certifications	Sales
Buyelekhaya	Released: 10 March 2015; Label: Muthaland Entertainment; Format: CD, digital download	–	—	—	—	—	—	3× Platinum	90,000
Umbulelo Wam	Released: 28 October 2016; Label: Muthaland Entertainment; Format: CD, digital download	—	—	—	—	—	—		35,000
Iphupha Labantu	Released: 27 July 2018; Label: Gallo Record Company; Format: CD, digital download	—	—	—	—	—	—		
Usiba Lwe Gazi	Released: 14 October 2022; Label: Format: CD, digital download	—	—	—	—	—	—		
"—" denotes a recording that did not chart or was not released in that territory.

== Singles ==
=== As lead artist ===
List of singles as lead artist, with selected chart positions and certifications, showing year released and album name
Title	Year	Peak chart positions	Certifications	Album
Title	Year	ZA	Certifications	Album
"Qeqe (Emathandweni)"	2018	—		
"Igazi"	2021	—		
"Home Boiiz" (Elten BPE, Nathi)	2024	—		
"—" denotes a recording that did not chart or was not released in that territory.

== Awards and nominations ==
Year	Award ceremony	Prize	Work/Recipient	Result	Ref
2016	15th Metro FM Music Awards	Best African Pop Album	Buyelekhaya	Won	
2016	15th Metro FM Music Awards	Best Male Album	Buyelekhaya	Nominated	
2016	15th Metro FM Music Awards	Best New Artist	Himself	Nominated	
2016	15th Metro FM Music Awards	Best R&B Single	"Nomvula"	Nominated	
2016	15th Metro FM Music Awards	Song of the Year	"Nomvula"	Won	
2016	22nd South African Music Awards	Album of the Year	Buyelekhaya	Nominated	
2016	22nd South African Music Awards	Male Artist of the Year	Himself	Won	
2016	22nd South African Music Awards	Newcomer of the Year	Himself	Won	
2016	22nd South African Music Awards	Best R&B/Soul/Reggae Album	Buyelekhaya	Won	
2016	22nd South African Music Awards	Best Selling Album	Buyelekhaya	Won	
2016	22nd South African Music Awards	Best Selling Full-Track Download	"Nomvula"	Won	
2019	Eastern Cape Music Awards	Best EC National Recognised Artist	Himself	Nominated	
2023	South African Music Awards	Best African Adult Contemporary Album	Usiba Lwe Gazi	Won	
