= Nomvula =

- Gender: Female
- Language: Nguni languages

Other gender
- Masculine: Mvula

Origin
- Meaning: Rain

Other names
- Variant form: Mvulenhle

Nomvula is a feminine given name, derived from the Nguni word mvula, meaning "rain". Notable people with the name include:

- Nomvula Hlangwana (born 1951), South African politician
- Nomvula Kgoale (born 1995), South African soccer player
- Nomvula Mathibela (born 1941), South African politician
- Nomvula Mokonyane (born 1963), South African politician
- Nomvula Ponco, South African politician
- Thandolwethu Emily Nomvula Sikwila (born 1993), Zimbabwean musician
