= Nouvelle Star season 6 =

Nouvelle Star
- Season 6
- Hosted by: Virginie Efira
- Judges: André Manoukian, Lio, Sinclair, Philippe Manœuvre
- Winner: Amandine Bourgeois
- Runner-up: Benjamin Siksou

Release
- Original release: 21 February – 13 June 2008

Season chronology
- ← Previous; Season 5 Next → Season 7

The sixth season of Nouvelle Star aired from 21 February to 13 June 2008. Virginie Efira hosted her third season. Novelties of the season were brought with a change in the judging panel as André Manoukian remained as the only former jury member. Next to him, Lio, Sinclair and Philippe Manœuvre judged the contestants for the first time. Also a veto power was introduced in which the judges had the right to save an eliminated contestant which they used at their first opportunity. A similar element was later seen in the eighth season of American Idol.

The series was won by 28-year-old Amandine Bourgeois, who became the second female winner of the show.

Auditions were held in the following cities:

Marseille
Lille
Toulouse
Rennes
Lyon
Brussels
Paris
Strasbourg (first time used as a casting location)

The season also saw several contestants using artistic names instead of their real ones:

== Candidates ==
Name	Real Name	Pseudonym
Amandine	Amandine Bourgeois	-
Axelle		-
Benjamin	Benjamin Siksou	-
Cédric	Cédric Oheix	-
Cindy	Cindy Aghostino	-
Clément		-
Fred		-
Jules	Julien Pélissier	-
Julie	Julie Bessard	Julia Mary puis Bessa
Julien	Julien Pierson	Peter Sunson
Kristov	Christophe Leroy	-
Lucile	Lucile Malghem	Lucile Luzely
Siân	Siân Pottok	-
Thomas	Thomas Marfisi	-
Ycare	Assane Attié	-

The judges this series were eligible to exercise a veto power on one eliminated contestant at any given point of the competition and spare them from elimination. The power was exercised in the very first live programme when Kristov received the fewest votes and thus no-one was sent home the first week.

Top 10 Finalists

Date	Theme	Bottom Three
9 April	Rock	Kristov Leroy	Ycare Cavens	Lucile Malghem
16 April	Big Band	Julien Pierson	Kristov Leroy (2)	Thomas Marfisi
23 April	Personal	Siân Pottok http://fr.akamusic.com/sianpottok	Ycare Cavens (2)	Kristov Leroy (3)
30 April	Unplugged	Kristov Leroy (4)	Lucile Malghem (2)	Ycare Cavens (3)
7 May	Viewer's Choice	Thomas Marfisi (2)	Ycare Cavens (4)	Benjamin Siksou
15 May	Free Choice 1	Lucile Malghem (3)	Jules Pélissier	Ycare Cavens (5)
		Bottom Two
21 May	Free Choice 2	Jules Pélissier (2)	Ycare Cavens (6)
28 May	Movie Song	Ycare Cavens (7)	Benjamin Siksou (2)
4 June	Love Song	Cédric Oheix (2)	Benjamin Siksou (3)
11 June	Grand Finale	Benjamin Siksou (4)	Amandine Bourgeois

== Elimination chart ==
Legend
Female	Male	Top 10	Top 15

Stage:		Top 15	Finals									
Week:		4/2	4/9	4/16	4/23	4/30	5/7	5/15	5/21	5/28	6/4	6/11
Place	Contestant	Result										
1	Amandine Bourgeois	Viewers										Winner
2	Benjamin Siksou	Viewers					Btm 3			Btm 2	Btm 2	Runner-up
3	Cédric Oheix	Viewers							Btm 3		Elim	
4	Ycare Cavens	Viewers	Btm 2		Btm 2	Btm 3	Btm 2	Btm 3	Btm 2	Elim		
5	Jules Pelissier	Viewers						Btm 2	Elim			
6	Lucile Malghem	Viewers	Btm 3			Btm 2		Elim				
7	Thomas Marisi	Viewers		Btm 3			Elim					
8	Kristov Leroy	Viewers	Saved	Btm 2	Btm 3	Elim						
9	Siân Pottok	Judges			Elim							
10	Julien Pierson	Viewers		Elim								
11-15	Axelle	Elim										
11-15	Cindy Agostinho	Elim										
11-15	Clément Falgous	Elim										
11-15	Fred	Elim										
11-15	Julie Bessard	Elim										
