= Nouvelle Star season 7 =

Nouvelle Star
- Season 7
- Hosted by: Virginie Guilhaume
- Judges: Philippe Manœuvre, André Manoukian, Lio, Sinclair
- Winner: Soan Faya
- Runner-up: Leïla Aissaoui

Release
- Original network: M6
- Original release: February 24 – June 9, 2009

Season chronology
- ← Previous; Season 6 Next → Season 8

The 7th season of Nouvelle Star premiered on February 24, 2009, on M6. Soan Faya was declared the winner on June 9, 2009, beating out runner-up Leïla Aissaoui.

== Changes & Early Process ==
Virginie Guilhaume became the new host of Nouvelle Star, succeeding previous host Virginie Efira. Philippe Manœuvre, André Manoukian, Lio, and Sinclair reprised their roles as judges on the show. The show also adopted a new opening title sequence, similar to that of American Idol.

Auditions were held from October 13 to December 6, 2008, in Marseille, Lille, Toulouse, Rennes, Lyon and Paris.

== Contestants ==
Top 10 Finalists

- Soan Faya (27) - Winner
- Leïla Aissaoui (18) - Runner-up
- Camélia Jordana (16)
- Thomas Bonneau (17)
- Dalé (24)
- Damien Vanni (29)
- Lary Lambert (20)
- Mahdi Jaggae (27)
- Mélissa Reffas (18)
- Yoann Pigny (21)

NOTE: Lary selected as the 10th finalist by the jury.

Semifinalists (Top 15)

- Antoine Vignette (25)
- Charlotte Robin (21)
- Maria Paz (21)
- Mickaël Frémeaux (25)
- Yasmina (17)

Eliminations - Top 10

Date	Theme	Bottom Three
14 April		Yoann Pigny	Leïla Aissaoui	Thomas Bonneau
21 April	Love Songs	Mélissa Reffas	Thomas Bonneau (2)	Leïla Aissaoui (2)
28 April	Dance Floor	Mahdi Jaggae	Leïla Aissaoui (3)	Lary Lambert
5 May		Lary Lambert (2)	Thomas Bonneau (3)	Dalé Grenoble
12 May	Cinema	Damien	Leïla Aissaoui (4)	Dalé Grenoble (2)
19 May	Viewer's Choice	Dalé Grenoble (3)	Soan Faya	Thomas Bonneau (4)
		Bottom Two
26 May	Quarterfinal	Thomas Bonneau (5)	Camélia Jordana
2 June	Semifinal	Camélia-Jordana (2)	Soan Faya (2)
9 June	Final	Leïla Aissaoui (5)	Soan Faya

== Semifinalists ==
The jury selected fifteen contestants to move onto the live semifinal round, which aired April 7. At the end of the show, nine contestants were voted through to the top ten by the public. The jury then selected one contestant from the bottom six to advance to the finals.

Soan Faya was the winner of this season.

Advancing to the Top 10 (Public Vote) - Dalé • Camélia Jordana • Damien • Mahdi • Leïla • Soan • Mélissa • Thomas • Yoann

Jury's Choice - Lary

Semifinalist (Age)	Song	Original Artist	Jury Vote				Result
Semifinalist (Age)	Song	Original Artist	Manœuvre	Manoukian	Lio	Sinclair	Result
Antoine Vignette (25)	Viva La Vida	Coldplay					Eliminated
Charlotte Robin (21)	You Know I'm No Good	Amy Winehouse					Eliminated
Maria Paz (21)	Porque Te Vas	Jeanette					Eliminated
Mickaël Frémeaux (25)	Voyage, Voyage	Desireless					Eliminated
Yasmina (17)	I Was Made For Loving You	Kiss					Eliminated

== Finalists ==
=== Soan Faya ===
Soan Faya - 27 years old, auditioned in Paris.

	Song(s)	Original Artist(s)	Jury Vote				Callout / Result
	Song(s)	Original Artist(s)	Manœuvre	Manoukian	Lio	Sinclair	Callout / Result
Top 15	Le Vent Nous Portera	Noir Désir					6th / Top 10
Top 10	Ma Petite Entreprise	Alain Bashung					3rd / Top 9
Top 9	Boys Don't Cry	The Cure					5th / Top 8
Top 8	Les Mots bleus	Christophe					1st / Top 7
Top 7	Alabama Song	The Doors				Absent	1st / Top 6
Top 6	Requiem pour un con	Serge Gainsbourg					2nd / Top 5
Top 6	My Way	Frank Sinatra					2nd / Top 5
Top 5	Seven Nation Army	The White Stripes					4th / Bottom 2
Top 5	Ces gens-là	Jacques Brel					4th / Bottom 2
Top 4	La mauvaise réputation	Georges Brassens / Sinsemilia					1st / Top 3
Top 4	One	U2					1st / Top 3
Top 3	Poupée de cire, poupée de son	France Gall					2nd / Top 2
Top 3	L'acordéonniste	Edith Piaf					2nd / Top 2
Top 3	Personal Jesus	Depeche Mode					2nd / Top 2
Finale	Je veux du soleil	Au P'tit Bonheur					1st / Winner
Finale	Aux sombres héros de l'amer	Noir Désir					1st / Winner
Finale	Break On Through	The Doors					1st / Winner

=== Leïla Aissaoui ===
Leïla Aissaoui - 18 years old, auditioned in Rennes.

	Song(s)	Original Artist(s)	Jury Vote				Callout / Result
	Song(s)	Original Artist(s)	Manœuvre	Manoukian	Lio	Sinclair	Callout / Result
Top 15	Marcia Baila	Rita Mitsouko					5th / Top 10
Top 10	My Baby Just Cares For Me	Nina Simone					9th / Bottom 2
Top 9	Dès que je te vois	Vanessa Paradis					7th / Bottom 3
Top 8	Wannabe	Spice Girls					6th / Bottom 2
Top 7	Frozen	Madonna				Absent	2nd / Top 6
Top 6	Think	Aretha Franklin					5th / Bottom 2
Top 6	Parle plus bas	Dalida					5th / Bottom 2
Top 5	Babooshka	Kate Bush					1st / Top 4
Top 5	Ma plus belle histoire d'amour	Barbara					1st / Top 4
Top 4	Girls Just Wanna Have Fun	Cyndi Lauper					2nd / Top 3
Top 4	Mon amie la rose	Françoise Hardy					2nd / Top 3
Top 3	Ma révérence	Véronique Sanson					1st / Top 2
Top 3	Perhaps, Perhaps, Perhaps	Doris Day					1st / Top 2
Top 3	Mon Coeur, mon Amour	Anaïs					1st / Top 2
Finale	Crazy	Gnarls Barkley					2nd / Runner-Up
Finale	I Don't Know	Noa					2nd / Runner-Up
Finale	Fais-moi une place	Julien Clerc					2nd / Runner-Up

=== Camélia-Jordana ===
Camélia Jordana - 16 years old, auditioned in Marseille.

	Song(s)	Original Artist(s)	Jury Vote				Callout / Result
	Song(s)	Original Artist(s)	Manœuvre	Manoukian	Lio	Sinclair	Callout / Result
Top 15	Quelqu'un ma dit	Carla Bruni					2nd / Top 10
Top 10	Heart Of Glass	Blondie					6th / Top 9
Top 9	I Wanna Be Loved By You	Marilyn Monroe					3rd / Top 8
Top 8	Womanizer	Britney Spears					3rd / Top 7
Top 7	Le Coup de Soleil	Richard Cocciante				Absent	4th / Top 6
Top 6	Anyone Else But You	The Moldy Peaches					1st / Top 5
Top 6	Que reste-t-il de nos amours ?	Charles Trenet					1st / Top 5
Top 5	Ton invitation	Louise Attaque					2nd / Top 4
Top 5	Back to Black	Amy Winehouse					2nd / Top 4
Top 4	Killing Me Softly With His Song	Roberta Flack / The Fugees					3rd / Bottom 2
Top 4	La Madrague	Brigitte Bardot					3rd / Bottom 2
Top 3	Foundations	Kate Nash					3rd / Eliminated
Top 3	Mistral gagnant	Renaud					3rd / Eliminated
Top 3	Paint It Black	Rolling Stones					3rd / Eliminated

=== Thomas Bonneau ===
Thomas Bonneau - 17 years old, auditioned in Toulouse.

	Song(s)	Original Artist(s)	Jury Vote				Callout / Result
	Song(s)	Original Artist(s)	Manœuvre	Manoukian	Lio	Sinclair	Callout / Result
Top 15	Tatoue Moi	Opéra Rock Mozart					8th / Top 10
Top 10	Dans La Maison Vide	Michel Polnareff					8th / Bottom 3
Top 9	Onde Sensuelle	Matthieu Chedid					8th / Bottom 2
Top 8	Maniac	Michael Sembello					4th / Top 7
Top 7	Tu m'oublieras	Régine / Larusso				Absent	6th / Bottom 2
Top 6	Four to the Floor	Starsailor					3rd / Top 5
Top 6	Ce n'est rien	Julien Clerc					3rd / Top 5
Top 5	Ça plane pour moi	Plastic Bertrand					3rd / Bottom 3
Top 5	Love Today	Mika					3rd / Bottom 3
Top 4	New York avec toi	Téléphone					4th / Eliminated
Top 4	Starman	David Bowie					4th / Eliminated

=== Dalé ===
Dalé - 24 years old, auditioned in Lyon.

	Song(s)	Original Artist(s)	Jury Vote				Callout / Result
	Song(s)	Original Artist(s)	Manœuvre	Manoukian	Lio	Sinclair	Callout / Result
Top 15	I've Been Loving You Too Long	Otis Redding					1st / Top 10
Top 10	You Are So Beautiful	Joe Cocker					5th / Top 9
Top 9	Toi et le soleil	Claude François					4th / Top 8
Top 8	What'd I Say	Ray Charles					1st / Top 7
Top 7	Je suis venu te dire que je m'en vais	Serge Gainsbourg				Absent	5th / Bottom 3
Top 6	Toute la musique que j'aime	Johnny Hallyday					4th / Bottom 3
Top 6	Sympathy For The Devil	The Rolling Stones					4th / Bottom 3
Top 5	Mon paradis	Christophe Maé					5th / Eliminated
Top 5	On Broadway	George Benson					5th / Eliminated

=== Damien Vanni ===
Damien Vanni - 29 years old, auditioned in Lyon.

	Song(s)	Original Artist(s)	Jury Vote				Callout / Result
	Song(s)	Original Artist(s)	Manœuvre	Manoukian	Lio	Sinclair	Callout / Result
Top 15	Wicked Game	Chris Isaak					3rd / Top 10
Top 10	L'Autre Finistère	Les Innocents					4th / Top 9
Top 9	Everybody's Got To Learn Sometimes	The Korgis					1st / Top 8
Top 8	Elle a les yeux revolver	Marc Lavoine					5th / Top 7
Top 7	Wonderwall	Oasis				Absent	3rd / Top 6
Top 6	Le Premier Jour (du reste de ta vie)	Étienne Daho					6th / Eliminated
Top 6	No Woman No Cry	Bob Marley					6th / Eliminated

=== Lary Lambert ===
Lary Lambert - 20 years old, auditioned in Paris.

	Song(s)	Original Artist(s)	Jury Vote				Callout / Result
	Song(s)	Original Artist(s)	Manœuvre	Manoukian	Lio	Sinclair	Callout / Result
Top 15	Si Seulement Je Pouvais Lui Manquer	Calogero					Saved / Bottom 6
Top 10	You Give Me Something	James Morrison					7th / Top 9
Top 9	I'm Not In Love	10 CC					2nd / Top 8
Top 8	L'Encre de tes yeux	Francis Cabrel					6th / Bottom 3
Top 7	I Heard It Through The Grapevine	Marvin Gaye				Absent	7th / Eliminated

=== Mahdi Jaggae ===
Mahdi Jaggae - 27 years old, auditioned in Marseille.

	Song(s)	Original Artist(s)	Jury Vote				Callout / Result
	Song(s)	Original Artist(s)	Manœuvre	Manoukian	Lio	Sinclair	Callout / Result
Top 15	I'm Yours	Jason Mraz					4th / Top 10
Top 10	Pastime Paradise	Stevie Wonder					1st / Top 9
Top 9	Aïcha	Khaled					6th / Top 8
Top 8	Always On The Run	Lenny Kravitz					8th / Eliminated

=== Mélissa Reffas ===
Mélissa Reffas - 18 years old, auditioned in Lille.

	Song(s)	Original Artist(s)	Jury Vote				Callout / Result
	Song(s)	Original Artist(s)	Manœuvre	Manoukian	Lio	Sinclair	Callout / Result
Top 15	I'm Outta Love	Anastasia					7th / Top 10
Top 10	Mamy Blue	Nicoletta					2nd / Top 9
Top 9	I'm So Excited	The Pointer Sisters					9th / Eliminated

=== Yoann Pigny ===
Yoann Pigny - 21 years old, auditioned in Paris.

	Song(s)	Original Artist(s)	Jury Vote				Callout / Result
	Song(s)	Original Artist(s)	Manœuvre	Manoukian	Lio	Sinclair	Callout / Result
Top 15	Cargo	Axel Bauer					9th / Top 10
Top 10	Les Voisines	Renan Luce					10th / Eliminated

== Elimination chart ==
Females	Males	Top 25	Top 13	Wild Card	Winner

Safe	Safe First	Safe Last	Eliminated	Top 15 Save

Stage:		Semi-Finals	Finals								
Week:		4/7	4/14	4/21	4/28	5/5	5/12	5/19	5/26	6/2	6/9
Place	Contestant	Result									
1	Soan Faya	6th	3rd	5th	1st	1st	2nd	Bottom 2	1st	Bottom 2	Winner
2	Leïla Aissaoui	5th	Bottom 2	7th	Bottom 2	2nd	Bottom 2	1st	2nd	1st	Runner-Up
3	Camélia Jordana	2nd	6th	3rd	3rd	4th	1st	2nd	Bottom 2	Elim	
4	Thomas Bonneau	8th	8th	Bottom 2	4th	Bottom 2	3rd	3rd	Elim		
5	Dalé	1st	5th	4th	1st	5th	4th	Elim			
6	Damien Vanni	3rd	4th	1st	5th	3rd	Elim				
7	Lary Lambert	Saved	7th	2nd	6th	Elim					
8	Mahdi Jaggae	4th	1st	6th	Elim						
9	Mélissa Reffas	7th	2nd	Elim							
10	Yoann Pigny	9th	Elim								
11–15	Antoine Vignette	Elim									
11–15	Charlotte Robin	Elim									
11–15	Maria Paz	Elim									
11–15	Mickaël Frémeaux	Elim									
11–15	Yasmina	Elim									
