= Soan (singer) =

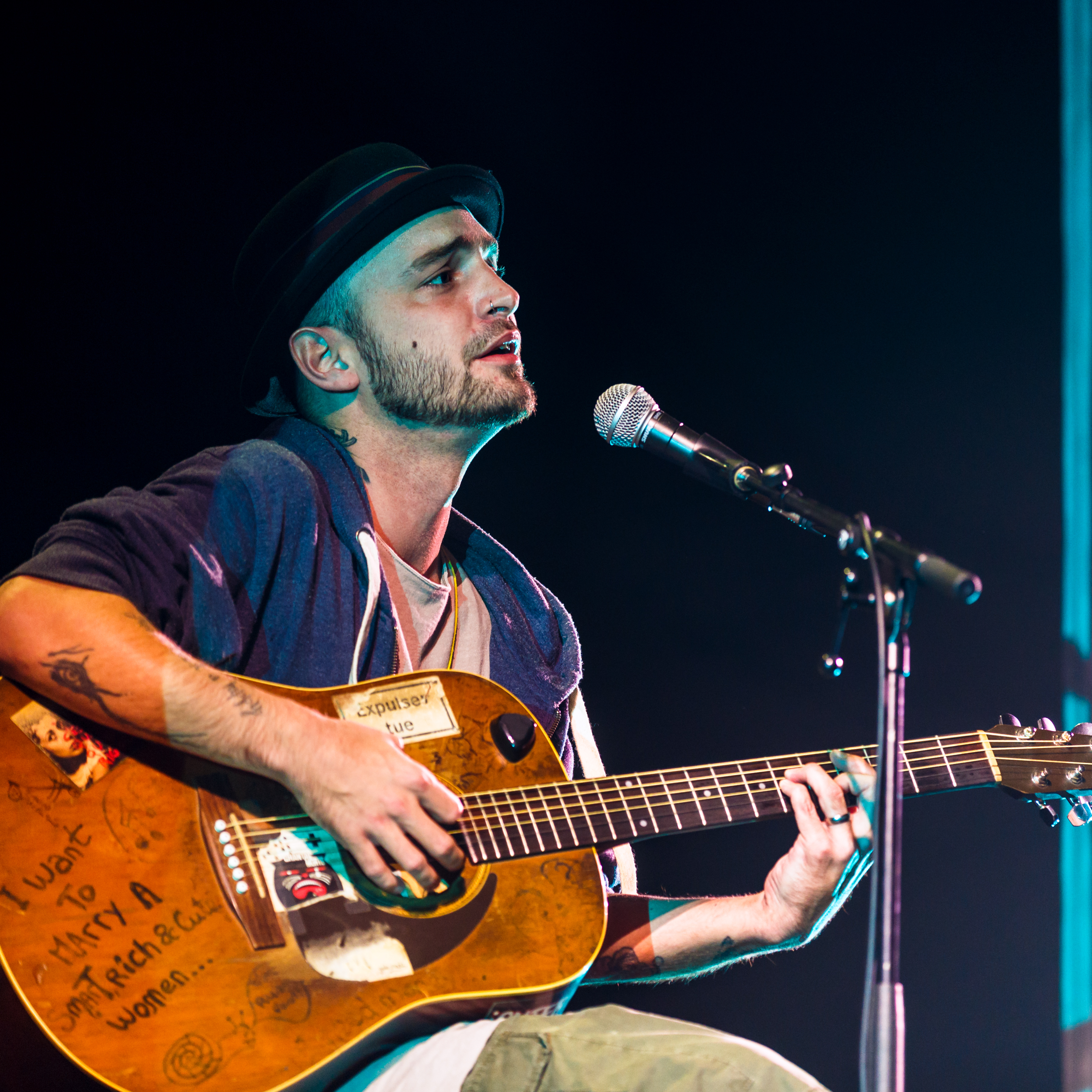

Background information
- Born: Julien Decroix; 4 May 1981 (age 45)
- Origin: France
- Genres: Pop
- Occupations: Singer, songwriter, Record Producer, musician
- Instruments: Vocals, Guitar
- Years active: 1998 – present

Julien Decroix, better known as Soan, (born on 4 May 1981) is a French singer-songwriter who won in 2009 the seventh season of the French music competition Nouvelle Star.

== Beginnings ==
Soan left home at 17 over family discords and traveled a lot as a singer to earn his living but without notable success. He also sang at Paris Metro underground train stations.

== Nouvelle Star ==
At 27, he took part in the Paris auditions of Nouvelle Star (French version of Idol) and was accepted to qualification rounds, without his audition being shown on the program. His rendition in the second round was also not shown. His first showing on the broadcast series was while doing a trio interpretation of BB Brunes's Dis-moi with two other candidates after which went to the lives rounds. On the show of 31 March 2009 on M6, judge Philippe Manœuvre announced his selection for the prime shows with 15 finalists left.

On 9 June 2009, he was declared the winner against tough competition from finalist and eventual runner-up Leïla Aissaoui as well as from third Camélia Jordana. He proved to be a phenomenon with his piercings and tattoos, pretty face, smoky eye makeup (l'oeil de biche), deep baritone voice and unique sense of fashion. Jean Paul Gaultier designed several of Soan's costumes and outfits.

=== Appearances during Nouvelle Star ===
Solo

Date	Title	Original artist	Marks
7 April 2009	"Le vent nous portera"	Noir désir	4 blues
14 April 2009	"Ma petite entreprise"	Alain Bashung	4 blues
21 April 2009	"Boys Don't Cry"	The Cure	3 blues
28 April 2008	"Les mots bleus"	Christophe	4 blues
5 May 2009	"Alabama Song" (The Doors version)	Kurt Weill	3 blues (on 3)
12 May 2009	"Requiem pour un con"	Serge Gainsbourg	2 blues
12 May 2009	My Way (Sid Vicious version)	Paul Anka	4 blues
19 May 2009	"Seven Nation Army"	The White Stripes	3 blues
19 May 2009	"Ces gens-là"	Jacques Brel	3 blues
26 May 2009	"La Mauvaise Réputation" (Sinsemilia version)	Georges Brassens	4 blues
26 May 2009	"One"	U2	2 blues
2 June 2009 (semi-finals)	"Poupée de cire, poupée de son" (Wizo version)	France Gall	1 blue
2 June 2009 (semi-finals)	"L'Accordéoniste"	Édith Piaf	2 blues
2 June 2009 (semi-finals)	"Personal Jesus" (Johnny Cash version)	Depeche Mode	3 blues
9 June 2009 (finals)	"J'veux du soleil"	Au P'tit Bonheur	4 blues
9 June 2009 (finals)	"Aux sombres héros de l'amer"	Noir Desir	2 blues
9 June 2009 (finals)	"Break on Through (To the Other Side)"	The Doors	3 blues

In duos / trios

Date	Title	Fellow contestants in duo / trio	Original artist
2nd day in theater	"Dis-moi"	Yoann and Théophane	BB Brunes
7 April 2009	"Temps à nouveau"	Yasmina, Yoann, Mahdi and Thomas	Jean-Louis Aubert
14 April 2009	"Tout le bonheur du monde"	Camélia Jordana and Mahdi	Sinsemilia
21 April 2009	"Tu veux ou tu veux pas"	Camélia Jordana and Lary	Marcel Zanini
28 April 2009	"Mes mains sur tes hanches"	Leïla	Salvatore Adamo
5 May 2009	"Est-ce que tu viens pour les vacances?"	Damien	David et Jonathan
19 May 2009	"Spacer"	Leïla and Thomas	Sheila
26 May 2009	"Mon frère"	Thomas	Maxime Le Forestier
26 May 2009	"I Got You (I Feel Good)"	Camélia Jordana	James Brown
2 June 2009	"Les histoires d'A"	Leïla	Les Rita Mitsouko
2 June 2009	"Walk on the Wild Side	Camélia-Jordana	Lou Reed
9 June 2009	"Should I Stay or Should I Go"	Leïla	The Clash
9 June 2009	"Here's to You"	Leïla	Joan Baez
9 June 2009	"Comment te dire adieu?"	Leïla	Françoise Hardy

In groups

Group interpretations including Soan at the beginning of program

Date	Title	Original artist
21 April 2009	"I Want You Back"	The Jackson Five
28 April 2008	"Born to Be Alive"	Patrick Hernandez
5 May 2009	"Wake Me Up Before You Go-Go"	George Michael
12 May 2009	"Everybody Needs Somebody to Love" (The Blues Brothers version)	Solomon Burke
19 May 2009	"Waterloo"	ABBA
26 May 2009	"Another One Bites the Dust"	Queen
2 June 2009	"London Calling"	The Clash
9 June 2009	"YMCA"	Village People

== After Nouvelle Star ==
On 22 June 2009, he was featured as supporting act before a Jean Corti concert at Théâtre des Bouffes du Nord, in Paris, and between June and October 2009 took part in the Nouvelle Star 2009 Tour with 4 other finalists.

His debut album, Tant pis was released on 27 November 2009 on Jive Records. On 9 June 2010, he was invited to interpret one of his songs, "Séquelles", during the Nouvelle Star 2010 semi-finals. He also appeared at Laurent Ruquier's program On n'est pas couché.

== Discography ==
=== Albums ===
Year	Title	Peak positions			Notes
Year	Title	FR	FR Download	BEL (Wa)	Notes
2009	...tant pis	52	27	79	Track list: 1. Next Time (2:55); 2. Sequelles (3:37); 3. En chemin (3:10); 4. The Storm (3:28); 5. Putain de ballerine (3:06); 6. Pas pour lui (5:04); 7. Puisque rien (3:35); 8. Emily (2:52); 9. Parisiennes (3:03); 10. Ethylotent (3:20); 11. Monster (3:36); 12. Belleville (3:58)
2012	Sous les yeux de Sophie	22	23	91	Track list: 1. "S'il y a du monde" (feat. Christian Olivier) (3:48); 2. "Pas peur du ciel" (3:49); 3. "À tire-d'aile" (feat. Melissmel) (2:54); 4. "Paris" (3:28); 5. "Drosophyle" (3:46); 6. "Les z'anges" (3:09); 7. "1 heure de plus" (2:58); 8. "Pour de bon" (2:27); 9. "De mémoire d'enfant" (2:56); 10. "C'est pour ça" (2:55); 11. "Inch alleluia" (2:51); 12. "Make Me Sober" (3:34); 13. "Dam Didam" (2:42); 14. "Je reste" (3:53)
2013	Sens interdits	35	—	80	Track list: 1. "No pasa nada" (Intro) (0:38); 2. "No pasa nada" (3:08); 3. "Rêver d'en haut" (3:24); 4. "Me laisse pas seul" (with la Demoiselle Inconnue) (3:42); 5. "Regarde-moi" (3:07); 6. "J'ai deux amours" (0:08); 7. "Il ne se passe rien" (2:48); 8. "Psycho Cinderella" (2:35); 9. "Sens interdits" (with Rachid Taha) (3:35); 10. "Bobo" (2:25); 11. "Elsa" (3:21); 12. "Conquistador" (3:40)
2016	Retourné vivre	39	—	104	Track list: 1. "Quand je serai" (3:09); 2. "Coco" (with Djazia Satour) (4:08); 3. "Pustule" (2:48); 4. "Anaïs" (3:48); 5. "La chute" (3:09); 6. "Fakir" (3:05); 7. "Un verre sur deux" (2:43); 8. "À la fin" (2:44); 9. "Adonaïe" (4:33); 10. "Petit cadeau" (with Djazia Satour) (3:19); 11. "Colocation" (2:32); 12. "À côté" (3:06); 13. "Bouche bée" (3:26); 14. "Eyahé" (4:08); 15. "Seven Glories" (with Djazia Satour) (3:11)
2017	Celui qui aboie	103	—	149	Track list: 1. "Ces lumières" 2. "Celui qui aboie" 3. "Vingt cinq printemps" 4. "Agata"; 5. "La liberté" 6. "Même loin" 7. "L'inattendue"; 8. "Chapeau de paille" 9. "The hurricane" 10. "Wendy"; 11. "Cinq heures" 12. "Le chat" 13. "Les malentendus"
2019	10 ans de cavale: Best Of	69	—	—	Track list: 1. "Mort à ce monde" 2. "Jupiter"; 3. "À tire d'ailes" 4. "Séquelles"; 5. "De mémoire d'enfant" 6. "Dam didam" 7. "Il ne se passe rien" 8. "Bo Poncho"; 9. "Parisiennes"; 10. "Pacifier" (with Baptiste Ventadour); 11. "La belle de Cadix" (part 1); 12. "Drosophile"; 13. "Erratum"; 14. "La belle de Cadix" (part 2); 15. "À la fin" 16. "Emily"; 17. "Les malentendus" 18. "First chicken" 19. "À l'ancienne" (with Tryo); 20. "Fée Clochette"; 21. "Paris"; 22. "Putain de ballerine" 23. "Petit cadeau"

=== Singles ===
- 2009: "Next time"
- 2010: "Emily"
- 2010: "Séquelles"
