= Benjamin Siksou =

French singer-songwriter and actor (born 1987)

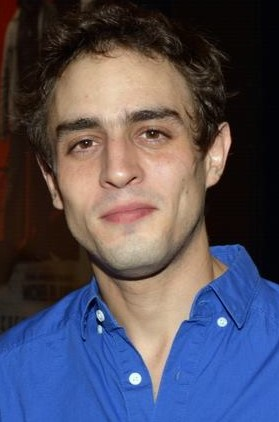
- Benjamin Siksou in 2016
- Born: 8 February 1987 (age 38); Paris, France
- Occupation(s): Singer-songwriter, actor
- Years active: 2008–present

Benjamin Siksou (born 8 February 1987) is a French singer-songwriter and actor. He sings in a "jazz blues" style and plays the guitar, piano, and the violin.

== Early years ==
Benjamin Siksou was born to a visual-artist mother and media consultant father. This precocious musician grew up between the thirteenth and the sixth arrondissement of Paris. He began taking violin and tennis classes in 1989 at the age of two and a half years, but in 2000 a knee injury prevented him from realizing his childhood dream of becoming a professional tennis player.

After the injury, Benjamin devoted himself entirely to his other passion of music, and in 2002 he started to write and compose his first songs. He also joined a band with some of his friends from his college and, beginning in 2005, performed in Parisian jazz bars such as the Caveau des Oubliettes, the Melody Blues, the Swan Bar, and the café Le Charteux. At the time Benjamin was taking influences from songs such as "Billie Jean", "Hallelujah", "Just the Two of Us", and "Summertime", and was already playing his own compositions like "Just know that I knew", "On the Ground", "Work Another Day", and "Ma muse mon égérie".

In 2007, now studying in his second year of art history, Benjamin decided to interrupt his studies to dedicate himself to music, and obtained his first roles in the film industry in the same year.

Some of the musicians that have influenced Siksou are: John Lee Hooker, Aretha Franklin, James Brown, Stevie Wonder, Donny Hathaway, Jeff Buckley, Ella Fitzgerald, Alain Bashung, Lauryn Hill, John Coltrane, and James Chance.

== Nouvelle Star ==
Siksou appeared on the 6th season of the French reality singing competition show Nouvelle Star in 2008. His time on the show began at the Paris casting on 27 February 2008, where Philippe Manœuvre called him a "rough diamond" (French: diamant brut) after he performed a cover of "Just the Two of Us" by Bill Withers and was unanimously supported. His jazzy style stood out on the show. However, a jury strongly believing in him along with a public voting greatly in his favor helped to elect him each week by a large majority for his 19 performances. This great support over more than three months carried him to the show finale at the Pavillon Baltard on 11 June 2008.

His time on Nouvelle Star brought him to fame, sending over 4.6 million hits to Benjamin's MySpace page since February 2008. The official Facebook page for Benjamin Siksou has accumulated 110,000 members.

== Discography ==
=== Single ===
"My Eternity", Benjamin's first single, realized by Vincent Ségal, was released in France on 9 February 2009. It was distributed by Believe Digital and produced by Derrière les planches / Temps d'Eté, and is only available for purchase in online music stores.

The music video for "My Eternity", directed by Christophe Charrier, was presented on 9 April 2009 in Le Grand Journal de C+.

=== EP ===
Instantanés du 11 April 2009, Siksou's first EP, was released in France on 22 June 2009. The album, distributed by Believe Digital and produced by Derrière les planches / Temps d'Eté, is only available for purchase in online music stores and for streaming on Deezer.

The EP contains five songs recorded live at the Café de la danse in Paris on 11 April 2009 and mixed by Olivier Lude. The album also includes two versions of the single My Eternity.

==== Track list ====
- "Décor" – 4'37 – Live au Café de la Danse (Benjamin Siksou)
- "Avant de m'endormir" – 3'41 – Live au Café de la Danse (Benjamin Siksou)
- "Just the Two of Us" – 2'38 – Live au Café de la Danse (Bill Withers/Grover Washington, Jr.)
- "Madame rêve" – 6'45 – Live au Café de la Danse (Pierre Grillet / Alain Bashung)
- "Just Know That I Knew" – 4'28 – Live au Café de la Danse (Benjamin Siksou)
- "My Eternity" – 3'08 – 1ère maquette (Benjamin Siksou / Hugh Coltman)
- "My Eternity" – 3'08 – Version studio (Benjamin Siksou / Hugh Coltman)

=== So in Love ===
The album So in Love by André Manoukian, produced by Enzo Productions and distributed by Capitol EMI, debuted in April 2010. It contained 14 classic jazz titles adapted and performed by new artists, accompanied by Manoukian's piano music. Siksou sang two of the songs in the album: a solo "I Fall in Love Too Easily" and a duo "Lullaby of Birdland" with China Moses.

== Performances ==
=== Touring ===
Siksou's EP was the result of his first French tour. Organized by Auguri Productions, this tour was sold out from its debut in April 2009 to its finish in June. The tour passed through Dijon at La Vapeur, Angers at Chabada, Clermont-Ferrand at Coopérative de Mai, Bordeaux at Rock School Barbey, Marseille at Espace Julien, Lyon at Ninkasi Kao, Lille at Splendid, and Paris at Café de la Danse for two concerts on 10 and 11 April 2009.

== Selected filmography ==
| Year | Title | Role | Notes |
|---|---|---|---|
| 2008 | 15 ans et demi | Gaspard | |
| 2013 | Blue Is the Warmest Colour | Antoine | |
| 2014 | Une histoire banale | The man in the washroom | |
| 2015 | The Art Dealer | Jean | |
| 2015 | Jailbirds | Adrien Leroy | |
