= Nouvelle Star season 11 =

Nouvelle Star
- Season 11
- Hosted by: Benjamin Castaldi; Laure Falesse (After)
- Judges: André Manoukian, Sinclair, Élodie Frégé and Yarol Poupaud
- Winner: Emji
- Runner-up: Mathieu Kolanek

Release
- Original release: Invalid date range

Season chronology
- ← Previous; Season 10

The eleventh season of Nouvelle Star began on November 27, 2014, and finished on March 12, 2015. Cyril Hanouna was renewed as host for a third season. Two of the judges from season 10 stayed for season 11, namely André Manoukian and Sinclair, whereas judges Olivier Bas and Maurane were replaced by Élodie Frégé and Yarol Poupaud. Previous season 9 and 10 host Cyril Hanouna quit the show, and was replaced by Benjamin Castaldi, the historic presenter of the show in its first four seasons on M6, with Castaldi leaving TF1 to join D8.

Season winner was Emji.
