= Nouvelle Star season 10 =

Nouvelle Star
- Season 10
- Hosted by: Cyril Hanouna; Enora Malagré (Nouvelle Star, ça continue)
- Judges: André Manoukian, Olivier Bas, Sinclair, Maurane
- Winner: Mathieu Saikaly
- Runner-up: Yseult Onguenet

Release
- Original release: October 31, 2013 – February 20, 2014

Season chronology
- ← Previous; Season 9 Next → Season 11

The tenth season of Nouvelle Star began on October 31, 2013, and finished on February 20, 2014. Cyril Hanouna was renewed as host for a second season. All four judges from season 9 stayed for season 10, namely André Manoukian, Olivier Bas, Sinclair and Maurane.

Auditions were held in Marseille, Lyon and Paris. The winner was Mathieu Saikaly.

== Changes in format ==
After the number of contestants for prime shows had been reduced in season 9, the total number of contestants was returned to 15 finalists. At the end, actually 16 were chosen to the finals based on auditions.

Starting with second series of prime shows, another change was introduced. Two candidates would be eliminated by public vote, but the judges would be given the opportunity to save one of the Bottom 4 to move on to the next round.

Starting with the advanced primes from 2 January 2014 onwards, the viewers were given the choice to vote by colour online, thus giving them more power, making them effectively a "fifth judge alongside the four regular judges of the series.

For the shows on 17, 24 and 31 January, the viewers could vote online through the official website of the show to decide which song the remaining contestants would reinterprete a second time from their repertoire of initial performances including their audition song.

== Finalists ==
- Mathieu Saikaly - Winner
- Yseult Onguenet (20) - Runner-up
- Pauline de Tarragon (17)
- Alvaro Echánove (21)
- Dana Ali-Ahmad (25)
- Sirine Betton (18)
- Mehdi Dahmane (26)
- Claudia Chu (16)
- Léopoldine Hummel (28)
- Hugo Chalan-Marchio (16)
- Kimberly Kitson (23)
- Julie Dessoude (18)
- Chehinaze (21)
- Ezra Van Vliet (20)
- Laura Migné (20)
- Marc Touati (21)

== Elimination chart ==
Legend
Female	Male	Top 10	Eliminated	Eliminated by the judges

Stage:		Finals						
Week:		1/9	1/16	1/23	1/30	2/6	2/13	2/20
Place	Contestant	Result						
1	Mathieu Saikaly							Winner
2	Yseult Onguenet							Runner-Up
3	Pauline de Tarragon						Elim	
3	Alvaro Echánove					Elim		
