= Nouvelle Star season 8 =

Nouvelle Star
- Season 8
- Hosted by: Virginie Guilhaume
- Judges: André Manoukian, Philippe Manœuvre, Lio, Marco Prince
- Winner: Lucie Brunet
- Runner-up: François Raoult

Release
- Original release: March 2 – June 16, 2010

Season chronology
- ← Previous; Season 7 Next → Season 9

The eighth season of Nouvelle Star began on March 2 and finished on June 16. Virginie Guilhaume returned as the host for her sophomore season. André Manoukian remained as the only original jury member after eight years along Philippe Manœuvre and Lio. After one season Sinclair decided to leave and was replaced by former FFF-member Marco Prince because of, according to fellow judge Lio, personal dissatisfaction in the Nouvelle Star-experience for Sinclair.

Auditions were held in the following cities:

- Marseille
- Toulouse
- Lyon
- Strasbourg
- Brussels
- Paris

After the auditions were over the top 124 were cut down in the Trianon Theater to 15 who eventually competed in the first liveshow aiming to advance to the final group of ten.

== Contestants ==
Top 10 Finalists

- Luce Brunet (20) - Winner
- François Raoult (25) - Runner-up
- Ramón Mirabet (25)
- Lussi Lebrun (27)
- Benjamin Boehm (16)
- Dave Mgy (28)
- Annabelle (20)
- Stéphanie Vondenhoff (29)
- Sacha Page (19)
- Marine Maiwa (26)

Marine selected as the 10th finalist by the jury.

Semifinalists (Top 15)

- Ambre Dupont (23)
- Anna Torné (18)
- Lucia de Carvalho (29)
- Manon Trinquier (19)
- Siegfried Martin-Diaz (27)

Eliminations - Top 10

Date	Theme	Bottom Three
21 April		Marine Maiwa	Annabelle	Dave Mgy
28 April		Sascha Page	Stéphanie Vondenhoff	Ramón Miarbet
5 May		Stéphanie Vondenhoff (2)	Dave Mgy (2)	Ramón Miarbet (2)
13 May		Annabelle (2)	Lussi Lebrun
19 May		Dave Mgy (3)	François Raoult	Lussi Lebrun (2)
26 May		Benjamin Boehm	Ramón Mirabet (3)	Lussi Lebrun (3)
		Bottom Two
2 June	Quarterfinal	Lussi Lebrun (4)	François Raoult (2)
9 June	Semifinal	Ramón Mirabet (4)	François Raoult (2)
16 June	Final	François Raoult (3)	Luce Brunet

== Elimination chart ==
Legend
Female	Male	Top 10	Top 15

Stage:		Top 15	Finals								
Week:		4/14	4/21	4/28	5/5	5/13	5/19	5/26	6/2	6/9	6/16
Place	Contestant	Result									
1	Lucie Brunet	Viewers									Winner
2	François Raoult	Viewers					Btm 2		Btm 2	Btm 2	Runner-Up
3	Ramon Mirabet	Viewers						Btm 2		Elim	
4	Lussi Lebrun	Viewers				Btm 2			Elim		
5	Benjamin Boehm	Viewers						Elim			
6	Dave Mgy	Viewers			Btm 2		Elim				
7	Annabelle	Viewers	Btm 2			Elim					
8	Stéphanie Vondenhoff	Viewers		Btm 2	Elim						
9	Sacha Page	Viewers		Elim							
10	Marine Maiwa	Judges	Elim								
11-15	Ambre	Elim									
11-15	Lucia De Carvalho	Elim									
11-15	Anna Keane	Elim									
11-15	Manon Trinquier	Elim									
11-15	Siegfried Desieg-Dezart	Elim									
