= Nouvelle Star season 9 =

Nouvelle Star
- Season 9
- Hosted by: Cyril Hanouna
- Judges: André Manoukian, Olivier Bas, Sinclair, Maurane
- Winner: Sophie-Tith Charvet
- Runner-up: Florian Bertonnier

Release
- Original release: December 11, 2012 – February 26, 2013

Season chronology
- ← Previous; Season 8 Next → Season 10

The ninth season of Nouvelle Star began on December 11, 2012 and finished on February 26, 2013. Virginie Guilhaume was replaced by Cyril Hanouna. André Manoukian remained as the only original jury member after nine years. Sinclair, Maurane and Olivier Bas joined Manoukian as judges for the season.

Auditions were held in Marseille, Lyon and Paris. After the auditions were over the top 100 were cut down in the Trianon Theater to ten without resorting to semi-finals.

== Contestants ==
Top 10 Finalists

- Sophie-Tith Charvet (16) – Winner
- Florian Bertonnier (19) – Runner-up
- Philippe Krier (24)
- Florian Devos aka. Flo" (20)
- Julie Obré (25)
- Paul Kay (18)
- Timothée Rossignol (25)
- Charlotte Morgane Berry (24)
- Adélaïde Pratoussy (20)
- Léa Layne (18)

No semifinalist for this season, all were directly selected before the first prime.

Eliminations - Top 10

Date	Theme	Bottom Three
15 January		Léa Layne (jury)	Adélaïde Pratoussy (jury)	Charlotte Morgane Berry
22 January		Timothée Rossignol	Julie Obré
29 January		Paul Kay	Philippe Krier	Flo Devos
5 February		Julie Obré (2)	Flo Devos (2)	Florian Bertonnier
		Final round
12 February	Quarterfinal	Flo Devos
19 February	Semifinal	Philippe Krier
26 February	Final	Florian Bertonnier	Sophie-Tith Charvet

== Elimination chart ==
Legend
Female	Male	Top 10	Eliminated	Eliminated by the judges

Stage:		Finals						
Week:		1/15	1/22	1/29	2/5	2/12	2/19	2/26
Place	Contestant	Result						
1	Sophie-Tith Charvet							Winner
2	Florian Bertonnier				Btm 3			Runner-Up
3	Philippe Krier			Btm 2			Elim	
4	Florian Devos (aka. Flo)			Btm 3	Btm 2	Elim		
5	Julie Obré		Btm 2		Elim			
6	Paul Kay			Elim				
7	Timothée Rossignol		Elim					
8	Charlotte Morgane Berry	Elim						
9-10	Adélaïde Pratoussy	Elim						
9-10	Léa Layne	Elim						
