= BB Brunes =

French rock band

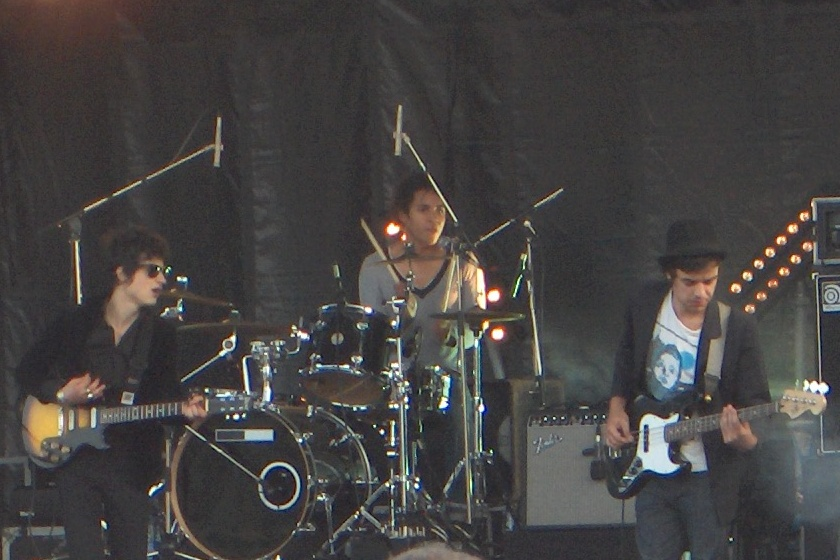
- The band at the Festival des Terre-Neuvas in 2007

Background information
- Origin: Paris, France
- Genres: Pop rock, garage rock revival
- Years active: 2006–2014, 2017–present
- Labels: Warner Music, Elektra France
- Members: Adrien Gallo; Karim Réveillé; Félix Hemmen; Bérald Crambes

BB Brunes (French pronunciation: [be be bʁyn]) is a French pop rock band.

In 2000, Adrien Gallo, Karim Réveillé and Raphaël Delorme, childhood friends, formed the band "Hangover" with songs exclusively in English.

Some years later, Raphaël left the band while they were negociating their first contract. Félix Hemmen, who enjoyed their music, joined the band’s lineup followed by bassist Bérald Crambes in 2007.

In 2005 they participated in the Emergenza music festival in Paris and were able to reach the final.

The band took on the name BB Brunes, inspired by Serge Gainsbourg’s “Initials B.B.” and by Paris's boulevard Brune, where the band’s rehearsals then took place. Their musical influences are punk and rock artists from the 1960s and 1970s as well as current bands such as The Strokes, Amy Winehouse, The Clash, David Bowie, Ray Charles and singers like Serge Gainsbourg, Jacques Dutronc, Herbert Léonard, etc. Their lyrics are mostly in French.

In 2009, the group won a Victoires de la musique in the category 'Stage band revelation of the year'. They went on hiatus in 2014, Gallo released his debut solo album that year and they reunited in 2017 when they released their fourth studio album, Puzzle.

== Members ==
=== Adrien Gallo ===
Adrien Gallo (born 2 July 1989) is the lead vocalist of the band. He is a singer, songwriter and an actor. He is son of Jean-Pierre Gallo, director, producer and scriptwriter for French television and of Latifa Benaoudia of Algerian origin.

He has also recorded solo and wrote a number of songs, notably for the French musical comedy Dracula, l'amour plus fort que la mort notably En transe...ylvanie interpreted by Gregory Deck. He has also written Boxing Club for Alizée and Mi amor and La Marée for Vanessa Paradis and Playground and Exit for singer Sophie-Tith after her appearance in season 9 of Nouvelle Star in France. In 2014 he released his début album Gemini, in collaboration with Ella Waldmann, a friend since 2007. Monokini and Crocodile were promoted as singles from the album.

He has appeared in a number of films and French television series:

- 2001: L'Instit as Raphi (TV series)
- 2001: L'Ami Fritz of Jean-Louis Lorenzi (TV film)
- 2002: La Victoire des vaincus as a migrant youth (TV film by Nicolas Picard)
- 2002: Julie Lescaut (TV series)
- 2002: Patron sur mesure as Stanislas (TV film by Stéphane Clavier)
- 2003: Les Enfants de Charlotte as Pierre (TV film by François Luciani)
- 2012: JC comme Jésus Christ as a street fan (film by Jonathan Zaccaï)
- 2012: Astérix et Obélix : Au service de sa Majesté as a bard (film by Laurent Tirard)

=== Karim Réveillé ===
Karim Réveillé (born 14 December 1987 in Paris) is the drummer of the band. He was born to a West Indian father and an Algerian mother. In 2012, he also appeared as a bard in Asterix and Obelix: God Save Britannia (French: Astérix et Obélix: Au service de Sa Majesté)

=== Félix Hemmen ===
Félix Hemmen (born 16 November 1989 in Paris) is the lead guitarist and singer of the band. He started playing the piano at age of 9 and at age 14 picked the guitar. Knowing closely the band members of Hangover started by Adrien Gallo, Karim Réveillé and Raphaël Delorme. When Delorme left as guitarist, Félix Hemmen replaced him as guitarist of the new band BB Brunes. In addition to his membership in the band, he has been part of NoSound, a punk music project with his cousin Jonathan.

=== Bérald Crambes ===
Bérald Crambes (born 5 May 1987 in Saint-Georges-de-Didonne, Charente-Maritime) is the bass player of the band. He joined the band in 2007 after the release of the album Blonde comme moi after he read an announcement on BB Brunes MySpace site for a bass player for the band and was chosen of all applicants.

== Discography ==
=== Albums ===
Year	Title	Chart		
Year	Title	FR	BEL (Wa)	SWI
2007	Blonde comme moi	8	16	-
2009	Nico Teen Love	13	31	-
2012	Long Courrier	10	-	-
2017	Puzzle	22	36	-
2019	Visage	62	-	-

Live albums

- 2011: Nico teen Live (reached #101 in SNEP French Singles Charts)

=== EPs ===
- 2010: BB Brunes EP (English EP)

=== Singles ===
Year	Title	Chart			Album
Year	Title	FR	BEL (Wa)	SWI	Album
2007	"Le Gang"	-	-	-	Blonde comme moi
2007	"Dis-moi"	-	21	55	Blonde comme moi
2008	"Houna (Toutes mes copines)"	-	63	-	Blonde comme moi
2008	"Mr Hyde"	-	-	-	Blonde comme moi
2009	"Dynamite"	-	-	-	Nico Teen Love
2009	"Lalalove You"	11	32	-	Nico Teen Love
2010	"Nico Teen Love"	-	-	-	Nico Teen Love
2010	"Britty Boy"	-	-	-	Nico Teen Love
2012	"Coups et blessures"	7	6	-	Long Courrier
2013	"Stéréo"	46	-	-	Long Courrier
2013	"Aficionado"	71	-	-	Long Courrier
2013	"Bye Bye"	149	-	-	Long Courrier
2017	"Eclair Eclair"	116	-	-	

== Music videos ==
- "Le Gang" (2006)
- "Dis-moi" (2007)
- "Lalalove You" (2009)
- "Nico Teen Love" (2010)
- "Britty Boy" (2010)
- "Cul & Chemise"
- "Coups et blessures" (2012)
- "Stéréo" (2012)
- "Aficionado" (2013)
- "Bye Bye" (2013)

" Eclair Eclair " (2017)

" Terrain vague / Pyromane (2017)
