= Nouvelle Star season 3 =

Nouvelle Star
- Season 3
- Hosted by: Benjamin Castaldi
- Judges: André Manoukian; Dove Attia; Marianne James; Manu Katché
- Winner: Myriam Abel
- Runner-up: Pierrick Lilliu

Release
- Original release: February 10 – May 12, 2005

Season chronology
- ← Previous; Season 2 Next → Season 4

The third season of the French television series Nouvelle Star on M6 began on 10 February 2005. On the final broadcast on 12 May 2004, the title was won by Myriam Abel.

All four judges of season 2 returned, being André Manoukian, Dove Attia, Marianne James and Manu Katché. Benjamin Castaldi continued to host the show for a third season.

In the final, Myriam Abel was declared winner by public vote, with Pierrick Lilliu as runner-up.

== Finals ==
=== Finalists ===
(ages stated at time of contest)

Contestant	Age	Hometown	Voted Off	Liveshow Theme
Myriam Abel	23		Winner	Grand Finale
Pierrick Lilliu	18		May 12, 2005	Grand Finale
Roland Carle	29		May 5, 2005	Semi Finale
Mervyn Kennedy-Macfoy	30		April 28, 2005	Viewers' Choice
Francine Massiani	28		April 21, 2005	Love Songs
Dan Perez	16		April 14, 2005	100% French Hits
Sarah Riani	21		April 7, 2005	Disco Hits
Philippe Léger	17		March 31, 2005	Film Hits
Benjamin Delcroix	26		March 24, 2005	Rock Hits
Malik Hemaidi	29		March 16, 2005	100% Hits

=== Live show details ===
==== Pre Live Show (10 March 2005) ====
Artist	Song (original artists)	Result
Benjamin Delcroix	"(Sittin' On) The Dock of the Bay" (Otis Redding)	Safe
Corentine Planckaert	"Un jour ou l'autre" (Isabelle Boulay)	Eliminated
Dan Perez	"7 Days" (Craig David)	Safe
Francine Massiani	"C'est ma prière" (Mike Brant)	Safe
Géraldine	"That Don't Impress Me Much" (Shania Twain)	Eliminated
Gérôme	"Do I Do" (Stevie Wonder)	Eliminated
Malik Hemaidi	"On va s'aimer" (Gilbert Montagné)	Safe
Mervyn Kennedy-Macfoy	"I Want You Back" (The Jackson 5)	Safe
Myriam Abel	"I Have Nothing" (Whitney Houston)	Safe
Philippe Léger	"Si seulement je pouvais lui manquer" (Calogero)	Safe
Pierrick Lilliu	"Dernière danse" (Kyo)	Safe
Rabbia	"Chanter pour ceux qui sont loin de chez eux" (Lââm)	Eliminated
Roland Carle	"Tant pis" (Roch Voisine)	Safe
Sarah Riani	"You Might Need Somebody" (Shola Ama)	Safe
Ségolène	"Don't Know Why" (Norah Jones)	Eliminated

==== Live Show 1 (17 March 2005) ====
Theme: 100% Hits

Artist	Song (original artists)	Result
Benjamin Delcroix	"I Heard It Through the Grapevine" (Marvin Gaye)	Bottom two
Dan Perez	"Parce qu'on vient de loin" (Corneille)	Safe
Francine Massiani	"I Say a Little Prayer" (Aretha Franklin)	Safe
Malik Hemaidi	"Love Me, Please Love Me" (Michel Polnareff)	Eliminated
Mervyn Kennedy-Macfoy	"Give Me the Night" (George Benson)	Safe
Myriam Abel	"Si je m'en sors" (Julie Zenatti)	Bottom three
Philippe Léger	"Chanter" (Florent Pagny)	Safe
Pierrick Lilliu	"Tears in Heaven" (Eric Clapton)	Safe
Roland Carle	"Dites-moi" (Michel Jonasz)	Safe
Sarah Riani	"Tous les cris les SOS" (Daniel Balavoine)	Safe

==== Live Show 2 (24 March 2005) ====
Theme: Rock Hits

Artist	Song (original artists)	Result
Benjamin Delcroix	"Cendrillion" (Téléphone)	Eliminated
Dan Perez	"Save Tonight" (Eagle-Eye Cherry)	Bottom two
Francine Massiani	"Mourir demain" (Natasha St-Pier & Pascal Obispo)	Safe
Mervyn Kennedy-Macfoy	"Wonderwall" (Oasis)	Safe
Myriam Abel	"Left Outside Alone" (Anastacia)	Safe
Philippe Léger	"This Love" (Maroon 5)	Safe
Pierrick Lilliu	"Somewhere Only We Know" (Keane)	Safe
Roland Carle	"Sunday Bloody Sunday" (U2)	Safe
Sarah Riani	"All I Wanna Do" (Sheryl Crow)	Bottom three

==== Live Show 3 (31 March 2005) ====
Theme: Film Hits

Artist	Song (original artists)	Result
Dan Perez	"J'ai tout oublié" (Marc Lavoine & Cristina Marocco)	Safe
Francine Massiani	"Je dois m'en aller" (Niagara)	Safe
Mervyn Kennedy-Macfoy	"L'Aventurier" (Indochine)	Bottom two
Myriam Abel	"I'm So Excited" (The Pointer Sisters)	Safe
Philippe Léger	"You Can't Hurry Love" (Phil Collins)	Eliminated
Pierrick Lilliu	"I'll Be There for You" (The Rembrandts)	Bottom three
Roland Carle	"Can't Stand Losing You" (The Police)	Safe
Sarah Riani	"Street Life" (Randy Crawford)	Safe

==== Live Show 4 (7 April 2005) ====
Theme: Disco Hits

Artist	Song (original artists)	Result
Dan Perez	"You're the First, the Last, My Everything" (Barry White)	Bottom two
Francine Massiani	"Ce n'est rien" (Julien Clerc)	Safe
Mervyn Kennedy-Macfoy	"Don't Go Breaking My Heart" (Elton John & Kiki Dee)	Bottom three
Myriam Abel	"All by Myself" (Celine Dion)	Safe
Pierrick Lilliu	"Le chanteur malheureux" (Claude François)	Safe
Roland Carle	"Quand on arrive en ville" (Daniel Balavoine & Nanette Workman)	Safe
Sarah Riani	"Viens je t'emmène" (France Gall)	Eliminated

==== Live Show 5 (14 April 2005) ====
Theme: 100% French Hits

Artist	Song (original artists)	Result
Dan Perez	"Une seule vie" (Gérald de Palmas)	Eliminated
Francine Massiani	"La foule" (Édith Piaf)	Bottom three
Mervyn Kennedy-Macfoy	"For me... formidable" (Charles Aznavour)	Bottom two
Myriam Abel	"Je te promets" (Johnny Hallyday)	Safe
Pierrick Lilliu	"Jeune et Con" (Damien Saez)	Safe
Roland Carle	"L'envie" (Johnny Hallyday)	Safe
Dan Perez & Pierrick Lilliu	"Les play boys" (Jacques Dutronc)	N/A
Francine Massiani & Mervyn Kennedy-Macfoy	"New York avec toi" (Téléphone)	N/A
Myriam Abel & Roland Carle	"Tu es mon autre" (Lara Fabian & Maurane)	N/A

==== Live Show 6 (21 April 2005) ====
Theme: Love Songs

Artist	First song (original artists)	Second song	Result
Francine Massiani	"Sensualité" (Axelle Red)	"Torn" (Natalie Imbruglia)	Safe
Mervyn Kennedy-Macfoy	"My Baby Just Cares for Me" (Nina Simone)	"J'attendrai" (Claude François)	Bottom two
Myriam Abel	"D'aventures en aventures" (Isabelle Boulay)	"Stop!" (Sam Brown)	Safe
Pierrick Lilliu	"Can't Buy Me Love" (The Beatles)	"L'important c'est d'aimer" (Pascal Obispo)	Safe
Roland Carle	"Femmes, je vous aime" (Julien Clerc)	"Unchain My Heart" (Joe Cocker)	Safe

Artists	Song (original artists)
Francine Massiani, Mervyn Kennedy-Macfoy & Roland Carle	"Besoin d'amour" (France Gall)
Myriam Abel & Pierrick Lilliu	"J'irai où tu iras" (Celine Dion & Jean-Jacques Goldman)

==== Live Show 7 (28 April 2005) ====
Theme: Viewers' Choice

Artist	First song (original artists)	Second song	Result
Mervyn Kennedy-Macfoy	"Seul au monde" (Corneille)	"Sexual Healing" (Marvin Gaye)	Eliminated
Myriam Abel	"Quand on n'a que l'amour" (Jacques Brel)	"Think" (Aretha Franklin)	Safe
Pierrick Lilliu	"La vie ne m'apprend rien" (Daniel Balavoine)	"Wherever You Will Go" (The Calling)	Bottom two
Roland Carle	"Angels" (Robbie Williams)	"Juste une illusion" (Jean-Louis Aubert)	Safe

Artists	Song (original artists)
Mervyn Kennedy-Macfoy & Roland Carle	"Kiss" (Prince)
Myriam Abel & Pierrick Lilliu	"Ti amo" (Umberto Tozzi)

==== Live Show 8: Semi-final (5 May 2005) ====
Artist	First song (original artists)	Second song	Result
Myriam Abel	"If I Ain't Got You" (Alicia Keys)	"Ma philosophie" (Amel Bent)	Safe
Pierrick Lilliu	"Comme d'habitude" (Claude François)	"(I Can't Get No) Satisfaction" (The Rolling Stones)	Safe
Roland Carle	"Cargo" (Axel Bauer)	"Crazy" (Seal)	Eliminated

Artists	Song (original artists)
Myriam Abel & Pierrick Lilliu	"Le chemin" (Kyo feat. Sita)
Pierrick Lilliu & Roland Carle	"Help!" (The Beatles)
Roland Carle & Myriam Abel	"Sous le vent" (Garou & Celine Dion)

==== Live final (12 May 2005) ====
Artist	First song	Second song	Third song	Result
Myriam Abel	"Vivre ou survivre"	"The Greatest Love of All"	"I'm Outta Love"	Winner
Pierrick Lilliu	"Una storia importante"	"How You Remind Me"	"Et un jour, une femme"	Runner-up
