= Laurie Cholewa =

French television and radio host

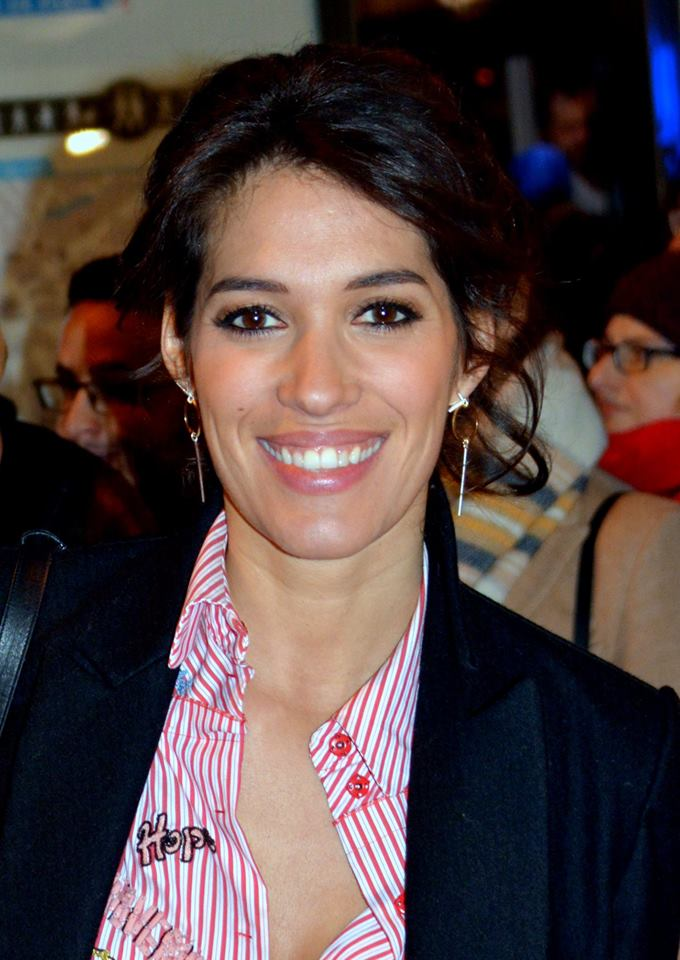
- Born: 25 October 1980 (age 45)
- Occupation: Broadcaster
- Years active: 2001–present

Laurie Cholewa (born 25 October 1980) is a French television and radio host.

== Biography ==
She was born into a family of Polish and Ashkenazi Jewish descent, Cholewa holds a master's degree in Business Law from the Sorbonne.

== Career ==
After debuting on Ciné Cinéma, alongside Laurent Weil, Pierre Zeni and Didier Lupfer, she started on Direct 8 in March 2005. On this emerging channel, she presented the shows TNT Show, Ça tourne and L'École des stars. She is also a columnist in the show Morandini!

In 2010, she joined the France Televisions group, to host of a new variety program, Encore une chanson, the first of which was broadcast live in prime time on France 2 on Saturday, 24 April 2010. During this show, guests were Marc Lavoine, Christophe Maé, Mylène Farmer and Calogero. The principle of the show is simple: each artist interprets two titles. If the public (whose votes are solicited by phone or SMS) asks for more, the artist interprets a third song. The program was canceled due to the low audiences (2.74 million viewers, or 14.1% of the audience). Laurie also presented for several weeks the program entitled In the Universe produced by Alexia Laroche-Joubert. During this show, the host traced the life of a guest in songs.

Following the cancelation of her show, she created her production company PAT productions, and co-produced a prime-time special Abba on France 3 as well as the talent show Encore une chance on NRJ 12 bringing together several unlucky TV candidates. Star Academy, Popstars, New Star and X Factor.

In April 2012, she hosted the Valenciennes Film Festival 2.

As of March 2012, she was trying to stage a Voices for Hope event, a multi-artist charity event organized to raise funds for the fight against pancreatic cancer. On 15 September 2012, the first edition of this charity concert took place. All of the funds were donated to the ARCAD Foundation. Many artists are present to support the cause: Patrick Bruel, Christophe Maé, Dany Brillant, Julie Zenatti, Natasha St Pier, Mickael Miro, and Franck Dubosc.

== Filmography ==
=== Television ===
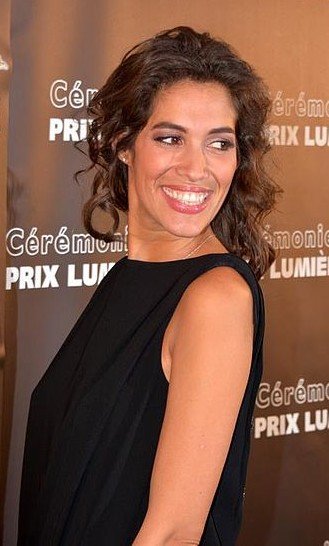
Cholewa at the 20th Lumière Awards.

- 2001: Magazine sur le cinéma avec Laurent Weil sur Ciné Cinéma
- 2005–2007: TNT Show sur Direct 8
- 2006: Morandini ! sur Direct 8 : chroniqueuse
- 2006: Ciné 8 sur Direct 8
- 2007–2009: Ça tourne sur Direct 8
- 2008–2009: L'École des stars sur Direct 8
- 2009: 2e chance sur Direct 8
- 2010: Encore une chanson sur France 2
- 2010: Dans l'univers de ... sur France 2
- 2012–2013: Vous êtes en direct sur NRJ 12 : chroniqueuse
- 2012: Le Bêtisier sur Eurosport
- 2013: Watts sur Eurosport
- 2013: Tendance O sur France O
- 2013: Disques d'or sur TMC
- 2013–2016: Le Grand Bêtisier sur TMC
- 2015: En chansons sur TMC
- 2015: Tirage du Loto et Tirage de l'Euro Millions sur TF1
- 2016: Nouvelle Star sur D8
- 2016–2017: L'Hebdo Cinéma sur Canal +
- 2016–2017: Leurs voix pour l'espoir sur CStar
- 2017: En route pour les Césars 2017 avec Laurent Weil sur Canal +
- 2017: Canal + de Cannes, avec Laurent Weil sur Canal +
- Since 2017 : Tchi Tcha sur Canal +
- Since 2017 : L'info du vrai sur Canal + : chroniqueuse
- 2017: C'est que de la télé ! sur C8 : chroniqueuse
- 2018: Le Meilleur des César avec Laurent Weil sur Canal +

=== Radio ===
- 2014–2015: 7h-9h sur Chérie FM avec Vincent Cerutti
- 2016: Le Meilleur des réveils (1 fois) avec Elodie Gossuin sur RFM
- Since 2017: 17h-20h sur RFM : Chroniqueuse cinéma le mardi
- 2017: Le Meilleur de Noël" sur RFM

== Bibliography ==
- 2016: Un jour, les autres c'est nous by Karen Assayag-Ghanem et Marion Chamak (Preface by Laurie Cholewa)
- 2017 : Menteuse ! by Laurie Cholewa

== Discography ==
- 2015: No Woman No Cry, Collectif Les voix des femmes
- 2016: Indépendantes, Collectif Les voix des femmes
