= Nouvelle Star =

French reality music competition show

- Created by: Simon Fuller
- Presented by: Benjamin Castaldi (2003–06, 2015); Virginie Efira (2006–08); Virginie Guilhaume (2008–10); Cyril Hanouna (2012–14) Laurie Cholewa (2016) Shy'm (2017)
- Country of origin: France
- No. of seasons: 13

Production
- Producer: FremantleMedia

Original release
- Network: M6 (2003–2010, 2017); D8 (2012–2016)
- Release: 27 March 2003 – 20 December 2017

Nouvelle Star (pronounced [nuvɛl staʁ]; also known as À la Recherche de la Nouvelle Star for the first season) is a French television series based on the Pop Idol programme produced by FremantleMedia. It was broadcast by M6 in seasons 1–8 before D8 aired seasons 9–12. M6 broadcast the 13th and final season.

It was hosted by Benjamin Castaldi for the first three seasons (2003–2005). He also hosted 13 episodes of seasons 4 (2006). Virginie Efira presented the remainder of season 4, as well as presenting seasons 5 and 6. Virginie Guilhaume hosted seasons 7 and 8. Since season 9, Cyril Hanouna is the Nouvelle Star's TV host.

On 4 July 2012, Bibiane Godfroid, program director of Nouvelle Star announced that the show will not return on M6 but will instead be on D8, after its acquisition by Canal +.

In 2017, M6 confirmed that season 13 would be the last.

== Format of the series ==
The four members of the jury have to judge about 25,000 contestants in various towns around France and Belgium. Until the final rounds begin, the show presents both the successful and the poorest performers, known as the "inoubliables" (unforgettable ones). Some of the worst performers have also performed as guests during the final stages.

Of the 25,000 contestants, only 150 (140 in season 6) are selected for the next round of auditions, which takes place at the Theatre Trianon in central Paris. There are two auditions over the space of three days, the highlights of which are shown over the course of two shows. Specific exercises are given to the contestants in order to evaluate their artistic talents: pitch, rhythmic accuracy, ability to remember lyrics and to learn songs, sing in a trio, and deal with tiredness and stress, etc. During the first day of the Theatre stage of auditions, contestants perform on stage in lines of eight, each contestant performing the song of their choice a capella. On day 2, 70 contestants who made it through the previous day are given a choice of three songs (two specifically for boys or for girls, and one for both, as of Series 6) and have to form trios with other contestants of their choice but of the same sex, they will be accompanied by a guitar and a piano. The 50 remaining contestants will interpret a song, in French, accompanied by an orchestra band. For the first time at this ultimate step before the live primes, this year, the contestants have performed in front of more than 400 persons including the jury at the theatre.

The jury will have to decide between 20 remaining contestants (27 in season 6) on a television screen, reviewing the all auditions of those contestants, of which they will select 15 for the first live television prime where they will be submitted to viewers' vote. In series 6, the viewers rejected 6 contestants of which the jury saved one.

There is no wildcard round in the French format, and viewers only vote by text or by phone. Only viewers' votes decide of the result during the prime, but the judges comment by giving first an illustrated verdict by colored traffic lights in front of them Blue for Good, and Red for bad performance (coloured lights introduced in season 5, and taken the form of traffic lights in season 6). The voting is different from American Idol as viewers vote during the programme and results are given at the end of it, by Virginie (The Host) and Maitre Najar (bailiff), where Virginie selects at random the saved contestants leaving only the ones dropped by the viewers. The previous seasons' jury (Mainly Marianne James) was used to contesting a lot the results.

== Auditions ==
The inaugural season featured auditions in France, Belgium, and Quebec, Canada. Later series dropped Quebec from the audition tour, as Canadian Idol had started, and therefore, Francophones could audition in their home country.

For Nouvelle Star's seasons 2, 3 and 4, auditions were held in Toulouse, Rennes, Marseille, Lyon, and Paris and in one location in Belgium, at Liège.

== Overview ==
Season	Season 1 (2003)	Season 2 (2004)	Season 3 (2005)	Season 4 (2006)	Season 5 (2007)	Season 6 (2008)	Season 7 (2009)	Season 8 (2010)	Season 9 (2012-2013)	Season 10 (2013-2014)	Season 11 (2014-2015)	Season 12 (2016)	Season 13 (2017)
Presented by	Benjamin Castaldi				Virginie Efira		Virginie Guilhaume		Cyril Hanouna		Benjamin Castaldi	Laurie Cholewa	Shy'm
Backstage	Estelle Denis								Énora Malagré		Laure Falesse		Erika Moulet
Backstage	Camille Combal												Lola Dubini
Backstage	Jérôme Anthony												
Judges	André Manoukian												Benjamin Biolay
Judges	Dove Attia					Sinclair		Marco Prince	Sinclair				Dany Synthé
Judges	Varda Kakon	Marianne James				Lio			Maurane		Elodie Frégé		Cœur de Pirate
Judges	Lionel Florence	Manu Katché				Philippe Manœuvre			Olivier Bas		Yarol Poupaud	JoeyStarr	Nathalie Noennec
Winner	Jonatan Cerrada	Steeve Estatof	Myriam Abel	Christophe Willem	Julien Doré	Amandine Bourgeois	Soan	Luce	Sophie-Tith	Mathieu Saïkaly	Emji	Paul Plexi	Xavier Matheu
Channel	M6								D8				M6
Broadcast period	27 March 2003	11 February 2004	10 February 2005	22 February 2006	28 February 2007	21 February 2008	24 February 2009	2 March 2010	11 December 2012	31 October 2013	27 November 2014	16 February 2016	1 November 2017
Broadcast period	10 July 2003	13 May 2004	12 May 2005	8 June 2006	13 June 2007	11 June 2008	9 June 2009	16 June 2010	26 February 2013	20 February 2014	12 March 2015	3 May 2016	20 December 2017

=== Awards by season ===
Rank	Contestants (In order of elimination)												
Rank	Season 1 (2003)	Season 2 (2004)	Season 3 (2005)	Season 4 (2006)	Season 5 (2007)	Season 6 (2008)	Season 7 (2009)	Season 8 (2010)	Season 9 (2012-2013)	Season 10 (2013-2014)	Season 11 (2014-2015)	Season 12 (2016)	Season 13 (2017)
1	Jonatan Cerrada	Steeve Estatof	Myriam Abel	Christophe Willem	Julien Doré	Amandine Bourgeois	Soan	Luce	Sophie-Tith	Mathieu Saïkaly	Emji	Paul Plexi	Xavier Matheu
2	Thierry Amiel	Julien Laurence	Pierrick Lilliu	Miss Dominique	Tigane Drammeh	Benjamin Siksou	Leïla Aissaoui	François Raoult	Florian Bertonnier	Yseult Onguenet	Mathieu Kolanek	Mia Rosello	Yadám Andrés Guevara
3	Jean Sébastien Lavoie	Amel Bent	Roland Karl	Gaël Faure	Gaëtane Abrial	Cédric Oheix	Camélia Jordana	Ramón Mirabet	Philippe Krier	Pauline de Tarragon	Martial Betirac	Manu Galure	Sloń
4	Alexis Juliard	Laura Tabourin	Mervyn Kennedy-Macfoy	Cindy Santos	Julie Mazi	Ycare	Thomas Bonneau	Lussi	Flo Devos	Alvaro Echánove	Pauline Laffitte	Mélanie June	Mathieu Canaby
5	Laetizia Alberti	Charles Cattaert	Francine Massiani	Valérie Castan	Pierre Darmon	Jules Pélissier	Dalé Grenoble	Benjamin Bohem	Julie Obré	Dana Ali-Ahmad	Micka Aubertin	Maxime Penent	Lilou Robert
6	Yoann Kelyann	Babeth Lando	Dan Perez	Florian Lesca	Raphaëlle Dess	Lucile Luzely	Damien Vanni	Dave Dario	Paul Kay	Sirine Betton	Maëva Bellocq	Pierre Fabre	Kamisa Negra
7	Jonathan Hassen-Ali	Pascal Crisinel	Sarah Riani	Bruno Rua	Soma Dufour	Thomas Marfisi	Lary Lambert	Annabelle	Timothée Rossignol	Mehdi Dahmane	Nelson Vard	Nirintsoa Rajoharison	Ashley Fortes
8	Cindie Bruzzi	John Zéra	Philippe Léger	Stéphanie Lipstadt	Alex Fondja	Kristov Leroy	Mahdi Jaggae	Stéphanie Vondenhoff	Charlotte Morgane Berry	Claudia Chu	Kevin Cohen	Caruso	Victor Goun's
9	Priscilla	Geoffrey Lupart	Benjamin Delcroix	Beverly	Canelle Zahy	Siân Pottok	Mélissa Nkonda	Sacha Page	Adélaïde Pratoussy	Léopoldine Hummel	Noémie Lemarchand	Caroline Pires	Azza Kamaria
10	Gabrielle Ducomble	Simongad Barbey	Malik Hemaidi	Joana Boumendil	Ilyès Yangui	Julien Pierson	Yoann Pigny	Marine Villeret	Léa Layne	Hugo Chalan-Marchio	Ursula Ravelo	Florie	Ophélie Piche
11	—	—	Corentine Planckaert	Célia Perez	Martine	Julie Bessard	Yasmina Bahj	Ambre Dupont	—	Kim Kitson	Frances Isabel Coontz	—	Béni Radriamandibi
12	—	—	Ségolène Gerlinger	Jean-Charles Chapuis	Michel Colyn	Cindy Agostinho	Antoine Vignette	Lucia de Carvalho	—	Julie Dessoude	—	—	Carla de Coignac
13	—	—	Géraldine Jonet	Sophie Claret	Vincent Galahad	Axelle Anduze	Charlotte Robin	Anna Torné	—	Chehinaze	—	—	—
14	—	—	Rabbia	Vladimir Streiff	Isabelle Ithurburu	Clément Falgous	Maria-Paz	Manon Trinquier	—	Ezra Van Vliet	—	—	—
15	—	—	Gérôme Gallo	—	Mounir Ouarab	Fred	Mickaël Frémeaux	Siegfried Martin-Diaz	—	Laura Migné	—	—	—
16	—	—	—	—	—	—	—	—	—	Marc Touati	—	—	—

== Spin-offs ==
=== Nouvelle Star, ça continue... ===
Nouvelle Star, ça continue... is a program broadcast directly after the prime Nouvelle Star shows. It was broadcast on Fun TV (2003-2005), W9 (2006-2009), M6 (2010) and now on C8. The show includes interviews with judges, saved or eliminated contestants des jurés, invited musical guests. Hosts were Adrien Lemaître on Fun TV, Alexandre Devoise, Jérôme Anthony and Sidonie Bonnec all on W9, Estelle Denis and Jérôme Anthony on M6 with Camille Combal giving a diary, Énora Malagré on D8.

=== Saga Nouvelle Star ===
Saga Nouvelle Star or La Saga Nouvelle Star was an old daily show hosted by Virginie Efira on M6, following various seasons of the Nouvelle Star show. It was broadcast only in 2007 and then stopped. In each show, she would present Top des Inoubliables internationaux (meaning best of international unforgettables), being winners from various countries where Idol series are broadcast. Broadcast at 19:00 in access prime time, it brought in an average 1.1 million of viewers.

== Summary ==
Season	Premiere	Final	Winner	Runner-up	Judges	Host(s)
1*	27 March 2003	10 July 2003	Jonatan Cerrada	Thierry Amiel	Dove Attia; Varda Kakon; Lionel Florence; André Manoukian	Benjamin Castaldi
2	11 February 2004	13 May 2004	Steeve Estatof	Julien Laurence	Dove Attia; Marianne James; Manu Katché; André Manoukian	Benjamin Castaldi
3	10 February 2005	12 May 2005	Myriam Abel	Pierrick Lilliu	Dove Attia; Marianne James; Manu Katché; André Manoukian	Benjamin Castaldi
4	22 February 2006	8 June 2006	Christophe Willem	Dominique Michalon	Dove Attia; Marianne James; Manu Katché; André Manoukian	Benjamin Castaldi
5	28 February 2007	13 June 2007	Julien Doré	Tigane Drammeh	Dove Attia; Marianne James; Manu Katché; André Manoukian	Virginie Efira
6	21 February 2008	13 June 2008	Amandine Bourgeois	Benjamin Siksou	Lio; Philippe Manœuvre; Sinclair; André Manoukian	Virginie Efira
7	24 February 2009	9 June 2009	Soan	Leïla Aissaoui	Lio; Philippe Manœuvre; Sinclair; André Manoukian	Virginie Guilhaume
8	2 March 2010	16 June 2010	Luce Brunet	François Raoult	Lio; Philippe Manœuvre; André Manoukian; Marco Prince	Virginie Guilhaume
9	11 December 2012	26 February 2013	Sophie-Tith Charvet	Florian Bertonnier	Olivier Bas; André Manoukian; Maurane; Sinclair	Cyril Hanouna
10	31 October 2013	20 February 2014	Mathieu Saikaly	Yseult Onguenet	Olivier Bas; André Manoukian; Maurane; Sinclair	Cyril Hanouna
11	27 November 2014	12 March 2015	Emji	Mathieu Kolanek	Élodie Frégé; André Manoukian; Yarol Poupaud; Sinclair	Benjamin Castaldi
12	13 February 2016	3 May 2016	Patrick Rouiller	Mia Rosello	Élodie Frégé; André Manoukian; Joey Starr; Sinclair	Laurie Cholewa
13	1 November 2017	20 December 2017	Xavier Matheu	Yadám Andrés Guevara	Benjamin Biolay; Dany Synthé; Nathalie Noennec; Cœur de Pirate	Shy'm

*Also known as À la Recherche de la Nouvelle Star

== See also ==
- List of French adaptations of television series from other countries
