= Gaël Faure =

French singer-songwriter

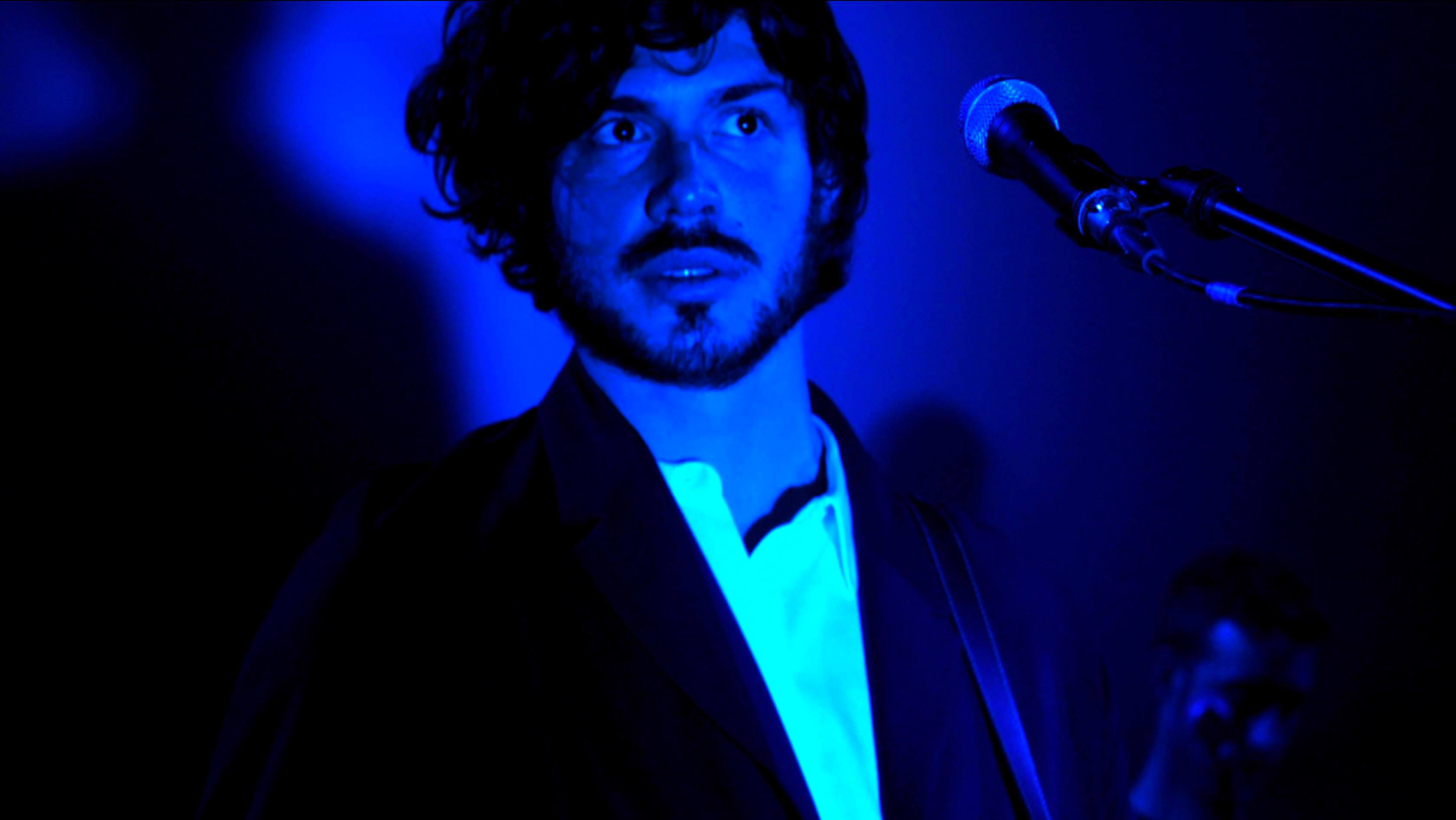
Gael Faure - 2017

Gaël Faure (born 7 July 1987) is a French singer-songwriter. He has toured internationally and has released two albums and several singles.

== Biography ==
Faure was born in Valence. He bought his first guitar at the age of fourteen and started song writing the year after. He studied landscape gardening.

== Career ==
In 2005, Faure auditioned for the fourth series of Nouvelle Star (the French version of Pop Idol). Faurer recorded the group track J'irai chanter with Cindy Santos, Miss Dominique, and Christophe Willem under the Sony BMG label. Written by Marie-Jo Zarb, Laura Marciano and Simon Caby, the song ranked eighth in the French charts, as well as 19th in the Belgian and 25th in the Swiss charts. He reached the semi-final in this series of the televised talent show.

Faure first performed on stage in 2007, singing the songs he had written. A year and a half later, he worked on his first record with Serge Khalifa, an independent music producer. He recorded his first album Jardin en ville in Paris, in collaboration with Nadia Farès, Rob Harris and Matt Johnson. It was released in August 2008. Jardin en ville reached number two in the album sales chart on Virgin's digital platform and fifth place in the album chart for French Pop on the iTunes Store.

Faure sang on the track Nos blessures d'hier, which appears in the credits of the series Pas de secrets entre nous. This single was areleased in September 2008 under the label M6 Interaction. The limited success of his first album led Faure to perform at many venues in France and Belgium, after which he settled down in Brussels.

In January 2012, Faure signed a contract with the label Jipe Epic, part of the Sony Music Entertainment group. Teté, Ben Ricour, Chet, Jean-Louis Piérot, Barcella and Fabien Boeuf worked with Gaël Faure to complete his second album. Two singles were released in advance of the album, On dirait l'Islande (You'd Think it Was Iceland) and Tu me suivras (You Will Follow Me). The album, De silences en bascules was released in February 2014. Tu me suivras reached number 37 in the Belgian charts.

In 2015 Faure performed concerts with Antoine Delecroix in British Columbia, Quebec, Nova Scotia and New Brunswick while on a Canadian tour organized by Coup de cœur francophone.
