= Virginie Guilhaume =

French television presenter (born 1977)

- Born: 30 November 1977 (age 47); Paris, France
- Occupation: Television presenter
- Years active: 2007–present
- Notable credit(s): Nouvelle Star; Secrets de famille Qui sera le prochain grand pâtissier ?
- Television: M6 (2008–2011); France 2 (2007, 2011–2016)

Virginie Guilhaume (born 30 November 1977) is a French television presenter.

== Television career ==
=== Education and beginnings on France 2 ===
Virginie Guilhaume graduated from the École supérieure de journalisme de Paris. She began her career as a production assistant for television presenters, including Thierry Ardisson, Guillaume Durand and Michel Drucker. First a journalist, image reporter, then chief editor, France 2 gave her the opportunity in February 2007 to present entertainment programs.

She joined the channel to host with Olivier Minne special evening shows like La Saint Valentin en chansons. She then presented during summer 2007 the program Les Rois du Rire, broadcast on Saturday during the second part of the evening. The program was then broadcast on some Saturdays in the late afternoon, in the evening of New Year's Eve, or more exceptionally, as a tribute to deceased humorists. She continued in the meantime to present special programs in prime, often with Olivier Minne, including Tubes des Tubes in July 2007, Les stars de l'année 2007 in December 2007, and even Les Femmes en chansons in April 2008.

=== Presenter on M6 ===
In 2008, Virginie Guilhaume joined M6 where she presented in August a program dedicated to the jet set titled Stars et Fortunes. In September of that year, she presented the weekly documentary dedicated to celebrities Accès Privé.

In 2009 and 2010, she presented the seventh and eighth season of Nouvelle Star, succeeding to Virginie Efira.

She was then replaced by Faustine Bollaert for Accès Privé from November 2010 to January 2011 due to maternity leave. She started presenting again the program from January to June 2011. It was also Faustine Bollaert who replaced her to present the Grand bêtisier des stars in December 2010.

In June 2011, Virginie Guilhaume left M6 to return on France 2 in September of that year, the channel of her beginnings.

=== Return on France 2 ===
She presented a new program titled Secrets de famille, broadcast on Wednesday during the second part of the evening. She was also entrusted on a primetime presenting the different programs of the channel including their presenters. The program titled C'est la rentrée was broadcast in September 2012. She then presented different programs such as Rire ensemble contre la racisme and Les Rois du Bêtisier.

Since 2012, she presented the program Retour en terre inconnue along with Frédéric Lopez. In this program broadcast live just after Rendez-vous en terre inconnue, the guest personality talks about the most significant moments of his experience.

In October 2012, she co-hosted again with Olivier Minne the Concert pour la tolérance. She then presented in February 2013 at the Zénith de Paris the Victoires de la Musique with Laurent Ruquier, broadcast on France 2.

In July 2013, she presented the first season of the professional pastry contest Qui sera le prochain grand pâtissier ? for four episodes.

In September 2013, she replaced Alessandra Sublet on the presentation of the program Hier Encore with Charles Aznavour. She also presented at that time Un air de famille on the same channel, a program that ended on 4 November 2013. She then presented the Bêtisier de Noël at the end of the same year and the backstage of Le Grand Show.

In February 2014, she co-hosted the Victoires de la Musique on France 2 with Laurent Ruquier. The program managed to reach the symbolic audience of 3 million viewers, which had not happened for five years. In May and June 2014, she presented the second season of the pastry contest Qui sera le prochain grand pâtissier ? for six episodes.

In May 2015, she is the spokesperson for France in the Eurovision Song Contest 2015, which took place in Vienna, announcing directly from Paris the score given by the French jury. The following month, at the eve of the Fête de la musique, she co-hosted the evening titled Du soleil et des tubes with Patrick Sébastien from Nice and broadcast live on France 2.

In July 2015, she presented the third season of the pastry contest Qui sera le prochain grand pâtissier ? for four episodes. In September 2015, she started presenting on France 2 the weekly cultural program Grand Public.

In February 2016, she co-hosted the Victoires de la Musique with Bruno Guillon. In November 2016, Virginie Guilhaume left France 2.

== Personal life ==
Virginie Guilhaume was born in Paris, the daughter of Philippe Guilhaume, former director of Antenne 2 and FR3 from August 1989 to December 1990, and Brigitte Schmit, former director of communications at Antenne 2. She is the grandniece of Jacques Chaban-Delmas.

Virginie Guilhaume married in 2007 the television producer Stéphane Gateau. They have a son named Romeo, born on 3 December 2010. The couple divorced a few years later.

In November 2017, she was expecting her second child. On 29 March 2018, she gave birth to a girl named Marnie. The father is Hervé Louis, the co-founder of Sushi Shop, who sold his company in September 2018 for 240 million euros.

== Humanitarian engagement ==
Virginie Guilhaume is engaged since 2007 to a humanitarian foundation Caméléon, that protects and rehabilitates young girls from Philippines victim of sexual abuse.

In 2010, she is one of the spokespersons of the Flamme Marie Claire, a caritative event for the schooling of disadvantaged little girls in the world that allows to raise funds by selling candles.

== Television programs ==
Year	Title	Notes
2007	La Saint Valentin en chansons	With Olivier Minne
2007	Tubes des Tubes	
2007	Les Stars de l'année	With Olivier Minne
2007–2008	Les Rois du Rire	
2007–2008	Les Rois du Bêtisier	
2008	Les Femmes en chansons	With Olivier Minne
2008	Stars et fortunes	
2008–2011	Accès Privé	First to third season
2008–2011	Le Grand Bêtisier des stars	
2009–2010	Nouvelle Star	Seventh and eighth season
2010	Les 20 images de Johnny que les Français n'oublieront jamais	With Laurent Boyer
2010	Les 20 "Surprise sur prise" que les Français n'oublieront jamais	With Laurent Boyer
2012	C'est la rentrée	
2012	Ta mère en 6^{e}	
2012	Rire ensemble contre le racisme	
2012–2015	Les Rois du Bêtisier	
2012–2016	Retour en terre inconnue	With Frédéric Lopez
2013	Simplement pour un soir	With Patrick Sabatier
2013	Ils chantent pour la tolérance	With Olivier Minne
2013	Un air de famille	
2013–2015	Qui sera le prochain grand pâtissier ?	First to third season
2013–2015	Hier Encore	With Charles Aznavour
2013–2016	Victoires de la Musique	With Laurent Ruquier, then Bruno Guillon
2014	La Grande Soirée du Rire	
2014	Une femme, un artiste	
2014	La Grande Battle	With Jean-François Zygel
2015	Eurovision Song Contest's Greatest Hits	Spokesperson for France
2015	La Fête de la musique, du soleil et des tubes	With Patrick Sébastien
2015–2016	Grand Public	
2019	Mud Day, la course dans la boue	With Yoann Riou

== Filmography ==
Year	Title	Role	Notes
2015	L'Hôtel du libre échange	Marcelle Paillardin	Play by Georges Feydeau, starring 32 presenters and journalists
2019	Camping Paradis	Bérangère Parizot	Season 10, episode 5
