= Sophie-Tith =

French singer

- Born: Sophie-Tith Charvet; 19 September 1996 (age 29); Ambilly (Haute-Savoie, France)
- Genres: Folk rock
- Occupation: singer
- Instruments: Saxophone, Guitar
- Years active: 2013–present
- Label: Universal Music Group Polydor
- Website: www.sophie-tith-music.com

Sophie-Tith Charvet (born 19 September 1996) is a French singer and winner of the television show Nouvelle Star in 2013.

== Biography ==
Sophie-Tith is the third of a family of three daughters. She was born in Ambilly and grew up in a house in Ville-la-Grand, a town in the northern suburbs of Annemasse in Haute-Savoie. The second part of her name is Laotian for origin and reason, human feeling, or alternatively Tith pronounced teat means "small". She attended Pottières kindergarten, then the Centre elementary school and Paul Langevin middle school. She then went to Jean Monnet high school in Vétraz-Monthoux, specialising in economics and science. Having repeated a year because of the heavy workload imposed on her by La Nouvelle Star, and the preparation of her first album, she obtained her baccalaureate in 2015. She continued her studies at the Condé school in Paris.

She fell in love with music at the age of 7 and learned the saxophone and music theory. But gradually, she turned to rock music. With four friends, she founded the group Asmoday , an indie rock quintet who were an opening act for Rage Against The Marmots. Sophie-Tith eventually left the girl band She stopped studying music theory and saxophone at the age of 14 to focus on her schooling, but at high school, when she was 16, she and her friends founded the group Nova which had 5 members with Sophie on vocals.

In 2013 she took part in the talent show Nouvelle Star which she won on February 26, in a public vote against runner-up Florian Bertonnier. She won an album contract with Polydor First Encounters, a cover album produced in part by Sinclair, was released in 2013. On October 7, 2013, Aldebert's album Enfantillages 2 featuring Sophie-Tith was released. She sang a duet with him on the song Little angels.

On February 20, 2014, she made an appearance on the set of La Nouvelle Star, for a duet with the two finalists, Mathieu and Isolde. In April 2014 she released her second album I like it that contains a duet with Corson The album was co-written with the singers of BB Brunes and Skip the Use. Its sales were modest.

== Route to La Nouvelle Star ==
Sophie-Tith signed up for the show a week after her 16th birthday. She went to castings in Lyon and got 4 yes votes from the panel (André Manoukian, Sinclair, Maurane and Olivier Bas), letting her travel to Paris for the next round. She reached the round for singing in trios with a version of Bang Bang by Nancy Sinatra. She then performed It vexes me by Mademoiselle K for the orchestral playback round. But the choice was difficult for the judges who decided to set up a final test in a sudden death round. Sophie sang Mad World by Tears for Fears. She was one of 10 candidates selected for the live performance. To date, she is the youngest winner of La Nouvelle Star.
