= Camélia Jordana =

French pop singer

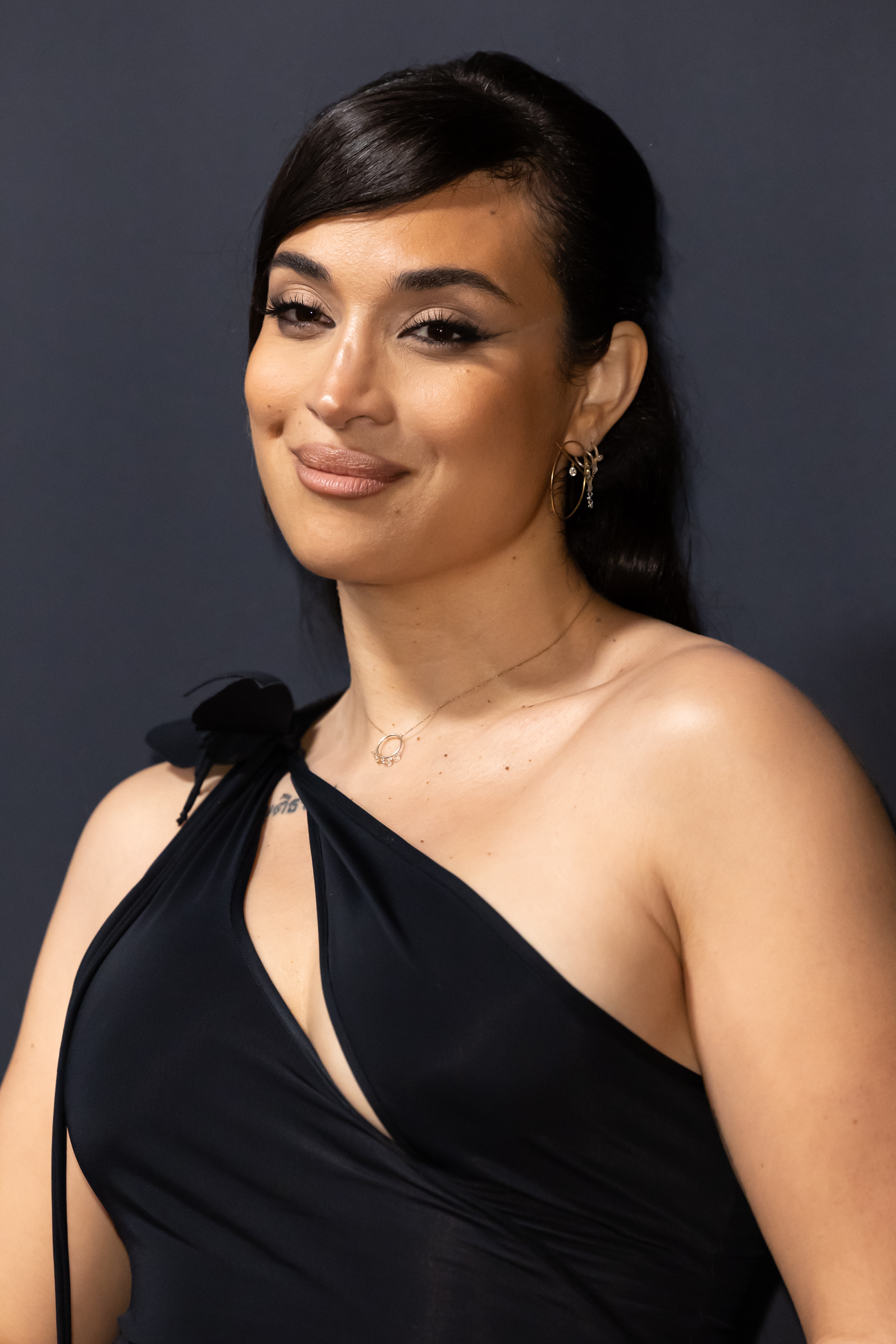
- Jordana in 2025

Background information
- Born: Camélia Jordana Aliouane; 15 September 1992 (age 33); Toulon, France
- Genres: French pop, chanson, Folk pop
- Occupation: Singer
- Instrument: Vocals
- Years active: 2009–present
- Label: Sony Music France
- Website: www.cameliajordana.fr

Camélia Jordana Aliouane (born 15 September 1992) is a French pop singer. She rose to fame after participating in the television show Nouvelle Star, the French version of Pop Idol, in 2009, where she placed 3rd. Since 2013 she has appeared in leading roles in a number of French films.

== Life and career ==
Jordana was born on 15 September 1992 in Toulon, to French parents of Algerian descent. Her father Hachemi is of Berber Kabyle origin and her mother Zélihka an Arab from Oran. She grew up in La Londe-les-Maures with her older sister and younger brother.

At the age of sixteen, she decided to audition for the seventh season of Nouvelle Star in Marseille, and managed to convince the jury with her version of Louis Armstrong's "What a Wonderful World". She finished in third place. After her elimination, she signed a record deal with Sony Music and released her eponymous debut album on 29 March 2010. It sold 10,169 copies in its first week and managed to enter the French SNEP Album Chart at #9.

Although Jordana's debut single "Non Non Non (Écouter Barbara)" was only released as download single in France, it peaked at #3 on the French digital chart. It also charted at #3 in Belgium and #48 in Switzerland.

She participated in a song for the album So in Love by Nouvelle Star judge André Manoukian in April 2010.

Jordana was interviewed and played several songs on the TV5Monde programme Acoustic on 7 November 2010.

She was on the jury of the Semaine de la Critique section at the 2021 Cannes Film Festival.

She featured on Emel's album MRA (2024), singing on "Mazel".

== Philanthropy ==
On 27 November 2015, Jordana participated together with Nolwenn Leroy and Yael Naim at the national memorial day for the victims of the November 2015 Paris attacks singing the song “Quand on n'a que l'amour” by Jacques Brel.

In June 2024, Jordana signed a petition addressed to French President Emmanuel Macron demanding France to officially recognize the State of Palestine.

== Discography ==
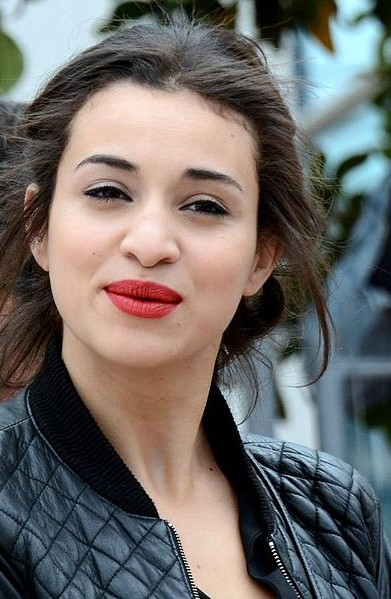
Jordana at the 2014 Cannes Film Festival.

Year	Album	Peak Position		
Year	Album	FR	BEL (Wa)	CH
2010	Camélia Jordana	7	12	36
2014	Dans la peau	15	29	70
2018	LOST	133	—	—
2021	facile x fragile	3	25	—
2021	Sorøre (with Amel Bent and Vitaa)	13	13	46

=== Singles ===
Year	Single	Peak Position				Album
Year	Single	FR	FR (Downloads)	BEL (Wa)	CH	Album
2010	"Non Non Non (Écouter Barbara)"	—	3	3	48	Camélia Jordana
2010	"Calamity Jane"	—	—	—	—	Camélia Jordana
2011	"Moi c'est"	—	35	—	—	Camélia Jordana
2014	"Dans la peau"	95	—	—	—	Dans la peau
2021	"Ma sœur" (with Amel Bent and Vitaa)	159	—	—	—	Sorøre
"—" denotes releases that did not chart or were not released in that country.

== Filmography ==
Year	Title	Role	Director	Notes
2013	The Stroller Strategy	Mélanie	Clément Michel	
2013	Ta main	Natasha	Thomas Bardinet	Short
2013	Les mauvaises têtes	Fanny	Pierre Isoard	TV movie
2014	Bird People	Leila	Pascale Ferran	
2015	All Three of Us	Maryam	Kheiron	
2015	I'm All Yours	Kenza	Baya Kasmi	
2015	L'heureuse élue	Djemila	Karima Gherdaoui & Anne Voutey	Short
2015	The Last Panthers	Samira	Johan Renck	TV Mini-Series
2016	La fine équipe	Salima	Magaly Richard-Serrano	
2017	Some Like It Veiled	Leila	Sou Abadi	
2017	Le Brio	Neïla Salah	Yvan Attal	César Award for Most Promising Actress; Nominated – Lumière Award for Best Female Revelation
2018	Chacun pour tous	Julia	Vianney Lebasque	
2018	Spider-Man: Into The Spider-Verse	Gwen Stacy / Spider-Woman	Bob Persichetti, Peter Ramsey, Rodney Rothman	European French dubbed version
2019	Curiosa	Zohra Ben Brahim	Lou Jeunet	
2019	Sisters in Arms	Kenza	Caroline Fourest	
2019	La nuit venue	Naomi	Frédéric Farrucci	
2020	Love Affair(s)	Daphné	Emmanuel Mouret	Lumière Award for Best Film 2021
2024	Silent Storms		Dania Reymond-Boughenou	
