= Amandine Bourgeois =

French singer (born 1979)

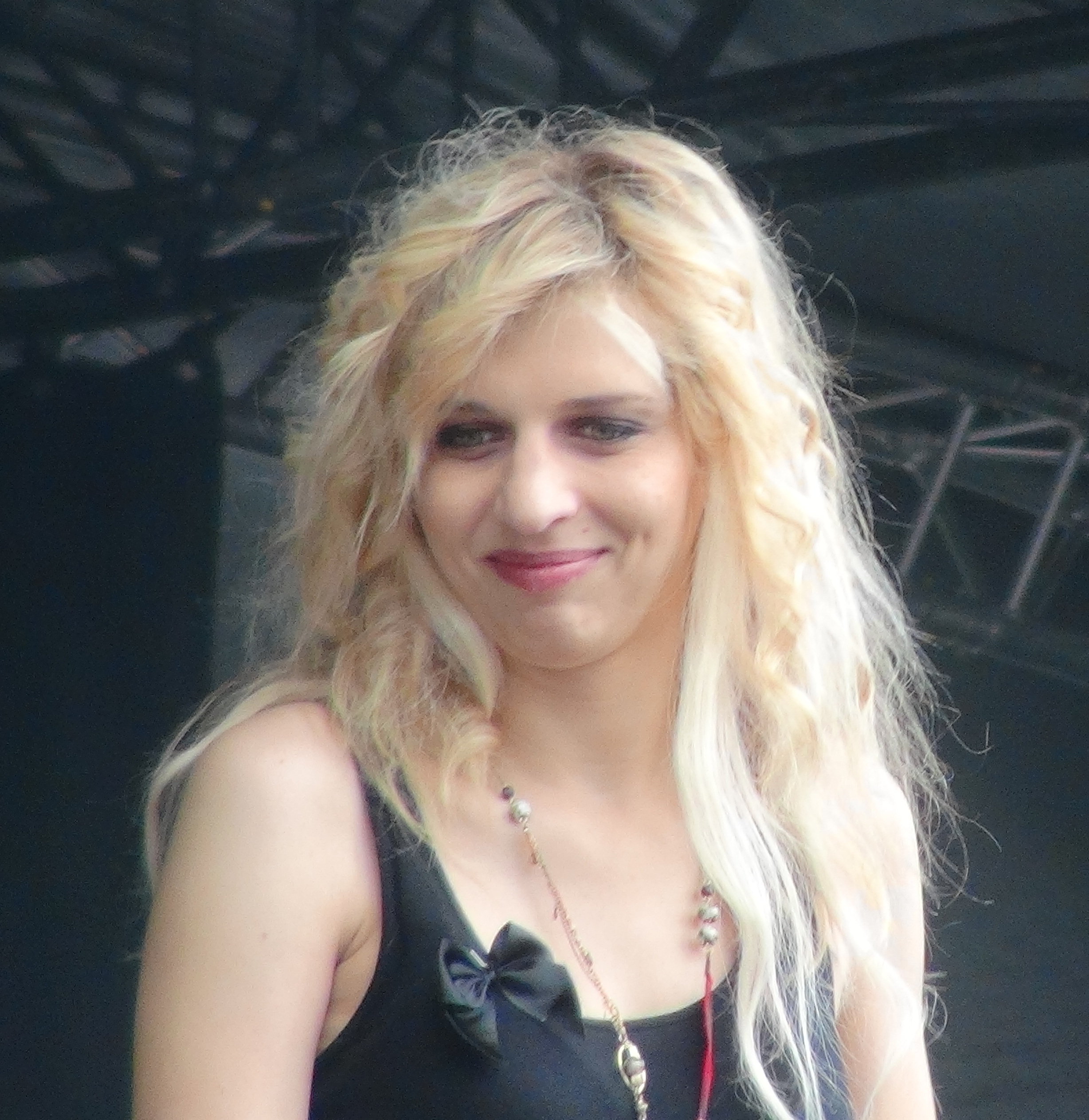

Background information
- Born: 12 June 1979 (age 47); Angoulême, Charente, France
- Genres: Pop
- Occupations: Singer, musician, songwriter, actress
- Instruments: Vocals, guitar
- Years active: 2005–present
- Label: Sony Music
- Website: amandinebourgeois-officiel.com

Amandine Bourgeois presenting herself and her Eurovision Song Contest Song L'enfer et moi.

Amandine Bourgeois (French pronunciation: [amɑ̃din buʁʒwa]; born 12 June 1979, in Angoulême, Charente) is a French singer. She was the winner of the sixth edition of the French version of the Pop Idol series Nouvelle Star in 2008. On 26 July 2014, Bourgeois participated in the television game show Fort Boyard.

== Eurovision Song Contest 2013 ==
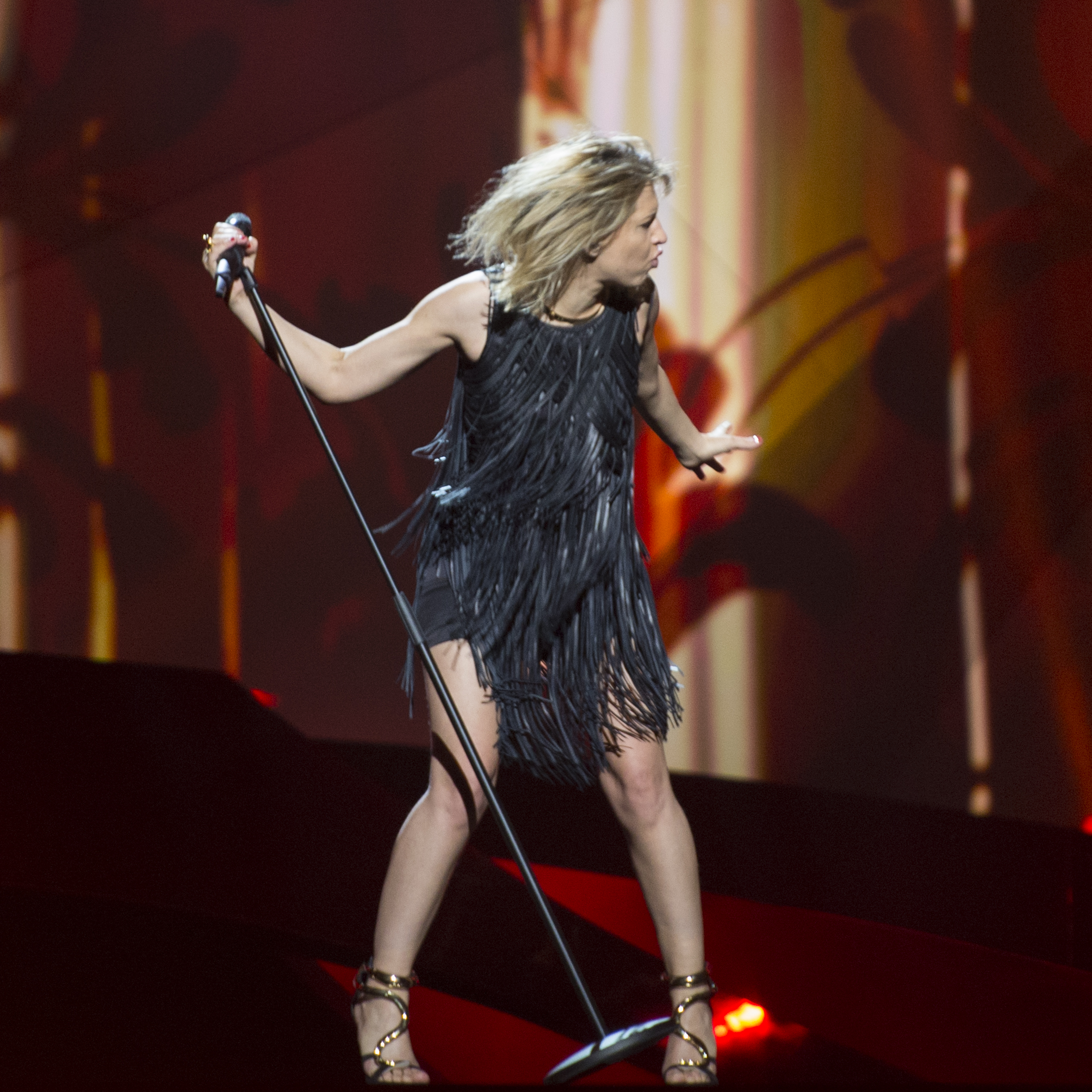
Amandine Bourgeois during the Eurovision Song Contest 2013 .

Le Parisien announced on 22 January 2013, that Bourgeois would represent France at the Eurovision Song Contest 2013 in Malmö, Sweden, with the song "L'enfer et moi", coming 23rd in the final.

== Discography ==
=== Albums ===
Title	Album details	Peak chart positions		
Title	Album details	FRA	BEL (Wa)	SWI
20 m²	Released: 28 May 2009; Label: Sony Music Entertainment; Formats: CD, digital download	5	8	22
Sans amour mon amour	Released: 19 March 2012; Label: Sony Music Entertainment; Formats: CD, digital download	44	65	—
Au masculin	Released: 5 May 2014; Label: Warner Music; Formats: CD, digital download	52	58	—
"—" denotes album that did not chart or was not released.

=== Singles ===
==== As lead artist ====
Title	Year	Peak chart positions		Album
Title	Year	FRA	BEL (Wa)	Album
"L'homme de la situation"	2009	—	17	20 m²
"Tant de moi"	2009	—	—	20 m²
"Du temps"	2010	—	—	20 m²
"Sans amour"	2011	—	13	Sans amour mon amour
"Incognito" (feat. Murray James)	2012	161	—	Sans amour mon amour
"Envie d'un manque de problèmes"	2012	—	26	Sans amour mon amour
"L'enfer et moi"	2013	—	—	—
"Ma gueule"	2014	—	—	Au masculin
"Alors on danse"	2014	—	—	Au masculin
"—" denotes single that did not chart or was not released

==== As featured artist ====
Year	Title	Album
2011	"Still Loving You – Je t'aime encore" (Scorpions feat. Amandine Bourgeois)	Comeblack

=== Other charted songs ===
Year	Title	Peak chart positions	Album
Year	Title	FRA	Album
2012	"Au bout de mes rêves" (Emmanuel Moire and Amandine Bourgeois)	143	Génération Goldman
"—" denotes single that did not chart or was not released

Preceded by Julien Doré	Nouvelle Star winner 2008	Succeeded by Soan
Preceded by Anggun with "Echo"	France in the Eurovision Song Contest; 2013	Succeeded by Twin Twin with "Moustache"
