= Élodie Frégé =

French singer and actress

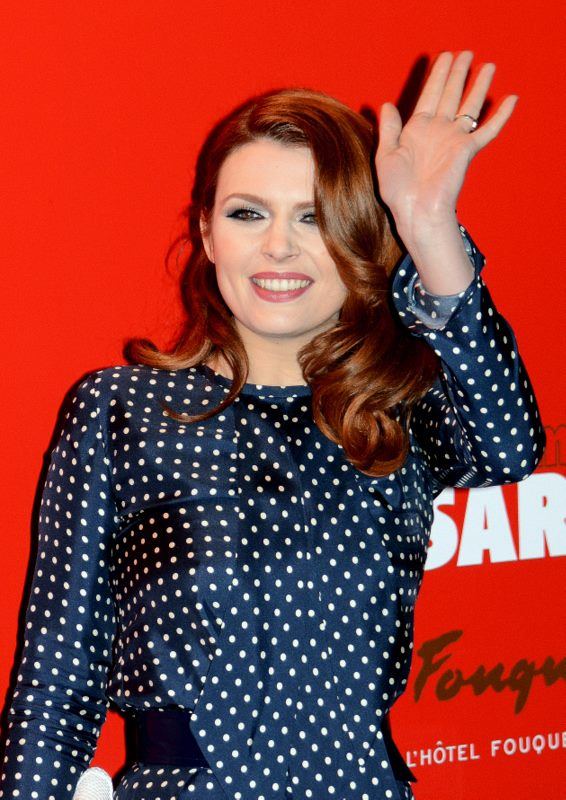
- Frégé at the 40th César Awards ceremony, 2015

Background information
- Born: 15 February 1982 (age 44); Cosne-Cours-sur-Loire, Bourgogne-Franche-Comté, France
- Genres: Chanson, pop
- Occupations: Singer, actress
- Years active: 2003–present
- Labels: Universal Music International, Mercury France
- Website: elodiefrege.artistes.universalmusic.fr

Élodie Frégé (French pronunciation: [elɔdi fʁeʒe]; born 15 February 1982) is a French singer and actress. She was the winner of the third season of the French reality singing competition Star Academy France. She released her self-titled début album after winning the show.

== Career ==
Frégé auditioned for Star Academy Season 3 and won the title in 2004.

From 2014 to 2015, she was also a judge on the 11th season of the reality singing competition show Nouvelle Star.

== Discography ==
=== Albums ===
Year	Album	Peak positions			Certification
Year	Album	FR	BEL (Wa)	SWI	Certification
2004	Élodie Frégé	4	7	27	
2006	Le jeu des 7 erreurs	12	11	65	
2010	La fille de l'après midi	28	24	–	
2013	Amuse bouches	19	27	–	

=== Singles ===
Year	Single	Peak positions			Album
Year	Single	FR	BEL (Wa)	SWI	Album
2004	"De l'eau"	16	11	49	Elodie Frégé
2004	"Viens jusqu'à moi" (duet with Michal)	8	5	30	Elodie Frégé
2004	"Je te dis non"	38	36	–	Elodie Frégé
2006	"La ceinture"	–	38	–	Le jeu des 7 erreurs
2006	"Si je reste (un peu)"	–	–	–	Le jeu des 7 erreurs
2007	"La fidélité"	–	–	–	Le jeu des 7 erreurs
2010	"La fille de l'après midi"	–	–	–	La fille de l'après midi
2011	"La belle et la bête"	–	–	–	La fille de l'après midi
2013	"Comment t'appelles-tu ce matin ?"	127	31 (Ultratip)	–	Amuse Bouches
2013	"La ceinture" (rerelease)	116	–	–	
2013	"Un jour mon prince viendra"	109	–	–	
2014	"Il pleut"	67	37 (Ultratip)	–	La Bande à Renaud

== Filmography ==
Year	Title	Role	Notes
2010	Potiche	Young Suzanne	
2012	Hénaut Président	Herself	
2014	The Easy Way Out	Julie	

Preceded by Nolwenn Leroy	Winner of Star Academy France; 2004	Succeeded by Grégory Lemarchal
