= Erika Moulet =

French journalist and television host

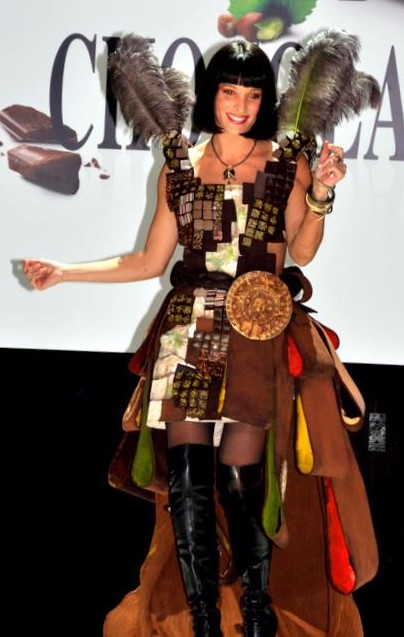
- Erika Moulet in October 2012
- Born: 23 January 1982 (age 44); Verdun, France
- Education: ISCPA - Institut des Médias, Institut International de Communication de Paris (IICP Paris X)
- Occupations: Journalist, television host
- Notable credit(s): Top Story, on TV Breizh, Le Jour qui a changé ma vie on TF1, L’after news on LCI
- Spouse: Bachar Khalifé
- Children: 3

Erika Moulet (born 23 January 1982) is a French journalist and television host.

== Biography ==
After a first year of journalism studies in ISCPA - Institut des Médias, Erika joined the Institut International de Communication de Paris (IICP Paris X). She also studied philosophy at the Sorbonne. She has worked at Infosport, France Soir and most recently Europe 1 with Jean-Marc Morandini. During an internship as personal assistant to Harry Roselmack on LCI she was selected by the management of the LCI channel to work as one of its anchorwomen on April 7, 2007. Since June 2008, she has been presenting Top Story the top news show on TV Breizh.

In France Erika Moulet is famous for her looks, especially her hairstyle.

Erika Moulet was the guest of the "Vivement Dimanche" show, hosted by Michel Drucker which aired on France 2 on December 7, 2008.
