= Myriam Abel =

French singer

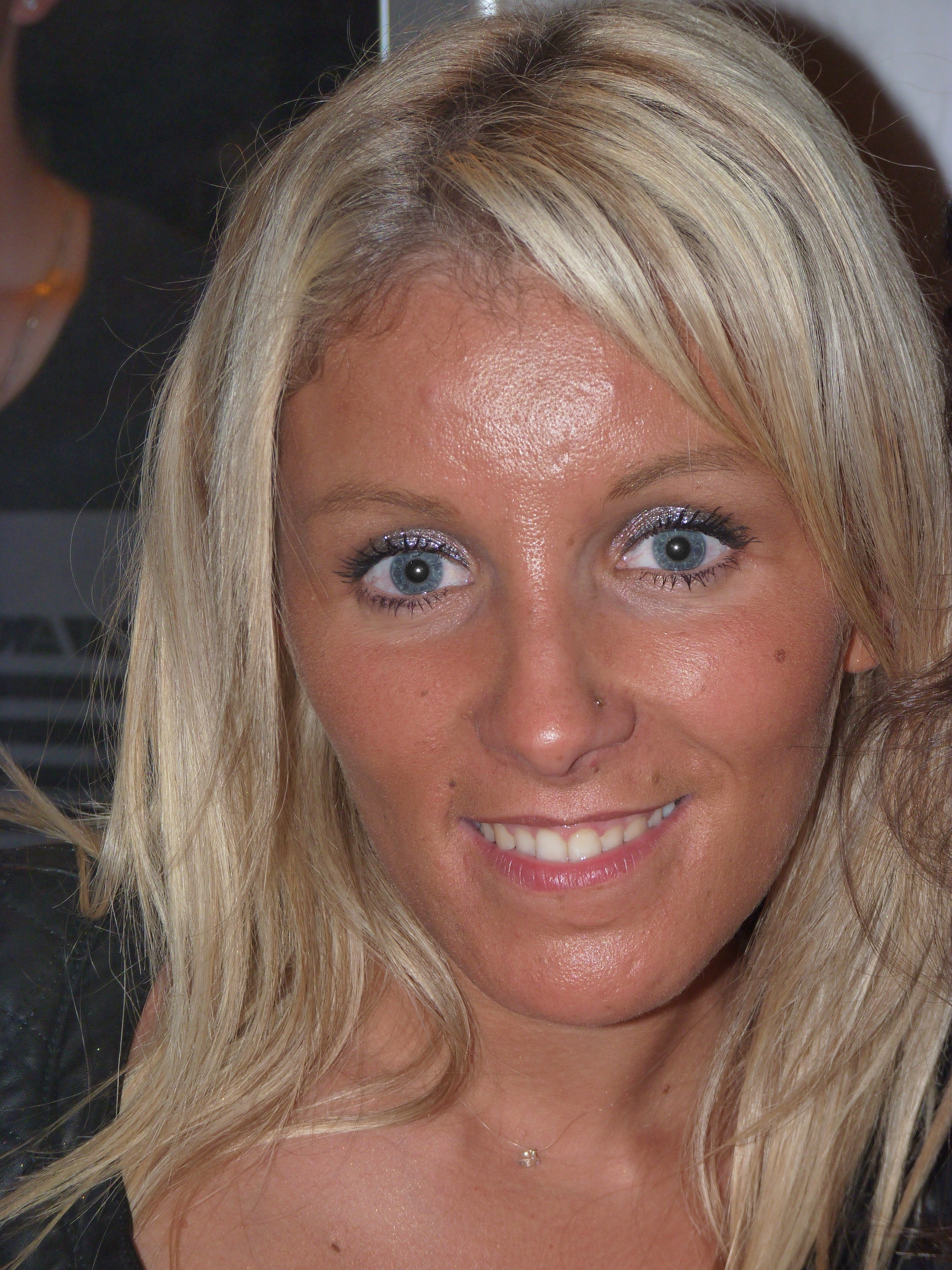

Background information
- Also known as: Myriam Moorea, Myriam Morea
- Born: Myriam Abdelhamid; 15 May 1981 (age 45); Gard, France
- Origin: La Grand-Combe, Gard, France
- Genres: R&B, Dance Pop, Soul
- Occupation: Singer-songwriter
- Instrument: Vocals
- Years active: 1995–present
- Labels: RCA Music France, Sony Music France
- Website: www.myriamabel.com

Myriam Abdelhamid (born 15 May 1981), known professionally as Myriam Abel, is a French singer who rose to popularity after winning the third season of Nouvelle Star, the French version of Pop Idol, in 2005.

In 2011 and 2012, she competed in Les Anges de la télé-réalité.

== Early career ==
Myriam Abdelhamid was born in Gard to parents of Kabyle origin. She began singing at the age of ten and, at the age of thirteen, participated in a singing competition. She then decided to take singing lessons at Les Voix d'Or with Indira Henni, who also became her artistic director. Having adopted the stage name Myriam Moorea, she made her television debut on the program Je passe à la télé on 2 May 1997, receiving 93% of the public vote.

Moorea sang with various orchestras, including those of Gilles Pellegrini and René Coll. Songwriter Tristan Fedoras noticed her and contacted Indira Henni in 1997. He wrote several songs for Moorea and also became her new manager before moving on to focus on his own musical style. Together, they recorded their first songs. Moorea entered a rising star competition with seventy singers in 1998 in Beaune and was initially selected before the producers decided to exclude all non-junior singers. In December 1998, she recorded new songs written by Fedoras and Corinne Calame. Moorea was selected for the Golden Rose of Antibes Contest on 2 July 1999, where she finished in second place.

Moorea was selected by Disney to record a French-language version of "When She Loved Me"—titled "Quand elle m'aimait encore"—for the French soundtrack of Toy Story 2. Removing an O from her stage name, she was credited as Myriam Morea on the soundtrack.

In January 2000, Morea attended the KKL party at the Palais des Sports, Lætitia Larusso's first party. There she met Gloria Gaynor's producers, and worked with them for two years. With these producers, she recorded several songs including "Comme je t'aime", which she performed at La Chance on 19 October 2000. The song was released as a single in 2001.

== Nouvelle Star, Donne and Qui je suis (2003-2011) ==
In 2003, Morea joined the band Festival Mibely. That year, she auditioned for the first season of Nouvelle Star (the French version of Pop Idol), but was eliminated during the first stage selections in Marseille. She auditioned for the third season two years later, and won the competition on 12 May 2005, becoming the first female singer to do so. She thus gained the opportunity to record an album with Sony BMG. However, the contract she had previously signed with Outcom Production was made public, which violated the rules of the show, which was reserved for fans and did not allow professional singers. This also prevented the release of an album with Sony, though she released her first single "Donne", produced by Lara Fabian and Jean-Félix Lalanne, at the end of 2005 under her new stage name, Myriam Abel. The song was removed from the airwaves by BMG due to legal issues before being broadcast again. The album La vie devant toi was finally released in December 2005 and was the ninth bestselling album in France. Abel remade the song "Baby Can I Hold You" by Tracy Chapman in the summer of 2006. An album was reissued with that title, but did not meet massive success. Eventually, "Donne" only reached the status of a silver disc for selling more than 100,000 copies sold.

Her second studio album, Qui je suis, was released to stores on 31 January 2011. The album included tracks such as Trop vite and Le Cœur ailleurs. It peaked at 188th place in French charts where it stayed for one week.

== Personal life ==
Abel married fellow musician Roland Baron in 2015. They have a son born in 2009.

== Discography ==
=== Albums ===
- 26 December 2005: La Vie Devant Toi (#9 FR)
- 31 January 2011 : Qui je suis (#110 FR)

=== Singles ===
- 6 January 2006 : Donne (#2 FR)
- 26 June 2006 : Baby Can I Hold You (#33 FR)
