= Sinclair (singer) =

French singer-songwriter

- Birth name: Mathieu Blanc-Francard
- Born: 19 July 1970 (age 55); Tours, France
- Genres: Funk
- Occupation(s): Musician, singer-songwriter
- Years active: 1993–present
- Labels: EMI, Warner

Mathieu Blanc-Francard, known professionally as Sinclair (born 19 July 1970), is a French musician and singer-songwriter.

== Early life ==
Born in 1970 at Tours, France, as son of Dominique Blanc-Francard and brother of Hubert Blanc-Francard, known professionally as Boom Bass (of Cassius), Mathieu Blanc-Francard grew up in Paris and went to school at the lycée Janson-de-Sailly. He became interested in music as a teenager and missed his baccalauréat. He briefly worked in a recording studio as an assistant sound engineer and learned the guitar. At this time he formed his first band and chose his stage name.

== Career ==
=== Musical career ===
Sinclair's first album, Que justice soit faite ("Let justice be done"), was released in 1993 and recorded with his brother's help. In the recording he played all the instruments except the drums. The album sold 100,000 copies and was certified as a "golden disc". Sinclair gave a hundred concerts to publicise this album, including a performance at the New Morning nightclub in May 1993. For his second album, Au mépris du danger ("In defiance of danger"), musicians including Matthieu Chedid and Fixi of the group Java formed his group "Système Sinclair". His third album, La Bonne attitude ("The Good attitude"), on which he invited Manu Katché, sold 200,000 copies. Sinclair composed, arranged and produced his fourth album, Supernova Superstar, which came out in 2001.

In 2002, Sinclair composed the soundtrack for the film Mon Idole, directed by Guillaume Canet. In 2004 he released a new album Comme je suis 1992–2004 with title song Comme je suis ("As I am") and a compilation of his most successful songs. His sixth studio album, Morphologique ("Morphology"), was published in October 2006 by his own label, Mini Strong. In 2008 he directed (together with David Dahan) the music for a television series, Duval et Moretti. In early 2011, Sinclair signed a contract with Warner Music Group which released an eponymous album in May of that year. A single, Ça tourne dans ma tête ("It runs in my head"), preceded the release of the album.

On 16 June 2015 Sinclair announced on Facebook his return to the stage, which took place on 6 November 2015 at the Cargo de Nuit in Arles. He also played on 16 November 2015 at the Divan du Monde in Paris. In 2020, he launched the single Elle dit. In April 2021, the French singer launched an EP called Hier's efface.

=== Other activities ===
Sinclair was on the jury for seasons 6 and 7 of the TV series Nouvelle Star (broadcast by M6) alongside the composer, arranger and pianist André Manoukian, the journalist Philippe Manœuvre and the singer Lio. In autumn 2009 he announced his intention to withdraw, being dissatisfied with the musical standard of the 2008–09 season. However, in season 9 of Nouvelle Star, starting in December 2012, he returned to the jury with Manoukian, Maurane and Olivier Bas. In 2013 he produced an album Premières rencontres ("First meeting") for the singer Sophie-Tith Charvet, winner of season 9. Since 2017, he leads the programme Le Plein de Sensations on France 4 with Laury Thilleman and Laurent Maistret. He appeared in the eighth season of Danse avec les stars, alongside dancer Denitsa Ikonomova.

== Musical style and influences ==
Since his teens Sinclair has been particularly influenced by Prince, Stevie Wonder, Jimi Hendrix and Sly Stone. He describes his discovery of the album Songs in the Key of Life by Stevie Wonder as "a revelation".

== Awards ==
In 1995 Sinclair received an award in the Victoires de la Musique in the category "Newcomer group of the year". In 2002 his album Supernova Superstar won a Victoires award. The singer received a César Award nomination in 2009 for the soundtrack of the film Le Premier Jour du reste de ta vie ("The First Day of the Rest of Your Life").

== Personal life ==
Mathieu Blanc-Francard was born into a family of professional musicians and entertainers: he is the son of sound engineer Dominique Blanc-Francard who was a member of the rock group "Les Pingouins" in the 1960s. Mathieu's brother Hubert, known as "Boom Bass", is one of the duo Cassius.

In September 2001 Mathieu Blanc-Francard married the actress Emma de Caunes. They have a daughter, Nina, born in Paris in October 2002. They divorced in 2005 after eleven years together. The singer lived with the novelist Amanda Sthers from 2009 to 2012.

== Discography ==
=== Albums ===
1. Que justice soit faite! (1993)
2. Au mépris du danger (1995)
3. La bonne attitude (1997)
4. Supernova Superstar (2001)
5. Mon Idole (Musiques Originales Du Film) (2002)
6. Comme je suis (2004)
7. Morphologique (2006)
8. Le Siffleur (Musique Originale) (2009)
9. Sinclair (2011)

=== Live albums ===
1. Live (1999)
2. Live 2002 (2002)

=== Compilations ===
1. Comme je suis 1992–2004 (2004)
2. Best of (2008)

== Filmography ==
Year	Title	Director	Notes
2002	Whatever You Say	Guillaume Canet	
2004	Narco	Tristan Aurouet & Gilles Lellouche	
2004	Du bois pour l'hiver	Olivier Jahan	Short
2005	Love Is in the Air	Rémi Bezançon	
2007	Santa Closed	Douglas Attal	Short
2008	The First Day of the Rest of Your Life	Rémi Bezançon (2)	Nominated – César Award for Best Original Music
2009	Le siffleur	Philippe Lefebvre	
2011	A Happy Event	Rémi Bezançon (3)	
2011	Flics	Thierry Petit	TV series (4 episodes)
2012	Superstar	Xavier Giannoli	
2017	Mes trésors	Pascal Bourdiaux	

== Bibliography ==
- Sermet, Vincent (2008). Les musiques soul et funk: la France qui groove des années 1960 à nos jours. Logiques sociales (in French) (Éditions L'Harmattan ed.). L'Harmattan. pp. 153–155. ISBN 9782296058545.
