= Philippe Manœuvre =

French music journalist (born 1954)

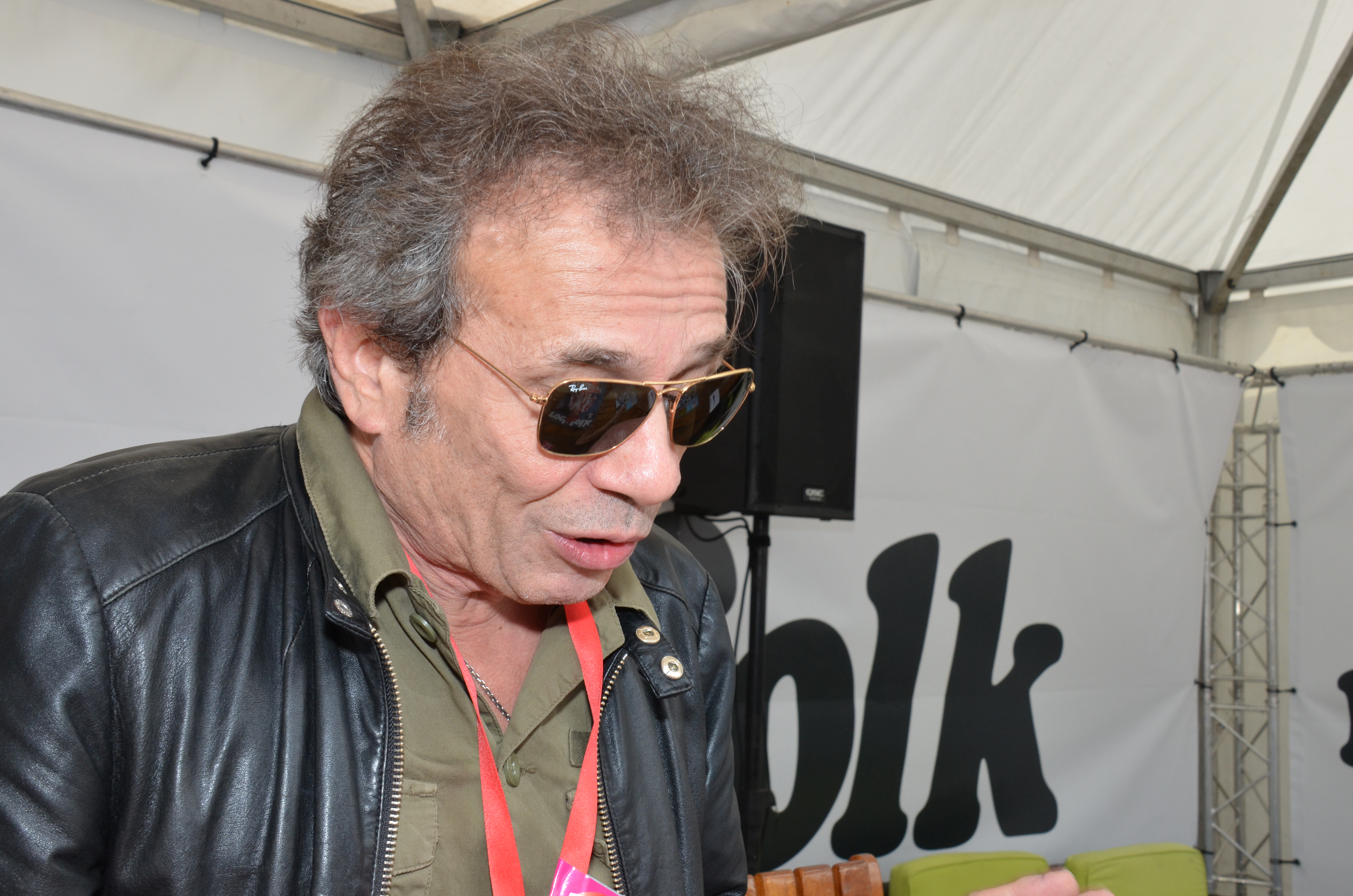
- Manœuvre in 2016
- Born: 19 June 1954 (age 72); Sainte-Menehould, France
- Occupation: Music journalist

Philippe Manœuvre (born 19 June 1954) is a French music journalist.

He has been a radio and television presenter, specialized in rock music. He has been editor-in-chief for the magazine Métal Hurlant and was the editor-in-chief of the music monthly Rock & Folk from 1993 to 2017. Since 2008, he was member of the jury of a reality show called Nouvelle Star on M6.

== Bibliography ==
- Philippe Manœuvre, L'Enfant du rock, Paris, Le Livre de Poche, coll. « Ldp Littérature », 15 octobre 1990 (ISBN 978-2253039761).
- Philippe Manœuvre, Dur à cuir (ISBN 2226087192).
- Philippe Manœuvre, Stoned : 20 ans de confidences avec les Rolling Stones (ISBN 2226078428).
- Philippe Manœuvre, Rock'n'Roll : la discothèque idéale : 101 disques qui ont changé le monde, Albin Michel, 2006 (ISBN 2226152091)
- Philippe Manœuvre, Rock'n'Roll : la discothèque idéale 2 : 101 disques à écouter avant la fin du monde, Albin Michel, 2011 (ISBN 978-2-226-20807-1)
- Philippe Manœuvre, Michael Jackson, Filipacchi, 1988
- Philippe Manœuvre, James Brown, Éditions du Chêne, 2007 (ISBN 2842777158)
- Philippe Manœuvre, Rock, Éditions Harper Collins, 2018

=== Collaborative works ===
- Philippe Manœuvre & Luc Cornillon au dessin, Antisocial, Humanoïdes associés, 1983 (ISBN 2731602058)
- Philippe Manœuvre & Luc Cornillon, La loi et Claude Dallas (ISBN 2246662613). (First radio comics broadcast in 1983 including in the radio show En Terre étrangère)
- Philippe Manœuvre & Michel Polnareff, Polnareff par Polnareff (ISBN 2246662613).
- Philippe Manœuvre & Joey Starr, Mauvaise Réputation (ISBN 2080689312).
- Philippe Manœuvre & Thierry Guitard, Être rock, Tana (ISBN 2845674260)
- Philippe Manœuvre, Philippe Lacoche & Christian Authier, Lady B, Le Castor Astral (ISBN 978-2859207021)
- Philippe Manoeuvre, Les enfers du Rock, Paris, Éditions Tana, 71 p. (ISBN 978-2845675551)
- Philippe Manœuvre, Agenda être rock 2010, Paris, Tana Editions, août 2009 (ISBN 2845675542).
- Philippe Manœuvre, Philippe Manœuvre présente : Rock français, de Johnny à BB Brunes, 123 albums essentiels, Hoëbeke, octobre 2010 (ISBN 9782-84230-353-2)
