= André Manoukian =

French composer, arranger and jazz musician

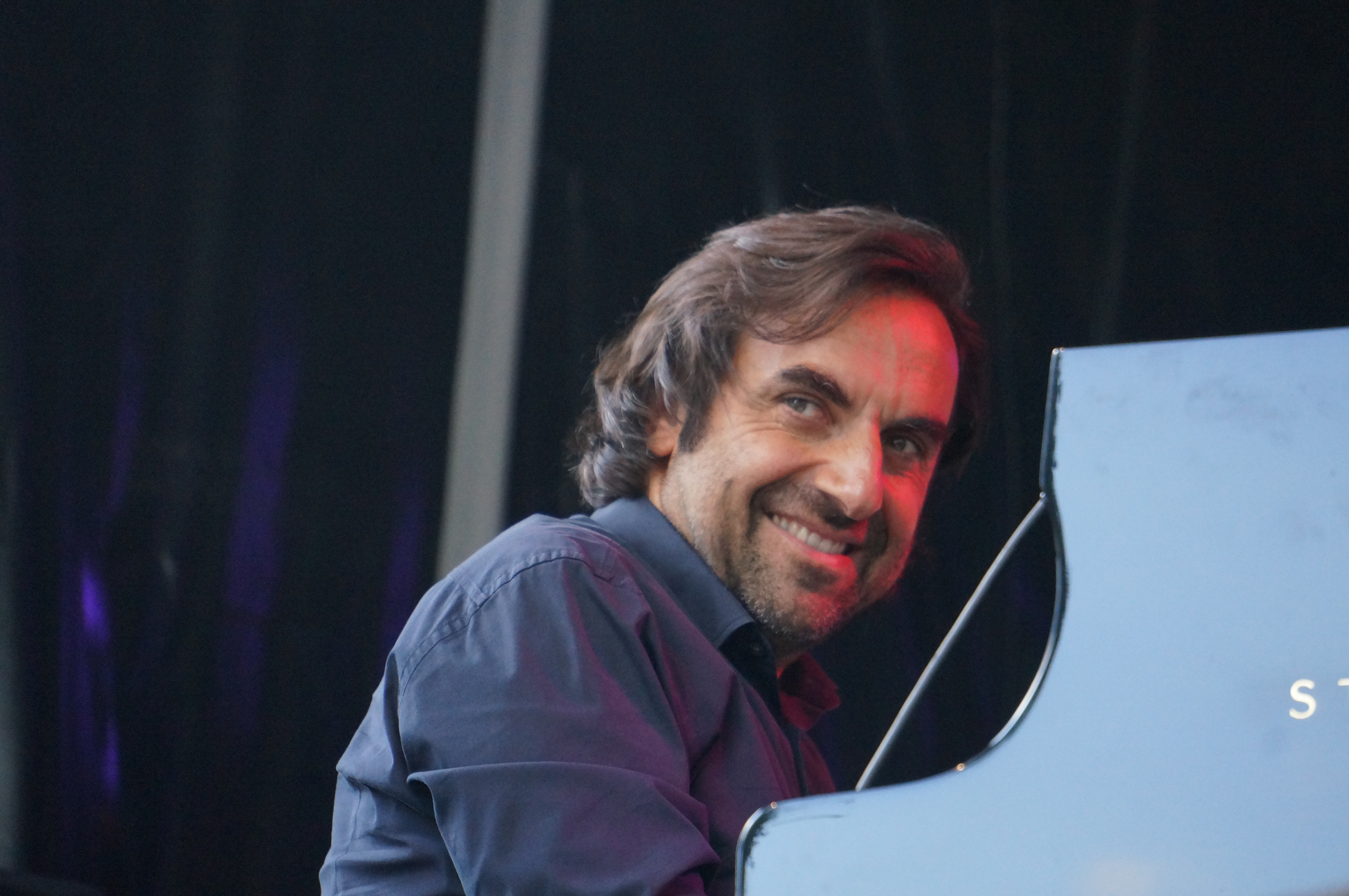
- Manoukian in Hermonville, 2014

Background information
- Born: André Antranik Manoukian; 9 April 1957 (age 69); Lyon, France
- Genres: Jazz
- Occupations: Composer; arranger; pianist

André Antranik Manoukian (Armenian: Անդրե Անդրանիկ Մանուկյան; born 9 April 1957 in Lyon) is a French songwriter, arranger, jazz musician and actor of Armenian descent.

== Early years and education ==
Born in Lyon, France, Manoukian is of Armenian descent. He began playing the piano when he was seven years old. Later, when he was a student, worked in a bank and then earned his living as a synthesizer and organ demonstrator in supermarkets. Due to heartbreak, he left France for the United States. At 20, he studied music at the Berklee College of Music in Boston. After the basics he studied musical composition, arrangement and harmony.

== Career ==
Upon returning to France Manoukian started a jazz band called Horn Stuff. At the same time he composed for female singers and two jazz-funk albums were recorded. He was also approached to join the band of the singer Michèle Torr.

In 1983 he met the singer Liane Foly and in addition to becoming her partner, he composed her first successes, including Au fur et à mesure and Doucement. He also worked for such artists as Richard Galliano, Charles Aznavour, Freddy Zucchet, Gilbert Bécaud, Diane Dufresne, Nicole Croisille, Natacha Atlas, Viktor Lazlo, Janet Jackson, Myriam Abel, Camille Bazbaz et Malia. He completed the musical arrangement and composition for films including Quatre étoiles et Jean-Philippe.

He is currently well known by the general public for being on the M6 reality TV series, Nouvelle Star (New Star). He has been on the jury since the first season along with Marianne James, Manu Katché and Dove Attia. During transmission he is the "poet" and philosopher juror. He is a member of the jury of Nouvelle Star series 6, besides singers Sinclair and Lio and the music journalist Philippe Manoeuvre.

In 2004 he did dubbing in the DVD bonus of Shrek II, where he dubbed one of the jurors of the singing competition.

He was also in the transmission of T'empêches tout le monde de dormir (You stop everyone sleeping) on M6 presented by Marc-Olivier Fogiel where he portrayed in his manner the "Psycho-erotico-cosmico-musical" of the guests by translating the name of a personality in shorthand notes with a melody which he composed and played on the synthesizer.

On 5 February 2007, Manoukian presented the Globes de Cristal besides Elisabeth Quin on Paris Première. Since 21 February 2007 he has presented Dédé les doigts de fée (Dede nimble fingers) on Paris Première, a program about guests who have different music backgrounds. For him, their life is a song recorded on a multi-track. To better portray his guests, Manoukian invites them to recount their lives in a real recording studio and he then composes a novel piece of music based on their stories. In the same year Manoukian composed the new Album (music) for Beverly, a contestant in Nouvelle Star 4 and he also accompanied Miss Dominique at the piano during some of her concerts.

His first book La Mécanique des Fluides (Fluid Mechanics) was released in February 2008. The book is an autobiography in the form of a monologue mainly tracing his artistic career as a pianist and a composer as well as his artistic and emotional life.

In 2011, he was one of the contestants during the first season of Danse avec les stars. With his partner Candice Pascal, he finished in the 8th position (last).

He joined singer Christophe Willem as a commentator for France 4 during the semifinals of the Eurovision Song Contest 2018 in Lisbon, Portugal.

Between 2002 and 2017, he served as one of four judges in the French version of Pop Idol, Nouvelle Star.

== Discography ==
=== Albums ===
Sources:

- Inkala (2008)
- So in Love (2010)
- Melanchology (2011)
- Apatride (2017)
- Les pianos de Gainsbourg (2021)
- Anouch (2022)
- La Sultane (2025)

=== Composer and producer ===
- The Man I Love – Liane Foly (1988)
- Rêve Orange – Liane Foly (1990)
- My Delicious Poisons – Viktor Lazlo (1991)
- Les petites notes – Liane Foly (1993)
- Sweet Mystery (English version of petites notes) – Liane Foly (1994)
- Yellow Daffodils – Malia (2002)
- La Chanteuse de bal – Liane Foly (2004)
- Echoes of Dreams – Malia (2004)
- Young Bones – Malia (2007)
- Cheyenne Song – Gaetane Abrial (2008)

=== Producer ===
- Lumières – Liane Foly (1994)
- Jazzaznavour – Charles Aznavour (1998)
- Faut faire avec – Gilbert Bécaud (1999)
- La Vie devant toi – Myriam Abel (2006)

André Manoukian has also produced albums for Richard Galliano.

=== Composer ===
- Translation of "Again" from Janet Jackson (1994)
- Épine de rose (lyrics: P. Grosz) – Diane Dufresne (2000)
- Ne dis rien – Julie Demne (2002)
- À quoi ça sert (lyrics: C. Bazbaz) – Gérard Darmon (2003)
- Éternelle – Nicole Croisille (2004)
- Haut les coeurs (lyrics: F. Deweare) – Natasha St-Pier (2009)

=== Movies ===
Manoukian made the music of several films.

- Les ténors, directed by Francis De Gueltz (1993)
- Four Stars, directed by Christian Vincent (2006)
- Jean-Philippe, directed by Laurent Tuel (2006)
- La grande boucle, directed by Laurent Tuel (2013)
- Fonzy, directed by Isabelle Doval (2013)
- Les yeux ouverts, TV Movie directed by Lorraine Lévy (2015)

== Filmography ==
| Year | Title | Role | Director | Notes |
|---|---|---|---|---|
| 2009–2016 | Fais pas ci, fais pas ça | Thierry Kalamian | Pascal Chaumeil, Philippe Lefebvre, ... | TV series (8 episodes) |
| 2010 | Profilage | Henri Salince | Christophe Lamotte | TV series (1 episode) |
| 2011 | Moi et ses ex | Thierry | Vincent Giovanni | TV movie |
| 2014 | Scènes de ménage | Piano teacher | Francis Duquet | TV series (1 episode) |
| 2014 | Piège blanc | Monsieur Mésange | Abel Ferry | TV movie |
