= Alexandre Varela Da Veiga =

French-American record producer, sound designer, artist and DJ

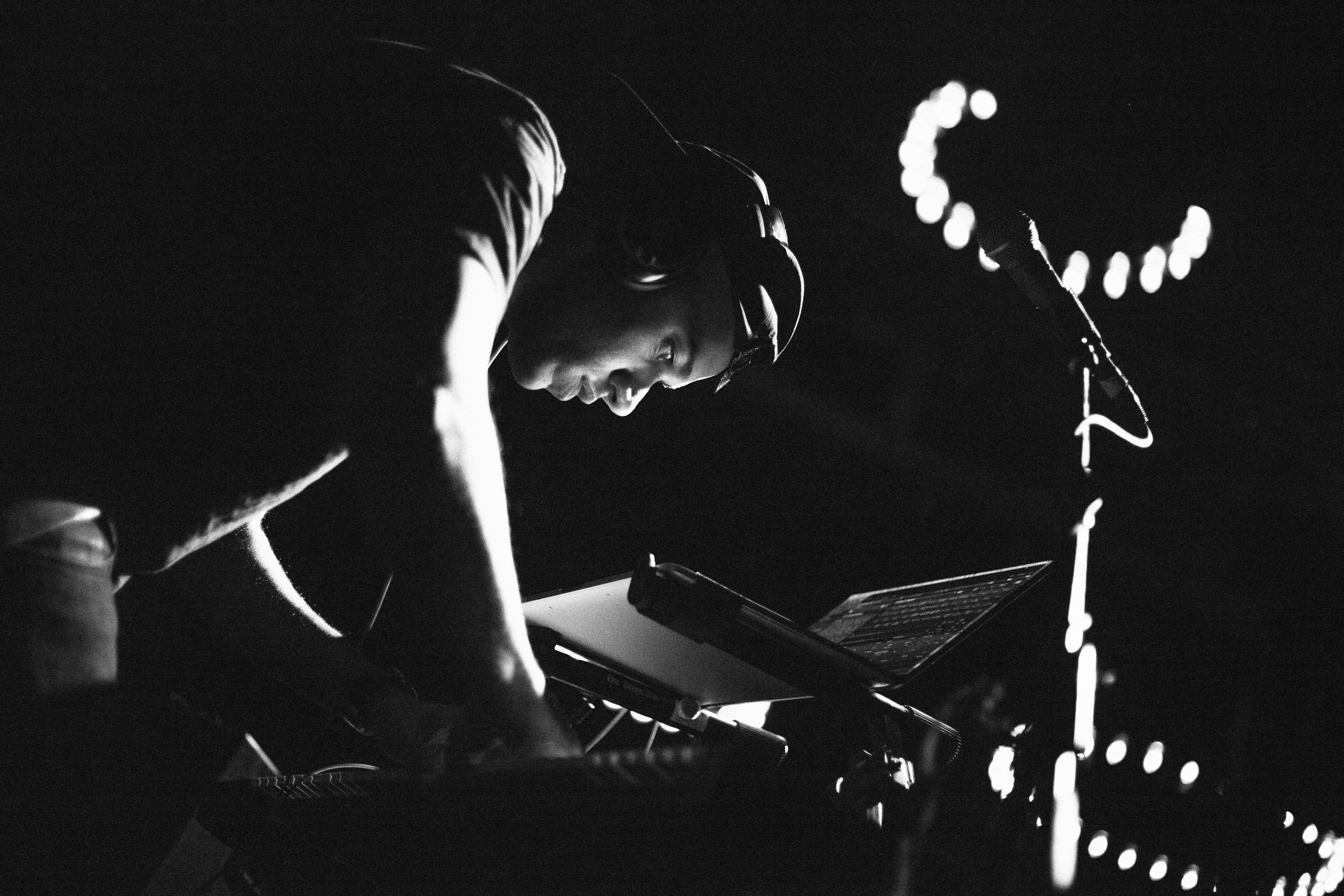
- Varela DJing in Philadelphia, 2017 (Photo by Bizzy Amore)

Background information
- Born: Alexandre Varela Da Veiga; June 6, 1979 (age 46); Toulouse, France
- Occupations: Record producer; Sound Designer; Artist; DJ
- Years active: 1992–present
- Labels: Universal Music; Columbia Records; V2 Music; Mayberry Music

Alexandre Varela Da Veiga (born June 6, 1979), also known as Diesel, is an award-nominated French record producer, songwriter, and artist. Born and raised in Toulouse, France, Varela began a rap career while in high school and is best known for his recordings with the group KDD, the first album of which came out when he was 15 years old. During the following years, KDD left its mark on French hip hop history after releasing a second album, “Resurrection”, considered by many rap fans a classic.

In 2000, at the age of 20 and after his third and last album with KDD, Varela shifted his focus to music production. He quickly gained recognition in the French music industry through his production work with French rapper Diam's on her album Brut de Femme. The album was awarded Best Rap Album in 2004 at the 2004 Victoires de la Musique ceremony. That same year, he also collaborated with artist and friend Oxmo Puccino by contributing to two of the album's titles, “L'amour est mort” and “Le Cactus de Siberie”.

In 2003, Varela moved to New York City to pursue his music production career. In a matter of a few months he started getting noticed by various music execs and landed his tracks on major artists’ projects. His big break came when he produced the song “Guess What” with songwriter Sean Garrett for the artist Keyshia Cole. In a few weeks the album sold more than one million records and become certified platinum by the RIAA.

In 2004, while riding the New York City subway Varela discovered a violinist duo, Nuttin' But Stringz. The two brothers find an artistic chemistry with Varela and decided to work with him as a producer. Upon releasing their first album “Struggle from the Subway to the Charts,” they gained exposure on TV shows and commercials aired on major US networks.

Varela kept collaborating with the group's youngest brother Damien Escobar after the duo parted ways, and released his solo album “Boundless” which was nominated for the NAACP Image Awards and held the number 1 position in the Billboard charts for the classical category in 2017.

In 2009, Varela produced an album for renowned French rapper and actor, Disiz. The album “Dans le ventre du Crocodile” received favorable reviews in the French press.

Varela is also a sound designer. His first experience in composing for movies occurred in 2003 when award-winning director Luc Besson selected some of his tracks for the movie Taxi 3. During the following years Varela will work on TV scores and eventually compose for fashion films and runway shows as a sound designer.

== Early life ==
Varela was born and raised in Toulouse, France. The son of a jazz musician, he will grow up in a musical environment that will provide the seed of his artistic inclinations. At the age of 11, he learned bass guitar after seeing his dad using the slap technique on a Fender Jazz Bass. At 13, Varela picked up piano after his sister brought him to a Prince concert, whose live performance impressed him so. A few years later he eventually picked up electric guitar after friend introduces him to the music of Led Zeppelin and Jeff Buckley. This multi-instrumentalist approach will define him and always remain a part of his sound.

=== KDD ===
At just 12 years old, Varela joined the rap act created by his older cousin, Dadoo. They had grown up together, and their natural chemistry was evident as soon as they performed their first live shows. Their group, KDD, will quickly gain national exposure after signing a deal with Columbia Records and releasing subsequent albums.

Varela was deeply affected by the loss of his mother, when he was just 17. The musical direction of the group shifted towards a darker and more grounded tone for their second album, Résurrection, which came out right after. The song “Une Princesse Est Morte,” written as an homage to Varela's mother, will become the most successful song in KDD's catalog.

At the same time the group socially conscious and strong lyrical content legitimizes them in the French musical map next to groups like Fonky Family, 113, or Oxmo Puccino.

Varela became much more involved in the production of KDD's third and last album, Une Couleur de Plus Au drapeau. He produced tracks like the song “Qui Tu Es?,” which showed early signs of production maturity and artistic freedom. The album was hailed by the press and allowed KDD to tour around France and the world.

In late 2000, the group separates and Varela moved to the United States.

== Music producer career ==
When his father brought home an Akai sampler, Varela, then 14, became obsessed with making beats and experimenting with sounds. He looked up to the sounds of famous American producers like Timbaland and the RZA, but also rap acts like Outkast and Mobb Deep. The musical environment he grew up in kept him open-minded and curious about music genres as sources of inspiration. For example, some of his tracks for KDD used samples from sources as varied and obscure as middle age folklore music (“Orange M”) or Brazilian classical composers (“Qui Tu Es?”).

=== Move to the US and Keyshia Cole ===
When Alexandre moved to New York City in 2003, he started sending out beat CDs to music execs, which helped him meet key players in the American music industry. A key meeting was with label owner and manager Ed Homes, who at the time was managing the careers of rapper Nelly, Ma$e, and R&B singer Amerie.

Holmes saw Varela's potential and offered Varela a management deal to begin to handle his career. Varela was then introduced to more A&R's and eventually connected with Memphitz Wright and Ray Romulus. This connection will prove instrumental in securing Varela's first major production credits in the US after they sent his music to Grammy nominated songwriter Sean Garrett. Varela and Garrett collaborated on the song “Guess What” for R&B singer Keyshia Cole in 2006. The album on which the song is featured sold 1.6 million units and made Varela one of the rare French music producers to contribute on a major R&V album in the US.

Universal Music offered Varela a publishing deal in 2007 as the result of this collaboration.

=== Nuttin' But Stringz and Damien Escobar ===
In 2004, while riding the A train in Lower Manhattan, NY, Varela discovered two talented brothers and their violins entering his subway car. At the time, Damien and Tourie Escobar were hustling and playing strings in the subway for money. Alexandre was so impressed that he invited them for a meeting in his recording studio on 44th Street. After connecting and playing some music to each other Alexandre started to work on what will become the duo's first LP: “Struggle from the Subway to the Charts,” blending elements of classical hip hop and R&B music to the violin. The album and the brothers’ raw talent will propel them on TVs biggest shows at the time: Oprah, Ellen show, Dancing with the Stars and America's Got Talent.

In 2006, the two brothers were invited to play in the White House for the US president where they will perform their title “Thunder,” which was produced by Varela. Later that year they will also win an Emmy Award for a segment about the group on MSG Network.

In 2009, after a live tour and being featured in several commercials, the duo decided to go their separate ways. Damien Escobar and Varela's relationship remained and proved to be instrumental in Damien's growing career. In late 2015, Varela and Escobar reconnected in the studio for a series of sessions that will provide the building blocks for Escobar's first solo album, titled “Boundless,” which released in 2017.

In July 2017, “Boundless” reached the number 1 position in the classical category of the US Billboard charts and remained at number 1 for several weeks. The record was also nominated for the 2017 NAACP Image Awards for Outstanding Jazz Album.

Varela is currently working on Damien Escobar's follow-up album.

== Sound design ==
In 2015, Varela created Mayberry Music, a sound design and music agency. Mayberry Music began with original compositions for the online broadcasts of major runway shows in Paris, Milan, and New York.

The sound design company has since grown to create original music compositions for fashion films and commercials for the luxury industry. It has provided original soundtracks for some of the world most celebrated houses, including Bottega Veneta, Estée Lauder, Mikimoto, and Tom Ford.

== Discography ==
=== Artist discography ===
Album	Year	Group	Record label
Opte Pour Le K	1996	KDD	Columbia Records
Resurrection	1998	KDD	Columbia Records
Une Couleur De Plus Au Drapeau	2000	KDD	Columbia Records

=== Production discography ===
Album	Year	Group/Musician	Songs
Resurrection	1998	KDD	4. Galaxy de Glace; 8. La Rhala; 9. Aspect Suspect; 12. Une Femme Tue Un Soldat; 13. Double Détente Symphony; 15. Orange M.
Une Couleur De Plus Au Drapeau	2000	KDD	1. Une Couleur De Plus Au Drapeau; 2. Qui Tu es?; 10. Pousses Les Limites; 11. Vie De Crev's
Cause a Effet	2001	K Special	3. Ou Est La Difference; 5. K d'Ecole; 7. Vulgairement Votre; 11. L'asphalte; 14. Louzde
Brut de femme	2003	Diam's	12. Amore; 14. Parce que
Cactus De Siberie	2004	Oxmo Puccino	15. Warriorz
The Way It Is	2005	Keyshia Cole	5. Guess What (feat. Jadakiss)
Gare Au Jaguar	2006	Joey Starr	5. Hot Hot; 10. Chaque Seconde
La France Des Couleurs	2007	Idir	3. Ce Choeur Venu D'ailleurs
Struggle from the Subway to the Charts	2007	Nuttin' But Stringz	1. Broken Sorrow; 3. Thunder; 5. Beauty From afar; 7. Suka 4 Her; 10. Egyptian in the Night; 11. A Nu Day
Pressee de Vivre	2008	Léa Castel	1. Melancolie; 2. Pressee De Vivre; 3. Derniere Chance; 4. Reviens moi; 5. Adieu Les Soucis; 6. Partout; 7. Bistrot Du Coin (interlude); 8. On Se Releve; 9. Quand l'amour Souffle; 10. Histoire d'Une Absence; 11. Tu verras, Tu verras; 12. Je Vois; 13. Melancolie
Venus	2009	Sheryfa Luna	1. Ce Qu'ils Aiment; 2. Si Tu n'etais Plus La; 3. Dis Lui; 4. Qu'est-ce Qu'on Attends; 5. Je Reviendrai; 6. Grandir Avec Toi; 7. Ne T'en Vas Pas; 8. Si Mal; 9. Respirer; 10. Interlude; 11. J'ai Le Droit; 12. On Progresse; 13. J'ecris; 14. Comme Une Blessure
Dans le Ventre Du Crocodile	2010	Disiz	1. Mutation; 2. Dans Le Ventre Du Crocodile; 3. Rien Comme Les Autres; 4. Yeah Yeah Yeah; 5. Je t'aime Mais Je Te Quitte; 6. Jolies Planetes; 7. Faire La Mer; 8. Trans-Mauritania; 9. Problemes XXX; 10. Les Monstres; 11. Paradoxe; 12. La Luciole; 13. Les equilibristes
Extra-Lucide	2012	Disiz	2. Combien de Temps; 4. Best Day
Single	2014	Damien Escobar	Freedom
Rap Machine	2015	Disiz	En Réunion; Un Jour J’ai fait un tag; Les 10 Commandements du MC
Boundless	2017	Damien Escobar	Overture ‘15; Phoenix; Mood Swings; Night Drive; Intermezzo; Get Up And Dance; Love Notes; Reflections; Lights; Power; Awaken; A Winter Night In Boston
