= List of number-one singles of 2006 (France) =

This is a list of the French SNEP Top 100 Singles, Top 50 Downloads and Top 150 albums number-ones of 2006.

== Number-one by week ==
=== Singles chart ===
| Week | Issue Date | Artist | Single | Download | Title |
|---|---|---|---|---|---|
| 1 | January 7 | Juanes | "La Camisa Negra" | Madonna | "Hung Up" |
| 2 | January 14 | Juanes | "La Camisa Negra" | Madonna | "Hung Up" |
| 3 | January 21 | Amine | "J'voulais" | Madonna | "Hung Up" |
| 4 | January 28 | Nolwenn Leroy | "Nolwenn Ohwo!" | Madonna | "Hung Up" |
| 5 | February 4 | Amine | "J'voulais" | Madonna | "Hung Up" |
| 6 | February 11 | Amine | "J'voulais" | Madonna | "Hung Up" |
| 7 | February 18 | Amine | "J'voulais" | Zucchero and Maná | "Baila morena" |
| 8 | February 25 | Zucchero and Maná | "Baila morena" | Zucchero and Maná | "Baila morena" |
| 9 | March 4 | Zucchero and Maná | "Baila morena" | Zucchero and Maná | "Baila morena" |
| 10 | March 11 | Zucchero and Maná | "Baila morena" | Zucchero and Maná | "Baila morena" |
| 11 | March 18 | Zucchero and Maná | "Baila morena" | Zucchero and Maná | "Baila morena" |
| 12 | March 25 | Pigloo | "Le Papa Pingouin" | Zucchero and Maná | "Baila morena" |
| 13 | April 1 | Pigloo | "Le Papa Pingouin" | Les Enfoirés | "Le temps qui court" |
| 14 | April 8 | Pigloo | "Le Papa Pingouin" | Les Enfoirés | "Le temps qui court" |
| 15 | April 15 | Diam's | "La Boulette" | Les Enfoirés | "Le temps qui court" |
| 16 | April 22 | Diam's | "La Boulette" | Rihanna | "SOS" |
| 17 | April 29 | Diam's | "La Boulette" | Shakira featuring Wyclef Jean | "Hips Don't Lie" |
| 18 | May 6 | Shakira featuring Wyclef Jean | "Hips Don't Lie" | Shakira featuring Wyclef Jean | "Hips Don't Lie" |
| 19 | May 13 | Pakito | "Living on Video" | Shakira featuring Wyclef Jean | "Hips Don't Lie" |
| 20 | May 20 | Pakito | "Living on Video" | Shakira featuring Wyclef Jean | "Hips Don't Lie" |
| 21 | May 27 | Pakito | "Living on Video" | Shakira featuring Wyclef Jean | "Hips Don't Lie" |
| 22 | June 3 | Pakito | "Living on Video" | Shakira featuring Wyclef Jean | "Hips Don't Lie" |
| 23 | June 10 | Crazy Frog | "We Are the Champions (Ding a Dang Dong)" | Shakira featuring Wyclef Jean | "Hips Don't Lie" |
| 24 | June 17 | Crazy Frog | "We Are the Champions (Ding a Dang Dong)" | Shakira featuring Wyclef Jean | "Hips Don't Lie" |
| 25 | June 24 | Crazy Frog | "We Are the Champions (Ding a Dang Dong)" | Gnarls Barkley | "Crazy" |
| 26 | July 1 | Crazy Frog | "We Are the Champions (Ding a Dang Dong)" | Gnarls Barkley | "Crazy" |
| 27 | July 8 | Crazy Frog | "We Are the Champions (Ding a Dang Dong)" | Gnarls Barkley | "Crazy" |
| 28 | July 15 | Cauet | "Zidane y va marquer" | Gnarls Barkley | "Crazy" |
| 29 | July 22 | Cauet | "Zidane y va marquer" | Gnarls Barkley | "Crazy" |
| 30 | July 29 | La Plage | "Coup de Boule" | Gnarls Barkley | "Crazy" |
| 31 | August 5 | La Plage | "Coup de Boule" | Gnarls Barkley | "Crazy" |
| 32 | August 12 | La Plage | "Coup de Boule" | Gnarls Barkley | "Crazy" |
| 33 | August 19 | Tribal King | "Façon Sex" | Gnarls Barkley | "Crazy" |
| 34 | August 26 | Tribal King | "Façon Sex" | Bob Sinclar | "Rock This Party" |
| 35 | September 2 | Tribal King | "Façon Sex" | Bob Sinclar | "Rock This Party" |
| 36 | September 9 | Tribal King | "Façon Sex" | Bob Sinclar | "Rock This Party" |
| 37 | September 16 | Tribal King | "Façon Sex" | Gnarls Barkley | "Crazy" |
| 38 | September 23 | Johnny Hallyday | "La loi du silence" | Bob Sinclar | "Rock This Party" |
| 39 | September 30 | Moby featuring Mylène Farmer | "Slipping Away" | Moby feat. Mylène Farmer | "Slipping Away" |
| 40 | October 7 | Faf Larage | "Pas le temps" | Faudel | "Mon Pays" |
| 41 | October 14 | Faf Larage | "Pas le temps" | Faudel | "Mon Pays" |
| 42 | October 21 | Faf Larage | "Pas le temps" | Faudel | "Mon Pays" |
| 43 | October 28 | Faf Larage | "Pas le temps" | Cascada | "Everytime We Touch" |
| 44 | November 4 | Faf Larage | "Pas le temps" | Cascada | "Everytime We Touch" |
| 45 | November 11 | Faf Larage | "Pas le temps" | Cascada | "Everytime We Touch" |
| 46 | November 18 | Faudel | "Mon Pays" | Fatal Bazooka | "Fous ta cagoule" |
| 47 | November 25 | Fatal Bazooka | "Fous ta cagoule" | Fatal Bazooka | "Fous ta cagoule" |
| 48 | December 2 | Fatal Bazooka | "Fous ta cagoule" | Fatal Bazooka | "Fous ta cagoule" |
| 49 | December 9 | Fatal Bazooka | "Fous ta cagoule" | Fatal Bazooka | "Fous ta cagoule" |
| 50 | December 16 | Fatal Bazooka | "Fous ta cagoule" | Fatal Bazooka | "Fous ta cagoule" |
| 51 | December 23 | Fatal Bazooka | "Fous ta cagoule" | Fatal Bazooka | "Fous ta cagoule" |
| 52 | December 30 | Fatal Bazooka | "Fous ta cagoule" | Fatal Bazooka | "Fous ta cagoule" |

=== Albums chart ===
| Week | Date | Artist | Title |
|---|---|---|---|
| 1 | 7 January | Indochine | Alice & June |
| 2 | 14 January | Fonky Family | Marginale Musique |
| 3 | 21 January | Natasha St-Pier | Longueur d’ondes |
| 4 | 28 January | M. Pokora | Player |
| 5 | 4 February | M. Pokora | Player |
| 6 | 11 February | Diam's | Dans ma bulle |
| 7 | 18 February | Booba | Ouest Side |
| 8 | 25 February | Diam's | Dans ma bulle |
| 9 | 4 March | Un Dos Tres | Un Dos Tres |
| 10 | 11 March | Diam's | Dans ma bulle |
| 11 | 18 March | Placebo | Meds |
| 12 | 25 March | Patrick Bruel | Des souvenirs devant... |
| 13 | 1 April | Patrick Bruel | Des souvenirs devant |
| 14 | 8 April | Les Enfoirés | Le Village des Enfoirés |
| 15 | 15 April | Les Enfoirés | Le Village des Enfoirés |
| 16 | 22 April | Les Enfoirés | Le Village des Enfoirés |
| 17 | 29 April | Les Enfoirés | Le Village des Enfoirés |
| 18 | 6 May | Les Enfoirés | Le Village des Enfoirés |
| 19 | 13 May | Red Hot Chili Peppers | Stadium Arcadium |
| 20 | 20 May | Pascal Obispo | Les Fleurs du bien |
| 21 | 27 May | Pascal Obispo | Les Fleurs du bien |
| 22 | 3 June | Sniper | Trait pour trait |
| 23 | 10 June | Nâdiya | Nâdiya |
| 24 | 17 June | Garou | Garou |
| 25 | 24 June | Garou | Garou |
| 26 | 1 July | Laurent Voulzy | La Septième Vague |
| 27 | 8 July | Laurent Voulzy | La Septième Vague |
| 28 | 15 July | Laurent Voulzy | La Septième Vague |
| 29 | 22 July | Laurent Voulzy | La Septième Vague |
| 30 | 29 July | Laurent Voulzy | La Septième Vague |
| 31 | 5 August | Laurent Voulzy | La Septième Vague |
| 32 | 12 August | Raphaël | Caravane |
| 33 | 19 August | Raphaël | Caravane |
| 34 | 26 August | Olivia Ruiz | La Femme chocolat |
| 35 | 2 September | Charlotte Gainsbourg | 5:55 |
| 36 | 9 September | Johnny Hallyday | Flashback Tour |
| 37 | 16 September | Johnny Hallyday | Flashback Tour |
| 38 | 23 September | Hélène Ségara | Quand l'Éternité |
| 39 | 30 September | Vincent Delerm | Les Piqûres d'araignées |
| 40 | 7 October | Renaud | Rouge Sang |
| 41 | 14 October | Renaud | Rouge Sang |
| 42 | 21 October | Yannick Noah | Charango |
| 43 | 28 October | Yannick Noah | Charango |
| 44 | 4 November | Bénabar | Reprise des négociations |
| 45 | 11 November | Bénabar | Reprise des négociations |
| 46 | 18 November | Michel Sardou | Hors format |
| 47 | 25 November | The Beatles | Love |
| 48 | 2 December | Bénabar | Reprise des négociations |
| 49 | 9 December | Mylène Farmer | Avant que l'ombre... à Bercy |
| 50 | 16 December | Bénabar | Reprise des négociations |
| 51 | 23 December | Bénabar | Reprise des négociations |
| 52 | 30 December | Bénabar | Reprise des négociations |

== Top ten best sales ==
This is the ten best-selling singles and albums in 2006.

=== Singles ===
| Pos. | Artist | Title |
|---|---|---|
| 1 | Faf LaRage | "Pas le temps" |
| 2 | Fatal Bazooka | "Fous ta cagoule" |
| 3 | La Plage | "Coup de Boule" |
| 4 | Tribal King | "Façon Sex" |
| 5 | Pakito | "Living on Video" |
| 6 | Diam's | "La Boulette" |
| 7 | Najoua Belyzel | "Gabriel" |
| 8 | Pigloo | "Papa Pingouin" |
| 9 | Zucchero and Maná | "Baila morena" |
| 10 | Faudel | "Mon Pays" |

=== Albums ===
| Pos. | Artist | Title |
|---|---|---|
| 1 | Diam's | Dans ma bulle |
| 2 | Laurent Voulzy | La Septième Vague |
| 3 | Les Enfoirés | Le Village des Enfoirés |
| 4 | Bénabar | Reprise des négociations |
| 5 | Olivia Ruiz | La Femme chocolat |
| 6 | Raphaël | Caravane |
| 7 | Renaud | Rouge Sang |
| 8 | Patrick Bruel | Des Souvenirs devant |
| 9 | Yannick Noah | Charango |
| 10 | Grand Corps Malade | Midi 20 |

== See also ==
- 2006 in music
- List of number-one hits (France)
- List of artists who reached number one on the French Singles Chart
