= Slimane (singer) =

French singer (born 1989)

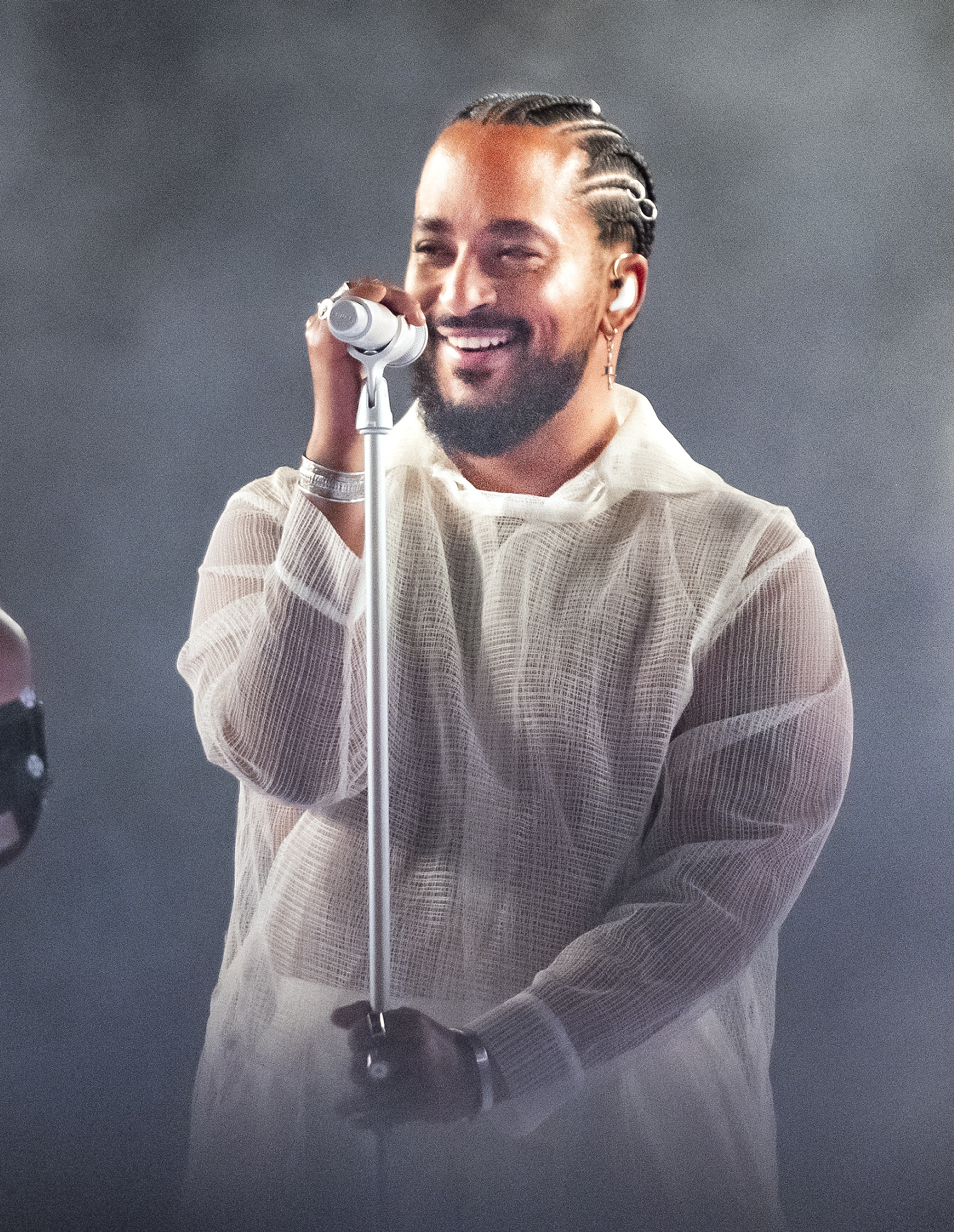
- Slimane in 2024

Background information
- Born: Slimane Nebchi; 13 October 1989 (age 37); Montfermeil, Seine-Saint-Denis, France
- Genre: Pop
- Occupations: Singer, songwriter
- Years active: 2016–present

Slimane Nebchi (French pronunciation: [sliman nɛbʃi]; born 13 October 1989), also known professionally by the mononym Slimane, is a French singer-songwriter. He rose to prominence after winning season 5 of The Voice: la plus belle voix as part of Team Florent Pagny.

As part of his solo career he has achieved over twenty-five chart entries on the French Singles Chart, including a number-one single as a featured artist with the song "Bella ciao". Nebchi has released four studio albums during his career with three of them peaking at number-one on the French Albums Charts. He represented France in the Eurovision Song Contest 2024 with the song "Mon amour", finishing in fourth place.

== Early life ==
Nebchi was born on 13 October 1989 in Chelles, Seine-et-Marne, France. He is of Algerian descent through his grandparents, who migrated to Paris from Biskra and Ghazaouet. He attended the Lycée Jehan in Chelles, later moving to Les Lilas, a suburb of Paris, where he worked for la société ATEED for a few years.

== Career ==
He started putting music online including own compositions like "Toi et moi", "Je n'y suis pour rien", "Salem" and "Amour Impossible" the latter as a duo with Princesse Sofia. Before the French The Voice, he took part in a number of music competitions; Nouvelle Star in 2009, X Factor in 2011 and Encore une chance in 2012 and in season 2 of Je veux signer chez AZ. He performed during Star Music Beach Tour in 2012 with Richard Cross.

In 2015, he obtained a secondary role in Didier Barbelivien's French musical Marie-Antoinette et le Chevalier de Maison-Rouge, which launched in 2017.

In 2016, at age 26, he auditioned for season 5 of The Voice: la plus belle voix singing "À fleur de toi" originally by Vitaa. All four judges turned their chairs, indicating in the gameshow they wished to take him through to the next round. He opted to be in Team Florent Pagny. On 14 May 2016, he won the title with 33% of the public vote, beating his fellow finalist, MB14.

In November 2023, it was announced that he would represent France in the Eurovision Song Contest 2024 with the song "Mon amour". He achieved fourth place in the final standings, in a pool of 26 contestants.

== Sexual harassment charges ==
On 29 October 2024, he was accused of sexual harassment by a technician during his tour in December 2023. On 18 November, it was revealed that a second sexual harassment complaint had been filed against him. In September 2025, he was found guilty, and fined €10,000.

== Discography ==
=== Studio albums ===
List of studio albums, with selected chart positions
Title	Details	Peak chart positions						Units	Certifications
Title	Details	FRA	BEL (Fl)	BEL (Wa)	GER	SWI	SWI (Ro)	Units	Certifications
À bout de rêves	Released: 8 July 2016; Label: Capitol; Format: Physical, digital download, streaming	1	116	1	—	4	1	FRA: 300,000; BEL: 10,000	SNEP: 3× Platinum; BRMA: Gold
Solune	Released: 26 January 2018; Label: Capitol; Format: Physical, digital download, streaming	2	—	1	—	8	1	FRA: 200,000; BEL: 20,000	SNEP: 2× Platinum; BRMA: Platinum
VersuS (with Vitaa)	Released: 23 August 2019; Label: Capitol; Format: Physical, digital download, streaming	1	78	1	99	6	1	FRA: 1,000,000; BEL: 20,000	SNEP: 2× Diamond; BRMA: Platinum
Chroniques d'un Cupidon	Released: 2 September 2022; Label: Noé; Format: Digital download, streaming	1	83	1	—	6	1	FRA: 200,000; BEL: 20,000	SNEP: 2× Platinum; BRMA: Platinum
Il faut que tu saches	Released: 4 December 2025; Label: Noé; Format: Digital download, streaming	3	—	2	—	16	28	FRA: 200,000	SNEP: Gold
"—" denotes an album that did not chart or was not released in that territory. "*" denotes an album that did not exist at that time.

=== Compilation albums ===
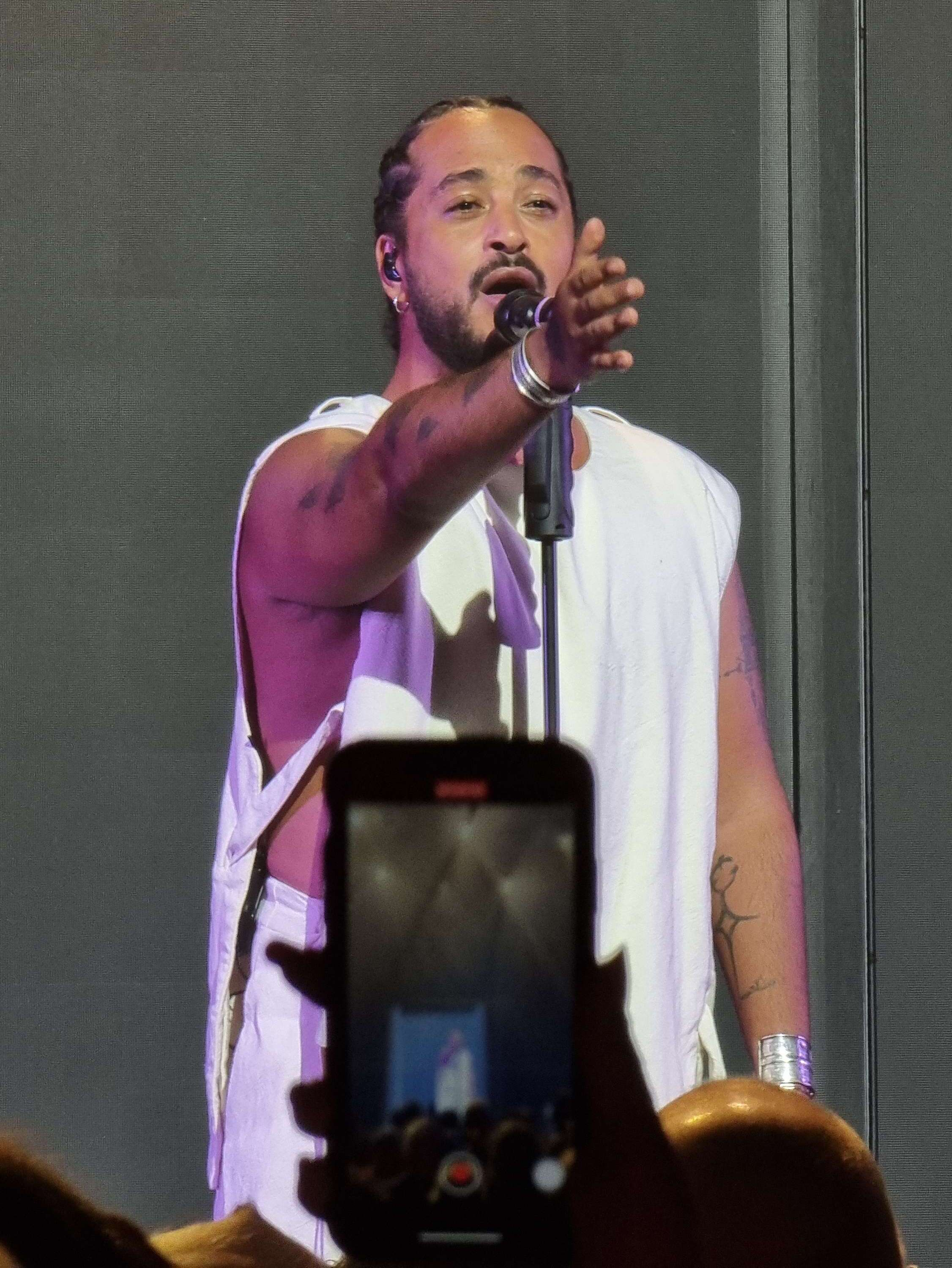
Slimane performing at the London Eurovision Party in 2024

List of compilation albums, with selected chart positions
Title	Details	Peak chart positions			Certifications
Title	Details	FRA	BEL (Wa)	SWI	Certifications
Essentiels	Released: 9 May 2024; Label: Capitol; Format: Digital download, streaming	1	3	16	SNEP: Platinum

=== Extended plays ===
List of extended plays, with selected details
Title	Details
Tourne le monde	Released: 5 April 2011; Label: Jasamara; Format: Digital download, streaming
Selfish	Released: 5 June 2026; Label: Noé; Format: Digital download, streaming

=== Singles ===
==== Charted and certified singles ====
Title	Year	Peak chart positions										Certifications	Album or EP
Title	Year	FRA	AUT	BEL (Wa)	FIN	IRE	LTU	NLD	NOR	SWE	WW	Certifications	Album or EP
"Paname"	2016	10	—	— (Note: "Paname" did not enter the official Belgian Ultratop 50 charts, but peaked at No. 2 on the Walloon Ultratip Bubbling Under 50 chart.)	—	—	—	—	—	—	—	SNEP: Platinum; BRMA: 2× Platinum	À bout de rêves
"Le vide"	2016	68	—	—	—	—	—	—	—	—	—	BRMA: Gold	À bout de rêves
"Adieu"	2016	75	—	— (Note: "Adieu" did not enter the official Belgian Ultratop 50 charts, but peaked at No. 9 on the Walloon Ultratip Bubbling Under 50 chart.)	—	—	—	—	—	—	—	SNEP: Gold; BRMA: Platinum	À bout de rêves
"Abîmée" (with Léa Castel)	2016	37	—	8	—	—	—	—	—	—	—	SNEP: Gold	À bout de rêves
"La famille ça va bien!"	2016	139	—	— (Note: "La famille ça va bien!" did not enter the official Belgian Ultratop 50 charts, but appeared on the Walloon Ultratip Bubbling Under 50 chart.)	—	—	—	—	—	—	—		À bout de rêves
"Frérot"	2017	163	—	—	—	—	—	—	—	—	—	BRMA: Gold	À bout de rêves
"J'en suis là"	2017	195	—	— (Note: "J'en suis là" did not enter the official Belgian Ultratop 50 charts, but peaked at No. 30 on the Walloon Ultratip Bubbling Under 50 chart.)	—	—	—	—	—	—	—	BRMA: Gold	Solune
"Viens on s'aime"	2017	103	—	10	—	—	—	—	—	—	—	SNEP: Diamond; BRMA: 2× Platinum	Solune
"Luna" (featuring Boostee)	2018	—	—	10	—	—	—	—	—	—	—	BRMA: Gold	Solune
"Nous deux"	2018	—	—	13	—	—	—	—	—	—	—	SNEP: Gold; BRMA: 2× Platinum	Solune
"Je te le donne" (with Vitaa)	2019	12	—	3	—	—	—	—	—	—	—	SNEP: Diamond	VersuS
"Versus" (with Vitaa)	2019	159	—	35	—	—	—	—	—	—	—	SNEP: Gold; BRMA: Platinum	VersuS
"Ça va ça vient" (with Vitaa)	2019	42	—	4	—	—	—	—	—	—	—	SNEP: Platinum; BRMA: Platinum	VersuS
"Avant toi" (with Vitaa)	2019	11	—	2	—	—	—	—	—	—	—	SNEP: Diamond; BRMA: 2× Platinum	VersuS
"Pas beaux" (with Vitaa)	2019	112	—	5	—	—	—	—	—	—	—	BRMA: Gold	VersuS
"Ça ira" (with Vitaa)	2020	178	—	20	—	—	—	—	—	—	—	SNEP: Gold	VersuS - Chapitre II
"De l'or" (with Vitaa)	2020	109	—	8	—	—	—	—	—	—	—	SNEP: Platinum	VersuS - Chapitre II
"XY" (with Vitaa)	2021	182	—	47	—	—	—	—	—	—	—	SNEP: Platinum	VersuS
"Belle" (with Dadju and Gims)	2021	36	—	—	—	—	—	—	—	—	—	SNEP: Platinum	Le fléau
"Y'a rien" (with Hatik)	2021	103	—	—	—	—	—	—	—	—	—		Noyé: vague à l'âme (Suite et fin)
"La recette"	2022	39	—	7	—	—	—	—	—	—	—	SNEP: Diamond	Chroniques d'un cupidon
"Des milliers de je t'aime"	2022	30	—	7	—	—	—	—	—	—	—	SNEP: Diamond	Chroniques d'un cupidon
"Chez toi" (featuring Claudio Capéo)	2023	110	—	19	—	—	—	—	—	—	—	SNEP: Platinum	Chroniques d'un cupidon
"Mon amour"	2023	2	45	4	47	76	8	37	53	24	144	SNEP: Diamond; BRMA: 2× Platinum	Essentiels
"Résister (What About Peace?)"	2024	161	—	46	—	—	—	—	—	—	—	SNEP: Gold	Non-album singles
"Première fois"	2026	—	—	48	—	—	—	—	—	—	—		Non-album singles
"—" denotes a recording that did not chart or was not released in that territory.

==== As featured artist ====
Title	Year	Peak chart positions			Certifications	Album
Title	Year	FRA	BEL (Wa)	SWI	Certifications	Album
"Promesse" (Patrick Fiori featuring Slimane)	2017	—	—	—		Promesse
"Bella ciao" (Naestro featuring Maître Gims, Vitaa, Dadju, and Slimane)	2018	1	13	41	SNEP: Diamond	Ceinture noire
"Les choses simples" (Jenifer featuring Slimane)	2018	183	8	—	SNEP: Platinum	Nouvelle page
"Safe Digga" (Mike Singer featuring Slimane)	2018	—	—	—		Deja Vu
"Dis-moi qui je suis" (Madame Monsieur featuring Slimane)	2020	—	—	—		Tandem
"A muntagnera" (A Filetta featuring Slimane)	2022	—	—	—		Corsu - Mezu Mezu 2
"Les murs porteurs" (Florent Pagny featuring Slimane)	2023	—	—	—		2bis
"Je t'offirai le monde" (Nej' featuring Slimane)	2023	—	—	—		Athena
"Je restes, tu continues" (Ycare featuring Slimane)	2023	—	—	—		Nos futurs
"Qu'est-ce que'on était beau" (Patrick Fiori featuring Slimane, Claudio Capéo, and Soprano)	2024	—	—	—		Le chant est libre
"Ainsi font" (Zacques featuring Slimane)	2024	—	—	—		Non-album single
"—" denotes a recording that did not chart or was not released in that territory.

==== Other singles ====
Title	Year	Album or EP
"Marie"	2017	Non-album single
"À fleur de toi" (with Vitaa)	2019	VersuS
"On My Skin" (with Vitaa and Camélia Jordana)	2019	VersuS
"Tu me laisses" (with Vitaa and Dadju)	2020	VersuS – Chapitre II
"Bref, j'ai besoin d'une pause"	2021	Non-album single
"Dans le noir"	2022	Chroniques d'un cupidon
"Peurs"	2022	Chroniques d'un cupidon
"Les roses du Bois de Boulogne"	2022	Chroniques d'un cupidon
"Sentimental"	2022	Chroniques d'un cupidon
"La vie est belle" (featuring Soprano)	2022	Chroniques d'un cupidon
"Les amants de la colline" (featuring La Zarra)	2022	Chroniques d'un cupidon
"Maladie" (featuring Lyna Mahyem)	2022	Chroniques d'un cupidon
"Zina" (featuring Manal)	2022	Chroniques d'un cupidon
"Mieux que moi"	2025	Il faut que tu saches
"Higher" (with Vanina)	2026	Selfish
"La chanson" (with Lara Fabian)	2026	Il faut que tu saches (Réédition)

=== Other charted and certified songs ===
Title	Year	Peak chart positions		Certifications	Album
Title	Year	FRA	BEL (Wa)	Certifications	Album
"À fleur de toi"	2016	12	— (Note: "À fleur de toi" did not enter the official Belgian Ultratop 50 charts, but peaked at No. 26 on the Walloon Ultratip Bubbling Under 50 chart.)	SNEP: Diamond; BRMA: Gold	À bout de rêves
"On n'oublie pas"	2016	192	—		À bout de rêves
"Je serai là"	2016	120	—		À bout de rêves
"Chez Laurette" (with Michel Delpech)	2016	137	—		J'étais un ange
"Fais comme ça" (with Vitaa and Kendji Girac)	2019	— (Note: "Fais comme ça" did not enter the French Top Singles chart, but peaked at number 45 on the French Singles Downloads chart.)	—	SNEP: Gold	VersuS
"Ne me laisse pas" (with Vitaa)	2019	—	—	SNEP: Gold	VersuS
"Hasta la vista" (with Vitaa and Gims)	2019	— (Note: "Hasta la vista" did not enter the French Top Singles chart, but peaked at number 104 on the French Singles Downloads chart.)	—		VersuS
"À la vie" (with Vitaa and Amel Bent)	2019	— (Note: "À la vie" did not enter the French Top Singles chart, but peaked at number 161 on the French Singles Downloads chart.)	—		VersuS
"Maëlys" (with Vitaa)	2019	— (Note: "Maëlys" did not enter the French Top Singles chart, but peaked at number 182 on the French Singles Downloads chart.)	—		VersuS
"Le temps" (with Vitaa)	2019	— (Note: "Le temps" did not enter the French Top Singles chart, but peaked at number 190 on the French Singles Downloads chart.)	—		VersuS
"Toi"	2022	—	—	SNEP: Gold	Chroniques d'un cupidon
"—" denotes a recording that did not chart or was not released in that territory.

=== Soundtracks ===
- 2015: Marie-Antoinette et le Chevalier de Maison-Rouge
  - "Tu penses à elle" (with Mickaël Miro)
  - "La terreur citoyen" (solo)
  - "La France" (with Kareen Antonn, Mickaël Miro and Valentin Marceau)
  - "La désillusion" (with Valentin Marceau and Mickaël Miro)
  - "Marie-Antoinette" (solo)

== Filmography ==
- 2016 – Léo Matteï, Brigade des mineurs as Raphaël
- 2018 – Break as Malik

== Television ==
=== France ===
- 2007 – Popstars (M6, 4 season) – candidate
- 2009 – Nouvelle Star (M6, 7 season) – candidate
- 2011 – X Factor (M6, 2 season)– candidate
- 2012 – Encore une chance (NRJ 12) – candidate
- 2016 – The Voice (season 5) (TF1) – winner
- 2018 – Fort Boyard (France 2) – candidate
- 2018 – La France a un incroyable talent (M6, 13 season) – participation in the jury of the second semi-final
- 2019 – Miss France (TF1) – jury
- 2019 – Boyard Land (France 2) – candidate
- 2023-2024 The Voice Kids France (TF1) – jury

=== Sweden ===
- 2024 – Eurovision 2024 – Finalist

=== Belgium ===
- 2018-2019 – The Voice Belgique (7 & 8 season) – jury
- 2020 The Voice Kids Belgique (season 1) – jury

== Philanthropy ==
Slimane has been part of the Les Enfoirés charity show since 2019.

== Notes ==
Awards and achievements
Preceded by Lilian Renaud	The Voice: la plus belle voix winner 2016	Succeeded by Lisandro Cuxi
Preceded by La Zarra with "Évidemment"	France in the Eurovision Song Contest; 2024	Succeeded by Louane with "Maman"
