= Dans ma bulle =

Studio album by Diam's
- Released: 6 February 2006
- Studio: Studio Davout (Paris, France)
- Genre: French hip hop
- Length: 1:18:25
- Label: EMI Music France
- Producer: DJ Maître; Elio; Pegguy Tabu; Skread; Tefa; Tyran; Zeano

Diam's chronology
Brut de femme (2003)	Dans ma bulle (2006)	S.O.S. (2009)

Singles from Dans ma bulle
- 1. "La Boulette (génération nan nan)" Released: 2006; 2. "Jeune Demoiselle" Released: 2006

Dans ma bulle (pronounced [dɑ̃ ma byl], translation: In my bubble) is the third studio album by French hip hop musician Diam's. It was released on 6 February 2006 through EMI Music France. Recording sessions took place at Studio Davout in Paris. Production was handled by DJ Maître, Tefa, Elio, Skread, Pegguy Tabu, Tyran and Zeano. It features guest appearances from Jacky and Vitaa.

The album debuted at number one in France and was certified 3× Platinum by National Syndicate of Phonographic Publishing, becoming the best-selling album in 2006 in France. It also reached number three in Wallonia and number 19 in Switzerland.

== Track listing ==
1. "Introduction" (Diam's, DJ Maître, Elio, Tefa) – 1:11
2. "La Boulette (génération nan nan)" (Diam's, DJ Maître, Elio, Skread, Tefa) – 3:51
3. "Ma France à moi" (Gregory Berthou, Diam's, Tyran) – 4:33
4. "Feuille blanche" (Diam's, DJ Maître, Elio, Tefa) – 5:19
5. "Jeune Demoiselle" (Diam's, Dr Swing, Yann Le Men, Luke) – 4:41
6. "Car tu portes mon nom" (Diam's, DJ Maître, Tefa) – 5:40
7. "Marine" (Diam's, DJ Maître, Tefa) – 5:40
8. "Dans ma bulle" (Diam's, Skread) – 5:15
9. "Par Amour" (Diam's) – 6:43
10. "Big Up" (Diam's, Street Fabulous) – 5:32
11. "Confessions nocturnes" (Diam's, DJ Maître, Elio, Tefa, Vitaa) – 6:00
12. "T.S." (Diam's, DJ Maître, Tefa) – 4:32
13. "Me Revoilà" (Bardelivien, Brown, Charden, Diam's, Matteoni, Zeano) – 4:46
14. "Cause à effet" (Diam's, DJ Maître, Tefa) – 5:19
15. "Petite banlieusarde" (Diam's, Skread) – 6:51

== Personnel ==
- Jerome Albertini – Photography
- Chris Athens – Mastering
- Amel Bent – Choeurs
- Jean Francois Delort – Mixing
- Pierrick Devin – Assistant
- Jean Pierre Dréau – Engineer, Assistant
- Marc Guéroult – Assistant
- Richard Huredia – Mixing
- Slim Pezin – Guitar
- Yann Le Men - Guitar

== Charts ==
Chart (2006)	Peak position
Belgian Albums (Ultratop Wallonia)	3
French Albums (SNEP)	1
Swiss Albums (Schweizer Hitparade)	19

== Certifications ==
Region	Certification	Certified units/sales
France (SNEP)	3× Platinum	600,000^{*}
^{*} Sales figures based on certification alone.

== See also ==
- List of number-one singles of 2006 (France)
