= À fleur de toi =

Studio album by Vitaa
- Released: 5 February 2007
- Recorded: France
- Label: Motown France
- Producer: Bernard Arcadio; Elio; Mounir Maarouf; Pegguy Tabu; Oz Touch; Philippe Weiss

Singles from À fleur de toi
- 1. "À fleur de toi" Released: December 2006; 2. "Ma Sœur" Released: April 2007; 3. "Toi" Released: May 2007; 4. "Pourquoi les hommes?" Released: October 2007; 5. "Mon paradis secret" Released: March 2008

À fleur de toi is the debut studio album by French singer Vitaa, released on 5 February 2007 by Motown France. It achieved great success in France, Belgium (Wallonia), and Switzerland.

== Background ==
À fleur de toi contains songwriting collaborations with Mounir Maarouf, Street Fabulous, Elio, and Kurser.

In France, five singles were released from this album. The title track "À fleur de toi" peaked at number 14 on the French Singles Chart and number two on the French Airplay Chart, followed by "Ma Sœur" and "Toi", which reached numbers 10 and 34 on the airplay chart, respectively. "Pourquoi les hommes?", the fourth single, peaked at number 41 on the airplay chart.

== Track listing ==
All songs written by Vitaa and Mounir Maarouf, except where noted.

1. "Prélude" (Vitaa, Elio, Kurser) – 2:00
2. "À fleur de toi" – 4:21
3. "Ma sœur" (Vitaa, Street Fabulous) – 4:48
4. "Pourquoi les hommes?" – 3:52
5. "En chanson" (Vitaa, Street Fabulous) – 4:09
6. "Ton autre" – 3:47
7. "Pour les miens" – 3:31
8. "Un mec comme toi" – 4:04
9. "Mon paradis secret" – 4:17
10. "J'oublierai tout" – 4:12
11. "Son propre ennemi" – 4:22
12. "Mon univers" (Vitaa, Street Fabulous) – 4:11
13. "Toi" – 4:30
14. "J'y crois" – 4:04
15. "Le Départ" – 5:53

=== Special edition ===
16. "Confessions nocturnes" (Diam's featuring Vitaa) (Diam's, Tefa, DJ Maître, Elio, Vitaa) – 5:05
17. "Pas cette fois" (featuring Soprano) (Vitaa, Street Fabulous, Soprano) – 6:35

==== Bonus DVD ====
1. "À fleur de toi" (Video)
2. "Ma Sœur" (Video)
3. "Toi" (Video)
4. "Pourquoi les hommes?" (Video)
5. "Un an avec" (Teaser) (Vitaa, Maarouf, Street Fabulous)

== Charts ==
=== Weekly charts ===
Weekly chart performance for À fleur de toi
Chart (2007)	Peak position
Belgian Albums (Ultratop Wallonia)	6
French Albums (SNEP)	1
Swiss Albums (Schweizer Hitparade)	16

=== Year-end charts ===
Year-end chart performance for À fleur de toi
Chart (2007)	Position
Belgian Albums (Ultratop Wallonia)	22
French Albums (SNEP)	10
French Digital Albums (SNEP)	41

== Certifications ==
Certifications for À fleur de toi
Region	Certification	Certified units/sales
Belgium (BRMA)	Gold	25,000^{*}
France (SNEP)	3× Platinum	600,000^{*}
^{*} Sales figures based on certification alone.
