= Je reste =

2011 song by Amel Bent

"Je Reste"

Single by Amel Bent

from the album Délit Mineur
- Released: 17 October 2011
- Recorded: 2011
- Length: 3:14
- Label: Sony Music Entertainment
- Songwriter: Benoit Poher
- Producer: Volodia

Amel Bent singles chronology
"Cette idée-là" (2010)	"Je Reste" (2011)	"Délit" (2012)

"Je Reste" is a song recorded by French singer Amel Bent as a lead single from her fourth studio album Délit Mineur released on November 28, 2011. The single was written by Benoit Poher, the singer of the band Kyo. Starring Amel Bent and Karl E. Landler.

== Composition ==
"Je Reste" is a mid-tempo ballad, which has a resemblance to Ryan Tedder's synthesised productions.

== Music video ==
The video was released on YouTube on November 6, 2011. It features French actor Karl E. Landler.

== Chart performance ==
"Je reste" debuted on the French Singles Chart at number 96 and peaked at number 29 and it peaked on the number one on the Belgian Singles Chart.

== Charts ==
Chart (2011–2012)	Peak position
Belgium (Ultratip Bubbling Under Wallonia)	1
France (SNEP)	29
