= La Boulette =

Single by Diam's

from the album Dans ma bulle
- Released: 21 February 2006
- Recorded: 2005
- Genre: French hip hop
- Length: 3:39
- Songwriters: Tefa, DJ Maître, Diam's, Skread, Elio
- Producer: Tefa

Diam's singles chronology
"DJ" (2004)	"La Boulette" (2006)	"Jeune Demoiselle" (2006)

Music video
- "La Boulette" on YouTube

"La Boulette" (pronounced [la bulɛt]) is the first single taken from Dans ma bulle, an album by Diam's released on 21 February 2006. La Boulette debuted at number 3 on the French music charts and stayed number one for three consecutive weeks. Containing numerous references to fellatio, incest and violence, some consider the lyrics to be somewhat vulgar if unfamiliar with the genre's conventions. In 2007, "La Boulette" won a NRJ Music Awards in the category 'Francophone song of the year'. As of July 2014, it was the 88th best-selling single of the 21st century in France, with 323,000 units sold.

== Track listings ==
CD-Single

1. "La Boulette (génération nan nan)" (3:39)
2. "La Boulette (génération nan nan)" (Instrumental) (3:39)
3. "La Boulette (génération nan nan)" (Video & Making of)

== Charts ==
Chart (2006)	Peak position
Belgian (Wallonia) Singles Chart	1
Eurochart Hot 100	2
French SNEP Singles Chart	1
Swiss Singles Chart	12

== Certifications ==
Region	Certification	Certified units/sales
Belgium (BRMA)	Gold	25,000^{*}
^{*} Sales figures based on certification alone.
