= Dadoo =

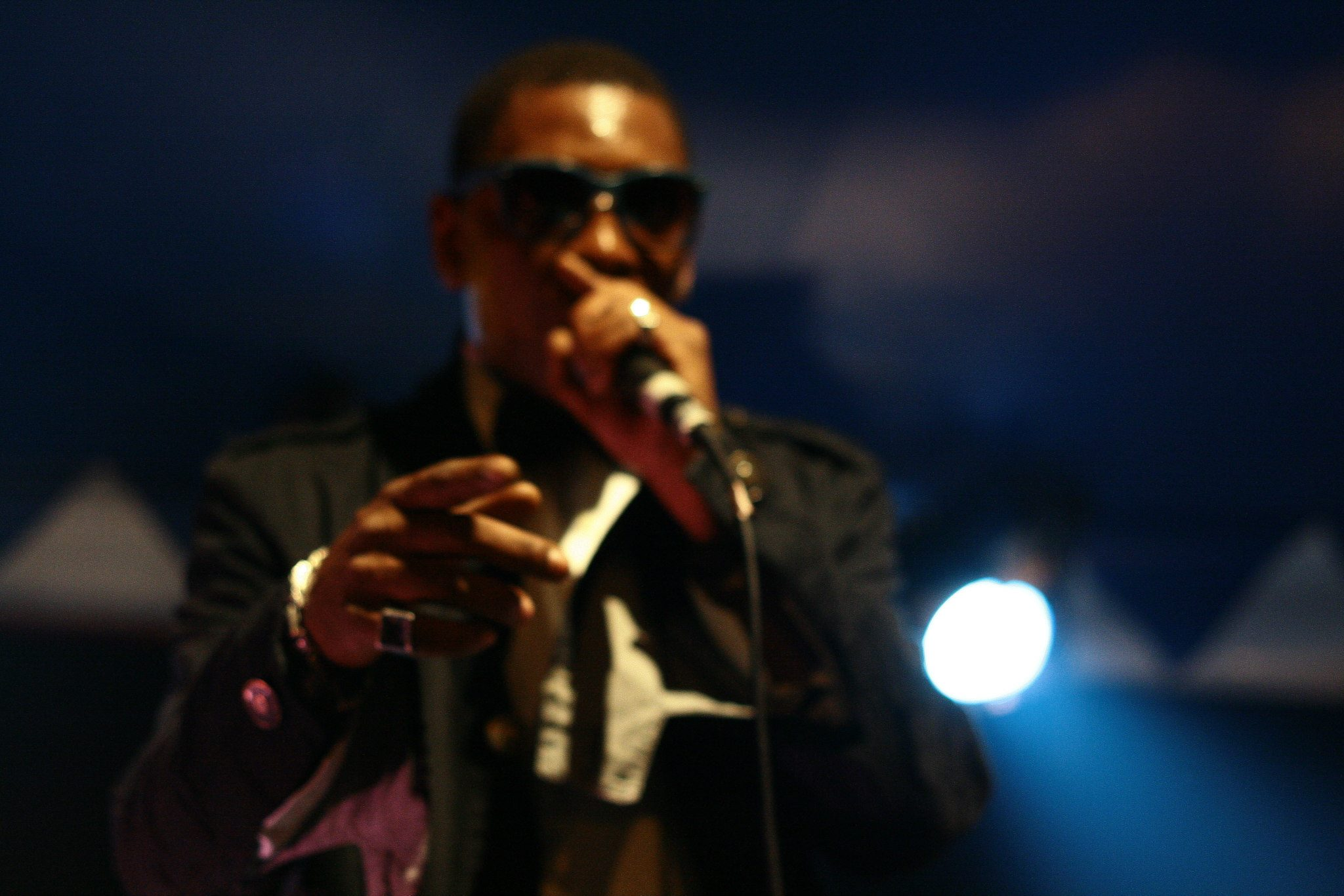

Background information
- Born: Mamadou Diouma Daniel Camara; 1974 (age 51–52); Marseille, France
- Genre: French hip hop
- Occupations: Rapper, singer, songwriter
- Years active: 1992–present
- Member of: KDD

Mamadou Diouma Daniel Camara (born 1974), better known as Dadoo (/dæduː/), is a French rapper and also a member of rap band KDD. He has performed several duets with singer Vitaa.

Dadoo competed in his second Lavaman Triathlon in 2015 to raise money for the Leukemia & Lymphoma Society.

== Biography ==
=== Beginnings with KDD ===
He was born in 1974 in Marseille, France. He started in 1994 with the group KDD and quickly became its leader. The group was made of five members (Dadoo otherwise known as Dadppda, Diesel, H2O, Lindsay and Robert) who signed a contract with Columbia. Their first album Opte pour le K came out in 1996; next came the album Résurrection in 1998 and Une Couleur de plus au Drapeau in 2000, both considered as original classics of French rap. Later the group separated after selling more than 200,000 albums. A new path was ahead for him.

=== After KDD ===
Dadoo quickly changed to a solo career. He initiated many musical projects and collaborations with: Akhenaton, Kool Shen, Rohff, Oxmo Puccino, Vitaa, Diam's, Joeystarr, even Jean-Michel Jarre for the remix of Oxygène. Dadoo, whose writing is the base of his solo career, wrote the script for Gomez et Tavarès, the story of two cops who are total opposites and must face the middle class of Marseille. The movie, produced by Gilles Paquet-Brenner in 2003, and will feature Titoff, Stomy Bugsy and Noémie Lenoir. Then, he co-directed the BO of Taxi 3 for Luc Besson, who saw rising stars like Diam, Vitaa, Corneille, Korr and Scalp. In the same year, he wrote for Alain Chabat the music for the movie RRRrrrr!!!, a wacky movie filmed in 2003, with les Robins des Bois. In 2003, produced by Sony Columbia, his first solo album France History X which is regarded as a definitive, high-value example of French rap. The album showed a timeless analysis of the French wealthy's differences and contradictions. The title Sales Gosses met an immediate success with a music video with Jamel Debbouze, Éric et Ramzy, Dieudonné and Joeystarr. The titles Où vous-êtes, France History X and Fille facile also saw large successes. It was in 2014 when Dadoo launched the formation of Dadoo and the Classics who hoped to blend hip hop strictly MC + KEYS + DRUMS.

=== Composition career ===
Dadoo, who gained more interest in composition, completed the first album of Joeystarr Gare au Jaguarr in 2006. The album was a clear success and was named in the victoires de la musique 2007 in the "Urban Music" category. As producer of the tour that followed the release of the album, Dadoo joined with Joeystarr on stage with the neo-metal group Enhancer. In 2009 his career took a turn as he became part of the new rock group "D and the Zepp". Dadoo became the singer/bassist and was accompanied by Alain "Dricks" Lasseube. At the same time, he wrote TV advertisements. Dadoo also tried successfully to produce with the producer Xavier Marchand's official teasers of Festival Garorock.

== Discography ==
=== Albums ===
- 1996: Opte Pour Le K (with KDD)
- 1998: Résurrection (with KDD)
- 2000: Une Couleur De Plus Au Drapeau (with KDD)
- 2003: France History X
- 2017: VANI THE GR8 (with KDD)

=== Featured on ===
- 1998

Driver Feat KDD, Dany Dan & Diam's – On fout le dawa on the album Driver, Le grand chelem

- 1999

KDD appeared on the 1999 maxi 16'30 contre la censure with Fonky Family, Sinistre, Akhenaton, Chiens de Paille, Mystik, Prodige Namor, Soldafada, 2 Neg, Yazid and Endo. Group members also took part in the collective album Liberté de circulation, notably on the track "Les p'tits papiers" with Diesel.

- 2000

‘'’KDD'’’ – Repose en paix sur compile Nouvelle Donne 2 ‘'’KDD'’’ – Pose pas d'questions on the album La Squale

- 2001

Akhenaton Feat Dadoo – Nuits à medine on the album d'Akh, Sol Invictus Dadoo Feat Kazkami – Les guerriers de la nuit on the album Première Classe Vol.2 Dadoo Feat Tandem & Busta Flex – Sport de sang on the album Mission Suicide Dadoo – Les ripoux on the album Mission Suicide Dadoo Feat Tandem & Tunisiano – Meilleurs vœux Part II on the album Mission Suicide Dadoo – Le grand show on the B.O. of the movie Yamakasi KDD – Red light on the album Sachons saying NON Vol.2 Oxmo Puccino Feat KDD – Balance la sauce on the album d'Oxmo, L'amour est mort

- 2002

Dadoo Feat Vitaa – Pas à pas sur la compilation Double Face 4 Don Choa Feat Dadoo – Sale Sud on the album Don choa, Vapeurs Toxiques La Boussole Feat Dadoo – Entrevue on the album la Boussole, Rappel KDD - Militant sur la compile Les militants Hors série

- 2003

Dadoo – Les 7 Q capitaux sur la B.O. du film Double Zéro Dadoo – Making off sur la B.O. du film Taxi 3 Dadoo Feat Diam's – Vivre sans ça sur la B.O. du film Taxi 3 Dadoo – Petite sœur sur la B.O. du film Taxi 3

- 2004

IPM Feat Dadoo & Diesel – Le mal en patience on the album d'IPM, 1 pied dans l'biz Dadoo – Ding Ding sur the album de RRRrrrr!!! Dadoo – 100 toi sur the album Bâtiment B : Hommage.

- 2005

Dadoo – Parce Qu'on a Le Blues sur la compile Illicite Projet Dadoo Feat Acid & Perverted Monks – We Flow sur la compile The Basement Kool Shen Feat Dadoo & Rohff – L'avenir est à nous sur le maxi L'avenir est à nous Lady Laistee Feat Dadoo – Corda on the album Lady Laistee, Second souffle Lady Laistee Feat Dadoo – Le monde d'aujourd'hui on the album Lady Laistee, Second souffle Lady Laistee Feat Dadoo – Si peu de choses on the album Lady Laistee, Second souffle Jeff Le Nerf Feat Dadoo – IV my People music on the album IV my People, IV my People Mission

- 2006

JoeyStarr Feat Dadoo – 93 Déboule on the album JoeyStarr, Gare au jaguarr

- 2008

Enhancer Feat Dadoo – 4444 on the album Enhancer, Désobéir

- 2015

Jeune Ras Feat Dadoo – Rouler tout la nuit sur le EP de Jeune Ras, 3h du mat
