= Amel Bent =

French singer

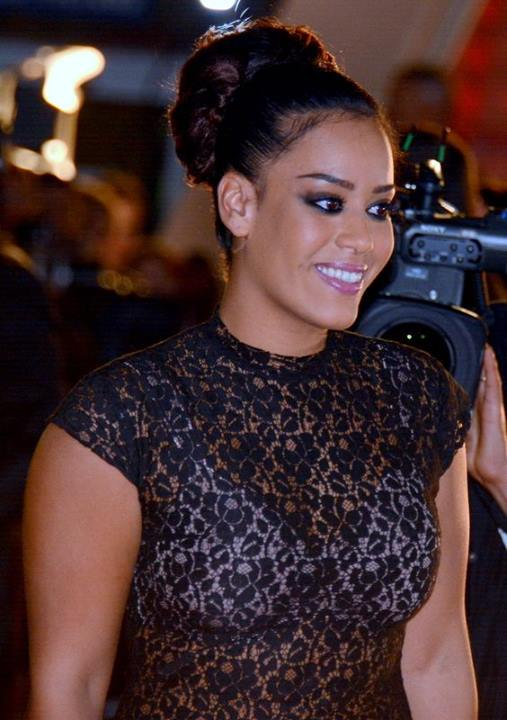
- Bent in 2013

Background information
- Born: Amel Bent Bachir; 21 June 1985 (age 41); Paris, France
- Genres: Pop; R&B; soul; urban pop
- Occupation: Singer
- Years active: 2004–present
- Labels: Sony BMG, Universal

Amel Bent Bachir (Arabic: آمال بنت بشير; born 21 June 1985), better known by her stage name Amel Bent (French pronunciation: [a.mɛl bɛnt]), is a French-Algerian pop singer who gained fame after reaching the semi-finals of season 2 of French TV singing competition Nouvelle Star. She is best-selling artist to come from that competition.

From 2018 to 2019, Bent was a coach on The Voice Kids France. She was also a coach on The Voice France from 2020 to 2023, and again in 2026.

== Biography ==
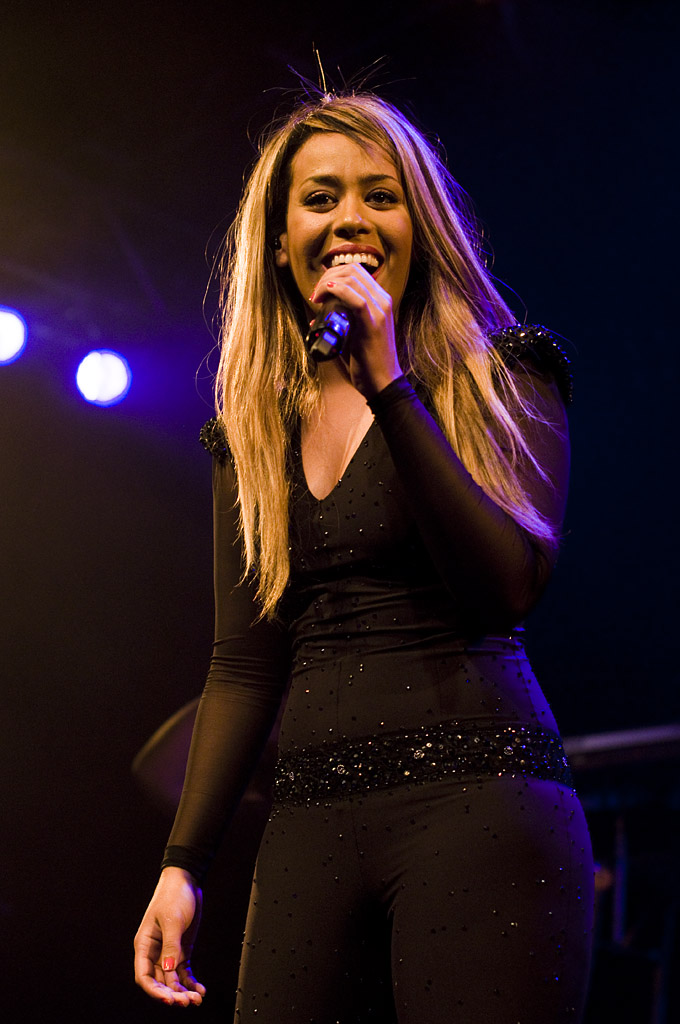
Bent performing in 2010

Amel Bent grew up in the Paris suburb of La Courneuve with her Algerian father and Moroccan mother. She has a brother and a sister. Her career jump started after making it to the semi-finals of the reality TV show Nouvelle Star 2, France's version of Pop Idol. Although her performance did not make it to the finals, she was still noticed by some of the show's producers, and would end up making her début album later that year, titled: Un Jour d'été, released in late 2004. The album would sell more than 550,000 copies in France alone, but the success of the album would ultimately be derived from the single "Ma philosophie", which would sell more than 500,000 copies, staying at the No. 1 slot in France for more than six weeks during and after sales.

In 2012, Bent was one of the contestants during the Third Season of Danse avec les stars. She and her partner Christophe Licata finished in second place, but won the celebrity dancing show's Christmas special.

For her single "Je reste" 2011, Bent co-starred with the actor from Metal Hurlant Chronicles Karl E. Landler.

== Discography ==
=== Albums ===
Year	Album	Peak position			French certification
Year	Album	FR	BEL (Wa)	SWI	French certification
2004	Un Jour d'été	3	12	39	Platinum
2007	À 20 ans	4	15	24	Platinum
2009	Où je vais	9	25	65	Platinum
2011	Délit mineur	24	61	—	Gold
2014	Instinct	11	14	24	
2019	Demain	12	13	55	
2021	Sorøre (with Camélia Jordana and Vitaa)	13	13	46	
2021	Vivante	1	7	41	Gold
2025	Minuit une	29	121	—	

=== Singles ===
Year	Single	Peak position		French certification	Album
Year	Single	FR	BEL (Wa)	French certification	Album
2004	"Ma philosophie"	1	1	Diamond	Un Jour d'été
2005	"Le droit à l'erreur"	7	16	Silver	Un Jour d'été
2005	"Ne retiens pas tes larmes"	5	5	Gold	Un Jour d'été
2006	"Eye of the Tiger"	2	13	Silver	Un Jour d'été
2007	"Nouveau Français"	3	7	Silver	À 20 ans
2007	"À 20 ans" (feat. Diam's)	—	13 (Ultratip*)		À 20 ans
2008	"Tu n'es plus là"	—	40		À 20 ans
2008	"Désolée"	—	—		À 20 ans
2009	"Où je vais"	—	23		Où je vais
2010	"Le mal de toi"	—	—		Où je vais
2010	"Je me sens bien"	—	19 (Ultratip*)		Où je vais
2010	"Cette Idée-là"	92	31 (Ultratip*)		Où je vais
2011	"Je reste"	29	1 (Ultratip*)		Délit mineur
2012	"Délit"	38	27		Délit mineur
2012	"Ma chance"	106	2 (Ultratip*)		Instinct
2012	"Comme toi"	91	—		Instinct
2012	"Quand la musique est bonne" (with Soprano)	40	5 (Ultratip*)		Génération Goldman Vol. 2
2013	"Sans toi"	131	5 (Ultratip*)		Instinct
2014	"Regarde-nous"	118	8 (Ultratip*)		Instinct
2014	"En silence"	164	—		Instinct
2019	"Demain"	—	45 (Ultratip*)		
2020	"Jusqu'au bout" (with Imen Es)	47	6		
2020	"1-2-3" (with Hatik)	8	3		
2021	"Le chant des colombes"	139	16		
2021	"Ma sœur" (with Camélia Jordan and Vitaa)	159	—		Sorøre
2022	"Lossa" (with Benny Adam)	—	39		
"—" denotes releases that did not chart or were not released in that country.

*Did not appear in the official Belgian Ultratop 50 charts, but rather in the bubbling under Ultratip charts.

=== As featured artist ===
Year	Single	Peak position
Year	Single	FR
2007	"Tombé pour elle" (La Fouine featuring Amel Bent)	15
2012	"Entre nous" (with Garou, Ségara, Luce and Goldman)	171
2013	"Karl" (La Fouine featuring Amel Bent)	158
2013	"Ti amo t'es à moi" (Rohff with Amel Bent)	94
2013	"C'est moi" (with Bruel, Aubert, Grégoire, M. Pokora and Goldman)	160
2014	"Le loup d'la street" (Lacrim featuring Amel Bent)	171
2017	"100%" (Alonzo featuring Amel Bent)	102

*Did not appear in the official Belgian Ultratop 50 charts, but rather in the bubbling under Ultratip charts.

== Awards ==
- 2005 : Nominated at the MTV Europe Music Awards like Best French Act
- 2006 : Nominated at the NRJ Music Award like Francophone Revelation of the Year
- 2006 : Win the European Border Breakers Award of The Best French Act
- 2006 : Win the Victoires de la Musique of The Revelation of the Year
- 2008 : Nominated at the NRJ Music Award like Francophone Female Artist of the Year
- 2010 : Nominated at the NRJ Music Award like Francophone Female Artist of the Year
- 2013 : Nominated at the NRJ Music Award like Francophone Female Artist of the Year

== Filmography ==
Year	Title	Role	Director	Notes
2013	Scènes de ménage	Amel	Francis Duquet	TV series (2 Episodes)
2021	Les Sandales blanches	Malika Bellaribi	Christian Faure	TV serie

== Sources ==
- http://www.last.fm/music/Amel+Bent
- http://influence.over-blog.com/article-10167534.html
