= Karl E. Landler =

French actor and filmmaker

- Occupations: Actor, filmmaker

Karl E. Landler is a French actor, filmmaker who stars in French and American TV shows and films, best known for his role in the science fiction TV series Métal Hurlant Chronicles. He is also the face of numerous worldwide campaigns such as Shiseido by Jean-Paul Goude and Red Steel 2 for Ubisoft. Landler is also a free runner in parkour and a stuntman, who has worked many times with Luc Besson.

== Career ==
=== Feature films ===
He has twice worked with Jean-Marc Barr and Pascal Arnold. He played Paul, a simple minded sidekick, in Chacun sa nuit ("One to Another"), alongside Lizzie Brocheré and Arthur Dupont, and a small appearance in American Translation, again with Lizzie Brocheré.

In 2014, he co-starred in the American-French indie movie Layover with American actress Nathalie Fay, directed by Joshua Caldwell. Layover premiered at the Seattle international Film Festival (SIFF).

=== TV ===
In 2021, he starred as Lucas Bodin in the American romantic Christmas movie A Christmas in Paris alongside Daphne Zuniga and Rebecca Dalton. The movie has been distributed all over Europe and North America.

In 2016, Landler joined the cast of the French romantic comedy Une famille formidable, which is the longest-running TV show on TF1. He played Bruno Viguier, a member of the main family. His character came back after an absence of 15 years. Landler became a series regular at the end of season 13.

In 2014, Landler joined the international cast of the Syfy TV show Métal Hurlant Chronicles, which was sold in over 100 countries. He played the lead in Loyal Khondor, in which a loyal warrior, Khondor, seeks an elixir to cure his beloved princess of the dreaded "cold disease" alongside Scott Adkins, John Rhys Davies and Marem Hassler, and also starred in Second Son, in which two brothers battle for control of a kingdom with unique values about life and death. The film also starred Frédérique Bel and Dominique Pinon.

He played Robin Torrens, the killer, in the award-winning TV show Alice Nevers, in a two-episode prime time special for TF1. It was watched by over 6.9 million viewers when it premiered.

Landler portrayed Lt. Adrien Fontel, a former G.I. suffering from Capgras syndrome in the TV show Profilage. It began the new season with more than 7.7 million viewers, which was considered the highest-rated season premieres for the show. The episode, "Panic", was in official competition and won Best TV Drama at the first French International TV Festival in La Rochelle.

In France, he has acted in several successful French TV shows, with some of his episodes establishing prime time records and gathering awards.

He was the lead actor in the TV movie Les Fauves, produced by TF1. Karl played Virgil, an undercover cop in a mafia unit.

=== Advertising campaigns ===
Landler is the face of LAFUMA,well known as an outdoor clothing brand.

Landler's acrobatic skills led him to represent Shiseido in a worldwide print and video campaign shot and created by Jean-Paul Goude.

Landler also starred in an award-winning campaign for the French army, which premiered in theatres before the showing of the James Bond film Casino Royale and was shown for three years on TV and theatres before blockbusters such as Pirates of the Caribbean: Dead Man's Chest. His co-star was the César Award-winning actress Zita Hanrot.

=== Music video ===
He played the boyfriend of the NRJ Award winning singer Amel Bent in the music video for her song "Je reste". It topped the Belgian Singles Chart.

=== Directing ===
He co-wrote, directed and starred in the short film DuO alongside Marem Hassler, his co-star in Métal Hurlant Chronicles. DuO won Best Comedy and Best Actress and was nominated for Best Actor and Best Director at the Los Angeles Independent Film Festival.

== Trivia ==
He was honored at the first Chinese Oscars in Hollywood, the Huading Awards.
