= Un jour d'été =

Studio album by Amel Bent
- Released: 2004 / 2005
- Genres: R&B; soul; urban pop
- Length: 48:50
- Label: Sony BMG

Amel Bent chronology
Un jour d'été (2004)	À 20 ans (2007)

Un jour d'été is the debut album by French-born singer Amel Bent, released in 2004. It was successful on the charts (#3 in France), and even gained Bent a Victoire de la Musique in the category 'Revelation of the Year'. There were three singles from the album, all of them reaching the top ten in France: "Ma Philosophie", "Le Droit à l'erreur" and "Ne retiens pas tes larmes".

== Track listing ==
1. "Je suis" (Charbonnel, Devier, Gallerne) – 3:18
2. "Ma philosophie" (Bent, Georgiades, Mackichan) – 3:23
3. "Le temps passe" (Bent, D.R., Gallerne, Milan) – 3:14
4. "Le Droit à l'erreur" (D.R., Molondo, Welgryn) – 4:01
5. "Mes racines" (Bent, D.R., Kabala) – 3:38
6. "Ne retiens pas tes larmes" (D.R., Sitbon) – 3:43
7. "Pardonnez-moi" (D.R., James, Westrich) – 4:46
8. "J'attends" (D.R., Dufour, Welgryn) – 3:39
9. "Quand elle chante" (Bent, D.R., Farley, Mahy) – 3:59
10. "Auprès des miens" (Charbonnel, Devier, Gallerne) – 3:26
11. "Partis trop tôt" (featuring Kery James) (Foks, James) – 4:10
12. "Je me sens vivre" (D.R., Godebama, Kabala, Ngung) – 3:23
13. "Ne retiens pas tes larmes" (piano voix) (D.R., Sitbon) – 3:54

== Personnel ==
Adapted from AllMusic.

- Jean-Marc Apap – Strings
- Isabelle Baleanu – assistant
- Jean-Marc Benaïs – Guitar
- Amel Bent – adaptation, choeurs, primary artist
- Melissa Bent – choeurs
- Jean-François Berger – Clavier, Fender Rhodes, Programming, Realization
- Vincent Creusot – assistant
- Jean Yves d'Angelo – fender rhodes, piano
- G.M. Farley & The Great Wear Family – composer
- Matthias Froidefond – assistant
- Kéry James – primary artist, realization
- Jean-marc lubrano – Photography
- Blair Mackichan – composer
- Anthony Marciano – musical direction
- Laure Milan – choeurs
- Christophe Morin – strings
- Lyonel Schmit – string arrangements, strings
- Franck Sitbon – arranger, piano
- Laurent Vernerey – basse
- Volodia – arranger, clavier, engineer, mixing, programming, realization, vocal director

== Charts ==
Chart (2004/07)	Peak position
Belgian (Wallonia) Albums Chart	12
French Albums Chart	3
Swiss Albums Chart	39

End of year chart (2004)	Position
French Albums Chart	168
End of the year chart (2005)	Position
Belgian (Wallonia) Albums Chart	33
French Albums Chart	14
End of the year chart (2006)	Position
Belgian (Wallonia) Albums Chart	94

== Certifications ==
Country	Certification	Date	Sales certified	Physical sales
Belgium (Wallonia)	Gold	May 6, 2006	20,000	
France	Platinum	2005	300,000	532,000

== Release history ==
Date	Label	Country	Format	Catalog
November 30, 2004	BMG / Jive	Belgium, France, Switzerland	CD	0828766580624
May 11, 2007	Sony / Epic	Belgium, France, Switzerland	CD	0886970794626
