= Ma philosophie =

Single by Amel Bent

from the album Un Jour d'été
- Released: 29 November 2004
- Recorded: France
- Genre: R&B; pop
- Length: 3:26
- Label: Sony BMG
- Songwriters: Blair MacKichan, Diam's
- Producers: Volodia, Jean-François Berger

Amel Bent singles chronology
"Ma philosophie" (2004)	"La Droit à l'erreur" (2005)

Music video
- "Ma philosophie" on YouTube

Audio sample
- Amel Bent - "Ma Philosophie": file; help

"Ma philosophie" is a song recorded by Amel Bent as her debut single, from her debut album Un jour d'été. It was released on 29 November 2004 in France, and remains the singer's most successful song, topping the charts in France and Belgium (Wallonia).

== Lyrics, music and video ==
The music was written by Blair MacKichan; Amel Bent and Diam's wrote the lyrics, which tell the struggles and aspirations of Bent as a young woman of color in France.

The music video deals with the various types of women and shows Amel Bent alternately as a businesswoman, a materialistic woman, a waitress and a daily woman who is with her friends. The lyrics have a quasi-poetic feel to them, as figurative language is sparsely used, such as the metaphor "Je suis l’as qui bat le roi" and the alliteration of the "i" sound in "injures incessantes". "My Philosophy" was named the Victoires de la Musique as 'Original song of the Year'.

The song was covered by Karen Mulder, Corneille, Lorie, Sandrine Kiberlain, Julie Zenatti and Hélène Ségara for Les Enfoirés' album 2006: Le Village des Enfoirés (seventh track). The song has been parodied by Paral & Piped studio, under the title "Ma Seule Envie".

== Chart performances ==
In France, the single went straight to number one SNEP Singles Chart on 23 January 2005, staying there for six consecutive weeks. It remained for 12 weeks in the top ten, then did not stop to drop quickly on the chart, totaling 15 in the top 50 and 18 weeks on the chart (top 100). It was ranked third on the Annual Chart and achieved Diamond status. As of August 2014, the song was the 18th best-selling single of the 21st century in France, with 569,000 units sold.

The single featured for 24 weeks on the Ultratop 40, from 19 February 2005. It debuted at number 21, then climbed to number three and reached number one during the following weeks, staying there for seven consecutive weeks. It appeared in the top ten for 16 weeks, was certified Gold disc, and was the third best-selling single of 2004.

== Track listings ==
- CD single
1. "Ma philosophie" — 3:26
2. "As" with Julien Chagnon — 4:36
- Digital download
1. "Ma philosophie" — 3:26
2. "As" with Julien Chagnon — 4:36

== Charts and sales ==
=== Weekly charts ===
Chart (2004)	Peak position
Belgium (Flanders) (Ultratop Singles Chart)	14
Belgium (Wallonia) (Ultratop 50 Singles Chart)	1
CIS Airplay (TopHit)	4
Europe (Eurochart Hot 100)	3
France (SNEP Singles Charts)	1
Poland (Polish Airplay Charts)	3
Russia Airplay (TopHit)	2
Switzerland (Swiss Hitparade)	16

=== Year-end charts ===
Chart (2005)	Position
Belgian (Wallonia) Singles Chart	3
CIS (Tophit)	5
Europe (Eurochart Hot 100)	21
French Singles Chart	3
Russia Airplay (TopHit)	3
Swiss Singles Chart	66

=== Decade-end charts ===
Decade-end chart performance for "Ma philosophie"
Chart (2000–2009)	Position
Russia Airplay (TopHit)	74

=== Certifications ===
Country	Certification	Date	Sales certified	Physical sales
Belgium (Wallonia)	Gold	9 April 2005	25,000	
France	Diamond	16 June 2005	750,000	556,201+
