= Mon amour (Slimane song) =

2023 song by Slimane

Single by Slimane

from the album Essentiels
- Released: 8 November 2023
- Genre: Pop
- Length: 3:01
- Label: Noé
- Songwriters: Slimane Nebchi; Yaacov Salah; Meïr Salah
- Producers: Yaacov Salah; Meïr Salah

Slimane singles chronology
| "Je t'offirai le monde" (2023) | "Mon amour" (2023) | "Résister (What About Peace?)" (2024) |

Music video
- "Mon amour" on YouTube

Eurovision Song Contest 2024 entry
- Country: France
- Artist: Slimane
- Language: French
- Composers: Slimane Nebchi; Yaacov Salah; Meïr Salah
- Lyricist: Slimane Nebchi

Finals performance
- Final result: 4th
- Final points: 445

Entry chronology
- ◄ "Évidemment" (2023)
- "Maman" (2025) ►

Official performance video
- "Mon amour" (Second Semi-Final) on YouTube "Mon amour" (Grand Final) on YouTube

"Mon amour" (French pronunciation: [mɔ̃n‿amuʁ]; transl. "My love") is a song by French singer Slimane, released on 8 November 2023 by Noé Music. It was later released on Essentiels, a best-of album. Described as an "ode to romance and love", it was written and composed by Slimane, Yaacov Salah, and Meïr Salah. The song represented France in the Eurovision Song Contest 2024, where it finished in 4th place with 445 points at the grand final.

"Mon amour" drew mixed reception. Various reporters considered the song to be over-stereotypically French; however, praise was also given for the song's message along with Slimane's vocal abilities. "Mon amour" was a commercial success, peaking at number one in Luxembourg and Greece and within the top five in France, Belgium and Switzerland. It was additionally certified diamond by Syndicat National de l'Édition Phonographique.

== Background and composition ==
"Mon amour" has music and lyrics by Slimane, Yaacov Salah, and Meïr Salah. The song was written in around 2022 during a music tour, with the song inspired by Slimane's experiences in the Swiss city of Geneva. According to Slimane, the song to him is a "love letter to European hearts", in line with much of Slimane's music, which is mainly based on love. Slimane entered the Eurovision Song Contest as a way of means to share his work, his music, and to represent France. The song was later included on Slimane's first best-of album, Essentiels (2024).

The song itself has been described as an "ode to romance and love... with a poetic yet strong melody" by ESCUnited writer Arnaud Abadie. In a Wiwibloggs analysis by Ruxandra Tudor, they stated that the song analyzed the "themes of love", with love bringing both joy and the unknown at times. Despite the latter, an "unwavering devotion" to his loved ones is still shown by Slimane. Within the song, he also makes a call for reconciliation with a disoriented lover in Paris.

Slimane was officially announced as France's Eurovision representative for 2024 on France Inter on 8 November 2023. The song officially premiered on France 2 television show Journal de 20 heures later that day, with Slimane performing a live version.

== Promotion ==
To promote the song, Slimane announced his intents to perform it on numerous occasions before the contest, occasionally performing the song in different languages. He first gave a live performance of "'Mon amour" during a France Télévisions New Year's Eve special programme on 31 December 2023. He later performed the song on various international television programmes, including a 22 February 2024 performance at the first semi-final of Dora 2024, a 22 March performance on Italian television show La volta buona, and a 9 April performance on The Voice Belgique. He also participated in various Eurovision pre-parties throughout the months of March and April 2024, including Pre-Party ES on 30 March, the Barcelona Eurovision Party on 6 April, the London Eurovision Party on 7 April, Eurovision in Concert on 13 April, the Nordic Eurovision Party on 14 April, and the Copenhagen Eurovision Party on 4 May. Slimane also released a remixed version of the song on 16 April.

== Critical reception ==
Reception to "'Mon amour" has been mixed. In a Wiwibloggs review containing several reviews from several critics, the song was rated 7.17 out of 10 points, ranking 13th out of the 37 songs competing in the Eurovision Song Contest 2024 on the site's annual ranking. Vulture's Jon O'Brien ranked the song 26th overall, describing it as a "chanson so quintessentially French it might as well be performed by a beret-wearing bicyclist holding a baguette". ESC Beat's Doron Lahav ranked the song 33rd overall, writing that he thought that the song was "too predictable... It is a decent ballad that does not bring anything new to the table." Erin Adam of The Scotsman rated the song 8 out of 10 points, proclaiming the song to be "a sleeping giant". National Public Radio's (NPR) Glen Weldon included it in his list of 10 overall favourites to win the contest, deeming the song to be a "straight-down-the-middle ballad with a searching, plaintive, torch-song quality that's more quintessentially French than a beret slathered with Camembert and stuffed in a baguette".

== Eurovision Song Contest ==
=== Internal selection ===
France's broadcaster France Télévisions officially announced their participation in the Eurovision Song Contest 2024 on 7 June 2023, with France Télévisions officially announcing on 8 November 2023 that they had chosen to choose their artist internally in favor of a national final. On that same day, Slimane was officially announced as the country's representative for that year.

=== At Eurovision ===
The Eurovision Song Contest 2024 took place at the Malmö Arena in Malmö, Sweden, and consisted of two semi-finals held on the respective dates of 7 and 9 May and the final on 11 May 2024. As France was a member of the "Big Five", Slimane automatically qualified for the grand final. He was later drawn to perform in the second half of the grand final.

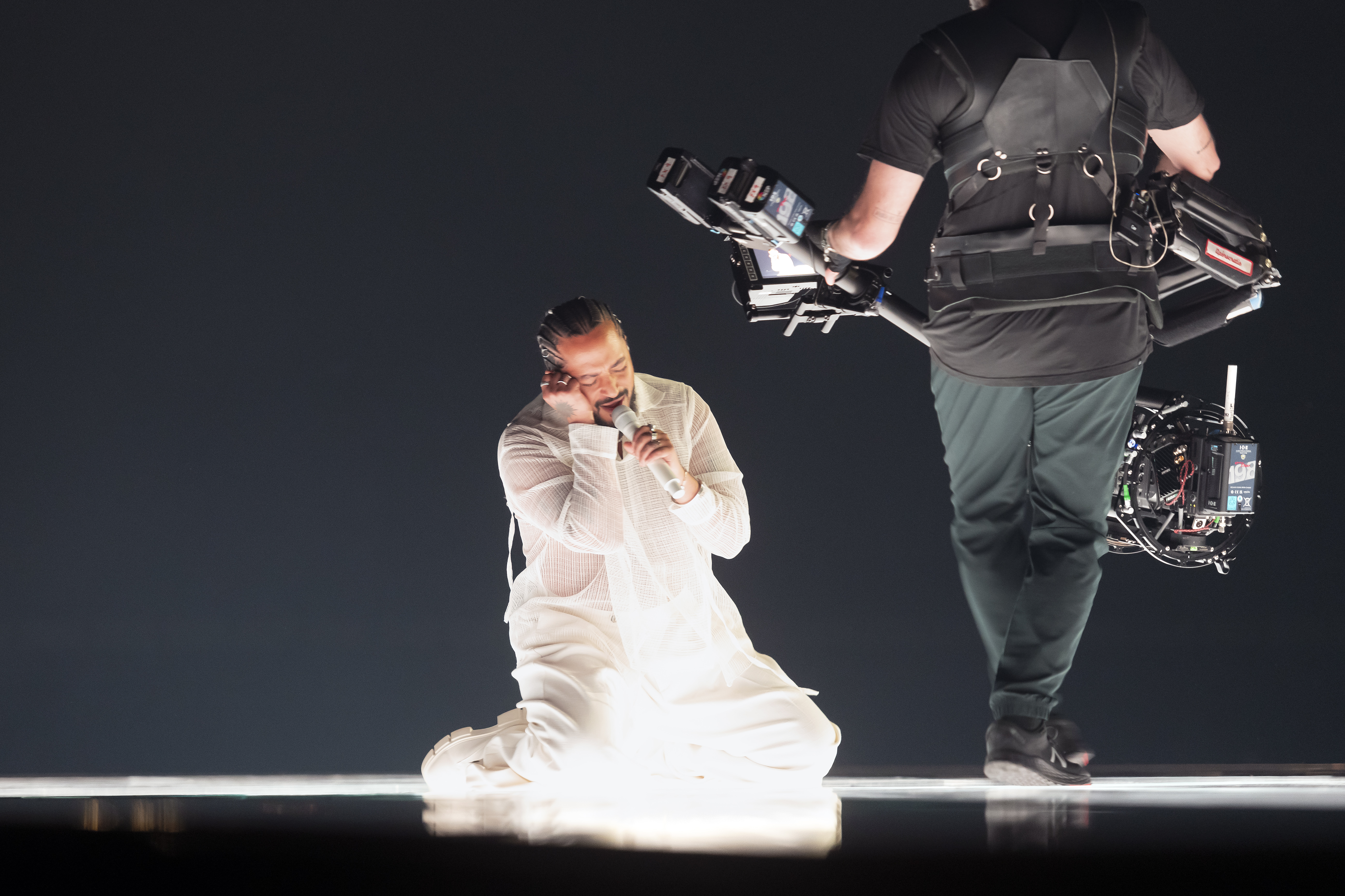
Slimane performing "Mon amour" at a dress rehearsal before the Eurovision 2024 grand final.

For its Eurovision performance, the song was altered so that Slimane could sing a verse a cappella; a suggestion that was made by collaborator Zach Reece. The performance featured a lone Slimane in a white outfit in a dark setting, with white smoke also being used. He starts the performance on his knees before standing for the second half. In the song's final verse, he sings the verse a cappella from a far distance from the microphone. The song was performed in 25th, ahead of Georgia's Nutsa Buzaladze and before Austria's Kaleen. During a dress rehearsal before the grand final, Slimane stopped his performance during the song's last verse, declaring a message of peace and unity; a message that was interpreted by NME as an alleged response to Israel's participation in the contest along with the disqualification of Dutch contestant Joost Klein.

After the results were announced, he finished in fourth with 445 points, with a split score of 218 points from juries and 227 points from public televoting. Regarding the former, the song received the sets of the maximum 12 points from four countries. In public televoting, one set of 12 points was awarded by Armenia. In response to his result, Slimane stated feelings of happiness, proclaiming, "I am very moved because I sang in my language... yes I'm not first, I'm fourth but I sang in French with a ballad that spoke of love while having kept my way everything I had in it".

== Track listing ==
Digital download/streaming

1. "Mon amour" – 3:00

Digital download/streaming – Meya Rework

1. "Mon amour" (Meya Rework) – 2:53

== Charts ==
Chart performance for "Mon amour"
| Chart (2023–2024) | Peak position |
|---|---|
| Austria (Ö3 Austria Top 40) | 45 |
| Belgium (Ultratop 50 Flanders) | 42 |
| Belgium (Ultratop 50 Wallonia) | 5 |
| Croatia (Billboard) | 6 |
| Finland (Suomen virallinen lista) | 47 |
| France (SNEP) | 2 |
| Global 200 (Billboard) | 144 |
| Greece International (IFPI) | 1 |
| Ireland (IRMA) | 76 |
| Israel (Mako Hitlist) | 48 |
| Latvia Streaming (LaIPA) | 9 |
| Lithuania (AGATA) | 8 |
| Luxembourg (Billboard) | 1 |
| Netherlands (Single Top 100) | 53 |
| Netherlands Tip (Dutch Top 40) | 23 |
| Norway (VG-lista) | 37 |
| Poland (Polish Streaming Top 100) | 75 |
| Portugal (AFP) | 62 |
| Spain (PROMUSICAE) | 97 |
| Sweden (Sverigetopplistan) | 24 |
| Switzerland (Schweizer Hitparade) | 3 |
| UK Singles Downloads (Official Charts) | 27 |
| UK Singles Sales (OCC) | 27 |

== Certifications ==
Certifications for "Mon amour"
| Region | Certification | Certified units/sales |
|---|---|---|
| Belgium (BRMA) | 2× Platinum | 80,000^{‡} |
| France (SNEP) | Diamond | 333,333^{‡} |
Streaming
| Greece (IFPI Greece) | Platinum | 2,000,000^{†} |
^{‡} Sales+streaming figures based on certification alone.^{†} Streaming-only figures based on certification alone.

== Release history ==
Release history and formats for "Mon amour"
| Country | Date | Format(s) | Version | Label | Ref. |
|---|---|---|---|---|---|
| Various | 8 November 2023 | Digital download; streaming | Single | Noé Music | |
| Various | 11 April 2024 | Digital download; streaming | Meya Rework | Noé Music | |
