= Damien Escobar =

American violinist, entrepreneur, and creative executive

- Also known as: Dame Esco
- Born: 1986 (age 39–40); Jamaica, Queens, New York City
- Genres: Classical; jazz; pop; R&B; hip hop
- Occupations: Violinist; Entrepreneur; Creative executive
- Instrument: Violin
- Years active: 2003–present
- Label: LCM Entertainment
- Member of: Art of Sound
- Formerly of: Nuttin' But Stringz
- Website: www.dameesco.com

Damien Escobar (born 1986), also known as Dame Esco, is an American violinist, entrepreneur, and creative executive. He first gained prominence as a member of the musical duo Nuttin' But Stringz alongside his brother Tourie, and has operated as a solo artist since 2012.

Recognized for redefining the role of the violin in contemporary culture, his musical style consists of a crossover blend of classical, jazz, pop, R&B, gospel, and hip hop. Following his performance career, Escobar transitioned into corporate branding and marketing, specializing in sonic branding and entertainment-led media.

== Early life and education ==
Escobar was born in 1986 in the Jamaica, Queens neighborhood of New York City, where he was raised by a single mother alongside his older brother, Tourie. He began playing the violin at the age of eight, quickly emerging as a child prodigy. At age ten, he became one of the youngest students ever accepted into the Juilliard School, graduating at thirteen. He also studied at the Bloomingdale School of Music. During their youth, Escobar and his brother performed extensively as street musicians in the New York City subway system and at Grand Central Terminal, developing an improvisational style that would later characterize his professional work.

== Career ==
=== Nuttin' But Stringz (2003–2012) ===
In 2003, the brothers began performing professionally under the name Nuttin' But Stringz. The duo won a talent contest at the Apollo Theater in 2005, and Escobar appeared in the film Step Up the following year. The group gained wider mainstream recognition after finishing in third place on the 2008 season of America's Got Talent.

Nuttin' But Stringz performed at the First inauguration of Barack Obama in 2009 and won two Emmy Awards. The duo became one of the period's most commercially successful crossover string acts, selling millions of records worldwide. Following the separation of the duo in 2012, Escobar experienced a period of personal and financial instability, including a period of homelessness, and briefly left the music industry to work as a real estate broker.

=== Solo career (2012–present) ===
Escobar returned to music as a solo act with a performance on the French television show Taratata. He went on to perform at the Indy Car 2012 Championship Awards Banquet, the Hip Hop Inaugural Ball, and the 2013 Food & Wine festival in New York City. In 2013, he launched the "I Am Me" comeback tour, followed by the release of his debut solo album, Sensual Melodies, in 2014.

The same year, he published a children's book, The Sound of Strings, and performed on Oprah Winfrey's "The Life You Want" weekend tour. His 2015 pop single, "Freedom", debuted at number 15 on the iTunes chart.

His second solo album, Boundless (2017), received a nomination for Outstanding Jazz Album at the 49th NAACP Image Awards. Following a brief hiatus, he released Songs from a Breakthrough and the holiday album 25 Days of Christmas in 2020. In 2022, Escobar went on his national "Life Out Loud" tour. In June 2024, he released the studio album Gemini under SRG Jazz, which featured the single "Taboo." In 2026, he embarked on "The Art of a Gentleman" concert tour.

=== Corporate creative roles ===
Alongside his musical career, Escobar transitioned into corporate branding and marketing roles, applying live-performance principles of human connection and emotional storytelling to brand communications. In 2024, communication and advertising network Havas appointed Escobar as its first global chief music officer. In this role, he worked across international markets and brand categories to develop sonic branding strategies geared toward modern audio-first platforms.

Within this ecosystem, he served as CEO of Art of Sound (AOS), an internal sonic marketing capability and culture-first creative consultancy fully integrated within the Havas network. Under his leadership, the agency grew to implement creative and sonic initiatives across beauty, sports, hospitality, healthcare, and technology sectors. Escobar also founded VOLYUM, a music and entertainment brand artist partnership platform launched in collaboration with Virgin Music Group. Developed within Havas, VOLYUM was designed to pair artists and creators directly with corporate brands to co-create branded entertainment and social-first media infrastructure outside traditional campaign structures.

== Artistic style and philosophy ==
Escobar's solo work incorporates cinematic arrangements, modern R&B production, and gospel influences. His artistic approach positions instrumental music as a medium for emotional healing, transformation, and vulnerability, leaning heavily on themes of resilience, peace, and love derived from his personal challenges. As both a performer and corporate executive, he advocates for the use of sonic storytelling as a strategic emotional language capable of guiding audience engagement and behavior.

== Discography ==
Year	Album	Songs
2013	Sensual Melodies	Cupid, Emotional Interlude, Adorn, Diced Pineapples, Unthinkable, Water Runs Dry
2017	Boundless	Love Notes, Fuse, Awaken, Get up and Dance, Phoenix, A Winter Night in Boston, Night Drive, Reflections, Mood Swings, Overture’15, Lights, Intermezzo
2020	Songs from a Breakthrough	Am I Wrong, Purple Rain, Rain
2020	25 Days of Christmas	This Christmas, Have Yourself a Merry Little Christmas
2024	Gemini	Zodiac, Taboo, Ascension, Mercury Rising, Déja Vu, Secret Garden (Gemini Remix), Symphony of Romance, Prelude
–	Others	Freedom, Best Mistake, Bermuda Triangle, All of Me, Thunder, Down, Broken Sorrow

== Awards and recognition ==
- 2009 : Won two Emmy Awards following high-profile broadcast performances, including a featured set at the First Inauguration of Barack Obama.
- 2017 : His second solo studio album, Boundless, debuted at No. 1 on both the Billboard Classical Albums and Classical Crossover Albums charts.
- 2018 : Nominated for Outstanding Jazz Album at the 49th NAACP Image Awards for his solo project, Boundless.

== Philanthropy ==
In 2007, Escobar established the Violins Against Violence foundation, a youth mentorship and music education initiative. He has also collaborated on charitable projects with UNICEF, the VH1 Save the Music Foundation, and the Jamaica YMCA board of directors in Queens. In November 2014, he released a musical rendition of "We Shall Overcome" dedicated to the memories of Mike Brown, Trayvon Martin and his friend Sean Bell.
