= Trait pour trait =

Studio album by Sniper
- Released: May 22, 2006
- Genre: French hip hop
- Length: 77:41

Sniper chronology
Gravé dans la roche (2003)	Trait pour trait (2006)

Trait pour trait is a 2006 album by the French hip hop group Sniper. It topped the charts in France two weeks after its release. It was published by a subsidiary of Warner Music.

== Track listing ==
1. "S.N.I." - (4:23)
2. "Dans mon monde" - (4:23)
3. "Trait pour trait" - (4:30)
4. "Eldorado" (featuring Faada Freddy of Daara J) - (6:35)
5. "Zamalia" - (4:16)
6. "Génération Tanguy" - (4:41)
7. "Donne Tout" - (4:31)
8. "La France (Itinéraire D'Une Polémique)" - (6:31)
9. "Hommes De Loi" - (5:41)
10. "Il Etait Une Fois" - (5:38)
11. "Radio" (1:15)
12. "Retour aux Sources" - (5:25)
13. "Elle" - (5:35)
14. "Brûle" - (4:41)
15. "Fallait Que Je Te Dise" - (9:36)
