= Struggle from the Subway to the Charts =

2006 album by Nuttin' But Stringz

Studio album by Nuttin' But Stringz
- Released: October 3, 2006 (US)
- Genre: Classical/Hip-Hop/R&B/Jazz
- Length: 47:17
- Label: NBS Entertainment / Koch Records
- Producer: Curtis Haskins

Struggle from the Subway to the Charts is the only studio album from American hip hop duo Nuttin' But Stringz.

== Track listing ==
1. "Broken Sorrow" – 4:45
2. "Struggle" – 4:04
3. "Thunder" – 3:44
4. "Beauty from Afar Intro" – 0:51
5. "Beauty from Afar" – 4:05
6. "Suka 4 Her (Interlude)" – 0:41
7. "Suka 4 Her" – 5:46
8. "Get Low" – 3:28
9. "Egyptian in the Night Intro" – 1:27
10. "Egyptian in the Night" – 4:37
11. "A Nu Day" – 4:15
12. "Dance with My Father" (bonus track) – 4:04
13. "Thunder (Remix)" (bonus track) – 1:25
