= Façon Sex =

Single by Tribal King

from the album Welcome
- B-side: "Remix"
- Released: August 2006
- Genre: R&B
- Length: 3:32
- Label: Universal
- Songwriters: Jean-Michel Padilla; David Ployer; Anthony Sansault
- Producer: Hit Sound Production

Tribal King singles chronology
"Façon Sex" (2006)	"Hey Girl" (2006)

"Façon Sex" is a 2006 song recorded by the French duet Tribal King. This R&B and dancehall song was released in August, 2006, as the first single from their debut album, Welcome. Charted in francophone countries, "Façon Sex" achieved a great success, particularly in France and Belgium where it topped the singles chart, thus being a summer hit.

== Background and chart performance ==
The song was written and the music composed by Jean-Michel Padilla, David Ployer and Anthony Sansault, and was produced by Hit Sound Production. It was compared to the songs by Tragédie (a French R&B group), particularly for its catchy refrain, its choreography and its explicit words alluding to sex. The song was also criticized for being too commercial, with poor lyrics. The song features on many French compilations, such as Hits 2 en 1 été 2006, Contact Play & Dance Vol. 3 (original club mix), Starfloor Vol. 5, NRJ Hits 2007 and Hit Connection - Best Of 2006.

In France, the single entered at number two on 5 August 2006 and reached number one two weeks later, staying there for five consecutive weeks, then dropped and totaled 15 weeks in the top ten and 25 weeks on the chart. It was the fourth best-selling single of the year. As of August 2014, it is the 73rd best-selling single of the 21st century in France, with 346,000 units sold.

In Belgium (Wallonia), the single debuted at number 37 on 30 September 2006, and peaked at number one for a single week on 18 November 2006. It remained for 11 weeks in the top ten and 19 weeks on the chart (Top 40). The single ranked number 30 on the Belgian year-end chart.

In Switzerland, the single charted for 19 weeks, from 20 August to 24 December 2006, and peaked at number 23 in its ninth week.

The band did not manage to duplicate the same performance with its second single, "Hey Girl".

== Track listings ==
CD maxi

1. "Façon sex" (radio edit) — 3:32
2. "Façon sex" (radio ragga mix) — 4:02
3. "Façon sex" (original club mix) — 5:47
4. "Façon sex" (teck house mix) — 5:49
5. "Façon sex" (house salsa mix) — 6:02

Digital download

1. "Façon sex" (radio edit) — 3:32

7" single - Picture disc

1. "Façon sex" (radio edit) — 3:32
2. "Façon sex" (radio ragga mix) — 4:02
3. "Façon sex" (original club mix) — 5:47
4. "Façon sex" (teck house mix) — 5:49
5. "Façon sex" (house salsa mix) — 6:02

== Charts and certifications ==
=== Weekly charts ===
Chart (2006)	Peak position
Belgian (Wallonia) Singles Chart	1
Eurochart Hot 100	6
French Digital Chart	2
French SNEP Singles Chart	1
Swiss Singles Chart	23

=== Year-end charts ===
Chart (2006)	Position
Belgian (Wallonia) Singles Chart	30
French Airplay Chart	49
French Singles Chart	4
French TV Airplay Chart	35

=== Certifications ===
Country	Certification	Date	Sales certified
France	Platinum	February 15, 2007	300,000
