= Vitaa =

French singer and songwriter (born 1983)

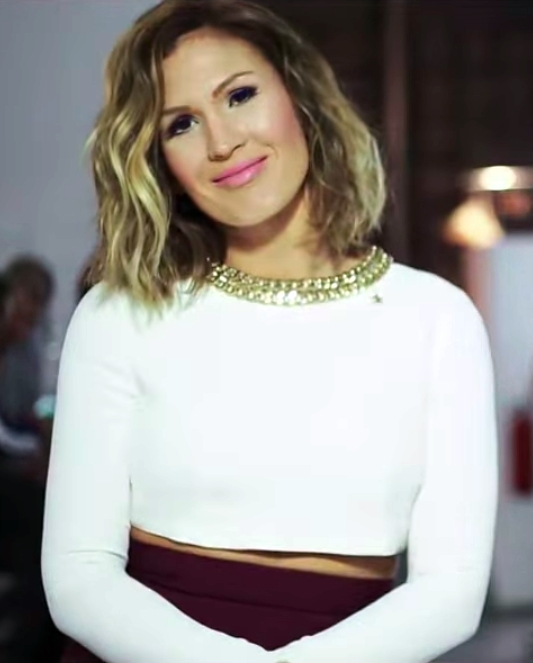

Background information
- Born: Charlotte Gonin; 14 March 1983 (age 43); Mulhouse, Alsace, France
- Genres: Pop; R&B
- Occupations: Singer; songwriter; composer
- Instrument: Piano
- Years active: 2002–present
- Labels: Motown, Universal
- Formerly of: Vitaa et Slimane
- Website: vitaa.fr

Charlotte Gonin (French pronunciation: [ʃaʁlɔt ɡɔnɛ̃]; born 14 March 1983), known by her stage name Vitaa (IPA: [vita]), is a French singer-songwriter.

== Early life ==
Charlotte Gonin was born on March 14, 1983, in Mulhouse and grew up in Lucenay. Her father is French and her mother, Geneviève, is French-Italian. She started singing from the age of 11, inspired by the French music of Jacques Brel and Francis Cabrel along with the soul musician Marvin Gaye. At 15 years old she set up her first small concerts until leaving home at the age of 17. She reignited her interest in songwriting, after finishing her bachelor's degree and receiving BTS in international commerce. For a few years she worked in a clothing store at a mall in La Part-Dieu in Lyon. She then left to live in Paris.

She took inspiration for her stage name from her mother and the first name of her great-grandmother, Gonin (female name derived from Vito, Guy, which means "life" in Italian). She co-created her first studio material with Akos.

== Career ==
Gonin had recorded several drafts when in 2000 Dadoo, convinced her to sing the song Oublie and the chorus of Pas à pas, which hit the radio and contributed to her recognition under the name Vitaa. In the following years, Vitaa worked small jobs to afford rent while trying to sign with a label.

She recorded a second duo on Dadoo's album, Sur ta route, before agreeing to duos with multiple artists (Mytho with Mafia K'1 Fry, Bol d'air with Rohff et Jasmin Lopez, Peur d'aimer avec Nessbeal, et Ne dis jamais avec Sinik). But she only gained major recognition from Diam's with the song Confessions nocturnes. Since then, Vitaa has appeared on the track "Peur d'aimer" ('Fear of Loving') with Nessbeal and "Ne dis jamais" ('Never Say') with Sinik.

The first artist signed to the Motown France label, Vitaa released her debut solo album A fleur de toi on 5 February 2007, which peaked at number one in France. The music video for the album's title track was filmed in Montreal, Quebec, Canada.

Gonin was the opening act for Rihanna's Last Girl on Earth show in Paris. In 2023 she released her second solo album, Charlotte, titledafter her birth name Charlotte Gonin. The album delves into her life as a mom and journey of self-discovery. The song "Ton amoureuse" paints a portrait of her and her child. The album was released on 6 October with the video of "Je n'oublié pas" on 26 October, the song which she performed at the 25th NRJ music awards 25th, where she also won the Francophone female artist of the year.

Gonin provided French dub for Poppy in both Trolls World Tour and Trolls Band Together.

== Discography ==
=== Albums ===
Year	Album	Peak positions					Units	Certifications
Year	Album	FRA	BEL (Fl)	BEL (Wa)	GER	SWI	Units	Certifications
2007	À fleur de toi	1	–	6	–	16		SNEP: 3× Platinum; BEA: Gold
2010	Celle que je vois	10	–	53	–	–		
2013	Ici et maintenant	16	–	44	–	–		
2015	La même	27	–	28	–	–		
2017	J4M	8	156	14	–	–		SNEP: 2× Platinum
2018	Just Me Myself & moi-même	29	–	–	–	–		SNEP: Platinum
2019	VersuS (with Slimane)	1	78	1	99	4	FRA: 1,000,000	SNEP: 2× Diamond; BEA: Platinum
2021	Sorøre (with Amel Bent and Camélia Jordana)	13	–	13	–	46		
2023	Charlotte	1	–	5	–	28		SNEP: Gold

=== Singles ===
Charting singles

Year	Single	Peak positions				Certifications	Album
Year	Single	FRA	BEL (Fl) Ultratip*	BEL (Wa) Ultratop	SWI	Certifications	Album
2006	"À fleur de toi"	14	–	6* (Ultratip)	76	SNEP: Diamond	
2013	"Game Over" (feat. Maître Gims)	1	68*	7	–		
2013	"Liham"	71	–	–	–		
2013	"Un son pour des millions"	68	–	–	–		
2013	"Juste un peu de temps"	72	–	–	–		
2015	"Vivre"	11	–	–	–		
2015	"No Limit"	28	–	–	–		
2016	"Ça les dérange" (feat. Jul)	11	–	–	–	SNEP: Diamond	
2016	"Bienvenue à Paris"	16	–	–	–		
2016	"Dans ma tête"	15	–	–	–		
2017	"Peine & pitié"	54	29*	19	–	SNEP: Gold	
2017	"Comme dab"	39	–	–	–	SNEP: Gold	
2017	"Un peu de rêve" (feat. Claudio Capéo)	13	–	–	–	SNEP: Diamond	
2018	"Je te le donne" (with Slimane)	12	–	3	–	SNEP: Diamond	VersuS
2019	"VersuS" (with Slimane)	159	–	35	–	SNEP: Gold	VersuS
2019	"Ça va ça vient" (with Slimane)	42	–	4	–	SNEP: Diamond	VersuS
2019	"Avant toi" (with Slimane)	11	12*	2	56	SNEP: Diamond; BEA: Gold	VersuS
2019	"Pas beaux" (with Slimane)	112	–	–	–	SNEP: Gold	VersuS
2019	"Ça ira" (with Slimane)	178	–	–	–	SNEP: Gold	VersuS
2020	"De l'or" (with Slimane)	109	–	8	–	SNEP: Gold	
2021	"Ma sœur" (with Amel Bent and Camélia Jordana)	159	–	–	–	SNEP: Gold	Sorøre
2021	"XY" (with Slimane)	–	–	47	–	SNEP: Gold	
2021	"Prends ma main" (with Gims)	49	–	39	–	SNEP: Platinum	
2023	"Je n'oublie pas"	174	–	23	–		
2025	"Viens on essaie" (with Julien Doré)	–	–	10	–		

*Did not appear in the official Belgian Ultratop 50 charts, but rather in the bubbling under Ultratip charts.

Other singles

- 2007: "Ma soeur"
- 2007: "Toi"
- 2007: "Pourquoi les hommes?"
- 2008: "Mon paradis secret"
- 2009: "Une fille pas comme les autres"
- 2010: "Pour que tu restes"

Featured in

Year	Single	Peak positions			Certifications
Year	Single	FRA	BEL (Wa) Ultratop	SWI	Certifications
2002	"Pas à pas (La plus bonne de tes copines)" (Dadoo feat. Vitaa)	46	–	–	
2006	"Confessions nocturnes" (Diam's with Vitaa)	–	8* (Ultratip)	–	
2006	"Ne dis jamais" (Sinik feat. Vitaa)	–	38* (Ultratip)	–	
2018	"Bella ciao" (Naestro feat. Maître Gims, Vitaa, Dadju & Slimane)	1	13	41	SNEP: Diamond

*Did not appear in the official Belgian Ultratop 50 charts, but rather in the bubbling under Ultratip charts.

=== Collaborations ===
- "Pas à Pas" with Dadoo
- "Mytho" with Mafia K'1 Fry
- "Bol d'air" with Rohff
- "Oublie" with Pit Baccardi and Diam's
- "Sur ta route" with Dadoo
- "Fille facile" with Dadoo
- "C.B" with Casus Belli
- "Confessions nocturnes" with Diam's; (It was parodied by Fatal Bazooka featuring Vitoo as "Mauvaise foi nocturne" (Pascal Obispo is Vitoo))
- "Ne dis jamais" with Sinik
- "La gomme" with Diam's
- "Peur d'aimer" with Nessbeal
- "Ma sœur" remix with Mac Tyer
- "Ma sœur" remix with Diam's
- "Tu Peux Choisir" with Gage
