= Pigloo =

Band that plays children's music

Pigloo is a baby penguin and the main character of a musical dance project. The project's first and most successful single came in 2006: "Papa Pingouin," a cover of a song performed in the Eurovision Song Contest in 1980. Pigloo is most popular in France.

== Biography ==
An animated music video for "Papa Pingouin" was produced, featuring a penguin dad and his son. This song was very successful in France, where it topped the singles chart for three weeks and eventually remained on the chart for 27 weeks. In February 2007, the German version of "Papa Pinguoin" climbed to 6th place in the German hit parade, partly due to the huge success of the video clip broadcast on RTL. The French version was sung by Heidi, while the German version was sung by Sara and Kerstin.

In June 2006, Pigloo released a second single, "Le ragga des pingouins", then "Ça plane pour moi (Le twist)" in September 2006, "Moi, j'aime skier!" (based on the melody of "Y.M.C.A.") in December 2006, and "Bizoo d'eskimo" in July 2007. All these singles were top 20 hits in France. His first album, La Banquise, was released in July 2006.

== Discography ==
=== Albums ===
Year	Title	Chart						Certification (FR)
Year	Title	FR	BEL (WA)	SWI	GER	POR	AUS	Certification (FR)
2006	La Banquise	14	36	66	—	6	20	—
2007	Le Noël de Pigloo	148	—	—	—	—	—	—
2008	Beijos de Esquimó	—	—	—	—	26	—	—

=== Singles ===
Year	Title	Chart						Certification (FR)
Year	Title	FR	BEL (WA)	SWI	GER	POR	AUS	Certification (FR)
2006	"Papa Pingouin" (Sophie & Magaly Cover)	1	6	24	6	—	4	Platinum
2006	"Le Ragga des pingouins"	4	10	71	—	—	4	—
2006	"Ça plane pour moi"	18	—	—	—	—	—	—
2006	"Moi, j'aime skier !"	10	13	—	—	—	—	—
2007	"Papa Pingouin" / "Ça plane pour moi"	—	—	—	—	43	—	—
2007	"Pinguin-rap"	—	—	36	34	—	18	—
2007	"Bizoo d'Eskimo"	14	—	—	—	—	—	—
