= Nuttin' But Stringz =

American violinist duo (2004–2012)

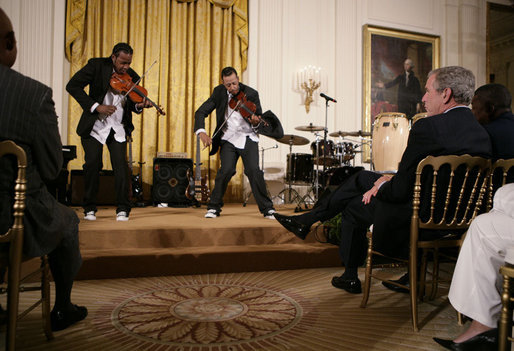
- President George W. Bush and guests watch violinists Tourie and Damien Escobar, as they perform Friday, June 22, 2007 in the East Room of the White House, in celebration of Black Music Month.

Background information
- Origin: New York, U.S.
- Genres: Alternative hip hop; R&B; progressive EDM
- Years active: 2004–2012
- Label: Sony Music

Nuttin' But Stringz, also known as N.B.S., consisted of the duo Tourie and Damien Escobar who both play violin. The musicians from Jamaica, Queens played a blend of classical music, hip-hop, jazz, and R&B.

== Biography ==
Nuttin But Stringz began studying violin at ages 8 and 7, respectively, and eventually studied at the Juilliard School.

In 2005, the duo entered and won a talent competition at the Apollo Theatre in New York. Their victory on Showtime at the Apollo led to media attention and appearances on The Ellen DeGeneres Show, The Today Show with Katie Couric, and The Tonight Show with Jay Leno. Around the same time the duo showcased their talents at Carnegie Hall and performed for President George W. Bush at The White House.

On January 8, 2006, Nuttin But Stringz performed their Hit song Thunder at the debut of the redesigned Cadillac CTS at the North American International Auto Show in Detroit. Nuttin' But Stringz performed after a classical string quartet. General Motors executives used the two performances as an analogy, to demonstrate that what used to be good enough (the quartet) needs to be reinvigorated (N.B.S). A video for "Thunder" is also featured on the website for Jack's Big Music Show on Noggin (now called Nick Jr.). The exposure continued when they were featured in the first of five commercials featuring local artists on New York's local news channel, NY1.

NBS gained national attention when their unique brand of music secured the Duo a part in the 2006 dance movie Step Up, and shortly after CBS featured "Thunder" during the 2007 NCAA Tournament. "Thunder" was also featured in the 1st episode of the television series The Black Donnellys, and was used in various television commercials.

In spring 2009, NBS announced via the group's website that a new album was in the works and was followed later in that year by a hugely successful tour.

Their music has sold platinum.

They debuted their song "Winner" on "The Debrief with David Ushery" on New York Nonstop on July 23, 2010.

=== Collaborations ===
Nuttin' But Stringz collaborated with various artists including: Al Jarreau, Hadi abbas, Akon, Aretha Franklin, Brian McKnight, Chaka Khan, Charlie Daniels, Charlie Wilson, Drake, Gladys Knight, Gucci Mane, Isley Brothers, Jay Sean, John Legend, Jonas Brothers, Justin Bieber, Mary J Blige, Mario, Maroon 5, Miley Cyrus, Patti LaBelle, Pretty Ricky, Rascal Flatts, Stevie Wonder, The Manhattans, The Temptations, Trey Songz (on MTV Unplugged) and Yolanda Adams

=== Print ===
Nuttin' But Stringz have been featured in Ebony, Jet, USA Today, Vibe, The Daily News, New York Post, New York Times, "AMPS Magazine" and the LA Times.

=== Corporate performances ===
Nuttin' But Stringz scored and appeared in a McDonald's commercial for the Launch of their fruit smoothies. They performed their song "Winner" for The Boeing Company at the introduction ceremony of their new airplane, the Boeing 747-8 Intercontinental. In 2011 they performed at an event for Johnnie Walker in Uruguay.

== America's Got Talent ==
=== Overview ===
Nuttin But Stringz big break came when they auditioned for the third season of NBC's America's Got Talent in New York City and received a unanimous yes from all three judges thus advancing to Las Vegas. They were subsequently named to the Top 40, advancing to Hollywood. They made it through subsequent rounds and were one of the five acts to make it to the finals. The duo ultimately placed third behind the winner Neal E. Boyd and runner-up Eli Mattson.

Nuttin But Stringz music was featured during a montage at the 2008 Summer Olympics in Beijing, China.

=== Performances/Results ===
| Week | Theme | Song choice | Original artist | Result |
|---|---|---|---|---|
| Audition | N/A | "Thunder" | Nuttin' But Stringz | Advanced |
| Vegas Verdicts | Instrumentals | "N/A" | N/A | Advanced |
| Top 40; Group 1 | N/A | "Broken Sorrow" | Nuttin' But Stringz | Advanced |
| Top 20; Group 1 | Heroes | "Thunder Remix" | Nuttin' But Stringz | Advanced |
| Top 10 | N/A | "Winner" | Nuttin' But Stringz | Advanced |
| Top 5 | N/A | "Thunder" | Nuttin' But Stringz | 3rd Place |

== Discography ==
=== Studio albums ===
| Year | Album details |
|---|---|
| 2006 | Struggle from the Subway to the Charts: Release date: October 3, 2006; Label: Koch Records |

=== Singles ===
| Year | Single | Album |
|---|---|---|
| 2006 | "Dance with My Father" | from the Subway to the Charts |
| 2006 | "Thunder" | from the Subway to the Charts |
| 2011 | "Winner" | |

== Filmography ==
- Step Up
