= Jeune Demoiselle =

Single by Diam's

from the album Dans ma bulle
- Released: June 6, 2006
- Recorded: 2006
- Genre: French hip hop
- Length: 4:11
- Songwriters: Diam's, Luke, Dr Swing, Yann Le Men
- Producers: Tefa, Masta

Music video
- "Jeune Demoiselle" on YouTube

"Jeune Demoiselle" is the second single from Diam's 2006 album Dans ma bulle.

== Track listings ==
CD-Single

1. "Jeune Demoiselle" (Version Radio) (4:11)
2. "Jeune Demoiselle" (Instrumental) (4:02)

CD-Maxi

1. "Jeune Demoiselle" (Version Radio) (4:11)
2. "Jeune Demoiselle" (Instrumental) (4:02)
3. "Jeune Demoiselle" (Video) (4:14)
4. "Jeune Demoiselle" (Making of)
5. Video (3:45)
6. Lyrics

== Charts ==
Chart	Peak position
Belgian (Wallonia) Singles Chart	3
French Singles Chart	4
Swiss Singles Chart	20

== Certifications ==
Region	Certification	Certified units/sales
France (SNEP)	Platinum	300,000^{*}
^{*} Sales figures based on certification alone.
