= Tribal King =

French music duo

- Origin: Mulhouse, France
- Genre: R&B
- Years active: 2005-present
- Members: David; Nony

See tribal king for the social rank.

Tribal King is a French duo composed of David (born April 2, 1979 in Mulhouse, France) and Nony (born June 19, 1984 in Müllheim, West Germany). Both are from Mulhouse, then Belfort. Their music is a mixture of pop / R&B and reggae dancehall.

== Biography ==
The group was established in August 2005 during a party in a club in Altkirch (Haut-Rhin).

The first single of the band was "Façon Sex", which was atop of the singles chart for five weeks during 2006 summer in France. The first album, entitled Welcome, was released on October 2, 2006.

The group participated in the show Star Academy, broadcast on TF1 on September 29, 2006.

Back in the 2008 summer, the band released the single "Hands Up", sponsored by Fun Radio. A new album, Level 2 is currently recorded.

== Discography ==
=== Albums ===
| Year | Title | Chart | | | Certification (FR) |
| Year | Title | FR | BEL (WA) | SWI | Certification (FR) |
|---|---|---|---|---|---|
| 2006 | Welcome | 18 | — | — | — |
| 2009 | Level 2 | — | — | — | — |

=== Singles ===
| Year | Title | Chart | | | Certification (FR) |
| Year | Title | FR | BEL (WA) | SWI | Certification (FR) |
|---|---|---|---|---|---|
| 2006 | "Façon Sex" | 1 | 1 | 23 | Platinum |
| 2006 | "Hey Girl" | 15 | 27 | — | — |
| 2008 | "Hands Up" | 32 | — | — | — |
| 2009 | "Gimme Love" | TBA | TBA | TBA | TBA |
