= Brut de femme =

Brut de Femme

Studio album by Diam's
- Released: May 23, 2003
- Genre: French hip hop
- Label: Hostile Records

Diam's chronology
Brut de Femme (2003)	Dans ma bulle (2006)

Singles from Brut de Femme
- 1. "DJ" Released: 10 June 2003; 2. "Incassables" Released: 12 January 2004; 3. "Evasion" Released: 22 March 2004

Brut de femme is the second album of Diam's, released in 2003. This album won the Victoires de la musique (Music's Victories) for the Album rap, hip-hop de l’année (Rap/hip-hop album of the year).

== Track listing ==
1. "Intro"
2. "Incassables"
3. "Mon Répertoire"
4. "Cruelle A Vie"
5. "Dj"(sample of ¿Quién será?)
6. "Madame Qui ?"
7. "1980"
8. "Où Je Vais"
9. "Vénus"
10. "Ma Souffrance"
11. "Èvasion"
12. "Amoré"
13. "Daddy"
14. "Parce Que"
15. "Suzy 2003"

== Charts ==
Chart	Peak position
French Albums Chart (SNEP)	7
Belgian Albums Chart (Wallonia)	45

== Certifications ==
Region	Certification	Certified units/sales
France (SNEP)	Gold	100,000^{*}
^{*} Sales figures based on certification alone.
