= Métal Hurlant Chronicles =

- TV poster
- Genre: Science fiction, action, thriller, adventure, fantasy
- Based on: Métal Hurlant by Jean-Pierre Dionnet
- Developed by: Guillaume Lubrano
- Written by: Justine Veillot; Guillaume Lubrano; Dan Wickline
- Directed by: Guillaume Lubrano
- Starring: Rutger Hauer; Kelly Brook; Scott Adkins; Michael Jai White; Joe Flanigan; James Marsters
- Narrated by: Benoît Allemane (French)
- Theme music composer: Jesper Kyd
- Countries of origin: Belgium; France
- Original languages: English; French
- No. of seasons: 2
- No. of episodes: 12

Production
- Producers: Justine Veillot; Guillaume Lubrano; Léon Pérahia; Sylvain Goldberg; Serge De Poucques
- Production location: Romania
- Cinematography: Matthieu Misiraca
- Editors: Sébastien Bacchini; Anima Rolland
- Camera setup: Single-camera
- Running time: 26 minutes
- Production companies: WE Productions; Sparkling; Aranéo; Nexus Factory; Dupuis Audiovisuel; France Télévisions; Fortis Film Fund; Nolife; Les Humanoïdes Associés

Original release
- Network: France 4
- Release: 27 October 2012 – 12 May 2014

Métal Hurlant Chronicles is an English-language Franco-Belgian science fiction anthology television series based on the popular comics anthology magazine Métal Hurlant, known in the United States as Heavy Metal. Each episode is a self-contained story taking place on a different planet with a different cast, and the episodes are linked together only by the idea that an asteroid, the "Métal Hurlant", passes the planet in question during the events of the story. The show's premise originated with Guillaume Lubrano, who put together a self-financed pilot to pitch the show, which was broadcast as the series' third episode. Lubrano and Justine Veillot produce the show through their company WE Productions. It was largely filmed in Bucharest, Romania.

The series premiered in French television on 27 October 2012 on France 4. Broadcast rights for various European countries such as Germany, Austria and Luxembourg, were bought by Sony Pictures Television.

== Plot ==
As an anthology series, each episode is a self-contained science-fiction story taking place in a different world, with different characters played by a different cast and adapted from a story previously published in the Métal Hurlant magazine. However, the show also proposes that all the stories are linked together by an asteroid, called the "Métal Hurlant", which is passing close to the planet where the episode's story is taking place.

The opening credits, narrated in French by voice actor Benoît Allemane, inform that the "Métal Hurlant" (Screaming Metal) is the last fragment of what was once a living planet, led to destruction by the madness of its inhabitants and condemned to travel ceaselessly through space and time, screaming its sadness and despair.

== Cast ==
A number of notable British, French, American and Dutch actors have performed in various episodes of the show, including Scott Adkins, Karl E. Landler, Michael Jai White, James Marsters, Michelle Ryan, David Belle, Dominique Pinon, Kelly Brook, Joe Flanigan, Frédérique Bel and Rutger Hauer among others.

== Broadcast ==
After being initially expected for early 2012, all six episodes of season one were broadcast on France 4 in a late night time slot over the course of two nights in either default dubbed French or optional subtitled original English audio tracks, between 27 October and 3 November of the same year. Nolife was expected to rebroadcast season one in France sometime in 2013.

Sony Pictures Television has bought the broadcast rights for several European countries, where it was at least aired on Animax in Germany, Austria and Switzerland.

Syfy Channel began airing the first season of the series in the U.S. on 14 April 2014 on Mondays at 8:00 and 8:30 p.m with various repeats during the week following.

== Reception ==
Broadcast on 27 October 2012 after 3 episodes of Doctor Who that gathered a 1.4% share on the night, Métal Hurlant succeeded in raising the global share for channel France 4, bringing it to a tie with W9 and beating out Gulli, NT1 & D8.

The premiere episode attracted 347,000 viewers, garnering a 2.2% share at 11 p.m, but lost about 100,000 viewers for the next two episodes broadcast on the same night. Overall the night held 2.4% of 15- to 34-year-olds and 3.5% of men aged 15 to 49.

When it debuted on SyFy in 2014, its viewership was slightly below normal for a pilot in its time slot, and then steadily declined. Its critical reception has been tepid, from the start. Generally, the series is described as having decent visual effects, but being poorly written and produced, with inconsistent acting.

== Series overview ==
Series	Episodes	Originally released	
Series	Episodes	First released	Last released
1	6	27 October 2012	3 November 2012
2	6	4 January 2014	12 May 2014

== Episodes ==
All 12 episodes were directed by Guillaume Lubrano.

=== Season 1 ===
No.	Title	Written by	Original release date	Prod. code	Viewers	Share
1	"King's Crown" "La Couronne du Roi"	Guillaume Lubrano & Justine Veillot	27 October 2012	—	347,000	2.2%
Starring: Scott Adkins, Michael Jai White, Darren Shahlavi & Matt Mullins; Based on: "King's Crown" by Jim Alexander & Richard Corben from Métal Hurlant №142, and (Vol.2) No. 10, and (hardcover) No. 2 Plot: Moderated by robots, a combat tournament takes place to determine the successor of a throne.
2	"Shelter Me" "Protège-Moi"	Guillaume Lubrano, Justine Veillot & Dan Wickline	27 October 2012	—	250,000	1.9%
Starring: James Marsters & Michelle Ryan; Based on: "Shelter Me" by Dan Wickline & Mark Vigouroux from Métal Hurlant №142, and (Vol.2) No. 9, and (hardcover) No. 1 Plot: A woman wakes up in a bomb shelter with another man. Is he telling the truth about the world's end or keeping her captive?
3	"Red Light / Cold Hard Facts" "Lumière Rouge / Réalité Glaçante"	Guillaume Lubrano & Justine Veillot	27 October 2012	101	250,000	2.2%
Starring: Guy Amram, David Belle, Jean-Yves Berteloot, Cyrille Diabaté, Patrice Delmont & Jean-Michel Martial; Based on: "Red Light" by Geoff Johns & Christian Gossett and "Cold Hard Facts" by R.A. Jones & Matt Cossin from Métal Hurlant №141, and (Vol.2) No. 2 ("Red Light"), and (Vol.2) No. 8 ("Cold Hard Facts"), and (hardcover) No. 1 (both); Plot: In the first story, a fortified prison is controlled by strange creatures and has one prisoner that will do anything to escape. In the second story, Earth in 2312 is filled with 37 billion people. Scientists discover one more person, frozen from the 20th century.
4	"Three on a Match" "Oxygène"	Guillaume Lubrano & Justine Veillot	3 November 2012	—	N/A	N/A
Starring: Craig Fairbrass, Dominique Pinon, Eriq Ebouaney, Nathan Rippy & Andy Chase; Based on: "3 on a Match" by R.A. Jones & Ryan Sook from Métal Hurlant №139, and (hardcover) No. 1 Plot: Three men survive a crash, but a leak in their hull forces a not-so-difficult decision.
5	"Master of Destiny" "Les Maîtres du Destin"	Guillaume Lubrano & Justine Veillot	3 November 2012	—	N/A	N/A
Starring: Joe Flanigan, Kelly Brook & Charlie Dupont; Based on: "Les Maîtres du Destin" by Alejandro Jodorowsky & Adi Granov from Métal Hurlant №143, and (Vol.2) No. 10 (as "Masters of Destiny"); Plot: A mercenary travels to the end of the galaxy in search of a secluded race.
6	"Pledge of Anya" "Le Serment d'Anya"	Guillaume Lubrano & Justine Veillot	3 November 2012	—	N/A	N/A
Starring: Rutger Hauer, Grégory Basso, Puiu Mitea, Ion Bechet & Gabriel Velicu; Based on: "Le Serment d’Anya" by Julien Blondel & Jérôme Opena from Métal Hurlant №146. Plot: A warrior is tasked to destroy a foe, who turns out to be a six-year-old boy.

=== Season 2 ===
No.	Title	Written by	Original release date	Prod. code	Viewers	Share
1	"Whiskey in the Jar" "Whisky"	Guillaume Lubrano & Justine Veillot	21 April 2014	—	N/A	N/A
Starring: Michael Biehn, James Marsters, Dan Cade & Florin Stancu; Based on: "Whisky in the Jar" by Jim Alexander & Gérald Parel from Metal Hurlant (Vol.2) No. 14, and (hardcover) No. 2 Plot: A small-town sheriff receives a visit from a doctor with a talent for saving lives. But there may be more to the "talent" than meets the eye.
2	"The Endomorphe" "L'Endomorphe"	—	19 April 2014	—	N/A	N/A
Starring: Michelle Lee, Silvio Simac, Michael Jai White & Darren Shahlavi; Based on: "Endomorphe" by Stéphane Levallois from Metal Hurlant (Vol.2) No. 14, and (hardcover) No. 1 Plot: In the conflict between humanity and the Mecamorphes, a key role is played by someone unexpected.
3	"Loyal Khondor" "Le Dernier Khondor"	Guillaume Lubrano	5 May 2014	—	N/A	N/A
Starring: Karl E. Landler, Marem Hassler, Scott Adkins, John Rhys-Davies, Marc Duret & Kamel Laadaili; Based on: "The Loyal Khondor" by Alejandro Jodorowsky, Pascal Alixe, and Dan Brown from Metal Hurlant (Vol.2) No. 4. Plot: A loyal warrior seeks an elixir to cure his princess, stricken by disease.
4	"Second Chance" "Seconde chance"	Guillaume Lubrano	28 April 2014	—	N/A	N/A
Starring: Scott Adkins & Karl E. Landler; Based on: "Second Chances" by James MacDonald, Jorge Pereira Lucas, and Dan Brown from Metal Hurlant (Vol.2) No. 5, and (hardcover) No. 1 Plot: A notorious gambler is chased by the galaxy's most notorious creditor.
5	"Second Son" "Le Second fils"	—	5 May 2014	—	N/A	N/A
Starring: Karl E. Landler, Frédérique Bel & Dominique Pinon; Based on: "The Second Son" by Brian Robertson & Fred Beltran from Metal Hurlant (Vol.2) No. 13, and (hardcover) No. 1 Plot: A fierce sibling rivalry between two princes transcends life and death.
6	"Back to Reality" "Retour à la réalité"	Guillaume Lubrano	12 May 2014	—	N/A	N/A
Starring: Jimmy Jean-Louis, Dominique Pinon, Lygie Duvivier, Guy Amram, Grégory Basso & Aurore Tomé; Based on: "Reality Check" by Jim MacDonald & Francis Tsai from Métal Hurlant (hardcover) No. 1 Plot: A dream fixer allows the wealthy to dream themselves into new realities and worlds. But is he ultimately manipulating his clients?

== Home media ==
Shout Factory released both seasons on 14 April 2015 on Blu-ray and DVD.
