= Diam's =

French-Cypriot musical artist (born 1980)

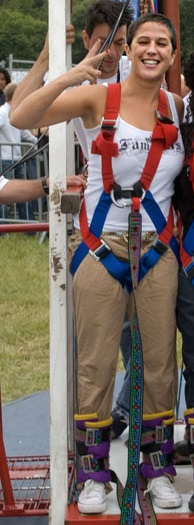

Background information
- Born: Mélanie Marie Georgiades; 25 July 1980 (age 46); Nicosia, Cyprus
- Genre: Hip hop
- Occupations: Rapper; songwriter; actress
- Instruments: Vocals; piano
- Years active: 1999–2012
- Label: Hostile Records
- Website: www.melanie-diams.com

Mélanie Georgiades (French pronunciation: [melani ʒɔʁʒjadɛs]), better known by her stage name Diam's (pronounced [djams]), is a retired French rapper of Greek-speaking Cypriot origin.

== Biography ==
Mélanie Marie Georgiades was born on 25 July 1980, in Nicosia, capital of Cyprus. Her mother is French and her father is Greek-speaking Cypriot. After her parents separated, she arrived in France with her mother at the age of three. She spent her childhood in Paris, then in the department of Essonne, in Brunoy, until the age of thirteen.

She studied for a while in Igny, in the private Saint-Nicolas college. Later, she moved to Massy then to Orsay in the suburban district of Mondetour, where she spent most of her adolescence. She discovered rap through the album The Chronic (1992) by Dr. Dre and the first song by the group NTM, Je rap (1990) (published on Rapattitude, the first French rap compilation). She chose Diam's as her pseudonym in 1995, a choice she explains as "I came across the definition of the word diamond and I learned that a diamond can only be broken by another diamond and that it is only made of natural elements".

=== Beginnings (1994–2002) ===
In 1995, at the age of fifteen, she attempted suicide. In 2003, she rapped about her past and how, aged 17, she was beaten by her partner in a song called Ma souffrance (My suffering).

She formed a group called Mafia Tres. In 1997, the group released a four title EP with Diam's on two tracks. Diam's became better known, thanks to her appearance in 1997 on Mafia Trece's first album, called Cosa Nostra, and thanks to an appearance on Phonograph with the rap group ATK.

After her separation from Mafia Tres, Diam's released her first album, Premier Mandat in 1999, but it was not a success, selling just 9,000 copies.

In 2001 the song Suzy broadcast on the compilation Original Bombattack on radio Générations 88.2. The song was picked up on the Internet. Suzy came to the attention of Jamel Debbouze who became her friend and mentor. She then made many appearances and participations on radio shows. She finally prepared her second album, entitled Brut de femme and the record company EMI offers her a contract in April 2002. The project was abandoned following a restructuring of EMI while the two titles Pogo and 1980 were broadcast by a journalist on the Internet before their official release.

=== Success (2003–2009) ===
She signed on the Hostile label after long negotiations. The tracks were reworked and finally integrated into her second album, Brut de femme. Brut de femme quickly went gold and the single DJ was certified platinum. Diam's won a Victoire de la Musique for the best rap album of the year 2004.

She took a stand against Marine Le Pen and her National Rally party (formerly the National Front), especially in the song "Marine", which was released on her DVD Ma Vie/Mon Live in 2004. She also stands against Nicolas Sarkozy, whom she called a demagogue and fascist in La Boulette and Ma France à moi.

In 2005, she cemented her importance as a songwriter with "Ma philosophie"—a huge number one hit for Pop Idol star Amel Bent.

In 2006 she returned with the album Dans ma bulle, debuting at number one on the French album chart selling 50,000 copies in its first week. Diam's first single from Dans Ma Bulle, La Boulette gained immense popularity and airtime. It stayed at number one on the French music charts for 6 consecutive weeks. Her second single Jeune Demoiselle debuted at No. 4. Ma France à moi and Confessions nocturnes with Vitaa also proved to popular. Dans Ma Bulle went on to be the biggest-selling French album in France in 2006.

Diam's won three awards at the NRJ Music Awards in 2007 (Francophone female artist of the year, Francophone album for Dans ma bulle and Francophone song for La boulette). Le Figaro newspaper estimated that Diam's achieved revenues of 2.66 million euros for her album.

After a year away from the media, Diam's returns in 2009 with her fourth and final album, SOS, which ranked first in album sales in France when it was released on 16 November 2009, achieving sales of more than 300,000 copies in France. The first single Enfants du désert from her new album, whose video takes a scene from the film Forrest Gump where the hero runs across the United States. The disc marks the metamorphosis of the artist.

=== Retirement (2012-Now) ===
In July 2012, she published her book Diam's Autobiographie. On 30 September 2012, she announced on the show Sept à huit on TF1 the end of her career as a rapper.

In 2022, she made the documentary on her career, "Salam", which the former rapper will be presenting at the Cannes Film Festival. In a rare message posted to Instagram, Diam's, who had previously retired from social media, explained her motivation, and why she agreed to entrust her story to directors Houda Benyamina (Divine) and Anne Cissé, after refusing dozens of requests for years:

"I had the feeling that I was being asked to give the keys to my life so that others could make a film of it. A show. My depression, my suffering, my quest, my recognition: a film? An entertainment? I was touched that people were interested in my career, but it was impossible for me to let strangers speak for me… So I took up the pen again. The one thing I have always loved delivered me."

== Personal life ==
In 2007, she suffered from depression due to personal problems, which she returned to in the song Si c'était le dernier. Diagnosed as bipolar, she alternated between stays in a psychiatric hospital and her career as an artist. When she left the hospital, she decided to stop taking the medication, and she attempted suicide by swallowing sleeping pills.

In December 2008, she converted to Islam, she said that religion liberated her and helped her through these difficult ordeals. In September 2009, she married her companion Aziz. On 8 October 2009, Paris Match magazine published pictures of her leaving a mosque in Gennevilliers with her husband, wearing an Islamic veil. In the midst of a debate on the banning of the full veil in public places, these stolen photos caused a scandal.

In 2010, Diam's won her complaint against Le Nouvel Observateur magazine for violating her image rights and privacy after publishing a picture of Diam's wearing a headscarf without permission. The picture was placed in an article about French Muslims.

In the spring of 2012, Mélanie gave birth to a daughter named Maryam. In 2015, she married again, and gave birth to a boy named Abraham.

In 2012, Diam's announced her retirement from the music industry. This decision stemmed from her religious convictions and her adoption of Salafism, a conservative interpretation of Islam. She stated that she believed pursuing a career in rap or hip-hop was incompatible with her faith. Diam's further indicated that she had stopped listening to music altogether, including her own previously recorded work.

== Discography ==
=== Albums ===
Year	Album	Peak chart positions			
Year	Album	FR	FR (DD)^{1}	BEL (WA)	SWI
1999	Premier mandat	-	-	-	-
2003	Brut de femme	7	-	45	-
2004	Ma vie / Mon live (Live album)	53	-	-	-
2006	Dans ma bulle	1	-	3	19
2009	S.O.S.	1	1	6	18

=== Singles ===
Year	Single	Peak chart positions			
Year	Single	FR	FR (DD)^{1}	BEL (WA)	SWI
2003	"DJ" (music video directed by J.G Biggs)	2	-	1	16
2003	"Incassables"	31	-	8	29
2004	"Évasion" (Diam's feat. China)	29	-	31	45
2006	"La boulette (Génération nan nan)"	1	2	1	12
2006	"Jeune Demoiselle"	4	3	3	20
2007	"Ma France à moi"	11	-	12	-
2009	"I am somebody"	-	-	-	-
2009	"Enfants du désert"	-	6	21	80
2010	"Coeur de bombe"	-	43	-	-
2010	"Peter Pan"	-	-	-	-
As featured artist
2003	"Un peu de respect" (Lady Laistee feat. Diam's)	90	-	-	-
2003	"Promise" (music video directed by J.G Biggs) (Kamnouze vs. Diam's feat. Jango Jack)	50	-	-	-
2004	"Relève la tête" (Kery James feat. Diam's, Passi, Matt & Kool Shen)	39	-	-	-
2006	"Les mains en l'air" (Admiral T feat. Diam's)	29	-	-	76
2006	"Non c'sera non (omri omri)" (Cheb Mami feat. Diam's & Leslie)	30	-	-	-

^{1} Digital Downloads

== Recognitions ==
Year	Award-giving Body	Award	Result
2004	Victoires de la Musique	Rap/hip-hop album of the year (Brut de Femme)	Won
2006	MTV Europe Music Awards 2006	Best French Act	Won
2007	NRJ Music Awards	Francophone Album of the Year (Dans Ma Bulle)	Won
2007	NRJ Music Awards	Francophone Female Artist of the Year	Won
2007	NRJ Music Awards	Francophone Song of the Year (La Boulette)	Won
2007	NRJ Music Awards	Music Video of the Year (Jeune Demoiselle)	Nominated
2007	L'Année Du Hip Hop	Best Song (La Boulette)	Won
2007	L'Année Du Hip Hop	Best Rap Artist	Won
2007	L'Année Du Hip Hop	Best Album (Dans Ma Bulle)	Won
2010	NRJ Music Awards	Francophone Album of the Year (S.O.S.)	Nominated
2010	NRJ Music Awards	Francophone Female Artist of the Year	Nominated
