= V V Brown discography =

- Studio albums: 4
- Singles: 9

V V Brown has released four studio albums to date.

== Studio albums ==
Title	Year	Peak chart positions			Certifications
Title	Year	UK	FRA	US	Certifications
Travelling Like the Light	Released: 13 July 2009; Labels: Island, Capitol	30	16	179	
Samson & Delilah	Released: 8 September 2013; Label: YOY Records	158	—	—	
Glitch	Released: 25 September 2015; Label: YOY Records	—	—	—	
Am I British Yet?	Released: 27 October 2023; Label: YOY Records	—	—	—	
"—" denotes an album that did not chart or was not released.

== Singles ==
=== As lead artist ===
Year	Title	Peak chart positions					Album
Year	Title	UK	FRA	SWI	US	US Dance	Album
2006	"Whipped"	—	—	—	—	—	Back to the Music
2009	"Crying Blood"	—	—	—	—	—	Travelling Like the Light
2009	"Leave!"	—	—	—	—	—	Travelling Like the Light
2009	"Shark in the Water"	34	13	54	67	26	Travelling Like the Light
2009	"Game Over"	—	—	—	—	—	Travelling Like the Light
2011	"Children" (featuring Chiddy Bang)	—	—	—	—	—	Lollipops & Politics (unreleased)
2013	"Samson"	—	—	—	—	—	Samson & Delilah
2013	"The Apple"	—	—	—	—	—	Samson & Delilah
2014	"Faith" (featuring Kele Okereke)	—	—	—	—	—	Samson & Delilah
2015	"Shift"	—	—	—	—	—	Glitch
2015	"Lazarus"	—	—	—	—	—	Glitch
2015	"Sacrifice"	—	—	—	—	—	Glitch
2023	"Black British"	—	—	—	—	—	Am I British Yet?
2023	"Twisted"	—	—	—	—	—	Am I British Yet?
2023	"Marginalised"	—	—	—	—	—	Am I British Yet?
2023	"No Fear" (featuring Liam Bailey)	—	—	—	—	—	Am I British Yet?
2023	"History"	—	—	—	—	—	Am I British Yet?
"—" denotes a single that did not chart or was not released.

=== As featured artist ===
Year	Single	Peak position		Album
Year	Single	UK	FRA	Album
2009	"I Got Soul" (as part of Young Soul Rebels)	10	—	War Child UK
2011	"J'ai fait tout ça pour vous" (with Mélissa Nkonda)	—	65	Nouveaux Horizons
2011	"Des ricochets" (with Collectif Paris-Africa)	—	5	Collectif Paris-Africa pour l'UNICEF
2011	"Voices" (with The Bottletop Band)	—	—	Dream Service
2013	"Bullet" (with All About She)	—	—	—
"—" denotes a single that did not chart or was not released.
