= Ycare =

French singer songwriter (born 1983)

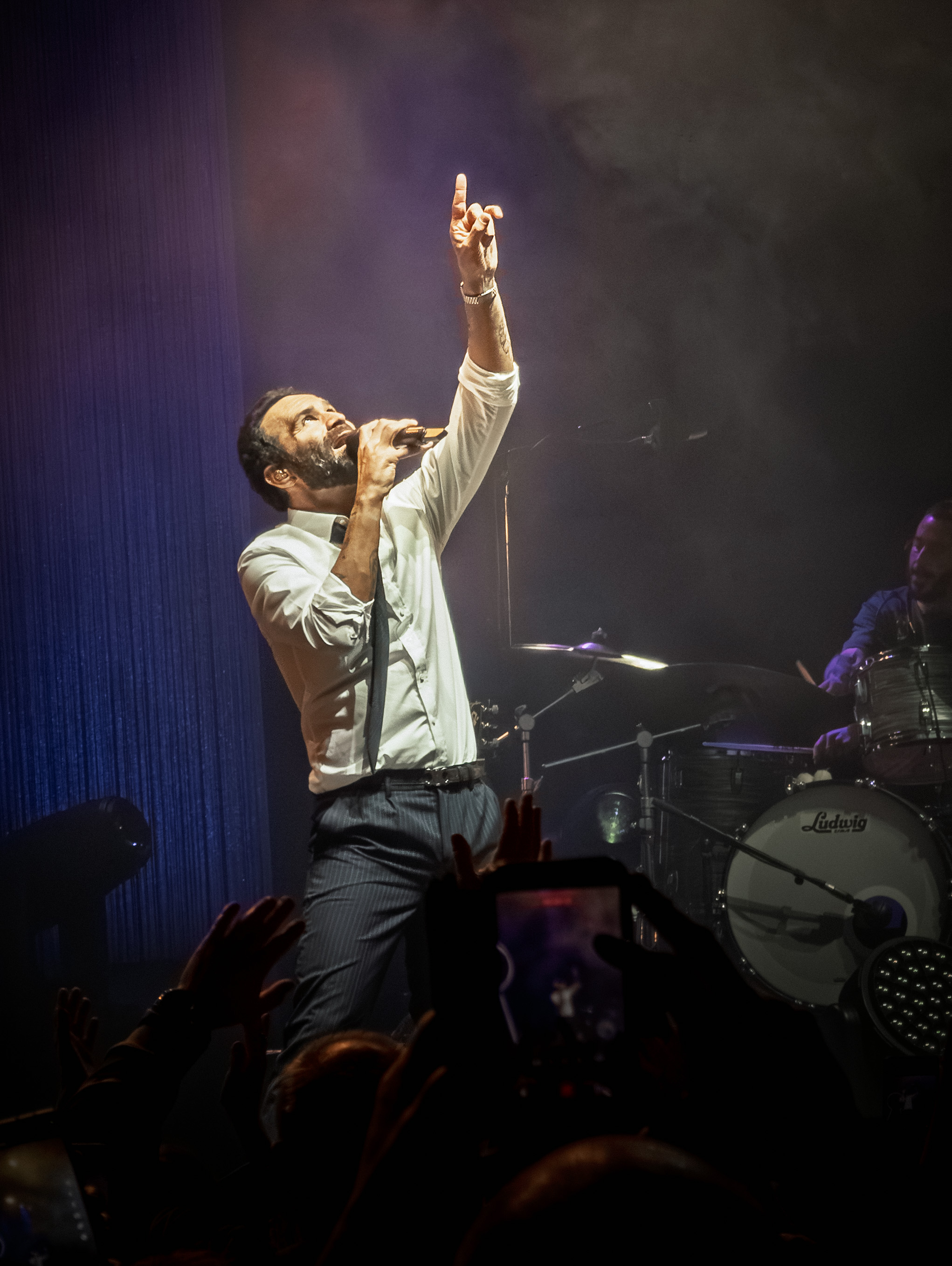
- Ycare performing in 2026

Background information
- Born: Assane Attyé; 21 September 1983 (age 43); Dakar, Senegal
- Label: Sony Music France (2009-2015)

Assane Attyé (Arabic: حسن عطية, born 21 September 1983), better known by his stage name, Ycare, is a French singer-songwriter who was first known as a contestant in Nouvelle Star before launching a solo career, releasing four studio albums, Au bord du monde (2009), Lumière noire (2011), La Somone (2014), and Adieu je t'aime (2018), and a live album, Un tour sans fin (2016).

== Beginnings ==
Attyé was born in Dakar, Senegal, to Lebanese parents. He had an accident when young that left him immobilized; as a result, he took up the guitar. After obtaining his high school diploma, he moved to France to continue his education and sang in various cafés in the Montpellier region. Then he resided in Paris for an MBA degree and became a commodities trader.

== Nouvelle Star ==
Attyé took part in the casting for Nouvelle Star, in its sixth season, a music competition show in French on the M6 channel, using the stage name Ycare Cavens for an opportunity to sing in front of judges André Manoukian, Lio, Sinclair, and Philippe Manœuvre. The season started on 2 April 2008 and continued until 11 June 2008. His performances included:

Date	Song title	Original performer	Result
2 April 2008	"Le Chanteur"	Daniel Balavoine	Moved to next round
9 April 2008	"Ma gueule"	Johnny Hallyday	Bottom 2. Moved to next round
16 April 2008	"It's Oh So Quiet"	Betty Hutton	Moved to next round
23 April 2008	"Un homme heureux"	William Sheller	Bottom 2. Moved to next round
30 April 2008	"Le vent de l'hiver"	Raphaël	Bottom 3. Moved to next round
7 May 2008	"Mistral gagnant"	Renaud	Bottom 2. Moved to next round
7 May 2008	"Crazy"	Gnarls Barkley	Bottom 2. Moved to next round
15 May 2008	"Je suis un homme"	Daniel Balavoine	Bottom 3. Moved to next round
15 May 2008	"Relax, Take It Easy"	Mika	Bottom 3. Moved to next round
22 May 2008	"Quand on arrive en ville"	Michel Polnareff	Bottom 2. Moved to next round
22 May 2008	"Bang Bang (My Baby Shot Me Down)"	Nancy Sinatra	Bottom 2. Moved to next round
28 May 2008	"Déshabillez-moi"	Juliette Gréco	Bottom 2. Eliminated. Finished 4th
28 May 2008	"The Show Must Go On"	Queen	Bottom 2. Eliminated. Finished 4th

Ycare was eliminated after his performances on 28 May 2008, finishing fourth for the season, with the title going to Amandine Bourgeois, Benjamin Siksou as runner-up, and Cédric Oheix as third.

== Career after Nouvelle Star ==
Immediately after Nouvelle Star, he returned to Dakar to record some of his work at Youssou N'Dour's studio. Ycare gave two concerts in Dakar in front of 2000 people, followed by a show at Fnac Montparnasse and a concert at Glaz'art in Paris to a full house.

In 2009, a year after Nouvelle Star, he released his debut album Au bord du monde on 29 June 2009 at Jive Epic (Sony Music). It was produced by Patrice Renson and Olivier Lude, with "Alison" as the first single from the album.

On 6 June 2011, he released his second album, Lumière Noire, with "Lap Dance" becoming his first charting hit single in the French charts. He is also well known for tracks like "Schizophrène" and "S.E.EX" and has collaborated with Zula in "Vite fait".

La Somone is his third album released in 2014. Two singles were released: "Pourvu que tu viennes" and "Sors". The video for "Pourvu que tu viennes" was shot in Dakar, Senegal.

In 2015, Ycare decided to become independent and raised €36,232 on KissKissBankBank from 663 contributors.

In 2019, he performed at the Bataclan in Paris.

== Collaborative albums ==
In October 2022, Ycare released the album Des millions d'années, an album of duets featuring artists such as Zaz, Amel Bent, Ibrahim Maalouf, and Tiken Jah Fakoly. The song Animaux fragiles, performed with Zaz, was one of the album’s most notable tracks.

He continued this collaborative approach with Nos Futurs in 2023, a project focused on artistic encounters following the isolation of the COVID-19 pandemic. The album features collaborations with several French-speaking artists, including Patrick Bruel, Garou, Slimane, and Claudio Capéo.

== 2025: Ycare ==
In 2025, he released a self-titled album, Ycare, exploring themes such as love, spirituality, and personal growth. The album is structured in two parts, Ciel et Terre (“Heaven and Earth”), reflecting a contrast between spiritual elevation and grounded human experience.

It includes Le Fou et le Roi, a French adaptation of Viva la Vida by Coldplay, created with the band’s authorization after Ycare contacted Chris Martin.

== Writing ==
In 2024, he published his first book, Tout le monde naît avec des ailes (“Everyone Is Born with Wings”), an autobiographical and poetic work about resilience, personal transformation, and emotional recovery.

== Project "Sur les chemins de Vendée" ==
In 2026, Ycare launched Sur les chemins de Vendée ("Along the Paths of Vendée”), a walking and concert tour across the Vendée department. Between 25 May and 17 June, he walked nearly 300 km (190 mi) in twelve stages, giving an acoustic concert in a different town at the end of each day. The project was supported by the Vendée Department as part of its cultural outreach programme. The tour brought together hundreds of walkers and several thousand spectators, while promoting the department's cultural and natural heritage, including the Vendée coastline, the Marais Poitevin, the bocage and the Yon Valley.

== Songwriting ==
Writing most of his music, Ycare has become a successful songwriter for a number of artists, including songs for Nolwenn Leroy, Garou, Louis Delort and Joyce Jonathan. Although using the pseudonym Ycare for his own releases, he continues to credit his birth name, Assane Attyé, for his songwriting contributions.

He wrote and composed the song "Bonjour, pardon, merci" ('Hello, sorry, thank you') for Celine Dion, released in 2026, marking their first collaboration.

== Awards and media ==
In 2016, Ycare received the Songwriter of the Year award at the 6th edition of the Prix de la Création Musicale, organized by the CSDEM (Chambre Syndicale de l’Édition Musicale, the French Music Publishers’ Association), in Paris.

In 2025, he won season 8 of the French television show Mask Singer, performing under the rabbit costume.

== Charity work ==
In 2011, he became part of Collectif Paris-Africa, a French group and French-speaking international artists united by UNICEF. Its purpose is to collect money for nutrition and food for the poor countries in the Horn of Africa. The group released a single called "Des ricochets" ("skimming stones"), referring to the poor availability of fresh water in the area, which was followed by the compilation album Collectif Paris-Africa pour l'Unicef.

Ycare was part of the charity song "Les voix de l'enfant" (meaning the voices of the child) with other artists that included Yannick Noah, Lorie, M. Pokora, Mélissa Nkonda, Hugues Aufray, Joyce Jonathan, Nicolas Peyrac, Sheryfa Luna, Grégoire, Jenifer, Merwan Rim, Gérard Lenorman, Emmanuel Moire, Dominique Magloire, Mani, Priscilla, Mickael Miro, Rose, Philippe Lavil, Marie Myriam, Mikelangelo Loconte, Melissa Mars, Faudel, Anggun, Stanisla, Julie Zenatti, Colonel Reyel, Annie Cordy, Yves Duteil, Pauline Delpech, Pierre Souchon, Judith, Quentin Mosimann, Lââm, Michael Jones, Cylia, and Collectif Métissé. The release was funded through a campaign with My Major Company. and was released in 2013.

Since 2025, Ycare has been a Friend of UNICEF France. Recently, he has hosted a UNICEF information stand during his concert tours in order to raise awareness of the organization’s work.

== Discography ==
=== Studio albums ===
Year	Album	Peak positions	
Year	Album	FRA	BEL (Wa)
2009	Au bord du monde	21	-
2011	Lumière noire	30	-
2014	La Somone	47	74
2018	Adieu je t'aime	-	140
2022	Des millions d'années	62	93
2023	Nos futurs	-	50
2025	Ycare	25	34
2026	Brel	45	10

=== Live albums ===
Year	Album
2016	Un tour sans fin

=== EPs ===
- 2015: Hiver 2015
- 2016: Été 2016

=== Singles ===
Year	Single	Peak positions		Album
Year	Single	FRA	BEL (Wa)	Album
2009	"Alison"	—	—	Au bord du monde
2011	"Lap Dance"	48	2*	Lumière noire
2011	"S.E.Ex"	—	24*	Lumière noire
2014	"Sors"	98	30*	La Somone
2019	"D'autre que nous" (with Axelle Red)	—	14	
2022	"Animaux fragiles" (with Zaz)	—	—	
2023	"Origami" (with Patrick Bruel)	—	42	

*Did not appear in the official Belgian Ultratop 50 charts, but rather in the bubbling under Ultratip charts.

== Videography ==
- 2009: "Alison"
- 2009: "J'y crois encore"
- 2011: "Lap Dance"
- 2011: "S.E.Ex"
- 2012: "Une vie"
- 2012: "Arrête" (with Florent Mothe)
- 2013: "Pourvu que tu viennes"
- 2013: "Sors"
- 2015: "La mer à voir"
- 2016: "Love You (J'te déteste)"
- 2017: "D'autres que nous (14 Boulevard Saint-Michel)"
- 2018: "Cette moitié de nous"
- 2018: "Adieu je t'aime"
- 2018: "A qui la faute" (with Hoshi)
