= Collectif Paris-Africa =

French band

- Origin: France
- Genres: French Pop
- Years active: 2011–present
- Labels: WEA Music, a division of Warner Music France

Collectif Paris Africa (Paris-Africa Collective) is a French group and French speaking international artists united by UNICEF. Its purpose is to collect money for nutrition and food for the poor countries in Horn of Africa (Eritrea, Djibouti, Ethiopia and Somalia). The group released a single called "Des ricochets" ("skimming stones"), referring to the poor availability of fresh water in the area) which was followed by compilation album Collectif Paris-Africa pour l'Unicef.

== List of artists ==
- Alizée
- Alpha Blondy
- Alain Chamfort
- Amaury Vassili
- Amine
- Amel Bent
- Anggun
- Arielle Dombasle
- Benabar
- Bob Sinclar
- Chico & Les Gypsies
- Chimène Badi
- Christophe Willem
- Claudia Tagbo
- Colonel Reyel
- Dave
- David Hallyday
- Didier Wampas
- Elisa Tovati
- Fatals Picards
- Florent Mothe
- Gary Fico
- Gérard Lenorman
- Grégoire
- Hélène Ségara
- Inna Modja
- Jane Birkin
- Jenifer
- BB Brunes
- Jérôme Commandeur
- Jérôme Van Den Hole
- John Mamann
- Joyce Jonathan
- Judith
- Julie Zenatti
- Kenza Farah
- Lââm
- Liane Foly
- M Pokora
- Magic System
- Manu Katché
- Maurane
- Mélissa Nkonda
- Merwan Rim
- Mickael Miro
- Mikelangelo Loconte
- Mimie Mathy
- Moïse N’Tumba
- Mokobe
- Natasha St-Pier
- Nicolas Peyrac
- Nolwenn Leroy
- Nyco Lilliu
- Olivier de Benoist
- Ophélie Winter
- Passi
- Patrick Fiori
- Peps
- Philippe Lavil
- Quentin Mosimann
- Salvatore Adamo
- Shy'm
- Sofia Essaidi
- Soprano
- Tal
- Tiken Jah Fakoly
- Tina Arena
- VV Brown
- Ycare

== Discography ==
=== Albums ===
Year	Title	Chart positions
Year	Title	FRA
2012	Collectif Paris-Africa Pour l'Unicef	23

=== Singles ===
Year	Title	Chart positions		Album
Year	Title	FRA	BEL (Wa)	Album
2012	Des ricochets	5	47	Collectif Paris-Africa Pour l'Unicef
