= J'ai fait tout ça pour vous =

Single by Mélissa Nkonda featuring V V Brown

from the album Nouveaux Horizons
- Released: 1 August 2011
- Recorded: 2011
- Genre: Pop
- Length: 2:46
- Label: AZ
- Songwriters: Niara Scarlett, Blair Mackichan, Mounir Maarouf, V.V. Brown, Melissa NKonda
- Producers: Yorgos Benardos, Mounir Maarouf

Mélissa Nkonda singles chronology
"Nouveaux horizons" (2011)	"J'ai fait tout ça pour vous" (2011)

V V Brown singles chronology
"Game Over" (2009)	"J'ai fait tout ça pour vous" (2011)	"Children" (2011)

"J'ai fait tout ça pour vous" is a song performed by French singer Mélissa Nkonda featuring vocals from English singer V V Brown. It was released in France on 1 August 2011. It has peaked to number 65 on the French Singles Chart.

== Music video ==
A music video to accompany the release of "J'ai Fait Tout Ca Pour Vous" was first released onto YouTube on 17 July 2011 at a total length of two minutes and forty-eight seconds.

== Track listing ==
Promo Digital download
No.	Title	Length
1.	"J'ai fait tout ça pour vous"	2:46

== Credits and personnel ==
- Lead vocals – Melissa Nkonda and V V Brown
- Producers – Yorgos Benardos, Mounir Maarouf
- Lyrics – Niara Scarlett, Blair Mackichan, Mounir Maarouf, V.V. Brown, Melissa NKonda
- Label: AZ

== Chart performance ==
Chart (2011)	Peak position
France (SNEP)	65
