= Dansons =

Single by Celine Dion
- Language: French
- Released: 17 April 2026
- Recorded: September 2025
- Studio: At the Palms (Las Vegas)
- Genre: Pop
- Length: 3:26
- Label: Sony
- Songwriter: Jean-Jacques Goldman
- Producers: Jean-Jacques Goldman; Luc Leroy; Yann Macé

Celine Dion singles chronology
"A New Day" (2025)	"Dansons" (2026)	"Bonjour, pardon, merci" (2026)

Lyric video
- "Dansons" on YouTube

"Dansons" (lit. 'Let's dance') is a song by Canadian singer Celine Dion, released on 17 April 2026 through Sony Music. Written by Jean-Jacques Goldman and produced by Goldman, Luc Leroy, and Yann Macé, it marks Dion's first collaboration with Goldman since the 2016 single "Encore un soir". Issued shortly after the announcement of her Paris concert residency, the track is Dion's first new French-language studio recording since resuming public activity following her diagnosis of stiff-person syndrome and the cancellation of the Courage World Tour, and her first original French song in a decade.

Critics responded positively, describing it as a sensitive and intimate ballad and praising its understated production and themes of hope and resilience. "Dansons" debuted at number one in Quebec and at number three in Belgium's Wallonia. In France, it reached number seven on the radio chart and number 25 on the singles chart, and it also peaked at number five on Billboard's World Digital Song Sales chart.

== Background and release ==
In July 2024, Dion appeared during the opening ceremony of the Summer Olympics in Paris, performing "Hymne à l'amour" in a widely covered segment. A live version of the performance was released in October 2024, becoming her first musical issue since announcing her diagnosis of stiff-person syndrome in 2022, which had led to the cancellation of the Courage World Tour.

On 30 March 2026, Dion announced Paris concert residency, a series of concerts scheduled at Paris La Défense Arena. The announcement marked her formal return to live performance after several years of limited public activity. "Dansons" was released on 17 April 2026 as a digital and streaming single through Sony Music, positioned as her first new French-language studio single since the resumption of her professional work.

== Composition and production ==
"Dansons" was written by Jean-Jacques Goldman, who had previously collaborated with Dion on several major French-language projects, including the 1995 album D'eux and the 2016 single "Encore un soir". Dion recorded the track in September 2025. Goldman co-produced it with Luc Leroy and Yann Macé. Leroy and Macé have worked together as the French composer–producer duo Trak Invaders since 2004. By the early 2010s they had established a steady career, which led to their selection in 2012 to produce the tribute albums Génération Goldman and Génération Goldman Volume 2, including new versions of Goldman's songs. Their work on these projects prompted Goldman to involve them in several of his later compositions for other artists, including Dion's "Encore un soir" and later, "Dansons". The song's production incorporates piano, programming, and drum programming, while vocal production was handled by Scott Price and François Lalonde. Mastering was completed by Vlado Meller, with Andy Rivas serving as assistant mastering engineer.

Although its title suggests a dance track, "Dansons" is a ballad. It opens with sparse piano accompaniment before Dion's soft vocal enters, and the arrangement remains minimal throughout. The song, which runs 3:26, does not follow a traditional verse–chorus structure. Dion begins with the line "Let's dance, above the abyss", sung almost a cappella, before additional instruments such as drums and keyboards gradually appear without becoming dominant. Goldman composed the song in 2020 during the uncertainty of the COVID-19 lockdown. In the press release issued with the single, he stated that "six years later, no more virus, but no need to change a word [in the song], the world isn't any better".

== Critical reception ==
Music critics responded positively to "Dansons", praising its gentle, intimate style and Dion's sensitive performance. La Presse described it as a "simple and touching" ballad that creates a slow and intimate atmosphere. The review noted that many listeners wondered how Dion would sound after the health issues shown in I Am: Celine Dion (2024), including a scene where she attempts to sing softly in the studio before experiencing a severe muscle spasm caused by stiff-person syndrome. According to the newspaper, listeners rediscover Dion "from the first seconds", calling her performance "sensitive and delicate". It added that the song is "pure Celine Dion and pure Jean-Jacques Goldman", and said it could have fit on D'eux, although its lyrics "almost imperceptibly" reflect present-day experiences.

Léo Mercier-Ross of Le Devoir wrote that, with drums, keyboards, and a piano placed in the background to highlight Dion's voice, she delivers an "undeniably high-quality" ballad in her usual style. He described the song as "pure, unadulterated Celine Dion, nothing more, nothing less", adding that it mixes "elegance, optimism, and emotional depth". Sarah-Émilie Nault of Le Journal de Montréal called "Dansons" a "hopeful song". She wrote that, despite its title, it is more of a ballad than a dance track, sung softly and sometimes almost whispered, and that it "evokes the gentleness and strength" found in "Les derniers seront les premiers" from D'eux. She added that the song does not have the "grand flourishes" of "Pour que tu m'aimes encore", but instead uses lyrics about humanity's ability to overcome the world's misfortunes, which Dion delivers with particular sensitivity.

CNews wrote that Dion's voice remains powerful despite her illness, expressing both "resilience and the harshness of the world around her". Anne-Fleur Andrle of The Huffington Post France wrote that the song shows "fighting spirit and resilience in the face of the world's turmoil", while also reflecting Dion's health struggles. She highlighted the lyric "we can only dance standing up" and described the refrain as a repeated call to stay strong. Fabien Fourel of Ici wrote that "Dansons" explores fragility and strength in a world described as "unbalanced". He noted that the slow-tempo track mixes images of "movement and resistance", using dance as a metaphor for survival. Fourel added that the song suggests Dion is turning personal challenges into artistic expression, showing determination, dignity, and a quiet sense of solidarity with others who keep going despite difficulties.

== Commercial performance ==
"Dansons" debuted on several international charts following its release in April 2026. In francophone markets, it entered Belgium's Wallonia listing at number three, becoming Dion's highest-charting release there since 2002, when "I'm Alive" reached number two. In France, it reached number 25 on the singles ranking, her highest entry since the 2016 number-one "Encore un soir". It also opened at number seven on the French Top Radio list, her best result on that chart since "Sous le vent" placed at number three in 2001.

The song debuted atop the Quebec ADISQ chart which combines radio airplay, streaming, and digital sales. Elsewhere in Europe, "Dansons" peaked at number 53 in Switzerland and reached number 57 on the UK Singles Downloads Chart.

In North America, the track entered the Canadian Hot 100 at number 68 and also debuted at number 16 on the Canadian Adult Contemporary chart. In the United States, it opened at number five on Billboard's World Digital Song Sales chart, becoming Dion's second appearance on that ranking after the number-four "Hymne à l'amour" in 2024.

== Music video ==
A lyric video for the song, filmed in the streets of Paris, was released alongside the track on 17 April 2026. Directed by Maxime Allouche, it depicts various couples dancing and embracing across the French capital, including iconic Parisian locations. Allouche invited several artists to appear in the video, including classical dancer Victoria Dauberville and her partner Mathieu Forget, violinist Esther Abrami, comedian Lola Dubini, and the young performer Oria, among others. The video does not include an on-screen appearance by Dion. According to the production team, her absence reflects a choice to favor a symbolic and poetic approach that matches the song's intimate tone and its focus on quiet strength and optimism.

== Credits and personnel ==
Credits were adapted from Apple Music.

- Celine Dion – lead vocals
- Jean-Jacques Goldman – songwriting, production, arrangement
- Luc Leroy – production, arrangement, piano, programming
- Yann Macé – production, arrangement, drum programming, mixing
- Scott Price – vocal producer
- François Lalonde – vocal producer, vocal recording
- Vlado Meller – mastering
- Andy Rivas – assistant mastering

== Charts ==
Chart performance
Chart (2026)	Peak position
Belgium (Ultratop 50 Wallonia)	3
Canada Hot 100 (Billboard)	68
Canada AC (Billboard)	16
Finland Airplay (Radiosoittolista)	22
France (SNEP)	25
France Airplay (SNEP)	7
Quebec (ADISQ)	1
Switzerland (Schweizer Hitparade)	53
Switzerland Airplay (IFPI)	41
Switzerland French Airplay (Swiss Hitparade)	12
UK Singles Downloads (Official Charts)	57
US World Digital Song Sales (Billboard)	5

== Release history ==
Release history
Region	Date	Format	Label	Ref.
Various	17 April 2026	Digital download; streaming	Sony	
Italy	17 April 2026	Contemporary hit radio	Sony	
