= Collectif Paris-Africa pour l'UNICEF =

Compilation album by Collectif Paris-Africa
- Released: 5 December 2011 (France)
- Recorded: 2011
- Genre: French pop
- Length: 1:57:31
- Label: WEA, a subsidiary of Warner Music France

Singles from Collectif Paris-Africa pour l'UNICEF
- 1. "Des ricochets" Released: 25 October 2011

Collectif Paris-Africa pour l'UNICEF (English: Paris-Africa collective for UNICEF) is the first album by group Collectif Paris-Africa formed by UNICEF. It was released in France on 5 December 2011 . The first single called "Des ricochets" was released on 25 October 2011. The profits of the album will go to humanitary aid for the people in Horn of Africa. The album has two discs.

== Track listing ==
Disc 1

1. "Des ricochets" (several artists) – 3:38
2. "Elle me dit" (Mika) – 3:39
3. "La jument de Michao" (Nolwenn Leroy) – 2:56
4. "Un peu de blues" (Christophe Maé) – 3:32
5. "Where Them Girls At (feat. Nicki Minaj & Flo Rida)" (David Guetta) – 3:14
6. "Le jour après la fin du monde" (Corneille) – 3:31
7. "La danse des magiciens (radio edit)" (Magic System) – 3:51
8. "Lap Dance" (Ycare) – 3:43
9. "Celui" (Colonel Reyel) – 3:20
10. "Je danse" (Jénifer) – 3:12
11. "Tourne (radio edit)" (Shy'M) – 3:28
12. "Le même que moi (feat. Léo Rispal)" (Gary Fico) – 3:07
13. "On avance" (Tal) – 3:09
14. "Ton héritage" (Benjamin Biolay) – 4:21
15. "Je partirai" (Anggun) – 4:22
16. "C'est bientot la fin" (Mozart Opera Rock) – 3:46
17. "Les jours heureux" (Gerard Lenorman & Shy'M) – 3:46

Disc 2

1. "Il nous faut" (Elisa Tovati & Tom Dice) – 3:06
2. "French Cancan" (Inna Modja) – 3:35
3. "La fée" (Zaz) – 3:21
4. "Far l'amore (radio edit)" (Bob Sinclar & Raffaella Carrà) – 3:02
5. "J'aimerais trop" (Keen'v feat. SAP) – 3:45
6. "A nous actes manqués" (M. Pokora) – 3:45
7. "Oulala" (Mokobé feat. Yorobo) – 3:41
8. "Je ne sais pas" (Joyce Jonathan) – 3:19
9. "Lady Melody" (Tom Frager) – 3:56
10. "Dis moi" (BB Brunes) – 2:24
11. "Non non non (ecouter Barbara)" (Camelia Jordana) – 2:41
12. "Tu ed io pìu lei" (Nico Lilliu) – 3:33
13. "Le retour à la Terre" (Fatals Picards) – 3:52
14. "Là où je vais" (Judith) – 2:58
15. "Sognu" (Amaury Vassili) – 2:55
16. "Soleil" (Grègoire) – 2:53
17. "Naître adulte" (Oxmo Puccino) – 4:10

== Single "Des ricochets" ("Skimming stones") ==
List of participants on the single

- Alizée
- Alpha Blondy
- Amaury Vassili
- Amel Bent
- Anggun
- Arielle Dombasle
- BB Brunes
- Benabar
- Bob Sinclar
- Chico & The Gypsies
- Chimène Badi
- Christophe Willem
- Claudia
- Colonel Reyel
- Dave
- David Hallyday
- Didier Wampas
- Elisa Tovati
- Fatals Picards
- Faudel
- Florent Mothe
- Gary Fico
- Gérard Lenorman
- Grégoire
- Hélène Ségara
- Inna Modja
- Jane Birkin
- Jenifer
- Jérome Van Den Hole
- John Mamann
- Joyce Jonathan
- Judith
- Julie Zenatti
- Kenza Farah
- Lââm
- Liane Foly
- M. Pokora
- Magic System
- Manu Katché
- Maurane
- Melissa Nkonda
- Merwan Rim
- Mickael Miro
- Mikelangelo Loconte
- Mimie Mathy
- Moïse N’Tumba
- Mokobe
- Natasha St-Pier
- Nicolas Peyrac
- Nyco Lilliu
- Nolwenn Leroy
- Olivier De Benoist
- Ophélie Winter
- Passi
- Patrick Fiori
- Peps
- Philippe Lavil
- Quentin Mosimann
- Salvatore Adamo
- Shy'm
- Sofia Essaidi
- Soprano
- Tal
- Tiken Jah Fakoly
- Tina Aréna
- VV Brown
- Ycare
