= Children (V V Brown song) =

Single by V V Brown featuring Chiddy

from the album Lollipops & Politics (Unreleased)
- Released: 20 September 2011 (US)
- Genre: Indie pop
- Length: 3:15
- Label: Capitol Records
- Songwriters: V V Brown, C. Harmon, E. Kidd Bogart & Chidera Anamege

V V Brown singles chronology
"J'ai fait tout ça pour vous" (2010)	"Children" (2011)	"Samson" (2013)

Chiddy singles chronology
"Mind Your Manners" (2011)	"Children" (2011)	"Ray Charles" (2011)

"Children" is a song by English recording artist V V Brown, initially released as the lead single from her shelved second studio album Lollipops & Politics. Written by Brown, the song also guest features American rapper Chiddy and was released to US iTunes on 20 September 2011. Brown later confirmed via Facebook that the song would be released in Europe at a future date; however this planned release was scrapped when Brown decided not to release the album. The song samples "Turkey in the Straw" at the beginning and end.

== Critical reception ==
Rap-Up described 'Children' as an "Irresistible pop-gem that you can knock in your whip or jump rope to." It has been credited for its upbeat catchy tune and boasts an infectious hook.

Arjanwrites gave the song a positive review, complimenting Brown for "serving up something fresh, but also for speaking her mind honestly with a compelling call to action that will leave listeners inspired." They praised Brown for creating a song that is fresh and different, yet distinctly very 'VV Brown.'

== Music video ==
The video is set in downtown Los Angeles and shows Brown riding her bike through the street, playing basketball with the people, dancing down the sidewalk, as well as showing groups of families. The video also shows Brown standing amongst people reflecting the town in a mirror to the camera. Brown described the video as 'Real' and shows her enjoying the simple things in life.

In 2015, four years after the record's cancellation, Brown expressed distaste for the music video, claiming it was a sign that she had "sold her soul."

== Track listings and formats ==
- Single Promo
1. "Children" (feat. Chiddy) – 3:15
- iTunes EP
1. "Children" (feat. Chiddy) – 3:15
2. "Children (Keep On Singing)" – 3:14
3. "Children (Acoustic)" – 3:34
- Children [& Remixes]
1. "Children" (feat. Chiddy) – 3:15
2. "Children (Easy Does It Remix)" – 4:17
3. "Children (Mike Rizzo Funk Radio Remix)" – 3:42
4. "Children (Twice As Nice Radio Remix)" – 3:13
5. "Children (Club Cheval Remix - English Version)" – 3:56
6. "Children (Club Cheval Remix - French Version)" – 3:57

== Release history ==
Country	Release date	Format	Label
United States	September 20, 2011	Digital download	Capitol Records
United States	November 1, 2011	Mainstream airplay	Capitol Records
