= Shark in the Water =

Single by V V Brown

from the album Travelling Like the Light
- Released: 6 July 2009
- Genre: Indie pop; R&B; soul
- Length: 3:02
- Label: Island
- Songwriters: V V Brown; Tommy Tysper; Mack (Marcus Sepehrmanesh)

V V Brown singles chronology
"Leave!" (2009)	"Shark in the Water" (2009)	"I Got Soul" (2009)

Audio sample
- file; help

Music video
- "Shark in the Water" on YouTube

"Shark in the Water" is a song recorded by English singer-songwriter V V Brown for her debut studio album Travelling Like the Light. It was released on 6 July 2009 by Island Records as the album's third single. The song is a metaphorical record about anxiety, and was inspired by Brown's experience with infidelity by a past boyfriend who liked to stalk her in his free time. The song is her first single to get high airplay on U.S. music channels and radio (neither "Leave!" nor "Crying Blood" were able to achieve this). The song was also re-recorded in the Simlish language of The Sims and is featured in The Sims 3: Ambitions. The song is her first single to chart in the U.S. on Billboard Hot 100 peaking at number sixty-seven. The song was certified Gold in the US.

== Music video ==
The video is about Brown finding out that her boyfriend is cheating on her, so she follows him around taking pictures of him with the other girl. At the beginning of the video she starts to record the song on a radio. The video switches between Brown walking by the side of a canal, and under a bridge, to seeing her at a pub table looking at the pictures of her cheating boyfriend. It finishes with a view of her boyfriend's house with a picture on his door and the radio that Brown used to record the song on the doorstep.

== Critical reception ==
Popjustice gave the song a positive review, writing "Immediately brilliant - a reinterpretation rather than a continuation of the 'indie doo wop' schtick she's been working on over the last couple of singles and therefore a lot less stylised and a great deal more accessible." Nick Levine of Digital Spy gave the song 5 out of 5, stating "It begins in bright, breezy fashion, all-girl group backing vocals and guitar-strumming that brings to mind Craig McLachlan's 'Mona', before something a bit magical happens - the arrival of a pure pop chorus as huge and all-consuming as a T.rex that's just come off hunger strike. Crossover radio smash? Here's hoping - but it's hard to see how she could do any more. The song also received a positive review from Female First. In a five-star rating, the song was described as "happy-go-lucky song... but it’s when the powerful, heartfelt chorus kicks in that you really take a breath and think, 'Shit, this song is awesome.' So, it seems the claims that what the press have been saying about this lady finally has some truth in it at last; she really is one of the ladies to watch out for in 2009."

Music OMH writes: "'Shark in the Water' could easily be described as a 'summer anthem', all breezy acoustic strums, insanely catchy melodies and a chorus that explodes seemingly from nowhere. It also features that key ingredient to all great pop songs; a nonsense lyric. 'Baby there's a shark in the water, I caught them barking at the moon' is a wonderfully mixed image, the kind of animal creation a cartoonist would balk at for being too ridiculous."

== Track listings and formats ==
CD Single + Digital Download

1. "Shark in the Water" – 3:04

Amazon MP3

1. "Shark in the Water" – 3:06
2. "Shark in the Water" (Wendel Kos Sunlight Remix) – 7:18
3. "Shark in the Water" (Wendel Kos Dub Remix) – 6:44
4. "Shark in the Water" (Louis La Roche Remix Edit) – 2:49
5. "Shark in the Water" (Louis La Roche Dub Remix) – 3:19

iTunes EP

1. "Shark in the Water" – 3:06
2. "Shark in the Water" (Blame Remix) – 6:01
3. "Shark in the Water" (Wendel Kos Sunlight Remix) – 7:18
4. "Shark in the Water" (Wendel Kos Dub Remix) – 6:44
5. "Shark in the Water" (Louis La Roche Remix Edit) – 2:49
6. "Shark in the Water" (Louis La Roche Dub Remix) – 3:19

Samson & Delilah (Deluxe Edition)

14. "Shark in the Water" (Alternate Version) – 4:57

== Charts ==
Chart (2009–2010)	Peak position
French Singles Chart	13
Swiss Singles Chart	54
UK Singles Chart	34
US Billboard Hot 100	67
US Billboard Hot Dance Club Songs	11
US Hot Adult Contemporary	20

== Release history ==
Country	Release date	Format	Label
United Kingdom	6 July 2009	CD single; digital download	Island
United States	9 February 2010	CD single; digital download	Capitol

== Use in media ==
In 2010, a trailer set to "Shark in the Water" was produced by TeenNick to promote the tenth season of the Canadian teen drama Degrassi. The trailer featured scenes of the series' cast members in circus and carnival-themed settings, many of which containing imagery hinting towards major plot developments that would occur during the season. V V Brown would appear in the promo, while the song itself would later be featured in season 10's midseason finale "All Falls Down (Part Two)". Showrunner Stephen Stohn credited the promo with having significantly increased interest and viewership for Degrassi in Canada and the United States (with the hints in the trailer having resulted in discussion and speculation among the program's fanbase), and having popularized "Shark in the Water" in North America as one of V V Brown's biggest hits.
