= Bonjour, pardon, merci =

Single by Celine Dion
- Language: French
- Released: 3 July 2026
- Recorded: 2026
- Studio: At the Palms (Las Vegas)
- Genre: Pop
- Length: 3:10
- Label: Sony
- Songwriters: Ycare; Renaud Rebillaud
- Producer: Renaud Rebillaud

Celine Dion singles chronology
"Dansons" (2026)	"Bonjour, pardon, merci" (2026)

Lyric video
- "Bonjour, pardon, merci" on YouTube

"Bonjour, pardon, merci" (lit. 'Hello, sorry, thank you') is a song by Canadian singer Celine Dion, released on 3 July 2026 through Sony Music. Written by Ycare and Renaud Rebillaud and produced by Rebillaud, the song was inspired by the Hawaiian practice of Hoʻoponopono, whose morning recitation, focused on forgiveness, gratitude, and emotional release, helped shape its thematic direction. It followed the April 2026 release of "Dansons". A 12-inch vinyl single containing both songs was issued on 4 September 2026, shortly before the start of Dion's Paris concert residency. On 25 September 2026, a remix by French production duo Bon Entendeur was released as a digital and streaming single. "Bonjour, pardon, merci" reached number one in Quebec and number five on the Canadian Digital Song Sales chart.

== Music video ==
An animated lyric video for the song, created by Chinese-Canadian motion artist Yoho Yue, premiered alongside the track on 3 July 2026.

== Formats and track listing ==
- Digital and streaming single
1. "Bonjour, pardon, merci" – 3:10
- 12-inch single
1. "Bonjour, pardon, merci" – 3:10
2. "Bonjour, pardon, merci" (instrumental) – 3:09
3. "Dansons" – 3:28
4. "Dansons" (instrumental) – 3:25
- Digital and streaming single
1. "Bonjour, pardon, merci" (Bon Entendeur remix) – 2:51

== Credits and personnel ==
Credits adapted from Tidal.

- Celine Dion – lead vocals
- Ycare – lyricist, composer
- Renaud Rebillaud – composer, production, piano, drum programming, programming
- Jérémie Tui – mixing engineer
- François Lalonde – vocal producer, vocal recording engineer
- Scott Price – vocal producer

== Charts ==
Chart performance
Chart (2026)	Peak position
Belgium (Ultratop 50 Wallonia)	38
Canada Digital Song Sales (Billboard)	5
France (SNEP)	126
France Airplay (SNEP)	27
Romania Airplay (TopHit)	87
Switzerland French Airplay (Swiss Hitparade)	20
Quebec (ADISQ)	1
UK Singles Downloads (Official Charts)	70

== Release history ==
Release history
Region	Date	Format	Label	Ref.
Various	3 July 2026	Digital download; streaming	Sony	
Italy	3 July 2026	Contemporary hit radio	Sony	
Various	4 September 2026	12-inch vinyl	Sony	
Various	25 September 2026	Digital download; streaming	Sony	
