= Celine Dion Paris 2026–2027 =

2026–2027 concert residency

- Residency by Celine Dion
- Location: Nanterre, France
- Venue: Plenitude Arena
- Start date: 12 September 2026
- End date: 29 May 2027
- No. of shows: 26
- Attendance: 539,000
- Box office: $125.5 million

Celine Dion concert chronology
- Courage World Tour (2019–2020); Celine Dion Paris (2026–2027)

Celine Dion Paris 2026–2027 is a concert residency by the Canadian singer Celine Dion, taking place at the Plenitude Arena in Nanterre, France. Announced in March 2026, the engagement marks Dion's return to live performance following an extended hiatus caused by health issues and the cancellation of the Courage World Tour. The 26-concert residency, split into two parts, began on 12 September 2026 and is scheduled to conclude on 29 May 2027. It generated exceptional demand, with more than nine million fans entering a lottery for early access to tickets and all shows selling out within hours. The residency's first leg in September and October 2026 grossed $125.5 million from 16 shows, averaging $7.8 million per night to become the fastest-grossing residency in history.

== Background ==
On 30 March 2026, Dion released a video message filmed beneath the Eiffel Tower, confirming her first live performances in several years. In the announcement, she thanked fans for their support and described the residency as "the best birthday gift" she could imagine. She added that she felt strong, excited, and grateful to be returning to the stage.

Dion's team described the residency as a landmark engagement at Europe's largest indoor arena, placing her among a select group of artists to headline Plenitude Arena for an extended run. The production is overseen by creative director Willo Perron, known for larger‑scale arena concepts. According to the official announcement, the concerts will present many of Dion's most recognizable French- and English-language songs, intended as a tribute to the catalogue that has defined her career. On 7 April, Dion added six additional dates to the residency due to demand. That June, ten concerts to take place in May 2027 were announced.

== Ticketing and partnerships ==
Artist presale access opened on 7 April 2026, with registration available until 2 April. Fair AXS operated a registration system in which all eligible entries were considered equally; selection did not guarantee the ability to purchase tickets. Visa, a partner of the residency, offered cardholders priority access from 8 April until 9 April. General ticket sales began on 10 April. A limited number of "Ticket and Hotel Experience Packages" and VIP packages were made available through Dion's official website.

Marriott Bonvoy served as the official hotel partner for the engagement, offering VIP experiences and Moments packages that combined tickets with hotel stays in Paris. The residency was produced by Concerts West, AEG Presents, and Inter Concerts.

== Critical reception ==
Neil McCormick of The Daily Telegraph described the performance as the "riskiest comeback in the history of showbusiness". McCormick noted that although her voice sounded fragile, he preferred this "less superhuman Céline... raw and real, with a rougher tone, less smoothness in the runs and more edge..." Writing for Rolling Stone, Alma Rota observed that while Dion "spent much of her life demanding almost impossible perfection from herself", her later performances embraced visible vulnerability and risk.

== Commercial performance ==
More than nine million fans entered a lottery for early access to the sale in order to secure tickets. All 16 shows of the 2026 portion of the residency, accounting for more than 480,000 tickets, sold out in record time within just a few hours, reflecting the exceptionally strong demand for Dion's return to the stage. Several media outlets described the residency as one of the major musical events of the year.

According to figures reported to Billboard Boxscore, the first leg of Dion's residency grossed $125.5 million and sold 539,000 tickets across 16 shows in September and October 2026. On a per-night basis, her 2026 dates averaged $7.8 million, surpassing U2's residency at the Sphere, which had grossed $6.1 million per show to become the fastest-grossing residency at the time. Further, Dion's average attendance of 33,700 per show is nearly double the next best per-show attendance for any residency in the Boxscore archives, ahead of Billy Joel, who averaged 18,600 tickets per concert during his tenure at Madison Square Garden.

== Accolades ==
Celine Dion Paris 2026–2027 was nominated for Francophone Concert of the Year at the 2026 NRJ Music Awards.

== Set list ==
This set list is from the concert on 12 September 2026.

Act I

1. "On ne change pas"
2. "Destin"
3. "Because You Loved Me"
4. "Encore un soir"
5. "Les derniers seront les premiers"
6. "Tout l'or des hommes"
7. "The Power of Love"

Act II

8. "My Heart Will Go On"
9. "Beauty and the Beast"
10. "The Chase"
11. "J'irai où tu iras"
12. "Ne bouge pas"
13. "Dans un autre monde"
14. "I Feel Love" / "I'm Alive" / "That's the Way It Is" / "Sweet Dreams (Are Made of This)"

Act III

15. "Dansons"
16. "Un garçon pas comme les autres (Ziggy)"
17. "Courage"

Act IV

18. "Love Can Move Mountains"
19. "The Prayer"
20. "It's All Coming Back to Me Now"
21. "Je chanterai"
22. "Ebben? Ne andrò lontana"

Encore

23. "All by Myself"
24. "Pour que tu m'aimes encore"
25. "S'il suffisait d'aimer"
26. "Des milliers de baisers"

=== Alterations ===
- Beginning with the 18 September 2026 concert, "Des milliers de baisers" was removed from the set list and "S'il suffisait d'aimer" was performed in place of "Dansons".
- On 17 October 2026, Dion closed her show with "Bonjour, pardon, merci", performing it after "Pour que tu m'aimes encore".

== Shows ==
List of 2026 shows
Date (2026)	City	Country	Venue	Attendance	Revenue
12 September	Nanterre (Note: Labelled as Paris in promotional material.)	France	Plenitude Arena	539,000	$125,500,000
16 September	Nanterre	France	Plenitude Arena	539,000	$125,500,000
18 September	Nanterre	France	Plenitude Arena	539,000	$125,500,000
19 September	Nanterre	France	Plenitude Arena	539,000	$125,500,000
23 September	Nanterre	France	Plenitude Arena	539,000	$125,500,000
25 September	Nanterre	France	Plenitude Arena	539,000	$125,500,000
26 September	Nanterre	France	Plenitude Arena	539,000	$125,500,000
30 September	Nanterre	France	Plenitude Arena	539,000	$125,500,000
2 October	Nanterre	France	Plenitude Arena	539,000	$125,500,000
3 October	Nanterre	France	Plenitude Arena	539,000	$125,500,000
7 October	Nanterre	France	Plenitude Arena	539,000	$125,500,000
9 October	Nanterre	France	Plenitude Arena	539,000	$125,500,000
10 October	Nanterre	France	Plenitude Arena	539,000	$125,500,000
14 October	Nanterre	France	Plenitude Arena	539,000	$125,500,000
16 October	Nanterre	France	Plenitude Arena	539,000	$125,500,000
17 October	Nanterre	France	Plenitude Arena	539,000	$125,500,000

List of 2027 shows
Date (2027)	City	Country	Venue	Attendance	Revenue
8 May	Nanterre	France	Plenitude Arena	—	—
12 May	Nanterre	France	Plenitude Arena	—	—
14 May	Nanterre	France	Plenitude Arena	—	—
15 May	Nanterre	France	Plenitude Arena	—	—
19 May	Nanterre	France	Plenitude Arena	—	—
21 May	Nanterre	France	Plenitude Arena	—	—
22 May	Nanterre	France	Plenitude Arena	—	—
26 May	Nanterre	France	Plenitude Arena	—	—
28 May	Nanterre	France	Plenitude Arena	—	—
29 May	Nanterre	France	Plenitude Arena	—	—

== Band ==
Dion's backing band includes:

- Scott Price – musical director
- Guillaume Marchand – keyboard
- Yves Labonté – bass
- Dominique Messier – drums
- Paul Picard – percussion
- Kaven Girouard – guitar
- Jeff Smallwood – guitar
- Philippe Dunnigan – string quartet
- Jerome Gordon – string quartet
- Judy Kang – string quartet
- Simon Royer – string quartet
- Dawn Cumberbatch – backing vocals
- Élise Duguay – backing vocals
- Jordan Levesque – backing vocals
- Barnev Valsaint – backing vocals

== See also ==
- List of highest-grossing concert series at a single venue
- List of most-attended concert series at a single venue
