= Glitch (album) =

Studio album by V V Brown
- Released: 25 September 2015
- Recorded: 2014–15
- Genre: Trip hop, electronica, glitch pop, alternative dance
- Label: YOY
- Producer: James Leggett; Bunki

V V Brown chronology
Samson & Delilah (2013)	Glitch (2015)	Am I British Yet? (2023)

Singles from Glitch
- 1. "Shift" Released: 21 August 2015; 2. "Lazarus" Released: 6 September 2015; 3. "Sacrifice" Released: 25 September 2015

Glitch is the third studio album by English singer-songwriter V V Brown, released on 25 September 2015 via Brown's own imprint YOY Records. The album was partially funded via PledgeMusic, with ten per cent of all proceeds going towards Save the Children.

== Track listing ==
No.	Title	Writer(s)	Producer(s)	Length
1.	"Bells"	V V Brown	Bunki	2:10
2.	"Lazarus"	V V Brown	James Leggett	4:30
3.	"Fractured"	V V Brown	James Leggett	3:16
4.	"Instincts"	V V Brown	James Leggett	2:07
5.	"Money Sex Power"	V V Brown	James Leggett	2:39
6.	"Ultraviolet"	V V Brown	James Leggett	4:16
7.	"Violet"	V V Brown	James Leggett	0:42
8.	"Space to Breathe"	V V Brown	James Leggett	3:45
9.	"Flatline"	V V Brown	James Leggett	3:36
10.	"Shift"	V V Brown	James Leggett	3:29
11.	"Talk About This"	V V Brown	James Leggett	3:09
12.	"Sacrifice"	V V Brown	James Leggett	3:21
13.	"Will You Wait"	V V Brown	James Leggett	4:28
