= Samson & Delilah (album) =

Studio album by V V Brown
- Released: 9 September 2013
- Recorded: 2011–13
- Genre: Synth-pop, experimental pop, dark wave, art pop, drone, electropop, industrial pop
- Length: 49:11
- Label: YOY
- Producer: Pascal Gabriel; Liam Howe; Pierre-Marie "STAL" Maulini; Dave Okumu

V V Brown chronology
Lollipops & Politics (Unreleased)	Samson & Delilah (2013)	Glitch (2015)

Singles from Samson & Delilah
- 1. "Samson" Released: 14 July 2013; 2. "The Apple" Released: 25 August 2013; 3. "Faith" Released: 17 March 2014

Samson & Delilah is the second studio album by English recording artist V V Brown, released on 9 September 2013 on Brown's YOY Records. Brown initially had planned to follow up her critically acclaimed debut album with Lollipops and Politics, promoting the release of the album with a debut single. The album was later shelved, in part due to do Brown's own wishes. She then went independent for Samson & Delilah, which found Brown experimenting with a radically different change in musical direction. Samson & Delilah is a concept album based around the biblical story of the same name. A short film using material from the album was used to promote the record.

== Critical reception ==
Professional ratings
Aggregate scores
Source	Rating
Metacritic	82/100
Review scores
Source	Rating
All Music	4/5 stars
Boston Globe	Positive
Pop Matters	8/10 stars

Samson & Delilah received positive reviews from music critics. On Metacritic, the album received a score of 82 from professional sources, indicating "universal acclaim". Most all music critics noted the drastic change in direction that Brown took for the album. Upon announcing a free stream of the album prior to the album's release, Idolator wrote that the record was "one of the boldest 180s between an artist's first and second albums that we've witnessed in a long time. We're talking a Yeezus-level departure from an act's established sonics. If Janelle Monáe is an android, V V Brown is now a T-1000." Ryan Lathan, writing for PopMatters, described the album as "skillfully produced" and "brave", one that "succeeds in forging a completely different identity for Brown," comparing the singer to Annie Lennox and Grace Jones.

== Track listing ==
No.	Title	Writer(s)	Producer(s)	Length
1.	"Substitute for Love"	V V Brown; Pierre-Marie "STAL" Maulini	Maulini	5:03
2.	"Nothing Really Matters"	Brown; Dave Okumu	Dave Okumu	5:10
3.	"Samson"	Brown	Okumu	4:27
4.	"I Can Give You More"	Brown; Maulini	Maulini	4:09
5.	"Igneous"	Brown; Laurence Aldridge	Aldridge	4:45
6.	"Looking for Love"	Brown; Liam Howe	Howe	4:52
7.	"The Apple"	Brown; Pascal Gabriel	Gabriel	3:11
8.	"Faith"	Brown; Aldridge	Aldridge	4:32
9.	"Ghosts"	Brown; Aldridge	Aldridge	2:50
10.	"Knife"	Brown; Maulini	Maulini	4:03
11.	"Beginning"	Brown; Okumu	Okumu	6:09
Total length:				49:11

iTunes Store deluxe edition bonus tracks
No.	Title	Writer(s)	Length
12.	"Warrior"		4:08
13.	"Like Fire"	Brown	6:30
14.	"Shark in the Water" (Alternative Version)	Brown; Tommy Tysper; Marcus Sepehrmanesh	4:57
15.	"Samson & Delilah" (short film)		17:06
Total length:			81:52

French iTunes Store deluxe edition bonus tracks
No.	Title	Writer(s)	Length
12.	"Warrior"		4:08
13.	"Like Fire"	Brown	6:30
14.	"Shark in the Water" (Alternative Version)	Brown; Tysper; Sepehrmanesh	4:57
15.	"The Apple" (En français)		3:14
16.	"Samson & Delilah" (short film)		17:06
Total length:			85:06

== Charts ==
Chart (2013)	Peak position
UK Albums Chart	158
UK Indie Albums Chart	35

== Release history ==
Region	Date	Format	Label
United Kingdom	9 September 2013	CD; LP; digital download	YOY Records
France	7 October 2013	CD; digital download	YOY Records
France	8 October 2013	LP	YOY Records
United States	8 October 2013	CD; digital download	YOY Records
Germany	8 October 2013	Digital download	YOY Records
Germany	18 October 2013	CD; LP	YOY Records
