= Am I British Yet? =

Studio album by V V Brown
- Released: 27 October 2023
- Length: 64:00
- Label: YOY

V V Brown chronology
Glitch (2015)	Am I British Yet? (2023)

Singles from Am I British Yet?
- 1. "Black British" Released: 27 March 2023; 2. "Twisted" Released: 9 June 2023; 3. "Marginalised" Released: 28 July 2023; 4. "No Fear" Released: 1 September 2023; 5. "History" Released: 4 October 2023

Am I British Yet? is the fourth studio album by English singer-songwriter V V Brown. It was released on 27 October 2023, as her first studio record in over eight years.

== Background ==
Brown first tackled the topic of a white-dominated music industry and her experiences as a black female artist in a self-written article for The Guardian in July 2021, encouraging fellow black female musicians to go independent. Following her third studio effort Glitch (2015), the artist would not release new music until March 2023. The lead single "Black British" marked her first musical output in six years, which according to her, she wrote in only 25 minutes. She described the previous six year as "a difficult mental health journey", citing the relocation to the countryside, family life and the liberation from industry pressure as the main factors behind her hiatus. Talking specifically about the album, she revealed that it "is about starting sociological conversations". The "radical power in the role of the provocateur", as Brown puts it, was one of the motives for the album. Additionally, Brown provided an in-depth look into "what it means to be Black in modern Britain" in an interview with Line of Best Fit. The second single "Twisted" was released on 9 June 2023. The track, inspired by the works of James Baldwin and Erykah Badu, talks about the topic of cultural appropriation with the intention of bringing "awareness to the magnitude of the threat". In an interview with James O'Brien, she stated that Am I British Yet? would also be the title of an upcoming book, describing it as "a real generational collection of black Britishness".

== Critical reception ==
Professional ratings
Aggregate scores
Source	Rating
Metacritic	84/100
Review scores
Source	Rating
AllMusic	4/5 stars
The Line of Best Fit	10/10

Am I British Yet? was met with "universal acclaim" reviews from critics. At Metacritic, which assigns a weighted average rating out of 100 to reviews from mainstream publications, this release received an average score of 84, based on 4 reviews.

== Track listing ==
Am I British Yet? track listing
No.	Title	Length
1.	"Break of the Night"	3:32
2.	"Marginalised"	3:12
3.	"I Will Always Be Black"	1:42
4.	"Black British"	4:18
5.	"Let Us Remember By"	2:35
6.	"Philosophy"	4:03
7.	"Am I British Yet?"	2:28
8.	"No Fear" (featuring Liam Bailey)	4:22
9.	"Generations"	1:02
10.	"Twisted"	6:00
11.	"Go Back"	1:00
12.	"Feel So Alive"	3:36
13.	"Jamaica"	4:40
14.	"History"	5:03
15.	"Inhale"	3:42
16.	"Swallowing My Pride"	4:22
17.	"Mission"	3:18
18.	"Be It"	5:05
Total length:		64:00
