= Lollipops & Politics =

Studio album by V V Brown
- Released: Unreleased
- Recorded: 2010–11
- Label: Capitol Records

V V Brown chronology
Travelling Like the Light (2009)	Lollipops & Politics (Unreleased)	Samson & Delilah (2013)

Singles from Lollipops and Politics
- 1. "Children" Released: 20 September 2011

Lollipops & Politics was to be the second studio album by British recording artist V V Brown, initially planned to be released in February 2012. It was to include her single "Children" which was performed with Chiddy. When Brown previewed the album for Santa Monica's KCRW, her new songs were met with positive criticism by Todd Martens of the Los Angeles Times.

The title was chosen by V V Brown due to her interest in politics, but still wanted to make an album that was sexy, and combined the two concepts into "Lollipops & Politics".

Lollipops & Politics was originally scheduled for release on 7 February 2012, but on 31 January Brown tweeted that the LP had been delayed until the summer, for unconfirmed reasons. Later, responding to Twitter questions, she said to her fans that the delay was to add a few songs to the track listing upon release. This delay was then later pushed back to 2013. "Famous" was meant to be the 2nd single. She promoted it by previewing and playing the track but due to the hype and swift upheaval of it projected the concept of fame. It was not successful because it left the album under-promoted due to failure of not being released as planned. On 16 November, Brown stated on Facebook that she was not going to be releasing the album and would be releasing a brand new album in 2013 instead. The album leaked in full on 12 September 2015.

== Original track listing ==
The following track listing was released to the Amazon MP3 store prior to the album's initial delay and subsequent cancellation.

No.	Title	Length
1.	"Children" (featuring Chiddy of Chiddy Bang)	3:13
2.	"Famous"	3:42
3.	"Red Balloon"	3:23
4.	"Tough Like Glue"	3:28
5.	"Climbing High"	3:46
6.	"Heartbeat"	3:44
7.	"Be Yours"	4:12
8.	"10 Ft. Tall"	3:56
9.	"Circus Town"	4:22
10.	"Like Fire"	6:25
Total length:		40:31
