= Leave! =

Single by V V Brown

from the album Travelling Like the Light
- Released: 2 March 2009
- Genre: Indie pop, soul
- Length: 3:48
- Label: Island
- Songwriter(s): Geeki (V V Brown)

V V Brown singles chronology
"Crying Blood" (2008)	"Leave!" (2009)	"Shark in the Water" (2009)

"Leave!" is a song by English recording artist V V Brown from her debut studio album Travelling Like the Light. It was released on 2 March 2009 as the album's second single and was accompanied by a music video. This single, like her debut single "Crying Blood" failed to reach the charts.

== Critical reception ==
Digital Spy gave the song 4 out of 5 stars; they said this about the song "The song itself, which mixes girl group pop with Ronson-esque beats and a hint of new wave, is just as direct as her message, but a whole lot easier to swallow. Thank heavens she chose to sweeten the pill!". The review was mostly positive. It was also the first song by VV Brown to be reviewed on digitalspy because for some reason "Crying Blood" wasn't put onto their data base when it was released.

Femalefirst.co.uk also gave the song 4 out of 5 stars. They started the review by comparing her to other successful voices saying "VV Brown is the newest singer to try and make some cash out of a panda that sounds like Amy Winehouse / Duffy / Adele and all credit to her, she does it well. Fair enough, it might not be the most original sound of all time". They ended the review positively by saying "Her funky doo-wap-de-doo-wap sound brings something back to the music industry that seemed to have disappeared many years ago as the like of bubble gum pop came onto the scene. Her no-frills attitude, mixed with the perfect blend of 50’s pop and (at the very end) almost MC-ing sound make VV Brown one to watch in 2009".

== Music video ==
The video starts with Brown standing in front of a box and then the camera circles the box. Then things start to appear inside the box like a pile of clothes, wine glasses, Brown inside a room, a painting, Brown's chin and mouth, a picture of Brown with a man, Brown's head, a telephone, Brown on a bed with a keyboard, a man on a phone, her hands ripping a picture, a vase with a plant inside, a vase with a dead plant inside, a disco ball and a TV. The outside of the box is brown cardboard, but the inside of the box differs each time from pink, blue, red or green. The video was uploaded onto YouTube in January (the first version of the video is not available in the UK). On 6 February 2009 behind-the-scenes footage of the video shoot was released onto YouTube.

== Track listing ==
These are the track listings for the single and EP:

Single:

1. "Leave!"

EP (1)

1. "Leave!" (Radio Edit)
2. "Leave!" (Little Boots Mix)
3. "Leave!" (Style of Eye Vocal Mix)
4. "Leave!" (Style of Eye Mix)
5. "Leave!" (Drumsound & Simon Bassline Dub Mix)
6. "Leave!" (Drumsound & Simon Bassline Vocal Mix)

EP (2)

1. "Leave!"
2. This Charming Man
3. VV Brown reads an extract from Marian Keyes best selling novel "This Charming Man"

== Live performances ==
1. Campsite Sessions (Travelling Like The Light/Leave!)
2. BBC's Sound/Switch (Leave!/interview)
3. The Album Chart Show
