= Plenitude Arena =

Multipurpose indoor arena in Paris, France

- Plenitude Arena in 2018
- Interactive map of Plenitude Arena
- Former names: Arena92 (planning/construction); U Arena (2017–18); Paris La Défense Arena (2018–26)
- Address: 99 Jardins de l'Arche
- Location: La Défense, Nanterre, France
- Coordinates: 48.8958°N 2.2302°E
- Owner: Racing Arena
- Capacity: 30,680 (rugby); 45,000 (concerts)
- Type: Indoor Arena
- Public transit: Gare de la Défense; Nanterre-Préfecture station Nanterre–La Folie station

Construction
- Groundbreaking: 2 December 2013
- Opened: 16 October 2017
- Cost: €360 million
- Architect: Christian de Portzamparc
- Project manager: SNC-Lavalin
- Structural engineer: RFR Engineers
- Services engineer: Fondasol
- General contractor: GTM Bâtiment

Tenants
- Racing 92 (2017–present); France rugby union team selected matches

Website
- Official website
- Building details

Design and construction
- Other designers: Structures Ile-de-France; Light It Be; CSD Faces; LMV World; Smulders; Artelia; Ateloer; Avel Acoustique; Ducks Scéno
- Quantity surveyor: Vanguard

Plenitude Arena is a multipurpose indoor arena in Nanterre, a western suburb of Paris, France. Opened in October 2017, it was developed by the rugby union club Racing 92, and replaced Stade Olympique Yves-du-Manoir as their home. It is Europe's largest indoor arena. Its naming rights are held by Eni Plenitude, an Italian energy company.

The venue offers three separate configurations. In its rugby configuration, it has a nominal seating capacity of 30,681. For concerts, the original capacity was 40,000, but it was upgraded to 45,000 in 2024. Finally, a movable stand allows it also to be used for a variety of indoor sports, at various capacities, with a capacity of as low as 5,000 being possible. The venue also includes 33,000 square metres (360,000 sq ft) of office space, 300 student rooms, and shops, including a club shop, a brewery, and a gourmet restaurant.

It hosted swimming and water polo events at the 2024 Summer Olympics and swimming at the 2024 Summer Paralympics.

It will host the final phase of the 2031 FIBA Basketball World Cup.

== History ==
View of Plenitude Arena in Nanterre, seen from the Grande Arche in La Défense

The arena was originally planned to open in 2014. That date was delayed due to local protests. The venue was initially planned to have a retractable roof, but it was ultimately built with a fixed roof instead.

Upon its completion, it became the largest indoor arena in Europe, surpassing the Olympic Stadium in Moscow, which held this title since 1980. It eventually opened in October 2017, although Racing 92 played their first home game in the new arena when they hosted Toulouse on 22 December 2017. The arena's working name was changed from "Arena92" to "U Arena"; alluding to the configuration of the main stands, and the structure's shape, when viewed from the air, in November 2016. The name was changed a second time to the current Paris La Défense Arena on 12 June 2018. This followed a 10-year naming rights agreement with Paris La Défense. This company manages the nearby La Défense business district. Starting 1 July 2026, the arena is named Plenitude Arena after Eni Plenitude bought the naming rights.

The Rolling Stones were the first band ever to perform a concert at the venue, closing their Europe-only No Filter Tour, with three shows, on 19, 22, and 25 October 2017. The arena's first rugby union match took place on 25 November 2017 between France and Japan. On 11 March 2018, the French professional basketball clubs Nanterre 92 and ASVEL Basket, played each other in a LNB Pro A 2017–18 season game. The game had 15,220 people in attendance, the highest in the league's history. In 2017, the Paris Supercross moved from Bercy to Nanterre, as the venue could host a more traditional Supercross, compared to an Arenacross configuration. In 2024, ahead of Taylor Swift's four-date stop, as part of The Eras Tour, the capacity was upgraded to 45,000.

The arena hosted WWE Clash in Paris on 31 August, 2025, and the September 1, 2025 edition of WWE Raw.

From October 2025 hosted final Masters 1000 of the year the Paris Masters after AccorHotels Arena from 1986 to 2024.

In January 2026, it was announced that the arena was to be acquired by Live Nation, subject to regulatory approval. In 2026, Canadian singer Celine Dion is scheduled to perform a series of concerts at the arena from 12 September to 17 October as part of her comeback tour. The concert series is scheduled to continue in May 2027.

== Entertainment events ==
Date	Act	Event	Attendance	Gross
2017
19 October	The Rolling Stones	No Filter Tour	109,126 / 109,126	$18,529,324
22 October	The Rolling Stones	No Filter Tour	109,126 / 109,126	$18,529,324
25 October	The Rolling Stones	No Filter Tour	109,126 / 109,126	$18,529,324
2 December	Various Artists	Stars 80	—	—
2018
8 June	Roger Waters	Us + Them Tour	45,639 / 56,540	$4,281,563
9 June	Roger Waters	Us + Them Tour	45,639 / 56,540	$4,281,563
24 August	Kendrick Lamar; N.E.R.D; IAM; Brockhampton	Paris Summer Jam	—	—
13 October	Booba	Booba en Concert	—	—
28 November	Paul McCartney	Freshen Up	36,663 / 36,663	$3,851,577
2019
11 May	Kassav'	Tournée 40e Anniversaire	—	—
7 June	Mylène Farmer	Mylène Farmer 2019	—	—
8 June	Mylène Farmer	Mylène Farmer 2019	—	—
11 June	Mylène Farmer	Mylène Farmer 2019	—	—
12 June	Mylène Farmer	Mylène Farmer 2019	—	—
14 June	Mylène Farmer	Mylène Farmer 2019	—	—
15 June	Mylène Farmer	Mylène Farmer 2019	—	—
18 June	Mylène Farmer	Mylène Farmer 2019	—	—
19 June	Mylène Farmer	Mylène Farmer 2019	—	—
22 June	Mylène Farmer	Mylène Farmer 2019	—	—
28 June	Rammstein	Rammstein Stadium Tour	73,223 / 73,223	$6,660,269
29 June	Rammstein	Rammstein Stadium Tour	73,223 / 73,223	$6,660,269
3 July	P!nk	Beautiful Trauma World Tour	36,295 / 36,295	$3,358,518
21 September	Soprano	Phoenix Tour	—	—
26 October	Bigflo & Oli	Bigflo et Oli en Concert	—	—
6 December	Patrick Bruel	Ce soir on sort... Tour	—	—
2020
22 February	DJ Snake	—	34,396 / 35,794	$1,894,671
2022
16 March	Genesis	The Last Domino? Tour	45,889 / 45,889	$7,215,967
17 March	Genesis	The Last Domino? Tour	45,889 / 45,889	$7,215,967
11 June	Elton John	Farewell Yellow Brick Road	62,220 / 62,220	$9,846,099
12 June	Elton John	Farewell Yellow Brick Road	62,220 / 62,220	$9,846,099
26 June	Iron Maiden	Legacy of the Beast World Tour	36,018/ 36,018	$2,895,243
2 July	Green Day; Fall Out Boy; Weezer	Hella Mega Tour	33,446 / 33,446	$2,634,265
10 September	Ninho	Jefe Tour	—	—
2 December	Angèle	Nonante-Cinq Tour	—	—
3 December	Angèle	Nonante-Cinq Tour	—	—
8 December	Orelsan	Civilisation Tour	—	—
2023
8 April	Music Bank Paris	—N/a	—	—
13 May	Bruce Springsteen & The E Street Band	2023 Tour	74,001 / 74,001	$8,320,174
15 May	Bruce Springsteen & The E Street Band	2023 Tour	74,001 / 74,001	$8,320,174
20 May	Burna Boy	Love damini Tour	36,585 / 36,585	$2,863,340
10 June	M. Pokora	Épicentre Tour	25,000	—
21 June	P!nk	Summer Carnival	79,996 / 79,996	$8,144,381
22 June	P!nk	Summer Carnival	79,996 / 79,996	$8,144,381
22 August	Imagine Dragons	Mercury World Tour	80,628 / 80,711	$7,664,786
23 August	Imagine Dragons	Mercury World Tour	80,628 / 80,711	$7,664,786
16 September	Karmine Corp	KCX3	—	—
3 November	50 Cent	The Final Lap Tour	30,792 / 34,750	$2,447,385
25 November	Fally Ipupa	—	—	—
2 December	Stromae	Multitude Tour	—	—
3 December	Stromae	Multitude Tour	—	—
8 December	Bigflo & Oli	Le Grand Tour	—	—
2024
13 January	Jay Chou	Carnival World Tour	—	—
9 March	Calogero	A.M.O.U.R Tour	—	—
16 March	Michel Sardou	Je me Souviens d'un Adieu	—	—
17 March	Michel Sardou	Je me Souviens d'un Adieu	—	—
6 April	Joe Hisaishi	Joe Hisaishi Symphonic Concert	—	—
7 April	Joe Hisaishi	Joe Hisaishi Symphonic Concert	—	—
20 April	Black Eyed Peas	Elevation World Tour	—	—
9 May	Taylor Swift	The Eras Tour	180,000 / 180,000	—
10 May	Taylor Swift	The Eras Tour	180,000 / 180,000	—
11 May	Taylor Swift	The Eras Tour	180,000 / 180,000	—
12 May	Taylor Swift	The Eras Tour	180,000 / 180,000	—
3 November	Linkin Park	From Zero World Tour	39,255 / 39,255	$4,529,465
23 November	Sum 41	Tour of the Setting Sum	42,264 / 42,264	$2,649,018
30 November	Tayc	—	—	—
1 December	Tayc	—	—	—
4 December	Paul McCartney	Got Back	85,265 / 85,265	$8,953,545
5 December	Paul McCartney	Got Back	85,265 / 85,265	$8,953,545
14 December	Gims	Le Dernier Tour	24,887 / 27,000	$1,216,148
2025
11 January	Kaaris	—	31,640 / 33,000	$1,887,320
8 February	Sidiki Diabaté	—	—	—
22 February	Ateez	Towards the Light: Will to Power	29,225 / 29,225	$4,345,691
22 March	JJ Lin	JJ20 Final Lap World Tour	12,068 / 15,000	$2,985,809
29 March	Lenny Kravitz	Blue Electric Light Tour	36,137 / 36,137	$3,741,216
18 April	Gazo	—	34,431 / 38,000	$1,891,237
26 April	Ferre Gola	—	—	—
23 May	Dua Lipa	Radical Optimism Tour	85,967 / 85,967	9,0236,555
24 May	Dua Lipa	Radical Optimism Tour	85,967 / 85,967	9,0236,555
14 June	Kings League	Kings World Cup Clubs Final	—	—
21 June	Ludovico Einaudi	The Summer Portraits Tour	25,365 / 27,000	$3,018,650
2 July	Robbie Williams	Britpop Tour	30,772 / 32,000	$3,658,609
5 July	Chris Brown	Breezy Bowl XX Tour	41,112 / 41,112	$4,145,402
15 July	Kendrick Lamar; SZA	Grand National Tour	67,432 / 75,925	$10,898,478
16 July	Kendrick Lamar; SZA	Grand National Tour	67,432 / 75,925	$10,898,478
19 July	Iron Maiden	Run for Your Lives World Tour	75,463 / 75,463	$7,662,187
20 July	Iron Maiden	Run for Your Lives World Tour	75,463 / 75,463	$7,662,187
31 August	WWE	WWE Clash in Paris	30,343	—
1 September	WWE	WWE Raw	—	—
3 September	Post Malone Jelly Roll	Big Ass Stadium Tour	28,545 / 28,545	$2,504,489
20 September	G-Dragon	Übermensch World Tour	—	—
8 November	The Offspring	Supercharged Worldwide in '25	—	—
21 November	Hans Zimmer	The Next Level	—	—
5 December	Hamza	—	—	—
13 December	Jean-Louis Aubert	—	—	—
2026
22 May	Rocket League Championship Series	RLCS Paris Major 2026	—	—
23 May	Rocket League Championship Series	RLCS Paris Major 2026	—	—
24 May	Rocket League Championship Series	RLCS Paris Major 2026	—	—
19 June	Foo Fighters	Take Cover Tour	—	—
22 June	Iron Maiden	Run for Your Lives World Tour	—	—
26 June	Call of Duty League	2026 CDL Major IV	—	—
27 June	Call of Duty League	2026 CDL Major IV	—	—
28 June	Call of Duty League	2026 CDL Major IV	—	—
4 July	Bad Bunny	Debí Tirar Más Fotos World Tour	—	—
5 July	Bad Bunny	Debí Tirar Más Fotos World Tour	—	—
12 September	Celine Dion	Celine Dion Paris 2026–2027	—	—
16 September	Celine Dion	Celine Dion Paris 2026–2027	—	—
18 September	Celine Dion	Celine Dion Paris 2026–2027	—	—
19 September	Celine Dion	Celine Dion Paris 2026–2027	—	—
23 September	Celine Dion	Celine Dion Paris 2026–2027	—	—
25 September	Celine Dion	Celine Dion Paris 2026–2027	—	—
26 September	Celine Dion	Celine Dion Paris 2026–2027	—	—
30 September	Celine Dion	Celine Dion Paris 2026–2027	—	—
2 October	Celine Dion	Celine Dion Paris 2026–2027	—	—
3 October	Celine Dion	Celine Dion Paris 2026–2027	—	—
7 October	Celine Dion	Celine Dion Paris 2026–2027	—	—
9 October	Celine Dion	Celine Dion Paris 2026–2027	—	—
10 October	Celine Dion	Celine Dion Paris 2026–2027	—	—
14 October	Celine Dion	Celine Dion Paris 2026–2027	—	—
16 October	Celine Dion	Celine Dion Paris 2026–2027	—	—
17 October	Celine Dion	Celine Dion Paris 2026–2027	—	—
2027
19 February	Rush	Fifty Something Tour	—	—
23 April	Olivia Rodrigo	The Unraveled Tour	—	—
23 April	Olivia Rodrigo	The Unraveled Tour	—	—
8 May	Celine Dion	Celine Dion Paris 2026–2027	—	—
12 May	Celine Dion	Celine Dion Paris 2026–2027	—	—
14 May	Celine Dion	Celine Dion Paris 2026–2027	—	—
15 May	Celine Dion	Celine Dion Paris 2026–2027	—	—
19 May	Celine Dion	Celine Dion Paris 2026–2027	—	—
21 May	Celine Dion	Celine Dion Paris 2026–2027	—	—
22 May	Celine Dion	Celine Dion Paris 2026–2027	—	—
26 May	Celine Dion	Celine Dion Paris 2026–2027	—	—
28 May	Celine Dion	Celine Dion Paris 2026–2027	—	—
29 May	Celine Dion	Celine Dion Paris 2026–2027	—	—
15 June	blink-182	—	—	—
1 July	Karol G	Viajando Por El Mundo Tropitour	—	—
9 July	Stray Kids	Run It World Tour	—	—

== Gallery ==
Plenitude Arena daylight

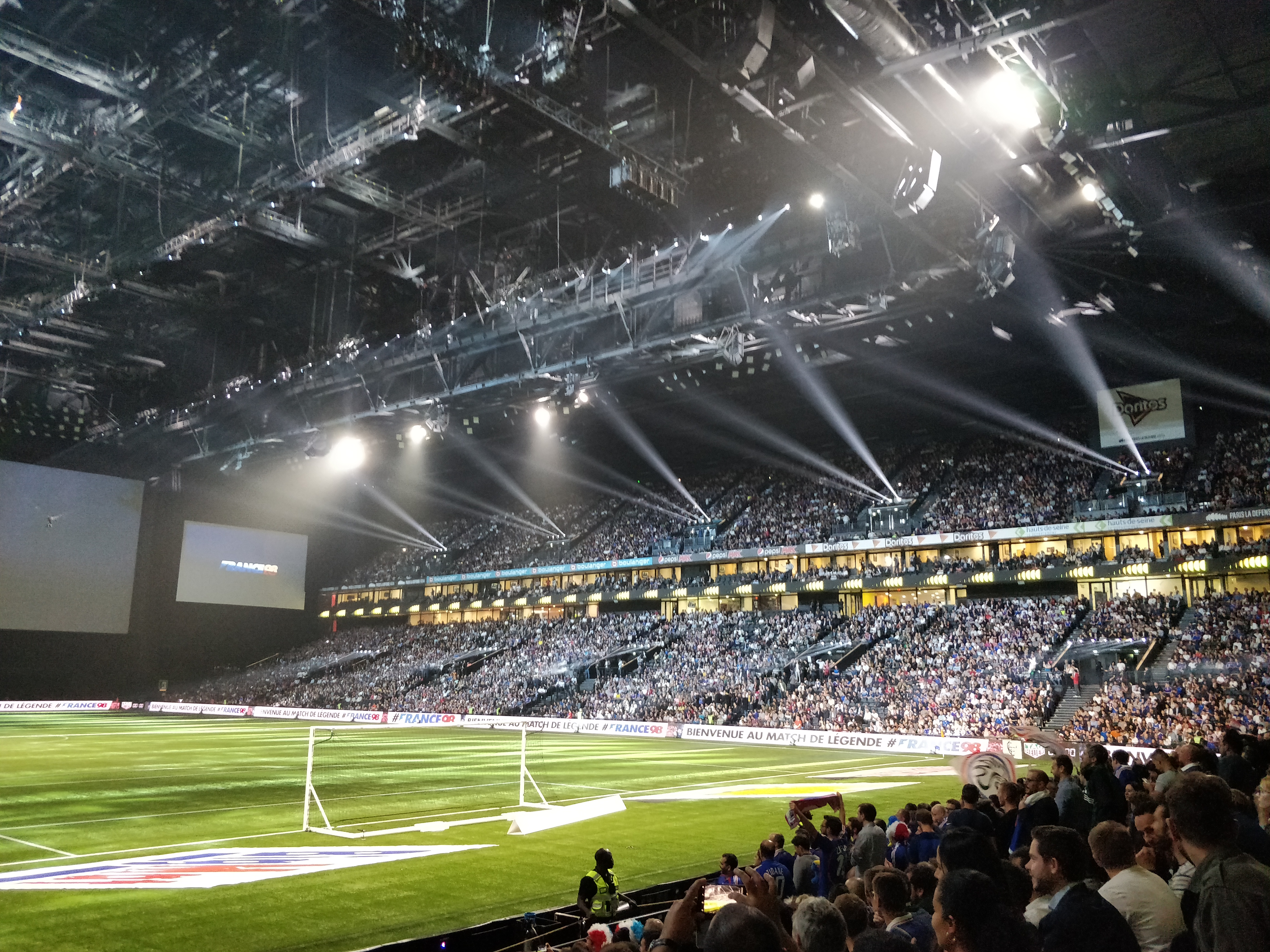
Plenitude Arena interior

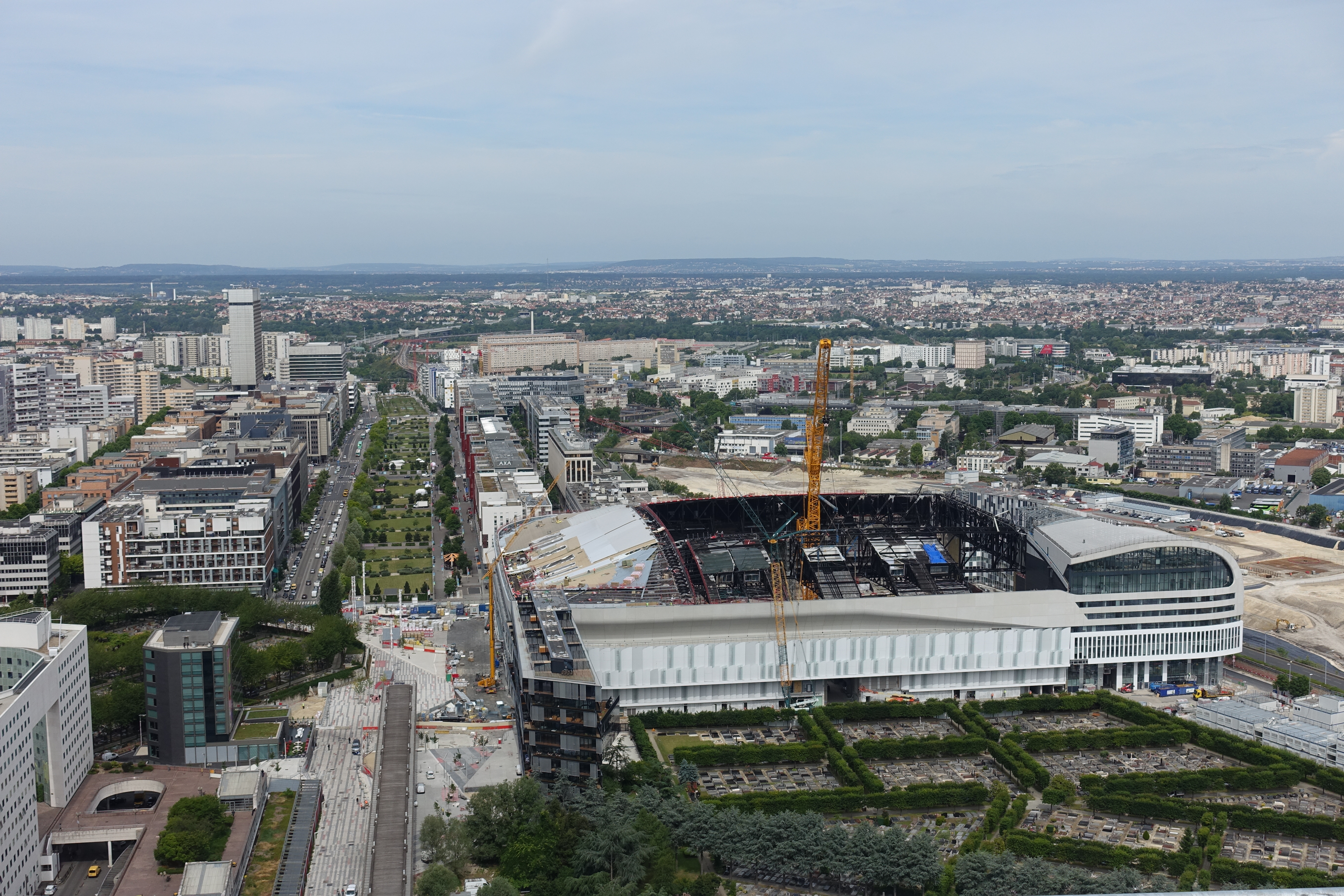
Plenitude Arena under construction

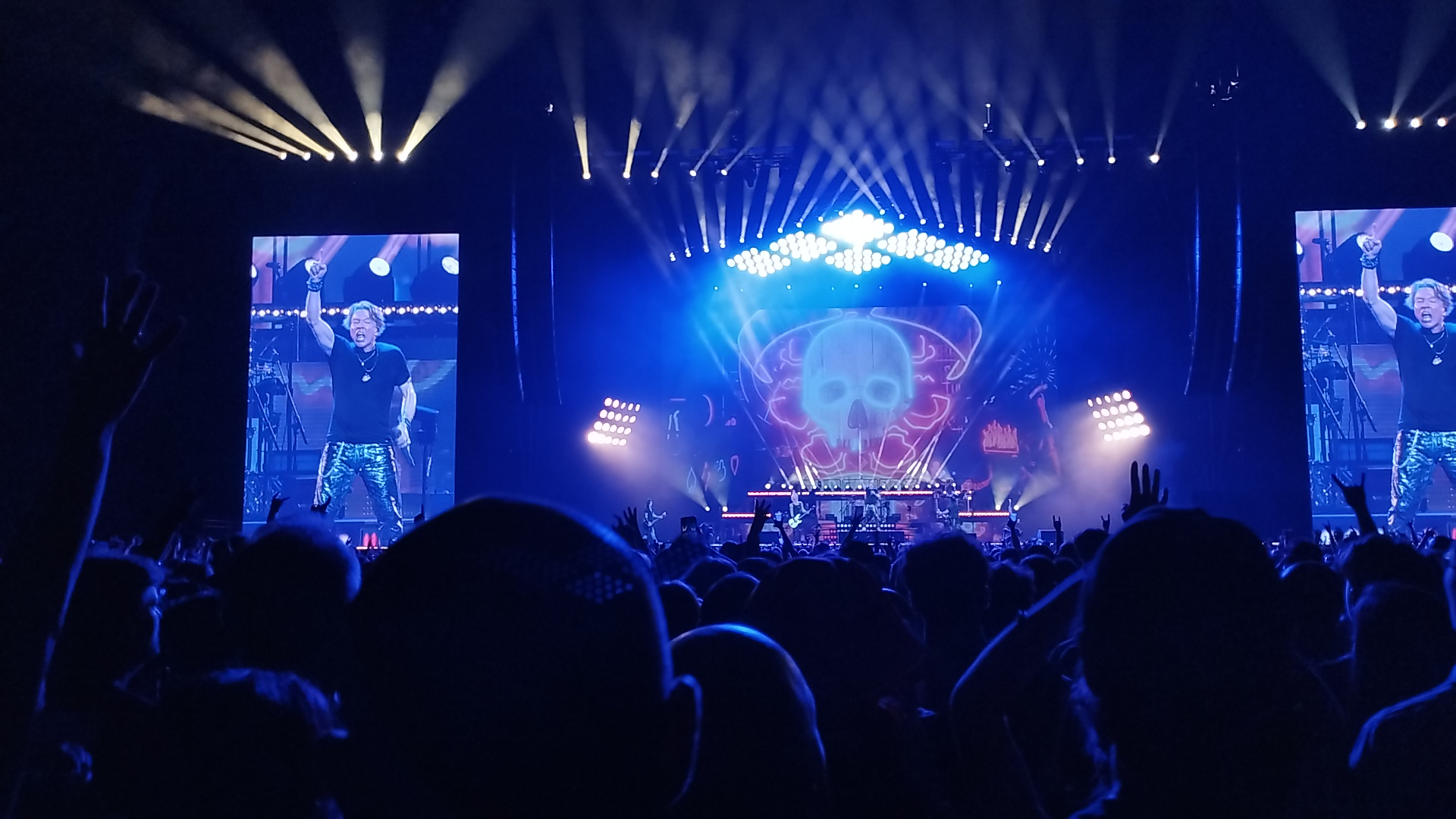
Guns N' Roses concert, 13 July 2023

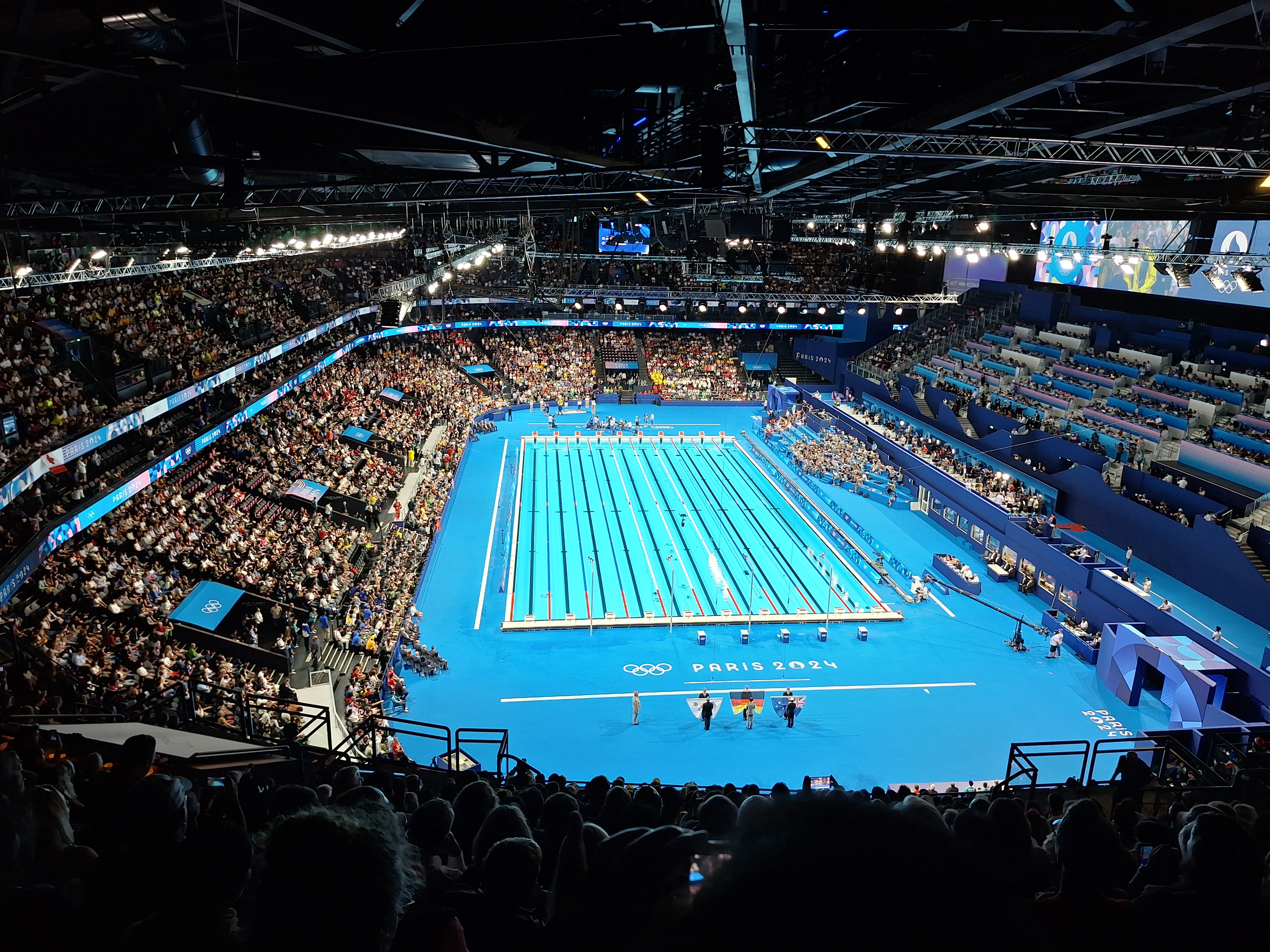
Inside Plenitude Arena during the 2024 Summer Olympics

== See also ==
- List of indoor arenas in France

Preceded by Lusail Sports Arena; Lusail	FIBA World Cup; Final venue 2031	Succeeded by TBD; TBD
