= Crying Blood =

Single by V V Brown

from the album Travelling Like the Light
- Released: 3 November 2008
- Genre: Power pop
- Length: 2:31
- Label: Island
- Songwriter: Geeki (VV Brown)

V V Brown singles chronology
"Crying Blood" (2008)	"Leave!" (2009)

Music video
- "Crying Blood" on YouTube

"Crying Blood" is the debut single by singer V V Brown (also known by her writing alias Geeki). It was released on 3 November 2008 and was accompanied by a music video. The song did not chart as it was not eligible to do so. It was issued as a limited release digital download and 7-inch vinyl. Brown wrote this song after finishing with her "mean" American boyfriend and returning to England. Despite its lyrical woe, the melody is upbeat. She explained to Q magazine: "That was an accident, actually. I simply wanted to give the impression, musically, that I was over him. It's true he was terribly mean, but ultimately I'm an optimistic sort." This song is also featured on Just Dance 2 as a downloadable song. "Crying Blood" was the opening title song to the movie Lesbian Vampire Killers starring Mathew Horne and James Corden

== Critical reception ==
MusicOMH.com gave the song a very positive review by saying "Crying Blood explodes out of the speakers like a hyperactive child in a Sunny D factory, all OTT vocals and perfectly pitched desperation", they then went on to talk about what Brown calls doo-wop indie and then said "there’s a definite '60s vibe what with all the cute backing vocals".

clickmusic.com gave the song 3 stars out of 5. The review starts positively: "imagine Mousse T singing 'The Monster Mash' – that's the sound of VV Brown's debut offering 'Crying Blood'. It's pacey and she does have an effortlessly good voice, but the song does borrow heavily from 60s rock 'n' roll sounds".

== Music video ==
Brown dancing with others (three are her)

The video was released onto YouTube on 16 September 2008. The video starts off with Brown walking out of the dark and pressing a button on her keyboard. She then starts dancing and singing inside the new white background, then she presses the button again and changes it to multi colour. It changes colour multiple times in the video, green, blue, yellow, pink, orange etc. Then when it comes up to the first minute Brown's band and also a dog are seen. Then ordinary people start to dance together whilst VV sings. Then, like the game, Tetris pieces start to fall from the sky to create some stairs for Brown which she then climbs up and down. Then it turns into a cartoon with sketched version of Brown and her band. Then she turns back to normal and later there appears to be more than one of her dancing around on the screen. Then Brown presses another key on her keyboard and it turns into a video game; once she has completed that level it turns back to normal. Then Brown leads the gang (three of them are her) in a new dance. One of them walks off to the keyboard and presses a key.

== Track listing ==
These are the track listings for the single and EP:

Single:

1. "Crying Blood"

EP

1. "Crying Blood"
2. Andrew Weatherall Remix
3. Andrew Weatherall Dub
4. Moody Boyz Front Line Re-Rub
5. Moody Boyz Front Line Dub
6. Hannah Holland Remix

== Live performances ==
1. Sunday Night Project
2. T4
3. Later With Jools Holland (Crying Blood/Bottles)
