= Mélissa Nkonda =

French singer

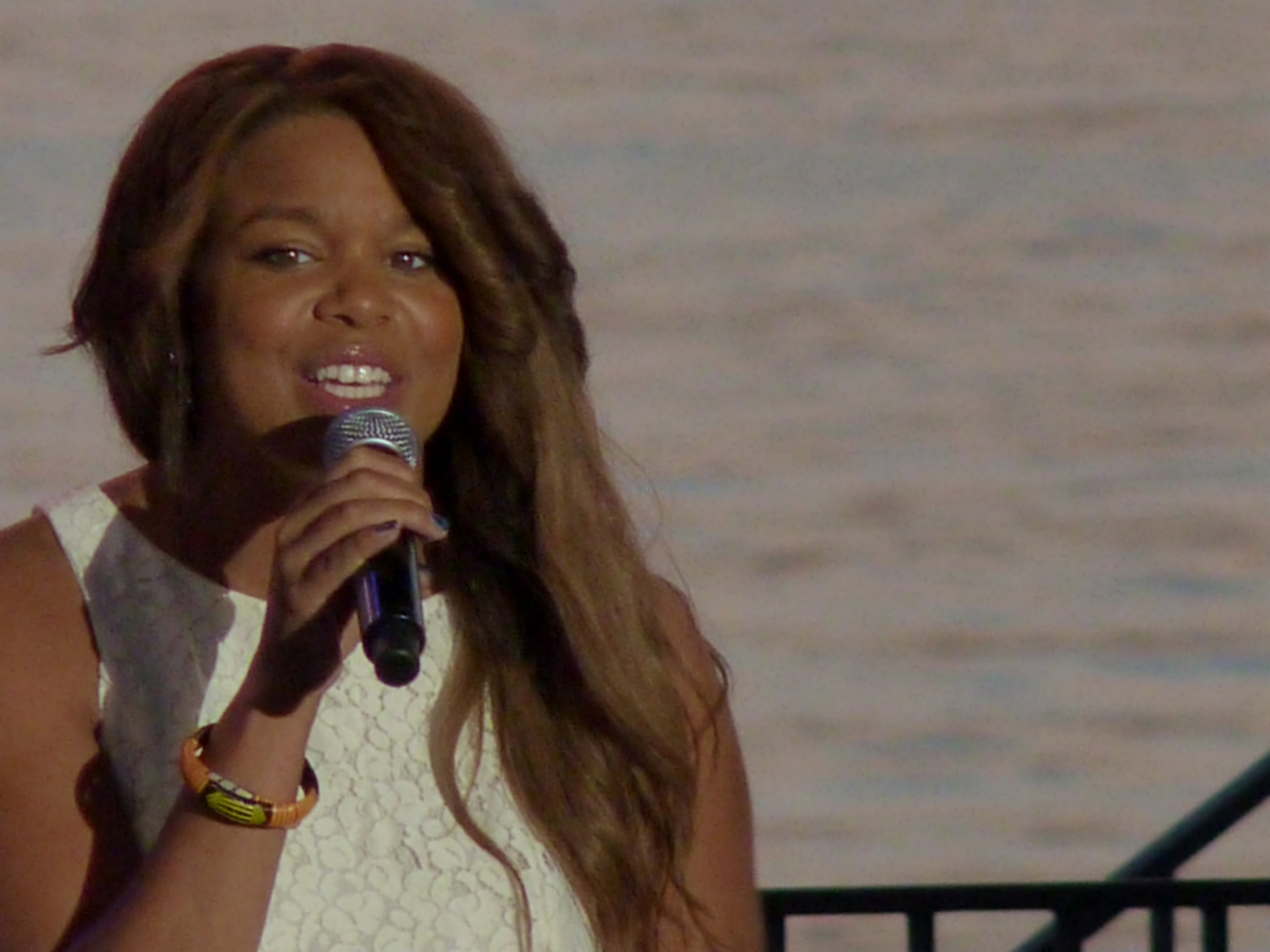
- Mélissa Nkonda

Background information
- Born: Mélissa Nkonda; November 6, 1990 (age 35); Saint-Saulve, Nord, France
- Genres: Pop; Contemporary R&B; Soul; Blues
- Occupation: Singer
- Label: AZ (Universal Music Group)
- Website: melissankonda.com

Mélissa Nkonda (born November 6, 1990, in Saint-Saulve, Nord, France), is a French singer.

She is known for having participated in season 7 of the French reality show Nouvelle Star in 2009. In 2010, she won a contest called Je veux signer chez AZ (I want to sign with AZ), organized by the French record label AZ. It was at the end of the contest that she signed a contract with that label.

== Career ==
Mélissa is the daughter of an Algerian mother and a Cameroonian father.

In 2008, Mélissa's mother signed her up for the casting of the 7th season of the reality TV show Nouvelle Star, which was broadcast from March to June 2009. After having gone up to the prime, Mélissa Nkonda was eliminated at the end of the third prime, she regret that it had to do with "infernal machinery," where "there wasn't any opportunity for improvisation, everything is planned right up to the nail polish." She then admitted "the happiest day of my life was when I went home." At the end, she said there was "nothing positive" about it, explaining that it's just a show that "only serve to crush artists in public."

Her first album, Nouveaux Horizons, allowed her to work most notably with French rapper Soprano, whom she would be part of a duo with (remix by Nouveaux Horizons), V V Brown, and RedOne. Her first single, also called Nouveaux Horizons, was successful since its release. It's one of the most played singles on radio and TV since the summer of 2011.

In July 2011, she released her second single J'ai fait tout ça pour vous with V V Brown.

In October 2011, following a remake of her album Nouveaux Horizons she released her single Africa.

In April 2012, she did a duo with American singer Andy Grammer with the song Keep Your Head Up (French title: Relève la tête).

== Discography ==
=== Albums ===
Year	Album	Chart position		
Year	Album	FR	BE	CH
2011	Nouveaux Horizons	39	3	12

=== Singles ===
Year	Songs	Chart positions		
Year	Songs	FR	BE	CH
2011	"Nouveaux Horizons"	20	1	27
2011	"J'ai fait tout ça pour vous" (feat. V V Brown)	86	65	5
2011	"Africa'	-	-	-
2012	"Keep Your Head Up (Relève la tête)' (feat. Andy Grammer)	156	-	-
