= Travelling Like the Light =

Studio album by V V Brown
- Released: 13 July 2009
- Recorded: 2008–2009
- Genres: Indie pop; dance-punk; soul; rock and roll
- Length: 40:20
- Label: Island
- Producers: V V Brown, Steve Dub, Jeremy Wheatley

V V Brown chronology
| Travelling Like the Light (2009) | Lollipops & Politics (Unreleased) |

Singles from Travelling Like the Light
- 1. "Crying Blood" Released: 3 November 2008; 2. "Leave!" Released: 2 March 2009; 3. "Shark in the Water" Released: 6 July 2009; 4. "Game Over" Released: 12 October 2009

Travelling Like the Light is the debut studio album by English musician V V Brown, released on 13 July 2009 by Island Records. Initially released in the United Kingdom, the album was digitally released in the United States on 2 February 2010 and was physically released on 20 April 2010. Brown was inspired by an unsuccessful romantic relationship when writing most of the album. Despite some mixed criticism towards its eclectic musical style, the album received generally positive reviews from most music critics.

== Background ==
Brown wrote the music and plays instruments on the album. It was inspired by 1950s music and electronic music, as well as synthesizer sounds emitted from Game Boy and Nintendo. Most of the lyrics on the album (such as those from the singles: "Crying Blood," "Leave!" and "Shark In the Water") are about a failed affair Brown endured.

== Release and promotion ==
The album's release was preceded by a limited non-chart eligible release of "Crying Blood" on 7" vinyl and digital download. Travelling Like the Light was released 13 July 2009 on Island Records in the United Kingdom. Its United States release on 2 February 2010 coincided with the release of "Shark in the Water" as Free Single of the Week on iTunes. On 5 December 2008, she was nominated for the BBC's Sound of 2009 award, alongside acts including Little Boots and Lady Gaga.

=== Singles ===
- "Crying Blood" was released as Brown's debut single for digital download and CD single on 3 November 2008. Brown performed "Crying Blood" and a new song, "Bottles", on the first episode of the 33rd series of the BBC's Later... with Jools Holland. She was the musical guest on The Sunday Night Project on 11 January 2009 and performed "Crying Blood", as well as short extracts from other of her own songs throughout the show.
- "Leave!" was released as the second single on 2 March 2009.
- "Shark in the Water" is the third single from the album. It has been described by popjustice as "immediately brilliant – a reinterpretation rather than a continuation of the 'indie doo wop' schtick she's been working on over the last couple of singles and therefore a lot less stylised and a great deal more accessible." The video is available on YouTube and iTunes and has been described as the sort of video that only a major label could make. "Shark in the Water" went on to sell 500,000 singles in the U.S during the course of her promotion in 2010.
- "Game Over" is the fourth single released from the album. Summary by Jamie Smith: "It's bold and brash, somehow modern yet retro-styled, but more than anything, it makes you want to dance, and that's what pop music is all about."

== Reception ==
Professional ratings
Aggregate scores
| Source | Rating |
|---|---|
| Metacritic | 67/100 |
Review scores
| Source | Rating |
| AllMusic | 4/5 stars |
| Entertainment Weekly | (B+) |
| The Guardian | 4/5 stars |
| Los Angeles Times | 3/4 stars |
| NME | (3/10) |
| The Observer | (mixed) |
| PopMatters | (5/10) |
| Rolling Stone | 3.5/5 stars |
| Slant Magazine | 3.5/5 stars |
| The Times | 3/5 stars |

Upon its release, the album received generally positive reviews from most music critics, based on an aggregate score of 67/100 from Metacritic. The Guardian writer Caroline Sullivan gave it 4 out of 5 stars and viewed Brown's effervescence as a strength, writing "She nimbly skips from 60s girl-group romping (Quick Fix) to Sandie Shaw-inspired melodrama to pumped-up powerpop to rockabilly and sounds entirely assured all the way through". BBC Online's Al Fox called it "an eclectic yet uniform collection of songs" and wrote that it "boasts a rare kind of head-turning indie-pop magnificence". John Meagher of The Belfast Telegraph gave the album 4 out of 5 stars and wrote favorably of Brown's singing. MusicOMH writer Michael Cragg gave it 3½ out of 5 stars and called Brown's voice "a versatile instrument that she utilizes to brilliant effect throughout". Entertainment Weekly's Leah Greenblatt gave Travelling Like the Light a B+ rating and commended Brown for her musical balance of modern and vintage sound. Dan Aquilante of The New York Post called the album "eclectic" and praised Brown's musical approach. Q magazine gave the album 4 out of 5 stars and praised Brown's performance, called her "a force of nature". Metro's Ben East gave it 4 out of 5 stars and found Brown's style refreshing, calling it "an interesting confection with pleasingly dark lyrics". Spin critic Barry Walters praised Brown for her "guts" and "grace", writing that her "enthusiasm immediately leaps from the grooves, but this debut also reveals an emotional and musical range her neo-retro peers lack". Pete Paphides of The Times called it an "early promise".

In contrast, NME's Sam Richards perceived Brown's songwriting as lacking in substance and panned the album's assorted musical elements, stating "unless you're hyped up on a cocktail of Sunny D and Haribo yourself, you'll find most of this album very annoying indeed". Sunday Herald writer Edd McCracken found it "light on lyrics" and called it "a lukewarm, plastic pop concoction". The Observer expressed a mixed response towards its offbeat sound, describing it as "not straight to the scrapheap but kooky la-la land". The Observer's Alice Fisher commended Brown's vocal performance and perceived "glimmers of greatness", but ultimately viewed the album as "a great idea that turns out to be a bit wearisome in practice". PopMatters writer David Smith gave the album a 5/10 rating and viewed a considerable amount of it as "filler", calling it "an obstacle course of an album, but the high points are worth it". Neil McCormick of The Daily Telegraph gave it 3 out of 5 stars and described its music as "a hugely colourful novelty exuberance". The Independent writer Andy Gill gave the album 3 out of 5 stars and expressed a mixed response towards Brown's eclectic style, but ultimately found her as "a refreshing alternative to run of production-line soul divas". Yahoo! Music's Alex Denney gave Travelling Like the Light a 7/10 rating and called it "a bracing and big-hearted mix of rockabilly, doo-wop, pop and contemporary R&B in which Brown sparkles throughout". Rolling Stone writer Jody Rosen described it as "old-school party music that seems right at home in 2010" and wrote that "her music floats exhilaratingly outside of time".

Despite writing that "Brown is more conduit than innovator", The A.V. Club's Genevieve Koski gave Travelling Like the Light a B− rating and wrote that she "capably wields the well-honed retro-pop sound". Slant Magazine's Jonathan Keefe gave the album 3½ out of 5 stars and commended Brown for her unconventional "creativity" and singing, stating "Brown brings that same sense of fearlessness to her vocal performances". Allmusic writer Andy Kellman gave it 4 out of 5 stars and described it as "genuine, natural, and deep as mishmash throwback pop can get", while comparing her musical style to "being the child of Kirsty MacColl and the sibling of Jazmine Sullivan, messing with pop traditions as she courts and reprimands with a large, youthful voice that positively dances". Digital Spy's Nick Levine gave it 4 out of 5 stars and wrote that the album "paints Brown as a talented songwriter, an inventive producer and a singer capable of everything from playful shrieks to hushed, soulful intimacy". USA Today's Elysa Gardner gave the album 3½ out of 4 stars and wrote that it "reveals both a knack for killer hooks and, vocally, a rare mix of power and grace". Los Angeles Times writer Mikael Wood gave the album 3 out of 4 stars and viewed its slower songs as undistinctive, but wrote "even when her material blands out, there's a fresh-faced charm to Brown's delivery that sets her apart from the vintage-vinyl pack. She's the rare retro-soulster unafraid to act her age".

== Track listing ==
Travelling Like the Light track listing
| No. | Title | Writer(s) | Producer(s) | Length |
|---|---|---|---|---|
| 1. | "Quick Fix" | V V Brown | Brown; Steve Dub; Segs | 2:48 |
| 2. | "Game Over" | Brown; Roy Kerr; Anu Pillai | Kid Gloves | 3:16 |
| 3. | "Shark in the Water" | Marcus Sepehrmanesh; Tommy Tysper | Tysper & Mack | 3:04 |
| 4. | "Leave!" | Brown | Brown; Dub; Segs | 3:48 |
| 5. | "Bottles" | Brown; George Astasio; Tim Larcombe | Brown; Dub; Segs | 3:01 |
| 6. | "Crying Blood" | Brown | Brown; Dub; Segs | 2:31 |
| 7. | "Back in Time" | Brown | Brown; Dub; Segs | 4:11 |
| 8. | "I Love You" | Brown | Brown; Dub; Segs | 3:53 |
| 9. | "L.O.V.E" | Brown | Brown; Dub; Segs | 2:57 |
| 10. | "Everybody" | Brown | Brown; Dub; Segs | 2:58 |
| 11. | "Crazy Amazing" | Brown; Adam Midgley; Jamie Reddington | Brown; Dub; Segs | 3:06 |
| 12. | "Travelling Like the Light" | Brown | Brown; Dub; Segs | 3:47 |

iTunes bonus tracks
| No. | Title | Writer(s) | Producer(s) | Length |
|---|---|---|---|---|
| 13. | "Video Killed the Radio Star" | Geoff Downes; Trevor Horn; Bruce Woolley | Brown; Dub; Segs | 3:26 |
| 14. | "Shark In the Water" (music video) | | | 3:13 |
| 15. | "Leave!" (music video) | | | 3:35 |
| 16. | "Crying Blood" (music video) | | | 2:47 |

French re-release bonus track
| No. | Title | Writer(s) | Producer(s) | Length |
|---|---|---|---|---|
| 13. | "No Bonsoir" | Brown | Brown; Dub; Segs | 3:02 |

== Personnel ==
Credits for Travelling Like the Light adapted from Allmusic.

- Lorenzo Agius – cover photo
- James Banbury – string arrangements
- V V Brown – performer, producer
- Mike Crossey – mixing
- Steve Dub – producer, mixing
- Richard Edgeler – assistant
- Mark Aaron James – design
- Alexis Smith – programming
- Jeremy Wheatley – producer, mixing

== Charts ==
Weekly chart performance for Travelling Like the Light
| Chart (2008) | Peak position |
|---|---|
| French Albums (SNEP) | 16 |
| UK Albums (Official Charts) | 30 |
| US Billboard 200 | 179 |
