= Nicolas Peyrac =

French musician, writer and photographer (born 1949)

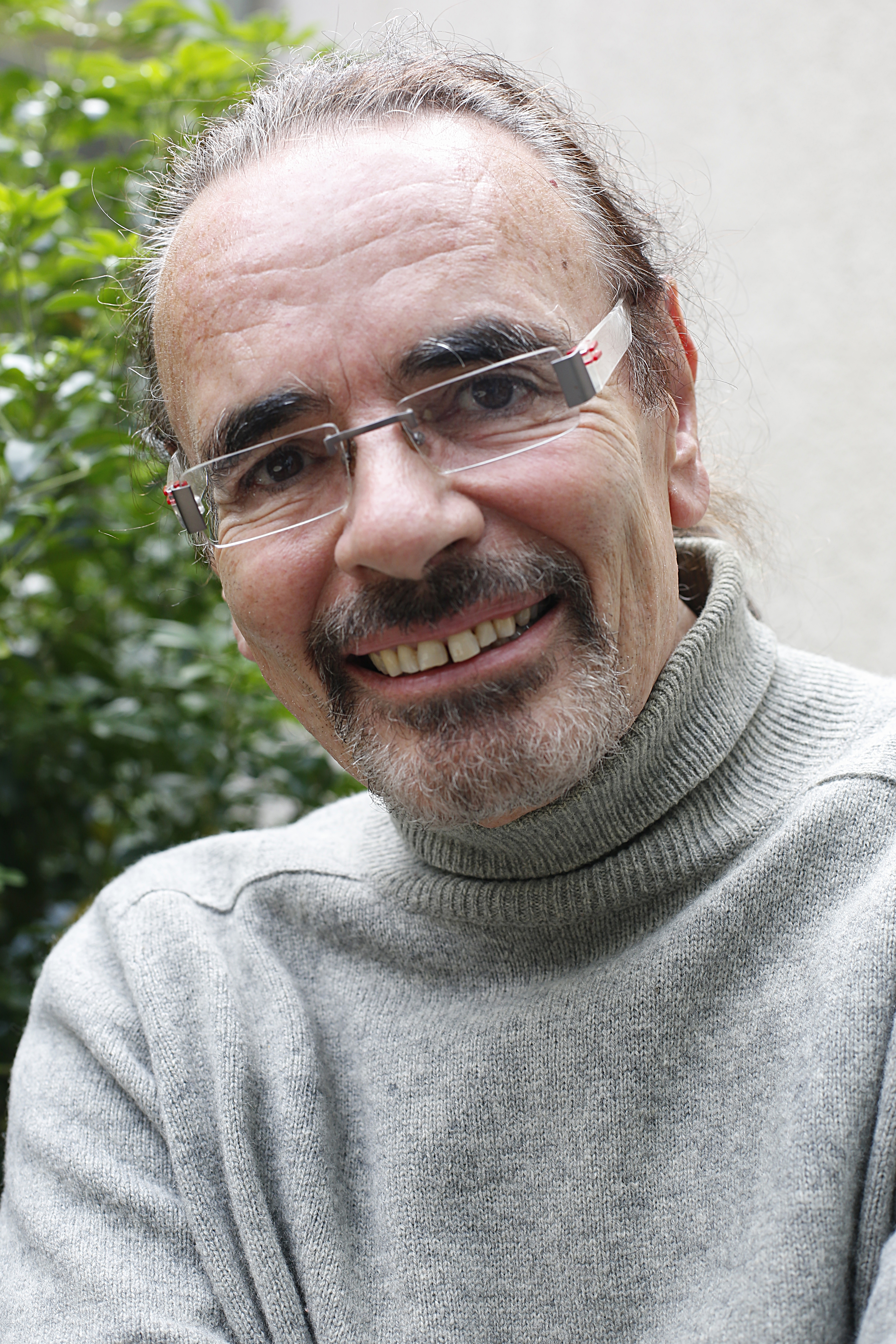
Nicolas Peyrac in Rennes (October 2013)

Nicolas Peyrac (born 6 October 1949 in Rennes as Jean-Jacques Tazartez) is a French musician, writer and photographer.

== Youth ==
Jean-Jacques spent his youth in the small town of Saint-Brice-en-Coglès in Brittany together with his brothers and parents, both of whom were physicians. As a youngster, not partial to the advance of rock 'n' roll, he had a passion for Ferré and Brel. When his parents divorced in the early 1960s, he went to live with his mother in New York, allowing him to broaden his musical horizon and discover American music. While studying at the Lycée français, he learned to play the guitar. After returning to France to live with his father, he entered a TV talent show but was unsuccessful. Refusing to let him live the life of a "vagabond", his parents pressured him into studying medicine.

== Early career ==
During his studies he discovered a passion for photography, which brought him into contact with the music business: through a family friend he had a chance to make record sleeves for artists like Alice Dona, Hervé Vilard and Gilbert Bécaud. The latter introduced him to producer Patrick Legrand (brother of composer Michel Legrand), to whom he showed some lyrics he had written. This started his career as a songwriter, writing for artists like Marie Laforêt and Gérard Lenorman. Soon after he signed a contract with Pathé-Marconi.

In 1974, Jean-Jacques, now using the stage name Nicolas Peyrac, released his first two singles, but to limited or no success.

== Success ==
Just when he was about to lose his record deal with Pathé due to failure of success, Nicolas released the critically acclaimed 1975 song So far away from L.A., which made him an overnight star. Dropping his medical studies almost near the end (in his sixth year), he concentrated on his musical career, releasing his next hit song Et mon père ("And my father") for which he received a 'French Grammy', the prix de l’UNAC. Within a few months, he became part of the most talented musicians of his generation.

Continuing the 1975 success, Nicolas released several albums, and was supporting act for stars like Serge Lama, Marie-Paule Belle et Dalida. He also regularly headlined, taking him all the way to Japan.

== Decline ==
After the death of his mother in 1978, to whom he dedicated his fifth album J't'aimais, j'ai pas changé ("I loved you, I haven't changed"), Nicolas continued touring and releasing albums, but the times of hit records seemed a thing of the past. Although writing songs for stars like Johnny Hallyday and Plácido Domingo, his own career lost ground, and by the mid-eighties he focused on different passions, writing novels and directing. At the end of the eighties, Nicolas faced a relational crisis and professional difficulties, and he fell into a severe depression, abandoning the music scene and failing to finish his novel and songs he was writing.

== Come-back ==
In 1992, Nicolas' close friend and colleague Michel Berger suddenly died of a heart attack, prompting him to take control of his life again. He started writing again, helped by former colleagues and friends, and released an album less than a year later. This marked his return to the spotlights, although it took some time for him to be fully back on track.

With his father's help, Nicolas emigrated to Montreal, Canada, giving him new energy and motivation. It is there he finished his novel, Qu'importe le boulevard où tu m'attends ("Whatever boulevard you wait for me"), published in 1994. In 1995, he temporarily returned to his father's home in Brittany, writing large parts of his 1995 album J'avance ("I progress"). Following its release, Nicolas extensively toured Quebec, and the following year he returned to France, starring at the Casino de Paris and the Bobino.

A conflict with his record company led to a two-year delay of his next album, Autrement ("Otherwise" or "Differently"), which was released in 1999 by an independent label. Although positively received by the critics, it failed to be noticed by the public.

== 2000s ==
Following the release of Autrement, Nicolas kept writing and recording almost non-stop. Through a friend he met his new manager, Pierre Illias, who arranged a record deal with BMG. A year later he released a new album, Seulement l'amour ("Only love"), followed in 2006 by Vice versa, both albums accompanied by extensive touring. 2006 also saw the publishing of his second novel, J'ai su dès le premier jour que je la tuerais ("I knew from day one I'd kill her"). In 2009 he released his latest album, Case départ ("Square one"), again followed by a tour, and his third novel, Elsa.

== Discography ==
- 1974 : So Far Away From LA
- 1975 : D'où venez-vous ?
- 1976 : Jumbo
- 1976 : Quand pleure la petite fille
- 1977 : Et la fête est finie
- 1978 : J't'aimais, j'ai pas changé
- 1980 : Disque d'or
- 1980 : Fait beau chez toi
- 1982 : Elle sortait d'un drôle de café
- 1983 : Flash-back
- 1984 : Neuvième
- 1986 : Laissez-moi rêver
- 1989 : J't'aimais trop, j't'aimerai tellement
- 1993 : Tempête sur Ouessant
- 1995 : J'avance
- 1999 : Autrement
- 2003 : Seulement l'amour
- 2005 : Toujours une route (compilation album)

List of studio albums, with selected chart positions
Title	Title	Peak chart positions
Title	Title	FRA
2006	Vice-versa	116
2009	Case départ	–
2011	Monterey	108
2013	Et nous voilà!	88

== Bibliography ==
- 1994 : Qu'importe le boulevard où tu m'attends
- 2006 : J'ai su dès le premier jour que je la tuerais
- 2009 : Elsa
