= V V Brown =

British singer and musician (born 1983)

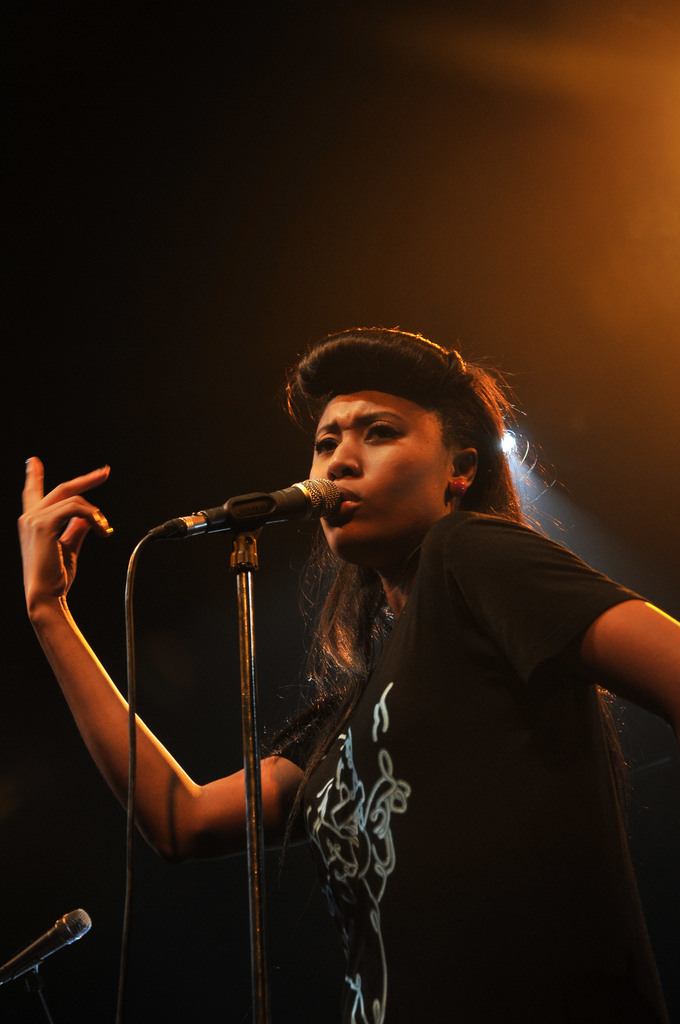
- Brown performing in 2008 at the Bristol O2 Academy

Background information
- Born: Vanessa Brown; 24 October 1983 (age 42); Northampton, Northamptonshire, England
- Genres: Indie pop, dance-punk
- Occupations: Singer-songwriter, model, producer
- Instruments: Vocals, piano, guitar, percussion
- Years active: 1998-present
- Labels: Island Records; Universal Republic Records; Universal Music Group; Capitol Records; EMI
- Website: vvbrown.com

Vanessa Brown (born 24 October 1983), known professionally as VV Brown, is a British indie pop singer-songwriter, model and record producer.

== Early life ==
Vanessa Brown was born in Northampton, England. She is the eldest of six siblings; her mother is Jamaican and her father is Puerto Rican.

She attended Overstone Park School near Northampton, which her parents own and work in. She then went to Kingsthorpe Upper School, now Kingsthorpe Community College, and sat her A-levels a year early.

Brown studied violin until the age of nine but gave up to focus on piano, vocals and trumpet, which she found easier. She completed her grade 8 trumpet examination aged 16 and played in jazz bands until the age of 21. Her childhood musical idols were jazz artists like Ella Fitzgerald and Dizzy Gillespie. She is also a lifelong hip-hop fan and was nicknamed "VV" by her peers as an MC at her middle school.

== Career ==
=== 2002–2006: Back to the Music ===
Aged 18, Brown attended an open audition for the VH1 Divas concert and was stopped outside the venue by an executive from London Records, who offered her a development deal. This ended a year later, at which point she was offered deals by Polydor in the UK and A&M Records in the US. She left both in 2006 after releasing one single and a promotional EP called Back to the Music.

=== 2007–2009: Travelling like the Light ===
Brown moved back to London and began performing in bars and clubs around the city. She was rediscovered by executive Darcus Beese and signed to Island Records. She recorded her debut album Travelling Like the Light between 2007 and 2008.

Brown said that most of the album's lyrics on the album, including those from its four singles Crying Blood, Leave!, Game Over and Shark in the Water, were about a failed affair she endured. "Shark in the Water" charted in the British, French and US charts, receiving gold status in the US and France in 2009, and sold over 1.5 million records to date.

=== 2011–2015: Lollipops & Politics cancellation, Samson & Delilah and Glitch ===
In 2011, prior to the mastering of Brown's second album Lollipops & Politics, a free preview mixtape called The Playground was released through SoundCloud.

Brown announced that the first single from Lollipops & Politics would be called "Children", featuring Chiddy of Chiddy Bang. This was released on iTunes in America on 20 September that year. On 4 October, Brown confirmed the title of the album and released the full track list, saying it would be released early in 2012. However, the release was postponed until 2013, and then called off completely; Brown posted on her Facebook account that she "didn't feel it was right as an artist". A new album called Samson & Delilah, recorded in London with Dave Okumu from The Invisible and former M83 member Pierre-Marie Maulini, was released in its place in September 2013. A track called 10 Ft. Tall, which was to be included on Lollipops & Politics, was released as a non-album single. The video of the first single, "Samson", premiered on 20 May.

In July 2015, Brown confirmed the release of her third studio album Glitch. The lead single "Shift" premiered on her SoundCloud account on 3 August. After funding the album's release via Pledge Music, Glitch was released on 25 September 2015 as a digital download, as well as on vinyl and CD.

=== 2020–present: Children's book and Am I British Yet? ===
On 2020, Brown wrote and published her first children's book, Lily and the Magic Comb. It was released through her own publishing house, Woke Kids Publishing. The book received positive reviews and was hailed as one of the top twelve children's books with empowering black characters by The Independent.

In 2023, Brown released her fourth studio album Am I British Yet? after a six-year hiatus.

== Touring ==
Brown toured extensively in 2008. Brown was invited by Damon Albarn to play on the Africa Express tour, and she sang with Fela Kuti's son Femi. Brown also toured with Ladyhawke and The Ting Tings and appeared at the Camden Crawl, The Great Escape, Evolution Music, Camp Bestival, Supersonic, and Turning Point festivals.

In March 2009, Brown played for the Teenage Cancer Trust event at the Royal Albert Hall. In June she played the Glastonbury Festival and was the only new artist to perform on the main stage. That year she also performed with Grace Jones and Sly and Robbie for Island Records' 50th anniversary concert at Shepherd's Bush Empire.

In 2010, Brown supported Swedish electronic band Little Dragon on the US leg of their tour and was an opening act for Pink in the UK leg of her summer Carnival Tour. She was also an opening act for Maroon 5, which was her most extensive North American tour to date. She also performed a sold-out tour of small clubs in the US and at the SXSW festival's British Music Embassy in Austin, Texas. She performed with rapper Q-Tip and later appeared for a crowd of 20,000 in Morocco.

V V Brown has also toured with The Script, Ida Maria and collaborated or performed alongside Babyshambles, Annie Lennox, Paloma Faith, Kate Nash, Get Cape. Wear Cape. Fly, Chipmunk, N-Dubz, Reverend and The Makers, and many more.

== Fashion ==
In 2008, Brown took part in a charity fashion show hosted by Naomi Campbell at which she walked with models such as Tyson Beckford and Daisy Lowe. The following year, she modelled and performed at the Ashish fashion for London Fashion Week.

Brown has appeared in advertisement campaigns for Marks & Spencer alongside Twiggy, Lisa Snowdon, Ana Beatriz Barros and Dannii Minogue. Brown has also been photographed for several international magazines including i-D, Vogue, Paper, LOVE, Elle and Cosmopolitan.

In 2012, Brown launched an online clothing shop called VVVintage, which is now defunct.

== Charity ==
Brown has supported various charities such as the Teenage Cancer Trust, Oxfam, NSPCC, Recycling Foundation and the Bottle Top campaign and causes such as poverty alleviation in Africa and fair trade. She also made a video for Global Cool. Brown has also been involved in the Rockcorps shows which allows teenagers to work for their community in aid for a ticket to see a concert. Brown took part in both the London Rockcorps shows and did work in Paris with French young teenagers with a following concert.

== Television ==
In November 2010, V V Brown was featured on the MTV series World of Jenks. The documentary series followed her as she tried to break into the U.S. music scene. Her music has also been synched in several American TV shows and movies, including CSI, Sex and The City, Ugly Betty, The Back Up Plan and Lesbian Vampire Killers.

V V Brown had her TV debut in the UK on Later...with Jools Holland in 2008 and also appeared on other TV shows such as the Alan Carr Show, The Album Chart Show, T4, GMTV. She made her French TV debut on Taratata in 2009 and the following day saw the album debut at number 1 on the digital chart. It led to other TV shows such as Le Grand Journal and other French TV shows.

Brown's American TV debut was on The Rachael Ray Show, leading to several other TV shows including The Late Show with David Letterman, Last Call with Carson Daly and The Ellen DeGeneres Show. Brown also performed on the BET show Black Girls Rock! in 2010, alongside artists such as Keyshia Cole, Jill Scott, Keri Hilson and Mary J. Blige. Brown said: "I found this a great opportunity as a black woman to be positive about other black women in music and the general black community."

In February 2011, Brown's song "Travelling Like the Light" was synched in the new BT advert in the UK, as well as landing a two-year synch deal on Canadian television for a car advertisement. The song "L.O.V.E." was used in commercials for Unilever's Best Foods/Hellmann's Mayonnaise in the United States.

Brown, for the second time in her career, appeared on the show Later... with Jools Holland in October 2013. She performed "Faith" and "The Apple" from Samson & Delilah. She also performed a live duet with Jools Holland, singing a version of "Sweet Dreams (Are Made of This)" by the Eurythmics.

== Discography ==
- Travelling Like the Light (2009)
- Samson & Delilah (2013)
- Glitch (2015)
- Am I British Yet? (2023)
