= Séchan =

Séchan is a surname. Notable people with the surname include:

- Charles Séchan (1803–1874), French painter and theatre designer
- Edmond Séchan (1919–2002), French cinematographer and film director
- Lolita Séchan, French writer
- Olivier Séchan (1911–2006), French writer
- Thierry Séchan (1949–2019), French journalist and writer
