= Le Retour de Gérard Lambert =

Studio album by Renaud
- Released: 1981
- Recorded: 1981
- Studio: Studio Ramsès, Paris
- Genre: Chanson, rock
- Length: 42:49
- Language: French
- Label: Polydor
- Producer: Ramses

Renaud chronology
Marche à l'ombre (1980)	Le Retour de Gérard Lambert (1981)	Morgane de toi (1983)

Le Retour de Gérard Lambert is the fifth studio album by French singer-songwriter Renaud. It was released in 1981 by Polydor Records. In Renaud's overall discography the album was released between two live albums, Un Olympia pour moi tout seul (1982) and Le P'tit Bal du samedi soir et autres chansons réalistes (1981).

The album title refers to Gérard Lambert, a character from a song on Renaud's previous studio album Marche à l'ombre, who by this stage has improved his lot from riding a mobylette to driving a Simca 1000.

== Songs ==
"Le Père Noël noir" (French for "Black Father Christmas") tells the story of a black burglar that Renaud mistakes for Santa Claus. "Oscar" pays homage to Renaud's grandfather who had been a communist trade-unionist and "La Blanche" was a widely acclaimed anti-drug anthem. "Soleil immonde" was written by a close friend of Renaud, the French humorist Coluche whose 1986 death would provide the inspiration for Renaud's later album Putain de camion.

== Track listing ==
All songs were written by Renaud Séchan except where noted.

=== Side one ===
1. "Banlieue rouge" – 4:01
2. "Manu" – 2:42
3. "Le Retour de Gérard Lambert" (lyrics: Renaud Séchan; music: Jean-Philippe Goude) – 4:11
4. "Le Père Noël noir" – 3:26
5. "J'ai raté Télé-Foot" – 3:05
6. "Oscar" – 4:10

=== Side two ===
1. "Mon beauf'" (lyrics: Renaud Séchan; music: Alain Ranval) – 4:00
2. "La Blanche" – 4:22
3. "Soleil immonde" (Michel Colucci) – 3:49
4. "Étudiant-poils aux dents" – 4:28
5. "À quelle heure on arrive?" – 4:40

"Manu" was used on the live album Visage pâle rencontrer public. Tracks 1, 2 and 7 were included on the compilation The Meilleur of Renaud (75–85). Tracks 2, 3, 7 and 8 were also included on the CD Ma Compil. Tracks 2 and 8 were covered for the tribute album La Bande à Renaud.

== Personnel ==
- Renaud – vocals
- Alain Ranval – guitar
- Jean-Michel Kadjan – guitar
- Patrice Meyer – guitar
- Jean-Pierre "Rolling" Azoulay – guitar
- Jean-Philippe Goude – keyboards
- Bob Boisadan – keyboards
- Jean-Louis Roques – accordion
- Gérard Prévost – bass
- Amaury Blanchard – drums
- Klaus Blasquiz – percussion, background vocals
- Vincent Barres – percussion, background vocals
- Bertrand Auger – horns
- Pierre Rigaud – horns
- Dominic Derasse – horns
- Patrick Bourgoin – horns
- Jean-Marc Welsh – horns
- Carole Rowley – background vocals
- "Wino" – background vocals
- Coluche – background vocals
- Professeur Choron – background vocals
