= Marchand de cailloux =

Studio album by Renaud
- Released: 1 October 1991
- Recorded: 1991
- Genre: Rock/Chanson
- Length: 52:52
- Label: Virgin Music
- Producer: Pete Briquette

Renaud chronology
Putain de camion (1989)	Marchand de cailloux (1991)	Renaud cante el' Nord (1993)

Marchand de cailloux is a studio album from French artist Renaud. It was released in 1991 and seen as a return to form after the less positive reviews for the previous album, Putain de camion.

In this album Renaud again takes up socio-political themes. Le Tango des Élus mocks politicians, La ballade nord-irlandaise is a pacifist song evoking the troubles of Northern Ireland (later reprised in 2009's Molly Malone – Balade irlandaise), and 500 connards sur la ligne de départ makes fun of the "morons" who race in the African desert (i.e. the Paris-Dakar Rally), oblivious to the misery surrounding them.

== Track listing ==
1. "Marchand de cailloux"
2. "L'aquarium"
3. "P'tit voleur"
4. "Olé"
5. "Les dimanches à la con"
6. "Dans ton sac"
7. "Le tango des élus"
8. "La ballade nord-irlandaise"
9. "500 connards sur la ligne de départ"
10. "Tonton"
11. "Je cruel"
12. "C'est pas du pipeau"
13. "Ma chanson leur a pas plu" (Suite)
14. "Tant qu'il y aura des ombres"

== Reception ==
Professional ratings
Review scores
Source	Rating
Allmusic	5/5 stars

The album received positive reviews.

"Ma chanson leur a pas plu" (suite) is a sequel to the song on Morgane de toi. Tracks 1 and 3 were included on the 2007 compilation The Meilleur Of Renaud. Track 8 was covered for the tribute album La Bande à Renaud.
