= Jean-Philippe Goude =

French composer and keyboardist (born 1952)

Jean-Philippe Goude is a French composer and keyboardist, born in Paris on 27 July 1952.

== Early work ==
- 1969: first compositions
- 1975: composition and recording of the soundtrack for Frankenstein, a play by Philippe Adrien at Théâtre de la Roquette (Paris)
- 1975: publication of the album Jeunes Années (Saravah)
- 1976 to 1979: participation in the group Weidorje - keyboards and composition
- 1979: publication of the album Drônes
- 1979: artistic direction and arrangements for Dick Annegarn.
- 1979 to 1983: participation in the group Odeurs- compositions, arrangements, artistic direction
- 1979 to 1985: artistic direction, arrangements and orchestration on the albums by Renaud:
  - Marche à l'ombre
  - Le Retour de Gérard Lambert
  - Morgane de toi
  - Mistral gagnant
  - Putain de camion

== Creations and publications ==
- Salve Regina for contralto, violin, cello and piano. Premiere April 1992, at Théâtre des Champs-Élysées (Paris) at the festival Musicora. Interpreted by Gérard Lesne (contralto), Johannes Leertouwer (violin), Bruno Cocset (cello) and Marie-Pierre Brun (piano)
- 1992: publication of the CD De Anima
- 1994: publication of the CD Ainsi de Nous
- 1994: creation of the ensemble Jean-Philippe Goude
- 1996: publication of the CD La Divine Nature des Choses.
- 2001: publication of the CD Rock de Chambre

== Music for films ==
- Au crépuscule des temps (Sarah Lévy),
- Nos enfants chéris (Benoît Cohen),
- Les gardiens de la mer (Christiane Le Hérissey),
- A Question of Taste (Bernard Rapp),
- The Creator (Albert Dupontel),
- Marie Lester TV series / France 3,
- Une semaine au salon (Dominique Baron),
- Tiré à part (Bernard Rapp),
- Sortez des rangs (Jean-Denis Robert),
- Comme par hasard (Maurice Dugowson),
- Puzzle (Maurice Dugowson),
- Chantons en chœur (Maurice Dugowson),
- Elle voit des nains partout (Jean-Claude Sussfeld),
- Circulez y'a rien à voir (Patrice Leconte),
- Viens chez moi, j'habite chez une copine (Patrice Leconte), etc.

== Awards ==
- 1989: Gold Award of the Blu-ray Disc Association of Los Angeles for the soundtrack of Frédéric Mitterrand's Late Pass.
- 1991: Prize of the Society of authors, composers and editors of music in 1st Festival of Biarritz, for original music in the film EDF-Industries
- 1997: **** (four stars) in The World of Music for the CD La Divine Nature des Choses
- 2003: Prize for the soundtrack in 1st Festival Cinématographique de Saint-Malo, for the soundtrack for the film Nos enfants chéris
