= Boucan d'enfer =

Studio album by Renaud
- Released: 13 August 2002
- Recorded: 2002
- Genre: Rock/Chanson
- Length: 53:04
- Label: Virgin Records
- Producer: Jean-Pierre Buccolo

Renaud chronology
Renaud chante Brassens (1996)	Boucan d'enfer (2002)	Rouge Sang (2006)

Boucan d'enfer is a studio album from French artist Renaud. It was released in 2002 and published by Virgin Records. It was Renaud's first production with original material since 1994's À la belle de mai.

It marked Renaud's comeback to the musical scene after years of alcoholism. Some of the songs thus refer to this period, especially the first track, Docteur Renaud, Mister Renard which opposes the good and the bad sides of the past and present Renaud in an obvious parody of Dr Jekyll & Mr Hyde. The track was released as a single and proved a minor success hitting number 25 on the French charts.

His separation from his wife is also very present in the lyrics, but the usual social themes haven't been left out either. Petit pédé is the story of a homosexual who left his country town after his coming out. But the song Manhattan-Kaboul, a duet with Belgian Axelle Red, became the most recognised song of the album, and one of Renaud's biggest hits (the single spent five months in the French top twenty with two weeks at number 2). In Manhattan-Kaboul Renaud talks about a Puerto Rican immigrant worker who died in the 9/11 attack, while Axelle Red tells the story of a young Afghan girl who died when the US-led coalition attacked her country in retaliation. "Corsic'armes" focuses on nationalism in Corsica, the song being dedicated to 'Christel' (Christelle), the widow of assassinated FLNC-Canal Historique guerrilla leader François Santoni.

Some of the album's songs have more humorous tones, for example Baltique, which is about François Mitterrand's dog, who wasn't allowed to attend his master's funeral. Renaud writes "But one day, I know God will recognise dogs". L'entarté, on the other hand, is an all-out attack on philosopher Bernard-Henri Lévy, although he is only mentioned as "l'entarté", a reference to his numerous encounters with cream pie flinger Noël Godin. The album cover was shot in the bar at the Closerie des Lilas, the Left Bank cafe made famous by its patronage by Paris's literati since 1847.

== Track listing ==
1. "Docteur Renaud, Mister Renard"
2. "Petit pédé"
3. "Je vis caché"
4. "Coeur perdu"
5. "Manhattan-Kaboul" (with Axelle Red)
6. "Elle a vu le loup"
7. "Tout arrêter..."
8. "Baltique"
9. "L'entarté"
10. "Boucan d'enfer"
11. "Mon nain de jardin"
12. "Mal barrés"
13. "Corsic'armes"
14. "Mon bistrot préféré"

== Reception ==
Professional ratings
Review scores
Source	Rating
Allmusic	5/5 stars

The album received positive reviews. Track 5 was covered for the tribute album La Bande à Renaud.

== Charts ==
=== Weekly charts ===
Chart (2002)	Peak position
Belgian Albums (Ultratop Wallonia)	1
French Albums (SNEP)	1
Swiss Albums (Schweizer Hitparade)	1

=== Year-end charts ===
Chart (2002)	Position
Belgian Albums (Ultratop Wallonia)	2
French Albums (SNEP)	2
Swiss Albums (Schweizer Hitparade)	14
Worldwide Albums (IFPI)	49

Chart (2003)	Position
Belgian Albums (Ultratop Wallonia)	45
French Albums (SNEP)	21

== Certifications ==
Region	Certification	Certified units/sales
Belgium (BRMA)	Platinum	78,000
France (SNEP)	Diamond	2,100,000
Switzerland (IFPI Switzerland)	Platinum	45,000
