= Mistral gagnant (song) =

1985 single by Renaud

Single by Renaud

from the album Mistral gagnant
- Released: 1985
- Length: 2:45
- Label: Virgin
- Songwriter: Renaud Séchan
- Producer: Jean-Philippe Goude

"Mistral gagnant" is the title song from French singer Renaud's 1985 album Mistral gagnant. In the song, Renaud sings to his young daughter Lolita Séchan about his own childhood and realizes that time flies as will fly away the laughs of his daughter as a child.

This broad theme plus the very simple music make this song one of the classics among Renaud's "tender" songs. It was voted the French people's favorite song.

== Background ==
A mistral gagnant was a kind of famous candy which involved a lottery. Some of the Mistral candies were "winning" (gagnant) and one could get another one for free. When Renaud was an adult, these candies were not on sale anymore.

Renaud says that he never intended to include the song on his album eventually called Mistral gagnant. He reasoned that the lyrics were just too personal and would not interest the general public. Calling his wife Dominique from the studio while recording his prospective album, he sang her parts of the song on the telephone. After his wife heard it, she loved the song and threatened him: "Si tu ne l'enregistres pas, je te quitte..." ("If you don't record this, I will leave you").

== Track listing ==
1. Side A: "Mistral gagnant" (2:45)
2. Side B: "Le retour de la pépette" (3:51)

== Covers ==
The song has been subject of many covers.

Lara Fabian covered it in her 2003 acoustic concerts at the Olympia in Paris. Her version appeared in En toute intimité album both the CD and DVD both recorded during her concerts on 2 and 3 February 2003.

Other famous covers include those of Yves Duteil, Amel Bent and Jean-Louis Aubert.

Live performances

There were also live performances by Vanessa Paradis & Maxime Le Forestier who sang it in a duet in the famous Les Enfoirés series. Their duo interpretation was one of the tracks selected for Les incontournables CD of Le meilleur des Enfoirés - 20 ans.

Jean-Louis Aubert sang it live as a duet with Carla Bruni, during the TV special Docteur Renaud, Mister Renard broadcast on France 2 on 29 March 2003.

The song has been a popular feature in television reality music contest. Contestant Ycare sang it on Nouvelle Star on M6 in 2008 and Camélia Jordana on the same program in 2009.

== Cœur de pirate version ==
"Mistral gagnant"

Single by Cœur de pirate

from the album La Bande à Renaud
- Released: 28 April 2014
- Recorded: 2013–2014
- Length: 3:04 (Album Version)
- Label: Mercury
- Songwriter: Renaud Séchan
- Producers: Dominique Blanc-Francard; Alain Lanty

In the 2014 tribute album to Renaud songs called La Bande à Renaud, the singer Cœur de pirate interpreted the song. Her version reached number 13 on SNEP, the official French Singles Chart and was also a hit in Belgium.

== Samplings ==
French rapper Booba used samplings of "Mistral gagnant" twice on his records in two different tracks.

In 2002, he used a sampling of the Renaud song on the track "Le bitume avec une plume" that appeared on his debut album Temps mort. The album made it to number 2 on the French Albums Chart.

He again used a sample of the song in his track "Pitbull", this time from his 2006 album Ouest Side. The album made it to number 1 on the French Albums Chart.

== Charts ==
Cœur de pirate version

Chart (2014)	Peak position
Ultratop (Belgian (Wallonia) Albums Chart)	17
SNEP (French Singles Chart)	13

Renaud original

Chart (2014)	Peak position
SNEP (French Singles Chart)	102
