= Patrice Meyer =

French electric guitarist

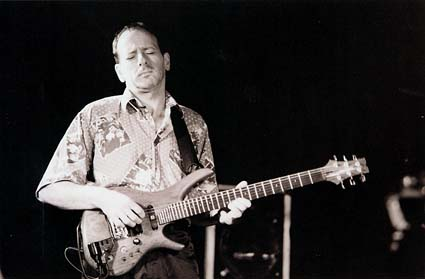

Background information
- Birth name: Patrice Meyer
- Born: 18 December 1957 (age 67); Strasbourg, France
- Genres: Progressive rock, Jazz, Jazz rock
- Occupation(s): Musician, Composer
- Instruments: Guitar
- Years active: 1973 – present
- Labels: Musea Records, FMR Records
- Website: Patrice Meyer official website

Patrice Meyer (b. 18 December 1957) is a French electric guitarist active in Jazz, Jazz rock, Progressive rock and Canterbury scene bands.

== History ==
Patrice Meyer was born in Strasbourg in the Alsace region of France. He began teaching himself guitar at an early age (10), sneaking into his older brother’s room to handle his guitar. Being self-taught, he didn’t know anything about proper guitar technique, or how to use a plectrum, so he developed a unique polyphonic style of fingerpicking using all five fingernails of his right hand. At 16 he joined his older brother’s band, playing mostly Progressive rock. In 1977 he turned professional, opening as a solo act for Magma and Gong when they played Strasbourg. Moving to Paris that year he met John McLaughlin, helping him with his French while John helped him with his English. Meyer continued playing opening gigs for famous jazz musicians coming through Paris, including jazz guitarist Jim Hall — who in 1981 said of Meyer in a magazine interview with Martine Palmé, "He's got such an amazing right hand technique that it almost gave me stagefright." In 1983 Meyer met Australian fusion guitarist Frank Gambale at the Musicians Institute in Hollywood, sharing the stage in a widely publicized ‘guitar duel.’

That same year Meyer released his first solo album, entitled Racines Croisées, featuring guitarist Philippe Petit, keyboardist Patrick Morgenthaler, bassist Henri Texier, and drummer Jacques Mahieux.

In 1985 (age 27) Meyer met drummer Pip Pyle in Lillers when he opened for Soft Heap. Pip introduced him to Hugh Hopper of the Canterbury scene, of which Meyer was soon to become an honorary member. In ’86 Meyer hired Pip & Hugh for the Patrice Meyer Quartet (with Patrick Morgenthaler), and together they toured the continent extensively, and released Meyer’s second solo album, Dromadaire Viennois. Also during this time he was a member of the French Zeuhl band Anaid.

In 1989 Hugh Hopper recruited him for his Franglo-Dutch band, which featured saxophonist Frank van der Kooij. They released three albums and toured Europe before breaking up in 1995. He toured with Richard Sinclair’s RSVP in 1994, and the following year with Pip’s Equip’Out. He also formed the trio Tertio with organist Emmanuel Bex and Pip Pyle. With the Paris-based ensemble Polysons he performed a series of concerts in 1997 devoted to the music of The Beatles and Soft Machine. In 2002 he joined Pip’s new band Bash, performing at the Progman Cometh Festival in Seattle and releasing the album Belle Illusion. The following year he became a member of the Didier Malherbe Trio and started his own trio with Rémy Chaudagne and Jean-Baptiste Cortot. In 2006 he performed in a tribute to the late Elton Dean with Pierre-Olivier Govin, Michel Delville, Hugh Hopper, Didier Malherbe, Frank van Kooj, Sophia Domancich, and Charles Calamel. In June 2008 he appeared at the Tritonales Festival with John Etheridge.

== Discography ==
Year	Artist	Title
1980	Renaud	Marche à l'ombre
1981	Renaud	Le Retour de Gérard Lambert
1983	Patrice Meyer	Racines Croisées
1986	Patrice Meyer	Dromadaire Viennois
1986	Anaid	Vêtue De Noir
1989	Anaid	Belladonna
1989	Hugh Hopper Band	Mecano Pelorus
1991	Anaid	Four Years (compilation Belladonna + most of Vêtue De Noir)
1993	Hugh Hopper Band	Hooligan Romantics
1995	Hugh Hopper Band	Carousel
1995	Tertio	1 + 1 + 1 = 4
2001	John Greaves	On the street where you live
2004	Pip Pyle’s Bash	Belle Illusion
2004	Pip Pyle’s Equip'Out	Instants

== Bandology ==
- 1973-1979 local jazz rock bands
- 1979-1981 solo & duet with guitarist Philippe Petit
- 1981 tour with bassist Henri Texier and drummer/pianist Bernard Lubat
- 1983-1989 Anaid
- 1986-1987 Quartet with bassist Hugh Hopper, keyboardist Sophia Domancich and drummer Pip Pyle
- 1989 Hugh Hopper’s Franglo-Dutch band
- 1989 Trio with percussionist Pierre Moerlen and bassist Thierry Eckert
- 1994-1995 Tertio with drummer Pip Pyle and organist Emmanuel Bex
- 1994 & 1996 gigs with bassist & vocalist Richard Sinclair and reed player Tony Coe and RSVP
- 1995 Pip Pyle’s Equip’Out
- 1997-1999 Polysons (tributes to The Beatles and Soft Machine)
- 1999-2002 Roxongs with John Greaves and drummer Manu Denizet
- 1999 Quartet with Hugh Hopper, John Greaves & Pip Pyle
- 2000 tours Russia with Armenian duduk player Djivan Gasparyan and reed player Didier Malherbe
- 2002-2004 Pip Pyle’s Bash
- 2003 Didier Malherbe Trio (with drummer Philippe Foch)
- 2005 Patrice Meyer Trio (with bassist Rémy Chaudagne and drummer Jean-Baptiste Cortot)

== See also ==
- Official website: https://www.patricemeyer.com/
- YouTube video (in French) demonstrating Meyer’s fingerpicking
- Calyx: The Canterbury Music Website
