= Ma gonzesse =

Studio album by Renaud
- Released: 1979
- Recorded: 1979
- Studio: Studio des Dames, Paris
- Genre: Chanson
- Length: 34:49
- Language: French
- Label: Polydor
- Producer: Jacques Bedos

Renaud chronology
| Laisse béton (1977) | Ma gonzesse (1979) | Marche à l'ombre (1980) |

Ma Gonzesse (French slang for My Chick) is the name by which the third untitled studio album of French singer-songwriter Renaud is commonly referred to. It was released in 1979 by Polydor Records. Amongst the musicians accompanying Renaud was accordionist Marcel Azzola who had also played with Jacques Brel.

== Track listing ==
All songs were written by Renaud Séchan except where noted.

=== Side one ===
1. "Ma gonzesse" (lyrics: Renaud Séchan; music: Alain Brice) – 3:31
2. "Sans dec'" – 3:12
3. "La Tire à Dédé" – 3:42
4. "Ch'timi rock" – 2:45
5. "J'ai la vie qui m'pique les yeux" – 3:35

=== Side two ===
1. "C'est mon dernier bal" – 4:04
2. "Le Tango de Massy-Palaiseau" – 2:53
3. "Chanson pour Pierrot" – 2:50
4. "Salut manouche" – 4:10
5. "Peau aime" (live) – 4:12

Tracks 1 and 8 were included on the compilation The Meilleur of Renaud (75–85). Tracks 1 and 6 were also included on the CD Ma Compil. Tracks 1, 5 and 8 were covered for the tribute album La Bande à Renaud.
