= À la Belle de Mai =

Studio album by Renaud
- Released: 1994
- Recorded: 1994
- Genre: Chanson
- Length: 48:44
- Label: Virgin
- Producer: Ceci-Cela

Renaud chronology
Renaud cante el' Nord (1992)	À la Belle de Mai (1994)	Renaud chante Brassens (1996)

À la Belle de Mai is a studio album from French artist, Renaud. It was released in 1994 by Virgin Records and was awarded a platinum disc for sales in France. Considered to show a more personal, sensitive maturity than some of his earlier work the album includes a curious musing on death (Le Petit Chat est mort) and a song for Renaud's daughter Lolita Séchan (Lolito Lolita) that includes Corsican polyphonics.

== Track listing ==
1. "La Ballade de Willy Brouillard"
2. "À la Belle de Mai"
3. "C'est quand qu'on va où ?"
4. "Le Sirop de la rue"
5. "Devant les lavabos"
6. "Cheveu blanc"
7. "Le Petit Chat est mort"
8. "Adios Zapata!"
9. "Son bleu"
10. "Mon amoureux"
11. "Lolito Lolita"
12. "La Médaille"

== Reception ==
Professional ratings
Review scores
Source	Rating
Allmusic	5/5 stars

The album received a positive review from AllMusic.

Track 3 was included on the 2007 compilation The Meilleur of Renaud. Tracks 3, 9 and 12 were covered for the tribute album La Bande à Renaud.
