= Alexis HK =

French singer

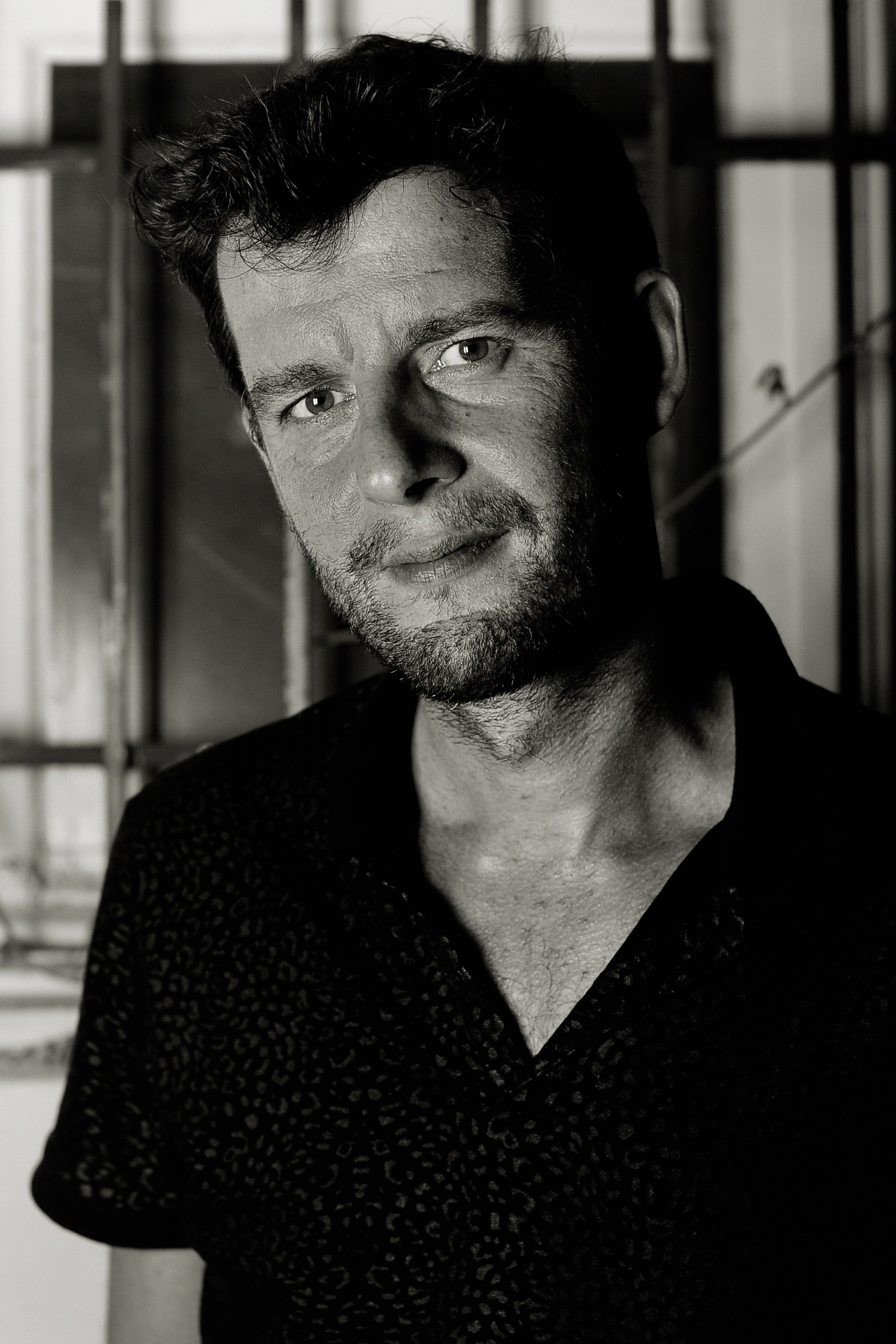
- Alexis HK - 08 2014

Background information
- Also known as: Alexis Hashka
- Born: Alexis Djoshkounian; 2 April 1974 (age 52); Yvelines, France
- Origin: Armenian Canadian residing in Montreal, Quebec, Canada
- Occupations: Singer, songwriter
- Instrument: Vocals
- Years active: 1997–present
- Labels: Musiques Hybrides, Labels, La Familia

Alexis Djoshkounian better known by his stage name Alexis HK (born 2 April 1974 in Yvelines, France) is a French singer-songwriter.

== Career ==
Alexis Djoshkounian started music at early age. In 1997, he was discovered by Olaf Hund, the manager of Musiques Hybrides label where he recorded his debut album Anti-héros notoire under the pseudonyme Alexis Hashka. A limited production, he sold it during his tours. "C'que t'es belle" was used in the compilation album Petites scènes en chanson increasing his popularity. He toured for various concerts between 1998 and 2000, accompanied by Emmanuel "Mana" Chabbey (double bass), Philippe Létang (bass, guitar), Peyo Lissarrague (percussions, drums) and brothers and Trad'Ouir members Marc Riou (percussions, flute) and Grégoire Riou (accordion).

His second album Belle Ville was released in 2002 again by Hund. With greater success of the follow-up album he signed with Labels, who also re-edited and issued his debut album again, adding three more bonus tracks and a music video remake for the successful single "C'que t'es belle". Hashka (shortened as HK) launched further promotional tours, also being featured at music festival including "Printemps de Bourges" and Les Francofolies de La Rochelle.

In 2004, still with Labels, he added further musicians Jérome Boivin the double bass player of Java and the guitar player Sébastien Martel as well as Norwegian singer Silje Grepp in his tours, and in 2005 released C'que t'es belle en live that included many live pieces recorded during a session with radio station FIP (also known as France Inter Paris). In 2007, he opened for singer Renan Luce.

On 23 March 2009, he released his album Les Affranchis produced by Matthieu Ballet with Alexis HK band musicians Philippe Entressangle, Simon Mary, Pierre Sangra, Joseph Racaille, Jerome Bensoussan and invitees Liz Cherhal and Renan Luce as backing vocals. This was followed by an extensive tour that ended with a concert at l'Olympia in Paris on 6 December 2010. 2011 saw another 2-month tour under the title Seuls à trois with Renan Luce and Benoît Dorémus.

In September 2012, he released his album Le dernier présent with the title track pre-released as a single.

== Personal life ==
- Alexis Djoshkounian is a French singer of Armenian origin.
- He is companion of Liz Cherhal. With her, he has written a book CD for children under the title Ronchonchon et compagnie. Juliette, Jehan and Loïc Lantoine also took part in the recording.
- He has also made a 52-minute auto-portrait documentary titled Ainsi parlait... Alexis HK that was directed by Serge Gauthier-Pavlov and released through "L'AUTRE Film".
- He has also contributed to Bordel, a literary magazine published by Frédéric Beigbeder and Stéphane Million.

== Discography ==
=== Albums ===
Studio albums

Year	Album	Peak positions	Certification	Notes
Year	Album	FR	Certification	Notes
1997	Anti-héros notoire	–		
2002	Belle ville	150		
2004	L'homme du moment	128		
2009	Les Affranchis	69		
2012	Le dernier présent	22		
2017	Georges & moi	156		

Live albums

Year	Album	Peak positions	Certification	Notes
Year	Album	FR	Certification	Notes
2005	C’que t’es belle en live	–		

Book albums (songs and spoken text album)

Year	Album	Peak positions	Certification	Notes
Year	Album	FR	Certification	Notes
2010	Ronchonchon et compagnie	146		

=== Singles ===
Year	Album	Peak positions	Certification	Notes
Year	Album	FR	Certification	Notes
2012	"Le dernier présent"	192		
