= Laisse béton =

Studio album by Renaud
- Released: 1977
- Recorded: 1977
- Studio: Studios I.P., Paris
- Genre: Chanson
- Length: 36:18
- Language: French
- Label: Polydor
- Producer: Jacqueline Herrenschmidt

Renaud chronology
Amoureux de Paname (1975)	Laisse béton (1977)	Ma gonzesse (1979)

French singer-songwriter Renaud's second unnamed studio album is commonly known as Laisse béton, although it is sometimes referred to as Place de ma mob after the wall inscription on the album cover. It was released in 1977 by Polydor Records. The title is verlan for "laisse tomber" ("drop it, forget about it", lit. "let it fall"), from the first song on the album.

== Track listing ==
All songs were written by Renaud Séchan except where noted.

=== Side one ===
1. "Laisse béton" – 2:30
2. "Le blues de la Porte d'Orléans" – 3:10
3. "La chanson du loubard" (Muriel Huster, Renaud Séchan) – 2:35
4. "Je suis une bande de jeunes" (Renaud Séchan, François Bernheim) – 3:00
5. "Adieu Minette" – 3:48
6. "Les charognards" – 4:22

=== Side two ===
1. "Jojo le démago" – 2:26
2. "Buffalo débile" – 2:19
3. "La boum" – 3:00
4. "Germaine" – 3:15
5. "Mélusine" – 1:37
6. "La bande à Lucien" – 2:52

Tracks 1 and 3 were included on the compilation The Meilleur of Renaud (75–85). Track 1 was also included on the CD Ma Compil. Tracks 1, 4 and 5 were covered for the tribute album La Bande à Renaud.

== Personnel ==
- Renaud – vocals, lead guitar
- Alain Le Douarin – guitar
- Patrice Caratini – double bass
- Alain Labacci – guitar, banjo
- Joss Baselli – accordion, bandoneón
- Christian Lété – percussion
- Jean-Jacques Milteau – harmonica

Technical

- Georges Blumenfeld - recording, mixing
- David Séchan - photography
