= Mistral gagnant =

Mistral Gagnant

Studio album by Renaud
- Released: 1985
- Recorded: 1985
- Studio: Rumbo Recorders, Canoga Park, Los Angeles; re-recorded at Studio Du Palais Des Congrès, Paris; Studio Plus XXX, Paris
- Genre: Rock/Chanson
- Length: 41:38
- Label: Virgin
- Producer: Jean-Philippe Goude

Renaud chronology
| Morgane de toi (1983) | Mistral Gagnant (1985) | Putain de camion (1988) |

Mistral gagnant is a studio album from French artist Renaud on the Virgin France label, now part of EMI, released in 1985.

The first song, "Miss Maggie", made Renaud a controversial character in the United Kingdom because the song praises women for their non-violence and honesty with the exception of PM Margaret Thatcher (a version of the song with the lyrics adapted in English was also recorded). The last verses read (translated from French): "In the final hour, [...] if I can stay on earth, I would like to become a dog and have Margaret Thatcher as a lamp post to urinate against, daily." It was composed with Jean-Pierre Bucolo, who also helped with "La pêche à la ligne" and "Si t'es mon pote", while Franck Langolff co-wrote the music for "Morts les enfants" and "Fatigué".

In the title song "Mistral gagnant", Renaud sings to his young daughter about his childhood and realizes that time flies as will fly away the laughs of his daughter as a child. This broad theme plus the very simple music makes this song one of the classics among Renaud's "tender" songs. A mistral gagnant was a kind of candy and a lottery. Some of them were "winning" (gagnant) and you could get another one for free. These candies were not on sale anymore when he wrote the song.

== Track listing ==
1. "Miss Maggie".
2. "La pêche à la ligne" [Going fishing]
3. "Si t'es mon pote" [If you're my mate]
4. "Mistral gagnant"
5. "Trois matelots" [Three sailors]
6. "Tu vas au bal?" [Are you going dancing?]
7. "Morts les enfants" [Dead the children]
8. "Baby-sitting blues"
9. "P'tite conne" [Silly fool]
10. "Le retour de la Pépette"
11. "Fatigué" [Fed up]

Tracks 1, 2, 4, 6, 7 and 11 are all used on the live album Visage pâle rencontrer public. Tracks 1, 2, 4, 7 and 11 were included on the 2007 compilation The Meilleur of Renaud. Tracks 1, 2, 4, 7 and 9 were covered for the tribute album La Bande à Renaud.

== Personnel ==
- Renaud - vocals, backing vocals
- Jean-Philippe Goude, Randy Kerber - keyboards
- Neil Stubenhaus - bass
- Mick "Pooh" Baird - drums
- Judith Chilnick, Paulinho Da Costa - percussion
- Jean-Louis Roques - accordion
- Ernie Watts, Larry Klimas - saxophone
- John Johnson - tuba
- Georges Costa, Jean-Jacques Cramier, Klaus Blasquiz, Michel Adjaj, Michel Costa - backing vocals
- Donn Wilkerson - string conductor

== Certifications ==
| Region | Certification | Certified units/sales |
|---|---|---|
| France (SNEP) | Diamond | 1,300,000 |
