= Amoureux de Paname =

Studio album by Renaud
- Released: April 3, 1975
- Recorded: 1975
- Genre: Chanson
- Length: 36:57
- Language: French
- Label: Polydor
- Producer: Jacqueline Herrenschmidt, François Bernheim

Renaud chronology
Amoureux de Paname (1975)	Laisse béton (1977)

Amoureux de Paname is the title by which the unnamed debut album from French singer-songwriter Renaud is commonly known. It was released in 1975 by Polydor Records, and while not a commercial success, anti-bourgeoisie songs like "Hexagone" caused considerable public interest and provided Renaud a springboard to his future success.

== Track listing ==
All songs were written by Renaud Séchan except where noted.

=== Side one ===
1. "Amoureux de Paname" – 2:32
2. "Société, tu m'auras pas!" – 2:30
3. "Petite fille des sombres rues" – 2:30
4. "La Java sans joie" – 3:49
5. "Gueule d'aminche" – 4:19
6. "La Coupole" – 1:45

=== Side two ===
1. "Hexagone" – 5:30
2. "Écoutez-moi les gavroches" (Renaud Séchan, Jacqueline Néro, François Bernheim) – 3:28
3. "Rita (Chanson d'amour)" – 0:36
4. "Camarade bourgeois" – 2:23
5. "Le Gringalet" – 2:21
6. "La Menthe à l'eau" – 2:42
7. "Greta" – 2:03

Tracks 2 and 7 were included on the compilation The Meilleur of Renaud (75–85). Track 7 was also included on the CD Ma Compil. Track 7 was covered for the tribute album La Bande à Renaud.

== Personnel ==
- Renaud - vocals
- François Bernheim - musical direction
- Jacqueline Herrenschmidt – musical direction
- Scarabee Blanc - arrangements, recording

Technical

- Claude Malet - photography
