= Marche à l'ombre =

Marche à l'ombre may refer to:

- Marche à l'ombre (album), a 1980 album by Renaud
- Marche à l'ombre (film), a 1984 French film
