= Manhattan-Kaboul =

Single by Renaud and Axelle Red

from the album Boucan d'enfer
- B-side: "Tout Arrêter"
- Released: 2002
- Genre: Pop, rock
- Length: 3:52
- Label: Ceci-Celà
- Songwriters: Renaud; Jean-Pierre Bucolo
- Producer: Jean-Pierre Bucolo

Renaud singles chronology
"Docteur Renaud, Mister Renard" (2002)	"Manhattan-Kaboul" (2002)	"Cœur perdu" (2002)

Axelle Red singles chronology
"Bimbo à moi" (2000)	"Manhattan-Kaboul" (2002)	"Je me fâche" (2002)

"Manhattan-Kaboul" is a French song written by Renaud and composed by Jean-Pierre Bucolo, sung by Renaud in duo with Axelle Red, from the album Boucan d'enfer (2002). It was written in the aftermath of the incidents of September 11, 2001 and the War in Afghanistan. The song was very successful in France and Belgium, becoming a top five hit in these countries. As of August 2014, it is the 67th best-selling single of the 21st century in France, with 355,000 units sold.

== Synopsis ==
In the song, two victims of the events of 2001 sing about their situations and the causes of their deaths. Renaud sings as a young Puerto Rican who works in the World Trade Center in New York City, destroyed on September 11. Axelle Red sings as a young Afghan girl killed during the attack by the coalition forces during the autumn of 2001.

The song utilizes symbolism and imagery, with a subtle religious undertone throughout. Though the song is about terrorism and its repercussions, it does not directly mention terrorism nor deal explicitly with political issues, focusing instead on civilian suffering caused by the events.

There are many religious images used throughout the song, such as "l'autel" (the altar), "les dieux" (the gods) and "les religions." The song concludes that religions, wars, and countries victimize ordinary people for their own purposes.

== Awards ==
The song was elected the "Original Song of the Year" at the Victoires de la Musique 2003 and the "French song of the Year" at NRJ Music Awards 2003.

== Cover versions and television performances ==
- Patrick Coutin, who had composed the famous hit "J'aime regarder les filles" in 1981, has covered the song in 2003 for the French programme Retour gagnant : a CD containing all the songs from the show has been released by Universal Music.
- Renaud performed "Manhattan-Kaboul" on October 30, 2004, with 500 singers from the choir "Les Fous chantants" of Alès on the show 500 Choristes ensemble on TF1.
- The song has been covered by Joan Baez.
- Philippe Berizzi has translated the song in Esperanto (he has received a permission for the translation).
- Laurent Gerra has parodied the song, under the title "Washington-Bagdad".

== Track listings ==
CD single

1. "Manhattan-Kaboul" — 3:52
2. "Tout Arrêter..." — 3:21

== Charts ==
=== Weekly charts ===
Weekly chart performance for "Manhattan-Kaboul"
Chart (2002)	Peak position
Belgium (Ultratop 50 Flanders)	34
Belgium (Ultratop 50 Wallonia)	4
Europe (Eurochart Hot 100 Singles)	8
France (SNEP)	2
Switzerland (Swiss Singles Chart)	37

=== Year-end charts ===
Year-end chart performance for "Manhattan-Kaboul"
Chart (2002)	Position
Belgium (Ultratop 50 Wallonia)	15
Europe (Eurochart Hot 100 Singles)	31
France (Airplay Chart)	6
France (TV Music Videos Chart)	35
France (SNEP)	9

== Certifications ==
Certifications for "Manhattan-Kaboul"
Region	Certification	Certified units/sales
France (SNEP)	Platinum	500,000^{*}
^{*} Sales figures based on certification alone.

== See also ==
- List of anti-war songs
