= Rouge Sang =

Studio album by Renaud
- Released: late September 2006
- Recorded: 1 November 2005/30 June 2006
- Genre: Rock/Chanson
- Label: Virgin
- Producer: Jean-Pierre Bucolo

Renaud chronology
Boucan d'enfer (2002)	Rouge Sang (2006)	Molly Malone – Balade irlandaise (2009)

Rouge Sang is a studio album by French singer Renaud released on October 2, 2006. It gained particular media attention for the song Elle est facho (She's a fascist) which portrays a female Front National voter. The song brought about a controversy because of its last verse à la facho... qui vote Sarko (to the fascist... who votes Sarko); Sarko being a nickname for the then minister and candidate for presidential election Nicolas Sarkozy. Sarkozy's party, UMP considered the song an unreasonable attack on the run up to the elections, but Sarkozy still won while Rouge Sang went platinum on the day of its release. The album spent nine weeks in the French top ten including two weeks at number 1 and it has gone on to sell over half a million copies.

The album was later repackaged with a live CD of the associated tour, Tournee Rouge Sang

== Track listing ==
=== CD1 ===
1. "Les Bobos" - 3:58
2. "Dans la Jungle" - 4:20
3. "Arrêter la clope!" - 3:35
4. "RS & RS" - 2:07
5. "Ma blonde" - 2:55
6. "Rouge Sang" - 2:55
7. "Elle est facho" - 3:03
8. "Les cinq sens" - 2:29
9. "J'ai retrouvé mon flingue!" - 4:31
10. "Nos vieux" - 4:30
11. "Filles de joie" - 2:29
12. "Danser à Rome" - 1:27

=== CD2 ===
1. "Pas de dimanches" - 2:42
2. "Adieu l'enfance" - 3:59
3. "Jusqu'à la fin du monde" - 4:23
4. "Sentimentale mon cul!" - 4:38
5. "Elsa" - 3:48
6. "Rien à te mettre" - 3:10
7. "À la téloche" - 3:32
8. "À la close" - 3:08
9. "Leonard's song" - 3:56
10. "Malone" - 2:50
11. "En la selva" - 4:19
12. "Je m'appelle Galilée" - 3:51

== Reception ==
Professional ratings
Review scores
Source	Rating
Allmusic	5/5 stars

The album received positive reviews.
