= Hubert-Félix Thiéfaine =

French pop-rock singer and songwriter (born 1948)

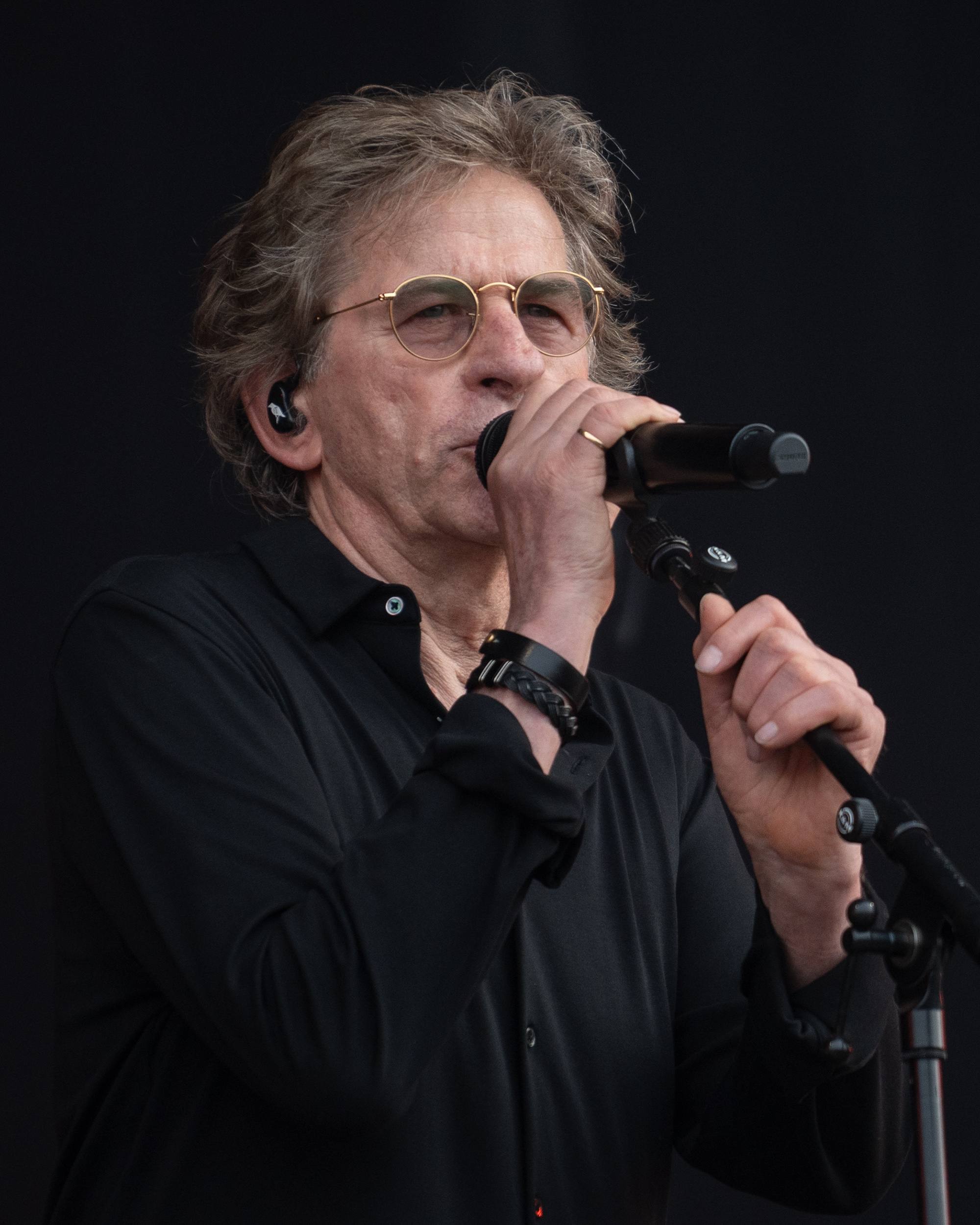

Background information
- Born: 21 July 1948 (age 78)
- Origin: Franche-Comté, France
- Genres: Pop, Rock
- Occupations: Singer, Writer, Composer
- Years active: 1978–present
- Label: Sony Music
- Website: Official site (in French)

Hubert-Félix Thiéfaine (French pronunciation: [ybɛʁ feliks tjefɛn]) is a French pop-rock singer and songwriter. He was born on 21 July 1948 in the town of Dole in the Jura département.

Mostly shunned by television and radio, he has built over the years – through word of mouth and frequent touring – a considerable following which allowed him to fill the 17,000-seater Palais omnisports de Paris-Bercy for an anniversary concert in 1998. In recent years he has been increasingly name-dropped as an influence by the latest generation of performers in France, and was the subject of a tribute album of covers in 2002. He has been performing since the late 1960s and releasing records since 1978.

Musically, Thiéfaine draws mostly from classic rock, with rare nods to the latest musical trends, and generally leaves the arranging to a collaborator. His songs are most notable for instantly recognisable lyrics, with their trademark streams of consciousness, surreal and often extreme or dark imagery, often tinged with comedy, cynicism, literary references, neologisms and liberal use of scientific, long or foreign words. The lyrical mayhem sometimes spreads into comically long song titles, such as Enfermé dans les cabinets (avec la fille mineure des 80 chasseurs), or Exercice de simple provocation avec 33 fois le mot "coupable". His education in a Catholic boarding school has also left deep traces which surface in his lyrics in the form of biblical quotations and cheerfully blasphemous lyrics.

His avowed influences include Léo Ferré, Lou Reed, Bob Dylan, Jim Morrison and many French, Anglophone and German novelists and poets, with a preference for romantic literature.

== Discography ==
=== Albums ===
Studio albums

- 1978 – Tout corps vivant branché sur le secteur étant appelé à s'émouvoir
- 1979 – Autorisation de délirer
- 1980 – De l'amour, de l'art ou du cochon
- 1981 – Dernières balises (avant mutation)
- 1982 – Soleil cherche futur
- 1984 – Alambic/sortie-sud
- 1986 – Météo für nada
- 1988 – Eros über alles
- 1990 – Chroniques bluesymentales
- 1993 – Fragments d'hébétude

Year	Title	Peak positions		
Year	Title	FR	BEL (Wa)	SWI
1996	La tentation du bonheur	27	–	–
1998	Le bonheur de la tentation	20	–	–
2001	Défloration 13	14	–	–
2005	Scandale mélancolique	14	89	–
2007	Amicalement Blues (joint album with Paul Personne)	19	77	–
2011	Supplément de Mensonges	2	22	32
2014	Stratégie de l'Inespoir	10	61	33
2021	Géographie du vide	–	6	6

Live albums

- 1983: En concert (double album vinyl or double CD)
- 1986: En concert vol. 2 (double album vinyl or double CD)
- 1988: Routes 88 (double album vinyl or simple CD)
- 1995: Paris-Zénith (double CD)

Year	Title	Peak positions			Notes
Year	Title	FR	BEL (Wa)	SWI	Notes
1999	En concert à Bercy	19	–	–	Double CD
2002	Au Bataclan	75	–	–	Live at Le Bataclan
2007	Scandale mélancolique Tour	58	–	–	Double album
2012	Homo Plebis Ultimae Tour	14	45	90	
2016	Vixi Tour XVII	10	43	69	

Compilations

- 1988: 1978–1983
- 1989: 1984–1988
- 1998: 1978–1998
- 2002: Les fils du coupeur de joints (homage & compilation)
- 2006: Les Indispensables – compilation
- 2009: Séquelles (Peaked in SNEP France #58 and BEL (Wallonia) #56)

=== Singles ===
Year	Title	Peak positions	Album
Year	Title	FR	Album
2012	"La ruelle des morts"	151	
2014	"En cloque"	114	La Bande à Renaud
2014	"Angélus"	173	

== Videos ==
- 1992 : Bluesymental tour (VHS)
- 1995 : Paris-Zénith (VHS)
- 1999 : En concert à Bercy (DVD)
- 2007 : Scandale mélancolique tour (DVD)
