= Marche à l'ombre (album) =

Studio album by Renaud
- Released: 1980
- Recorded: December 1979 – January 1980
- Studio: Studio Ramsès, Paris
- Genre: Chanson, rock
- Length: 38:21
- Language: French, English
- Label: Polydor
- Producer: Ramsés

Renaud chronology
Ma gonzesse (1979)	Marche à l'ombre (1980)	Le Retour de Gérard Lambert (1983)

Marche à l'ombre is the fourth studio album by French singer-songwriter Renaud, released in 1980 by Polydor Records. It is the first of Renaud's album that officially has a title, his three first albums being unnamed.

Marche à l'ombre contains three of Renaud's most popular songs:: "Marche à l'ombre" contains observations and aspersions cast on various characters who walk into the narrator's favorite bar as he relaxes with a pinball-obsessed friend. "Les Aventures de Gérard Lambert" is the tale of a fictional comic hero, a mobylette rider whose evening is ruined by a mechanical problem and a wise-cracking passerby. "Dans mon HLM" is a floor-by-floor description of the public housing block that Renaud lived in, from the nightwatchman on the ground floor to his girlfriend on the eighth floor.

"It Is Not Because You Are" also gained attention as a spoof attempt to sing in English. A mock ballad, it is a tortured variety of Franglais, with almost every line containing both English and French words.

"La Teigne" is the story of a youth who has grown up "on the state" ("Il était de l'assistance") who can't make friends and who commits suicide before his 20th birthday. "Baston" (French for "punch-up") tells the story of a person who aims to die young.

== Track listing ==
All songs were written by Renaud Séchan except where noted.

=== Side one ===
1. "Marche à l'ombre" – 3:16
2. "Les aventures de Gérard Lambert" (Renaud Séchan, Alain Ranval) – 3:46
3. "Dans mon H.L.M." – 6:00
4. "La teigne" – 2:43
5. "Où c'est qu'j'ai mis mon flingue?" – 3:03

=== Side two ===
1. "It Is Not Because You Are" – 3:20
2. "Baston!" (Renaud Séchan, Michel Roy) – 5:30
3. "Mimi l'ennui" – 3:56
4. "L'auto-stoppeuse" – 3:07
5. "Pourquoi d'abord?" – 3:21

Tracks 1 and 3 were included on the compilation The Meilleur of Renaud (75–85). Tracks 1, 3 and 6 were also included on the CD Ma Compil. Tracks 1, 3, 5 and 6 were covered for the tribute album La Bande à Renaud.

== Personnel ==
- Renaud Séchan – vocals
- Alain Ranval – guitar, background vocals
- Pierre "Pierrot" Chérèze – guitar
- Patrice Meyer – guitar
- Laurent De Gaspéris – guitar, background vocals
- Alain Marquez – guitar
- Gérard Prévost – bass
- Amaury Blanchard – drums
- Steve Sheshan – percussion
- Jean-Philippe Goude – keyboards, piano, harpsichord
- Laurent Gérôme – pedal steel guitar
- Guy Khalifa – flute, piano, background vocals
- Richard Raux – saxophone
- Alain Guillard – saxophone
- Yvon Guillard – trumpet
- David Rose – violin
- Monique Rollin – lute
- Daniel Neuranter – bassoon
- Lou "Léon" Gamme – alto flute
- Phillippe Vauville – background vocals
- Klaus Blasquiz – background vocals
- Shitty Télaouine – background vocals
- Stella Vander – background vocals
- Liza "Deluxe" Bois – background vocals
- Yves Poucel – background vocals (English)
- Hubert Varron - string conductor
