= Molly Malone – Balade irlandaise =

Studio album by Renaud
- Released: 23 November 2009
- Recorded: Windmill Lane Studios, Dublin
- Genres: Irish folk, chanson
- Label: EMI
- Producer: Thomas Davidson Noton

Renaud chronology
Rouge Sang (2006)	Molly Malone – Balade irlandaise (2009)	Toujours debout (2016)

Molly Malone – Balade irlandaise is an album by French singer-songwriter Renaud, released on 23 November 2009 on EMI Records. It is a collection of traditional-style Irish folk songs translated into French, an idea that had been maturing in Renaud's mind for almost two decades. Renaud had previously used Irish influences in his 1991 album Marchand de cailloux and did a low-key tour playing in Irish pubs in 1997.

The album was recorded at the Windmill Lane Studios in Dublin. It was produced by Frenchman Thomas Davidson Noton and arranged and mixed by Irish musician Pete Briquette, formerly the bass player with The Boomtown Rats. Accompanying musicians includes Terry Woods of The Pogues and musicians from Steeleye Span.

Despite mixed reviews in the press, Molly Malone – Balade irlandaise entered the French charts at number one in November 2009. It also reached the top 5 on the albums chart in the French-speaking part of Belgium.

The album title "Molly Malone" is assumed to be partly chosen as a reference to Renaud's son Malone. The second half of the title, "Balade irlandaise", is a play on words between "balade" (a stroll) and "ballade" (a ballad).

== Track listing ==
All tracks adapted by Renaud; except where noted.

1. "Vagabonds" – 3:36
2. "Belfast Mill" – 3:40
3. "Johnston's Motor Car" – 2:32
4. "Je Reviendrai" – 3:32
5. "Adieu à Rhondda" – 2:53
6. "La fille de Cavan" – 3:14
7. "Te marie pas, Mary!" (Leon Rosselson) – 3:32
8. "À Carlingford" – 3:32
9. "La Ballade nord-irlandaise" – 4:31
10. "Dubliners" – 4:16
11. "Willie McBride" – 7:33
12. "Incendie" – 3:38
13. "Molly Malone" – 2:54

Track 9 was included on the 2007 compilation The Meilleur of Renaud.

== Reception ==
Professional ratings
Review scores
Source	Rating
L'Express	(mixed)
Radio France Internationale	(favorable)
Télérama	(unfavorable)
24 heures	(mixed)

The album received mixed reviews by the press upon its release. Some reviewers noted the audible decline of Renaud's voice, resulting in the out-of-tune singing often overshadowing the music. In Télérama the reviewer harshly wrote:

But his painful voice generates such interfering sound that you forget everything else, the pretty melodies and texts that contain some inspired French translations. (...) Today, it's so blatant that it would be absurd and dishonest to pretend noticing nothing. It almost makes the lead singer of The Pogues pass as Caruso.

== Charts ==
Chart (2009)	Peak position
Belgian (Wallonia) Albums Chart	4
French Albums Chart	1
Swiss Albums Chart	34
