= Morgane de toi =

Studio album by Renaud
- Released: 1983
- Recorded: 1983
- Studio: Rumbo Recorders, Canoga Park, Los Angeles
- Genre: Rock/Chanson
- Length: 43:50
- Label: Polydor
- Producer: Thomas Davidson Noton

Renaud chronology
Le Retour de Gérard Lambert (1981)	Morgane de toi (1983)	Mistral gagnant (1985)

Morgane de toi is the sixth studio album from French artist Renaud, recorded in Canoga Park, Los Angeles, California, with American session musicians. It was released in 1983 under the Polydor label, and a remastered version was reissued in 2000, with a high-fidelity version appearing on Blu-ray in 2013 (2-channel, 96 kHz/24-bit).

It remains one of Renaud's most successful albums to date, including two of his most famous songs, the sea tale "Dès que le vent soufflera" and the ballad "Morgane de toi", about his daughter Lolita.

== Track listing ==
All lyrics and music by Renaud; except where noted.

1. "Dès que le vent soufflera"
2. "Deuxième génération"
3. "Pochtron!"
4. "Morgane de toi (Amoureux de toi)" (lyrics: Franck Langolff)
5. "Doudou s'en fout"
6. "En cloque"
7. "Ma chanson leur a pas plu..."
8. "Déserteur"
9. "Près des autos tamponneuses" (lyrics: Franck Langolff)
10. "Loulou"

== Songs ==
Dès que le vent soufflera
An upbeat, fast-paced tale of a young man who leaves his wife and family to take to the sea. But he learns that "C'est pas l'homme qui prend la mer, c'est la mer qui prend l'homme!" (It's not man who takes the sea, it's the sea who takes the man). Features various deliberate grammatical mistakes such as "Je repartira" and "Nous nous en allerons", as an openly easy way to satisfy the rhyme.
Deuxième génération
A slower, melancholic story of a young guy, son of immigrants (hence the "second generation") who lives on the street, "not far from La Défense", on the outskirts of Paris. The tale explains how his only pleasures in life are violence, being feared by people, music with friends and cheap drugs. Very good portrait of people (here Arabic origin, typical of the 1960s-1970s immigration in France) whose malaise is to feel foreigner in France as well as in their parents' country of origin.
Pochtron!
A parody on people who drink too much. A "pochtron" is a slang word for a drunkard. The narrator claims that "I don't throw up much, only when I mix different stuff. For example if people put water in my Ricard...", the joke being that Ricard is always drunk with water.
Morgane de toi
One of Renaud's greatest hits, for once the narrator is himself in this moving ballad. He describes his daughter at the age of about four years, projecting his worries for her future onto her. Anxious that she will be bossed around by the young "machos" in the playground he advises her to whack one in the back with her rake. The song has nine verses, arranged as follows: VBVVC, VBVVC, VBVVC CC where V is a verse, B is a short bridge and C is the chorus.
Doudou s'en fout
(Black Doudou isn't worried) A Caribbean-influenced parody of a young girl who works in a clothing shop in Paris. She sells overpriced bathing suits to rich, snobby women. Although she hates her job, in the end she doesn't care, because in August, Doudou is heading home, presumably to somewhere "warmer and more beautiful" (perhaps Guadeloupe or New Caledonia) where she can "burn her skin".
En cloque
(Knocked up) An interesting juxtaposition with "Morgane de toi", this is another slow autobiographical ballad, written before the birth of his daughter. He describes in his typical style his wife's pregnancy. It is sentimental, but slightly self-mocking, as he describes his inability to find something to do with himself as his wife goes through cravings. It features the memorable line "Même si je devenais pédé comme un phoque, je serais jamais en cloque" (even if I was gay as a lark, I would never be up the duff...).
Ma chanson leur a pas plu...
(They didn't like my song...) This parody of his fellow French pop stars is a hard-edged rock number as an imaginary autobiographical narration of Renaud's difficulties coming up with new tunes. Each verse is about a new number he has just written, but every time, upon hearing it, his close friends point out to him that this one is not of his usual style, and that he should forget it and start again. The songwriter then figures he can sell his failed composition to this one contemporary singer (a different one at each verse, namely Jean-Patrick Capdevielle, Bernard Lavilliers, and Francis Cabrel), but he never manages to convince them, even though each time the song in question is of the style of the given artist in turn. Persistent, he goes back to writing yet another, better song, and so on to the next song-artist combination until at the end, fed up, he fiercely sets off to write one for his very own self, one with mopeds and motorbikes and leather jackets and pipe wrenches and all, along with cheap word puns. This final verse is where Renaud did not forget to parody himself as well, as he has at other times in his career.
Déserteur
Picking up on where a famous anti-military French song of the same name left it decades ago, Renaud mocks the French military and political life, this time with harsher lyrics, as times have changed, pacifism has made its mark and censorship is no longer to be feared so much. The original song (written by Boris Vian) begins "Monsieur le Président, je vous fais une lettre que vous lirez peut-être" (Mr President, I'm writing you a letter which you might perhaps read). Renaud's version rhymes with the original, but goes "Monsieur le Président, je vous fais une bafouille, que vous lirez sûrement si vous avez des couilles". (Mr President, I'm spewing out a letter, which you'll surely read if you have any balls)
Près des autos tamponneuses
A tale of a young lad who meets a girl, fashion-victim at the dodgem cars. Complete with carousel music, with accordion played by Peter White, he describes meeting her, spending a few nice moments with her, then things going horribly wrong when he rams her.
Loulou
An ode presumably to a friend of his, who, although tough and mean when younger, has become older and flabbier.

Tracks 1, 4 and 9 are all used on the live album Visage pâle rencontrer public. Tracks 1, 4 and 6 were included on the compilation The Meilleur of Renaud (75-85). Tracks 1 and 6 were also included on the CD Ma Compil. Tracks 1, 2, 4 and 6 were covered for the tribute album La Bande à Renaud.

== Personnel ==
- Renaud - vocals, backing vocals
- Albert Lee, Michael Landau - guitar
- Neil Stubenhaus - bass
- Randy Kerber, Daryl "The Captain" Dragon, Jean-Philippe Goude - keyboards
- Peter White - guitar; accordion on "Près des autos tamponneuses"
- Carlos Vega, Mike "Pooh" Baird - drums
- Emil Richards, Paulinho Da Costa - percussion
- Marc "Caz" Macino - saxophone, harmonica
- Jean-Louis Roques - accordion
- Alain Ranval, Gérard Prévost, Klaus Blasquiz, Thomas Davidson Noton - backing vocals

== Certifications ==
Region	Certification	Certified units/sales
France (SNEP)	Platinum	1,500,000
