= Paul Personne =

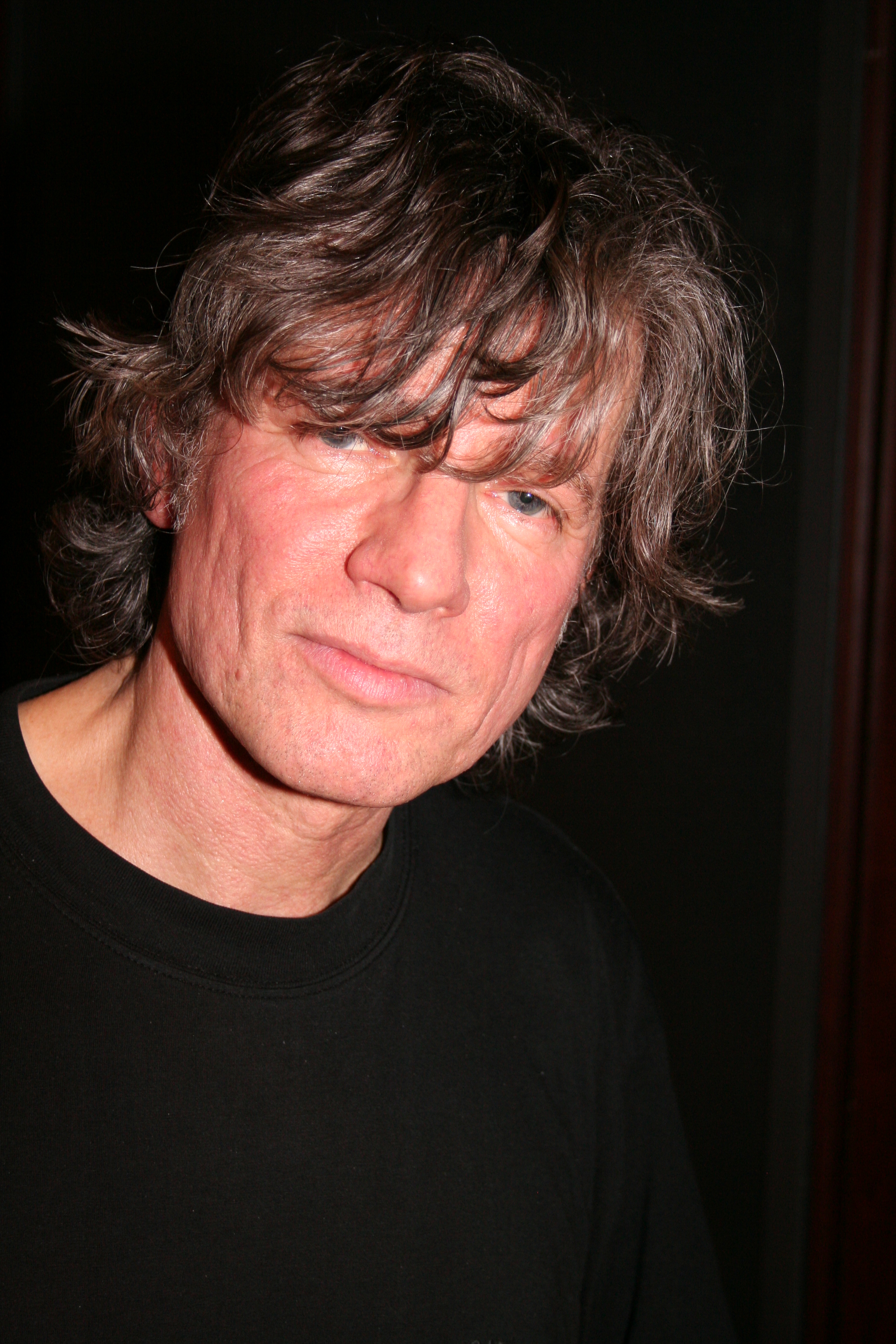
- Paris, February 2007

Background information
- Born: René-Paul Roux; 27 December 1949 (age 76); Argenteuil, France
- Genres: Blues
- Occupation: Musician
- Instrument: Guitar
- Years active: 1966–present
- Website: paulpersonne.fr

Paul Personne (born 27 December 1949) is a French blues singer and guitarist.

== Discography ==
=== Studio albums ===
- Paul Personne (1982, Epic)
- Exclusif (1983, Philips)
- Barjoland (1984, Philips)
- 24/24 (1985, Philips)
- La Chance (1989, Bird)
- Comme À La Maison (1992, Polydor)
- Rêve Sidéral D'Un Naïf Idéal (1994, Polydor)
- Instantanés (1996, Polydor)
- Patchwork Électrique (2000, Polydor)
- Demain Il F'ra Beau (2003, Polydor)
- Coup D'Blues (2003, Polydor)
- Amicalement blues (with Hubert-Félix Thiéfaine) (2007, RCA)
- Personne À L'Ouest, face A (2011)
- Personne À L'Ouest, face B (2011)
- Puzzle 14 (2014)
- Electric rendez-vous (2015)
- Lost in Paris Blues Band (2016)
- Funambule (Ou Tentative De Survie En Milieu Hostile) (2019)

=== Live albums ===
- La Route De La Chance (1990, Bird)
- Route 97 (1997, Polydor)
- Il était une fois la route (2006, XIII Bis Records)

=== Live DVDs ===
- Il était une Fois la route (2006, XIII Bis Records)
- Un 24 juillet aux vieilles charrues (2004, Polydor)

=== Compilation albums ===
- The Best Of (2005, Polydor Canada) 1983–2005

=== Box set ===
- Anthologie 1983–1997 (1997, Polydor)
