= Renaud cante el' Nord =

Studio album by Renaud
- Released: 1993
- Recorded: 1993
- Genre: Chanson
- Length: 46:26
- Label: Virgin
- Producer: Thomas Davidson Noton

Renaud chronology
Marchand de cailloux (1991)	Renaud cante el' Nord (1993)	À la Belle de Mai (1994)

Renaud cante el' Nord is a studio album by Renaud. It consists of songs in the Picard language of the northern French region of Nord-Pas-de-Calais. Some of the songs were composed by Edmond Tanière and Simon Colliez.

== Track listing ==
1. "Tout in haut de ch'terri"
2. "El pinsonnée"
3. "Ch'méneu d’quévaux"
4. "Les Tomates"
5. "Le Tango du cachalot"
6. "Adieu ch'terril d’Rimbert"
7. "Eun'goutt'ed'jus"
8. "M'lampiste"
9. "Y'in a qu'pour li"
10. "Les molettes"
11. "I bot un d'mi"
12. "Dù qu'i sont?"

Track 1 was included on the 2007 compilation The Meilleur of Renaud.
