= Putain de camion =

Studio album by Renaud
- Released: 1988
- Recorded: 1988
- Genre: Rock/Chanson
- Length: 51:32
- Label: Virgin France
- Producer: Ceci-Cela

Renaud chronology
Mistral gagnant (1985)	Putain de camion (1988)	Marchand de cailloux (1991)

Putain de camion is a studio album from French artist Renaud, released in 1988 by Virgin France.

The first song, Jonathan, refers to white South African musician Johnny Clegg who became a friend of Renaud. Rouge-gorge was dedicated to Robert Doisneau and Allongés sous les vagues is a song deriding commercial music. Putain de camion (i.e. Fucking truck) was written after the death of French humorist Coluche, another friend of Renaud, who was killed when his motorcycle collided with a truck.

The cover picture is a papavers bouquet, flowers that Coluche loved.

== Track listing ==
Words by Renaud, music by Renaud where not otherwise mentioned

1. "Jonathan" (5:00), music by Luc Bertin
2. "Il pleut" [It's raining](2:56)
3. "La mère à Titi" [Titi's mum](5:10), music by Franck Langolff
4. "Triviale poursuite" Trivial Pursuit (6:16), music by Franck Langolff
5. "Me jette pas" [Don't chuck me (compare with Brel's Ne me quitte pas)] (4:42),
6. "Rouge-gorge" [Red throat/Robin Red-Breast](2:10)
7. "Allongés sous les vagues" [Lying under the waves] (4:01)
8. "Cent ans" [100 years] (2:54), music by Pierre-Jean Gidon
9. "Socialiste" [Socialist] (3:40), music by Franck Langolff
10. "Petite" [Little one] (4:42)
11. "Chanson dégueulasse" [Disgusting Song] (4:57), music by Jean-Louis Roques
12. "Putain de camion" [Fuckin' Truck] (5:02), music by Franck Langolff

== Songs ==
Allongés sous les vagues (Lying under the waves) is a piece about cheap songs with lamentable lyrics (samples included), which sell nonetheless due to the mass-marketing of lesser quality art. The author is reading/dictating the lyrics of his new number (singing them), along with sarcastic personal comments on the height of the work in progress. In the end, his manager (voiced by Renaud himself) suggests that he buy all his albums himself to get to number 1 of the record charts, then use the resulting sales to pay off the outlay.

Tracks 1, 2, 3, 4, 5, 8, 9, 10 and 12 are all used on the live album Visage pâle rencontrer public . Tracks 3, 4, 5 and 12 were included on the 2007 compilation The Meilleur Of Renaud. Tracks 2 and 3 were covered for the tribute album La Bande à Renaud.
