= Thierry Séchan =

French journalist and writer (1949–2019)

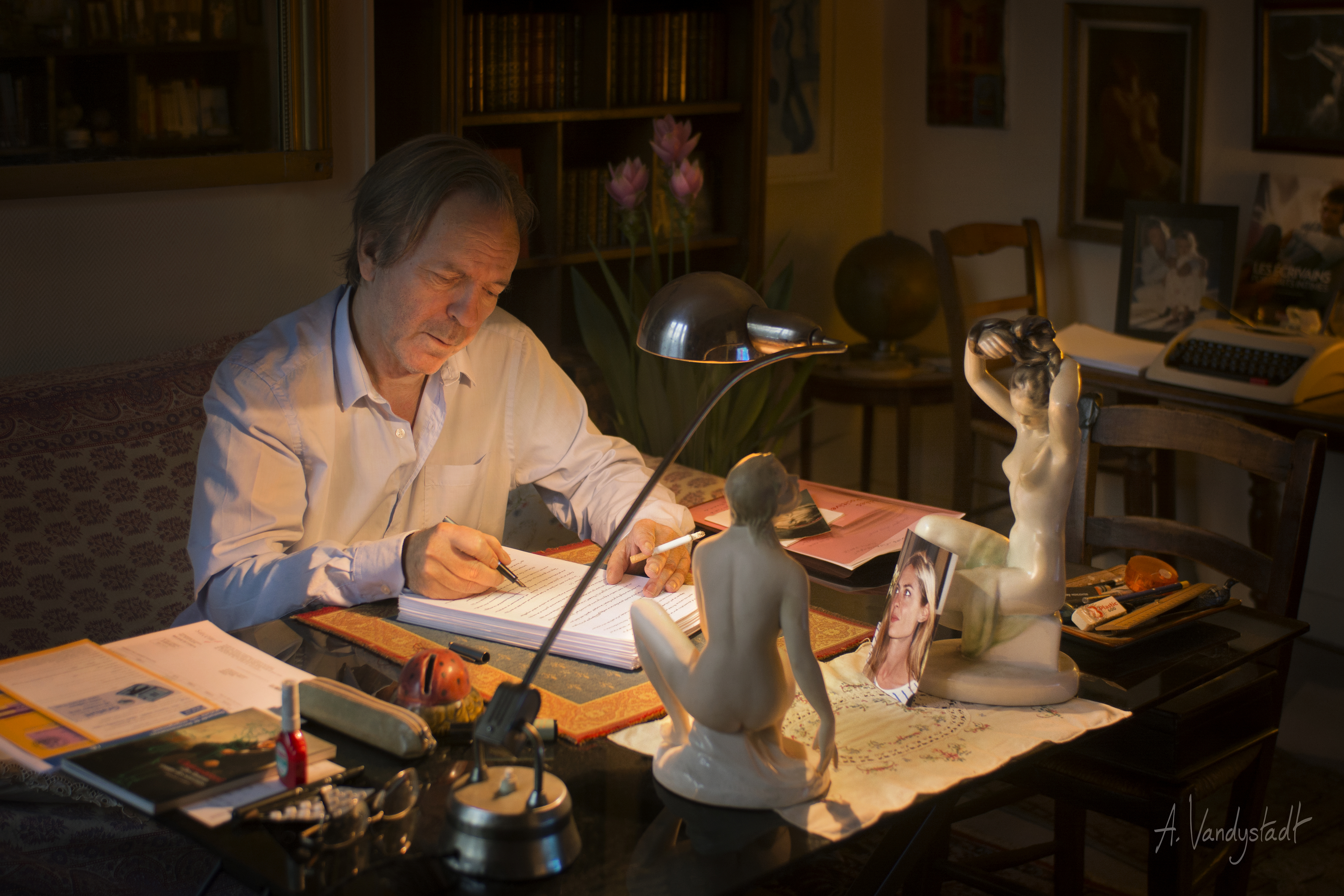
- Séchan in 2016
- Born: 19 September 1949; Paris, France
- Died: 9 January 2019 (aged 69); Paris, France
- Other name: Pierre Calvin
- Occupations: Journalist and writer
- Father: Olivier Séchan
- Relatives: Renaud (brother)

Thierry Séchan (19 September 1949 – 9 January 2019) was a French journalist and writer.

== Biography ==
Séchan was the older brother of French singer Renaud, and the son of writer Olivier Séchan.

Séchan wrote lyrics for many singers, including Julien Clerc, Daniel Lavoie, Les Chats Sauvages, Dan Bigras, and others. His lyrics were very popular in Quebec, and won an award from Society of Composers, Authors and Music Publishers of Canada (SOCAN).

He was a great fan of Leonard Cohen and Étienne Roda-Gil, and wrote pieces on two of the artists' albums.

In 1990, Séchan was one of 250 people to sign Ras L'Front's charter, a document against the far-right National Rally. However, he would receive criticism for his failure to further denounce the party. For example, he had written columns on far-right news sources and declared his admiration for Philippe de Villiers.

On 9 January 2019, Séchan was found dead in his home by his ex-wife. He may have been dead for several days, according to doctors.
