= Benoît Dorémus =

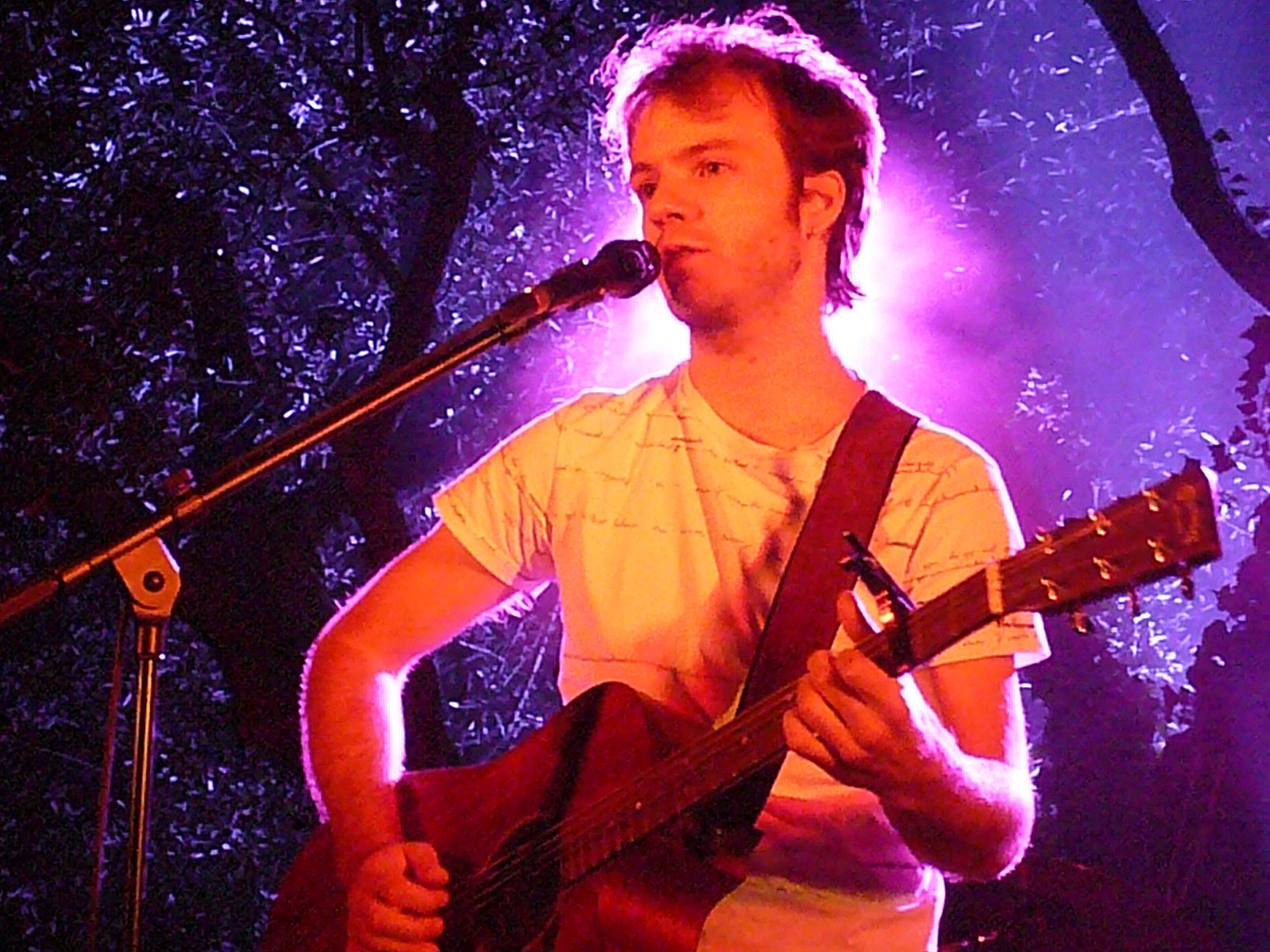
- Benoît Dorémus

Background information
- Born: 20 May 1980 (age 44); Besançon, France
- Occupation: Singer-songwriter
- Website: www.benoitdoremus.fr

Benoît Dorémus (born 20 May 1980, in Besançon) is a French singer-songwriter. He is the fourth of five children and grew up in France.

== Life ==
Dorémus wrote his first pieces of poetry before the age of ten. He also began to learn to play the guitar.

He spent his first years between Metz and Avignon to finally settle down in Paris at 21, after passing a cinematographic Performing Arts bachelor's degree in 2001, and finishing his first novel.

He had his first concerts in 2003 within the very close Parisian fields. His songs, mostly influenced by Eminem or the famous French singer-songwriter Renaud, very popular since the '70s, often describe his bipolarity between music and literature, Philippe Djian being his favourite author concerning the latest. The texts regularly deal with a recurring character called "Benito" or "Adesias Benito", a hardly hidden allegory for himself.

His first album, Pas en parler (French for "[I'd rather] Not talk about it"), came to be known by the professionals, and among them, Renaud in 2005, thanks to the singer Sarclo, who introduced him to him. Renaud enjoyed it and decided to produce it (label EMI). He also did a personal cover of Rien à te mettre (French for Nothing to wear) in his 2006 album Rouge sang.

In October 2007, his last album Jeunesse se passe (French for The Youth is passing by, label Ceci-Celà, EMI Group) received good reviews, especially from the daily newspaper Libération. He also recently appeared on the 15-year-old music TV-Show Taratata

== Discography ==
=== Studio albums ===
- 2004 : Pas en Parler
1. J'apprends le métier
2. Conditionnel
3. Rien à te mettre
4. Ca ne me manquait pas
5. J'écris faux, je chante de la main gauche
6. Les bulles
7. 17 ans
8. Ce que ça fait de la revoir
9. Retour à l'envoyeur
10. Beaupadre
11. Un poison
12. Pas en parler
13. Accordéon pour cinq d'entre elles
14. Je viens du cirque
- 2007 : Jeunesse se passe
1. J'écris faux, je chante de la main gauche
2. Je m'en rappelle pas
3. J'apprends le métier(acte 1)
4. Rien à te mettre
5. L'enfer (acte 2)
6. 17 ans
7. Pas à me plaindre
8. Deux dans mon égotrip(acte 3)
9. Beaupadre
10. Un poison
11. Un arracheur de sacs
12. Les bulles
13. Paris
