= Olivier Séchan =

French writer (1911–2006)

Olivier Séchan (January 14, 1911 – July 7, 2006) was a French writer best known for his children’s books. He was born in Montpellier and died in Paris at the age of 95. He was the son of Louis Séchan and brother of Edmond Séchan.

== Life and work ==
His father Louis Séchan was a professor at the Sorbonne. His mother Isabelle Bost was the granddaughter of a Protestant pastor. He was born in Montpellier where he spent the first twenty years of his life. Moving to Paris, he taught German in the 1930s. During the 1930s, he was a member of the leftist “Groupe Brunet,” which included Claude Cahun and Jean Legrand.

In 1939, he published his first novel Les eaux mortes which was considered "too American". Eight more novels followed, including Les corps ont soif which won the Prix des Deux Magots in 1942. He also won the Prix du Roman d'Aventures in 1951 for his humorous crime novel Vous qui n'avez jamais été tués, written with his friend Igor Maslowski. Several of his novels are set in the Cevennes region.

During World War II, he ran the collaborationist radio station Radio Paris for a period.

He became a director at the publishing firm Hachette. He began writing children's books that were published in the famous Bibliothèque rose and Bibliothèque verte series. He created the recurring characters Luc and Martine, and translated many of the Jennings novels of Anthony Buckeridge. His work for young readers proved very popular.

Séchan spoke fluent English, German and Dutch. He had a wife and six children, among them the novelist Thierry Séchan and the famous singer Renaud Séchan, known simply throughout France as Renaud.

He was buried in Montparnasse.
