= Renan Luce =

French singer-songwriter from Paris (born 1980)

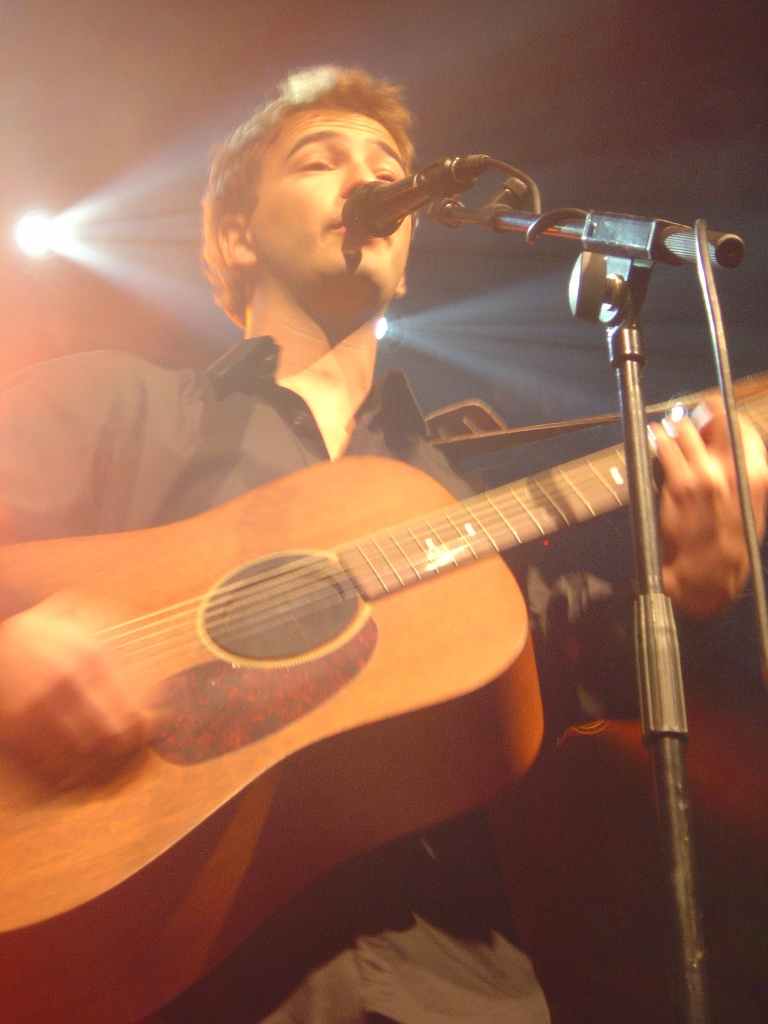
- Luce in 2009

Background information
- Born: 5 March 1980 (age 45); Paris, France
- Origin: French
- Genres: Chanson
- Occupation(s): Singer, songwriter
- Instrument(s): Guitar, vocals
- Website: Official website

Renan Luce (French: [ʁənɑ̃ lys]; born 5 March 1980) is a French singer-songwriter from Paris. His songs are inspired by the 20th-century singer Georges Brassens and depict everyday life with a dose of humour and poetry. He is the voice of Wirt in the French dub of Over the Garden Wall; this is also his only acting role.

== Biography ==
Born in Paris, Luce spent his childhood and adolescence in Plourin-les-Morlaix, Brittany.

He started his musical career singing in a choir with his brother Damien and his sister Claire. Later, he took up classical piano at the conservatory of Brest and then at Saint-Brieuc. He gave up the piano for the saxophone and taught himself the guitar, on which he composed his first songs.

After two years of preparatory classes in Rennes, where he performed in bars and at a few festivals (e.g., as a support act for Matmatah), he was admitted to the Toulouse Business School.

== Musical career ==
Luce has been successful in France with songs like "Les Voisines" and "La Lettre".

In September 2006 Luce released his first album, Repenti, which includes 13 tracks + 3 live versions. The album sold more than 800,000 copies.

In October 2009, Luce released his second studio album, Le Clan des Miros, which includes the song "On n'est pas à une bêtise prês" from the original soundtrack of the movie Le petit Nicolas.

His third album, D'Une Tonne a Un Tout Petit Poids, was released in 2014.

=== Early days ===
After three years of study at Toulouse, Luce moved to Paris and soon decided to focus exclusively on song writing and performing. He quickly found his publisher Olivier Lefebvre (Universal Publishing) and his manager, Jeff Genie, who set him up for several months of concerts at the theater Méry (Place de Clichy). Among his early followers are the singers Renaud and Bénabar, and many artistic directors. Luce signed a record deal with Barclay in late 2005.

Luce got exposure through several festivals (Francofolies de La Rochelle, Montauban So Sing) and Bénabar had him play as support act at the Paris Zénith on 7 June 2006. He is often invited by other artists, having opened the show for Maxime Le Forestier, Clarks, Jeanne Cherhal, Thomas Fersen amongst others.

=== Repenti (2005–2009) ===
His first album, Repenti (Repentant), was released in September 2006. It was directed by Jean-Louis Pierot and recorded at Studio Manor (in Landes), Studio de la Seine (Paris) and Studio ICP (Brussels). Luce was on the road until spring 2008, touring French speaking destinations, performing in front of nearly 200,000 spectators. He played four times in Quebec during 2007. Over a period of 18 months, all his concerts in Paris were fully booked: Café de la danse, Trianon, La Cigale, and Olympia Grand Rex. Bernard Chereze of France Inter radio station added Luce to his playlist long before other stations picked him up. For several months, Luce had three singles simultaneously in the French rankings (Yacast): "The Letter", "The Neighbours", and "The Repentant".

His album Repenti was certified platinum in December 2007, with more than 250,000 copies sold. In August 2009, the album reached 800,000 copies sold. It went platinum in Belgium in April 2008, with 40,000 copies sold.

Nominated in three categories, this album won two prizes at Victoires de la Musique 2008: Album Revelation of the Year and Stage Revelation of the Year.

He participated in the show Enfoirés in 2009, from 21 to 26 January 2009 at the Palais Omnisports de Paris-Bercy.

At the Victoires de la Musique 2009, he was nominated for Song of the Year with "Repenti". The victory went to Thomas Dutronc.

=== Clan Des Miros (2009–2014) ===
12 October 2009, his second album, The Clan Des Miros, was released. Its singles were "La Fille de la Bande" and "On n'est pas à une bêtise près", which was used for the film Le Petit Nicolas, and Nantes.

Luce began a tour on 1 October 2009 which extended into 2010, including concerts at La Cigale in Paris in October, three in Olympia (fully booked) from 10 to 12 May 2010 and some time in Quebec.

Following one of his concerts at the Olympia, he received a double platinum album for the sale of 230,000 albums in France (and received a gold disk in Belgium).

=== D'Une Tonne À Un Tout Petit Poids (2014–present) ===
On 7 April 2014, after a three-year break, Luce brought out a new album, D'Une Tonne À Un Tout Petit Poids ("From a Ton to a Very Small Weight"). This album was produced with the Swede Peter von Poehl. On 10 February 2014, a single from the album was released: "Appelle Quand Tu Te Réveilles" ("Call Me When You Wake Up").

== Personal life ==
Luce was married to Lolita Séchan, the daughter of Renaud. Their only child Héloïse was born on 3 August 2011. They separated in 2016.

== Discography ==
=== Albums ===
Year	Album	Peak positions			Notes
Year	Album	FRA	BEL (Wa)	SWI	Notes
2006	Repenti	2	2	31	Track list: 1. "Les voisines" 2. "Repenti"; 3. "Le Lacrymal Circus"; 4. "Je suis une feuille" 5. "La lettre" 6. "Chien mouillé" 7. "Monsieur Marcel"; 8. "24h01" 9. "Camelote"; 10. "Mes racines" 11. "I Was Here"; 12. "Nuit blanche" 13. "L'iris et la rose" 14. "Les voisines" (live); 15. "Monsieur Marcel" (live); 16. "La lettre" (live)
2009	Le Clan des Miros	1	2	19	Track list: 1. "Le clan des Miros"; 2. "La fille de la bande" 3. "Les gens sont fous" 4. "Nantes"; 5. "Rue de l’oiseau lyre" 6. "Chez toi" 7. "Ridicule"; 8. "Grand-père"; 9. "Grand-père II"; 10. "On n'est pas à une bêtise près" 11. "Aux timides anonymes" 12. "Femme à lunettes"
2014	D'une tonne à un tout petit poids	17	7	62	Track list: 1. "Voyager" (4:10); 2. "La boîte" (3:14); 3. "Appelle quand tu te réveilles" (3:56); 4. "J'habitais là" (3:37); 5. "Au téléphone avec maman" (3:11); 6. "Réponse à tout" (4:36); 7. "Amoureux d'une flic" (3:48); 8. "Damoclès" (3:10); 9. "Les secrets chuchotés" (4:13); 10. "Courage" (3:15)
2019	Renan Luce	38	15	60	

=== Singles ===
- 2006: "Les Voisines"
- 2007: "La Lettre et Lacrymal Circus"
- 2008: "Repenti"
- 2008: "Monsieur Marcel" (new version)
- 2009: "La Fille de la bande"
- 2009: "On n'est pas à une bêtise près"
- 2010: "Nantes"
- 2014; "D'une tonne à un tout petit poids"
