= Lolita Séchan =

French writer

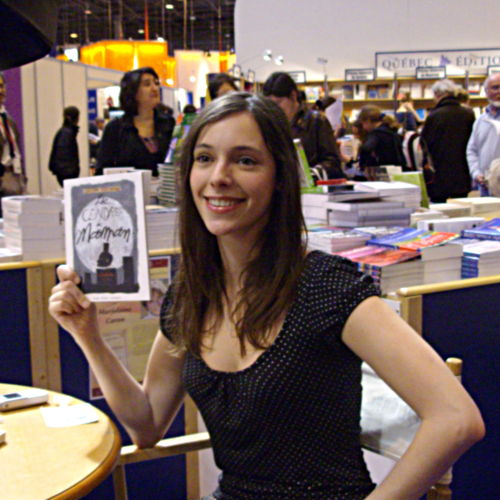

Lolita Séchan is a French writer. She writes children's books as well as comic books; she published her first graphic novel Les Brumes de Sapa at the age of 36.

== Personal life ==
She is the daughter of French singer, songwriter Renaud. She was married to singer songwriter Renan Luce.
