= Renaud =

French singer and actor (born 1952)

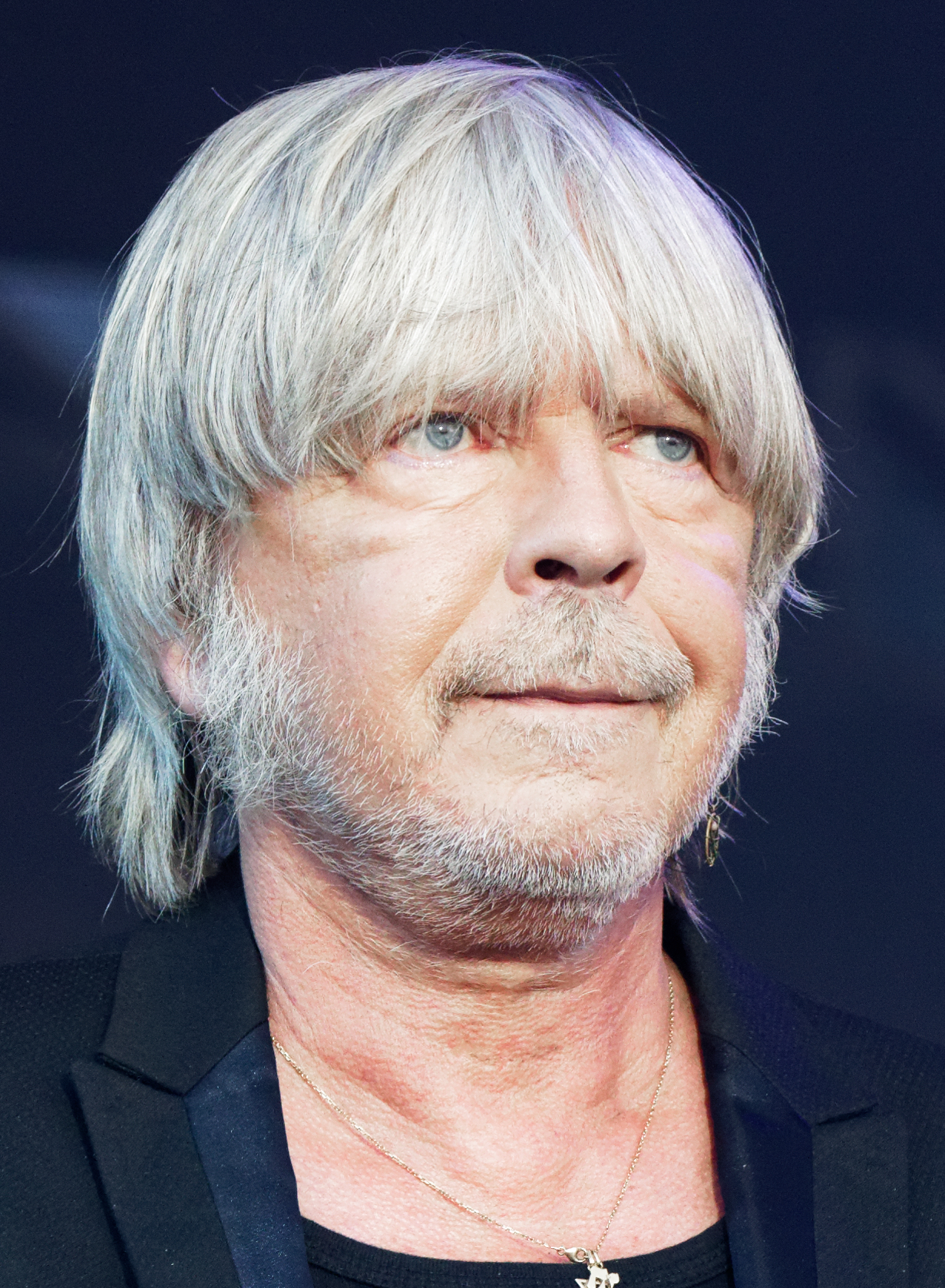
- Renaud in 2017

Background information
- Born: Renaud Pierre Manuel Séchan; 11 May 1952 (age 74); 15th arrondissement, Paris, France
- Origin: Paris
- Genres: Chanson; pop rock; rock
- Occupations: Musician; singer; songwriter; actor
- Instrument: Guitar
- Years active: 1975–present
- Labels: Polydor (1975–1983); Virgin
- Website: www.renaud-lesite.fr

Renaud Pierre Manuel Séchan (French pronunciation: [ʁəno pjɛʁ manɥɛl seʃɑ̃]; born 11 May 1952 in Paris), known as Renaud, is a French musician, singer, songwriter and actor.

With twenty-six albums to his credit, selling nearly twenty million copies, he is one of France's most popular singers. Several of his songs are popular classics in France, including the sea tale "Dès que le vent soufflera", the irreverent "Laisse béton", the ballad "Morgane de toi" and the nostalgic "Mistral gagnant". His songs, with their slang lyrics and idiosyncratic Parisian phrasing, deal with both light and serious themes, alternating humor, emotion, and social criticism.

Although he enjoyed great success in France in the 1970s, 1980s and 1990s, his career took a roller-coaster ride thereafter, with the singer regularly falling victim to depression and alcoholism, ailments he recounts in various songs. His work remains little known outside the French-speaking world.

He also appeared in several films, including Claude Berri's adaptation of Germinal in 1993.

Although his political stance has provoked controversy, he has nicknamed himself "le chanteur énervant" (the irritating singer), due to his many commitments to causes such as human rights, ecology, and anti-militarism, which are frequently reflected in his songs.

== Career ==
=== Early work ===
As a child, Renaud appeared as an extra in the film The Red Balloon (1956). Fresh out of school, his original vocation was to become an actor. By chance he met the actor Patrick Dewaere and was invited to join the company of the comedy theatre Café de la Gare, which had recently been founded by Patrick Dewaere, Coluche, and Miou-Miou. Renaud played some supporting roles in television productions, but turned away from acting as his singing career progressed.

His early work is characterized by a volatile temperament, innovative use of French, and edgy, dark, leftist social and political themes. Raised in an educated milieu, the son of an intellectual, Renaud adopted the looks and attitude of working-class youth in the 1970s, and reflected this in his lyrics. A recurrent theme is his disgust for the average French person with petit-bourgeois preoccupations and right-wing leanings (see beauf). His music focuses on the disparity between classes, the abuse of political power, overbearing authority and disgust for the military and the police, with rare glimpses of tenderness for his fellow humans, the planet earth, and art.

=== Middle period ===
In 1985, in a concert in Moscow, in what was an orchestrated gesture, roughly one third of the spectators upped and left the concert hall when he sang the anti-militarist "Déserteur". In the late 1980s and the 1990s, Renaud's work was distinguished by "softer" subjects such as his then-wife Dominique, his daughter Lolita and his friends, as well as comedian and singer Coluche for whom he wrote the tribute "Putain de camion" ("Bloody Lorry") after Coluche's death in a road accident. He has also ventured into regional music and language, such as the language of Marseille in La Belle de Mai, the north with Renaud cante el' Nord and even Corsican polyphonics in "Lolito lolita".

In 1992, he financially helped resurrect the defunct satirical weekly Charlie Hebdo and wrote a column titled Renaud bille en tête for a couple of years. His column appeared again in 1995–1996, retitled Envoyé spécial chez moi. In 2006, he published Les Bobos, as a satire on the Parisian lower bourgeoisie.

In 1993, he came back to acting by playing the leading part of Étienne Lantier in the film Germinal directed by Claude Berri.

=== Resurgence ===
After an unproductive period marked by alcoholism, he made a significant comeback with his 2002 album Boucan d'enfer. That album's hit was "Manhattan-Kaboul", a duo with Axelle Red which tackled current issues by drawing a parallel between a victim of the 9-11 attacks in New York and an Afghan girl, both caught up in a war they don't understand.

In 2009 Renaud released Molly Malone – Balade irlandaise, an album of Irish ballads. Produced by ex-Boomtown Rats bassist Pete Briquette, the album was commercially successful (certified double-platinum in just over a month).

In 2014, a collective of 15 artists released a tribute album containing 14 tracks covers of his songs under the title La Bande à Renaud.

On 26 January 2016, on his website, Renaud released "Toujours debout", the first track from his new studio album yet to be released. On the same day, he announced on the French public radio station France Inter the title of his new studio album: Toujours debout. The video "Toujours debout" was released on 26 February 2016. On 8 April 2016, Renaud released a studio album, Toujours debout but oddly sold under the simple title Renaud.

== Personal life ==
Renaud was born at 03:30 in the 15th arrondissement of Paris, ten minutes after his brother David. His mother chose the name Renaud because her mother and grandmother would sing La complainte du Roi Renaud (The Lament of King Renaud) to her, and she found it so sad that she would cry each time she heard it.

His father Olivier Séchan, born to a Protestant Languedoc family from the Cévennes and Montpellier, was a novelist and children's writer. He taught German in a secondary school in Paris. The director Edmond Séchan is his uncle. His grandfather was the scholar and Hellenist Louis Séchan, who taught at the Sorbonne. His ancestors were pastors. His mother is the daughter of a coalminer from the Nord-Pas-de-Calais region. Renaud dedicated part of his work to his familial roots, singing traditional songs in the regional Picard language and playing the part of Étienne Lantier in Germinal, a film based on the famous Émile Zola novel.

He is the sixth of eight children born to his father. He has two brothers: David, his fraternal twin, and the writer Thierry Sechan, as well as two sisters. He also has two half-sisters and a half-brother, children of his father and his first wife.

During his childhood, Renaud lived in the 14th arrondissement of Paris with his paternal grandparents in a building reserved for teachers by the RIVP. Among seven people, they shared two rooms. Soon his family was able to move to a large apartment, with his father being a teacher and his grandfather being a celebrated academic.

Between ten and twelve years old, he wrote novels on his father's typewriter and discovered Yé-yé and the Beatles.

In August 2005, Renaud married Romane Serda, the mother of his son Malone. In 2007, he announced to the press his intention to move his family to London, citing a love for British society and expressing disillusionment at the current state of France. In 2009 Renaud's daughter, writer Lolita Séchan, married French acoustic singer-songwriter Renan Luce.

In September 2011, Romane divorced Renaud on the account of his alcoholism and depression.

== Discography ==
=== Studio albums ===
| Year | Album | Peak positions | | | Notes |
| Year | Album | FR | BEL (Wa) | SWI | Notes |
|---|---|---|---|---|---|
| 1975 | Amoureux de Paname (Polydor) | | | – | |
| 1977 | Laisse béton (Polydor) | | | – | |
| 1979 | Ma gonzesse (Polydor) | | | – | |
| 1980 | Marche à l'ombre (Polydor) | | | – | |
| 1981 | Le Retour de Gérard Lambert (Polydor) | | | – | |
| 1983 | Morgane de toi (Polydor) | | | – | Sold over 1,500,000 copies |
| 1985 | Mistral gagnant (Virgin) | | | – | Sold over 2,000,000 copies; it was Renaud's most successful album until 2002's Boucan d'enfer |
| 1988 | Putain de camion (Virgin) | | | – | |
| 1991 | Marchand de cailloux (Virgin) | | | – | |
| 1992 | Renaud cante el' Nord (Virgin) | | | – | Traditional folk songs from the north of France |
| 1994 | À la Belle de Mai (Virgin) | | | – | |
| 1996 | Renaud chante Brassens (Virgin) | 22 | 10 | – | Interpretation of songs by Georges Brassens |
| 2002 | Boucan d'enfer (Virgin) | 1 | 1 | 1 | Sold over 2,200,000 copies the most successful Renaud album to date |
| 2006 | Rouge Sang (EMI) | 1 | 1 | 3 | |
| 2009 | Molly Malone – Balade irlandaise (EMI) | 1 | 4 | 34 | |
| 2016 | Renaud (Parlophone, Warner Music) | 1 | 1 | 2 | |
| 2019 | Les mômes et les enfants d'abord (Parlophone, Warner Music) | 1 | 1 | 3 | |
| 2022 | Métèque (Parlophone, Warner) | 1 | 1 | 5 | |
| 2023 | Dans mes cordes (Parlophone, Warner) | 10 | 10 | – | |

=== Live albums ===
- 1980: Bobino (Polydor)
- 1981: Le P'tit bal du samedi soir et autres chansons réalistes (Polydor)
- 1982: Un Olympia pour moi tout seul (Polydor)
- 1989: Visage pâle rencontrer public (Virgin)

| Year | Album | Peak positions | | | Notes |
| Year | Album | FR | BEL (Wa) | SUI | Notes |
|---|---|---|---|---|---|
| 1996 | Paris-Province: Aller / Retour (Virgin) | 29 | 32 | – | |
| 2003 | Tournée d'enfer (EMI) | 16 | 38 | – | |
| 2007 | Tournée Rouge Sang - Paris Bercy + Hexagone (Ceci-Celà) | 16 | 38 | – | |
| 2025 | Live à La Cigale (Parlophone) | 11 | – | – | |

=== Compilations ===
| Year | Album | Peak positions | | | Notes |
| Year | Album | FR | BEL (Wa) | SUI | Notes |
|---|---|---|---|---|---|
| 1995 | Les Introuvables | – | 29 | – | A collection of rarities |
| 1995 | Ma compil | – | 36 | – | |
| 1995 | 85-95 | – | 6 | – | |
| 1995 | The Meilleur of Renaud 75-85 | – | 11 | – | |
| 1995 | The Very Meilleur of Renaud 1975/1995 | – | 14 | – | |
| 2000 | L'absolutely meilleur of Renaud | – | 29 | – | |
| 2006 | Les 100 plus belles Chansons 1975-1983 | – | 76 | – | |
| 2006 | Les 100 plus belles Chansons 1985-2006 | – | 2 | – | |
| 2011 | Le plein de super! | 15 | 33 | – | 3CD Best Of |
| 2012 | Intégrale 2012 | 76 | 200 | – | |
| 2014 | Les 50 plus belles chansons | 57 | 59 | – | |
| 2014 | Les 100 plus belles chansons 1985-2006 (5 CDs) | 185 | 2 | – | |
| 2020 | L'album de sa vie | 134 | 81 | – | |
| 2020 | The totale of la bande à Renaud | 38 | 110 | 6 | 2 CD tribute to Renaud by Various Artists |
| 2021 | Putain de Best Of! | 16 | – | – | 3 CD digipack |

=== Singles ===
(Selective)

| Year | Single | Peak positions | | | | Album |
| Year | Single | FR | BEL (Fl) | BEL (Wa) | SUI | Album |
|---|---|---|---|---|---|---|
| 1986 | "Miss Maggie" | 13 | – | – | – | Mistral gagnant |
| 1991 | "Marchand de cailloux" | 25 | – | – | – | Marchand de cailloux |
| 1992 | "P'tit voleur" | 35 | – | – | – | Marchand de cailloux |
| 1992 | "La ballade nord-irlandaise" | 44 | – | – | – | Marchand de cailloux |
| 2002 | "Docteur Renaud, Mister Renard" | 23 | – | 6 (Ultratip) | – | Boucan d'enfer |
| 2002 | "Manhattan-Kaboul" (with Axelle Red) | 2 | 34 | 4 | 37 | Boucan d'enfer |
| 2003 | "Coeur perdu" | 91 | – | 11 (Ultratip) | – | Boucan d'enfer |
| 2005 | "Anaïs Nin (Romane Serda feat. Renaud) | 12 | – | 31 | 61 | |
| 2005 | "Dans la jungle" | 31 | – | 19 | 64 | Rouge Sang |
| 2006 | "Les bobos" | 8 | – | 16 | 51 | Rouge Sang |
| 2006 | "Arrêter la clope!" | 31 | – | 3 (Ultratip) | – | Rouge Sang |
| 2009 | "Vagabonds" | – | – | 19 (Ultratip) | – | Molly Malone – Balade irlandaise |
| 2011 | "La liberté en cavale" (Dr. Tom) | – | – | 30 (Ultratip) | – | |
| 2012 | "Mistral gagnant" | 102 | – | – | – | Mistral gagnant |
| 2015 | "Ta batterie" | 36 | – | – | – | |
| 2016 | "Toujours debout" | 1 | – | 2 | 48 | |

== Filmography ==
=== Film ===
- The Red Balloon (1956) as Kid in red
- Elle voit des nains partout ! (1982) as Tarzan (cameo)
- Germinal (1993) as Étienne Lantier
- Crime Spree (2003) as Zéro

=== Television ===
- Madame Ex, by Michel Wyn (TV movie, 1977)
- Brigades des mineurs, by Michel Wyn (TV series, 1 episode, 1977)
- Au plaisir de Dieu, by Roland Mazoyer (TV miniseries, 1977)
- Un juge, un flic, by Denys de La Patellière (TV series, 1 episode, 1977)

== Awards ==
- 1993: Traditional music album of the year award for "Renaud cante el' Nord"
- 2001: Lifetime achievement award
- 2003: Three awards given for: Album of the Year, Artist of the Year, and Song of the Year (for Manhattan-Kaboul with Axelle Red)

== See also ==
- La Bande à Renaud

| Preceded by Gérald de Palmas | Victoires de la Musique; Male group or artist of the year 2003 | Succeeded by Calogero |
