= La Bande à Renaud =

Tribute albums

Compilation album by Various artists
- Released: 9 June 2014
- Genre: French music
- Label: Mercury / Universal Music

Singles from La Bande à Renaud
- 1. "Mistral gagnant (Cœur de Pirate)" Released: 28 April 2014; 2. "Dès que le vent soufflera" Released: 28 April 2014

La Bande à Renaud is a series of two tribute albums to French singer Renaud, consisting of songs of his performed by various other artists. The albums were released in June and October 2014, respectively.

== La Bande à Renaud ==
The initial album was released on Mercury / Universal Music containing 14 songs interpreted by 15 artists. The musical project was supervised by Renaud himself, assisted by Dominique Blanc-Francard and Alain Lanty. It reached the top of SNEP, the official French Albums Chart in its first week of release.

There were two official released singles from the single. The track "Mistral gagnant" was a major release single that appeared in the SNEP French Singles Chart and in Ultratop Belgian (Wallonia) Charts. Another official single was the collective singing "Dès que le vent soufflera". It charted in France and appeared in Belgium's Ultratipchart. Many other tracks appeared briefly in the SNEP charts.

The album shows photos of artists photographed by Barbara d'Alessandri wearing a red bandana, Renaud's signature paraphernalia. The album cover also shows a big "R" logo made of a red bandana.

=== Track list ===
Track #	Song title	Performing artist	Length
1.	"Manu"	Jean-Louis Aubert	2:49
2.	"Mistral gagnant"	Cœur de Pirate	3:04
3.	"La pêche à la ligne"	Bénabar	3:08
4.	"Laisse béton"	Disiz	2:25
5.	"Il pleut"	Élodie Frégé	2:53
6.	"Chanson pour Pierrot"	Raphaël	3:07
7.	"Hexagone"	Nicola Sirkis (from group Indochine)	4:58
8.	"Deuxième génération"	Benjamin Biolay	4:06
9.	"La ballade nord-irlandaise"	Nolwenn Leroy	3:56
10.	"En cloque"	Hubert-Félix Thiéfaine	3:13
11.	"C'est quand qu’on va où?"	Carla Bruni	4:00
12.	"Je suis une bande de jeunes"	Renan Luce, Alexis HK & Benoît Dorémus	3:10
13.	"La médaille"	Grand Corps Malade	2:32
14.	"Dès que le vent soufflera"	La bande à Renaud (collégiale) (the collective of artists)	4:10

== La Band à Renaud Volume 2 ==
La Bande à Renaud Volume 2

Compilation album by Various artists
- Released: 27 October 2014
- Genre: French music
- Label: Mercury / Universal Music

After the great success of the initial album, a second album was released on 27 October 2014 containing 15 more tracks by 16 artists.

=== Track list ===
Track #	Song title	Performing artist	Length
1.	"Morts les enfants"	Bernard Lavilliers	3:44
2.	"Manhattan-Kaboul"	Thomas Dutronc & Nikki Yanofsky	3:35
3.	"Miss Maggie"	Benjamin Biolay	3:39
4.	"Morgane de toi (amoureux de toi)"	Vincent Lindon	4:56
5.	"Marche à l’ombre"	Emmanuelle Seigner	3:21
6.	"Son bleu"	Calogero	4:16
7.	"Ma gonzesse"	Arno	4:33
8.	"P'tite conne"	Nicola Sirkis	3:21
9.	"La mère à Titi"	Louane	4:11
10.	"Mon H.L.M"	Arthur H	5:19
11.	"Adieu minette"	Olivia Ruiz	4:27
12.	"La blanche"	Benjamin Siksou	4:11
13.	"It Is Not Because You Are"	Emily Loizeau	3:14
14.	"Où c’est qu’j’ai mis mon flingue"	Renan Luce	4:01
15.	"J’ai la vie qui m’pique les yeux"	Nolwenn Leroy	3:25

== Charts ==
La Bande à Renaud

Chart (2014)	Peak position
Ultratop (Belgian (Flanders) Albums Chart)	59
Ultratop (Belgian (Wallonia) Albums Chart)	1
SNEP (French Albums Chart)	1
(Swiss Albums Chart)	5

La Bande à Renaud Volume 2

Chart (2014)	Peak position
Ultratop (Belgian (Wallonia) Albums Chart)	2
SNEP (French Albums Chart)	2
(Swiss Albums Chart)	6

=== Charting singles from the album ===
La Bande à Renaud

Year	Renaud song	Credited performer(s)	Peak positions		Ref
Year	Renaud song	Credited performer(s)	FRA	BEL (Wa)	Ref
2014	"Mistral gagnant"	Cœur de Pirate	13	17	
2014	"Dès que le vent soufflera"	La bande à Renaud (collégiale)	96	17 (Ultratip)	
2014	"Il pleut"	Élodie Frégé	67	37 (Ultratip)	
2014	"En cloque"	Hubert-Félix Thiéfaine	114	–	
2014	"Laisse béton"	Disiz	115	–	
2014	"La ballade nord-irlandaise"	Nolwenn Leroy	142	–	
2014	"Manu"	Jean-Louis Aubert	159	–	
2014	"Hexagone"	Nicola Sirkis	198	–	
