= Salto (streaming service) =

French subscription video streaming service

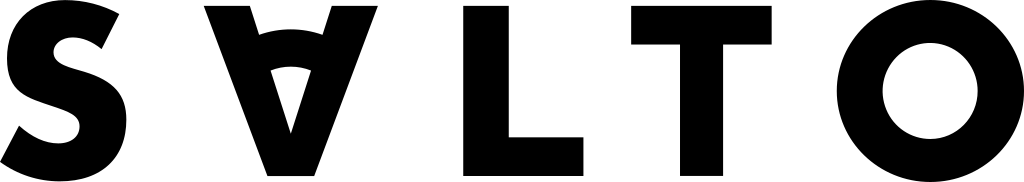
- Company type: Joint venture
- Website type: OTT video streaming platform
- Available in: French
- Dissolved: March 27, 2023; 3 years ago
- Headquarters: Boulogne-Billancourt, Île-de-France, {{{location_country}}}
- Country of origin: France
- Area served: France
- Owners: France Télévisions (33%); TF1 Group (33%); Groupe M6 (33%)
- Website: salto.fr at the Wayback Machine (archived January 28, 2023)
- Registration: Required
- Users: ▲800 000 (as of January 18, 2023)
- Launched: October 20, 2020; 5 years ago

Salto (stylized as SⱯLTO) was a French subscription streaming service. A joint venture between France Télévisions, the TF1 Group and the Groupe M6, it was launched on October 20, 2020, and closed on March 27, 2023.

Salto offered a library of films and television series from the three groups respective television networks, as well as exclusive programming. It also offered live access to their television networks, a catch-up service, and a selection of programs in advanced access before their original broadcast. A selection of films from third-party distributors was also available on the service.

In February 2023, in a joint press release, the TF1, M6 and France Télévisions groups announced their intention to end the platform, following its difficulty in attracting subscribers. Salto closed on March 27, 2023.

== History ==
In June 2018, France Télévisions, the TF1 Group and the Groupe M6 announced the creation of a joint streaming service as a response to the many American services available in France, like Netflix and Amazon Prime Video. This had a similar aim to the initial versions of Hulu in the United States (Disney, NBCUniversal and Fox) and BritBox in the United Kingdom (BBC and ITV). This is mainly due to trends with younger generations shunning terrestrial TV in favor of streaming services, with traditional TV fearing that they have no choice but to adapt in the rapidly changing television market.

== Exclusive programming ==
A selection of Salto's exclusives series were later broadcast on France Télévisions, the TF1 Group or the Groupe M6 respective television networks.

- A Confession
- A Million Little Things (seasons 1–4)
- A Very British Scandal
- All American (seasons 1–5) (Note: Following the service closure, the fifth season of All American was only broadcast from episodes 1 to 10.)
- All American: Homecoming (seasons 1–2) (Note: Following the service closure, the second season of All American: Homecoming was only broadcast from episodes 1 to 10.)
- And Just Like That... (season 1)
- Beecham House
- Bel-Air (season 1)
- Bull (season 6)
- Clarice
- Callboys
- C'est comme ça que je t'aime
- Charmed (seasons 1-3 - SVOD exclusive only, broadcast on Syfy)
- Chucky (seasons 1–2)
- The Cry
- Cryptid
- Departure
- Double Vie
- Evil (seasons 1–3)
- Exit
- Face to Face
- Fantasy Island (season 1)
- Fargo (season 4)
- Flesh and Blood
- The Flight Attendant (season 1 - SVOD exclusive only, broadcast on Warner TV)
- Four Weddings and a Funeral
- Grand Hotel
- The Grave
- The Hunting
- Intelligence
- Katy Keene
- Looking for Alaska
- Manifest (season 2)
- Monsterland
- Nancy Drew (seasons 1–2)
- On Becoming a God in Central Florida
- Pretty Little Liars: The Perfectionists
- Quartier des Banques
- Quiz
- The Secrets She Keeps
- Sherlock in Russia
- The Sister
- Small Axe
- Sissi (seasons 1–2)
- Superman & Lois (seasons 1–2)
- Stargirl (season 1 - SVOD exclusive only, broadcast on Warner TV)
- The Thing About Pam
- Ulven kommer
- Why Women Kill (season 2)
- Yellowstone (seasons 1–5) (Note: Following the service closure, the fifth season of Yellowstone was only broadcast from episodes 1 to 8.)

== TV channels ==
France Télévisions

- France 2
- France 3
- France 4
- France 5
- France Info
- Culturebox
- France.tv Slash
- Okoo

TF1 Group

- TF1
- TMC
- TFX
- TF1 Séries Films
- LCI
- TV Breizh
- Ushuaïa TV
- Histoire TV
- TFOU Max

Groupe M6

- M6
- W9
- Gulli / Gulli Max
- 6ter
- Téva
- Paris Première
- TiJi
- Canal J

Channels from third-party

- NRJ 12
- Chérie 25
- La Chaîne L'Équipe
- La Chaîne parlementaire (LCP − AN / Public Sénat)
- TV5Monde
- Arte France
