= Magali Lunel =

French television journalist

- Born: 6 January 1975 (age 51); Paris, France
- Occupation: Television journalist
- Employer(s): TF1; LCI

Magali Lunel (born January 6, 1975) is a French television journalist and a tv personality. Lunel has anchored for several rolling news channels in France, including LCI and Infosport. Her amiability and attractiveness brought her to national attention. In May 2008, TF1, France's most widely viewed channel, announced that she would take over as host of the popular tv show Le Droit de Savoir from Charles Villeneuve. Acknowledging a fall in audience figures, the then TF1 President Nonce Paolini said that he hoped the re-launch of the show would act as a boost to the channel's audience figures.
