= TV Breizh =

- Type: National Private Generalist
- Country: France
- Broadcast area: France; Belgium; Luxembourg; Monaco; Switzerland

Programming
- Languages: French; Breton
- Picture format: 1080i HDTV (downscaled to 16:9 576i for the SDTV feed)

Ownership
- Owner: TF1 Group
- Sister channels: TF1; TMC; TFX; TF1 Séries Films; LCI; Histoire TV; Ushuaïa TV

History
- Launched: 1 September 2000

Links
- Website: TV-Breizh.fr

TV Breizh (Breizh is Breton for Brittany) is a French pay television channel owned by Groupe TF1, which was initially set as a regional station for the Brittany region, but has since lost its initial purpose and became largely a channel dedicated to reruns of French, American and British series, mostly crime procedurals.

== History ==
=== Context of its creation ===
At local level, the city of Lorient experienced a period of economic reconversion from the 1990s with the reduction in the importance of its maritime activities, and the municipality sought to attract investment from outside the city to develop new activities. The gradual departure of the French Navy enabled the city to recover the port enclosure district.

In terms of the media landscape, the place of the Breton language remains limited on public television in Brittany, which in fact has a monopoly. In 2000, France 3 Bretagne thus broadcast 1 hour 45 minutes weekly of programs in Breton, and TV Rennes 15 minutes monthly. This is more represented on radio, and transmitters such as Radio Kerne or Arvorig FM, both created in 1998, give a large place to the Breton language and culture.

At the same time Patrick Le Lay, then CEO of TF1, wanted to launch a general-interest channel broadcasting primarily in Breton for fiction and children's programmes, for two to three hours a day, and whose editorial line would cover the news of the five Breton departments.

=== Creation ===
The choice of location obeyed several constraints, the promoters wanting a central city in Brittany, which excluded Brest, Rennes and Nantes from the start. The mayor of Carhaix, Christian Troadec, tried to bring it to his commune; finally the choice is oriented between Vannes and Lorient. Jean-Louis Bouillières, the director of the cultural service of this city, got wind of the project quite early and managed to organize a meeting between Patrick Le Lay and Jean-Yves Le Drian, then mayor of the city. Lorient was finally chosen because of its regular transport lines to Paris, such as its TGV station and its airport.

The starting capital of 100 million francs is secured by calling on an arrangement bringing together local, national and international players. François Pinault via his Artemis holding company owns 27% of it, followed by TF1 with 22%, Crédit Agricole de Bretagne with 15%, the Jean-Claude Darmon group with 6% and the local industrialist René Ruello via Panavi Holding Production. with 4%. Rupert Murdoch via News International PLC and Silvio Berlusconi via Mediaset Investment each own 13% of the channel. The initial annual budget is between 75 and 80 million francs; its advertising management, entrusted to TF1, aims for receipts of 22 to 25 million francs the first year, and aims for a balance for 2004-2005.

Several locations have been studied for the installation of TV Breizh facilities. The citadel of Port-Louis was considered for a time, but in the end the harbor enclosure at Lorient, recently liberated by the French Navy, won the decision. The beginnings were however difficult, identity checks at the entrance to the Lorient arsenal, the only access to the enclosure, were maintained, and the premises lacked equipment.

The channel was inaugurated on 1 September 2000. The inauguration evening saw guests such as musicians Dan Ar Braz, Denez Prigent, and Gilles Servat performing.

=== Early years ===
The initial schedule of the channel and the integration of Breton into it was inspired by the Welsh channel S4C and the Irish channel TG4. It defines itself as a general-interest channel, but without newscasts, and centered around three dominant themes: Brittany, Celticness and the sea. Seventeen hours of programs are broadcast from 7:30am to 12:30am, including five hours of first-run programs (two hours of purchased programs and three of produced programs).

The channel broadcast part of its programs in Breton from 2000 to 2008, which imposed the development of dubbing for the audio-visual productions not having it. Nearly three million euros were invested by the channel over this period, and part of the costs were financed by the regional council of Brittany from 2003. Nearly 400 hours were thus doubled, to which nearly 95 hours were added. magazines in Breton produced by the channel.

The establishment of the channel in Lorient allowed the constitution of an image center in the city, either by draining companies outside the city, or by allowing the creation. Lorient then manages to concentrate a quarter of the audiovisual production companies in Brittany. In terms of broadcasting, it is initially provided by the two satellite bouquets TPS and Canalsatellite in basic subscriptions, as well as via cable on the Noos networks in the west of France and in Paris. The channel did not have a terrestrial frequency in its early days, which limited its audience, and the managers of TV Breizh sought in the following years to change the situation9. The channel candidate for the first call for tenders for French digital terrestrial television in 2002, but was not selected by the CSA. It was not retained either during the allocation of new frequencies on this same network in 2005, nor in the allocation of a local frequency in Nantes in 2003.

The audience shares were disappointing at first. TV Breizh rose to around 20th place in the ranking of 80 theme channels, for an audience share of 0.2%. The impossibility of obtaining a terrestrial frequency by the CSA does not allow the channel to develop its audience potential. These blockages caused the departure of Rozenn Milin from the management, and the takeover of the channel by the main shareholder.

=== Change of positioning ===
The TF1 Group increased its stake from 22% to 40% at the start of the 2003-2004 television season, and announced its intention to become the majority shareholder, which it completed in 2007. At the same time, programming in Breton saw its share decline, with the disappearance of several projects still in production, for the benefit of American series and productions from the TF1 Group. The aim is to go above the 1% audience mark in order to capture more advertising resources, which the channel did in February 2004 by climbing at the same time to 4th place among cable and satellite. A merger with Match TV was studied for a time, but was finally postponed due to the good audiences of TV Breizh.

Local presence decreased in the programming, the 20-minute evening news bulletin, hosted by two presenters, changed to a seven-minute all-image format in 2006. The dubbing of movies to Breton was made effective 31 December 2008. The programs in Breton were subsequently transferred to the Dizale association, which was charged by the region of Brittany with promoting the Breton language.

In 2007, the French government decided to award a bonus channel to the TF1, M6 and Canal+ groups as compensation for the switch-off of analogue television in 2011. TF1 thus intended to reassign TV Breizh to free DTT in 2011. Since 1 January 2010, the channel has been reformatted for its arrival on DTT in 2011, which never took place as Brussels deemed the award illegal under European directives, and decided to create a new channel which would be HD1. However, the Breton programs have completely disappeared; only the branding alluded to the coast of Brittany. Since 2 January 2012, it has been broadcast on the optional packages of ADSL operators (included on Bbox).

At the level of the Lorient region, the pole is developing, six other channels of the TF1 group starting from 2005 to be broadcast from this city. On 8 October 2012, however, the closure of the Lorient image center was announced, from which several theme channels of the TF1 group were broadcast, including TV Breizh. The final move to Boulogne-Billancourt was announced for March 2013; from 26 March, the broadcasting of programs is transferred to Boulogne-Billancourt, and the site closed permanently on 21 May. Of the 33 people then employed, only ten were transferred to the Paris region, the rest not wishing to leave the region.

After Discovery Communications took 20% in the channel in December 2012, Groupe TF1 became again the sole owner of TV Breizh as of 17 July 2015.

== Programmes ==
TV Breizh concentrates on local programming such as news programmes, but also airs reruns of old TF1 programmes such as Murder, She Wrote, Columbo and films. This has made it more of a national entertainment station rather than a purely local station. Programmes in the Breton language decreased gradually in favour of French and International programmes, mainly series, and as of 2010, they had, controversially, totally disappeared.

== See also ==
- List of Celtic-language media
- S4C – Welsh language TV station
- BBC Alba – Scottish Gaelic TV station
- TG4 – Irish language TV station
- EITB - Basque language TV station
