= The Parisian Agency: Exclusive Properties =

2020 French reality television series

- Genre: Reality
- Ending theme: "We Are Your Friends (Two Lanes Remix)" by Justice (S1) "So Deep" by Peter Peters (S2–5)
- Country of origin: France
- Original language: French
- No. of seasons: 5
- No. of episodes: 37

Production
- Production company: Réservoir Prod

Original release
- Release: September 24, 2020 – present

The Parisian Agency: Exclusive Properties (French: L'Agence; lit. 'The Agency') is a French reality television series. It follows the Boulogne-Billancourt-based Kretz family with "ordinary" origins and their independent luxury real estate agency Kretz & Partners. It first premiered on 24 September 2020 on TMC (part of TF1) in France and Monaco. Internationally, it was released as a Netflix Original on 23 June 2021.

== Cast ==
- Olivier Kretz, the father
- Sandrine Kretz, the mother
- Martin Kretz, the eldest son
- Valentin Kretz, the second eldest son
- Louis Kretz, the second youngest son
- Raphaël Kretz, the youngest son
- Majo, the grandmother

== Episodes ==
=== Series overview ===
Season	Episodes	Originally released (France)	
Season	Episodes	First released	Last released
1	5	September 24, 2020	October 8, 2020
2	6	January 13, 2022	January 27, 2022
3	8	January 12, 2023	February 2, 2023
4	10	December 7, 2023	February 8, 2024
5	8	December 5, 2024	January 30, 2025

=== Season 1 (2020) ===
No. in season	Title	Original release date	Netflix (Global)
1	"Episode 1"	September 24, 2020	June 23, 2021
2	"Episode 2"	September 24, 2020	June 23, 2021
3	"Episode 3"	October 1, 2020	June 23, 2021
4	"Episode 4"	October 1, 2020	June 23, 2021
5	"Episode 5"	October 8, 2020	June 23, 2021

=== Season 2 (2022) ===
No. in season	Title	Original release date	Netflix (Global)
1	"Episode 1"	January 13, 2022	March 3, 2022
2	"Episode 2"	January 13, 2022	March 3, 2022
3	"Episode 3"	January 20, 2022	March 3, 2022
4	"Episode 4"	January 20, 2022	March 3, 2022
5	"Episode 5"	January 27, 2022	March 3, 2022
6	"Episode 6"	January 27, 2022	March 3, 2022

=== Season 3 (2023) ===
No. in season	Title	Original release date	Netflix (Global)
1	"Episode 1"	January 12, 2023	May 24, 2023
2	"Episode 2"	January 12, 2023	May 24, 2023
3	"Episode 3"	January 19, 2023	May 24, 2023
4	"Episode 4"	January 19, 2023	May 24, 2023
5	"Episode 5"	January 26, 2023	May 24, 2023
6	"Episode 6"	January 26, 2023	May 24, 2023
7	"Episode 7"	February 2, 2023	May 24, 2023
8	"Episode 8"	February 2, 2023	May 24, 2023

=== Season 4 (2023–24) ===
No. in season	Title	Original release date	Netflix (Global)
1	"Episode 1"	December 7, 2023	May 20, 2024
2	"Episode 2"	December 7, 2023	May 20, 2024
3	"Episode 3"	December 14, 2023	May 20, 2024
4	"Episode 4"	December 14, 2023	May 20, 2024
5	"Episode 5"	December 21, 2023	May 20, 2024
6	"Episode 6"	January 11, 2024	May 20, 2024
7	"Episode 7"	January 18, 2024	May 20, 2024
8	"Episode 8"	January 25, 2024	May 20, 2024
9	"Episode 9"	February 1, 2024	May 20, 2024
10	"Episode 10"	February 8, 2024	May 20, 2024

=== Season 5 (2024–25) ===
No. in season	Title	Original release date	Netflix (Global)
1	"Episode 1"	December 5, 2024	April 2, 2025
2	"Episode 2"	December 5, 2024	April 2, 2025
3	"Episode 3"	December 12, 2024	April 2, 2025
4	"Episode 4"	December 19, 2024	April 2, 2025
5	"Episode 5"	January 9, 2025	April 2, 2025
6	"Episode 6"	January 16, 2025	April 2, 2025
7	"Episode 7"	January 23, 2025	April 2, 2025
8	"Episode 8"	January 30, 2025	April 2, 2025

== Production ==
The Kretz family were approached by Hugo Jaguenau with the idea of developing a television series. It is produced by Réservoir Prod. Principal photography took place over the course of six months.
