= Ushuaïa TV =

French TV channel

USHUAÏA TV
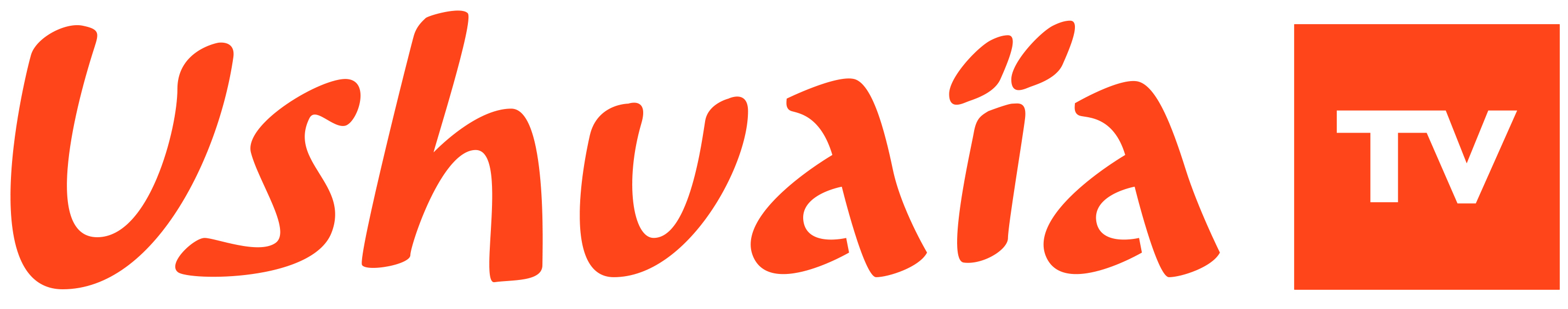

Ownership
- Owner: Groupe TF1
- Sister channels: TF1; TMC; TFX; TF1 Séries Films; LCI; TV Breizh; Histoire TV

History
- Launched: 14 March 2005

Links
- Website: https://ushuaiatv.fr/

Ushuaïa TV is a French television channel, owned by Groupe TF1. The network carries programming about nature.

== History ==
Ushuaïa TV was launched on 14 March 2005 by Groupe TF1, inspired by the TF1 popular show Ushuaïa Nature.

Ushuaïa TV and TF1 other pay-TV channels were initially available exclusively (except cable networks) on TPS which merged on 21 March 2007 with Canalsat. On 2 January 2012, they joined ISP optional packages. Ushuaïa TV arrived on Freebox TV and CanalSat Caraïbes on 1 January 2015, replacing Stylia.

In December 2012, Discovery Communications acquired 20% of TF1 pay-TV thematic channels for €170 million for Eurosport and €14 million for Ushuaïa TV, Histoire, Stylia and TV Breizh.

On 17 July 2015, TF1 sold its remaining 49% stake in Eurosport to Discovery Communications for €492 million. At the same time, the French group bought out the 20% stake held by the American group in its pay-TV channels (TV Breizh, Histoire and Ushuaïa) for 14.6 million euros.

On 5 December 2019, TV Breizh, Ushuaïa TV and Histoire were rebranded with a "TV" logo common between them.

In late 2024, TF1 sold almost all rights of the Ushuaïa brand to L'Oréal for €27.5 million, which produces branded shower gels which used to be associated with the TF1 show. TF1 retains only rights to audiovisual, entertainment and hotel activities.

== Programming ==
Ushuaïa TV concentrates on nature, but also airs reruns of old TF1 programmes such as Ushuaïa Nature.
