= Tele Monte Carlo (disambiguation) =

Tele Monte Carlo may refer to:

- TMC (TV channel), also known as Télé Monte Carlo, or TMC Monte Carlo, French language Monegasque television station
- Telemontecarlo, now defunct Italian television station
