= Histoire TV =

French TV channel

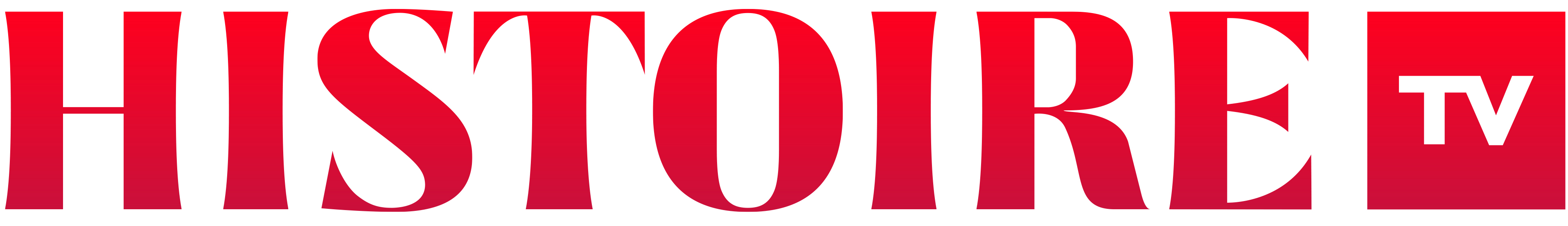
- Country: France

Programming
- Language: French
- Picture format: 1080i HDTV (downscaled to 16:9 576i for the SDTV feed)

Ownership
- Owner: Groupe TF1
- Sister channels: TF1; TMC; TFX; TF1 Séries Films; LCI; TV Breizh; Ushuaïa TV

History
- Launched: 14 July 1997; 29 years ago
- Former names: Histoire (1997-2019)

Links
- Website: histoire.fr

Histoire TV is a French television channel, owned by Groupe TF1. The network mainly carries programming about historical events.

== History ==
Histoire was launched on 14 July 1997 by an alliance of public holdings (France Télévisions, INA and La Sept-Arte) and private shareholders (Pathé, Wanadoo and Suez).

In June 2004, the Groupe TF1 acquired fully Histoire, privatizing it.

On 2 January 2012, the TF1 pay-TV channels joined ISP optional packages. Previously, Histoire was exclusively available on TPS, Canalsat and for 0.49€ on Free.

In December 2012, Discovery Communications acquired 20% of TF1 pay-TV thematic channels for €170 million for Eurosport and €14 million for Ushuaïa TV, Histoire, Stylia and TV Breizh.

On 17 July 2015, TF1 sold its remaining 49% stake in Eurosport to Discovery Communications for €492 million. At the same time, the French group bought out the 20% stake held by the American group in its pay-TV channels (TV Breizh, Histoire and Ushuaïa) for 14.6 million euros.

Patrick Buisson, who was the channel managing director from 2007 to 2018, had his son Georges hired there until the latter was "exfiltrated" from the Stylia channel after disagreements with his father.

The "TV" logo was adopted by TV Breizh, Ushuaa TV, and Histoire on December 4, 2019.

Its competitor is Toute l'Histoire.

== See also ==
- France 5 – French public television channel with documentary programming
