= Canal 10 (France) =

Proposed French commercial private TV channel

Canal 10 was the code name of a project for a French national commercial and private television channel, a variation of Télé Monte-Carlo, developed from 1965 and planned to be launched in France at the start of the 1970s. The company was developed and managed by Jean Frydman and supported by Marcel Bleustein-Blanchet of Publicis and Sylvain Floirat, director of Europe 1, through the Monegasque channel Télé Monte-Carlo.

== Historical context ==
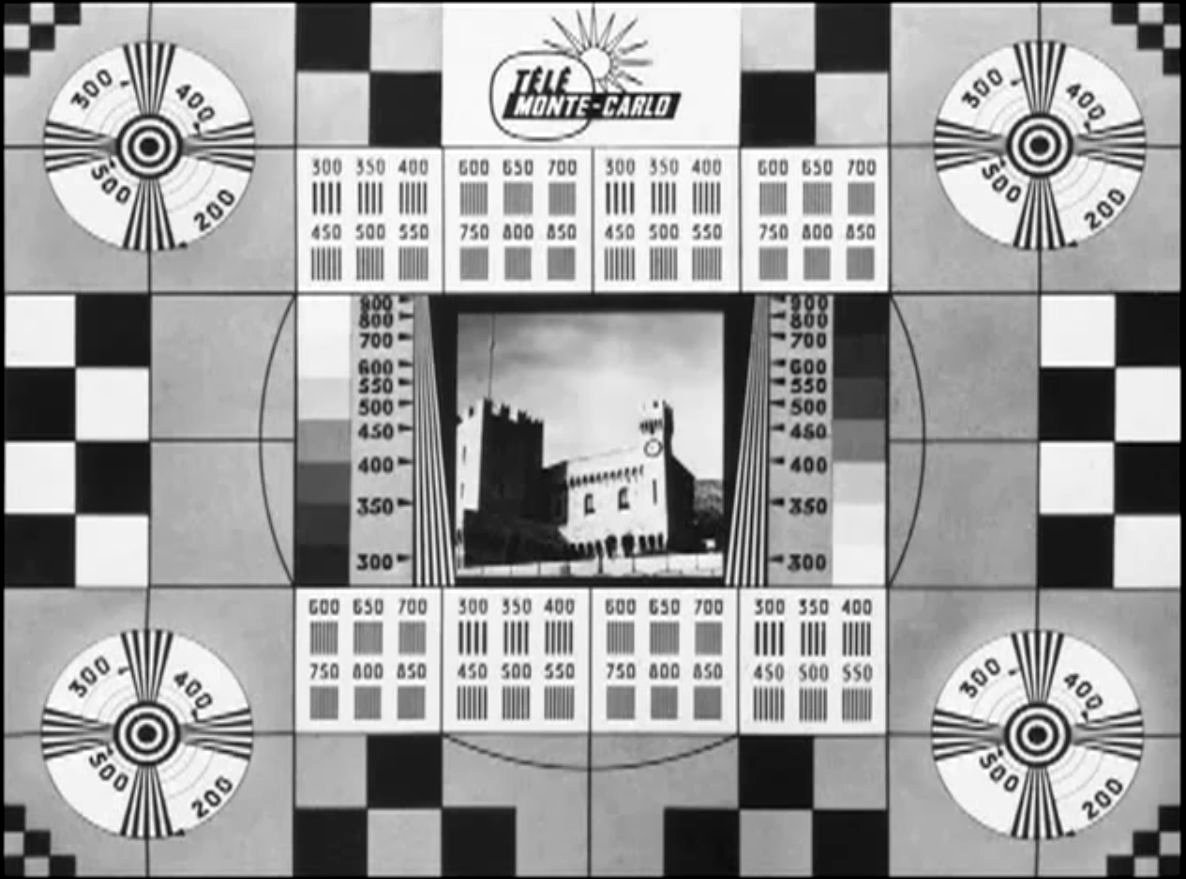
TMC's test pattern in 1954.

In 1952, plans for several French-speaking regional private television channels were underway, including one in the principality of Andorra (project abandoned in 1953); one in Saarbrücken in West Germany with Télé-Sarre (another name for “Europe 1 Télévision”); one in the principality of Monaco for Télé Monte-Carlo, and one at the Grand-Duchy of Luxembourg for Télé Luxembourg (future RTL Télévision), to be financed by private or mixed companies such as Sofirad and intended to exploit advertising. The print media at the time were concerned at the arrival of commercial television and of the joint company SOFIRAD, fearing the impact it would have on advertising budgets. These concerns were relayed by certain deputies in the National Assembly.

At the end of the 1950s, when construction began on the second French national channel RTF Télévision 2, several technical questions arose. First, it was necessary to select a format and anticipate the transition to color television broadcasting: whether use the same high definition 819 line black and white format as the leading French channel; or to adopt the European 625 line format. In 1958, to prepare for the creation of the second channel, RTF technicians carried out experimental high-definition 819-line television broadcasts in black and white and the French SÉCAM color standard, with a subcarrier at the frequency 7.25 MHz, using UHF band IV, because the VHF band channels were already saturated by the transmitters of the first channel. The reception results were disappointing, and the exploitation of the channel spectrum above 15 MHz for each channel in 819 lines considerably restricted the use of simultaneous frequencies in UHF, an essential problem for national coverage. During the 1960, following these various tests and the decisions of the public authorities, the engineer Henri de France abandoned his developments to adapt his SECAM system to high definition 819 lines, while the second French national channel officially adopted the European standard of 625 lines. In addition to technical considerations, the status of the second channel was raised but the public authorities soon decided that the second channel would be public, and would not seek brand advertising. In October 1964, well before the second ORTF channel adopted color, the private channel Télé Monte-Carlo announced that it was carrying out experiments with the SÉCAM standard in 625 lines from Monaco.

In April 1965, two years after the creation of the Second ORTF channel, the project for a third French national channel was studied. Once again, the question of its private or public status as well as financing through advertising are debated both by the professional sector and political leaders, as well as by public authorities. Some are fiercely opposed to these projects, notably the heads of the written press. The director of the ORTF raises the possibility of a third channel with an educational vocation, intended for certain minorities such as students, unions or farmers.

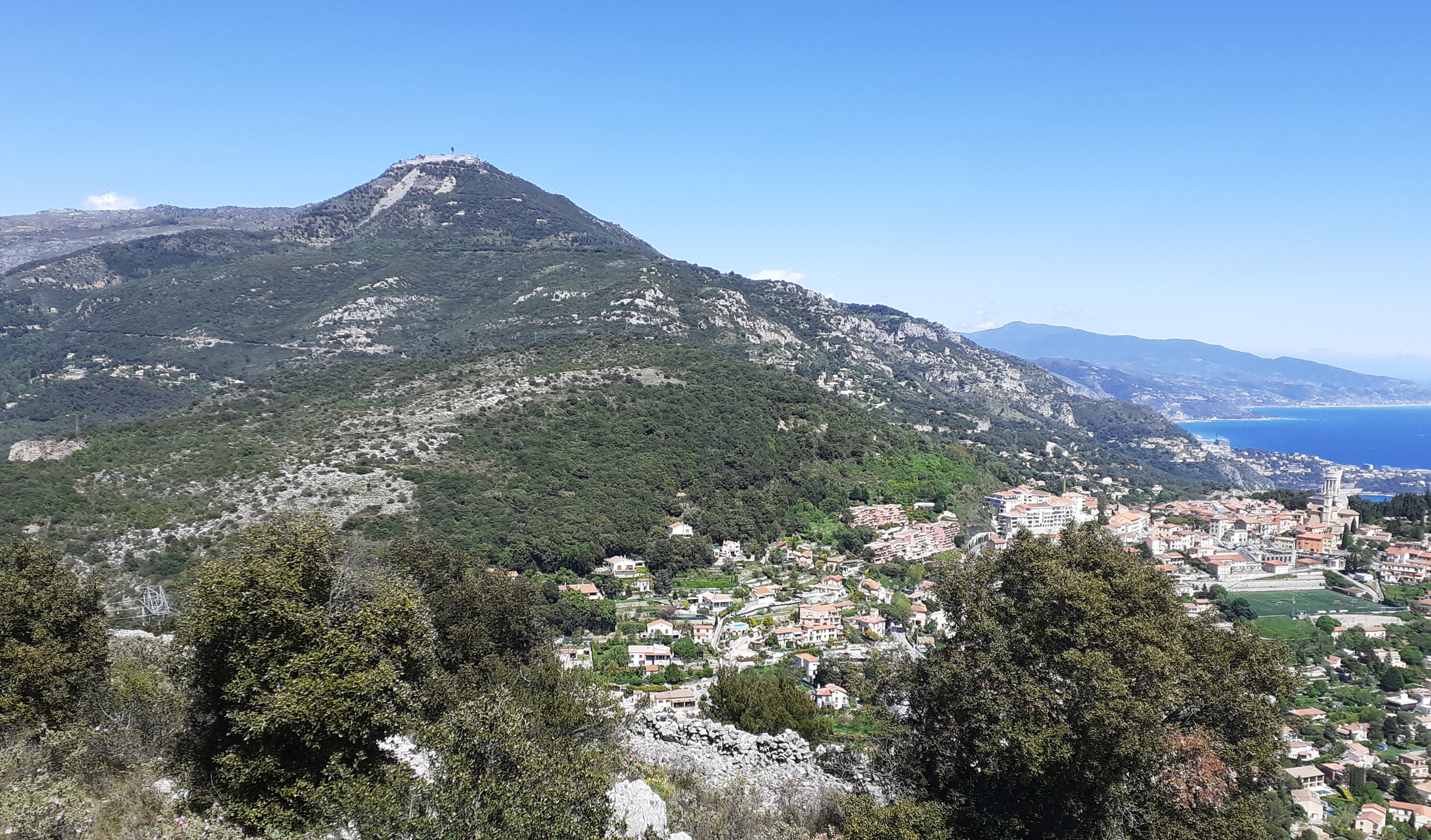
TMC's main transmitting location at Mont Agel, close to Monte-Carlo.

At the same period, Télé Monte-Carlo launched a promotional campaign in the South-East of France and set up studios and offices in Marseille, after having optimized its 819-line transmitters to try to cover the second largest city in France and its management even studied the use of a complementary “offshore” re-transmitter, installed at sea outside territorial waters on a ship, opposite the Marseille harbor, a project quickly abandoned.

Since January 1965, a national debate concerning television advertising has been underway, facing certain opposition from politics and the written press has emerged to prevent the arrival of commercial advertising on French public television. At this period, France only had two national television channels, the second of which was only received by around 20% of the population, and 12 public regional television stations spread across France under the aegis of the ORTF. whose broadcasts are broadcast by the two national channels.

On January 6, 1967, the press mentioned a first attempt to undermine ORTF's television monopoly. Designed to create a private channel, this project should notably associate Télé Luxembourg and Télé Monte-Carlo as well as two additional transmitters installed on French soil to cover two-thirds of France and benefit from commercial advertising. At the initiative of Europe 1, the company Pro-TV was formed to manage the advertising space of the second public channel and offer various turnkey films and programs to the ORTF. Thus, in June 1967, at the initiative of the former minister Michel Maurice-Bokanowski and with the support of the deputy Robert-André Vivien, the company Pro-TV was formed with in its capital, various representatives of the electronics industry and advertising agencies; this private organization is supposed to manage television advertising contracts with brands while the second ORTF channel is taking off thanks to its color broadcasts. The Pro-TV company could also provide the ORTF channels with various programs and feature films. In 1967, the directors of Pro-TV went even further and studied the creation of a third television channel of private or mixed status and financed by brand advertising. The initiative is supported by television manufacturers who wish to boost the sale of color receivers.

In June 1970, the press revealed the details of a private television project whose code name was “Canal 10” and whose managers were practically the same as the company Pro-TV created in 1967.

=== A national private channel ===
Since the mid-1950s, a small portion of French viewers have also been able to tune in to a private channel depending on their location; on the German border for Télé-Sarre (stopped in 1958) and Télé Monte-Carlo from the Principality of Monaco, for the South-East. Founded in 1952, the first Radio and Television company counts among its members, Philippe Boegner, director of Paris-Match, Pierre Archambault, president of the National Union of the Regional Daily Press, Charles Michelson of Radio Monte-Carlo, Jean Dufour, director from Crédit Lyonnais or the engineer Henri de France, from Radio-Industrie. The company's first work consisted of installing television transmitters in Saarland and Monaco in 819-line high definition format. These antennas are both the property of the company of Prince Rainier III and Charles Michelson, Images et Son, as well as Télé Luxembourg, which became RTL Télé-Luxembourg in 1972 when it switched to color television broadcasting. Ten years later, there remain two private channels whose capital is partly held by French companies for Télé Luxembourg] or even managed by French shareholders for Télé Monte-Carlo then through Europe 1 in 1958, under the control of Sofirad, French limited company, owned by the French State. In June 1971, continuing its desire to develop, Télé Monte-Carlo undertook to extend the coverage of its channel to Italy and attract viewers thanks to color television broadcasting in SÉCAM standard, on UHF channel 35.

Several personalities involved in the media or advertising are taking up two separate files concerning, on the one hand, the creation of a third national French television channel but which would be of private status and, on the other hand, the potential commercialization brand advertising spaces to finance it. We can thus note Marcel Bleustein-Blanchet founder of Publicis, Sylvain Floirat director of Europe 1, Marcel Dassault's group, the Havas advertising agency which was two-thirds nationalized in 1945 as well as Sofirad, controlled by the State French.

== Advertising, a political choice ==
Unlike the British neighbor having granted since 1955, access to the private and independent television network ITV, a direct competitor to the public service of the two public channels of BBC Television and associating around twenty private regional production units delivering distinct channels around a joint national program with advertising, France postponed the use of brand advertising until 1967 and thus restricted the financing of a new private channel. From 1958, the principle of launching a second private national channel financed by advertising was studied, based on the success of the Europe 1 radio station.

But since 1959, only so-called “compensated” advertising of collective interest, that is to say, promoting a service, a type of product or an institution while avoiding any commercial brand, has been permitted. television: the Caisse d'Epargne et de Prévoyance, peas, the Air France agency, pasta, the National Lottery, etc.

In May 1967, it was learned that the creation of the third ORTF channel was under study and that it could be financed by commercial advertising. However, during this period, certain elected parliamentarians fiercely opposed the introduction of advertising, more specifically on public channels. However, Jacques Antoine, director of Télé Monte-Carlo, managed to manage, from the channel's headquarters based in Monaco, a television production company associating both TMC and Télé-Luxembourg, at the same period.

Following the events of May 1968 and then the departure of President Charles de Gaulle, new perspectives seemed to open up for a new channel independent of ORTF.

== Circumventing regulations ==
Between 1965 and 1970, several initiatives anticipated the development of an alternative television offering to that of the ORTF. Since 1952, the Société Spéciale d'Entreprise (SSE) has operated the Télé Monte-Carlo station under an agreement concluded with Radio Monte-Carlo, the exclusive concessionaire of broadcasting rights in the Principality of Monaco at that time. In 1958, the Société Spéciale d'Entreprise (SSE) therefore controlled Télé Monte-Carlo, becoming a 32% subsidiary of Europe 1 belonging to Sofirad.

Supported by his friends Marcel Bleustein-Blanchet from Publicis and Sylvain Floirat, director of Europe 1, the entrepreneur Jean Frydman, co-founder and co-manager of the Europe 1 advertising agency and creator of various private branches in the mid-1950s, including the Telma channel in Morocco is piloting several development projects for the Monegasque channel Télé Monte-Carlo. From 1967, Jean Frydman administered the company SSE which controlled Télé Monte-Carlo, before taking over the management of the channel two years later. In 1969, Jean Frydman took charge of the management of Télé Monte-Carlo and with the aim of supplying the schedule, he became the owner of a rich catalog of films. For a long time, he has wanted to create the first national commercial television channel in France, like Télé Monte-Carlo or Télé Luxembourg. The economic model consists of exploiting the large television advertising market that is very little exploited by the public service ORTF; inspired by the British BBC-ITV television model. From the summer of 1969, the merger between Europe 1 and Télé Monte-Carlo resulted in special programs produced jointly and broadcast simultaneously on both channels, radio and television.

== Télé Monte-Carlo as a base ==
From then on, Frydman focused on strengthening resources and commercially developing Télé Monte-Carlo, one of whose transmitters has been experimenting with or operating the F10 television broadcast frequency on 199.70 MHz, known as “Canal 10”, since the 1950s. in addition to other broadcast frequencies. So a few years later in 1973, he managed to extend the programming of Télé Monte-Carlo to Italy, with the Telemontecarlo channel. At the beginning of 1969, the boss of Télé Monte Carlo decided to create a new private commercial television called “Canal 10”. Ultimately, the project consists above all of extending the broadcasting of TMC over 625 UHF lines, over a large southern half of France and as far as Paris, with the help of Europe 1.

After the departure of Charles De Gaulle in April 1969, the new President of the Republic, Georges Pompidou, seemed rather favorable to new television channels and Frydman notably received the support of the Minister of Finance, Valéry Giscard d'Estaing. From June 1971, several technical tests of color television broadcasting to the SÉCAM standard took place from Monaco, notably intended for Italy with the establishment of UHF channel 35 UHF, broadcast to the G standard, with a power of 50 kW.

In June 1970, details of the Canal 10 project were made public. Télé-Monte-Carlo plans to finance a network of 25 transmitters capable of reaching nearly 9,850,000 households, out of the 10.5 million already served by ORTF. The management of the transmitters would be entrusted to the public service, which would also receive remuneration based on advertising revenue from Télé Monte-Carlo. Broadcasting 16 hours a day, from 7 a.m. 30 in the morning to 10:30 p.m., without interruption. The distribution of the capital of the Canal 10 company could be 80%, made up of shares reserved for the public and 20% held by groups such as those of Bleustein - Blanchet, Dassault, Floirat, Electronic Industries, etc. Until now, the Canal 10 company is a Monegasque limited company, whose capital is held by Europe 1 (32%), Publicis (27%), the Principality of Monaco (18.5%) and Marcel Dassault (22. 5%). Jean d'Arcy, first director of programs for French television from 1952 to 1959, is expected to be director of programs for the private channel.

== Opposition and support ==
To avoid confrontation with the press, the Canal 10 project managed to obtain the support of its first regional partner, La Dépêche de Toulouse, thanks to the general director of Europe 1, Jacques Abergel. Joining forces with Canal 10 are around twenty regional newspapers, including the Marseille daily Le Provençal. Furthermore, in 1970, the Canal 10 file benefited from the support of French Prime Minister Jacques Chaban-Delmas and that of Michel Jobert, the Secretary General of the Presidency of the French Republic, close to Georges Pompidou. But in June 1971, the main headlines of the Parisian national press L'Aurore, Le Figaro, France-soir, Le Monde, Le Parisien libéré and Paris-Jour declared that they were distancing themselves from Canal 10. During the year 1971, after some hesitation, President Georges Pompidou, influenced by his minister Michel Debré, a fierce supporter of the ORTF monopoly, finally opposed the principle of a private national channel, which further postponed the arrival of a national commercial chain in France. Furthermore, in 1972, the third ORTF channel was already under construction, which at least temporarily suspended Jean Frydman's projects.

However, from June 1971, Jean Frydman did not abandon the expansion strategy of Télé Monte-Carlo in France but he preferred in the short term to focus on Italy and color television broadcasting while this country has not yet decided on the standard it will adopt. Likewise, in 1971, during the battle between the PAL and SÉCAM standards in Italy, French industrialists suggested to President Pompidou to authorize TMC to broadcast in Italian and in color using the SÉCAM standard towards Rome and the Italian coast, from the powerful ORTF transmitter in Bastia, to encourage Italians to massively purchase SÉCAM standard receivers and better penetrate this market. Once again, the President of the Republic refuses. With the liberal political turn initiated by his successor Valéry Giscard d'Estaing, Prime Minister Jacques Chirac undertook important reforms during the summer of 1974, including the suppression of the ORTF, symbol of Gaullian control of information; Giscard d'Estaing declared in this regard that radio and television must be as independent as possible and that they are not the "voice of France".

On April 20, 1972, in an interview with the daily Le Monde, the entrepreneur Jean Frydman nevertheless believed that the end of the state monopoly was near and that brand advertising was one of the means of financing a new national channel.

== A fourth channel ==
The hope of seeing the Canal 10 project resurface in another form was raised as soon as Valéry Giscard d'Estaing was elected in May 1974. Now under the code name "Canal 39", the file was relaunched again by Jean Frydman and Sylvain Floirat, chairman and CEO of Europe 1, because the company benefits from international agreements for the operation of UHF channel 39. According to several surveys at the time, the majority of French people wanted to see the addition of a private television channel; but once again, the risk that the advertising cake from which the written press benefits will be reduced is raised by this fourth channel project.

Considered by some analysts as the “delivery reform”, the abolition of the ORTF in 1974 gave rise to certain hopes of liberalization. But in 1975, under pressure from the Gaullists and more particularly from his Prime Minister Jacques Chirac, who was hostile to the abandonment of the media monopoly, President Giscard froze any initiative for audiovisual liberalization and the authorization of private networks. Until its departure in May 1981, the state monopoly remained dominant, except from 1978, a completely different project called "TVCS" because during the 1970s, the national channels did not use not or very infrequently, certain time slots, mainly in the morning and at night.

On January 15, 1975, the board of directors of Télé Monte-Carlo, under the aegis of Jean Frydman, decided to broadcast TMC in Italy, in the Milan region, from a transmitter located in Corsica. The signal must comply with the French “L” standard and the Sécam color standard. According to the press, this project is very close to the “Canal 10” file, already developed by Frydman in 1970. From 1976 to 1980, Henri de France continued to participate in the establishment and operation of the Télé Monte-Carlo retransmission network, especially in Italy.

In December 1976, Europe 1 (Images et Son company) acquired 22% of the shares in the Société Spéciale d'Entreprise (S.S.E.) which operated the station Télé-Monte-Carlo, previously held by the magazine Jours de France. Thus, Europe 1 controls the majority (54%) of the capital of Télé Monte-Carlo, the other participants being Publicis S.A. (27.5%) and the Principality of Monaco (18.5%).

== Other variations ==
Having become CEO of the advertising agency Médiavision, Jean Frydman created a subsidiary of Havas and the Hachette group in 1978, entitled “Television Communication Service” or TVCS. The principle consists of renting these spaces to public service channels to broadcast paid programs, reserved for a professional audience. The channel chosen to retransmit this service is Antenne 2 and the launch of the broadcasts is planned for October 1979 with an encrypted (encrypted) signal that can be rendered in the clear by a decoder. To carry out this enterprise, Frydman and Jacques Abergel joined forces with Pierre Sabbagh, Yves Cannac, Jean Marin and Frédéric Chapus.

During his discussions with Télédiffusion de France, Frydman learned to his great surprise in 1980 that the old 819-line network operated in black and white by TF1 would be available within a few months. In June 1981, political leaders discovered that TDF had forgotten to tell them that the public body had already developed a file for a pay and encrypted cinema channel to exploit this network of transmitters. At the end of 1982, the directors of Havas took over the project and it was now managed by a close friend of François Mitterrand, the CEO of Havas, André Rousselet. The TVCS formula consists of using the transmitters of public channels when they are not broadcasting their programs, to offer in these slots, programs intended for businesses or certain professionals. The principle of encryption or encryption of these broadcasts is studied with certain technicians from TéléDiffusion de France and other advisors, including Léo Scheer, pioneer of what would become the Canal+ channel in 1983. For a few months, Jean Frydman continued to pilot the project for the new pay channel Canal+ but his proximity to former president Valéry Giscard d'Estaing disqualified him in the eyes of the new leaders after the election of François Mitterrand.

Nearly ten years later, in May 1988, a project very similar to that which was developed by Jean Frydman's team in 1967 saw its achievement, on the national public channel FR3, under the name of "Santé Télévision" or STV Télésanté, using access control and the Discret 11 decoder from Canal+. These broadcasts were reserved for personnel and companies in the health sector.

Another paid service reserved for professionals was implemented at the end of the 1970s, using the time slots initially targeted by TVCS but not to broadcast television programs but rather to convey digital data from Teletext delivering targeted and thematic information such as horse racing results or stock market prices. A subscription and a specific Antiope decoder with memory card was offered by the company "Chronoval" first on the public channel FR3 then on the fourth television network, from July 1986. Grundig was the first manufacturer to market this decoder at its Creutzwald factory in Lorraine.

== See also ==
- TMC
- Europe 1
