= TF1 Tower =

Tower in Boulogne-Billancourt, France

- Tour TF1
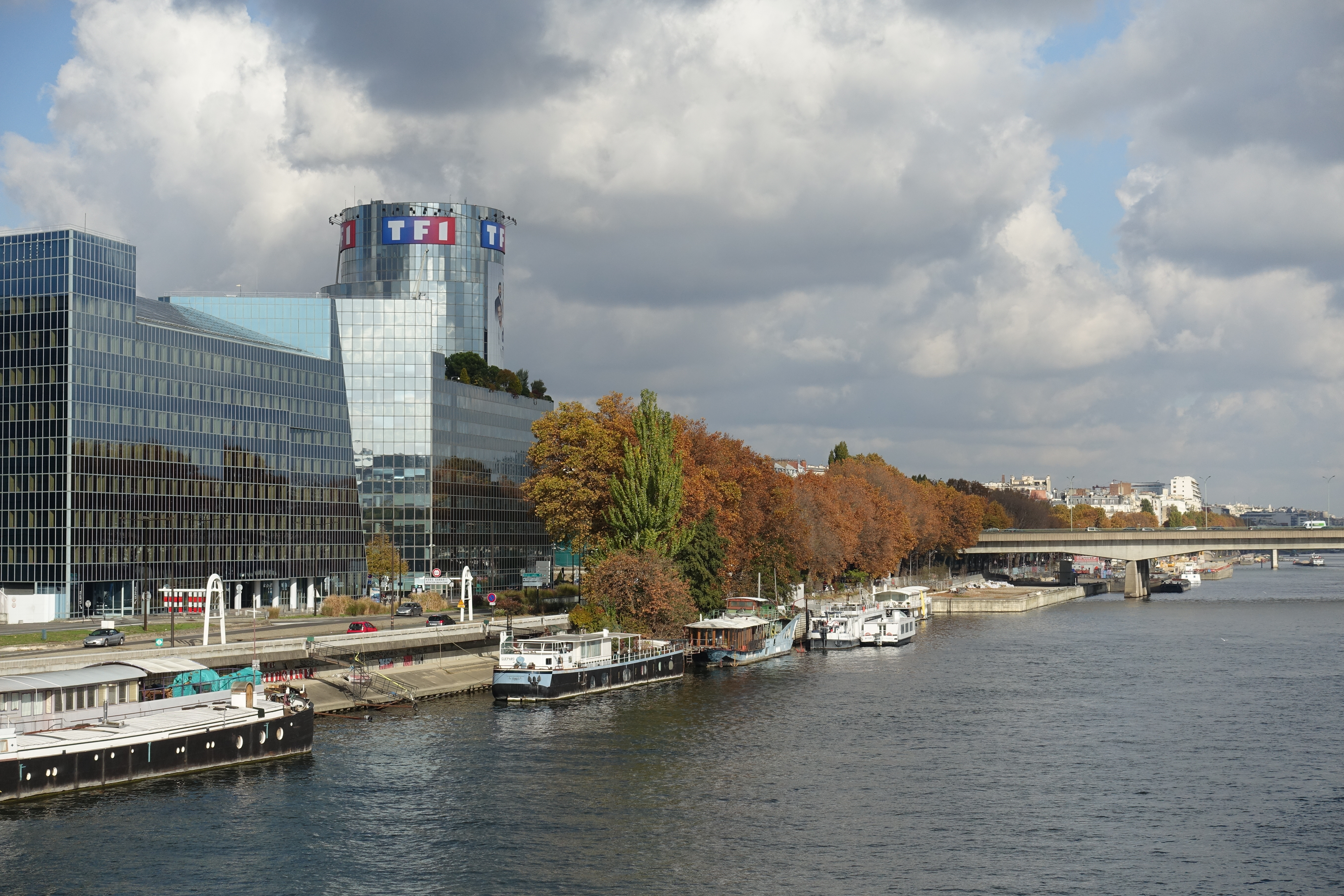
- The TF1 Tower and the Issy Bridge that crosses the Seine River

- Location within Paris

General information
- Type: Office and studio building
- Location: Quai du Point-Du-Jour; Avenue Le-Jour-Se-Lève, Boulogne-Billancourt, France
- Coordinates: 48.833889°N 2.260556°E
- Completed: 1992
- Cost: €56.9 million
- Client: TF1
- Owner: TF1 Group

Height
- Height: 59 metres (194 ft)

Technical details
- Floor count: 14
- Floor area: 45,000 square metres (480,000 sq ft)

Design and construction
- Architect: Roger Saubot

The TF1 Tower (French: Tour TF1) is a building in the Boulogne-Billancourt suburb of Paris, used as the headquarters of the French TV channel TF1 and several subsidiaries of the TF1 Group since 1992.

== Location ==
The TF1 Tower is located at the corner of Quai du Point-Du-Jour and Avenue Le-Jour-Se-Lève in the Point-Du-Jour neighborhood of Boulogne-Billancourt in the Hauts-de-Seine department, southwest of Paris. It is situated close to the Pont aval and the Pont d'Issy.

== Architecture ==
The Point-du-Jour building that houses TF1's headquarters is made up of several blocks: a high-rise block (immeuble de grande hauteur, IGH), a north wing (Aile Nord), a south wing (Aile Sud) and a central building (bâtiment central). The IGH block is the tower itself, a cylindrical volume entirely clad in reflective glass, rising 59 metres over fourteen floors with a net floor area of 45,000 square metres (480,000 sq ft).

The complex was built by the Bouygues group, TF1's parent company, to designs by the architect Roger Saubot, whose firm Saubot-Jullien specialised in corporate headquarters and high-rise buildings.

In the late 2010s, TF1 fully refurbished the tower's aging interiors, redesigning some 30,000 square metres (320,000 sq ft) of office space around a flex office model with coworking areas.

The management offices occupy the top (fourteenth) floor.

== History ==
The tower's construction was decided after a delegated project management agreement dated March 20, 1991, authorised by the administration council on April 11, 1991. The construction was invoiced €37.1 million in fiscal year 1991 and €18.8 million in fiscal year 1992. The TF1 channel moved to the building on June 1, 1992, from its former headquarters at 13-15 rue Cognacq-Jay. Thanks to a leasing contract, the TF1 Group became the owner of the tower on June 30, 2001.

According to journalists Renaud Revel and Henri Haguet, the new headquarters tower is symbolic of TF1's ideological shift toward productivity. TF1 also uses the tower for advertising and displaying.

A webcam on the top of the tower broadcast real-time pictures of Paris on TF1's official website as well as in TF1's news programme studio.

On April 15, 2012, the façade was lit with a 45 square metres (480 sq ft) screen that enabled the news programme to be watched from the banks of the Seine River.

== In popular culture ==
In 1995, the tower was climbed with bare hands by Alain Robert.

In 2005, the TF1 Tower was featured in the introduction animated short film of Arthur's one-man-show Arthur en vrai.

In August 2007, an advertisement for video game Halo 3 showed the game's main character inside the TF1 Tower. Virals videos showed the character near the building's entrance and in the weather forecast studio.

In the November 28th, 2008 episode of Star Academy's eighth season, a special credit video shows kids climbing the tower to reach guest singer Britney Spears who landed on the roof with a helicopter.

In 1997, the tower appeared on the title page of Pierre Péan and Christophe Nick's pamphlet named TF1, un pouvoir. The building was also shown on the covers of the books TF1, une expérience (2006) and Madame, monsieur, bonsoir (2007).

== Gallery ==
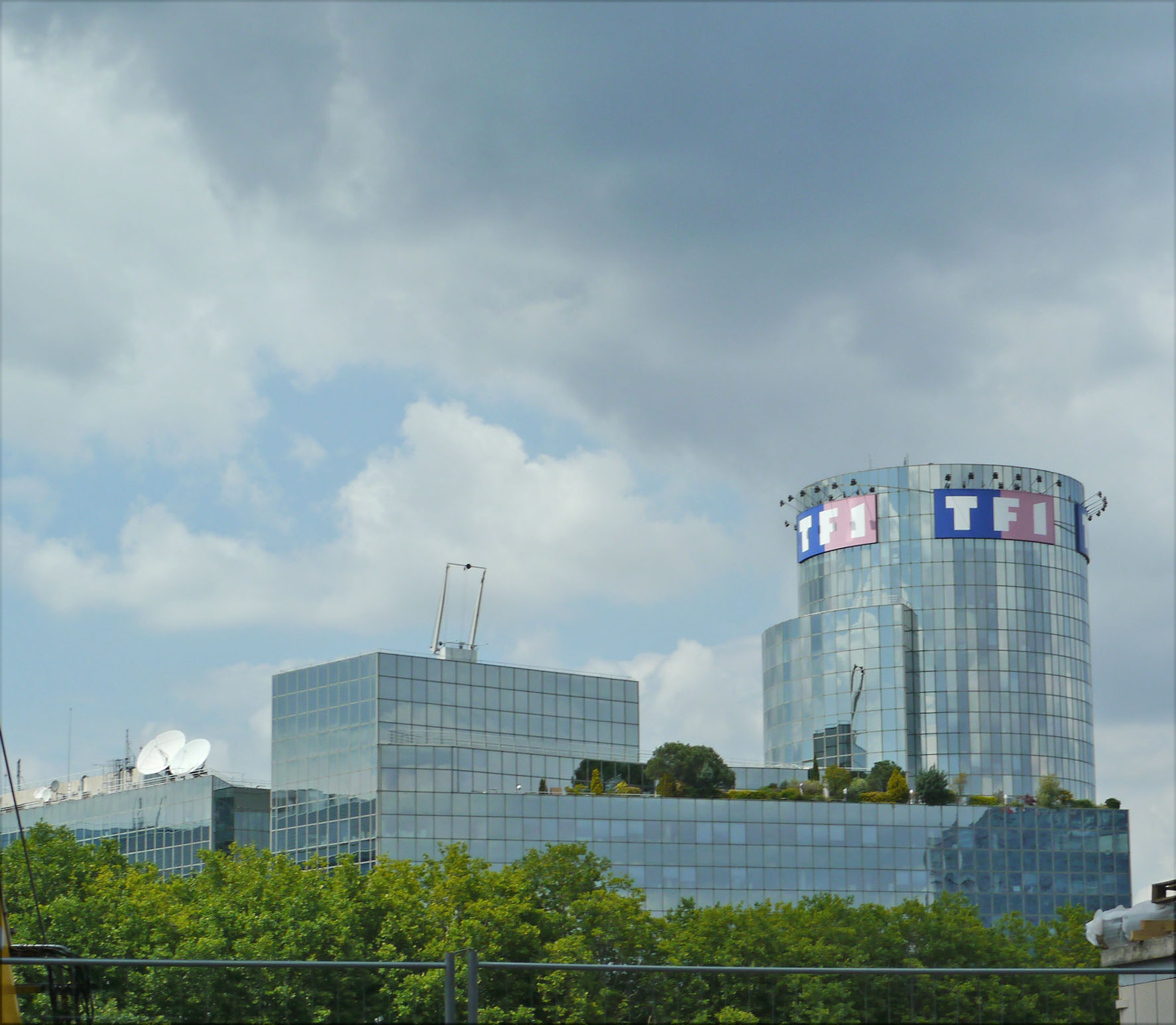
The TF1 Tower

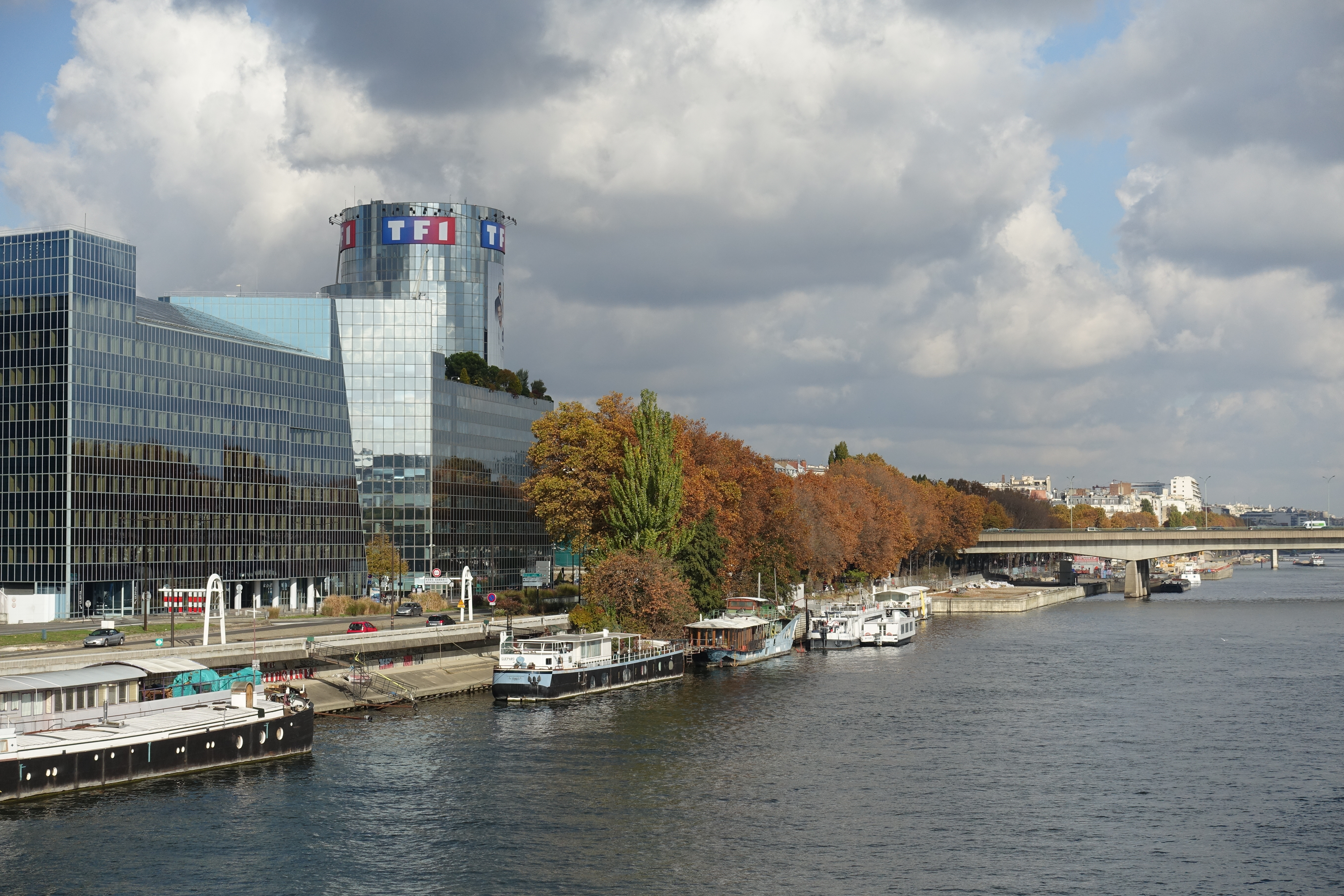
On November 6, 2016.
