= France 3 Nord-Pas-de-Calais =

Coordinates: 50°37′57″N 3°00′23″E

- Logo used since 2018
- Country: France
- Broadcast area: Hauts-de-France
- Headquarters: Lille

Ownership
- Owner: France Télévisions

History
- Launched: 10 April 1950
- Former names: RTF Télé-Lille (1950-1964); ORTF Télé-Lille (1964-1975); FR3 Nord-Picardie (1975-1986); FR3 Nord-Pas-de-Calais Picardie (1986-1992); France 3 Nord-Pas-de-Calais Picardie (1992-2010)

Links
- Website: France 3 Nord-Pas-de-Calais

France 3 Nord-Pas-de-Calais is one France 3's regional services, broadcasting to people in the Nord-Pas-de-Calais region.

The service was founded on 10 April 1950 as RTF Télé-Lille. France 3 Nord-Pas-de-Calais can also be received in Belgium. The service is headquartered in Lille.

== History ==
The Lille transmitter was the first one outside of Paris to be operational, on 10 April 1950. In July 1952, the transmitter was used to conduct a joint Franco-British relay with the BBC Television Service.

== Programs ==
- Brunch
- La voix est libre
- Midi Sports
- Le journal de l'Eurorégion
- En avant la musique
- Goutez-moi ça
- La vie tout simplement
- C'est mieux le matin

== News ==
- Ici 19/20 Nord-Pas-de-Calais
- Ici Matin Nord-Pas-de-Calais
- Ici 12/13 Nord-Pas-de-Calais

== See also ==
- France 3 Picardie
