= TF1 Group =

French media holding company

Télévision Française 1 S.A.

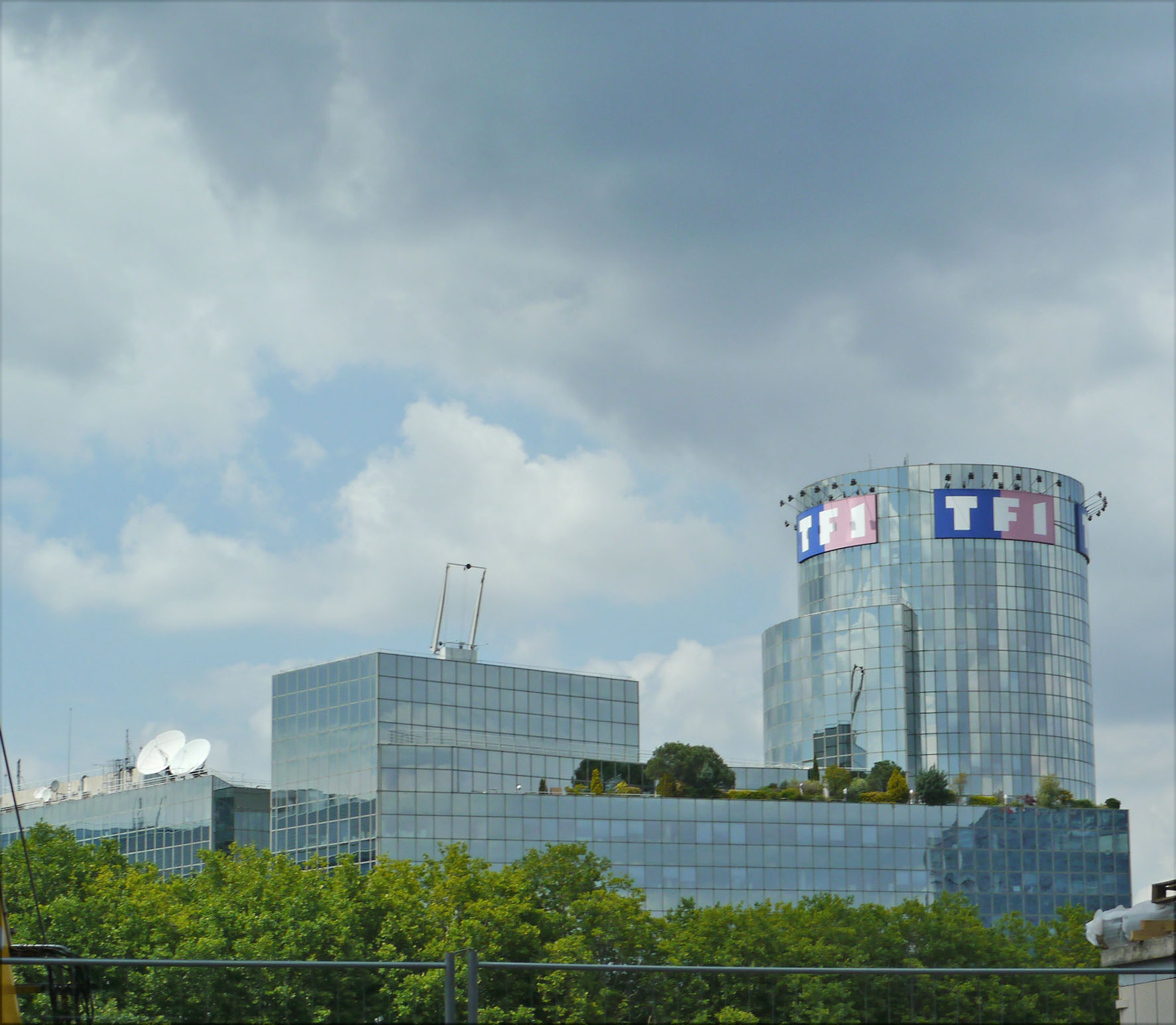
- Headquarters in Boulogne-Billancourt
- Trade name: TF1 Group
- Native name: Groupe TF1
- Type: Public
- Traded as: Euronext Paris: TFI; CAC Mid 60 Component
- Industry: Media
- Predecessors: ORTF
- Founded: 6 January 1975; 51 years ago (original); 16 April 1987; 39 years ago (privatized, current form)
- Founder: Government of France
- Headquarters: TF1 Tower, Boulogne-Billancourt, France
- Key people: Rodolphe Belmer (chairman and CEO)
- Products: Television broadcasting and production, websites, media investments
- Revenue: ▲€2.288 billion (2018)
- Operating income: ▲€174 million (2018)
- Net income: ▲€128 million (2018)
- Total assets: ▼€3.157 billion (2018)
- Number of employees: 3,135 (2018)
- Parent: Bouygues (43.7%)
- Website: https://www.groupe-tf1.fr/en/

Télévision Française 1 S.A., commonly known as the TF1 Group (French: Groupe TF1) is a French media holding company. Its best-known property is the broadcast network TF1. The group was formed after TF1 was privatized in April 1987 in which the channel was launched back on 6 January 1975 twelve years prior. It is controlled with a 43% stake by industrial group Bouygues, and is quoted on Euronext Paris.

== History ==
The history of TF1 traces back to 1975, when the Office de Radiodiffusion-Télévision Française (ORTF) was split into 7 successor institutions. Allegedly to provide competition for Canal+, La Cinq and M6, the French government decided to privatize TF1. In April 1987, the construction conglomerate Bouygues won the resulting auction for the sale of TF1, ahead of the Lagardère Group. On 16 April, Francis Bouygues, the president of Bouygues, presented a check of three billion francs to the government, completing the privatisation of TF1.

In June 2009, TF1 Group agreed to buy the NT1 channel from AB Groupe, as well as AB's 40% stake in TMC Monte Carlo (which would take TF1's total stake to 80%). The deal was cleared by France's competition authority and subsequently by the Council of State in December 2010, dismissing an appeal by Métropole Télévision. As part of the same transaction, the group raised its stake in WB Television to 49%.

On 21 December 2012, Discovery Communications (now known as Warner Bros. Discovery) purchased a 20% stake in Eurosport from TF1 Group for €170m. Discovery had the option to increase its stake to 51% in 2014. If Discovery exercised that option, TF1 Group was entitled to then exercise a put option over the remaining 49% that would see Discovery take full control. On 22 July 2015, Discovery agreed to acquire TF1's remaining 49% stake in the venture. Discovery also took a 20% share in TV Breizh, Histoire, Ushuaia TV and Stylia – for €14m, with the option of increasing its shareholding to 49% in each channel in 2014. Discovery and TF1's production arm will also work together on making programmes.

TF1 Group's Newen agree to acquire a majority stake in Reel One of Montreal in July 2019. Current owner and CEO Tom Berry would retain a minority stake in the company.

In December 2017, the TF1 group finds an agreement with the Canal+ group, The MYTF1 service and thus restored on CANAL decoders and on myCanal and also the control of live (Start-Over) is possible on myCanal. A similar episode occurs in September 2022.

On 18 May 2021, TF1 Group and M6 Group announced that both companies have begun negotiations for a proposed merger. On 16 September 2022, the merger was officially abandoned due to the conditions ordered by the antitrust French authorities.

Some of its channels were affected by an outage on 19 July 2024.

On 23 November 2024, Sky News reported that CVC Capital Partners, TF1, RedBird Capital Partners, All3Media, Mediawan and Kohlberg Kravis Roberts had been linked to a potential takeover bid for ITV plc and a possible break-up of core assets such as ITV Studios and ITVX. This could see TF1 name launched in UK.

== Operations ==
- Studio TF1 - Paris-based TV production company
  - CAPA, French banners
    - CAPA Presse
    - CAPA Corporate
    - CAPA Drama
  - Telfrance, French banners
    - Telfrance Séries Marseille
    - Telfrance Série
    - Telsete
    - MI2
  - Anagram, Sweden
  - 17 Juin Média, France
    - 17 Juin New Media
    - 17 Juin Fiction
  - iZen, Spain
    - Imagic, Lebanon
    - Zebra Producciones, Spain
    - Storyboard Studios, United Kingdom
    - Chalkboard TV, United Kingdom
    - Clapperboard Studios, United Kingdom
  - Nimbus, Denmark
    - Nimbus+
  - Tuvalu, Netherlands
  - Pupkin, Netherlands
    - Juliet, Netherlands
  - De Mensen, Belgium
    - Les Gens
  - Ad Astra, France
  - Dog Haus, Germany
  - Joi Productions, United Kingdom
  - Barjac, France
  - Real Lava, Denmark
  - Amsto, France
  - Marysol, France
  - Télécip, France
  - Slate Entertainment, United Kingdom
  - Indalo y Media, Spain
  - Flanagan Productions, France
  - Aux Singuliers, France
  - Kubik Films, Spain
  - Moonshaker, France
  - Daï Daï Films, France
  - Partita Films, France
  - Tall&Small, Denmark
  - Flare Film, Germany
  - Rise Films, United Kingdom
  - B-Side Productions, United Kingdom
  - Digital Banana Studio, France
  - Felicita Films, France
  - Blue Spirit, Canadian animation company
  - Studio TF1 America, Canadian production outfit
  - Studio TF1 Distribution, international sales and distribution division

=== Former ===
- Ringside Studios, sold to management in February 2026.

=== Streaming service ===
- Salto from 2020 to 2023, with France Télévisions and Groupe M6
- TF1+

=== Television ===
==== Free-to-air ====
- TF1, channel 1
- TMC, channel 10
- TFX (launched in 2005 as NT1), channel 11
- TF1 Séries Films (launched in 2012 as HD1), channel 20
- LCI - La Chaîne Info (launched in 1994), channel 15

==== Pay ====
- TV Breizh (launched in 2000)
- TF1 International, TF1's international channel
- Histoire TV (launched in 1997)
- Ushuaïa TV (launched in 2005)
- Série Club - 50% stake with Groupe M6

==== Former ====
- JET
- Tfou TV
- Stylia (ex-Odyssée launched in 1996, closed in 2014) - 80% stake
- TF6 (closed in 2020) - 50% stake

TF1 also had stakes in France 24, Pink TV, Eurosport and AB Groupe which were divested.

=== Online news site ===
TF1 INFO (current brand launched on 24 January 2022) brings together information provided by TF1 and LCI newscast editions.

=== Other assets ===
The firm holds a number of other interests in the advertising, internet and publishing fields, including Aufeminin and 34% of Metro International's operations in France.
