= TF1 Séries Films =

French television channel

- Country: France

Programming
- Language: French
- Picture format: 1080i HDTV

Ownership
- Owner: TF1 Group
- Sister channels: TF1; LCI; TMC; TFX; TV Breizh; Histoire TV; Ushuaïa TV; Série Club

History
- Launched: 12 December 2012
- Former names: HD1 (2012-2018)

Links
- Website: tf1.fr/tf1-series-films

Availability

Terrestrial
- TNT: Channel 20 (HD)

TF1 Séries Films, formerly HD1 (acronym for Histoire de), is a French TV channel, controlled by TF1 Group. HD1 launched on TNT, satellite, and xDSL on 12 December 2012.

== History ==
=== Proposed new TNT channels ===
With the shutdown of analogue television, TF1 Group initially was set to launch a reformated version of the Breton language channel TV Breizh, to be called 'TV-b'. However, Brussels ordered the cessation of the new channel slots from the former analogue terrestrial companies, i.e. TF1 Group, Canal+ Group and M6 Group. The plans for TV Breizh were abandoned.

=== HD1 ===
In March 2012, the Conseil supérieur de l'audiovisuel (CSA) auditioned TF1 Group following its application for an additional channel from one of the six national HD channels on TNT. TF1 Group chose the name 'HD1' "the network of all narratives".

On 27 March 2012, the CSA confirmed that HD1 would be one of the six HD channels. An agreement was signed 6 July 2012.

On 18 October 2017, TF1 Group announced that HD1 will change its name to TF1 Séries Films in 2018.

== Visual identity ==
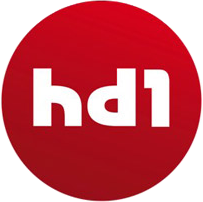
Prototype logo of HD1 (2011).

Logo of HD1 (2012–2018).

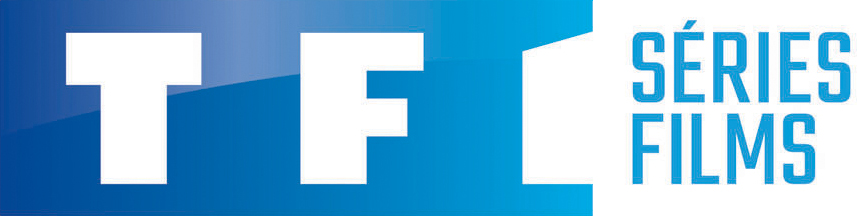
First logo of TF1 Séries Films (2018–2020).

The initial HD1 logo first appeared during the hearing at CSA, on 14 March 2011. The logo was a circle with the text 'hd1' in the centre, the logo could be presented in various colours including red, light green, and blue.

However, in November 2012, A new logo was introduced before the launch of the channel. This new visual identity differs from the previous, the circle was removed and the text is now blue, with the 'HD' text now uppercase and as a ligature.

== See also ==
- List of television stations in France
