= France 3 Picardie =

Coordinates: 49°54′57″N 2°18′06″E

- Logo used since 2018
- Country: France
- Broadcast area: Picardy (Hauts-de-France)
- Headquarters: Amiens

Ownership
- Owner: France Télévisions

History
- Launched: 10 April 1950
- Former names: RTF Télé-Lille (1950-1964); ORTF Télé-Lille (1964-1975); FR3 Nord-Picardie (1975-1986); FR3 Nord-Pas-de-Calais Picardie (1986-1992); France 3 Nord-Pas-de-Calais Picardie (1992-2010)

Links
- Website: France 3 Picardie

France 3 Picardie is one France 3's regional services, broadcasting to people in the Picardy region. France 3 Picardie is headquartered in Amiens. France 3 Picardie produces news programs and other content. The channel was founded in 1950 as RTF Télé-Lille.
