= The Grave (TV series) =

- Also known as: B'Yom ShehaAdama Raada
- Genre: Drama; Thriller
- Created by: Omri Givon
- Directed by: Omri Givon
- Starring: Liana Ayun; Michal Kalman; Tsahi Halevi; Daniel Schwabe; Nadav Netz; Shalom Michelashvili
- Theme music composer: Roy Nassee
- Opening theme: Roy Nassee
- Composer: Roy Nassee
- Countries of origin: Israel; France
- Original language: Hebrew
- No. of series: 1
- No. of episodes: 8 (Keshet)

Production
- Executive producer: Kfir Weiss
- Producers: Jonathan Doweck; Eitan Mansuri
- Production location: Israel
- Cinematography: Nitai Netzer
- Running time: 45 minutes (Keshet)
- Production company: Federation Entertainment

Original release
- Network: Keshet 12
- Release: 23 October 2019

The Grave (Hebrew: ביום שהאדמה רעדה, romanized: Ba'Yom ShehaAdama Raada) is an Israeli drama television series that was first broadcast in Israel on Keshet 12 in October 2019. The series was created by Omri Givon. It uses flashbacks to account for differing time periods, and explains ideas such of multiverses, time travel, and includes references to scientists such as Einstein, Leibniz and Boltzmann.

== Plot ==
An earthquake in the north of Israel reveals a large pit in a nature reserve. Three human skeletons are discovered in the pit, and the plot gets complicated when DNA tests reveal that the three bodies' DNA corresponds to that of three human beings who are still alive.

The first is Yoel Russo, a nature reserve inspector, who raises his only son after losing his wife Hila in a car accident nine years earlier.

Another is Noam Zaid, better known as Nico, a sensory artist. During one of his shows, he gets a disturbing vision through Keren, who volunteers for his demonstration. In the vision, Nico appears to murder Keren and throw her body into a creek.

The third is a young prisoner named Avigail Lavi, who is serving a prison sentence for murder in a women's prison.

Police investigator Gabi and Detective Chava Popper are investigating the subject of skeletons found in the pit. As the investigation progresses more and more questions arise, and there seems no logical explanation.

== Cast ==
- Liana Ayoun as Avigail Lavie, prisoner
- Shalom Michaelashvili as Noam "Nico" Zaid
- Nadav Netz as Yoel Russo, A grieving father who becomes obsessed with finding a way to cheat death when he hears of a scientific discovery of mysterious remains found after an earthquake.
- Michal Kalman as Hava Popper, police investigator
- Tsahi Halevi as Gabriel, policeman
- Adam Karst as Adam, owner of Einstein-Rosen Company
- Ortal Ben-Shoshan as Keren, Nico's girlfriend
- Daniel Gal as Hila Russo, Yoel's wife
- Vladimir Friedman as Professor Boltzmann
- Daniel Schwabe as Noah Russo, Yoel's son
- Tomer Barash as Omer
