= TMC (TV channel) =

Franco–Monégasque general entertainment television channel

- Country: Monaco; France

Programming
- Language: French
- Picture format: 1080i HDTV (downscaled to 576i for the SD feed)
- Timeshift service: TMC +1

Ownership
- Owner: Groupe TF1
- Sister channels: TF1; TFX; TF1 Séries Films; LCI; TV Breizh; Histoire TV; Ushuaïa TV

History
- Launched: November 19, 1954
- Founder: Charles Michelson
- Former names: Télé Monte-Carlo (1954–1963); TMC (1963–1993, 2001–2004); Monte Carlo TMC (1993–2001); TMC Monte-Carlo (2003–2009)

Links
- Website: tf1.fr/tmc

Availability

Terrestrial
- TNT: Channel 10 (HD)

TMC (pronounced [te ɛm se]; originally short for Télé Monte-Carlo) is a Franco–Monégasque entertainment television channel owned by the French media holding company Groupe TF1.

== History ==
=== Origins ===
In 1939, Charles Michelson obtained a license to operate Radio Tangier. The project was taken over by French authorities after World War II to create Radio Impériale. On February 6, 1948, Michelson signed a five-year management contract for shortwave radio at Radio Monte-Carlo. The station was majority owned by Sofirad and, through it, by the government of France. The failure of retransmission experiments led Minister of Information François Mitterrand to make a concession to Michelson. On October 22, 1949, he benefited from a "sub-concession option" for television in Monaco from the company owning Radio Monte-Carlo. Ten days earlier, Sofirad president Jacques Meyer announced that the French government was abandoning RTF television. in Marseille. The decision gave the Monegasque station a de facto television monopoly in southeastern France. Michelson founded the Image et Son company under Monegasque law to develop a network of private television stations in France. To mollify Pierre-Henri Teitgen, the new Minister of Information who opposed this incursion into the RTF monopoly, Michelson ceded all rights to Prince Rainier III of Monaco on August 20, 1951. Rainier became a shareholder in Image and Son. The creation of Monegasque television was confirmed by the French public authorities on February 11, 1952, implementing the Télé Monte-Carlo option on March 21, 1953. France removed the right of extension by relays on French territory, limiting the new television channel's development. At the beginning of 1954, Michelson merged audio-visual equipment manufacturer RVB Radio-Industrie into Images et Son. The company supplied television equipment conforming to the new French high-definition 819-line standard, which was invented by Henri de France.

=== The beginning: Image et Son (1954-1957) ===
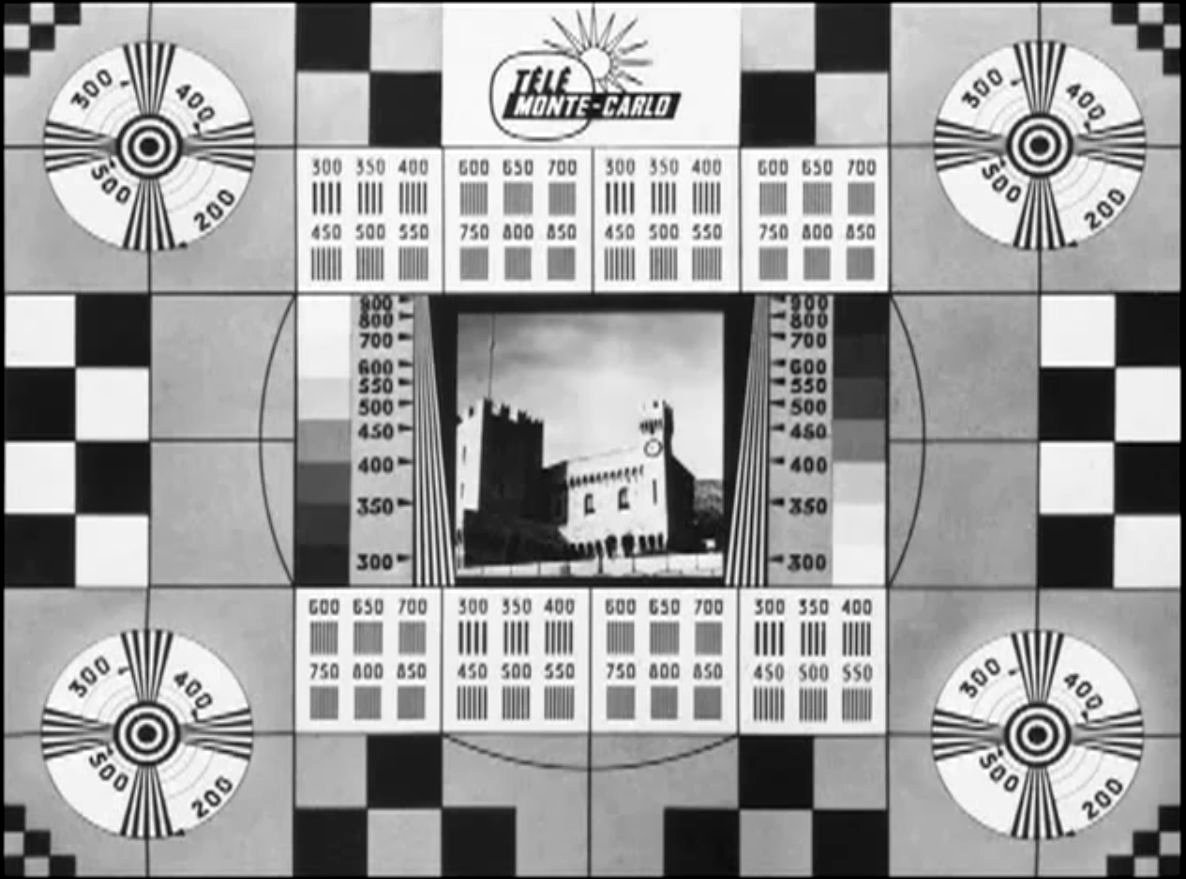
Test pattern of Télé Monte Carlo in 1954, in high definition using the 819-line television standard

Télé Monte-Carlo was inaugurated on November 19, 1954, (the National Day of Monaco) by Prince Rainier with Charles Michelson and Henri de France. TMC was the second private television channel in Europe, after Telesaar began broadcasting in Saarland in February of that year. Antennas are jointly owned by the Ranier's company and Images et Son. The channel was temporarily headquartered at 16 Boulevard Princesse-Charlotte in Monte-Carlo, a TV studio with telecine equipment designed by Henri de France. It broadcast in 50 kilowatts from a panel antenna on Mont Agel, oriented towards Monaco. VHF channel 10-H (using the 819-line standard assigned by the EBU) could be received on the Côte d'Azur from Saint-Tropez to Menton, parts of Toulon, on Corsica's northern coast, and in Marseille's upper districts. Coverage exceeded initial studies, allowing these French territories to receive television well before the arrival of French Radio and Television. To reach the deep valleys in which band I (41-68 MHz) propagates better than the higher frequency of channel 10 in band III, Monaco was authorized by the EBU to test on channel 2-H French (41.25-52.40 MHz) with the same power; the tests were inconclusive. The 1960 commission of RTF's Bastia transmitter on the same channel, risking interference from TMC's Mont Agel transmitter, ended TMC's dual broadcasts in bands I and III. TMC produced its first Eurovision broadcast, the wedding of Prince Rainier and American actress Grace Kelly, in 1956.

=== Sofirad subsidiary (1958-1972) ===
The company controlling Télé Monte-Carlo became a 32-percent subsidiary of Europe No. 1 (controlled by Sofirad) in 1958, distinguishing itself from Radio Monte-Carlo (which belonged to Sofirad, the parent company). It operated Télé Monte-Carlo under a 1952 agreement with Radio Monte-Carlo, which held broadcasting rights in Monaco. Télé Monte-Carlo offered two 20-minute news bulletins (Télé-Soir at 8:00 p.m. and Télé-Dernière at 10:15 p.m.) and Club Tintin, a children's program.

Denise Fabre began her career in 1961 as an announcer on the channel until December 1963. The channel rebranded itself as TMC in 1963, with Jacques Antoine director of programs until 1977. The game-show creator produced several game shows, including The Mysterious Object (forerunner of Schmilblick). The channel's schedule consisted of game shows, new series and evening films. Unlike French television, advertising was permitted except for tobacco and alcohol.

Jean Frydman managed Télé Monte-Carlo's parent company in 1967, becoming manager of the channel two years later. Frydman envisioned a Canal 10 project, a French version of the Monegasque channel, in June 1970. Although French President Georges Pompidou seemed to favor new television channels, it remained at the project stage.

Jean-Pierre Foucault, then a young radio host, made his debut on TMC in 1969. Frydman acquired a large catalog of films to fill the channel's schedule, intending to create France's first national commercial television channel at the beginning of the 1970s. The channel's economic model, inspired by Britain's BBC-ITV model, utilized a substantial television advertising market little used by the public-service ORTF.

Frydman's Canal 10 project, broadcasting TMC in UHF at 625 lines from southern France to Paris, was supported by French Minister of Finance Valéry Giscard d'Estaing. President Pompidou, a supporter of ORTF, opposed it. During a 1971 dispute about PAL and SÉCAM standards in Italy, French industrialists unsuccessfully urged to Pompidou to authorize TMC to broadcast from the ORTF transmitter in Bastia in Italian and in color using the SÉCAM standard towards Rome and the Italian coast to encourage Italians to purchase SÉCAM sets.

Tests in SÉCAM color intended for Italy were made in June 1971 with the establishment of the 50-kW channel 35 UHF. TMC broadcast experimental programs in Italian on this channel in 1973, and it became Tele Monte Carlo the following year.

=== In color under Sofirad (1973-1987) ===
On December 24, 1973, TMC first broadcast in color on the SÉCAM standard on VHF channel 10 (converted from the 819-line standard to the 625-line format, receivable from Saint-Tropez to Menton) and on the new UHF channel 30 (with receptionfrom Cannes to Menton). An Italian version of Télé Monte-Carlo went on the air from Monaco on August 5, 1974.

On January 15, 1975, the Télé Monte-Carlo board of directors decided to broadcast TMC in the Milan region from a transmitter on Corsica. In December 1976, Europe 1 (Images et Son) acquired 22 percent of the company operating Télé-Monte-Carlo from the magazine Jours de France. Europe 1 then controlled 54 percent of Télé Monte-Carlo; the other shareholders were Publicis S.A. (27.5 percent) and the Principality of Monaco (18.5 percent). The principality was reluctant to approve the station's privatization.

=== Financial difficulties (1988–1993) ===
TMC began a period of financial difficulties, and its broadcast day was reduced. Michèle Navadic was recruited as program director from RTL Télévision to rebuild the station's schedule. and TMC Sport.

In March 1992, despite takeover proposals by Havas, Alcatel and NRJ, the Monegasque government indefinitely postponed the privatization of RMC and its television subsidiary, TMC. Since the beginning of the 1980s, RMC made increasingly-significant financial contributions to its television subsidiary. Monaco bought the RMC building for 385 million Monégasque francs.

RMC sold its stake in Télé Monte-Carlo to Sofirad for 40 million francs, which was half-owned by Sofirad and half by Monaco. TMC was separated from RMC by Monte-Carlo Radiodiffusion (MCR), created to manage Monegasque transmitters and frequencies.

=== Regional channels (late 1993 – 2001) ===
All neighboring countries have large regional channels: why not us? TMC is the Southern channel

— Michel Thoulouze in July 1995, speaking for Libération

TMC was a member of the European Broadcasting Union as a part of Radio Monte-Carlo (RMC) until 1995. AB Groupe and Fidimages, a subsidiary of the Compagnie Générale d'Images belonging to Générale des Eaux, founded the Monegasque Program Company of Ondes (MDO) and signed an agreement on September 14, 1993, with the Monegasque government to ensure production of the channel's programs and benefit from advertising revenue. On October 1 of that year, MDO tasked Canal+ subsidiary Ellipse Cable with reviewing TMC's programming. The revamped channel was launched on October 13.

Ellipse Cable general manager Michel Thoulouze planned the return of La Cinq, which had disappeared from the French national terrestrial network on April 12, 1992, as Monte-Carlo TMC. The channel used the Canal+ group's film catalog. In July 1995, Canal+ and German group CLT-UFA bought 47.5 percent of MDO from Générale d'images. Générale d'images retained 47.5 percent, and AB Groupe retained the remaining five percent.

TMC lost money, like all special-interest channels except Planète. According to Canal+ management, Monte-Carlo TMC (the southern channel) positioned itself as family-friendly with an eye to future satellite digital packages. In addition to its terrestrial and cable footprint in France, Monte-Carlo TMC was part of 80 percent of cable networks in French-speaking Switzerland. The channel found a wider audience; it had a three-percent market share, third among cable and satellite channels in 1997 and fourth in 1998. Its format, developed by Thoulouze, remained almost unchanged from 1993 to 2002. Before obtaining a national digital terrestrial license, its French transmitter network operated in Marseille on channels 35 and 51; in Toulon on channel 33; in Avignon on channel 57, and in Nimes on channel 58.

=== National channel (2002-2004) ===
Logo, February 16, 2009 – September 12, 2016

Pathé acquired 50 percent of Télé Monte-Carlo via Sofirad, which was liquidated by France, in January 2002. Two months later, the Canal+ group recovered the Pathé Sport channel after an exchange of shares with Pathé. The channel's (renamed TMC) new deputy general director and program director Gérald-Brice Viret envisioned it as a general-interest channel for the digital era.

TMC moved to new studios in Quai Antoine-Ier, near the port of Monaco. Pathé applied for a national-channel license on June 17, 2002.

On March 21, 2003, the channel was again rebranded. TMC Monte Carlo was selected by the CSA on June 10 to broadcast unencrypted on national channel 10. Pathé sold its 80-percent stake in the channel on February 10, 2005 for nearly €50 million to the TF1 group (40 percent) and the AB group (40 percent); Monaco retained 20 percent.

=== TF1 management since 2005 ===
TF1 Group bought AB Group's shares in 2010, and became sole shareholder of the channel in June 2016 after acquiring Monaco's shares. Since October 2022, TMC and the TF1 Group's free DTT channels have been accessible free-to-air via the Astra 1 satellite in almost all of continental Europe and North Africa.

== Programming ==
TMC airs a variety of programmes, including a number of imports. It produces original programming which includes news magazines and cooking and talk shows.

=== Series ===
- Downton Abbey
- Saving Grace
- Les filles d'à côté
- Undercover Boss
- MacGyver
- The A-Team
- Law & Order
- Alarm für Cobra 11 - Die Autobahnpolizei
- Army Wives
- Extreme Makeover: Home Edition
- Eleventh Hour
- Agatha Christie's Poirot
- The Case-Book of Sherlock Holmes
- The Return of Sherlock Holmes
- Agatha Christie's Marple
- The Memoirs of Sherlock Holmes
- Une femme d'honneur
- Life
- Psych
- Monk
- Sherlock Yack: Zoo Detective

=== Reality TV ===
- The Parisian Agency: Exclusive Properties
- Secret Story (season 14)

=== Talk show ===
- Quotidien

=== Sports ===
==== Association football ====
- FIFA:
  - FIFA World Cup qualification until 2022 (selected UEFA team (excluding France team) matches (shared with TFX, W9, and L'Équipe), France matches live on TF1 (including finals tournament) and M6)
  - FIFA Women's World Cup (selected matches at the finals tournament only, co-licensed with Canal+)
- UEFA until 2022 (except for Men's Nations League and Women's Champions League until 2021)
  - Men's:
    - UEFA European Championship (selected qualifiers not involving France team only (shared with TFX, W9, and L'Équipe), selected qualifiers and finals (including France team matches) live on TF1 and M6)
    - UEFA Nations League (selected matches (including Finals and excluding France team) (shared with L'Équipe (group stage only), TFX, and W9), France matches live on TF1 and M6)
    - Friendly matches (selected matches (including one France team in June 2019) (shared with TFX, W9 and L'Équipe), France matches live on TF1 and M6)
  - Women's:
    - UEFA European Championship (selected matches at the finals tournament only, co-licensed with Canal+)
    - UEFA Champions League (final only, licensed from Canal+)

==== Motorsports ====
- Formula 1 (Monaco and French Grand Prixs and two other races live on TF1, licensed by Canal+)

==== Rugby ====
- Rugby World Cup (shared with TF1 in 2019)

==== Handball ====
- IHF Men's and Women's World Championships (France matches at the finals tournament that not aired by TF1 only (if qualified) until 2025, licensed from beIN Sports)
- EHF Men's and Women's European Championships (France matches at the finals tournament that not aired by TF1 only (if qualified) until 2024, licensed from beIN Sports)

==== Tennis ====
- Davis Cup (French matches only since 2019 finals, licensed from beIN Sports)
