= TF1 =

French television channel

- Current logo since 2013
- Type: Commercial broadcaster
- Country: France
- Headquarters: TF1 Tower, Quai du Point-du-Jour, Boulogne-Billancourt

Programming
- Language: French
- Picture format: SDTV 576i; HDTV 1080i; UHDTV 4K
- Timeshift service: TF1 +1

Ownership
- Owner: TF1 Group
- Sister channels: List: Histoire TV; La Chaîne Info (LCI); Série Club; TF1 Séries Films; TFX; TMC; TV Breizh; Ushuaïa TV

History
- Launched: 26 April 1935; 91 years ago (first predecessor channel/present; as TF1)
- Founder: Georges Mandel; Jean Cazeneuve (as TF1)
- Former names: Radio-PTT Vision (1935–1937); RN Télévision (1937–1939); Fernsehsender Paris (1943–1944); Télévision Française (1944–1945); RDF (1945–1949); RTF (1949–1963); Première chaîne de la RTF (1963–1964); Première chaîne de l'ORTF (1964–1975); TF1 (Télévision Française 1) (1975 - 1987)

Links
- Website: tf1.fr

Availability

Terrestrial
- TNT: Channel 1 (HD)

TF1 (French: [te ɛf œ̃]; standing for Télévision Française 1) is a French commercial television network owned by TF1 Group, controlled by the Bouygues conglomerate. TF1's average market share of 24% makes it the most popular domestic network.

TF1 is part of the TF1 Group of mass media companies, which also includes the news channel LCI. It previously owned the satellite TV provider TPS, which was sold to Canal+ Group.

The network is a supporter of the Hybrid Broadcast Broadband TV (HBBTV) initiative, promoting and establishing an open European standard for hybrid set-top boxes for the reception of terrestrial TV and broadband multimedia applications with a single user interface.

== History ==
=== First years ===
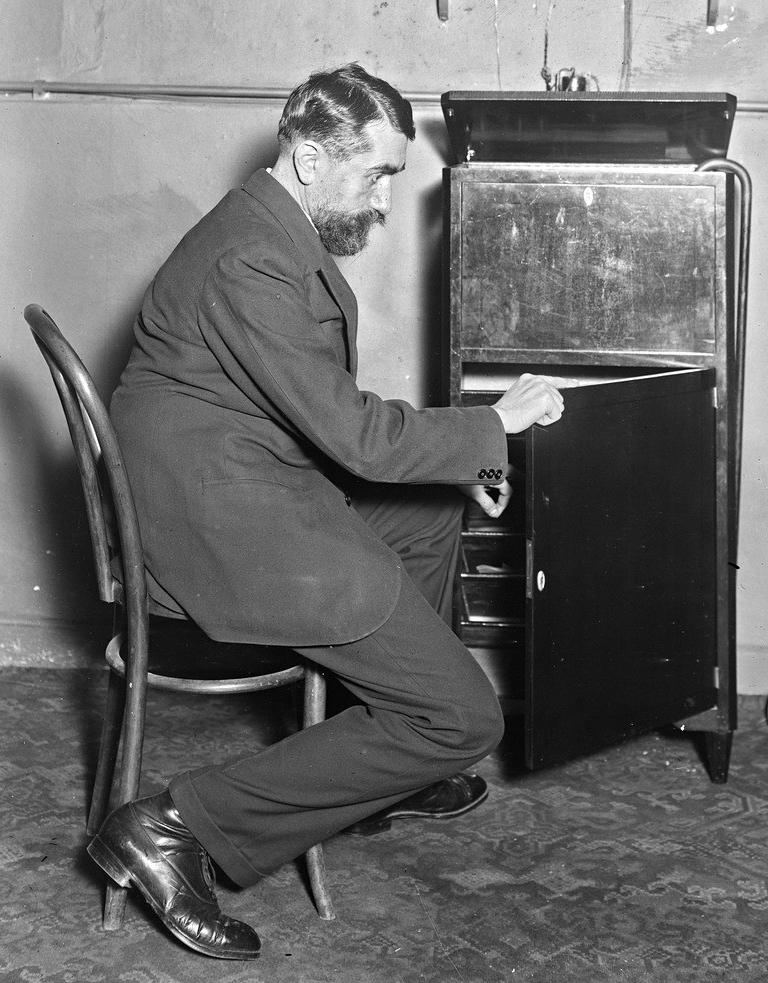
René Barthélemy with his 1931 television set

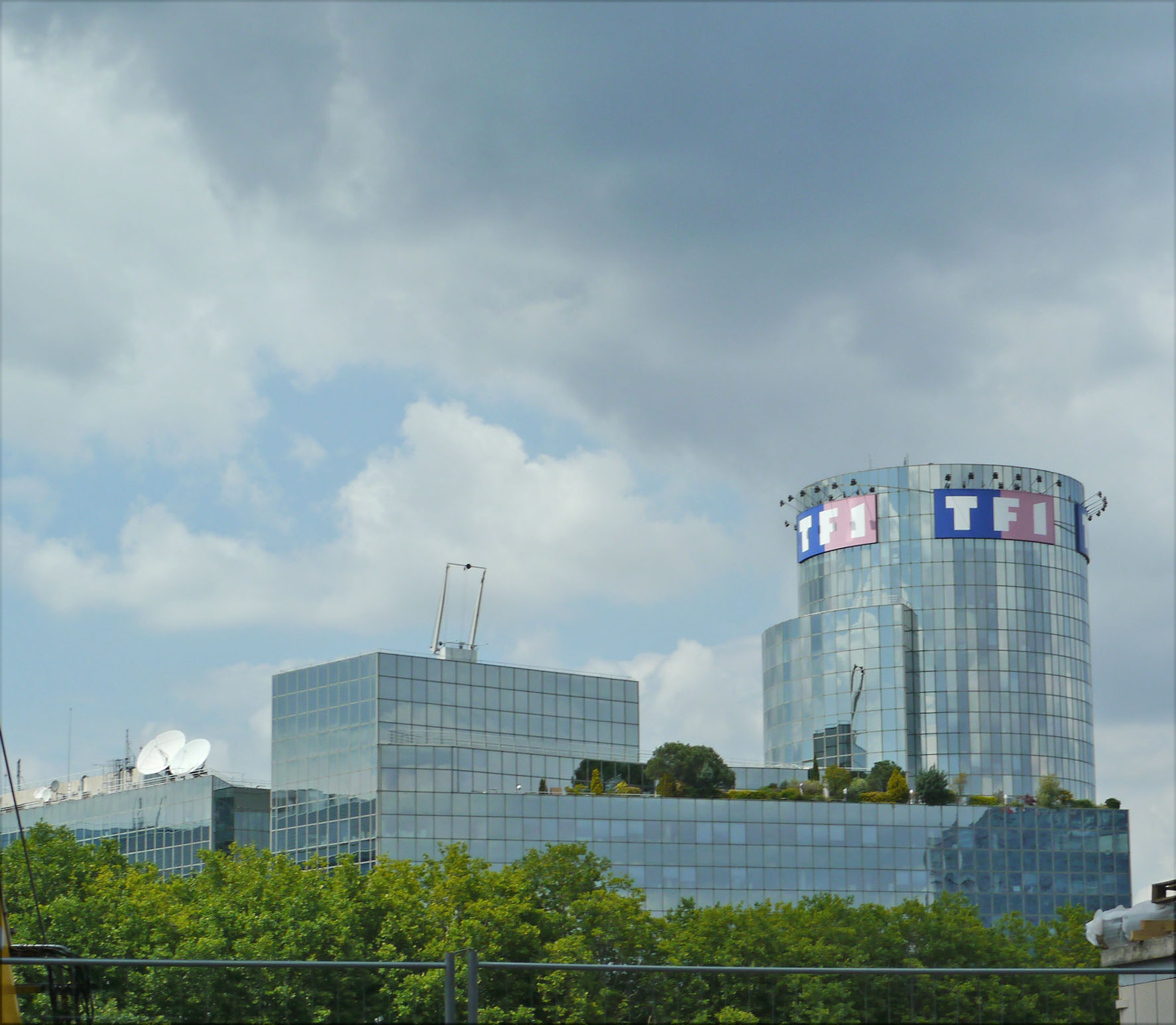
TF1 building, Boulogne-Billancourt, 27 June 2013

The government operated the sole television channel in France for 28 years. It was created as Radiovision-PTT on 26 April 1935, making it among the oldest television stations in the world, and one of the very few prewar television stations to remain in existence to the present day.

The first public demonstration of a 30-line mechanical television took place on 14 April 1931. The image rendering was an improvement upon Baird's thanks to the development of the "moving light point" system and the use of a camera with Weiller mirror drums by the engineer René Barthélemy, head of the radio laboratory of the Compagnie des compteurs (CdC) of Montrouge. In charge of French broadcasting, the PTT administration carried out some rudimentary television experiments from December 1931 by broadcasting experimental 30 to 45 minute broadcasts at variable times from Monday to Saturday with Baird equipment from the medium wave transmitter of Radio PTT. The Barthélemy system was officially adopted in preference to that of Baird, due to the greater stability of the images, for the continuation of experimental transmissions in 1932.

The Minister of the PTT, Henri Queuille, then authorised the Compagnie des compteurs to continue its experiments using the PTT superior school transmitter located at 103 rue de Grenelle in the 15th arrondissement of Paris and assigned the company a rudimentary studio at number 93 of the same street. Barthélemy continued his experiments there with a new disc camera from Nipkow which offered much better shooting possibilities than with the previous system. The programs were broadcast in 30 lines on Tuesday and Friday at 5:00 pm by two transmitters, the images by the medium wave transmitter of the higher school of the PTT on the wavelength of 431 meters and the sound by the transmitter of the Compagnie des compteurs in Montrouge connected to the studio by a telephone line. These experimental broadcasts only reached a very limited public of amateurs of technical innovation who tinkered with receivers connected to a radio, thus constituting a radiovision receiver.

At the same time, the BBC Television Service had been broadcasting an experimental but regular television service since 22 August 1932, with broadcasts taking place Monday to Friday from 11.00 a.m. to 11.30 a.m., and at night on medium wave on 205 meters after BBC radio programmes closed down for the night. The new French Minister of the PTT of the Flandin Government, Georges Mandel, during a visit to the general manager of the British Broadcasting Corporation at the end of 1934, attended a live broadcast of the Epsom Derby on a televisor built by John Logie Baird.

Convinced by this demonstration and of the interest of this invention for the future, but also very aware that the ministerial instability must lead him to quickly imprint his mark on the heavy administration of the PTT for which he was responsible by modernizing, Georges Mandel decided to inaugurate as soon as possible a regular and experimental public television service in France. In March 1935, he went to the Compagnie des compteurs to measure the state of progress of the research. René Barthélemy gave him a demonstration of his new mechanical disc camera with 60 lines of definition (25 images per second), his new telecine (of which he was the inventor) with 180 lines, as well as a receiver with 60 cathode ray tube lines; a tube for which the Compagnie des compteurs has just launched production. He also informed him of his ongoing work on a 180-line camera.

Pressed to carry out his project, the minister granted Barthélemy the means requested for his success. The amphitheater of the PTT superior school, located in the premises of the Ministry of Posts and Telecommunications at 103 rue de Grenelle, was converted into a television studio on 17 April 1935 and its bleachers were dismantled to enlarge it. The CdC's 60-line mechanical camera was placed in the adjoining room, behind double-thick insulating glass to mask the sound of the motor spinning the camera disk. This same room also housed the 60-line, 500-watt transmitter designed by the Compagnie des compteurs. The project provided for a short wave transmitter on the Eiffel Tower and a definition of 180 lines in the long term, as soon as Barthélemy had finalized his work.

One thousand guests of the Minister, personalities, journalists and industrialists flocked to the studio at 103 rue de Grenelle on Friday, 26 April 1935 to attend the first official regular French television broadcast transmitted by radio with a definition of 60 lines3. At 8:15 pm, on the small greenish screen appeared the face of the actress and friend of the minister, Béatrice Bretty, member of the Comédie-Française, with at her side, Jean Toscane, the most famous voice of Radio PTT, and René Barthélemy. Lips and eyes made up in black for the needs of television broadcasting, Miss Bretty recounted of her last tour in Italy with the troupe: "We had a great trip...". These were the first words broadcast on French television. This first television program was broadcast live until 8:30pm on the 175-meter medium-wave frequency within a radius of 100 km (60 miles). Radiovision-PTT, the first French television channel, had just been born.

Radiovision-PTT began operations on 26 April 1935 as the first television station in France, using a 30-line mechanical television system based on the Nipkow disk. It was operated by the French PTT agency with a transmitter located atop the Eiffel Tower, and was on air three days a week from 11 am to 11:30 am and 8 pm to 8:30 pm and on Sundays from 5:30 pm to 7:30 pm. On 4 January 1937, the broadcasting hours were changed such that television programmes were aired from 5 pm until 10 pm on Wednesdays to Fridays, and from 4 pm to 8:30 pm or 9 pm on Saturdays to Tuesdays.

Impressed by the sharpness of the 60-line images obtained from the cathode-ray tube control receiver during this broadcast, Georges Mandel gave the PTT technicians and René Barthélemy six months to set up the necessary installations for regular public broadcasting in 180 lines. Two months late, the official inauguration of 180-line television took place on Sunday, 8 December 1935, from 5:30pm to 7:30pm in front of the press, at the Radiovision-PTT studio at 103, rue de Grenelle in Paris, with a gala session combining excerpts from plays, comic operas, poems, songs and sketches performed by many famous comedians and music-hall artists invited by Béatrice Bretty, and whose numbers were announced at the screen by Suzy Wincker, the first official continuity announcer, on the air since June.

The rue de Grenelle studio required 50,000 lux of light to compensate for the insufficient sensitivity of the 180-line mechanical camera with a double-spiral Nipkow disk rotating at 50 rotations per second. The dissipation of the heat of this very violent lighting was annoying and even dangerous for the artists. This is why a forced-air refrigeration system (temperature and humidity) was installed in the studio to lower its temperature from 55 to 25 °C (130 °F to 75 °F) by means of six aerators. The images filmed in the studio were routed live by a 2,500 meter (1½ mile) long telephone cable to a new transmitter designed by SFR-CSF and temporarily located at the north pillar of the Eiffel Tower, from where a feeder connected it to the four 2 kW shortwave transmitting antennas located at the top of the tower 320 meters (1050 feet) high and which can be received 100 km (60 miles) around Paris. The sound was transmitted in medium wave on the frequency of 206 meters (675 feet) by the transmitter of Radio Tour Eiffel.

Large crowds gathered in front of the receivers installed at the Conservatoire national des arts et métiers at 292 rue Saint-Martin, at the National Tourist Office on the Champs-Élysées, at the Salon de la France d'Outre-Mer at the Grand Palais, at the Maison de la Chimie, and at the town hall of the 5th arrondissement of Paris, which simultaneously broadcast the images in 180 lines. When Barthélemy's Emyvisor from EMYRADIO was put on sale at the end of 1935, it was too expensive (8,000 to 10,000 francs at the time) for most consumers to afford.

Robert Jardillier, new PTT Minister of the Popular Front, launched on 24 October 1936 a call for tenders from radio-electric manufacturers in order to provide television with higher definition equipment exploiting the possibilities offered by the iconoscope and electronic television. Already exploited by the British, Germans and Americans. A test period would enable the best standard to be chosen.

The broadcasts became regular from 4 January 1937 with broadcast from 11am to 11:30am and from 8pm to 8:30pm on weekdays and from 5:30pm to 7:30pm on Sundays. The Deputy Secretary General for Broadcasts, Wladimir Porché, brought the greatest French artists, such as Sacha Guitry, Serge Lifar and Maurice Chevalier, to the cameras of the Radiovision-PTT studio. At that time, there were only about 100 individual television receivers.

Grammont Radio-Télévision carried out its tests in 441 lines, the Compagnie française de télévision (association of the Compagnie des compteurs and SFR-CSF) in 450 lines and Thomson-Houston in 455 lines. The PTT administration chose the 455-line high-definition equipment manufactured by Thomson for public demonstrations at the 1937 Paris Exposition Internationale des Arts et Techniques dans la Vie Moderne, which was then transferred to the Radiovision-PTT studio for testing.

=== Radiodiffusion nationale Télévision ===
Following successful trials of a "high-definition" 455-line electronic television system designed by Thomson-Houston which improved on the 405-line system originally designed by EMI-Marconi, Radio-PTT Vision renamed itself as Radiodiffusion nationale Télévision (RN Télévision) in July 1937. However, broadcasts using the Nipkow disk system continued alongside the new electronic system until 10 April 1938. In July 1938, a decree of the French PTT agency fixed the French terrestrial television standard as transmitting on 455 lines VHF (46 MHz, positive modulation, 25 frames per second), to be adopted throughout France within three years. The adoption of the electronic standard marked the end of mechanical television in France, and the advent of electronic television to obtain much better image quality.

While the BBC Television Service was able to broadcast the arrival of the President of the French Republic Albert Lebrun in London for his official visit on 21 March 1939, RN Télévision was otherwise unable to film a single image. The Minister of the PTT Alfred Jules-Julien thus promised on 31 March a bus equipped for remote reporting in the open air within two weeks, a new television studio and programs broadcast in the evening after dinner.

The administrative system of public broadcasting was modified by a decree of 29 July 1939 signed by the President of the Council Édouard Daladier, making French Broadcasting, and therefore the television service attached to it, a State monopoly which ceased to depend on the Ministry of PTT to pass under the administration of the National French Radio, newly created for this purpose, endowed with an autonomous budget and placed directly under the authority of the President of the council.

=== World War II ===
The rue de Grenelle studio closed permanently on July 31, 1939. Radiodiffusion nationale Télévision then only broadcast films, documentaries and news via its Grammont telecine and identified itself with the callsign Télé-Cinéma Radiodiffusion nationale. When France entered World War II on 3 September 1939, military authorities ordered the cessation of broadcasts and took control of the Eiffel Tower transmitter. The French hardly noticed it because there were no more than 300 receiving stations throughout the territory, which were also watched in a few rare public places. A few broadcasts were still broadcast episodically for transmitter maintenance purposes, but these were not advertised in the press so that the Germans could not use the transmitter signal to locate and bombard Paris. On 6 June 1940, technicians from RN Télévision sabotaged the transmitter to make it unusable by the Germans who were at the gates of Paris.

The German occupying forces initially took no interest in the Eiffel Tower transmitter until an order in May 1941, aimed at reducing transmission sites in the occupied zone in order to recover raw materials, and thus recover certain elements of the French 455-line transmitter of interest to Telefunken lead to discussions on the rehabilitation and use of this transmitter for television. Opposed to this dismantling, Kurt Hinzmann, German television pioneer and former director of the programs of Berlin's Fernsehsender Paul Nipkow television station, who succeeded in convincing the German authorities to continue the broadcast of the programs of the station during the war by proposing its use to entertain and distract the war wounded in hospitals, took up this idea to apply it to the French capital and thus save the Parisian transmitter. He recommended putting the Eiffel Tower transmitter back into service to broadcast a television channel intended to entertain the German soldiers hospitalized in the Kriegslazarette in Paris. In addition, this television channel would open up the French market to the German electrical industry by adopting the German 441-line broadcasting standard developed by Telefunken. Finally, from a military point of view, the repair of this transmitter could allow it to be used as a jammer for enemy planes.

By order of the Oberkommando der Wehrmacht to the Ministry of PTT on 20 May 1942, the work to restore the transmitter in the Eiffel Tower to service was entrusted to the Compagnie des comptes de Montrouge and the German firm Telefunken, following a collaboration agreement between the two companies to jointly build the technical infrastructure of this new television channel. The equipment of the Compagnie des Compteurs being considered uninteresting, Telefunken supplied the new television transmitter to the German standard of 441 lines, recovered from the Reichspost in Germany, and which was installed by technicians from Berlin.

Fernsehsender Paris (Paris-Télévision) moved into a large 3,000-seat ballroom, a remnant of the former Magic-City amusement park closed in 1926, unused since the start of the war. This installation made it possible to start the programs on a regular basis on 7 May 1943 only in telecine, because the work on the V-shaped stage, allowing the cameras to be moved back for wider shots, had not been completed. It broadcasts in German and French four days a week from 10 am to noon, three days from 3pm to 8pm and every evening from 8:30pm to 10pm, broadcasting variety shows and theater for field hospitals (Kriegslazarett) of the Wehrmacht installed in the Paris region and German residents in Paris (about 1,000 receivers, including a hundred for French viewers). The station was officially inaugurated on 30 September 1943 with the start of live broadcasts.

A week before the liberation of Paris, Fernsehsender Paris ceased broadcasting on Saturday 12 August 1944 at 11:30 p.m. On 17 August, the order was given to Hinzmann to blow up the Eiffel Tower's transmitter, which he refused, contenting himself with firing a few symbolic shots into unimportant equipment. The Germans left the studios, leaving the French with a fully operational and among the most efficient television station in the world, which enabled French television to be the first in Europe to resume its broadcasts from the old studio and with the equipment from Fernsehsender Paris, from 1 October 1944 intermittently and in closed circuit test transmissions, because the Americans had administered the Eiffel Tower at the time and prohibited the use of its transmitter until 1 October 1945.

Television broadcasts in France resumed on 1 October 1944 under the name Télévision française, and following the creation of Radiodiffusion française on 23 March 1945, the television service was renamed as RDF Télévision française. Following the return of the Eiffel Tower to the French precisely one year (1 October 1945) after the restart, the official resumption of television broadcasts took place with one hour of programming each day. On 20 November 1948, the Secretary of State for Information, François Mitterrand, decreed the adoption of the 819-line high-definition VHF standard, which was in use from 1949 until 1983.

=== RTF Télévision ===
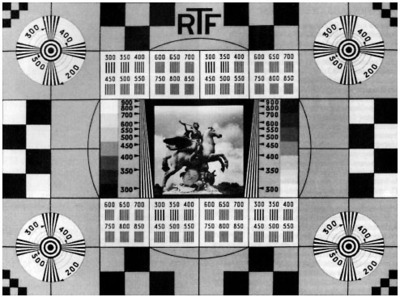
"Marly Horses" 819-line test card used in France from 1953 to 1983. This variant was also used in French Algeria from 1956 to 1962.

Radiodiffusion française was renamed as Radiodiffusion-télévision française (RTF) on 9 February 1949, and thus began the growth of television as an accepted mass medium in France. RTF was also the first channel in the world to air footage of a Pope, on 17 April 1949, with a film sent from the Vatican of Pope Pius XII talking about the potential of television. On 29 May 1949, the first news programme aired on RTF TV, and on 30 July 1949 a television licence fee was introduced. Residents living outside Paris could view RTF TV for the first time in February 1952 when Télé Lille (now known as France 3 Nord-Pas-de-Calais), a regional broadcaster operating since 10 April 1950, was co-opted into the RTF TV network and became RTF's first relay outside Paris. Still as of 1954, RTF's terrestrial network consisted of only three stations reaching 90,000 television sets, while West Germany had set up nine stations by year-end 1953. Its programming was also seen to be stale, with an excessive amount of old movies (120 per year), "stale" newsreels, poor lighting, lack of sport and star performers. Famed French singer of the time Maurice Chevalier actually made his first television appearance in the United Kingdom, as opposed to France. RTF television services were also extended to French Algeria in 1956, which later became TV1 Algeria upon Algerian independence in 1962.

=== ORTF era ===
Following the creation of RTF Télévision 2 (now France 2) in 1964, the first channel was renamed as Première chaîne de la RTF (First Channel of the RTF). With the creation of the ORTF on 25 July 1964, the channel was renamed again to Première chaîne de l'ORTF (First Channel of the ORTF). This period marked the introduction of commercial advertising on 1 October 1968. On 8 January 1969, the ORTF created a subsidiary company called Régie française de publicité (RFP) to handle all advertising on the ORTF channels. The RFP held a monopoly on French TV advertising until the launch of privately owned TV channels in France in the 1980s, and was eventually liquidated in 1993.

=== TF1 era ===
==== Public-owned (1975–1987) ====
TF1, which originally stood for Télévision française 1 (French Television 1), was created on 1 January 1975 when law 74-696 of 7 August 1974, splitting the ORTF into seven separate organisations, came into effect. The name TF1 was a recommendation of the European Broadcasting Union, who demanded the television unit of the former ORTF rebranded as Télévision Française, with the channels being renamed TF1, TF2 and TF3. However, the fact that the three channels were to be independent caused TF1 to become the only channel to use the proposed Télévision Française name. The rebranding to the new name came into effect on 6 January 1975. TF1 adopted a multicoloured logo and cel-animated idents created by Catherine Chaillet, and from 1976 until 1985, analogue computer-generated idents produced using the Scanimate system were also used, created by the American company Robert Abel and Associates with background music composed by Vladimir Cosma. The 1975 TF1 logo was later modified in 1984 and again in 1987.

Colour television was first introduced to TF1 on 1 September 1975 when FR3 (now France 3) agreed to supply some of its colour programming to TF1, and the conversion to colour on TF1 was completed in 1977, though the old 819-line analogue network remained entirely black-and-white until it was decommissioned in 1983. Since TF1's privatisation in April 1987, the abbreviation is no longer expanded, so as to avoid confusion with the current public television broadcaster France Télévisions.

==== Private-owned (1987–present) ====
From 1984 to 1986, the French television landscape evolved significantly with the launch of three private television channels: Canal+, La Cinq and TV6. In March 1986, the Chirac government decided to privatize one of the three public channels. Although initial reports had suggested Antenne 2 (now France 2), on 14 May the government announced that TF1 was selected. The channel was therefore more apt to confront with competition, but still considered left-leaning by the right-wing majority. In April 1987, the construction conglomerate Bouygues won the resulting auction for the sale of TF1. On 16 April, its president, Francis Bouygues, presented a check of three billion francs to the government, completing the privatisation of TF1.

TF1's current logo was unveiled on 2 February 1990. It launched a news network, La Chaîne Info (LCI), in 1994.

The channel was available in Italy alongside LCI on digital terrestrial television from 2004 to December 2006 on Dfree multiplex. In 2005, TF1 launched TF1 Vision, a video on demand service.

On 20 May 2021, it was announced that TF1 Group, owners of the channel, proposed a merger with Groupe M6, which owns M6. On 16 September 2022, it was announced that the merger was officially abandoned.

Since October 2022, the free DTT channels of the TF1 Group have been accessible free to air via the Astra 1 satellite. This broadcast follows a temporary interruption in encrypted broadcasting to Canal+ and TNTSAT subscribers, following a commercial dispute. However, despite the resumption of encrypted broadcasts within the Canal+ and TNTSAT bouquets, this free-to-air broadcasting continues. LCI is therefore received free of charge in almost all of continental Europe.

On 23 November 2024, Sky News reported that CVC Capital Partners, TF1, RedBird Capital Partners, All3Media, Mediawan and Kohlberg Kravis Roberts had been linked to a potential takeover bid for ITV plc and a possible break-up of core assets such as ITV Studios and ITVX. This could have seen the TF1 name launched in the UK, however ITV later confirmed it was in talks to instead sell the TV business to Sky.

== Logo history ==
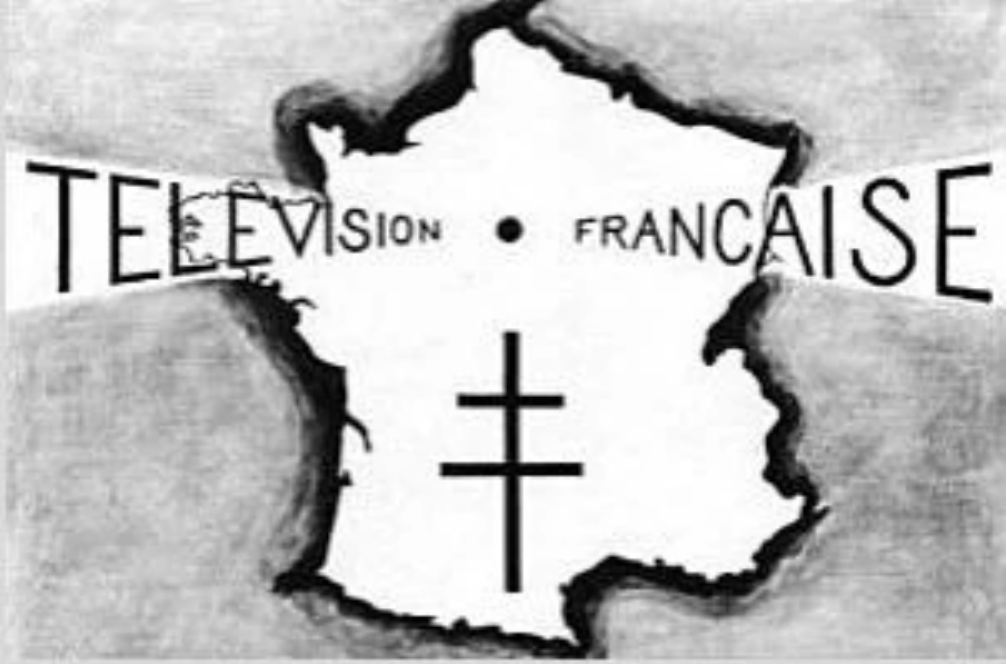
RDF Télévision Française post-war logo from 1945 to 1949.

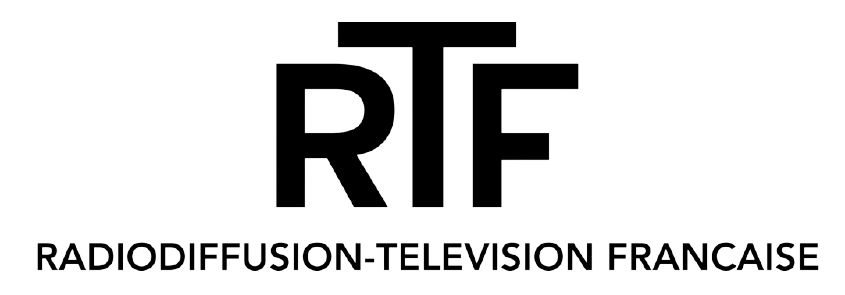
RTF's logo from 1949 to 1959.

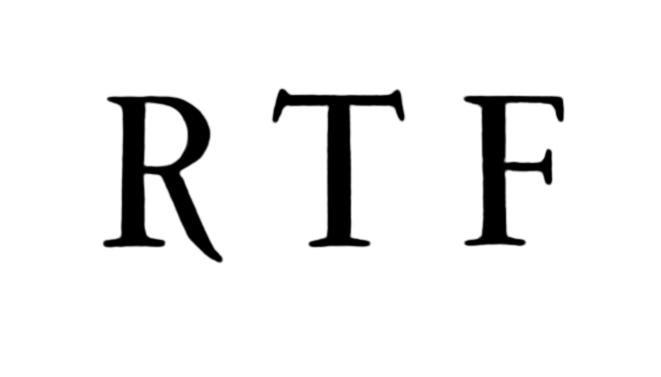
Alternate logo.

RTF logo from 1959 to 1964.

Logo as ORTF from 1964 to 1975.

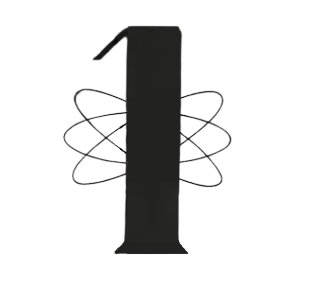
Less used variation from 1972 to 1975.

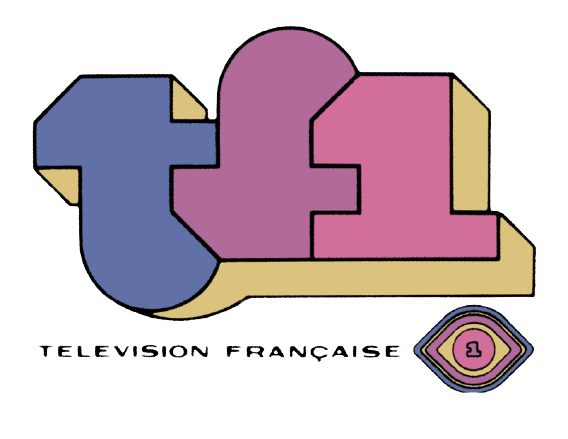
Logo from 1975 to 1985.

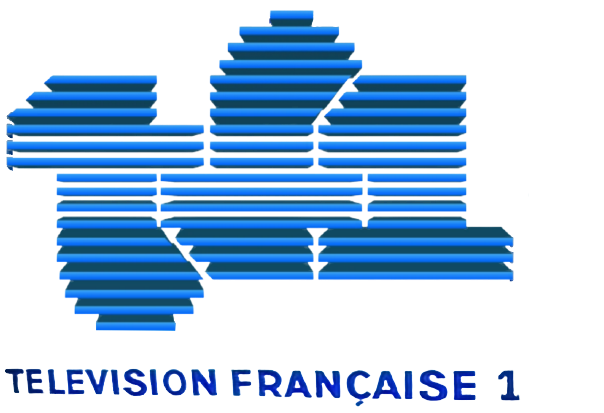
Striped logo from 1985 to 1987.

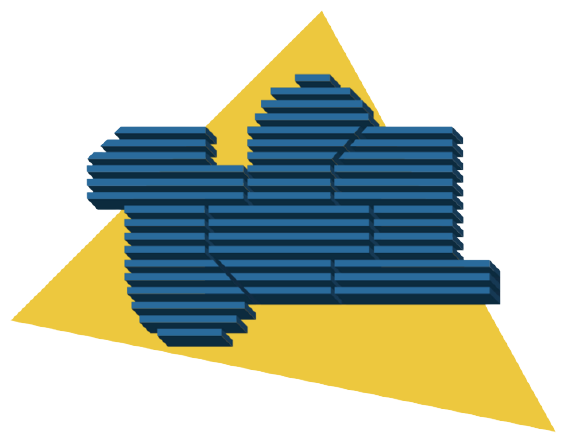
Logo from 1987 to 1990.

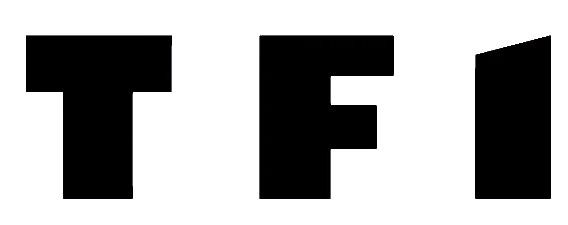
Wordmark used as a transitional logo from 1989 to 1990.

Logo from 1990 to 2006.

Logo from 2006 to 2013.

Current logo since 2013.

== Programmes ==
=== General ===
- Le 13H and Le 20H (main news programmes)
- Bonjour ! La Matinale TF1
- Qui veut gagner des millions?
- Ninja Warrior
- The Voice
- Koh-Lanta
- Star Academy
- Demain Nous Appartient (Tomorrow is Ours) and Ici Tout Commence
- Section de Recherches
- Mask Singer
- Danse avec les stars (Strictly Come Dancing)
- Vendredi tout est permis (VTEP)
- Secret Story (full shows, seasons 1-8 & 12; Live shows only, S9; Inaugural show only, S10-11 & 13-14)

==== Children's television series ====
- Abby Hatcher
- Astro Boy Reboot (upcoming)
- Kikoumba: Crown Down
- Marcus Level
- Miraculous: Tales of Ladybug & Cat Noir
- Paw Patrol (Paw Patrol, La pat'patrouille)
- Rubble & Crew
- Super Wings
- The Smurfs (Les Schtroumpfs)

=== Sports ===
==== Association football ====
- FIFA
  - FIFA World Cup
    - Finals (selected matches (including all France team matches (if qualified)), co-licensed with beIN Sports)
    - Qualifiers (up to five France matches only (other France matches live on M6), other matches not involving France team live on TFX, TMC, W9 and L'Equipe)
  - FIFA Women's World Cup (selected matches at the finals tournament only, co-licensed with Canal+)
- UEFA
  - Men's
    - UEFA European Championship
      - Finals (selected matches, shared with M6 and co-licensed with beIN Sports)
      - Qualifiers (four first pick France matches only, in September 2019 aired a second pick (four second pick and one first pick live on M6), other matches not involving France live on TFX, TMC, W9, and L'Equipe)
    - UEFA Nations League (France away matches only in 2018–19 (home matches live on M6), other matches not involving France live on TFX-TMC-W9 (including Finals) and L'Equipe (group stage only))
    - UEFA Champions League (final only, returned again in 2019–20 until 2023–24, licensed from RMC Sport (2020 and 2021) and Canal+-beIN Sports (2022 until 2024))
  - Women's
    - UEFA European Championship (selected matches at the finals tournament only, co-licensed with Canal+)
- France national football team (selected Nations League, qualifiers, and friendlies, other matches live on M6, in 2019 one friendly match live on TMC

==== Rugby ====
- Rugby World Cup (shared with TMC in 2019)

==== Handball ====
- IHF Men's and Women's World Championships (France matches at the finals tournament only (if qualified) until 2025, licensed from beIN Sports)
- EHF Men's and Women's European Championships (France matches at the finals tournament only (if qualified) until 2024, licensed from beIN Sports)

==== Gridiron football ====
- National Football League (Super Bowl only from 2019, licensed from beIN Sports)

==== Motorsport ====
- Formula One (three races only (including French GP) until 2020 with Monaco GP live on TMC, licensed from Canal+)

==== Ice hockey ====
- Ice Hockey World Championships – Canal+ some matches on TMC and M6

==== Professional wrestling ====
- Professional wrestling in France 1952-1980s, gradually migrated to RTF Télévision 2 after 1964 launch, still occasionally on Première chaîne/ TF1 thereafter
- New Catch, two runs 1988 and 1991, first run repeated and second run premiered on Eurosport 1991-1992 following 1991 buyout by TF1, four sampler episodes of second run broadcast on TF1 late 1991

== Criticism ==
Some commentators accuse TF1 of being an excessively populist, commercialised channel. There is a clear emphasis on "light" entertainment programmes over more serious content, and the channel's success is sometimes seen as being founded on the ménagères de moins de 50 ans (housewives under 50) audience segment. A large proportion of the schedule consists of gameshows, sensational documentaries and dubbed versions of TV series. The channel's news service is perceived as consisting of more celebrity news and human-interest stories than its public-sector competitors.

On 16 April 2009, the employee responsible for the "Web innovation" department was fired for criticizing the HADOPI law in a private email (on 19 February) sent to a Member of Parliament. The management of TF1 was notified about the e-mail by the Ministry for Culture and Communication, whose Minister Christine Albanel is also one of the authors of the HADOPI law.

In 2004, Patrick Le Lay, CEO of TF1 made the following statement about the channel's aims:

There are many ways to speak about TV, but in a business perspective, let's be realistic: at the basis, TF1's job is helping Coca-Cola, for example, to sell its product. What we sell to Coca-Cola is available human brain time. Nothing is more difficult than obtaining this availability. This is where permanent change is located. We must always look out for popular programs, follow trends, surf on tendencies, in a context in which information is speeding up, getting manifold and trivialized.

Critics of TF1 also contend that its news coverage is slanted towards supporting right-wing politicians – they were in particular accused of supporting Édouard Balladur in the 1995 presidential elections, and of overstating crime during the 2002 electoral campaign to tilt the balance in favour of former French president Jacques Chirac, who campaigned on a law and order platform.

Key figures within TF1 are close friends to some of the most powerful politicians in France, and the relationship between Bouygues and the public-sector contracting system often raises suspicions. Immigration and violence are arguably conflated in the channel's news programmes. In addition, it is occasionally alleged that news reports from TF1 tend to ignore issues yielding a bad light on their parent group (Bouygues), while stressing the problems of competitors (such as Vinci SA).

Such criticism was heavy in the satirical show Les Guignols de l'info, broadcast on rival network Canal+. However, TF1 now competes in this category with M6, which was initially a generalist channel focusing on musical programmes, but now has programming more resembling TF1 (notably, reality shows that TF1 started running just after M6 introduced them).

== See also ==
- List of television stations in France
- TF1 Tower
