= TFX (TV channel) =

French television channel

- Country: France

Programming
- Language: French
- Picture format: 1080i HDTV (downscaled to 16:9 576i for the SDTV feed)

Ownership
- Owner: Groupe TF1
- Sister channels: TF1; TMC; TF1 Séries Films; LCI

History
- Launched: March 31, 2005; 21 years ago
- Former names: NT1 (2005–2018)

Links
- Website: tf1.fr/tfx

Availability

Terrestrial
- TNT: Channel 11

TFX (formerly NT1) is a French free television network operated by Groupe TF1, targeting younger audiences.

== History ==
NT1 was proposed in 2002 by AB Groupe for a frequency in the DTT, as a generalist channel inspired by its elders RTL9 and AB1. It was selected on June 10, 2003, for the launch of the TNT platform scheduled for March 2005. In late 2004, AB Groupe announced their intention to call the channel La Quatre (The Four). However, in January 2005, France Télévisions announced that they would rebrand their channel Festival as France 4. AB Groupe decided to revert to the NT1 name.

In June 2009, TF1 Group agreed to buy the channel from AB Groupe, as well as AB's 40% stake in TMC Monte Carlo (which would take TF1's total stake to 80%) and NT1. The deal was cleared by France's competition authority and subsequently by the Council of State in December 2010, dismissing an appeal by Métropole Télévision.

TF1 Group decided to make a number of changes, notably by upgrading NT1 to 16:9 in November 2010. It was the last DVB-T channel to switch to this format. In addition, NT1 became the group's channel for young adults.

On May 19, 2015, the channel launched its version in HDTV.

On May 26, 2015, TF1, TMC, NT1 and HD1 merged their websites and united them on its platform MYTF1.

On October 18, 2017, TF1 Group announced that NT1 will change its name to TFX in 2018. The rebrand took effect at 9pm on 30 January 2018.

On February 28, 2022, as part of the merger of their two groups, TF1 Group and M6 Group announce that they are in exclusive negotiations with Altice Média for the sale of TFX and 6ter.

Since October 2022, TFX, as well as the free DTT channels of the TF1 group, have been accessible free to air, via the Astra 1 satellite. This broadcast follows a temporary interruption in encrypted broadcasting to Canal+ and TNTSAT subscribers, following a commercial dispute. However, despite the resumption of encrypted broadcasts within the Canal+ and TNTSAT bouquets, this free-to-air broadcasting continues. TFX is therefore received free of charge in almost all of Continental Europe.

Since January 8, 2024, as the children programming block TFOU got mostly replaced by a morning show on TF1's weekday schedule, TFOU was moved to TFX on weekdays after 6.55 a.m., sharing the block on the two channels. The move on TFX gave TFOU longer broadcasts on Wednesdays where it airs until 9.30 a.m. rather than 8.30 a.m. for other regular weekdays.

== Logo history ==
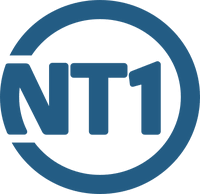
NT1's first logo from 2005 to 2008

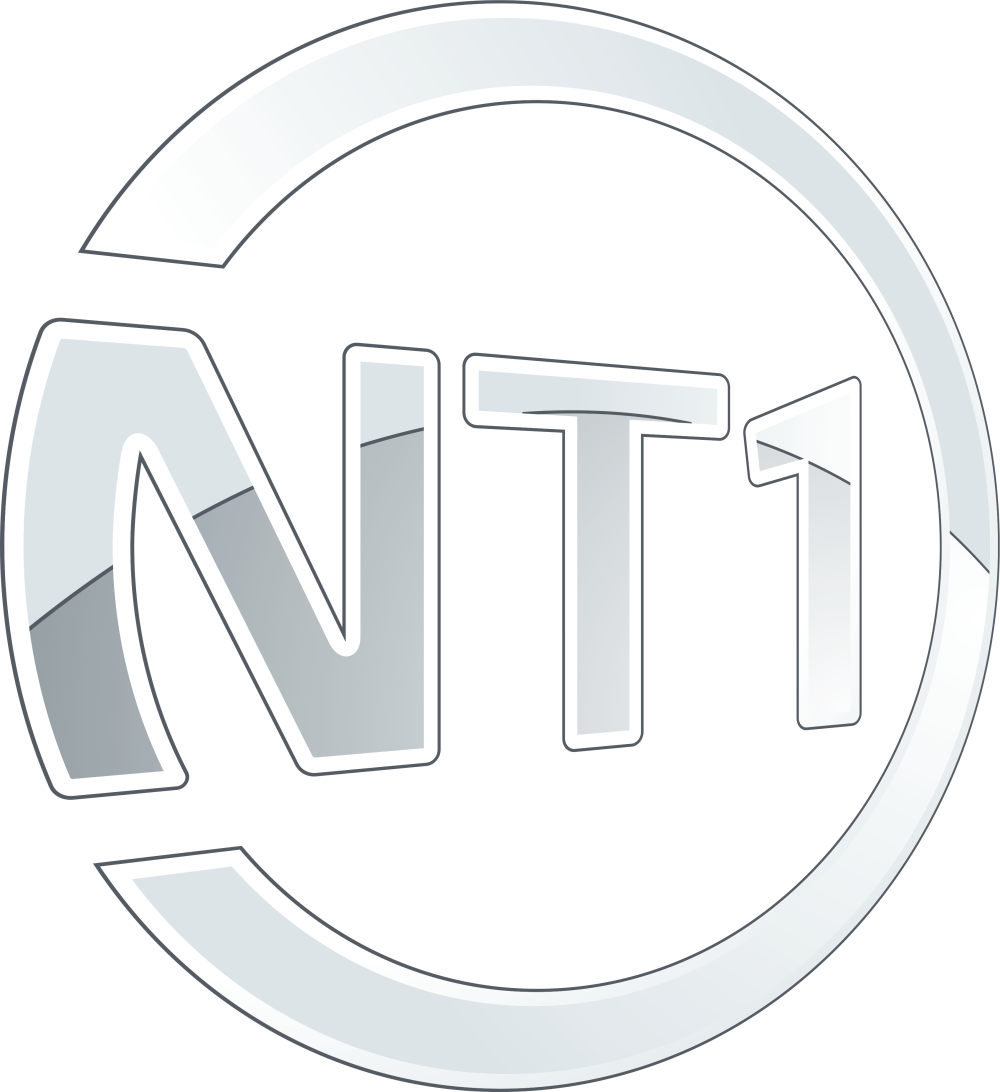
NT1's second logo from 2008 to 2012

NT1's last logo from 2012 to 2018

Current logo since 2018

== Programming ==
=== Series ===
- 2 Broke Girls (rerun, first aired on OCS Happy / OCS Max)
- Are We There Yet?
- Au nom de la vérité (rerun, first aired on TF1 / TF1 Séries Films)
- Charlie's Angels (2011 – rerun, first aired on Canal+ Family)
- Chuck (seasons 2–5 – season 1 in rerun, first aired on TF1)
- Dallas (2012 – seasons 2–3)
- Dragon Ball Z (Uncut Version)
- Falling Skies (rerun, first aired on OCS Max)
- Friends
- Grimm (rerun, first aired on Syfy)
- Gossip Girl (season 3)
- Haven (rerun, first aired on Syfy)
- House of Anubis (rerun, first aired on Nickelodeon)
- How I Met Your Mother (seasons 3–9 – seasons 1–2 in rerun, first aired on Canal+)
- Nikita (rerun, first aired on TF1 – season 1)
- One Tree Hill (seasons 8–9 – seasons 1–7 in rerun, first aired on TF1)
- The Originals (season 1)
- Riverdale (rerun, first aired on Netflix)
- The Secret Circle
- Terminator: The Sarah Connor Chronicles (season 2)
- The Tomorrow People
- True Blood (rerun, first aired on OCS Max / OCS City)
- The Vampire Diaries (seasons 3–5 and 8 – rerun for seasons 1–2, first aired on Canal+ Family, seasons 6–7, first aired on Série Club)
- VDM
- Violetta (rerun, first aired on Disney Channel)
- The Walking Dead (rerun, first aired on OCS Choc)

=== Reality TV ===
- Les Vraies Housewives
- Secret Story (seasons 10-12; daily shows only, season 9)
- Secret Story - After Secrets (seasons 9–12)
- La Villa des cœurs brisés
- On a échangé nos mamans
- Super Nanny
- 10 couples parfaits
- Hell's Kitchen
- Bachelor
- Pascal, le grand frère

=== Entertainment ===
- En mode gossip
- Ma vie à la télé
- Tous différents

=== Children's television series ===
At the launch of NT1 in 2005, it aired children's cartoons in the morning. In the 2010s, NT1 did air live-action programming for children in the morning such as Violetta.

Since January 8, 2024, TFX share the children's programming block TFOU with TF1 on weekdays, airing it from 6.55 a.m. to 8.30 a.m., and until 9.30 a.m. on Wednesdays. On TFX, it can run longer, such as on the public holiday November 11, 2024 when it airs until noon.

- Miraculous: Tales of Ladybug & Cat Noir (Miraculous: les aventures de Ladybug et Chat Noir)
- Paw Patrol (La Pat' Patrouille)
- Super Wings (Super Wings, Paré au décollage!)
- The Smurfs (Les Schtroumpfs)

=== Anime ===
NT1 aired anime since its beginning targeting teens, in the beginning in the after-school slot. Its original owner AB Groupe was an important distributor of anime in France, having produced Club Dorothée, a television block of TF1 from 1987 to 1997 which aired mostly anime which were controversial due to their violence for a children audience.

NT1 and TFX kept airing anime in mornings and weekends. It was the last channel on French DTT to keep some, airing new anime like My Hero Academia, One Piece, Captain Tsubasa and Dragon Ball Super in the late 2010s. Nowadays, it only airs classic anime, as of 2024, Cat's Eyes on Saturday mornings, while an original live-action series based on the manga premieres on November 11, 2024 on TF1.

=== Sports programming ===
On July 24, 2008, the channel announced it would broadcast the 2008–09 A1 Grand Prix events on Sundays. This international racing series was to be shown live or pre-recorded. The deal was confirmed by Richard Maroko, General Programmes Manager of the AB Groupe and Richard Dorfman, A1GP's director of broadcasting.

==== Association football ====
- FIFA World Cup qualification until 2022 (selected UEFA team (excluding France team) matches (shared with TMC, W9, and L'Équipe), France matches live on TF1 (including finals tournament) and M6)
- UEFA until 2022 (except for Nations League until 2021)
  - UEFA European Championship (selected qualifiers not involving France team only (shared with TMC, W9, and L'Équipe), selected qualifiers and finals (including France team matches) live on TF1 and M6)
  - UEFA Nations League (selected matches (including Finals and excluding France team) (shared with L'Équipe (group stage only), TMC, and W9), France matches live on TF1 and M6)
  - Friendly matches (selected matches not involving France team (shared with W9 and L'Équipe), France matches live on TF1, TMC (one match only in 2019), and M6)

==== Motorsport ====
- Moto GP (2008–2015)

==== Wrestling ====
- WWE (2006–2014)
  - Raw
  - Smackdown
