= La Chaîne Info =

LCI
- Country: France

Programming
- Picture format: 1080i HDTV (downscaled to 16:9 576i for the SDTV feed)

Ownership
- Owner: TF1 Group
- Sister channels: TF1; TMC; TFX; TF1 Séries Films

History
- Launched: 24 June 1994; 32 years ago
- Founder: Christian Dutoit; Jérôme Bellay

Links
- Website: TF1 INFO LCI

Availability

Terrestrial
- TNT: Channel 15

Streaming media
- Official website: https://www.tf1info.fr/direct/

La Chaîne Info (LCI; English: "The News Channel") is a French free-to-air news channel. It is part of TF1 Group.

== History ==
TF1 had shown intentions of launching a news channel in 1991, which was one of the potential candidates for a new Astra satellite.

LCI was launched on 24 June 1994 by Christian Dutoit on behalf of the media group TF1 as a pay television channel. Its launch was also simulcast on TF1.

The broadcast began at 8:30 pm with the live TV news programme presented by Françoise-Marie Morel. The first guest was the CEO of the channel, Étienne Mougeotte.

The channel was also broadcast in Italy alongside TF1 on digital terrestrial television from 2004 to December 2006 on Dfree multiplex.

In 2006, the channel's website appeared twice in the James Bond film Casino Royale, a product placement that the channel says it did not pay for.

On 5 April 2016, the channel became free-to-air and began broadcasting on channel 26 via digital terrestrial television in France.

Since October 2022, LCI, as well as the free DTT channels of the TF1 group, have been accessible free to air, via the Astra 1 satellite. This broadcast follows a temporary interruption in encrypted broadcasting to Canal+ and TNTSAT subscribers, following a commercial dispute. However, despite the resumption of encrypted broadcasts within the Canal+ and TNTSAT bouquets, this free-to-air broadcasting continues. LCI is therefore received free of charge in almost all of Continental Europe.

== Programmes ==
=== Current programmes ===
- Le 6/9, weekday morning news programme presented by François-Xavier Ménage and Amandine Bégot (anchors the news), also Audrey Crespo-Mara anchors a political interview and La Vie des Idées.
- La Médiasphère, a technology programme, hosted by Christophe Moulin.
- LCI et vous, late-morning news programme, hosted by Bénédicte Le Chatelier.
- LCI Midi, midday news programme, hosted by Philippe Ballard and Marie-Aline Méliyi.
- Le 15/18, afternoon drive news programme by Magali Lunel.
- 24 heures en questions, roundup, hosted by Yves Calvi + Magali Lunel (weekdays) and Bénédicte Le Chatelier (Saturday).
- Le grand soir, late news programme hosted by Julien Arnaud and Rebecca Fitoussi, replaced LCI Soir.
- LCI Matin Week-end, weekend morning news programme hosted by Sébastien Borgnat and Sylvia Amicone.
- LCI Journée Week-end, weekend block programming from 10am to 6pm by Julien Dommel.
- LCI Soir Week-end, weekend block programming from 6pm to midnight by Damien Givelet and Julie Hammett.
- Le Grand Jury, a political/economic interview programme hosted by Olivier Mazerolle, Alexis Brezet et Christophe Jakubyszyn.
- Le grand journal de 12h - weekend newscasts at noon.

=== Current magazines ===
- Tout un monde (A whole world)
- Au cœur de la course (At the heart of the race)
- Le Live Présidentiel (The Presidential Live)
- 24 heures, la semaine en questions (24 Hours: The Week in Questions)
- Au cœur de nos différences (At the heart of our differences)
- Au cœur des régions (At the heart of the regions)
- Politiquement Show (Political Show)

=== Former programmes ===
- LCI Matin
- Le grand journal de 12h30
- Le grand journal de 18h
- Le grand journal de 18h30
- Le 14/17
- Le 14/16
- Le 17/20
- Le 17/19
- Le 12/14
- Le 18/20
- Questions d'actu
- Le journal du monde
- Le Club LCI
- LCA, La Culture Aussi

== Slogans ==
- 1994-2012: "L'information continue sur LCI" (Continuous news on LCI)
- 2012-2015: "Mieux que savoir, comprendre" (Better than knowing, understanding)
- 2016-2025: "Vous êtes au cœur de l'info" (You are at the heart of the news)
- 2025-Now: "L'info, la vraie" (The news, the real)
