= France.tv =

Online service for on-demand videos from France Télévisions

france.tv
- Logo used since 2022
- Former names: Pluzz (2010 – April 2012); Francetv pluzz (April 2012 – May 2017); Francetv pluzzVAD (May 2012 – May 2017)
- Website type: Video on demand, OTT streaming platform
- Available in: French
- Headquarters: Paris, Île-de-France, France
- Owner: France Télévisions
- Managing director: Encarna Marquez (Director of Digital at France Télévisions)
- Key people: Delphine Ernotte
- Website: Official website
- Launched: 5 July 2010; 16 years ago (Pluzz launched; renamed Francetv pluzz on 30 April 2012); 2 May 2012; 14 years ago (Francetv pluzzVAD launched); 9 May 2017; 9 years ago (the two Francetv pluzz platforms were merged into one under france.tv)

france.tv is a French over-the-top, streaming service operated by public broadcaster France Télévisions. It broadcasts live and on-demand programmes from France Télévisions' channels and other partners, as well as acquired programmes.

The current france.tv was launched on 9 May 2017, as the result of a merger between France Télévisions' catch-up services Francetv pluzz (which launched on 5 July 2010, as Pluzz before being renamed on 30 April 2012), and Francetv pluzzVAD, which launched on 2 May 2012, delivered all of France Télévision's programs via video streaming and download.

== History ==
On 5 July 2010, France Télévisions launched its catch-up TV service called Pluzz. It allows you to watch or rewatch the programs of the group's channels up to one week after their broadcast on a single site. Catch-up TV is available 15 minutes after the program airs. It is also possible to watch live channels. As of 2010, Pluzz was generating approximately 10 million video views per month, according to the latest figures. Since this service is free, advertisements are shown before the videos to finance it. The brand name "Pluzz" is a contraction of the words "Plus", "Play" and "Buzz".

On 30 April 2012, the agencies Quatre and Playgrnd redesigned the site, which on this occasion became Francetv pluzz, adding to the original name Pluzz, the particle Francetv, which unifies the digital services of France Télévisions. On this occasion, the platform is improving its accessibility by offering more subtitles for the deaf and hard of hearing and audio description for the blind and visually impaired. It also adds more interactivity with the integration of social networks Facebook and Twitter (now X). Separately, on 2 May 2012, France Télévisions launched Francetv pluzzVAD, its new video-on-demand service. All of the group's channels' programs can now be rented via streaming or purchased for download. The catalog also includes French and foreign films.

On 9 May 2017, France Télévisions launched the universal platform france.tv, bringing together the websites of its channels as well as its platforms Francetv pluzz and Francetv pluzzVAD in order to simplify the user experience. France Télévisions did this in an effort to compete with two leading rival video on demand services in France, owned by private companies, MyTF1 (now TF1+) and 6play (now M6+). In fact, Ghislain Faribeault, director of the video department at France Télévisions, confirmed in an interview that 300 websites, 40,000 videos, and 5 million internet addresses (URLs) have been closed or migrated to france.tv. Nearly 500 new programs are available every day on the website, while the VOD catalogue adds more than 150 new film and audiovisual releases each month in French or original version with subtitles. By undertaking this profound transformation, the group is finally carrying out its digital adaptation as recommended by France's Court of Auditors in October 2016. The stated objective is clear: the group hopes to double the site's digital traffic, by increasing from 500 million video views each month currently to one billion in 2020; for comparison, the YouTube video platform accumulates nearly one billion views per day.

Following these content removals, the audience for France Télévisions' websites on PC fell from 11.4 million unique visitors in June 2017 to 9.4 million in July, then 7.4 million in August of the same year. Further developments came in the fall of 2017 with the arrival of SVOD (unlimited video on subscription) directly inspired by the Netflix service. The focus is on French and European production, with, for example, exclusive web creations and previews. In October 2019, france.tv partnered with Ici Radio-Canada Télé to add Quebecois programming to the service, including Trop., Les Bogues de la vie, District 31 and Ruptures. The first programs linked to this agreement have been broadcast on the platform since 6 November 2019, with more programmes being added on 16 December 2019.

=== 2020s ===
On 12 September 2022, the program Complément d'enquête broke a record, registering more than 372,000 views of the replay on the platform in 24 hours. On 14 September 2024, Arte France joined the platform.

On 25 March 2025, France Télévisions announced that it would add content from INA, LCP - Assemblée nationale, Public Sénat, TV5 Monde, and France 24 to the platform, to make it the French parallel to BBC iPlayer in the United Kingdom. It was also announced that France Télévisions would extend the "france.tv" branding to its main broadcast television channels beginning 6 June 2025; the channel names would still be used for station identification, but their digital on-screen graphic (DOG) would primarily use the "france.tv" brand. President Delphine Ernotte Cunci stated that the decision was a brand unification effort, citing the BBC as an example. On 29 April 2025, INA joined the platform. On 5 June 2025, the LCP – Assemblée nationale and Public Sénat channels joined the platform. On 2 July 2025, France 24 (French version) joined the platform. On 8 July 2025, TV5 Monde France joined the platform. On 30 September 2025, Mieux joined the platform.

== Channels ==
In addition to content on the france.tv portal, the platform offers digital livestreams of the following channels:

- France 2
- France 3
- France 4
- France 5
- France Info
- La Première
- France.tv Slash (adolescents and young adult channel, since 2018)
- Lumni (educational platform, since 2015)
- Okoo (youth program block, since 2019)
- Culturebox (until 6 June 2025)

At the same time, it offers linear digital channels:

- Culturebox: during the Covid-19 pandemic, then in the evenings and at night on France 4 until 6 June 2025
- France TV Séries (French-language television series, since 22 November 2023): broadcast from 9:00 AM to 12:30 AM
- France TV Docs (French documentaries, since 22 April 2024): broadcast from 9:30 am to 2:00 am
- France TV Paris 2024 (Paris 2024 Olympic Games and 2024 Paralympic Games, from 8 May to 8 September 2024)
- France TV Roland Garros (2025 French Open tennis tournament, from 25 May to 8 June 2025)
- Paris 31, from 25 to 31 December 2025
- France TV Sport (starting with the Milan Cortina 2026 Olympic Games)
- France 24, (French version; from midnight to 6:30 a.m. and this switching from France Info, 7 a.m. and intermittently during the day of 21 June 2025 due to a breakdown), continuously, 24/7, since 2 July 2025. Switchover on France Info to France 24 delayed to 1 a.m. for the Artemis II flight on 2 April 2026.
- Arte France
- INA
- LCP - Assemblée nationale / Public Sénat
- TV5 Monde France
- Mieux

== Platforms and apps ==
The service is accessible on the web, and on iOS, iPadOS, tvOS and Android mobile applications of France Télévisions and its operators, internet boxes from operators, connected televisions, Apple TV, Android TV, Google TV devices, Chromecast or Amazon Fire TV as well as OTT platforms: Molotov and Canal+, formerly MyCanal.

Since July 3, 2025, and almost exactly 15 years after the launch of Pluzz, france.tv has been available via a subscription video-on-demand platform: Amazon Prime Video from Amazon.

== Logos ==
france.tv logo from 9 May 2017 to 28 January 2018

france.tv logo from 29 January 2018 to 28 March 2022

france.tv logo since 29 March 2022

== See also ==
- TF1+
- M6+
- Canal+
- BBC iPlayer
