= Alain de Pouzilhac =

French advertising executive (born 1945)

- Born: Alain du Plessis de Pouzilhac; 1945 (age 80–81); Sète, France
- Occupations: publisher, advertising executive
- Years active: 1968 - present
- Employer(s): France 24 (Government of France)

Alain du Plessis de Pouzilhac (born 1945) is a French advertising executive. He was the CEO of France 24. He was President of France Médias Monde from 2008 to 2012.

He was the President of French rugby club RC Narbonne from 1997 to 2001.

== France Médias Monde ==
In December 2005, he was appointed chief executive of the French international news channel, CFII (France 24).

On 20 February 2008, he was appointed to the post of President of France Médias Monde by the then-French president Nicolas Sarkozy, which incorporated France 24, Radio France International and TV5 Monde. The director-general at that time was Christine Ockrent.

On 12 July 2012, he resigned from the post of President of France Médias Monde.
