= François Picard =

François Picard may refer to:

- François Picard (racing driver) (1921–1996), French racing driver
- François Picard (naturalist) (1879–1939), French naturalist
- François Picard (journalist), Franco-American journalist
