= Saikali =

Lebanese surname

Saikali or Saykali is a Lebanese surname. Notable people with the surname include:

- Fadi Saikali (born 1969), Lebanese judoka
- Marc Saikali (born 1965), French–Lebanese journalist
- Michel Saykali (1932–2015), Lebanese fencer
- Nadia Saikali (born 1936), Lebanese abstract expressionist painter
