= Georja Calvin-Smith =

British Paris-based journalist and presenter

Georja Calvin-Smith (often misspelled Georgia Calvin-Smith) is a British Paris-based international television news presenter, producer, writer, and journalist who hosts and moderates various forums globally. Calvin-Smith is best known for her role at France 24 as a news anchor and presenter of the daily series Eye on Africa and the weekly television news magazine Across Africa.

== Early life and education ==
Calvin-Smith was born in Trinidad and emigrated to England when she was seven years old. Calvin-Smith studied law in the United Kingdom, and was subsequently invited to join the diplomatic service of Trinidad and Tobago but turned to journalism instead. She became a naturalised British citizen in 2010.

== Career ==
=== Media career ===
Since 2007, Calvin-Smith has worked as a journalist in the United States, Britain and France, on news, current affairs, and international documentaries. Early in her career, she worked as a news reporter and presenter in Manchester, England on TV station Channel M (circa 2010), and produced stories, features and documentaries for the BBC, ITV Network, and HBO in New York City.

In recent years, Calvin-Smith has worked in various reporting, producing and presenter roles for France 24. After years of presenting news bulletins, she became the presenter for The Week in the Maghreb, which covered developments in north-central and northwest Africa. Eventually moving to cover the entire continent, she currently produces and presents the network's daily Eye on Africa bulletin, and anchors its weekly Across Africa TV-magazine show.

Calvin-Smith has reported from around the world, and interviewed many heads of state including the presidents of Nigeria, Mali, Ivory Coast, Namibia, Angola, Ghana and Zambia.

=== Event leadership ===
Calvin-Smith has hosted numerous high-level debates and dialogues at international summits, organisation forums, and corporate events, particularly throughout Africa, including events of the United Nations, the OECD, the World Bank, and several African-based international organisations.

As chair of the OECD's Africa Forum in Paris, Calvin-Smith oversaw a panel of ministers and presidents discussing Africa's economic challenges. She has also moderated other OECD panels. In 2018, she conducted conversations with policy makers about Africa’s economy at the World Export Development Forum in Zambia. In 2019, at the initial Luanda Biennale and pan African Forum for the culture of Peace, she chaired a presidential panel.

Calvin-Smith routinely leads events for the African Development Bank. In the past, she has moderated televised debates for the African Development Bank in Ahmedabad, India and Busan, South Korea.

Calvin-Smith served as Master of Ceremonies at the Invest in African Energy Forum in Paris for the African Energy Chamber (AEC). and at the 2021 Global SME Finance Forum. She also led a panel for the Africa CEO Forum.

At the 2015 United Nations Climate Change Conference (COP 21) held in Paris, Calvin-Smith guided keynote sessions with California governor Jerry Brown, Paris Mayor Anne Hidalgo, former New York City Mayor Michael Bloomberg, and other leaders. She led discussions at the UN’s World Press Freedom Day event in Jakarta, Indonesia.

May 20, 2025, Calvin-Smith was master of ceremonies at the 150th Anniversary World Metrology Day commemoration, sponsored by the International Bureau of Weights and Measures (BIPM), at UNESCO World Headquarters in Paris.\

The following June, at the 2025 Ibrahim Governance Weekend in Morocco, she was moderator of the MIF Leadership Ceremony with Morocco's president and current or former leaders, or key dignitaries, of the United Nations, European Union, Germany, and the World Health Organization.

== Recognition ==
Calvin-Smith has been featured in Le Monde's "Women in Africa" conference, along with Nobel Peace Prize laureate Leymah Gbowee and the International Criminal Court's chief prosecutor, Fatou Bensouda.

In 2020, Calvin-Smith was a judge for the annual Rory Peck Awards which recognize "the most outstanding work of freelance journalists and filmmakers" in international media.

In 2025. in London, at the G-SEL Conference 2025, of the Global Sustainable Education & Leadership (G-SEL) Network (where she headed many events), in a ceremony in the House of Lords, Calvin-Smith was awarded their 2025 Voice for Equity Award.

Calvin-Smith is recognized as an Honorary Patron of the Heritage and Cultural Society of America (HACSA)
