= Monte Carlo Doualiya =

- France
- Broadcast area: FM: Bahrain, Oman, Djibouti, Iraq, Jordan, Kuwait, Lebanon, Libya, Mauritania, Qatar, Palestinian territories, Sudan, South Sudan; Satellite: Hot Bird, Badr-4, Nilesat 201

Programming
- Language: Arabic (mainly)
- Format: Talk, News, Sport
- Affiliations: Radio France Internationale

Ownership
- Owner: France Médias Monde

History
- First air date: 1972; 54 years ago
- Former names: RMC Moyen-Orient (1972–2007)

Links
- Website: www.mc-doualiya.com

Monte Carlo Doualiya (Arabic: مونت كارلو الدولية), formerly RMC Moyen-Orient (English: Radio Monte Carlo Middle East), is a French public radio service that broadcasts news, talk shows, and sports content across the Arab world. It was established in 1972 and operated as a subsidiary of France Médias Monde, a state-owned holding company.

Headquartered in Paris, the station produces Arabic-language content and broadcasts to audiences across the Middle East and the Maghreb 24 hours a day. Its distribution network includes local FM transmitters, shortwave radio, satellite platforms, and its official website.

== History ==
=== 1968–1972: The SOFIRAD project ===
In the late 1960s, the French government sought to establish an international pan-Arab radio station to compete with broadcasters from the United Kingdom, the United States, and the USSR. The Société Financière de Radiodiffusion (SOFIRAD), which managed state holdings in broadcast media, selected the Radio Monte-Carlo project due to its reputation in the Mediterranean and OFIRAD's 84% stake in the broadcaster.

Following an agreement with Prince Rainier III of Monaco in June 1968, negotiations began with Nicosia Radio to install a broadcasting antenna at Cape Greco, Cyprus. In February 1969, SOFIRAD and the French Broadcasting and Television Office formed the Monegasque Society for Broadcasting Studies to plan and implement the project. One year later, this entity was replaced by the Monegasque Society for Exploitation and Broadcasting Studies (SOMERA) to oversee the completion of the initiative.

=== 1972–2006: RMC Middle East ===
Radio Monte-Carlo Middle East (RMC Middle East) began broadcasting in 1972. The radio established itself as a radio service in several Middle Eastern and Persian Gulf nations, including Lebanon, Jordan, and Syria. The entity managing the station [SOMERA], received an annual funding of 28 francs from the Ministry of Foreign Affairs. Over time, the service faced competition from local broadcasters and international radio stations such as the BBC World Service and the Voice of America. This competition was coupled with a chronic deficit and declining advertising revenue, which led to a restructuring in the 1990s.

At the end of 1996, SOFIRAD sold RMC Moyen-Orient to the Radio France Internationale group for the sum of 1 franc. Its audience was estimated at 16 million people at the time. The radio station, which had previously broadcast on medium wave, shortwave, and satellite, began broadcasting on FM in some countries. In 1998, after moving to the Maison de la Radio in Paris, it became the first public radio station to switch to all-digital.

In 2005, RMC Middle East's audience began to decline due to the proliferation of local FM stations in Baghdad, Basra, Mosul, Djibouti, and Kuwait. A new team was appointed in November 2005, with Philippe Beauvillard as general manager and Agnès Levallois as news director. The station's programming was updated in an effort to reach younger listeners.

=== Since 2007: Monte Carlo Doualiya ===
In late 2006 and early 2007, the radio station was rebranded as Monte Carlo Doualiya.

On April 4, 2008, the holding company Audiovisuel extérieur de la France was created under the impetus of French President Nicolas Sarkozy. The aim was to group together the activities of France's external audiovisual sector, namely the television channels TV5 Monde and France 24, and the radio station Radio France Internationale, of which Monte Carlo Doualiya was a subsidiary.

In January 2012, Monte Carlo Doualiya ceased to be a subsidiary of Radio France Internationale when it became a fully-fledged channel of the Audiovisuel extérieur de la France alongside Radio France Internationale and France 24. The legal merger of the group with its channels became effective on February 13, 2012.

In 2013, the radio station launched its own website and adopted a new program schedule. On June 3, Radio France Internationale and Monte Carlo Doualiya launched a temporary bilingual radio station in Marseille called La Méditerranée ensemble. This coincided with Marseille-Provence 2013 and the opening of the Museum of European and Mediterranean Civilisations. The station broadcasts Monte Carlo Doualiya programs in Arabic from noon to 6 p.m., and Radio France Internationale programs in French during the remaining hours.

In 2017, Monte Carlo Doualiya began airing in France for the first time.

=== 2019: Partnership with FAO ===
In 2019, the parent group France Médias Monde (operator of Monte Carlo Doualiya) signed a cooperation agreement with the Food and Agriculture Organization (FAO).

The partnership aimed to produce media content on food security, nutrition, and sustainable agriculture, involving the editorial teams of Monte Carlo Doualiya, Radio France Internationale, and France 24.

=== 2020s: Strong digital growth ===
During the 2020s, the station focused heavily on digital platforms, including its website, podcasts, mobile apps, and social media. This shift changed audience consumption patterns towards digital platforms in Arab world. In 2023, the group reported an increase in digital engagement across its platforms, including YouTube and Instagram.

== Slogans ==
- «Pour le dialogue entre les cultures» (2006–2010)
- «La radio qui va changer la radio» (2010–2013)
- «Sur la même longueur d'onde» (depuis 2013)

== Organization ==
=== Leaders ===
From 1996 to 2012, the Chairman and CEO of Monte Carlo Doualiya was a part of its parent company, Radio France Internationale. In 2012, he was appointed the CEO of its parent company, France Médias Monde (formerly Audiovisuel extérieur de la France).

Chief Executive Officers: Charles-César Solamito: 1972–December 1994; Jean-Noël Tassez: December 1994–end of 1996; CEO of Radio France International: Jean-Paul Cluzel: end of 1996–May 2004; Antoine Schwarz: June 2004–April 2008; Alain de Pouzilhac: April 2008–January 2012; CEO of France Médias Monde: Alain de Pouzilhac: January 2012–July 2012; Marie-Christine Saragosse: since October 2012	Directors: Jacques Taquet: October 1995; Christophe Carbonnier: November 2004; Philippe Beauvillard (interim): November 2004–November 2005; Philippe Beauvillard: November 2005-December 2008; Geneviève Goëtzinger: December 2008–September 2011; Anne-Marie Capomaccio and Nahida Nakad: February 2012–July 2012; Nahida Nakad: July 2012–November 2012; Souad el Tayeb: since November 2012

=== Capital ===
RMC Moyen-Orient and Monte Carlo Doualiya are the trade names used by the Société Monégasque D'exploitation et D'études de Radiodiffusion (SOMERA). From 1972 to 1996, the latter was 90% owned by the Société Financière de Radiodiffusion (SOFIRAD), which managed the French State's interests in radio and television stations. The remainder was owned by the state of Monaco.

From 1996 to 2012, the radio was a subsidiary of the Radio France Internationale group, an independent national programming company, until 2008 when it joined the Audiovisuel Extérieur de la France.

Since 2012, Monte Carlo Doualiya has been a subsidiary of the national programming company France Médias Monde (formerly Audiovisuel Extérieur de la France), 100% owned by the French State via the State Participation Agency (APE).

=== Budget ===
From 1996 to 2012, the radio station was a subsidiary of the Radio France Internationale group, from which it received its budget. Since 2012, it was a subsidiary of France Médias Monde (formerly Audiovisuel extérieur de la France). The latter distributes its budget between its channels: France 24, Radio France Internationale, and Monte Carlo Doualiya.

=== Seat ===
The radio station's headquarters were formerly located in the Palais de la Scala, 1 avenue Henry Dunant in Monaco.

After becoming a subsidiary of Radio France Internationale in 1996, RMC Moyen-Orient relocated to the Maison de la Radio located at 116 avenue du Président-Kennedy in the 16th arrondissement of Paris.

In February 2013, Monte Carlo Doualiya and Radio France Internationale moved to the France 24 in the France Médias Monde building (then known as Audiovisuel extérieur de la France) in Issy-les-Moulineaux, in Hauts-de-Seine.

=== Staff ===
- In 2006, RMC Middle East employed nearly 150 people, including 45 journalists in Paris and 46 correspondents worldwide.
- In 2013, Monte Carlo Doualiya employed 48 permanent journalists based in Paris and relied on a network of 67 correspondents around the world.
- In 2014, the Monte Carlo Doualiya editorial team had 68 full-time equivalents, out of the 1,714 employed by France Médias Monde.
