= Independent Press Council of Myanmar =

- မြန်မာနိုင်ငံ လွတ်လပ်သော သတင်းမီဒီယာကောင်စီ
- Formation: 22 December 2023
- Type: Independent media regulatory body
- Headquarters: Thailand (Operating in exile)
- Region served: Myanmar
- Members: 41 media outlets and 18 freelance journalists
- Chairperson: Nan Paw Gay
- Secretary: Toe Zaw Latt
- Main organ: Executive Committee (14 members)
- Website: ipcmm.org

The Independent Press Council of Myanmar (မြန်မာနိုင်ငံ လွတ်လပ်သော သတင်းမီဒီယာကောင်စီ; abbreviated IPCM) is a self-regulatory body established by Myanmar journalists in exile. It was formed on 22 December 2023 as an independent alternative to the state-linked Myanmar Press Council following the 2021 Myanmar coup d'état. The council represents a coalition of ethnic, regional, and independent media outlets dedicated to upholding professional ethics and protecting journalists under threat.

== Core Functions ==
The IPCM operates with a focus on several key areas to support the Myanmar media landscape:

- Ethical Oversight: To mark World Press Freedom Day in May 2024, the IPCM introduced a standardized Media Code of Conduct for journalists reporting on the Myanmar conflict.
- Advocacy and Protection: The council provides legal assistance and safety resources for journalists facing persecution. It has consistently called for the release of detained media workers and for safe access to information.
- Policy Critique: The body actively monitors and criticizes restrictive legislation, such as the Cybersecurity Law, which it views as a tool to suppress freedom of expression.

== Governance and Membership ==
As of 2026, the IPCM is led by an Executive Committee of 14 members. The current leadership includes:

- Chairperson: Nan Paw Gay (Karen Information Center)
- Secretary: Toe Zaw Latt

Membership is open to independent media organizations and freelance journalists but explicitly excludes state-controlled or political party-affiliated outlets.
