= Amazing Train Journeys =

- Des trains pas comme les autres
- Genre: Documentary
- Created by: François Gall; Bernard d'Abrigeon
- Presented by: Philippe Gougler (from 2011)
- Music by: Stéphanie Blanc; Jérôme Levatois (2nd form)
- Country of origin: France
- Original language: French
- No. of seasons: 10 (1st form); 12 (2nd form)

Production
- Running time: 52 minutes
- Production companies: France 2 (1987–2005); Step by Step Productions (from 2011); France Télévisions (from 2011)

Original release
- Network: France 5
- Release: 12 January 1987 – present

Amazing Train Journeys (original title in French: Des trains pas comme les autres) is a French documentary series created by François Gall and Bernard d'Abrigeon, broadcast since 12 January 1987 on Antenne 2, and after France 2. Some episodes were rebroadcast since 2006 on France 5, that relaunched the series on 4 April with a new format presented by Philippe Gougler.

== History ==
The show, created and produced by François Gall et Bernard d'Abrigeon, was broadcast since 12 January 1987 on Antenne 2, and after on France 2.

In July 2011, the France 5 channel decided to relaunch the program with a new formula: the show was presented by an on-screen journalist, Philippe Gougler, who follows a real railway journey and meets train users.

For Philippe Gougler, also co-author of the documentaries, the goal was to be less "contemplative and heritage" and to give a "human dimension", curious, sensitive and caring, through meetings, "attention given to the other" and the presence of a facilitator on the ground.

== Episodes ==
=== First form (1987–2005) ===
List of the 58 episodes of the first form
Episode	Title	Destination(s)	First released	Channel
1	Le Canada: d'un océan à l'autre	Canada	12 January 1987	Antenne 2
2	L'Inde: quatre milliards de voyageurs	India	19 January 1987	Antenne 2
3	Norvège, Suède: l'Express du soleil de minuit	Norway, Sweden	26 January 1987	Antenne 2
4	Japon: les trains obus	Japan	1 February 1989	Antenne 2
5	Congo-Océan	Republic of the Congo	8 February 1989	Antenne 2
6	Russie: Transsibérien	Russia	14 July 1991	Antenne 2
7	Australie: l'Indian Pacific	Australia	28 July 1991	Antenne 2
8	Thaïlande, Malaisie, Singapour Express	Thailand, Malaysia, Singapore	4 August 1991	Antenne 2
9	Turquie: Trans-Europe-Asie	Turkey	11 August 1991	Antenne 2
10	Égypte: Trains et pharaons	Egypt	18 August 1991	Antenne 2
11	Viêt Nam: du Nord au Sud	Vietnam	25 August 1991	Antenne 2
12	Mexique: des trains et des dieux	Mexico	1 September 1991	Antenne 2
13	États-Unis: de l'Atlantique au Pacifique	United States	8 September 1991	Antenne 2
14	Kenya: Safari Pacifique	Kenya	9 July 1992	Antenne 2
15	Équateur: des Andes aux Galápagos	Ecuador	16 July 1992	Antenne 2
16	Corée du Sud	South Korea	30 July 1992	Antenne 2
17/18	Indonésie: de Java à Bali	Indonesia	26 August 1993	France 2
19/20	Chine du Nord, Chine du Sud	China	2 September 1993	France 2
21/22	Au pays des Incas	Peru, Bolivia	3 August 1995	France 2
23	Maroc	Morocco	24 August 1995	France 2
24/25	Birmanie: Myanmar	Burma	31 August 1995	France 2
26/27	Au sud de l'Inde	India	3 July 1997	France 2
28/29	Sicile	Italy	10 July 1997	France 2
30/31	Italie du Nord : L'Orient-Express, Florence, Venise et la Toscane	Italy	31 July 1997	France 2
31	De l'Éthiopie à Djibouti	Ethiopia	21 August 1997	France 2
32/33	Brésil: Rio de Janeiro	Brazil	28 August 1997	France 2
34/35	L'Afrique du Sud: de Pretoria au Cap, de Johannesburg au Parc Krüger	South Africa	24 June 1999	France 2
36/37	Argentine, Paraguay: des chutes d'Iguazú à la Terre de Feu	Argentina, Paraguay	30 July 2000	France 2
38/39	Syrie, Jordanie: de l'Oasis de Palmyre au désert de Wadi-rum	Syria, Jordan	3 August 2000	France 2
40	Grèce	Greece	13 August 2000	France 2
41	Les trains de luxe en Orient		27 August 2000	France 2
42/43	Baltique express: de Saint-Pétersbourg à Tallinn, de Riga à Varsovie	Russia, Latvia, Lithuania, Poland	22 December 2001	France 2
44/45	France: petits trains, grande passion	France	17 May 2003	France 2
46	Andalousie	Spain	3 August 2003	France 2
47/48	Trains de luxe en Asie: au nord de l’Inde, de Singapour en Thaïlande	India, Singapore, Thailand	10 August 2003	France 2
49	Iran	Iran	1er August 2004	France 2
50/51	Tunisie	Tunisia	20 August 2005	France 2
52	En Europe à toute vapeur	Switzerland, Wales, Belgium, Germany	2 September 2006	France 2
53/54	Portugal	Portugal	7 July 2007	France 2
55/56	Pékin et la route de la soie	China	2 August 2008	France 2
57/58	Écosse: hier et aujourd'hui, les hautes terres	Scotland	30 August 2008	France 2

=== Second form (since 2011) ===
List of episodes of second form
Episode	Destination	First release	Channel
Season 1			France 5
1 (59)	Vietnam	28 July 2011	France 5
2 (60)	Cuba	4 August 2011	France 5
3 (61)	South India	11 August 2011	France 5
4 (62)	Peru	18 August 2011	France 5
5 (63)	North India	25 August 2011	France 5
Season 2			France 5
1 (64)	Thailand	26 July 2012	France 5
2 (65)	Bolivia	2 August 2012	France 5
3 (66)	Turkey	9 August 2012	France 5
4 (67)	Romania	16 August 2012	France 5
5 (68)	Malaysia	23 August 2012	France 5
6 (69)	Argentina	30 August 2012	France 5
Season 3			France 5
1 (70)	Burma	25 July 2013	France 5
2 (71)	South Africa	1 August 2013	France 5
3 (72)	Brazil	8 August 2013	France 5
4 (73)	Philippines	15 August 2013	France 5
5 (74)	United States	22 August 2013	France 5
6 (75)	Madagascar	29 August 2013	France 5
Season 4			France 5
1 (76)	Sri Lanka	24 July 2014	France 5
2 (77)	Morocco	31 July 2014	France 5
3 (78)	Japan	7 August 2014	France 5
4 (79)	Tanzania	14 August 2014	France 5
5 (80)	New Zealand	21 August 2014	France 5
6 (81)	Greece	28 August 2014	France 5
Season 5			France 5
1 (82)	Brazil	30 July 2015	France 5
2 (83)	Norway	6 August 2015	France 5
3 (84)	Australia	13 August 2015	France 5
4 (85)	Hong Kong	20 August 2015	France 5
5 (86)	Scotland	27 August 2015	France 5
Season 6			France 5
1 (87)	Zimbabwe – Zambia	28 July 2016	France 5
2 (88)	South Korea	4 August 2016	France 5
3 (89)	Italy South	11 August 2016	France 5
4 (90)	Sweden Lapland	18 August 2016	France 5
5 (91)	Mongolia	25 August 2016	France 5
Season 7			France 5
1 (92)	Indonesia	20 July 2017	France 5
2 (93)	Finland	27 July 2017	France 5
3 (94)	Chile	3 August 2017	France 5
4 (95)	Russia 1/2: "From Saint Petersbourg to Moscow"	10 August 2017	France 5
5 (96)	Switzerland (summer)	17 August 2017	France 5
6 (97)	Italy North, from Genoa to Venice	24 August 2017	France 5
7 (98)	Russia 2/2: "De Moscow to Lake Baikal"	31 August 2017	France 5
Season 8			France 5
1 (99)	Namibia	19 July 2018	France 5
2 (100)	Colombia	26 July 2018	France 5
3 (101)	Canada	2 August 2018	France 5
4 (102)	Spain	9 August 2018	France 5
5 (103)	Ireland	16 August 2018	France 5
6 (104)	Taiwan	23 August 2018	France 5
7 (105)	Portugal	30 August 2018	France 5
Season 9			France 5
1 (106)	Switzerland (winter)	18 July 2019	France 5
2 (107)	Ecuador	25 July 2019	France 5
3 (108)	Cambodia	1 August 2019	France 5
4 (109)	Albania	8 August 2019	France 5
5 (110)	Tunisia	15 August 2019	France 5
6 (111)	England	22 August 2019	France 5
7 (112)	Costa Rica	29 August 2019	France 5
Season 10			France 5
1 (113)	Ethiopia	16 July 2020	France 5
2 (114)	Austria	23 July 2020	France 5
3 (115)	Panama	30 July 2020	France 5
4 (116)	Denmark	20 August 2020	France 5
5 (117)	Georgia	27 August 2020	France 5
Season 11			France 5
1 (118)	Mauritania	8 July 2021	France 5
2 (119)	Croatia	15 July 2021	France 5
3 (120)	Colombia	22 July 2021	France 5
4 (121)	Sweden	29 July 2021	France 5
5 (122)	Kenya (first part)	5 August 2021	France 5
6 (123)	Kenya (second part)	5 August 2021	France 5
7 (124)	Uzbekistan	12 August 2021	France 5
8 (125)	Lithuania	19 August 2021	France 5
Season 12			France 5
1 (126)	Guatemala	7 July 2022	France 5
2 (127)	Italy	14 July 2022	France 5
3 (128)	Dominican Republic	21 July 2022	France 5
4 (129)	Siberia	28 July 2022	France 5
5 (130)	Greece	4 August 2022	France 5
6 (131)	Mexico	25 August 2022	France 5
7 (132)	Norway (first part)	1 September 2022	France 5
8 (133)	Norway (second part)	1 September 2022	France 5
Season 13			France 5
1 (134)	India	6 July 2023	France 5
2 (135)	Japan	13 July 2023	France 5
3 (136)	Austria (South)	20 July 2023	France 5
4 (137)	Netherlands	10 August 2023	France 5
5 (138)	Serbia	24 August 2023	France 5
6 (139)	Argentina (North)	31 August 2023	France 5
7 (140)	Argentina (South)	31 August 2023	France 5

=== Special episodes ===
List of special episodes
Title	Duration	First release	Channel
Unusual professions	52 min	6 August 2020	France 5
Rencontres extraordinaires	52 min	13 August 2020	France 5
Spéciale 10 ans	1 h 40 min	30 December 2020	France 5
Le meilleur de la Season 11	52 min	29 December 2021	

=== Critical reception ===
- 7 d'Or 1991: Best documentary

In the summer of 2011, Des trains pas comme les autres finished first in Première in the documentary category.

== See also ==
- Train
- Rail transport
