= France.tv Slash =

French television channel

- Network: France 2; France 4; France 5; TV5Monde
- Launched: 5 February 2018; 8 years ago
- Division of: France.tv
- Country of origin: France
- Owner: France Televisions
- Key people: Antonio Grigolini (editorial director)
- Headquarters: Paris, France
- Format: Youth programming
- Original language: French
- Official website: www.france.tv/slash

France.tv Slash is a French online public service platform that is part of the France Télévisions network.

It is dedicated to youth with television programs for young adults. France.tv Slash is the first French public service channel to be fully digital and available on platforms, and since November 2018 on Snapchat.

The new channel is aimed at an audience between high school and working life and deals with themes such as sexuality, discrimination, body, identity, commitment, consumption and connected life through true life stories and testimonials.

== History ==
Social media icon (2019)

On February 5, 2018, France Televisions announced the creation of a channel that would be fully digital and dedicated to young adults with the launch of the Skam France television series on the platform; it is a series that follows the daily lives of several teenagers. Each season of Skam France is focused on a specific character and a particular theme.

Throughout the week, sequences are published on the platform france.tv to form a complete Skam France episode for each weekend of an average of twenty minutes. Viewers can also follow the characters through their accounts on Instagram. The cumulative audience of Season 3 is known to amount up to 28 million views on the platforms where the show is broadcast.

In November 2018, France.tv Slash arrived on the platform's Discover service with the show Sexy Soucis presented by Diane Saint-Réquier, in which she answers questions about sexuality.

== Programming ==
- La Petite Mort (2017–2019, 10 episodes)
- Les Engagés (known as Woke internationally) (2017–2018, 2 seasons, 20 episodes, ongoing)
- Monsieur Flap (2017–2019, 11 episodes)
- Rap Fighter Cup (2018–2019, ongoing)
- Preview (2018–2019, 8 episodes)
- Croc Love (2018–2019, 10 episodes)
- On n'est plus des pigeons ! (2018–2019)
- Skam France (2017–2023, 12 seasons, 122 episodes)
- Stalk (2020, 10 episodes)
- Amours solitaires (2020)
- Le Syndrome de l'Iceberg (2020)
- Drag Race France (2022–2023, seasons 1-2)

France.tv Slash is available on the streaming platform France.tv.

== See also ==
- France Télévisions
- List of television stations in France

== Bibliography ==
- Stéphanie Guerrin (2019-03-17). "France Télévisions accélère sur la fiction numérique". Le Parisien.
- Anissa Hammadi (2018-02-06). "On a testé France.tv Slash, le nouveau média des jeunes". Le Parisien.
