= France Télévisions =

French national public television broadcaster

Coordinates: 48°50′20″N 2°16′17″E

- Logo used since 2022

- France Télévisions headquarters in 2026
- Type: Société anonyme
- Industry: Public service broadcasting
- Founded: 7 September 1992; 34 years ago (as France Télévision); 1 August 2000; 26 years ago (as France Télévisions SA)
- Headquarters: 7 esplanade Henri de France; Paris, France
- Key people: Delphine Ernotte (Chairwoman)
- Products: Broadcasting; Web portals
- Services: Public television; Public radio; Online; france.tv
- Revenue: ▼€3.087 billion (2018)
- Net income: ▲€−89.3 million (2018)
- Total assets: ▼€444.5 million (2018)
- Owner: Government of France
- Number of employees: 9,050 (2021)
- Subsidiaries: TV channels: France 2; France 3; France 4; France 5; France Info; La 1^{re}; TV5Monde (47%); Arte (45%); TiVi5 Monde (47%); TV5 Monde Style (47%); Internet: France.tv; France Info; France.tv Sport; Géopolis; Culturebox; France.tv éducation; Studio 4; Okoo; France.tv Slash; Lumni; Salto; Audiovisual production: France 2 Cinéma; France 3 Cinéma; France.tv Studio; Advertisement: France Télévisions Publicité; Publishing and distribution: France Télévisions Distribution; Others: Médiamétrie (22.89%)
- Website: Official website www.france.tv

France Télévisions (French pronunciation: [fʁɑ̃s televizjɔ̃]; stylised since 2018 as france·tv) is the French national public television broadcaster. It is a state-owned company formed from the integration of the public television channels France 2 (formerly Antenne 2) and France 3 (formerly France Régions 3), later joined by the legally independent channels France 4 (formerly Festival), France 5 (formerly La Cinquième) and France Info.

France Télévisions is currently funded by the French Treasury and the revenue from commercial advertising. When advertising after 20:00 was abolished on France Télévisions in 2009, the French government initially planned to extend the ban to all daytime advertising. However, this measure was never implemented. In September 2010, Culture Minister Frédéric Mitterrand confirmed a two-year moratorium on the planned removal of daytime advertising, postponing the ban on commercials between 06:00 and 20:00 until at least 2014. As a result, France Télévisions continued to broadcast advertising during daytime hours, and the full abolition of advertising on public television was effectively abandoned.

France Télévisions is a supporter of the Hybrid Broadcast Broadband TV (HbbTV) initiative that is promoting and establishing an open European standard for hybrid set-top boxes for the reception of broadcast TV and broadband multimedia applications with a single user interface, and has selected HbbTV for its interactive news, sports and weather service, and plans to add catch-up TV and social media sharing capability.

== History ==
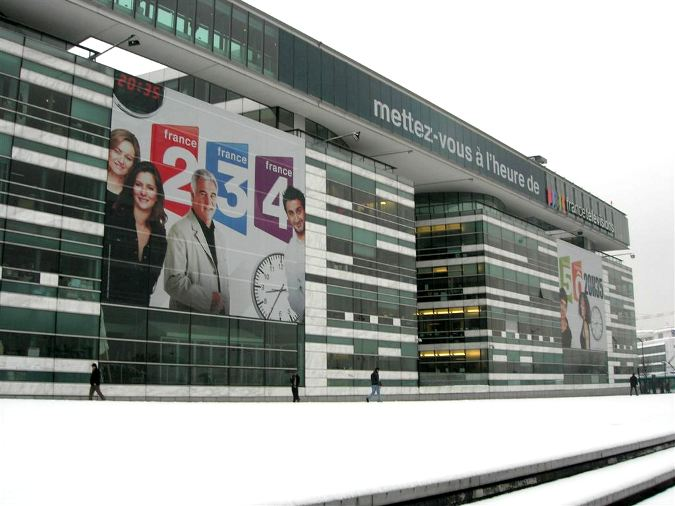
France Télévisions headquarters in Paris (photo taken in 2014)

From 1964 to 1975, French radio and television was monopolised through an organisation known as the Office de Radiodiffusion Télévision Française. In an effort to stimulate competition, the organisation was split in 1975 so that France's three television channels—TF1, Antenne 2, and FR3, would still be owned by the French government, but be operated independently from each other. However, the sale of TF1 to Bouygues in 1987 and increased competition from other new private broadcasters (such as Canal+ and La Cinq, the latter having been replaced by public channel La Cinquième after it ceased transmissions in April 1992) led to a decline in viewership for the two remaining public channels, which lost 30% of their market share between 1987 and 1989. The channels were however saved when a single director-general was appointed to manage both Antenne 2 and FR3, becoming part of a joint entity known as France Télévision. They were renamed in 1992 as France 2 and France 3, respectively.

In August 2000, France Télévisions S.A. was formed as a holding company for France's public television channels, absorbing control of France 2, France 3, and La Cinquième (later renamed France 5). In 2004, Réseau France Outre-mer was absorbed by France Télévisions. Beginning in 2008, the President of France took the duty of naming the presidents for the French public broadcasters; they were previously nominated by the Conseil supérieur de l'audiovisuel. In 2013, under Francois Hollande, the previously adopted law was modified to return the power to nominate the presidents or French public broadcasters to the Conseil supérieur de l'audiovisuel.

Okoo was launched on 9 December 2019 as the new children's television brand of France Télévisions, consisting of a programming block on France 3, France 4 and France 5 and a digital platform on France.tv. This new brand was considered for replacing France 4. Programming and content for teens and young adults would be moved to the new digital offer France.tv Slash.

=== End of France 4 and France Ô ===
France 4 and France Ô were threatened with closure as early as 2018, while President Macron had announced that they would be kept during the 2017 presidential elections. With the arrival of the COVID-19 pandemic and lockdown, France 4 transformed into a giant classroom by offering courses of all levels. Then, seeing this interest from 3–17-year olds, France 4, after the lockdown, transformed into a youth channel, offering cartoons all day long, like Gulli. As a result, it was decided to keep it, while France Ô closed down in August 2020. A few months later, its former EPG position, channel 19, was taken over by Culturebox, a channel focused on entertainment financed by France Télévisions, which would eventually go on channel 14, as an evening programming block on France 4. On 6 June 2025, France 4 took over Canal+'s EPG position, channel 4, while the Culturebox name was removed, but some of its programming remain broadcast on France 4.

On 1 January 2022, France’s audiovisual regulator changed institutional form when the Conseil supérieur de l’audiovisuel (CSA) and the Haute Autorité pour la diffusion des œuvres et la protection des droits sur Internet (Hadopi) were merged into a single authority: the Autorité de régulation de la communication audiovisuelle et numérique (ARCOM).

ARCOM retained the CSA’s powers regarding the governance of French public service media. In particular, Article 47-4 of the Law of 30 September 1986 provides that ARCOM appoints (for fixed terms) the presidents of France Télévisions, Radio France and the company responsible for France’s external public broadcasting (France Médias Monde).

== Services ==
=== National ===
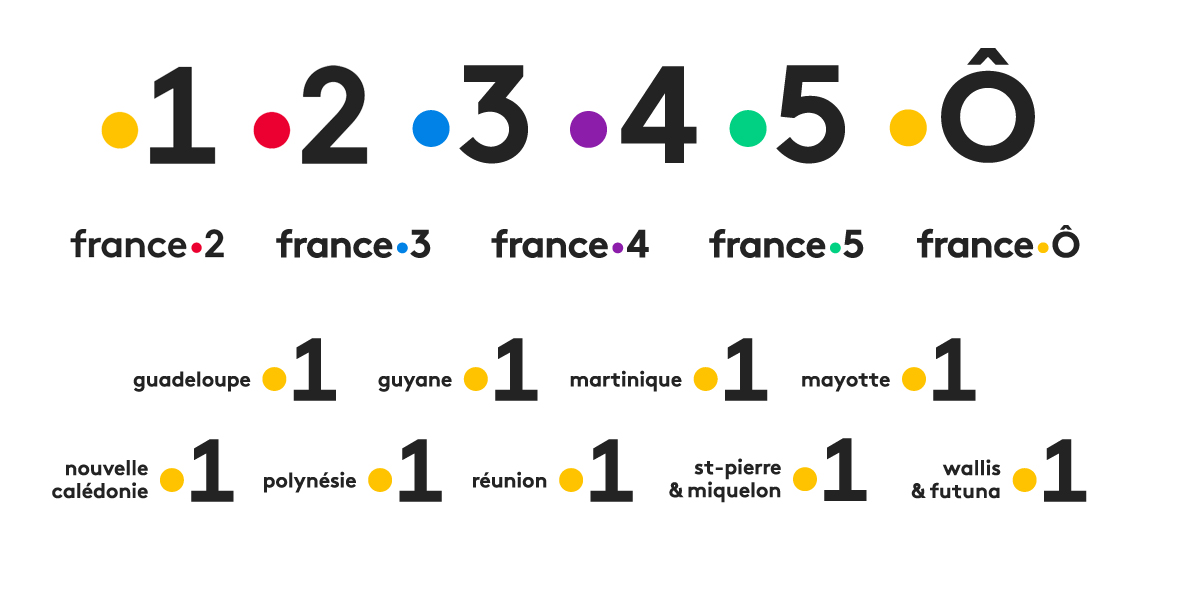
Logos for the television channels (2018–2020)

- France 2 – The company's flagship channel with the second largest viewing audience.
- France 3 – The company's secondary channel, consisting of a network of regional stations.
- France 4 – Previously named "Festival" (1996–2005), and specialising in theatre, opera and French-language and other European originated drama, it is now a channel containing children's programmes, sports, arts, music and theatre split into two programming blocks; these are:
  - An unnamed cultural block (21:00–5:00) — Dedicated to cultural programming. It replaced the former Culturebox on 6 June 2025 when France 4's DTT placement changed from the 14th to the 4th network.
- France 5 – Previously named "La Cinquième" (1994–2002), it focuses on societal issues (health, education, politics etc.) with talk-shows and culture with documentary films.
- France Info – Non-stop news channel, with support from Radio France, France Médias Monde and Institut national de l'audiovisuel. It simulcasts France 24 at night.
- La Première – A network of radio and television stations operating in French overseas departments and territories around the world (formerly known as RFO – Réseau France Outre-mer, Outre-mer 1ère).

=== Thematic ===
France Télévisions took an interest in a number of thematic cable/satellite channels in France:

Channel	France Télévisions	Indirect interest	Other interest
Planète+ Crime	34%		66% Canal+ Thématiques (Canal+ Group)

The channel Planète+ Crime was recently sold.

France Télévisions holds 100% of France Télémusique SAS.

The thematic channel Planète Juniors (formerly Ma Planète) ceased operations in March 2009, and Planète+ Thalassa closed on 31 December 2015.

=== France.tv ===
France.tv is France Télévisions' streaming platform. Launched in 2010 as the catch-up service Pluzz, it offers live feeds of the France Télévisions channels, as well as on-demand streaming of their programmes, and acquired programmes from other broadcasters (such as a 2019 agreement with Canadian broadcaster Ici Radio-Canada Télé). The service was relaunched in 2017 under the France.tv branding, as part of an effort to promote it as the main digital platform of France Télévisions.

In July 2025, France Télévisions announced a partnership with Amazon Prime Video, under which France.tv's on-demand library and live streaming of all France Télévisions channels would become available on the Prime Video platform. The agreement, which took effect immediately, came shortly after commercial rival TF1 Group announced a similar partnership with Netflix to begin in 2026.

=== International ===
Channel	France Télévisions	Indirect interest		Other interest
TV5Monde	46.42%	3.12%	Arte France	France Médias Monde 11.97% RTS 10.53% RTBF 10.53% CBC 6.32% TVMonaco 5.26% Télé-Québec 4.21% INA 1.65%
Arte		50.00%	Arte France	50% Arte Deutschland TV GmbH (ARD and ZDF)

France Télévisions holds 45% of the Arte France holding company together with the French state (25%), Radio France (15%) and INA (15%). Arte France and Arte Deutschland form the Arte Consortium that manages the bilingual French-German channel (Arte shared its analogue channel with France 5, but both channels have separate full-time services on cable, satellite and digital broadcasts).

France Télévisions also controls the new R1 digital multiplex that currently hosts France 2, France 3, France 5, Arte and La Chaîne parlementaire. France 4 was originally on the R1 multiplex but was moved to R2 to allow space for regional channels on R1.

== Subsidiaries ==
- France.tv Publicité – Advertising department of the group.
- France.tv Distribution – Edition and commercial distribution of the programmes of the group's channels on DVD, Blu-ray and VOD.
- France.tv Studio – Production company composed of three labels:
  - France.tv Access – Responsible for subtitling for deaf and hard of hearing of all the programmes of the channels of the group (quality charter recognised by AFNOR).
  - France Doublage – Responsible for dubbing, audio description and subtitling of multilingual programmes.
  - Histodio – Creation of sound works.
- France 2 Cinéma and France 3 Cinéma – Films production and support for French cinema.

== Slogans ==
- 7 September 1992 to May 2001: « Ça fait du bien quand ça s'allume », « Aucune hésitation, c'est France Télévision » / In English : "It does you good when it lights up", "No hesitation, it's France Television"
- May 2001 to September 2006: « Donnons de l’imagination à nos images » / In English : "Let's give imagination to our images"
- September 2006 to August 2008: « Vous avez tous les choix » / In English: "You have all the choices"
- August 2008 to September 2011: « Le choix de la différence » / In English: "The choice of difference"
- September 2011 to September 2012: « Créer pour partager » / In English: "Create to share"
- September 2012 to 2018: « Bien différents, bien ensemble » / In English: "Very different, well together"
- Since 2018: « Plus rien ne se fera sans vous » / In English: "Nothing more will happen without you"

== Logo gallery ==
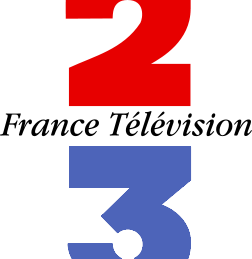
France Télévision's first logo from 1992 to 2000

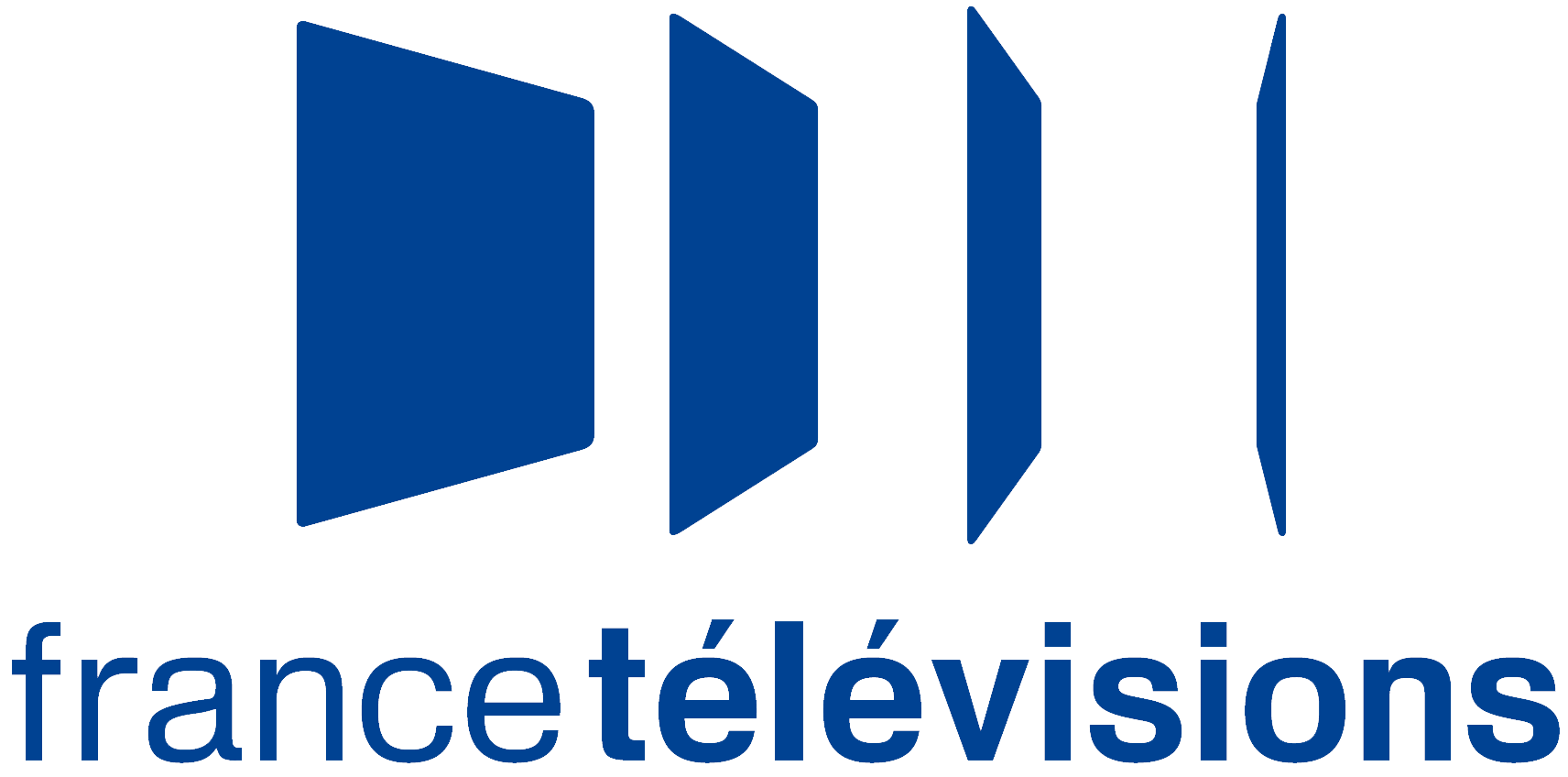
France Télévisions' third logo from 2002 to 2008

France Télévisions' fourth logo from 2008 to 2011

France Télévisions' sixth logo from 2012 to 2018

France TV's seventh logo from 2018

== See also ==
- Radio France
- Television in France
