= InfoMigrants =

European news website

- Website type: News website
- Available in: Arabic, English, French
- Country of origin: France, Germany, Italy
- Area served: International
- Owners: Deutsche Welle, France Médias Monde, ANSA
- Services: News and information for migrants and refugees
- Website: www.infomigrants.net
- Launched: 2017
- funded by European Union

InfoMigrants is a news service established to provide a reliable source of verified news for, and about, migrants and refugees.

It was set up in 2017 by a tri-national consortium of media bodies, from France, Germany and Italy.

With the help of finance from the EU, InfoMigrants arises through a joint undertaking between Deutsche Welle, France Médias Monde and the Italian news agency ANSA.

It provides information in a minimum of three languages, Arabic , English and French, intended to provide an understanding of Europe from the perspective of an outsider with a prospective interest in immigrating, and an ongoing news flow of information regarding immigration - related activity.

== Mission ==
InfoMigrants describes its mission as:

'To supply migrants with reliable, verified, objective and balanced news and information about the countries they have left, the countries they travel through, and the countries to which they are headed.'

== Monitoring ==
The work of InfoMigrants is monitored by researchers at the UK's Open University.
