= Ghislaine Dupont =

French journalist (1956–2013)

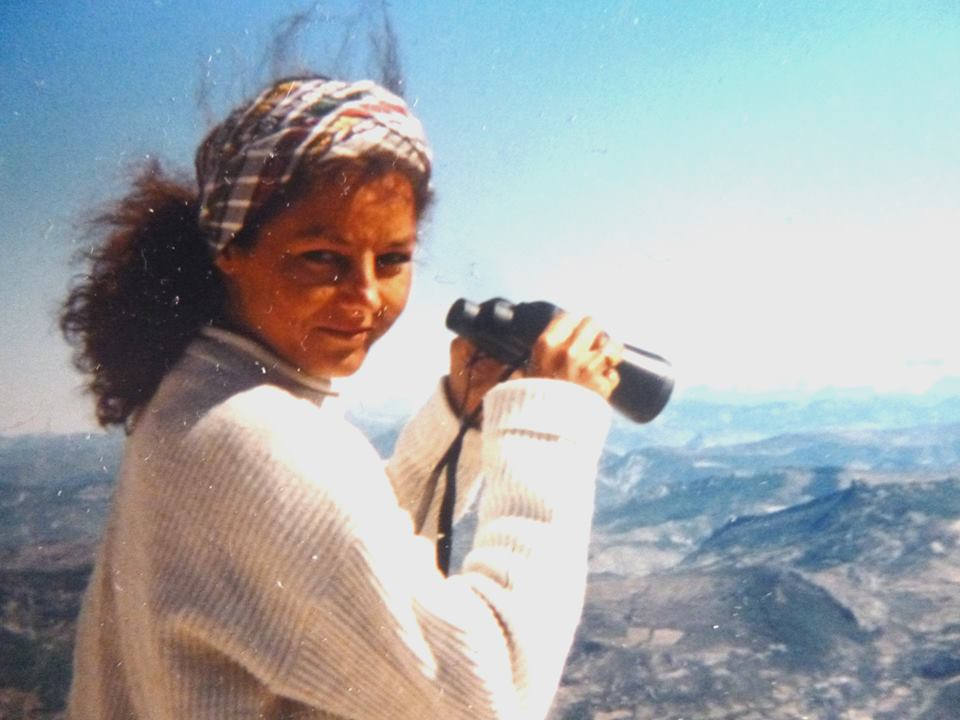
- Born: 13 January 1956
- Died: 2 November 2013 (aged 57); Mali
- Presenting career
- Station: Radio France Internationale
- Country: France

Ghislaine Dupont (French: [ʒislɛn dypɔ̃]; 13 January 1956 – 2 November 2013) was a French journalist who specialised in African issues.

== Personal history ==
She lived as a child some years in Africa. After college, she enrolled in the École supérieure de journalisme de Paris.

== Career ==
She began her career by writing in Ouest-France and Témoignage Chrétien. She worked afterwards with free radio stations, including Gilda La Radiopolitaine in Paris. She joined Radio France Belfort then for the first time Radio France Internationale in 1986, before going to Morocco in Tangier for private Radio Méditerranée Internationale. After her final return to RFI in 1990, Dupont worked only about African issues: with UNITA in Angola, in Sierra Leone in the territories handed by the RUF, Djibouti, Ethiopia-Eritrea conflict, Rwanda, Sudan, Algeria and Ivory Coast where she revealed the existence of mass graves in Abidjan. She was active in the Democratic Republic of Congo between 1997 and 2007. Ghislaine Dupont was known as a first class investigator, having editorial rigor and finesse and a very good political analysis. She became in July 2013 editorial advisor at RFI.

=== Democratic Republic of Congo ===
Ghislaine Dupont began her involvement in the Democratic Republic of Congo (DRC) in 1997. In 2002, she was involved in the creation of Radio Okapi in the DRC. "The Frequency of Peace" was created at the initiative of the Swiss Hirondelle Foundation, an NGO active in supporting the media in crisis situations, with the support of the UN Mission in the DRC (MONUC). She trained young journalists and Radio Okapi is now at the forefront of the news media of the country.

In 2006, she was expelled by the Kinshasa government of Kabila between the first and second round of the presidential election.

== Death and legacy ==
Dupont was killed on 2 November 2013, not far from Kidal in northeastern Mali after being abducted by unidentified assailants. She was with the technician Claude Verlon, who was killed with her.

On 5 November 2013, Dupont and Verlon received posthumous decorations from Ibrahim Boubacar Keita, the president of Mali.

In September 2014, Radio France Internationale announced the Ghislaine Dupont et Claude Verlon scholarships to honor its deceased journalists. The annual award is presented to a journalist under 30 and a technician from Africa, and they will have the opportunity to study in Paris. The award was first presented on 2 November 2014 in Bamako, which is the first anniversary of their death.

In 2015, the United Nations assigned the date of commemoration for the International Day to End Impunity based on the outrage behind the murder of Dupont and Verlon as stated in its official resolution.
