= Claude Verlon =

French journalist murdered on 2 November 2013

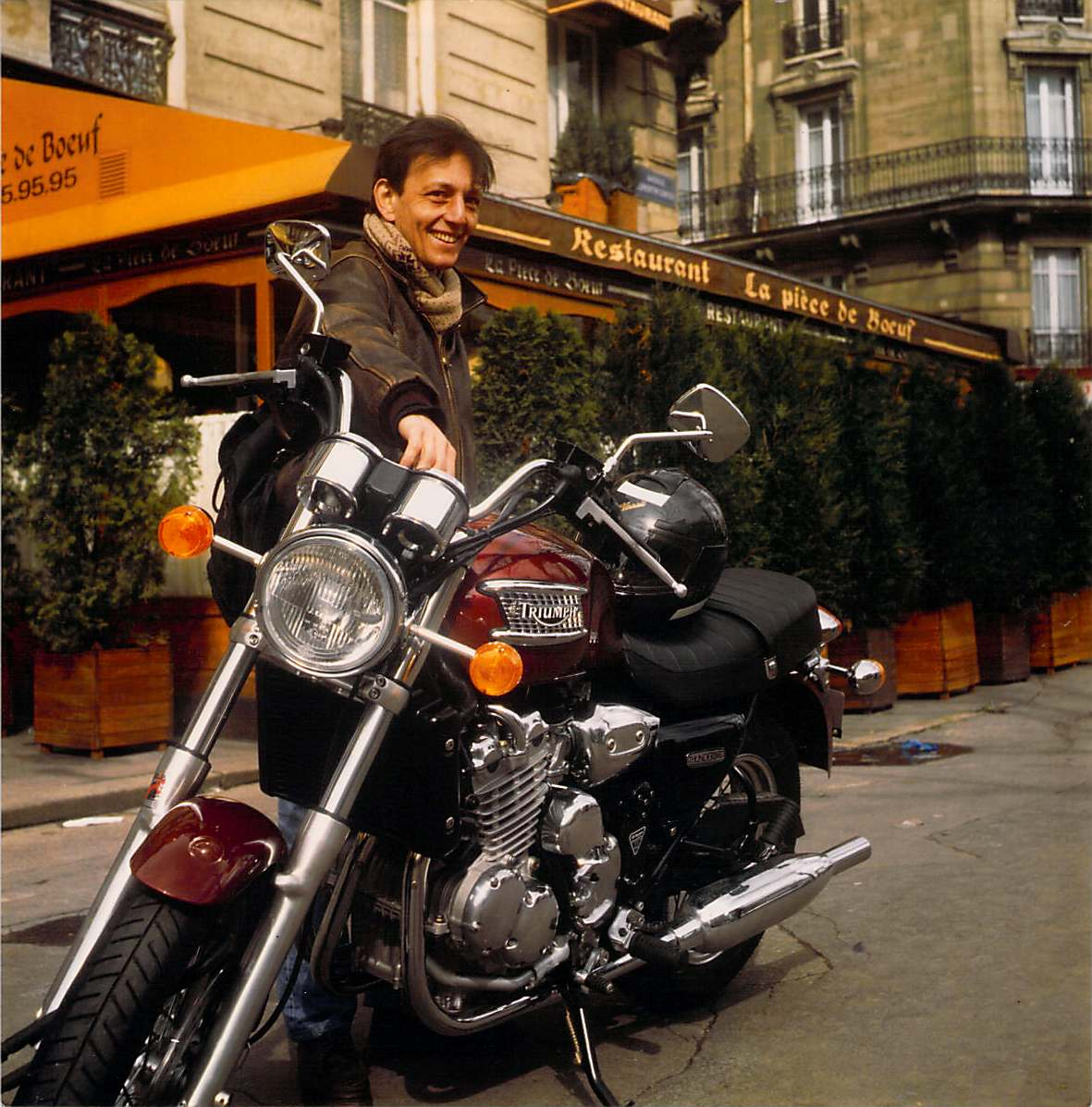
- Born: 6 July 1958; Aubervilliers, Seine-Saint-Denis, France
- Died: 2 November 2013 (aged 55); Kidal, Mali
- Cause of death: shot
- Occupations: Field reporter, sound engineer
- Years active: Over 30 years
- Organization: Radio France Internationale

Claude Verlon (6 July 1958 – 2 November 2013), a 30-year veteran French journalist and sound engineer with Radio France Internationale, was killed along with his colleague Ghislaine Dupont in Kidal, Mali while reporting.

== Personal information ==
Claude Verlon was born in Aubervilliers, Seine Saint Denis, France. He enrolled at the Ecole Nationale Supérieure Louis-Lumière and took night courses while he was working from 1984 until he graduated in 1986.

== Career ==
Claude Verlon was sound engineer at Radio France Internationale from 1982 until his murder in 2013. In 1984, he made his first reports as a field reporter. He contributed to the creation of the first reporting service at RFI. At the time of his death, Verlon was a deputy director of technical services at RFI.

Verlon was passionate about Africa, and he had made other missions to this continent while at RFI. In 2005, Bamako, he created a radio studio outside the 23rd summit Africa-France to cover the event. He specialized in technical challenges, and he made reports from many international locations, such as Kosovo, Afghanistan, Iraq, Libya and Mali. As a technician, he established a reputation for his ability to broadcast from the remotest parts of the world. In Bucharest, Romania, he also succeeded in organizing a studio for the Francophone countries summit in 2006 under technically difficult circumstances.

== Assassination ==
Kidal is in Mali shown here relative to the capital Bamako.

Ghislaine Dupont and colleague Verlon were reporting around Kidal, Mali, when they both were murdered. They had just finished an interview with Ambery Ag Rissa, a spokesperson for the National Movement for the Liberation of Azawad, or Tuareg separatists, in the troublesome northeastern town, when four armed men from a political group took them. The two journalists' bodies were found riddled with bullets 12 km from Kidal. None of the suspects have been arrested. The primary suspect is Baye Ag Bakabo, a Tuareg closely related to National Movement for the Liberation of Azawad and Al-Qaeda, because his car was used for Verlon and Dupont's kidnapping, but his whereabouts are unknown. There are still unanswered questions surrounding the circumstances of their death. Al-Qaeda claimed responsibility for the murder.

== Context ==
Verlon and Dupont were in Mali to cover the Malian presidential elections in 2013. It was the second assignment in Kidal for Verlon since he reported on the first round of Mali's presidential election in July 2013.

== Reactions ==
On 5 November, they received a posthumous decoration from Ibrahim Boubacar Keita, president of Mali, in the presence of government officials, RFI representatives, and France's ambassador to Mali.

The United Nations assigned the date of commemoration for the International Day to End Impunity based on the outrage behind the murder of Dupont and Verlon, who were killed on 2 November, as stated in its official resolution.

The Ghislaine Dupont and Claude Verlon Scholarship in September 2014, Radio France Internationale announced the Ghislaine Dupont et Claude Verlon scholarships to honor its deceased journalists. The annual award will be presented to a journalist under 30 and a technician from Africa, and they will have the opportunity to study in Paris. The award was first presented on 2 November 2014 in Bamako, which is the first anniversary of their death.
