= France Info (TV channel) =

French TV news channel launched on September 1, 2016

franceinfo
- Logo used since 2016
- Country: France
- Broadcast area: Metropolitan France and Worldwide
- Headquarters: Paris, France

Programming
- Language: French
- Picture format: 576i (SDTV); 1080i (HDTV)

Ownership
- Owner: France Télévisions; Radio France; France Médias Monde; Institut national de l'audiovisuel
- Sister channels: France 2 France 3 France 4 France 5 La 1ere France 24; TV5Monde

History
- Launched: 1 September 2016; 10 years ago

Links
- Website: www.franceinfo.fr

Availability

Terrestrial
- TNT: Channel 16 (HD)

France Info (pronounced [fʁɑ̃s ɛ̃.fo]; stylized as franceinfo:) is a French domestic rolling news channel which started broadcasting on 31 August 2016 at 6:00 p.m. on the Web. TV broadcasting began on 1 September 2016 at 8:00 p.m. on most TV operators, and on the TNT (digital terrestrial television). As for TNT Sat and Canal+, it began on 6 September.

France Info involves France Télévisions, Radio France, France Médias Monde (FMM, with owns the France 24 channel) and the Institut national de l'audiovisuel (INA). It shares its name with a global news service which gathers the TV channel itself, the radio channel France Info and the website www.francetvinfo.fr. France Info broadcasts from 06:00 seven days a week until 00:00 and simulcasts France 24 overnight. France Info can be watched live on YouTube (with a 12-hour rewind availability) and web.

== Background ==
After LCI, CNews and BFM TV (available on free national DTT), and France 24 (worldwide and in Île-de-France only), France Info is the fifth rolling news channel in France.

The goal of France Info is to distance itself from the competition by focusing heavily on straight news coverage, hoping to offer a higher-quality news service. The channel's music was produced by French composer, Jean-Michel Jarre.

France Info is supported by France Télévisions, in particular France 2 and 3. The channel has 204 employees (176 at France Télévisions, 28 at Radio France), as well as 3,000 journalists distributed among the editorial teams of France 2, France 3 Régions, Réseau Outre-Mer première, Franceinfo, France Inter and France 24. Its total budget is 15 million euros for France Télévisions and 3.5 million euros for Radio France.

It includes the characteristic elements of rolling news channels (live bulletins, distinctive daypart-separated blocks) and debate and analysis programs. The sister radio station provides headline reminders three times each hour at :20, :40 and :50 past (four times an hour at :10, :20, :40 and :50 past between September 2016 and mid-January 2017), France 24 fills in the overnight programming (that would otherwise be filled in by continuous repeats of the day's last live newscast), and Ina offers magazines on "the news seen through a historical eye".

France Info is a global public-service news offering that brings together radio and television and makes use of the experience of the public service as a whole in terms of information.

This is the first major collaboration between public radio and television since 1975; at that time France Inter supplied the footage in the bulletins of the 3^{e} chaîne couleur de l'ORTF (now France 3).

== Programs ==
Unlike other news channels, France Info can be watched without sound, thanks to some reports being text-heavy. Journalists can explain the stories using an interactive touchscreen. The cameraman moves along with the journalists, with a mobile device accompanied. The tone is mostly offbeat, without forgetting to be serious if required. The presentation - done in a studio integrated directly into the newsroom by an anchorman and/or anchorwoman, serving as both news anchors and segment introducers - as well as the interactivity with the "Le Live" thread seen on the channel's website, are other distinctive differences.

- France 24 - world news in simulcast with France 24
- franceinfo: et tout est plus clair - flagship banner for weekday afternoon and weekend rolling news block
- la matinale - breakfast rolling news block with Jean Baptiste Marteau and Zohra Ben Miloud (Monday-Thursday), Djamel Mazi and Brigitte Boucher (Friday-Sunday)
- l'info chez vous - morning rolling news block with Louis Laforge and Marianne Théoleyre
- 12/13 Info - lunchtime rolling news block with Emilie Tran Nguyen
- au coeur de l'info- afternoon rolling news block with Sophie Le Saint
- 17h:info - grand boulletin with Djamel Mazi
- 19/20 Info - evening rolling news block with Lucie Chaumette
- Planète Info - night rolling news block with Alexandra Uzan
- Le 23h - final bulletin prior to overnight France 24 simulcast, introduced to help replace Soir 3 which previously aired on France 3 with Patricia Loison (Monday-Friday) and Sorya Khaldoun (Saturday and Sunday/Friday(Replacement))
- Le journal - hourly live news bulletins, last 12 minutes
- l'essentiel de l'info - bottom-of-the-hour headlines between 6:50am and 10:30pm

=== From Maison de la Radio ===
- 8.30 franceinfo - Political interview with various guest by Marc Fauvelle and Sahlia Brakhlia (Weekdays), Ersin Leibowitch (Saturday and Sunday)
- Les informés du matin - Morning news debates with Marc Fauvelle and Renaud Dély at 9am
- L'invité éco - Economic Interview with Jean Leymarie
- Les informés de Franceinfo - Nightly news debates with Jean-François Achilli (Weekdays), and Olivier de Lagarde (Weekends) at 8pm.
- Questions politiques - Sunday political interview, simulcast with France Inter

== Presenters ==
=== Studio Gilles Jacquier (from France Télévisions) ===
==== Main presenters ====
- Samuel Étienne (6:30–8:30)
- Louis Laforge (10:30–12:00)
- Émilie Tran Nguyen (12:00–14:00)
- Sophie Le Saint (14:00–16:30)
- Julien Benedetto (14:00-16:00)
- Djamel Mazi (6:30-9:00)
- Lucie Chaumette (19:00–20:50)
- Alexandra Uzan (21:00–22:45)
- Patricia Loison (23:00–00:00)
- Myriam Bounafaa (weekends 6:30–10:00)
- Yann Haefele (weekends 06:30-9:00)

==== Newsreaders ====
- Clémence de la Baume (6:00–9:00)
- Camille Grenu (weekends 6:30–10:00)
- Christophe Gascard
- Cassandre Mallay
- Claire Giroud
- Jean-Cristophe Galeazzi
- Martin Baumer (weekends 10:00–13:30)
- Marianne Théoleyre (10:30–13:00)
- Sébastien Thomas
- Murielle Rousselin
- Alizé Lutran]
- David Delós
- N'fanteh Minteh
- Pauline Forgue
- Frédérique Hénaut
- Florent Boutet
- Siegrid Piérard de Misouard
- Flore Maréchal
- Anaïs Hanquet
- Muriel Gensse

=== Studio "L'Info" (from Maison de la Radio) ===
Staff present live headlines every 30 minutes on TV and radio:

- Agathe Mahuet
- Yasmina Adila
- Armël Balôgog
- David Dauba
- Diane Ferchit
- Thomas Benech
- Melanie Delanuay
- Edward Marguier
- Gilles Halais
- Margaux Caroff
- Olivia Chandioux
- Victor Matet
- Stéphane Milhomme
- Emmanuel Langlois
