= François Picard (journalist) =

Franco-American journalist

- Education: Swarthmore College (BA)
- Occupations: Journalist, TV anchor and host
- Employer: France 24
- Known for: TV journalism

François Picard is a Franco-American journalist for the English-language service of the France 24 cable news network. Based in Paris, he hosts the current affairs talk show The France 24 Debate.

== Early life ==
Picard, a dual national of France and the United States, attended the Lycée Français de New York. His first exposure to journalism was as a summer intern at the Paris photo news agency Sipa Press in 1984. Picard graduated with honors from Swarthmore College, in suburban Philadelphia. He also studied for two semesters at the Université de Paris-IV Sorbonne.

== Career ==
=== Early career ===
Picard began his professional career in New York State, working first in Hudson Valley local radio at WKIP in Poughkeepsie. He also worked at WRWD and WAMC. He won multiple awards for local news coverage, including from the New York State National Association of Broadcasters, the Associated Press and the National Association of Broadcasters.

In 1990 Picard returned to France, where he has reported for Radio France International (RFI), Marketplace radio, UPI and Eurosport. His assignments have included the 1994 D-Day commemorations, the building of EuroDisney (now Disneyland Paris) and the launch of Eurostar service between Paris and London. Among the sporting events he has covered include two Olympics Games, the Tour de France and the 1994 Football World Cup.

=== West Africa bureau chief ===
Picard's first African assignments for RFI took him to Mali and to Somalia before he was named as Abidjan staff bureau chief at age 27.

From 1995 to 1998, Picard chronicled Ivory Coast's escalating political tensions for both RFI and the French newspaper Le Monde, as well as civil war in Liberia and Sierra Leone. From Ivory Coast's 1995 boycotted election of Henri Konan Bédié and the arrival of the mercenaries Executive Outcomes in Sierra Leone to the April 1996 street fighting in Liberia's capital of Monrovia and Jerry Rawlings' 1996 re-election in Ghana, Picard has covered the entire region. He has reported several times from Nigeria, including the 1997 funeral in Lagos of the Afrobeat legend Fela Kuti. In 1997, Picard was among the foreign reporters trapped in a hotel surrounded by anti-government rebels in Sierra Leone's capital of Freetown.

=== France 24 ===
After returning to Paris and working for RFI's reporting assignment and business desks, Picard joined Eurosport.

When France 24 was launched on 6 December 2006, Picard was an opening-night news presenter for the network's English-language service. He then covered events such as the 2007 French presidential election, the 2008 financial crisis in Dubai, and in 2010 the Ivory Coast election and that country's subsequent return to civil war.

In 2010, Picard was named host of the flagship current affairs program The France 24 Debate. His panels bring together different perspectives on topics of the day, such as the 2015 Paris Climate Change Summit, Algeria's pro-democracy movement and Europe's migrant crisis. Picard's major interviews have included Nigerian President Muhammadu Buhari, who expressed his desire to negotiate directly with the northern Nigerian terrorist group Boko Haram for the release of 219 Chibok schoolgirls the group had kidnapped. Picard's shows often bring together prominent newsmakers and scholars. He has appeared on radio and TV debates as a guest and a moderator.

Picard launched France 24's Friday journalists' roundtable The World This Week, first in partnership with the International Herald Tribune and, later, The Daily Beast. The American foreign editor Christopher Dickey was a regular panellist for the roundtable until his death in July 2020.
