= Marc Saikali =

French-Lebanese journalist (born 1965)

- Born: 1965 (age 60–61)
- Education: University of Bordeaux
- Title: Director
- Children: 3

Marc Saikali (Arabic: مارك صيقلي; born 1965) is a French-Lebanese journalist. He was the Director of the international news television network France 24 from 2012 to 2021.

== Biography ==
Saikali comes from a Lebanese family. He studied journalism and ethnology studies at the University of Bordeaux.

== Career ==
Saikali started his career in 1988 as a television journalist for France 3 in Normandy, followed by various postings around France. Saikali has held many management positions across the French news media landscape since the early 2000s. From 2003 to 2006, he was the Editor in Chief of France 3's Foreign Desk.

From 2006 to 2008, he led editorial and training at Medi1 Sat. From 2008 to 2010, he was director of France 3's regional activities in Corsica, Via Stella. From 2010 to 2012 he was Director of News at France 3.

From 2012 to 2021, he has been the Director of France 24, based in Paris. He has overseen its global expansion and the launch of a Spanish-language channel.

== Personal life ==
He is fluent in Arabic, French and English. He is married and he has three children.

== See also ==
- Marc Saikali, Director of France 24 on YouTube.
- Marc Saikali on YouTube.
