= Radio France Internationale =

International radio broadcasting service of France

- Type: International public broadcaster
- Country: France

Ownership
- Owner: France Médias Monde (Government of France)

History
- Founded: 1975

Coverage
- Availability: Worldwide
- Affiliates: Monte Carlo Doualiya; France 24; TV5Monde

Links
- Website: rfi.fr/fr; rfi.fr/en

Radio France Internationale, usually referred to as RFI, is the state-owned international radio news network of France. With 59.5 million listeners in 2022, it is one of the most-listened-to international radio stations in the world, along with Deutsche Welle, the BBC World Service and Voice of America.

RFI broadcasts 24 hours per day around the world in French and in 16 other languages in FM, shortwave, medium wave, satellite and on its website. It is a channel of the state company France Médias Monde. The majority of shortwave transmissions are in French and Hausa but also includes some hours of Swahili, Fulfulde and Mandinka. RFI broadcasts to over 150 countries on 5 continents. Africa is the largest part of radio listeners, representing 60% of the total audience in 2010. In the Paris region, RFI comprises between 150,000 and 200,000 listeners. Its digital platforms attract an average of 24.6 million visits a month (2022 average) while 31.1 million followers stay connected via Facebook, Twitter and Instagram and Youtube.

In 2020, the audience was of 58.1 million listeners (up to 11.6 million compared to 2019, +25%), breaking down into 29.8 million in French-speaking Africa, 11 million in non-French speaking Africa, 2 million in the Maghreb region, 1.3 million in Europe, 13 million in the Americas and 1 million in Asia.

== History ==
Logo of RFI from 1996 until June 2013.

RFI was created in 1975 as part of Radio France by the Government of France, and replaced the Poste Colonial (created in 1931), Paris-Mondial (1937), Radio Paris (1939), a private station which was commandeered by the Germans during the occupation of France, and the Voice of France which was operated by the Vichy regime from 1941 to 1944, RTF Radio Paris (1945) and ORTF Radio Paris (1965). In 1986 the French Parliament changed the law to allow RFI to operate independently of Radio France.

RFI operates under the auspices and primary budget of the Ministry for Europe and Foreign Affairs. It broadcasts primarily in French, but also in English, Swahili, Hausa, Spanish, Portuguese, Romanian, Russian, Persian, Chinese, Vietnamese, Cambodian and as of 2015, Manding.

Until 2012, RFI owned Monte Carlo Doualiya (formerly Radio Monte Carlo Middle East), which produces Arabic programmes in Paris, and airs them from a transmitter in Cyprus to audiences across the Middle East and North Africa.

== Incidents ==
On 17 September 2002, Togolese President Gnassingbé Eyadéma tried to stop the broadcasting of an interview with one of his opponents, Agbéyomé Kodjo, by phoning directly to the Elysée Palace. The interview was not censored by Jean-Paul Cluzel, RFI's CEO at the time, due to the coordinated intervention of the journalists' trade unions. However, a report raising questions regarding the French secret services responsibilities in the 1995 death of judge Bernard Borrel in Djibouti, which was broadcast on 17 May 2005, was later removed from RFI's website for undisclosed reasons, possibly due to the intervention of Djiboutian President Ismail Omar Guelleh.

On 21 October 2003, Jean Hélène was reporting for RFI during the civil war in Ivory Coast when he was killed in Abidjan by police sergeant Théodore Séry Dago.

On 2 November 2013, RFI reporting team Ghislaine Dupont and Claude Verlon were murdered while covering the Mali elections. The United Nations set their death date to commemorate the International Day to End Impunity for Crimes Against Journalists each year.

In November 2020, RFI mistakenly published numerous obituaries of famous people on its own web site, as well as sending them to related web sites, after moving draft stories to a new system.

The government of Niger suspended two state-owned media outlets (France 24 and RFI) following the 2023 Nigerien coup d'état.

== Podcasts ==
RFI offers a daily podcast in simple French named Journal en français facile. There are also several other podcasts including the weekly Afrique Presse, which is hosted by Assane Diop and discusses the most important news in Africa that week.

== Slogans ==
- "The world's radio!" (1987 - 1996)
- "And the news become worldwide" (2010 - 2013)
- "Voices of the world" (from 2013)

== See also ==
- France 24
- List of international radio broadcasters

== Bibliography ==
- Thierry Perret (2010). "'L'Afrique à l'écoute': La France, l'Afrique et la radio mondiale". Cahiers d'Études africaines (in French). 50 (198–199–200): 1003–1032. doi:10.4000/etudesafricaines.16448 – via Revues.org.
