= International Day to End Impunity for Crimes Against Journalists =

Annual observance for advocacy of free expression

The International Day to End Impunity for Crimes against Journalists
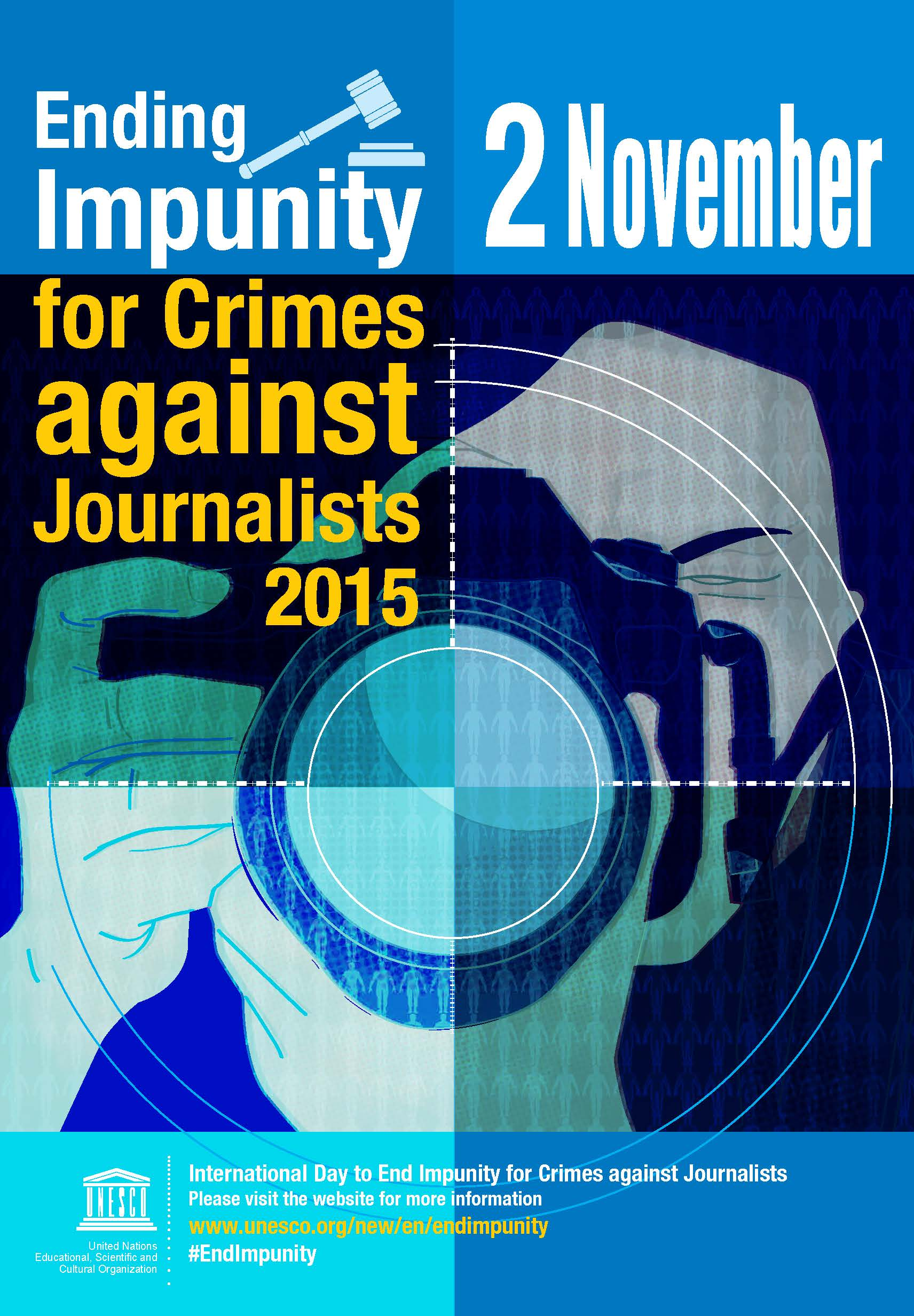
- Observed by: Worldwide
- Date: 2 November
- Next time: 2 November 2025
- Frequency: annual
- Started by: IFEX

The International Day to End Impunity for Crimes against Journalists (IDEI) is a UN-recognized international day observed annually on 2 November.

This day highlights the persistently high level of impunity for crimes committed against journalists worldwide. According to the UNESCO observatory, between 2006 and 2024, more than 1,700 journalists were killed globally, with nearly 90% of these cases remaining unsolved in the courts. As journalists play a critical role in reporting facts to all citizens, impunity for attacks against them has a particularly damaging impact, limiting public awareness and constructive debate.

On 2 November, organizations and individuals worldwide are encouraged to talk about the unresolved cases in their countries, and write to government and intra-governmental officials to demand action and justice. UNESCO organizes an awareness-raising campaign on the findings of the UNESCO Director-General's biennial Report on the Safety of Journalists and the Danger of Impunity, which catalogues the responses of states to UNESCO's formal request for updates on progress in cases of killings of journalists and media workers. UNESCO and civil society groups throughout the world also use 2 November as a launch date for other reports, events and other advocacy initiatives relating to the problem of impunity for crimes against freedom of expression.

== History ==
IFEX, a global network of civil society organizations that defend and promote the right to freedom of expression, declared 23 November as the International Day to End Impunity in 2011. The anniversary was chosen to mark the 2009 Ampatuan massacre (also known as the Maguindanao massacre), in which 57 individuals were murdered, including 32 journalists and media workers. According to the Committee to Protect Journalists, it was single deadliest event for the press since 1992, when it began keeping detailed records on journalist deaths. None of the perpetrators of this crime have been brought to justice.

In December 2013, after substantial lobbying from IFEX members and other civil society defenders of freedom of expression, the 70th plenary meeting of the UN General Assembly passed resolution 68/163, recognizing 2 November as the International Day to End Impunity for Crimes against Journalists (IDEI). The date of the UN day marks the death of Ghislaine Dupont and Claude Verlon, two French journalists killed while reporting in Mali earlier that year.

Since 2013, global commemorations of the IDEI continue to serve as a unique opportunity to sensitize and promote a constructive dialogue among all actors involved in fighting impunity for crimes against journalists and media professionals.

Since 2014, IFEX focuses year-round on building political will for securing justice in cases of impunity.

== See also ==
- Freedom of the press
- Impunity
- World Press Freedom Day
- Safety of journalists
- International Programme for the Development of Communication
- Lists of journalists
- United Nations Special Rapporteur on the promotion and protection of the right to freedom of opinion and expression
