= France 4 =

French television channel formerly known as Festival in 1996

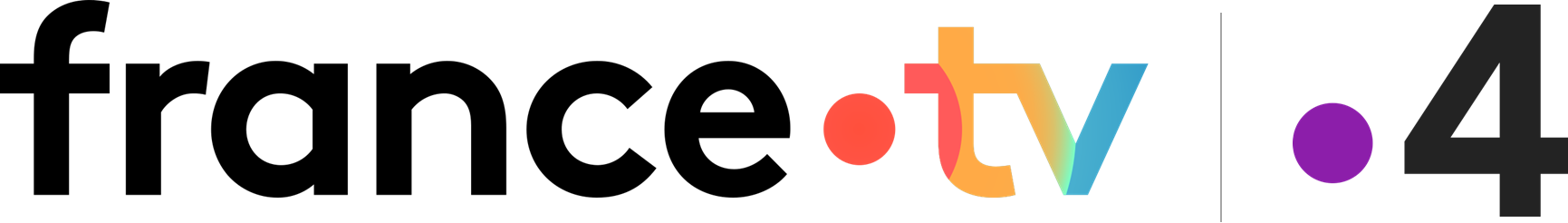
- Logo used subsequently since 6 June 2025
- Country: France
- Broadcast area: France, Andorra, and Monaco, reaching bordering regions via overspill of the French terrestrial network
- Headquarters: Paris, France

Programming
- Language: French
- Picture format: 1080i HDTV (downscaled to 576i for the SDTV feed)

Ownership
- Parent: France Télévisions
- Sister channels: France 2 France 3 France 5 France Info la Première

History
- Launched: 31 March 2005; 21 years ago
- Replaced: Festival (1996–2005)

Links
- Website: www.france.tv/france-4

Availability

Terrestrial
- TNT: Channel 4
- TNT in Overseas France: Channel 4 or 5 or 6

France 4 (pronounced [fʁɑ̃s katʁ]) is a French free-to-air public television channel. Owned by France Télévisions, the channel is divided into two strands, with children's and family programming under the Okoo strand airing around 05:00 to 21:00 daily, and arts programming from 21:00 to 05:00 nightly.

The channel has its origins in Festival, a satellite channel established by France Télévision in 1996 to carry arts and cultural programming. With the launch of France's digital terrestrial television platform TNT on 31 March 2005, Festival was re-launched as a free-to-air channel known as France 4. While it was officially France Télévisions' eighth channel, the "France 4" branding was aligned with its placement on TNT channel 14; it was moved to channel 4 on 6 June 2025.

== History ==
=== Festival (1996–2005) ===
On 24 June 1996, France Télévision established Festival, a satellite channel for the TPS satellite service, which France Télévision co-owned at the time. Festival offered a selection of films and television series, many of them previously seen on France 2, France 3 and Arte.

=== France 4 (2001–present) ===
In 2001, when the French digital terrestrial television system was in its developmental stage, the socialist government of Lionel Jospin asked the president of France Télévisions to consider a bouquet of public channels to be broadcast digitally, so that the public broadcaster could have involvement in this project. France Télévisions proposed the creation of three new channels: "France 1", "France 4" and "France 6", an all-news channel, a channel dedicated to the regions, and a channel featuring repeat broadcasts of France 2 and France 3.

Eventually, France Télévisions would have four digital channels besides France 2 and France 3, with three of them occupying existing channels: France 5 (formerly La Cinquième), Arte, and La Chaîne Parlementaire (a legislative channel); this led to France 5 and Arte being broadcast on two separated channels on digital (as they were already broadcast fully on cable television), after being a combined service on analog. France Télévisions thus only had space for one more new channel. The group eventually proposed that Festival become a free-to-air channel. On 23 October 2002, the Audiovisual Superior Council authorized Festival to begin broadcasting in digital. France Télévisions planned for Festival to be renamed "France 8" (as it would have been the eighth television network in France) or "France Prime", but opted instead for France 4 to fit in between the other channels from the network. The newly created France 4 proposed to present a variety of entertainment, sports, fiction, cinema and series.

In January 2009, Arte sold its 11% share in the channel to France Télévisions for €4.62 million. In July 2009, France 4 began broadcasting in 16:9. On 6 October 2011, France 4 launched its HD feed.

On 19 December 2009, France Télévisions launched Ludo, a new unique children's brand, which merged all former blocks Toowam (France 3), Les Zouzous (France 5, for preschoolers) and KD2A (France 2, the channel ceased to broadcast children shows). Ludo was broadcast on France 3 (focusing on generalist children's shows), France 5 (for preschoolers) and France 4 focused on more teenagers programs like 6teen, live-action shows and action shows, and broadcasts at middays and preevenings. Due to bad ratings, Ludo was removed from France 5 and France 4 on 25 June 2011, making Ludo a France 3 exclusive: on France 5, it became Zouzous, and on France 4, the children's shows became broadcast without a branded block.

France 4 continued to broadcast cartoons only at mornings, and starting September 2013 until midday. These cartoons continued to target a teenager audience, with action shows (Code Lyoko, Wakfu, DC and Marvel cartoons). France 4 also allowed time to more adult shows like Mad and Crash Canyon, and had created Studio 4 (now Studio par France.tv Slash) in 2012.

=== Reconversion to a hybrid channel (2014) ===
On 31 March 2014, France 4 got a rebrand and started to timeshare most of its daily time with the Ludo and Zouzous blocks for children.

In evenings, it targeted a young adult audience, but in 2016, France 4 was refocused on family.

=== Averted closure, focus on cultural programmes ===
In June 2018, a proposal was issued to shut down France 4 as part of planned reforms of France Télévisions, with programming dispersed to France 3, France 5 and online platforms. The proposal was criticised by France's animation industry.

Okoo was launched on 9 December 2019 as the new children's television brand of France Télévisions, consisting of a programming block on France 3, France 4 and France 5 and a digital platform on France.tv. This new brand was considered for replacing France 4. Programming and content for teens and young adults would be moved to the new digital offer France.tv Slash.

France 4 was originally planned to close on 9 August 2020 with its sister channel France Ô, one day after the initially planned date for the closing ceremony of the 2020 Summer Olympics. However, in July 2020, just days before its planned closure, the French Government announced that the channel would continue to broadcast for another 12 months, whilst also pushing back the closure of France Ô by a month, as a result of the COVID-19 pandemic, which delayed the games to July 2021. France 4 carried school programming during the pandemic, which showed the utility of the channel.

From September 2020, the channel moved from being largely a children's entertainment channel, adding more educational programming for children and parents.

In January 2021, a report entitled "mission flash" was submitted to the National Assembly by two deputies in favor of safeguarding France 4, Béatrice Piron (LREM) and Maxime Minot (LR), who were charged with studying the offer for young people on public service television. This report judges that "a channel dedicated to youth is a valuable asset for public television" and takes up all the arguments of those who support the maintenance of France 4.

From 3 May 2021, France 4 began timesharing with Culturebox, reducing the air time from 5:00 am to 8:15 pm. On the 18th that same month, French president Émmanuel Macron announced that France 4 will continue airing and will not close down in August as planned, explaining that its utility through the pandemic for education and its new timeslot of culture at night were the reasons for its continuation. In August, Culturebox stopped airing as a TV channel whilst remaining a programing block on France 4 and keeping timesharing separate.

On 26 August 2024, Okoo expanded its timeslot until 9pm, with new programming for families on weekends such as Fort Boyard.

On 13 January 2025, Arcom announced a re-numbering of DTT channels, including the move of France 4 from channel 14 to channel 4, until then occupied by Canal+, from 6 June 2025. Since then, the Culturebox brand ended and France 4 uses its brand for cultural programs at night, with the permanent france.tv being shown during programs like the other channels from the France Télévisions network. Programs such as "Les Estivales de Culturebox" (The Summer Festival of Culturebox) were renamed coincide with the channel's cultural night time programing, becoming "Les Estivales de France 4".

The channel's upgrade also led to France Télévisions wish of reinforcing the channel's programing as well as developing a strong access prime-time case. It was announced in late June that the program Les Maternelles (originally broadcast on France 5, lately broadcast on France 2) would fill the access prime-time case from 7:40 pm to 9 pm.

== Audience share ==
In May 2021, Culturebox started timesharing with France 4 which led to the percentage decreasing. This is explained by the channel only being measured during the children's programming in daytime and Culturebox counting as independent from France 4. However, Culturebox stopped being an independent entity in August, which led to the audiences being recalculated at night.

The audiences of France 4 were not calculated from January 2022 to May 2025 due mostly to the timeshare with Culturebox. However, the audiences were recalculated in June 2025, after the channel was brought on the channel 4 and Culturebox disappeared.

	January	February	March	April	May	June	July	August	September	October	November	December	Annual average
2007	-	-	-	-	0.4%	0.5%	0.5%	0.6%	0.5%	0.4%	0.5%	0.6%	0.4%
2008	0.6%	0.6%	0.7%	0.8%	0.9%	0.8%	0.9%	0.9%	0.9%	1.1%	1.1%	1.1%	▲0.9%
2009	1.0%	1.0%	1.0%	1.0%	1.1%	1.0%	1.0%	1.0%	1.0%	1.2%	1.2%	1.3%	▲1.1%
2010	1.4%	1.4%	1.6%	1.7%	1.7%	1.6%	1.5%	1.5%	1.6%	1.7%	1.7%	1.8%	▲1.6%
2011	1.7%	1.7%	1.8%	1.8%	2.0%	2.1%	2.0%	2.1%	2.0%	1.9%	2.0%	2.3%	▲2.0%
2012	2.3%	2.2%	2.0%	2.0%	2.3%	2.2%	2.0%	2.2%	2.1%	2.0%	2.0%	1.9%	▲2.1%
2013	1.7%	1.6%	1.6%	1.7%	2.0%	1.9%	1.8%	1.8%	1.7%	1.9%	1.7%	1.7%	▼1.8%
2014	1.7%	1.6%	1.7%	1.5%	1.6%	1.5%	1.6%	2.1%	1.6%	1.5%	1.3%	1.4%	▼1.6%
2015	1.5%	1.6%	1.6%	1.7%	1.7%	1.7%	1.8%	1.8%	1.8%	1.9%	1.6%	1.9%	▲1.7%
2016	1.9%	1.9%	1.9%	2.0%	2.0%	1.7%	2.0%	2.1%	1.8%	2.0%	1.8%	1.9%	▲1.9%
2017	1.9%	1.8%	1.7%	1.7%	1.8%	2.0%	2.1%	1.9%	1.8%	1.7%	1.5%	1.5%	▼1.8%
2018	1.7%	1.7%	1.6%	1.6%	1.7%	1.6%	1.6%	1.8%	1.6%	1.6%	1.4%	1.5%	▼1.6%
2019	1.7%	1.6%	1.6%	1.6%	1.7%	1.6%	1.6%	1.7%	1.6%	1.7%	1.6%	1.5%	1.6%
2020	1.6%	1.4%	1.3%	1.2%	1,1%	1,1%	1,3%	1,3%	1,1%	1,0%	0,8%	0,9%	▼1,2%
2021	0,9%	1,0%	0,9%	1,0%	0,4%	0,7%	0,8%	0,9%	0,7%	0,7%	0,7%	0,8%	▼0,8%
2025	-	-	-	-	-	1,1%	1,1%						

== Visual identity ==
=== Logos ===
Logo of Festival from 2000 to 2005

Logo of France 4 from 2005 to 2008

Logo of France 4 from 2008 to 2011 and 2014 to 2018, also used as a secondary logo from 2011 to 2014

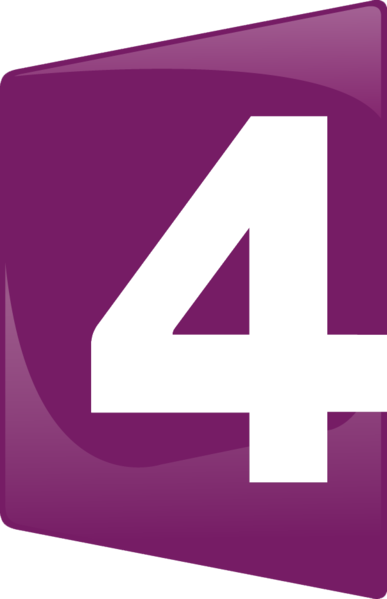
2014 version used from 2014 to 2018

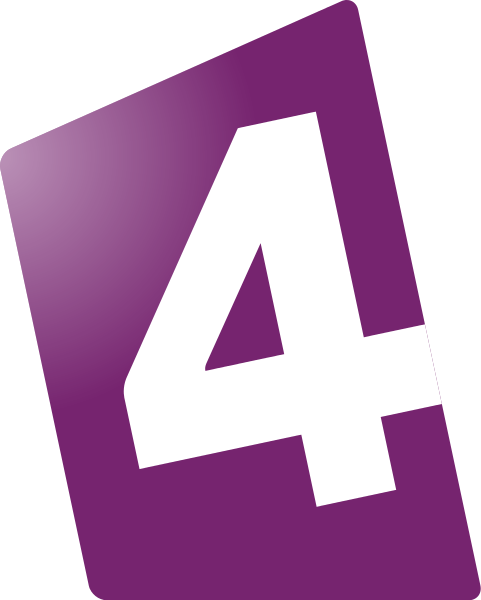
Logo of France 4 from September 2011 to April 2014

Logo of France 4 HD from 2011 to 2018

Logo of France 4 from 2018

On-screen logo of France 4 from 2018

Logo of France Télévisions (france.tv) displayed on screen from July 6th 2025 on France 4.

== Culturebox ==
Culturebox
- Final logo, used from 2021 to 2025
- Network: France 4
- Launched: 20 October 2008; 18 years ago (Online); 1 February 2021; 5 years ago (TV channel)
- Closed: 6 June 2025; 17 months ago (TV channel)
- Division of: France Télévisions
- Country of origin: France
- Key people: Michel Field (editorial director)
- Headquarters: Paris, France
- Format: Cultural programming
- Running time: ~9 pm – 5 am (UTC+1/UTC+2)
- Original language: French
- Official website: www.france.tv/spectacles-et-culture/

Culturebox was an online brand of France Télévisions, focusing on cultural programming, including the arts, documentaries, cinema and music. From 3 May 2021 to 6 June 2025, it operated as a programming block, timesharing on France 4 with Okoo, each day from around 8pm until 5am the next day.

Among other programmes, Culturebox has broadcast the semi-finals of the Eurovision Song Contest since 2021. The average number of viewers of the channel between February and April 2021 has been estimated at 25.6 million per month.

=== Brand history ===
A former web logo (2018)

Culturebox was initially launched as a website in October 2008 by France 3 as a cultural platform, offering on the internet a selection of subjects broadcast on the channel's national and regional news editions. On 19 June 2013, the website became the cultural platform of the France Télévisions group, changing its content to offering shows (theatre plays & concerts); some of which were broadcast live. In 2016, following the launch of the television channel France Info, a program devoted to cultural news was launched under the name of Culturebox, and presented by Leïla Kaddour-Boudadi.

=== Broadcast ===
On 1 February 2021 at 8:35pm, Culturebox was launched as a separate channel in mainland France taking the EPG position of France Ô, closed a few months before. The channel was available on channel 19 in terrestrial in mainland France only. France 4 and France Info were downgraded to SD to make room on the multiplex.

After this initial run ended, the Minister of Culture announced an extension of the channel as a time-share during the evenings on France 4, which returned to HD on terrestrial.

== See also ==
- France Télévisions
- Culturebox
- Okoo (Children's programming block on France 3, France 4 and France 5)
