= World Press Freedom Day =

International day to raise awareness for press freedom

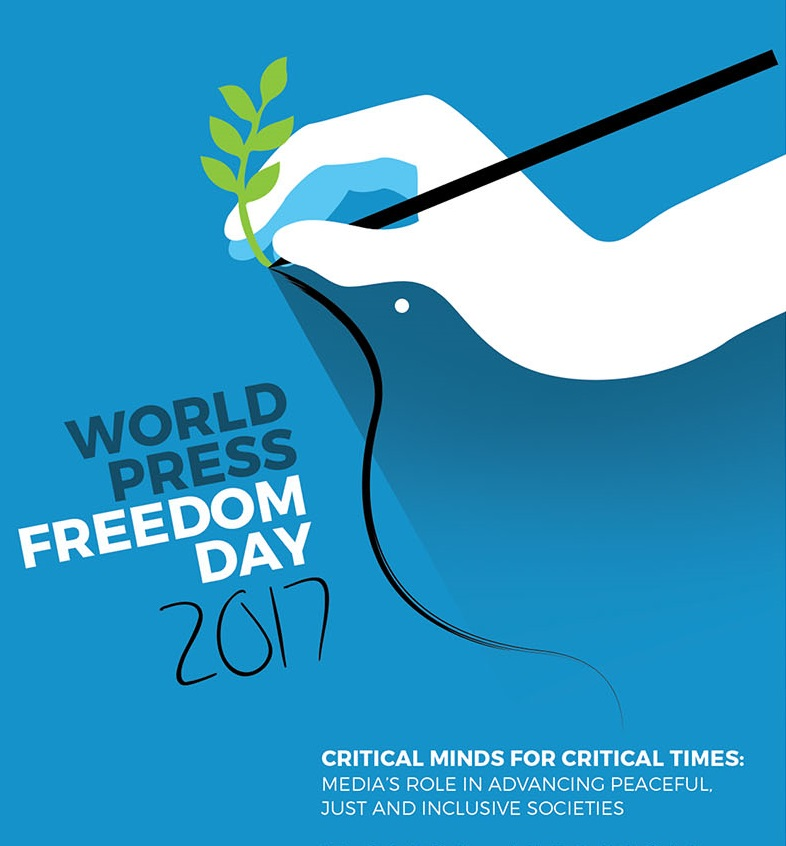
- World Press Freedom Day 2017 poster
- Observed by: UNESCO
- Celebrations: UNESCO
- Date: May 3
- Next time: May 3, 2027
- Frequency: Annual
- Related to: Celebrates the fundamental principles of press freedom, to evaluate press freedom around the world, to defend the media from attacks on their independence and to pay tribute to journalists who have lost their lives in the exercise of their profession.

In December 1993, the United Nations General Assembly declared May 3 to be World Press Freedom Day (also called World Press Day), in order to raise awareness of the importance of freedom of the press. Its intent was to remind governments of their duty to respect and uphold the right to freedom of expression enshrined under Article 19 of the 1948 Universal Declaration of Human Rights.

== History ==
The date of May 3 was chosen because it marks the anniversary of the Windhoek Declaration, a statement of free press principles issued by African newspaper journalists who had gathered in Windhoek, Namibia under the auspices of UNESCO in 1991.

2025 Press Freedom Index Good situation Satisfactory situation Noticeable problems Difficult situation Very serious situation Not classified / No data

In 2018, a conference sponsored by the United Nations Alliance of Civilizations was canceled. In 2018, several news organizations joined for an ad campaign. Slain journalists in Kabul were remembered.

== Prizes ==
GIS Director, Clement Wulf-Soulage in 2017

UNESCO marks World Press Freedom Day by conferring the UNESCO/Guillermo Cano World Press Freedom Prize on a deserving individual, organisation or institution that has made an outstanding contribution to the defence and/or promotion of press freedom anywhere in the world, especially when this has been achieved in the face of danger. Created in 1997, the prize is awarded on the recommendation of an independent jury of 14 news professionals. Names are submitted by regional and international non-governmental organisations working for press freedom, and by UNESCO member states.

The Prize is named in honour of Guillermo Cano Isaza, a Colombian journalist who was assassinated in front of the offices of his newspaper, El Espectador, in Bogotá, on 17 December 1986. Cano's writings had offended Colombia's powerful drug barons.

== UNESCO conference ==
UNESCO also marks World Press Freedom Day each year by bringing together media professionals, press freedom organisations and UN agencies to assess the state of press freedom worldwide and discuss solutions for addressing challenges. Each conference is centred on a theme related to press freedom, including good governance, media coverage of terrorism, impunity and the role of media in post-conflict countries.

=== List ===
Year	City	Theme
1998	England London	"Press Freedom is a Cornerstone of Human Rights."
1999	Colombia Bogotá	"Turbulent Eras: Generational Perspectives on Freedom of the Press."
2000	Switzerland Genève	"Reporting the News in a Dangerous World: The Role of the Media in conflict settlement, Reconciliation and peace-building."
2001 (Note: Held jointly with the commemoration of the 10th Anniversary of the Windhoek Declaration. The occasion was marked by the signing of the African Charter on Broadcasting.)	Namibia Windhoek	"Combating racism and promoting diversity: the role of free press."
2002	Philippines Manila	"Covering the War on Global Terrorism."
2003	Jamaica Kingston	"The Media and Armed Conflict."
2004	Serbia Belgrade	"Who decides how much information?".
2005	Senegal Dakar	"Media and Good Governance".
2006	Sri Lanka Colombo	"The media as drivers of change."
2007	Colombia Medellín	"The United Nations and the freedom of press."
2008	Mozambique Maputo	"Celebrating the fundamental principles of press freedom."
2009	Qatar Doha	"Dialogue, mutual understanding and reconciliation."
2010	Australia Brisbane	"Freedom of information: the right to know".
2011	United States Washington, D.C.	"21st Century Media: New Frontiers, New Barriers".
2012	Tunisia Tunis	"New Voices: Media Freedom Helping to Transform Societies"
2013	Costa Rica San José	"Safe to Speak: Securing Freedom of Expression in All Media".
2014	France Paris	"Media Freedom for a Better Future: Shaping the post-2015 Development Agenda".
2015	Latvia Riga	"Let Journalism Thrive! Towards Better Reporting, Gender Equality, & Media Safety in the Digital Age".
2016	Finland Helsinki	"Access to Information and Fundamental Freedoms".
2017	Indonesia Jakarta	"Critical Minds for Critical Times: Media's role in advancing peaceful, just and inclusive societies".
2018	Ghana Accra	"Keeping Power in Check: Media, Justice and the Rule of Law".
2019	Ethiopia Addis Ababa	"Media for Democracy: Journalism and Elections In Times of Disinformation".
2020	Netherlands The Hague	"Journalism without Fear or Favour".
2021	Namibia Windhoek	"Information as a Public Good"
2022	Uruguay Punta Del Este	"Journalism under Digital Siege".
2023	United States New York City	"Shaping a Future of Rights: Freedom of expression as a driver for all other human rights".
2024	Chile, Santiago de Chile	"A Press for the Planet: Journalism in the face of the environmental crisis".
2025	Belgium, Brussels	"Reporting in the Brave New World: The Impact of Artificial Intelligence on Press Freedom and the Media".
2026	Zambia, Lusaka	"Shaping a Future at Peace: Promoting Press Freedom for Human Rights, Development, and Security".

== See also ==
- Article 19, an international organisation
- International Day to End Impunity for Crimes Against Journalists
- Investigative journalism
- Media transparency
- Reporters Without Borders
- World Association of Newspapers and News Publishers
