= France 24 =

French public service international news television network

- Type: Broadcasting news, discussions, public service broadcasting
- Country: France
- Broadcast area: Worldwide • North America

Programming
- Languages: French, English, Arabic and Spanish
- Picture format: 1080i (HDTV)

Ownership
- Owner: France Médias Monde (Government of France)
- Key people: Alain de Pouzilhac; Marc Saikali

History
- Launched: 6 December 2006; 19 years ago
- Former names: Chaîne française d'Information internationale (before July 2006)

Links
- Website: www.france24.com/en/

Availability

Terrestrial
- Digital terrestrial television (Île-de-France): Channel 33
- Digital terrestrial television (United Kingdom): Channel 266 & 271 (HbbTV)
- Digital terrestrial television (Italy): Channel 136, 143 & 154 (20:00–8:00); Channel 76 (Aosta Valley); Channel 241 (HbbTV)
- Levira (Estonia): Channel 8
- Freenet TV (Germany): HbbTV
- Digital terrestrial television (United States): Channel 33.1 (Fajardo, PR); Channel 38.1 (Macon, GA); Channel 60.2 (San Francisco); Channel 2.5 (Las Vegas, NV); Channel 5.10 (Wichita, KS); Channel 35.4 (Memphis, TN); Channel 26.4 (Atlanta, GA)
- Oqaab (Afghanistan): Channel 46
- Zuku TV (Kenya): Channel 566 (English) (Zuku Fiber only); Channel 813 (Arabic) (Zuku Fiber only); Channel 822 (French) (Zuku Fiber only)
- Open View: Channel 121 (English)
- Signet (Kenya): Channel number varies

Streaming media
- Canal Digital Live App: Watch Live

France 24 (France vingt-quatre in French) is a French state-owned publicly funded international news television network based in Paris. Its channels, broadcast in French, English, Arabic and Spanish, are aimed at the overseas market.

Based in the Paris suburb of Issy-les-Moulineaux, the service started on 6 December 2006. It is aimed at a worldwide market and is generally broadcast by pay television providers around the world, but additionally, in 2010, France 24 began online broadcasts in its iOS and Android applications. It is a provider of live streaming world news which can be viewed via YouTube, and various mobile devices and digital media players. The stated mission of the channels is to "provide a global public service and a common editorial stance".

Since 2008 the channel has been wholly owned by the French government, via its holding company France Médias Monde, having bought out the minority share of the former partners: Groupe TF1 and France Télévisions. The budget of France Médias Monde (France 24, RFI and MCD) is approximately €300 million per year. The current director of France 24 is Vanessa Burggraf.

== Programming ==
"The News" title card from 9 January 2011 to 11 December 2013

France 24 is broadcast on four channels: in French, in English, in Arabic and in Spanish. Their playout is outsourced to Red Bee Media.

France 24's programming is divided more or less equally between news coverage and news magazines or special reports.

Along with 260 journalists of its own, France 24 can call on the resources of the two main French broadcasters (Groupe TF1 and France Télévisions) as well as partners such as AFP and RFI.

In 2016, France 24 started sharing its French language night-time programming with the France-based France Info. According to Marie-Christine Saragosse, president and CEO of France Médias Monde, "part of the value added of this public channel" would be the fact that "[France 24 journalists] will be wide awake while others would be sleeping".

== History ==
=== Channel inception ===
The channel was created with the backing of president Jacques Chirac, with the aim of providing a French perspective of the news, which was dominated by English-language media outlets.

=== First project (1986–1999) ===
In 1986, then French Prime Minister Jacques Chirac expressed his desire for an international television news channel in French and had requested a report into the activities of current international broadcasts from France (Radio France Internationale, TV5, and to a certain extent Réseau France Outre-Mer) and noted the collective offering was "fragmented, disorganised and ineffective."

With the arrival of François Mitterrand as president in 1981 and the naming of Michel Rocard as prime minister in 1989, the government launched a new project, Canal France International (CFI), a package of programmes aimed at making programmes in French for foreign audiences, particularly in Africa, to be developed in parallel as a television channel.

The First Gulf War of 1990, relayed across the world by CNN International in particular, revealed the power of international news channels and their role in the formation of opinion. A parliamentary minister, Philippe Séguin, wished to create a French-language equivalent.

In 1996 to 1999, after nineteen governmental reports in ten years, Prime Minister Alain Juppé asked Radio France Internationale president Jean-Paul Cluzel (who was also General Inspector of Finances) to create a French international news channel. Cluzel proposed in 1998 to group TV5, RFI, and CFI within a corporation entitled Téléfi. The UMP-led government decided to follow that recommendation but, with the return of the Socialist Party to government and the nomination of Hubert Védrine, the new Minister of Foreign Affairs, favoured the augmentation of existing outlets such as TV5, which started to produce its own programming, notably its news bulletins, which in turn created its own news team.

Additionally with the creation of EuroNews in 1993 (with French-language commentary), the media presence of France overseas became more complex, more fragmented, and costlier, without being able to rely on a true round-the-clock international news channel.

=== Relaunched project (2000–2004) ===
In 2002, President Jacques Chirac relaunched the project to create a French international news channel:

Is it understandable that year after year we are still lamenting our persistent failure with news and the French-language media on the international scene? Admittedly, we have with Agence France-Presse a remarkable information tool that we must continue to reinforce, notably in its international mission. Indeed, everyone here recognises the recent progress made by RFI, by TV5, by CFI, thanks to the efforts of their teams and to the determination of the public bodies. But everybody notices that we are still far from having a large international news channel in French, capable of competing with the BBC or CNN.

— President Jacques Chirac, Address given at an Élysée Palace reception on 12 February 2002, in honour of the High Council of the Francophonie.

The recent crises have shown the handicap that a country suffers, a cultural area, which doesn't possess a sufficient weight in the battle of the images and the airwaves. Let us question, in the time of terrestrial television networks, of satellite, of the internet, on our organisation in this domain, and notably in the dissipation of public funds which are reserved to them.

On 7 March, speaking in the French Senate in front of foreign delegates to France, and as part of his presidential campaign, Chirac said, "We must have the ambition of a big, round-the-clock news channel in French, equal to the BBC or CNN for the English-speaking world. It is essential for the influence of our country. For our expatriates, it would be a live and an immediate link to the mainland"

After his reelection, the first reflections were engaged at the Ministry of Foreign Affairs, headed by Dominique de Villepin. Various technical options were examined at the time, in an unreleased report:

- The purchase of EuroNews by the French state
- Creation of an external channel, proposed by then-France Télévisions President Marc Tessier, approved by the previous government
- An international version of LCI, proposed by Groupe TF1, which asked for a state subvention for the service
- Strengthening TV5's news service, as suggested by the Ministry of Foreign Affairs

The subsequent wars in Afghanistan and Iraq reassured the authorities about the project, especially in February 2003, when the American broadcasters CNN, FOX News, and MSNBC opted not to broadcast the long applause given by the members of the United Nations Security Council after Dominique de Villepin gave his address on the Iraq conflict.

On 19 March 2003, Matignon opened offers to:

Elicit the development of an international news channel. Broadcasting primarily in the French language, this service will assure a more important and more visible presence of France in the worldwide battle of images, and to contribute to the pluralism of international information by offering to our viewers the choice of a different viewpoint on the news, marked by a singular point of view of our country on world affairs, by its culture and by its own ideas, and to value its historical links and its privileged geography. The international news channel must contribute to a long-lasting strategy of influence of France in the world.

By the application deadline on 22 April 2003, three candidates replied:

- France Télévisions and RFI: to operate a channel entirely run by the public service sector;
- Groupe TF1: proposed an international version of its LCI channel;
- Groupe Canal+: proposed a news "factory" to reinforce its i>Télé channel, already seen in 47 countries but running at a financial loss.

One month later, a parliamentary commission gave its conclusion, voted with a unanimous decision by its members in the National Assembly, to form a public-owned corporation (groupement d'intérêt public) grouping all of the public broadcasters (France Télévisions, RFO, RFI, TV5 and AFP) with the goal of launching the channel at the end of 2004.

Ignoring the work of the parliamentary commission, the government asked a member of the assembly, Bernard Brochand, to form a partnership between the applying candidates for the international channel, something which the parliamentary commission did not demand. Brochard unsuccessfully attempted to group both Groupe TF1 and Groupe Canal+. He then proposed a 50/50 partnership between France Télévisions and Groupe TF1 (whilst at the same time rejecting RFI), both groups possessing the technical means and experience of broadcasting externally: TF1 with its LCI channel and France Télévisions' editorial teams at France 2 and France 3.

=== Preparing for launch (2004–2006) ===
==== Defying parliament ====
After a press conference in January 2004, President Chirac wished for a launch of the channel towards the end of the year. However, various disputes began to surface. The ministers of the assembly that voted were angry that the recommendations voted for in the parliamentary commission were thrown out in favour of one prepared outside the parliamentary framework. Unionised journalists working for France Télévisions denounced the potential alliance with the private sector, calling it "the marriage of the snake and the rabbit"; Radio France International was angry that it would not be associated with the project. A headline published in Le Monde described the partnership having a "public channel, private owner", while other sections of the press criticised its modest budget of 80 million euro (compared with 600 million euro for BBC World). Finally the Minister for Foreign Affairs had worried that the budget would take away from existing funded channels such as TV5.

Facing discontentment, the cabinet of Prime Minister Jean-Pierre Raffarin delayed all discussion of the project in 2004. Then Foreign Minister Michel Barnier announced on 21 July that the channel would not be funded before 2007, which was confirmed by a vote in parliament on the Finance Bill.

However, the Prime Minister acceded to pressure from the Élysée; a press conference by Raffarin on 9 December confirmed the launch of the new news channel in 2005, "I have decided to accept the proposed joint venture proposed by France Télévisions and TF1. As desired by the President, the new channel will draw on the talents of major French television companies, and will promote the expression of a French vision, more necessary than ever in the world today. The Government will present an amendment to the Finance Bill to provide for the start of the channel, to a total of 30 million euro." The amendment was carried the same day in the National Assembly.

==== Public-private angst ====
The start of 2005 concerned obtaining the authorisation necessary from the European Union and the relevant competition commissions. Trade union members working for France Télévisions continued to voice opposition to the project and circulated a petition in March 2005. The newly elected president of the public corporation, Patrick de Carolis, who assumed his position in the summer (and who had been accused of being too close to the President), expressed doubts about an alliance with TF1, "To be effective, you need a single driver in a car".

He insisted that the channel be made available within France, which the members of parliament required, and which TF1, wanting to protect its own news channel LCI, could object to. Patrick Le Lay, president of TF1, gave his blessing for the channel to be broadcast domestically and wished the direction of the channel to alternate every six months between the two parties, and eventually a supervisory board devolved to France Télévisions. These few amendments needed new authorisation from the French and European authorities, obtained this time round without difficulty.

=== Birth (2006–2008) ===
The launch of the channel was made official after a statement to the cabinet of the Ministry of Culture and Communication, headed by Renaud Donnedieu de Vabres on 30 November 2005, "The project of the International French News Channel (abbreviated in French to CFII)[...] will allow us to propose our own country's vision of world events and to reinforce its presence in the world."

Alain de Pouzilhac, former CEO of Havas, was named president, along with two deputies, one each from group partners TF1 and France Télévisions.

Prime Minister Jean-Pierre Raffarin declared that CFII, against the wishes of TF1, would be broadcast within mainland France. However, TF1 wished to launch its news channel LCI onto the digital terrestrial platform. In order to placate TF1, CFII was due to be broadcast via satellite and cable.

On 22 April 2006, Le Monde announced that the managers of the forthcoming channel found its initial name difficult to pronounce (CFII, in French pronounced as C-F-I-I or C-F-2-I). A new name was announced on 30 June 2006, "France 24" (pronounced "France vingt-quatre"). This decision was taken by the supervisory board, chaired by France Télévision president Patrick de Carolis, who made the choice from a list of five potential names.

France 24 launched on 6 December 2006 at 20:30 CET, initially available online as a web stream, followed by satellite distribution a day later, covering France and the rest of Europe, the Middle East, Africa and the United States (specifically airing in New York State and the District of Columbia using two channels: one in English and the other in French). Since April 2007 the channel increased its reach, airing programmes in Arabic for viewers in the Maghreb, North Africa and the Middle East.

Two months after launch, a survey conducted by TNS Sofres indicated that 75% of respondents in France questioned thought France 24 was "useful and essential", but questions have arisen concerning the France 24 name being too Franco-centric for an international news channel.

==== State takes over ====
In 2008 Groupe TF1 ceded its share in the channel to a government-owned holding company, Société de l'audiovisuel extérieur de la France (AEF), whilst conversely committing to producing programmes for the channel until 2015.

Despite the launch of France 24, the fragmentation of public broadcasting overseas continues. The total budget for external broadcasting from France totalled 300 million euro each year. Following the election of Nicolas Sarkozy as president in May 2007, a "steering committee" of twenty members was called in with view to reform in June 2007. President Sarkozy called on Bernard Kouchner and Christine Albanel, respectively Foreign Minister and Culture Minister to reform the current system. The proposition of reform was met with concern from Belgium, Switzerland and Canada/Québec, as the public broadcasters involved in TV5 (of which the French government holds a 49% share whilst the three aforementioned countries hold 11% each) consider TV5 to be a promoter of the wider French-language world. Just one month after France 24's launch, TV5 renamed itself TV5Monde.

As published in the Journal Officiel de la République Française of 23 January 2009, a Decree for 23 January 2009 appeared, "authorising the company France Télévisions to cede its share in the capital of the France 24 company". The same Decree transferred its share to the Société de l'audiovisuel extérieur de la France (AEF), which made AEF sole shareholder of France 24, for the sum of 4 million euro.

=== Under one maison (2008–present) ===
President Nicolas Sarkozy announced on 8 January 2008 that he was in favour of reducing France 24's programming to French only.

In January 2012 AEF announced a merger between France 24 and Radio France International, a procedure finalised on 13 February 2012. It is expected that staff from Radio France International (which includes Arabic sister-station Monte Carlo Doualiya) will move to premises currently home to France 24. Alain de Pouzilhac, president of AEF stated in Le Monde, "We have just created a French audiovisual group of international dimensions, that aspires to be powerful and ambitious; [the merger] is irreversible and is definitive"

102 posts, of which 85 from RFI, were cut preceding the official merger. Editorial teams, technical and distribution, financial and human resources departments of both France 24 and RFI were involved. On 13 February 2012 the merger of France 24 and RFI was made official.

A new logo and graphics package was unveiled on 12 December 2013, updating the 2006 logo; however, the symbol has remained, but the shape was turned into a square. And the new graphic device is the shade of white and blue, that they move left or right, at the end of each promo and on-air graphics. On screen, a black tickerbar shows every top story in order, and on the white bar, it says the name of the website, which is "FRANCE24.COM" in capital letters. At the same time, new intros were given for its News, Weather, and other programmes. While on 1 June 2015, on 10:00 and 17:00, the News from France 24 will have access to audio description for visually and hearing impaired equipment.

=== Long-term goals ===
France 24 aims to compete with leading English-language international news channels BBC World News and CNN International. Its intention is to put more emphasis on debate, dialogue and the role of cultural differences. It also competes with Deutsche Welle, Al Jazeera English, and NHK World news channels. The Arabic programming competes with Al Jazeera's Arabic service, RT Arabic, BBC Arabic and Sky News Arabia. A new Spanish-language channel for the Latin American market broadcasting from Bogotá, Colombia, launched in September 2017, competing with CNN en Español, DW (Español), NTN24, TeleSUR, RT en español and CGTN Spanish.

The French government allocated around €100 million for the project. The European Commission gave the green light to France 24 in June 2006, saying it did not breach European Union state-aid rules.

=== Overnight simulcast ===
From 2 September 2016, The French news channel, France Info, started simulcasting France 24's French channel from midnight to 6 am daily, when the channel doesn't broadcast live except for newscasts every half-hour.

However, from 20 March 2017, on weekdays, France Info started simulcasting France 24 until 6:30 am, due to the main presenter Laurent Bignolas anchoring the early newscast on France 2 Le 6h Info, which isn't simulcast on France Info.

== Organisation ==
From its creation in 2006 to 2008, France 24 is managed by a management board and a supervisory board. In 2008, the French State bought the shares of the two shareholders for an amount of 2 million euros each. Since then, France 24 has been a chain of the national program company France Médias Monde (formerly Exterior Audiovisual of France), 100% owned by the French State through the Agence des participations de l'État (APE, lit. 'State Participations Agency').

Previous directors of France 24 include Marc Saikali.

France 24 had two main sources of funding: the audiovisual license fee (French: la Redevance audiovisuelle) (France's version of the Television license fee (French: la Redevance télé)), paid by each household equipped with a television, and the state subsidy until 2022. Since 2022, France's audiovisual license fee was abolished and the funding source for France 24 that took its place was revenue from France's Value-added tax (VAT) (French: Taxe sur la Valeur Ajoutée (TVA)).

== Shows and presenters ==
=== Main programmes ===
France 24 (English) Mon-Thu
Program	Time slot	Anchor
Day Break	06:00–09:00	Eve Irvine
The World Today	09:00–12:00	Stuart Norval
Paris Direct	12:00–15:00	Genie Godula
Around the World	15:00–18:00	Nadia Massih
World View	18:00–20:00	François Picard
Prime News Paris	20:00–22:00	Mark Owen
World Roundup	22:00–00:00	Sharon Gaffney
Night Watch	00:00–06:00	James Mullholland and Alexander Aucott

France 24 (English) Fri–Sun
Program	Time slot	Anchor
Day Break	06:00–10:00	Haxie Meyers-Belkin
Paris Direct	10:00–14:00	William Hilderbrandt
Around the World	14:00–18:00	Erin Ogunkeye
World View	18:00–21:00	Gavin Lee
World Roundup	21:00–00:00	Jean-Emile Jammine
Night Watch	00:00–06:00	James Mullholland and Alexander Aucott

France 24 (French) Mon-Thu
Program	Time slot	Anchor
A La Une	06:00–09:00	Damien Coquet
Parlons-En	09:00–12:00	Pauline Paccard
Paris Direct	12:00–15:00	Elisabeth Allain
Autour du Monde	15:00–18:00	Julien Fanciulli
Au Coeur de L'Info	18:00–20:00	Stephanie Antoine
L'Essentiel	20:00–22:00	Raphael Kahane
L'Actu 360	22:00–00:00	Claire Hilderbrandt

France 24 (French) Fri-Sun
Program	Time slot	Anchor
A la Une	06:00–10:00	Philome Robert
Paris Direct	10:00–14:00	Judith Grimaldi
Autour du Monde	14:00–18:00	Nabia Makhloufi-Oussibrahim
Au Coeur de l'Info	18:00–21:00	Achren Verdian
L'Essentiel	21:00–00:00	Marion Gaudin

=== Special programmes ===
- Across Africa – hosted by Georja Calvin-Smith (weekly in-depth review of Africa political and social developments); replaced This Week in the Maghreb
- Beyond Business
- The Business Interview – hosted by Raphael Kahane
- Business Matters – hosted by Stéphane Marchand, Pierre Briançon
- Culture – hosted by Genie Godula
- Culture Critique – hosted by Augustin Trapenard on literature, Amobe Mevegue on music, Sean Rose on exhibitions, Lisa Nesselson on cinema and Stephen Clarke
- The Debate – hosted by François Picard (live debate of current major issues with 4 panelists)
- Environment – hosted by Eve Irvine
- Europe District – Christophe Robeet
- Eye on Africa – hosted by Georja Calvin-Smith (daily news from Africa)
- Fashion
- Focus
- France Bon Appétit
- Health – hosted by Eve Irvine
- In the Papers – hosted by James Creedon
- In the Weeklies
- The Interview
- Lifestyle
- Media Watch
- Middle East Matters
- The Observers – hosted by Derek Thomson
- Perspective
- People and Profit, hosted by Kate Moody
- Planet Hope – hosted by Louise Hannah
- Politics
- Reporters – hosted by Mark Owen
- Talking Europe
- Talking Points
- Tech 24 – hosted by Peter O'Brien
- This Week in Asia – hosted by Claire Pryde
- This Week in Europe – hosted by Rebecca Bowring
- This Week in France – hosted by Nadia Charbit
- This Week in the Americas – hosted by Annette Young
- This Week in the Maghreb – hosted by Georja Calvin-Smith; discontinued; replaced by Across Africa
- This Week in the Middle East – hosted by Lanah Kammourieh
- Top Story
- Vice Versa
- Web News

== Availability ==
Inaugural news presenter, François Picard

The News title 2006–2011

France 24 is available by satellite in most of Europe, Africa, and the Middle East, as well as by cable and antenna in the US cities of Albany, Atlanta, Macon, and San Francisco. In the United States, Canada, and Central and South America, France 24 is represented by the American telecommunications company New Line Television, headquartered in Miami, Florida. As of August 2010, the network also became available to subscribers to the satellite television Dish Network. As of November 2022, France 24 is available for streaming on Roku devices. An hour of France 24 news in English is shown in the United States on Free Speech TV at 6 pm Eastern and 2 am Eastern and on Link TV. In Australia several of France 24's news programs are broadcast on multilingual broadcaster SBS as part of its World Watch programming.

The French, English, Arabic, and Spanish channels are all available live on the France 24 website, broadcast en direct (live). On 1 April 2007, the Irish terrestrial channel TG4, which is an Irish-language TV channel, began carrying retransmissions of France 24 overnight. Previously, it had retransmitted Euronews. France 24 was also available on Livestation.

In 2007, France 24 started a VOD service on Virgin Media, allowing customers to access weekly news updates and programmes to watch when they choose. The use of a free application means that France 24 is also available live and VOD on mobile phones throughout the world. An official App for the iPhone has also been released.

In October 2009, France24 relaunched its website France24.com with a complete video archive as well as a video-on-demand service whereby the viewer may watch any of the three channels with the ability to replay the past 24 hours of programming anytime. On 1 March 2010, France 24 released live streaming with experimental automatic transcription in association with Yacast Media, the search engine Exalead, Vocapia Research, and Microsoft.

On 2 March 2010, Iran blocked the news website of this French broadcaster.

On 9 January 2011, France 24's English and French channels officially switched to 16:9 widescreen at 02:00 CET, and the Arabic channel switched to widescreen later that day at 06:00 CET. Graphics were modified to fit the new format. The studio design was not altered. The video player at France24.com was also amended to accommodate the new format.

France 24 is a supporter of the Hybrid Broadcast Broadband TV (HbbTV) initiative, which is promoting and establishing an open European standard for hybrid set-top boxes for the reception of broadcast TV and broadband multimedia applications with a single user interface, and has announced that it will launch an HbbTV interactive news service in 2012 via the Astra 19.2°E satellites with support from Orange and SES.

In New Zealand, the channels are available via Sky Network Television on channel 100 (English) and 101 (French). It is available via Now TV, whilst in Hong Kong and in Sri Lanka this channel is available via Sri Lanka Telecom Peo TV on channel 27. In Pakistan, the channel is available on most cable systems, PTCL Smart TV and NayaTel.

On 3 October 2014, France 24 began live streaming the channel on YouTube.

On 25 September 2017, France 24 launched a Spanish-language channel, whose newsroom is located in Bogotá, Colombia. Its local partner is Televideo (Mediapro Colombia). As of May 2020, it broadcasts 18 hours of programming a day (13:00 Paris time/06:00 Bogotá time – 05:00 Paris time/22:00 Bogotá time), and simulcasting the English-language channel during the remaining time (early hours in South America).

On 9 January 2018, France 24 was pulled from Spectrum cable TV.

In 2019, France 24 joined the line-up of channels provided by Channelbox in the UK on Freeview channel 271, joining its feed via the Vision TV Network on channel 264. However, as of 2020, only the French-language version of the news service was being broadcast in the UK.

On 1 August 2020, France 24 was launched on OpenView in South Africa as a replacement for BBC World News.

In August 2021, when the streaming service, France Channel, launched in the United States, the service launched with a partnership with France 24's parent holding company France Médias Monde, which allows subscribers of France Channel to watch livestreams of both the English and the French versions of the network.

France 24 English and French are available in Quebec including Eastern Western parts of Canada.

== Criticism ==
On 27 March 2023, Burkina Faso ordered the cessation of France 24's broadcasting on its territory. This decision was made following the airing of an interview with the leader of Al-Qaeda in the Islamic Maghreb (AQIM). Burkinabé authorities accused France 24 of providing "a platform for legitimizing terrorist actions and hate speech propagated to fulfill the malicious intentions of this organization in Burkina Faso." The announcement was made by government spokesperson Jean-Emmanuel Ouedraogo. The French authorities contested the decision, saying they had a "consistent and resolute commitment to press freedom." A European Union spokesperson also considered this commitment as compatible with the fight against terrorism. The government of Niger also suspended France 24 following the 2023 Nigerien coup d'état.

On 27 July 2023, the state-owned Algeria Press Service openly criticized the channel in an article, labeling it a "trash channel" and stated it is "controlled by the Élysée", in response to its reporting on the 2023 North Africa wildfires. The agency accused France 24 of slanted coverage regarding the aid provided and measures taken, focusing solely on the Kabylia region and singling out Algeria, even though the fires affected the wider Mediterranean basin.

In June 2026, the management and editorial committee of FRANCE 24 issued a joint statement criticizing pressure placed on journalists Nina Masson and Yong Chim. The pressure occurred after the journalists questioned an open letter concerning media executive Vincent Bollore. The network's leadership categorized the incident as a violation of press freedom.

On September 17, 2026, France 24's broadcast was suspended and the press accreditation of all correspondents, special envoys, and correspondents was withdrawn by the HAC after qualifying the Guinean president Mamadi Doumbouya of a coup-leading president, whereas he was elected president in the presidential elections held on December 28, 2025.

== See also ==
- BBC
- CNN International
- Deutsche Welle
- Euronews
- RT
- KBS World
- Le Canal Nouvelles
- Réseau de l'information
- International broadcasting
- International news channels
- Television in France
- State media
