= France 5 =

French TV channel released on October 16, 1999

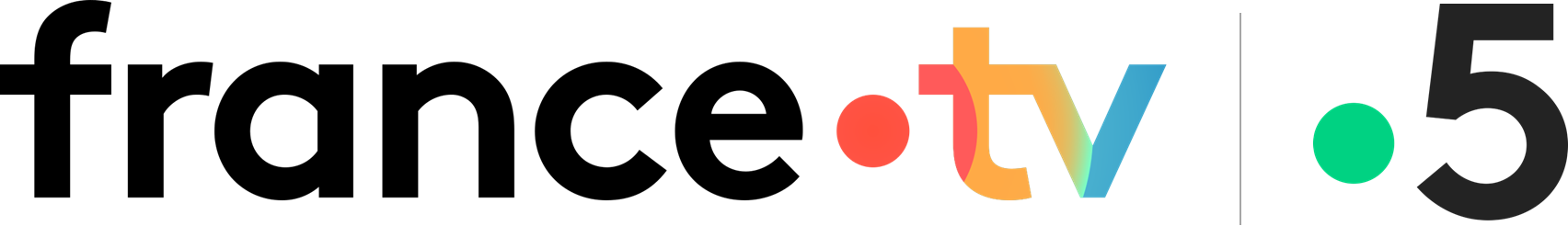
- Logo used subsequently since 6 June 2025
- Country: France
- Broadcast area: France, Andorra, and Monaco, reaching bordering regions via overspill of the French terrestrial network
- Headquarters: Paris, France

Programming
- Language: French
- Picture format: 1080i HDTV (downscaled to 16:9 576i for the SDTV feed)

Ownership
- Owner: France Télévisions
- Sister channels: France 2 France 3 France 4 France Info

History
- Launched: 13 December 1994; 31 years ago
- Founder: Claude Lemoine; Jean-Marie Cavada
- Replaced: La Cinq (1986–1992)
- Former names: La Cinquième (1994–2002)

Links
- Website: www.france.tv/france-5

Availability

Terrestrial
- TNT: Channel 5
- TNT in Overseas France: Channel 5 or 6 or 7

Streaming media
- FilmOn: Watch live

France 5 (French: [fʁɑ̃s sɛ̃k]) is a French free-to-air public television channel, part of the France Télévisions group. Principally featuring nonfiction and educational programming, the channel's motto is la chaîne de la connaissance et du savoir (the knowledge network).

In contrast to the group's two main channels, France 2 and France 3, France 5 concentrates almost exclusively on factual programming, documentaries, and discussions – 3,925 hours of documentaries were broadcast in 2003 – with fiction confined to one primetime slot of around two hours' duration on Monday evenings.

France 5 airs 24 hours a day. Earlier – before completion of the switchover to digital broadcasting on 29 November 2011 – the channel's analogue frequencies had carried the programmes of the Franco-German cultural channel Arte between 19.00 each evening and 3.00 the following morning.

== History ==
=== 1992–1994: Pre-launch operations ===
The history of the frequencies that are currently occupied by France 5 dates back to 20 November 1985, when Italian commercial television magnate Silvio Berlusconi and the Chargeurs Réunis group of Jérôme Seydoux and Christophe Riboud were granted an 18-year concession to operate the commercial television network La Cinq, which began operations on 20 February 1986. La Cinq operated at a financial loss throughout its first four years of its operations under Chargeurs Réunis and Robert Hersant. In October 1990, Hersant's share of the channel was sold to Hachette, a group that was led by Jean-Luc Lagardère and Yves Sabouret; both of them promised to save the network. Lagardère commissioned additional programmes for La Cinq instead of trying to reduce costs and make up for the deficit that it inherited, causing the channel's all-time debt to worsen to 3.5 billion francs.

On 3 January 1992, La Cinq was placed into legal redress due to Lagardère's continued inability to repay the channel's entire debt. Berlusconi and politician Charles Pasqua announced plans to rescue the channel later that month, but the plans were withdrawn on 24 March under pressure from the French government. The tribunal de commerce of Paris subsequently announced on 3 April that La Cinq would be shut down and its assets liquidated effective 12 April at midnight CET. La Cinq would shut down as planned on 12 April 1992 at midnight following a special final programme commemorating the channel's six-year history.

Following the closure of La Cinq, the Bérégovoy government announced on 23 April 1992 that the French feed of the Franco-German public television service Arte (which was formerly known as La Sept) would occupy a portion of the frequencies that were formerly occupied by La Cinq beginning on 28 September, with the 19:00 to 1:00 timeslot being reserved for the service. On 1 February 1994, the Balladur government created La Télévision du savoir, de la formation et de l'emploi, which planned to launch a public television service that would occupy the timeslot that was not used by Arte. Jean-Marie Cavada and Michel Serres presided over the organization's foundation. The service ran test broadcasts between 28 March and 17 April under the name Télé emploi (Teleworking), with programmes airing from 7:30 to 19:00. Following the conclusion of the test broadcasts, communications minister Nicolas Sarkozy created a groupement d'intérêt économique in October 1994 that would allow Arte and La Télévision du savoir, de la formation et de l'emploi, the latter of which would now be known as La Cinquième, to provide shared distribution of their programmes across France.

=== 1994–2000: La Cinquième launches ===
La Cinquième formally launched operations on 13 December 1994 at 18:00 CET with a special programme from the Louvre Museum in Paris that was attended by prime minister Édouard Balladur and 500 children from around France. The channel initially aired a mix of small educational programmes between 7:00 and 19:00 daily.

In November 1995, the channel began airing an expanded schedule for cable subscribers in the Paris area with programmes ending at midnight. Subscribers to the Canalsat and TPS satellite services began receiving the expanded schedule nationally in January 1998. La Cinquième was given permission to expand its cable and satellite schedule to 20 hours per day (7:00 to 3:00) in November 1999, with terrestrial transmissions still only permitted between 7:00 and 19:00.

=== 2000–present: Integration with France Télévisions and rebrand as France 5 ===
La Cinquième was integrated in the France Télévisions public holding in 2000, which gathered France 2 and France 3; it would be eventually rebranded as France 5 on 7 January 2002. On 31 March 2005, France 5 was expanded to a 24 hour schedule as part of the launch of the TNT digital broadcasting service; its timesharing arrangement with Arte was retained for analogue terrestrial broadcasts. France 5 further reduced its programming hours on analogue in June 2009 in preparation for the country's digital switchover, which took place on 30 November 2011.

== Logos ==
Logo from 16 October 1999 till 6 January 2002

Logo from 7 January 2002 till 7 April 2008

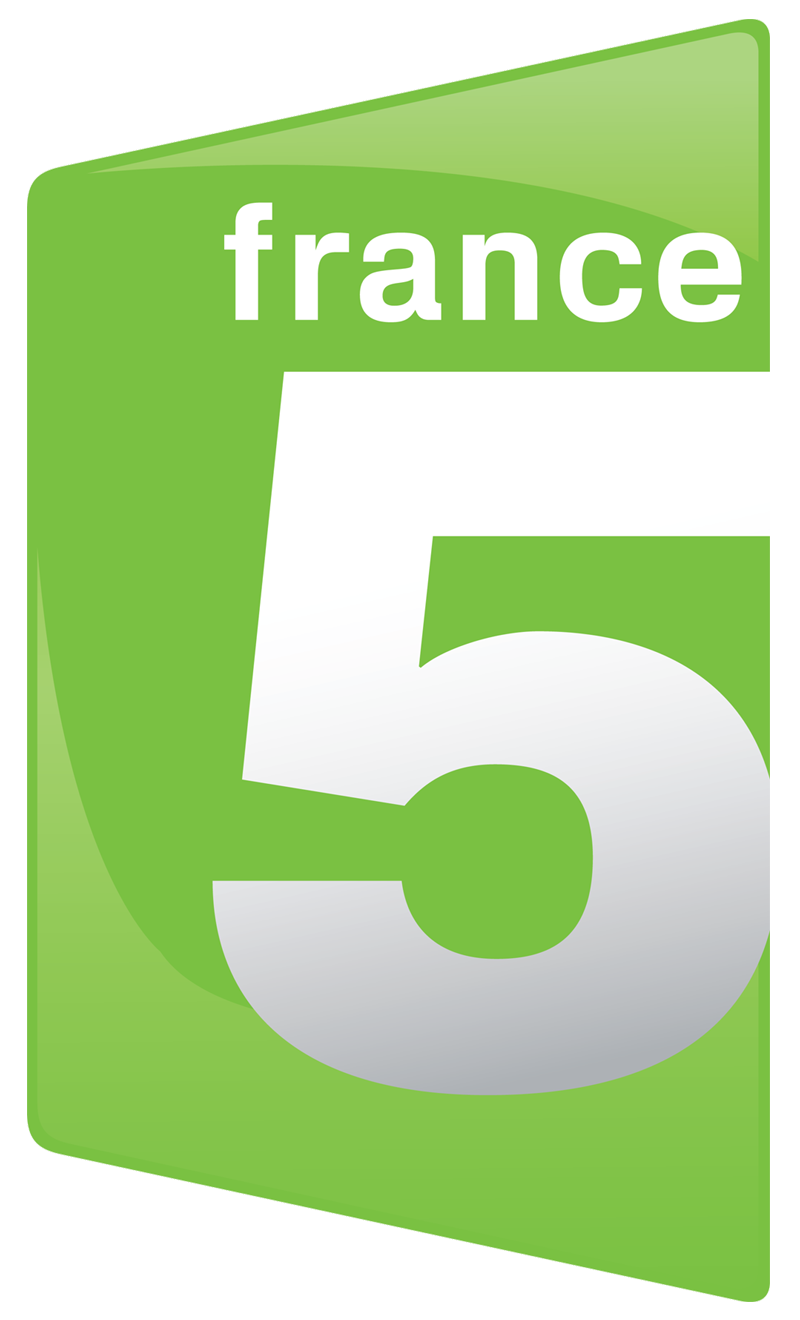
Logo from 7 April 2008 till 29 January 2018

France 5 HD logo, 2011–2018

Logo from 29 January 2018

On-screen logo from 29 January 2018

== Subsidiary ==
- La Cinquième Développement – former company, active from 1995 to 2001, wholly owned subsidiary of La Cinquième, responsible for managing telephone services, Minitel, Internet, Teletext, and market a selection of programs of the chain on all media. These services were taken over by France Télévisions subsidiaries at the end of 2000.

== See also ==
- France Télévisions
- List of documentary channels
