= France Médias Monde =

French state-owned media company

- Type: State-owned enterprise
- Industry: Mass media (state-owned)
- Founded: 4 April 2008 (as Audiovisuel extérieur de la France)
- Headquarters: Paris, France
- Area served: Worldwide
- Owner: Government of France
- Subsidiaries: France 24; Monte Carlo Doualiya; Radio France Internationale; TV5Monde (11.97%)
- Website: francemediasmonde.com

France Médias Monde (English: France Media World) is a French state-owned holding company which supervises and co-ordinates the activities of the major public media organizations broadcasting or publishing internationally from France.

The company's subsidiaries are the radio broadcasters Radio France Internationale (RFI) and Monte Carlo Doualiya (MCD), and the television news broadcaster France 24. The company also has a 11.97% stake in the general entertainment and news network TV5Monde.

== History ==
=== Beginnings as Société de l'audiovisuel extérieur de la France (2008–2013) ===
==== Birth of the idea as 'France Monde' ====
France Monde was the name of the initial project to house the various international branches of French external broadcasting under one roof, including Radio France International, France 24 and the French State's holdings in TV5Monde.

The shares that were in question were 100% of Radio France Internationale, 66.61% of TV5Monde (the remaining capital is held by the partner channels and some private investors) and 50% of France 24 (with the remainder held by TF1).

On 21 February 2008, it was announced the CEO of the network was appointed by French president Nicolas Sarkozy, as Alain de Pouzilhac, the former president of France 24, with Christine Ockrent, a journalist, serving as 'directrice générale déléguée' or 'Vice President'.

The appointment of Alain de Pouzilhac was met with strong hostility of the unions of the companies concerned. On Wednesday 17 September 2008, the director of France 24, Grégoire Deniau, quit his post and France 24's editor Bertrand Coq was made redundant. This inflamed the already tense atmosphere created over de Pouzilhac's role in the network.

==== Creation of the 'Société de l'audiovisuel extérieur de la France (SAEF)' ====
Logo of the SAEF

Once the idea had been solidified, it was renamed the 'Society of Exterior Audiovisual of France' (SAEF). The former French president Nicolas Sarkozy stated that the SAEF would serve as an alternative to the BBC, CNN or Al Jazeera. It was expected that the combined funding, plus additional advertising revenue, would total €400 million.

==== Revelations of power struggle between Ockrent and de Pouzilhac ====
At the end of 2010, the internal conflict between the two leaders de Pouzilhac and Ockrent broke out during an internal spying affair revealed by French newspaper Le Point. Christine Ockrent was therefore massively repudiated by the management teams at both SAEF and France 24. Two years later, de Pouzilhac tended his resignation on 12 July 2012. After the announcement, he was replaced by Marie-Christine Saragosse. After his resignation, Ockrent demanded €650,000 in severance payments, due to her being removed from vice-presidency as a result.

=== Rebirth as France Médias Monde ===
On 27 June 2013, AEF became France Médias Monde. With the rebrand, the holding company began to market itself explicitly for the first time, with new websites and branding created for all companies in the group, with 'A France Médias Monde channel' featured on France 24 press releases under its logo, and France Médias Monde links featured on each of its websites to emphasise the grouping of the different broadcasters.

The company was backed up by the signature of the first contract of objectives and means between the French State and the newly coined 'France Médias Monde' on 9 April 2014.

== See also ==
- InfoMigrants
- International broadcasting
- International news channels
- Television in France
