= M6+ =

French video on demand service

- Logo used since 14 May 2024
- Former names: M6 Replay (2008–2013); 6play (2013–2024)
- Website type: Video on demand, OTT streaming platform
- Available in: French
- Founded: 21 November 2007; 18 years ago
- Headquarters: Neuilly-sur-Seine, Hauts-de-Seine, Île-de-France, France
- Area served: France
- Owner: M6 Group
- Website: Official website
- Launched: 19 March 2008; 18 years ago (as M6 Replay); 4 November 2013; 13 years ago (M6 Replay becomes 6play); 14 May 2024; 2 years ago (6play becomes M6+)
- Current status: Active

M6+ (previously M6 Replay then 6play) is a French streaming and video-on-demand platform, launched by the M6 Group on 14 May 2024, succeeding 6play. The service allows live viewing of Free-to-Air channels: M6, W9, 6ter and Gulli. Along with Pay channels Paris Première and Téva through a subscription pay wall for each of the two channels (1,99€ (1.99 euros) per month for each channel) as well as some online channels financed by advertising and the French broadcast of National Football League and catch-up TV content from M6 Group.

The platform was originally launched as M6 Replay on 19 March 2008, then relaunched as 6play on 4 November 2013, before being relaunched again as M6+ on 14 May 2024.

== History ==
In 2007, M6 Group created M6 Replay platform (now M6+) and operated the platform as an online video content streaming service.

=== M6 Replay ===
On 19 March 2008, M6 launched a new catch-up TV service called M6 Replay, allowing French internet users (Metropolitan France only) to watch all M6 channel programs (excluding films) one hour after they are broadcast, free of charge.

Since July 2009, advertisements have been present at the beginning of these videos and during certain shows and series.

On 5 July 2012, Nicolas de Tavernost launched a new version of M6 Replay. This version allows the user to synchronize their device with the television via the sound emitted by the latter, to comment on the program live or to share it with the community on social networks.

=== 6play ===
In 2013, the M6 Group launched 6play. The website and app provide access to live broadcasts, catch-up programs, and the ability to react to live programs via social media.

On 27 March 2014, 6play launched four new free digital channels: Sixième Style, Comic, Crazy Kitchen and Stories.

In the same year, 6play became the leading catch-up TV service for under-50s. The Home Time and Bruce channels joined the list shortly afterwards.

In June 2016, 6play launched Refresh, a quirky channel surfing experience featuring channels from the M6 Group. In 2017, following the acquisition of the French radio stations of the RTL Group by M6, radio stations RTL2 and Fun Radio are joining the platform, offering replays of shows and live video streaming.

In 2017, 6play expanded its offering with the launch of its first original program, Les Reines du make-up (The Queens of Makeup).

Between 2019 and 2020, 6play launched 10 new original productions and acquired exclusive programs for its platform.

In December 2020, 6play acquired the rights to Cage Warriors, the European mixed martial arts organization. The platform offers fights for free in France.

Between 2020 and 2021, in collaboration with Bedrock, 6play launched a new version of its platform, which was gradually deployed via IPTV and OTT.

In September 2021, 6play produced an original fiction series for the first time: Season 2 of Black Gold. In 2021, 6play is also launching a film service offering around twenty feature films on demand and free of charge, and is expanding its series offering in its entirety, notably by offering a number of British series.

In 2022, the partnership between 6play and Vice Media Group aims to enrich the platform's catalog and make VICE programs available for free.

=== M6+ ===
The M6+ platform by M6 Group was launched on 14 May 2024 with 30,000 hours of programming, double that of 6play and its competitor TF1+ from TF1 Group. M6 Group promises 300 films and 11,000 hours of series from Disney, CBC, Sony, and Paramount. The new platform will combine the group's television and radio offerings with podcasts and other programs from RTL, RTL2, and Fun Radio. The group wants to offer more exclusive content on its platform such as special shows with internet celebrities or a quirky news program produced in partnership with Le Gorafi. M6 also announced new technical features such as an AI assistant to find the program that best suits you, with a new interface based on that of RTL+ in Germany.

M6 has announced a €100 million investment with the aim of tripling its streaming revenue within four years. The platform will offer a paid subscription, similar to TF1+, allowing viewers to watch programs without commercials. In September 2024, M6 Group announced a partnership with NBCUniversal to expand its streaming service, Hayu, into M6+. M6 Group, through its channel M6 and its free streaming platform M6+, were named as the official broadcaster of the FIFA World Cup for 2026 and 2030. The 2026 World Cup was held from 11 June to 19 July 2026 on M6 and M6+ in France.

On 14 January 2026, Amazon and the M6 group announced that they had signed an agreement for the addition of M6 group content to the Amazon Prime Video platform, in a contract similar to the one Amazon signed with France Télévisions, with the agreement taking effect immediately. Under the agreement, M6+ would allow users of Amazon Prime Video to access content from the M6 Group on the Prime Video service, such as its entertainment programs (Love is in the Meadow, Peking Express, Top Chef France, France's Got Talent, The Traitors France, Married at First Sight France, or The Great French Bake Off), the youth programming on its Gulli channel, documentaries and magazines (Restricted Area, Capital, Enquête Exclusive...), along with its news programs (at 12:45 and 19:45) and the podcasts from its radio stations RTL, RTL2 and Fun Radio.

=== 6play max / M6+ Max ===
In October 2022, 6play max was launched, a paid service considered an extended version of 6play. On 14 May 2024, the service was renamed M6+ Max upon the rebranding of 6play into M6+.

== Logos ==
When the service was 6play, the contained the number "6" followed by the word "play" right next to it as the logo. On 6 March 2024, when it was announced that a new platform called M6+ would replace 6play, this change is accompanied by a new visual identity for the platform. The current M6+ logo consists of the M6 channel logo accompanied by a plus sign.

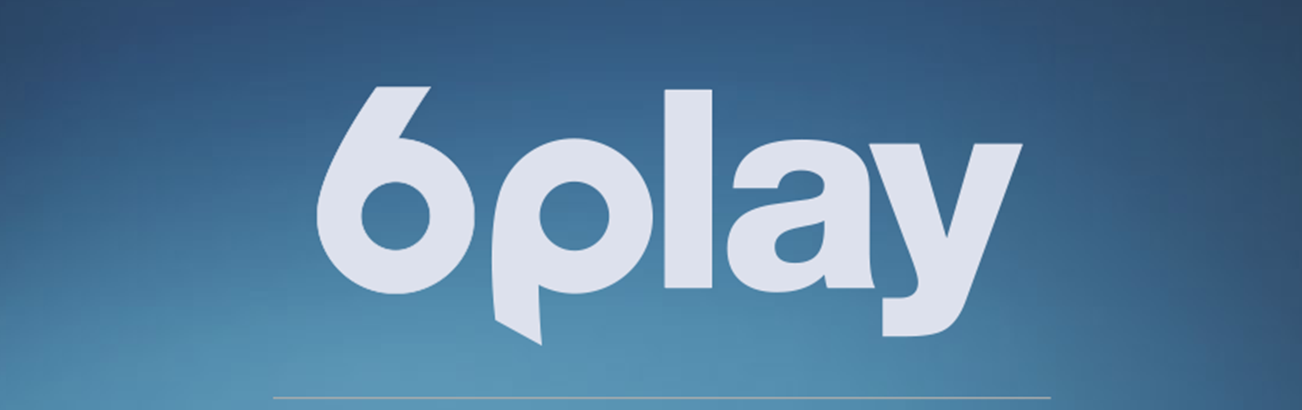
Logo of 6play from 4 November 2013 to 2020

Logo of 6play from 2020 to 14 May 2024

Logo of M6+ since 14 May 2024

== Channels ==
=== M6 Group channels ===
==== Free-to-Air channels ====
In addition to content on the m6.fr portal, the platform offers digital livestreams of the following free-to-air channels owned by M6 Group:

- M6
- W9
- 6ter
- Gulli

==== Pay-TV channels ====
With price of additional 1,99€ (1.99 euros) per month for each of the following channels, users can watch digital livestreams of the following pay-tv channels owned by M6 Group:

- Paris Première
- Téva

=== FAST channels ===
M6+ also has a list of FAST channels that are broadcast on the platform

==== Current ====
M6+'s current free ad-supported streaming television (FAST) channels are listed on its Web site. Channels include:

FAST Channel Name	About
The Marseillais 24/7 (Les Marseillais 24/24)	Episodes from the series.
Incredible Transformations 24/7 (Incroyable transformations 24/24)	Episodes from the series.
The Queens of Shopping 24/7 (Les Reines du Shopping 24/24)	Episodes from the series.
Criminal Investigations: The True Crime Magazine 24/7 (Enquêtes criminelles : le magazine des faits divers 24/24)	Episodes from the series.
Restricted Area 24/7 (Zone interdite 24/24)	Episodes from the series.
Turbo 24/7 (Turbo 24/24)	Episodes from the series.
Live by M6+ 24/7 (Le Live by M6+ 24/24)	Reruns of Live programs from M6 and M6+

==== Seasonal channels ====
Channel Name	About
Television films of Christmas 24/7 (Téléfilms de Noël 24/24)	Christmas films and TV films.
National Football League 24/7 (NFL 24/24)	Games from the NFL to be aired in France.

== Broadcasts, platforms and apps ==
In metropolitan France, M6+ is broadcast on its website and its application available on various platforms, and the service is also available with the TV packages of operators, via their set-top boxes and on the various platforms of the operators (such as MyCanal, Orange, Oqee, B.tv). M6+ is also compatible across: all Apple and Android devices along with Smart TVs and over-the-top (OTT) devices (Samsung, LG, Hisense, Philips, Android TV and Amazon Fire TV).

Outside of France, only certain replayable content is available.

== See also ==
- TF1+
- france.tv
- Canal+
- Video on demand
