= TiJi =

- Country: France
- Broadcast area: France; French-speaking Europe; CIS; French-speaking Africa; Lebanon; Overseas France; Haiti; Ukraine; Kazakhstan
- Headquarters: Neuilly-sur-Seine

Programming
- Languages: French; Russian; Kazakh (continuity and bumpers in Russian)
- Picture format: 1080i (16:9 HDTV)

Ownership
- Owner: Groupe M6
- Sister channels: Canal J Gulli; M6; W9; 6ter Paris Première; Téva; M6 Music

History
- Launched: 15 December 2000; 25 years ago
- Closed: 13 December 2023; 2 years ago (Belarus)

Links
- Website: www.tiji.fr

TiJi is a French preschool television channel for children aged three to six. It is owned by Groupe M6, the media broadcaster based in Neuilly-sur-Seine, France.

== History ==
Launched in 2000, TiJi was the first channel in France to specialize in programming for preschool-aged children. At launch, it broadcast between 5:30am and 9:00pm. As of June 2002, the channel was available to two million subscribers, surpassing the initial five-year goal of reaching 1.5 million subscribers.

A strong increase in the audience of the channel was noted between December 2002 to June 2003, when its share of the preschool audience increased by 60%, reaching 0.8% total share. From 2002 to 2003, in houses and apartments with cable or satellite television, 43% of children aged 4-10 began viewing Tiji.

In 2008, it extended its broadcast till midnight to make viewing easier for international viewers. The channel played a signoff bumper for French viewers at 9pm, followed by a notice for parents that the channel ended at midnight for international viewers. Programming would resume as normal until overall signing off at midnight.

A Russian feed was launched in 2009, airing all programming dubbed into Russian. On 31 January 2022 a Kazakh audio track was added for the Russian feed, airing most of the channel's programs with voice-overs for the audience in Kazakhstan.

In 2016, the channel started to join ISP offers ending its exclusivity with Canalsat, and was accompanied by the launch of the service MyJ in October on Bouygues Telecom and Orange which was a customisable channel offering Tiji and Canal J content based on the profile's age and tastes, it was subsequently abandoned in favour of Gulli Max, which is included in the same youth offers.

On 1 February 2019, M6 Group had entered negotiations with Lagardère Active to acquire their television division, including TiJi, Gulli and Canal J.

On 21 October 2019 the logo's cloud remained the same but small changes were added, with also a new look and a new sound jingle somewhat inspired by the current Canal J.

== Audience ==
As of March 2009, TiJi was in the top five of thematic channels in France, with the audience share of 0.6%. It was also the second most popular channel among children after Canal J, with the audience share of 4% among children aged four to ten.

== International channels ==
The channel is variously distributed in French, Russian, Ukrainian and Kazakh.

The French channel was also distributed in Portugal on NOS until 5 November 2020.

=== Current channels ===
Launch date	Country
15 December 2000	France
12 September 2009	Russia
23 May 2022	Kazakhstan
