= Canal J =

French television channel

- Country: France
- Headquarters: 89, avenue Charles de Gaulle; 92200 Neuilly-sur-Seine

Ownership
- Owner: M6 Group
- Sister channels: M6; W9; 6ter Gulli; Paris Première; Téva; TiJi; M6 Music; Série Club

History
- Launched: 23 December 1985; 40 years ago

Links
- Website: canalj.fr

Availability

Terrestrial
- StarTimes: Channel 365

Canal J (stylised as canal J, French pronunciation: [kanal ʒi]) is a French pay television channel dedicated to children's programming. It is aimed at children aged 7 to 12.

On 1 February 2019, M6 Group entered negotiations to acquire the television unit of Lagardère Active including Canal J. The sale was completed on 2 September 2019.

== History ==
Created on 23 December 1985 at the initiative of the French corporation Group Hachette, Canal J was first launched on the cable network of Cergy-Pontoise. It was then launched in Paris on 25 November 1986 and in Nice and Montpellier on 12 February 1987. The channel broadcast mostly cartoons for 3–13 year-old kids using video cassettes at the network's headend. At launch, its schedule consisted of a two-hour programming block that aired for five times to make a ten-hour schedule.

On 8 February 1988, Canal J started to be managed by a new company composed by Europe 1 Communication and three cable providers: Communication and Development, Lyonnaise Communications and Générale d'Images. As part of this new structure, Canal J was the first channel in 1988 to be available to all television providers for cable and community antenna through the Telecom 1C satellite system. Now that it was available everywhere in France, the channel increased its subscribers base from 50,000 to 100,000 subscribers. By late-1989, it had 160,000 subscribers and increased its share to 300.000 subscribers the following year.

On 13 April 1989, the channel rebranded for the first time, beginning to improve its schedule.

On 15 December 1990, the abandonment of the costly project of subscription-based terrestrial and satellite broadcasting from TDF1 (covering Paris and other 22 cities in France) allowed Canal J to launch an ambitious strategy of investment in original programming, during which it started to produce and co-produce programmes. The channel consolidated its position on cable television. This marks the start of the policy of production and co-production of programmes (with the broadcast of Cajou, Le Trésor des Templiers and Les Histoires du père Castor) On that same year, the channel increased its subscribers base from 330,000 to 550,000 customers.

On 14 November 1992, the launch of CanalSatellite analogique made Canal J available throughout all of France, as it was picked up by the provider as one of its seven channels offered to its customers. Canal J used to timeshare with Canal Jimmy, causing confusion. On 19 November, Les Bêtises by Henri Dès was the first song adapted as a cartoon to be aired on the channel.

On 4 September 1993, Canal J aired L'Île aux enfants, a syndication TV series for kids that was originally aired on ORTF's third colour channel (Now France 3) allowing the nostalgic audience from the 1970s to watch again the programme's characters Casimir and Léonard, attracting an older audience. Canal J also broadcast Spirou and other morning programmes, such as Ciné Fourax and Atomes crochus, in order to increase its audience base.

On 2 December 1995, the channel celebrated its tenth anniversary and reached its financial balance for the first time. Canal J was included in the digital package of CanalSatellite when it was launched in 1996, and its morning programmes started were picked up by Canal France International (CFI) on 4 February 1996 in a programming block of two hours filled with Canal J shows aimed at Africa, the Middle East and Asia.

On 8 February 1997, the channel launched its own website (canalj.net) which was awarded in Biarritz that year. The site was completely redesigned on 1 January 2001 to become the first editorial and community site among the youth-oriented channels for children in France. The channel celebrated its 15 anniversary on Christmas 2000 and with this success, it launched a spin-off network: TiJi, aimed at children under 7 years old. Canal J at the time was the only kids and teens channel available on all cable providers and CanalSatellite offers.

On 3 April 2001, Canal J premiered Titeuf in first broadcast. It also premieres Mémorix on 4 October 2003, its eighth TV show.

On 10 January 2003, Nicktoons was launched as programming block in France on Canal J.

Its application to broadcast on the pay-digital terrestrial television system in France was approved by the Superior Council of the Audiovisual on 13 September 2003. By that point, the channel surpassed 3.5 million subscribers.

By the time of the merger between satellite providers Canalsat and TPS, Canal J and TiJi started to be distributed by TPS in summer 2007.

On 27 August 2007, the channel changed its logo and increased its airtime to 24/7 broadcasting. In 2008, the channel launched the band KidToniK.

The costs of broadcasting on digital terrestrial television were too expensive to be funded by the low number of subscribers Canal J had on that platform; due to this, the channel gave up its slot on DTT on 30 April 2009.

On 17 January 2015, Canal J launched its own high-definition simulcast feed. In that same year, it celebrated its 30 anniversary and commemorated it by rebranding its graphical package. It also premiered brand new series like Thunderbirds Are Go, Sailor Moon Crystal and Looped.

On 11 April 2016, Bouygues Telecom and Lagardère Active signed an agreement that allowed Bouygues to carry Canal J and TiJi on its channels offer, ending the exclusivity deal Canalsat and Numéricable had on those channels.

On 25 April of that same year, Canal J released its first animated TV series made in Creole aimed at its audience at the French Antilles. Sonic Boom was the first cartoon to be dubbed in Creole and subtitled in French.

On 12 July of that same year, Lagardère Active reached a deal with Orange in order for the latter to carry TiJi and Canal J. The same was done with SFR ADSL.

On 2 September 2019, the television pole from Lagardère Active was acquired by M6 Group.

== N-Toons ==
N-Toons
- N-Toons logo used from around 2010 until July 31, 2015

Programming
- Picture format: 576i (SDTV); 1080i (HDTV)

Ownership
- Owner: Viacom

History
- Launched: January 10, 2003 (original); October 21, 2011 (2011 reboot)
- Closed: November 7, 2005 (Nicktoons, the block was subsequently reorganized into N-Toons); July 31, 2015 (2011 reboot)
- Replaced by: Nickelodeon

Links
- Website: www.nickelodeon.fr

Nicktoons (later known as N-Toons) was a block on the French network Canal J, which launched the Nickelodeon brand in France. In 2005 a separate network launched to carry Nickelodeon, and the Canal J block was rebranded as N-Toons. The block later returned the reboot, used from October 21, 2011 until July 31, 2015 on the French version of Nickelodeon Wallonia.
