= Show Me Your Voice =

French television game show

- Genre: Game show
- Based on: I Can See Your Voice by CJ ENM
- Directed by: Guillaume Charles; Renaud Rahard
- Presented by: Issa Doumbia; Élodie Gossuin (eps. 3–5)
- Country of origin: France
- Original language: French
- No. of episodes: 5

Production
- Producer: Florian Guiot
- Camera setup: Multi-camera
- Production company: Warner Bros. International Television Production

Original release
- Network: M6
- Release: 22 April 2021 – 15 July 2024
- Network: W9
- Release: 22 October 2025

Related
- I Can See Your Voice franchise

Show Me Your Voice is a French television mystery music game show based on the South Korean programme I Can See Your Voice, featuring its format where a guest artist and contestants attempt to eliminate bad singers from the group, until the last mystery singer remains for a duet performance. It first aired on M6 on 22 April 2021.

== Gameplay ==
=== Format ===
Over the course of several rounds, the guest artist and a pair of contestants must attempt to eliminate bad singers from a group of nine "mystery singers", identified only by their occupation or alias, without ever hearing them perform live. They are assisted by clues regarding the singers' backgrounds, style of performance, and observations from a celebrity panel. At the end of a game, the last remaining mystery singer is revealed as either good or bad by means of a duet between them and one of the guest artists. (Note: Gameplay notes: The number of rounds are set to five (from eps. 1–2) or six (from eps. 3–5).; The number of batches in Playback round are set to three groups of trios (from eps. 1–2) or two groups of quartets (from eps. 3–5).; From eps. 3–5, the contestants having the most bad singer eliminations get a designated cash prize from a minimum of €1,000 to a maximum of €10,000 (with at least six bad singers).)

The contestants must eliminate one mystery singer at the end of each round, receiving a designated cash value based on the number of bad singer eliminations. At the end of a game, if the contestants decide to walk away, they will keep the money had won in previous rounds; if they decide to risk for the last remaining mystery singer, they win €20,000 if a singer is good, or lose their all winnings if a singer is bad.

=== Rounds ===
1. First impression (French: Première impression) (eps. 3–5)
  The guest artist and contestants are given some time to observe and examine each mystery singer based on their appearance.
2. Playback (French: Relecture) (eps. 1–5)
  Nine mystery singers are divided into batches, and each of them would have to perform lip sync individually.
3. Exhibit (French: Pièce à conviction) (eps. 1–5)
  The guest artist and contestants are presented with a video package containing possible clues by one of the mystery singers of their choice.
4. Acting (French: La performance) (eps. 1–2)
  The guest artist and contestants must describe one of the mystery singer's other talents, except "singing" itself. This may not be related to the "stage of truth", but depends on their identity.
5. Concealed vocals (French: Cachez la voix) (eps. 1–5)
  The mystery singer lip syncs to the good singer's recording, then a bad singer's recording comes in the middle of the performance.
6. Secret studio (French: Studio secret) (eps. 3–5)
  The guest artist and contestants are presented with video from a recording session by one of the mystery singers, but pitch-shifted to obscure their actual vocals.
7. Interview (French: L'interview) (eps. 1–5)
  The guest artist and contestants may ask questions to the remaining mystery singers. Good singers are required to give truthful responses, while the bad singers must lie.

== Production ==
According to a report from Toute la Télé in September 2015, plans for the first adaptation of I Can See Your Voice outside Asia began, when Shine France had initially made interest to produce and localise the South Korean game show. After a six-year hiatus, Groupe M6 formally acquired the rights in March 2021, with Warner Bros. International Television Production assigning on production duties.

== Episodes ==
Despite having formally promoted from first to third season, Show Me Your Voice commenced airing on occasional "test runs" instead, starting with a pair of pilot episodes on M6 on 22 April and 13 May 2021. At the time of production during the COVID-19 pandemic, health and safety protocols had also implemented. In April 2024, journalist Clément Garin announced in a tweet that the programme would resume after a three-year hiatus, with filming taking place at Studio 128 in Saint-Denis, Paris, and began airing the next two episodes on 8 and 15 July 2024. One year later, the programme made its move to M6's sister channel W9, when it aired a single episode on 3 October 2025. (Note: "Test run" episodes from 3 to 6 were also released on its streaming service M6+.)

=== Guest artists ===
Legend:
Good singer
Bad singer
— The contestants chose to risk the money.
— The contestants chose to walk away with the money.

Episode		Guest artist (Note: Players' notes: For the returning guest artists (who also include foreigners and former good singers), names are displayed in italics.; For the mixed groups, names who identified as bad singers are displayed in italics.)	Contestants	Mystery singers (In their respective numbers and aliases)								
#	Date	Guest artist	Contestants	Elimination order								Winner
1	22 April 2021	Claudio Capéo	Sarah and Jenna → €20,000	3. Maysha; (Queen of Soul)	5. Anthony Perret; (RTW Seller)	8. Svenn Moretti-Golay; (Drag Queen)	1. Pauline Nyrls; (English Teacher)	4. Myck Le Yondre; (Waiter)	9. Ronald Calabuig; (Practical Nurse)	7. Hélène Rossi; ('Ori Tahiti Dancer)	2. Davy Cioli; (Railwayman)	6. Jean-Pierre Virgil; Coachbuilder
2	13 May 2021	Chimène Badi	? → €20,000	3. Quentin Gendrot; (Hard Rock Fan)	4. Fabien Cicoletta; (Wedding Planner)	9. Charlie Brown; (Steward)	6. Caterina Roberti; (Piano Teacher)	2. Andréa and Géraldine Tshibuabua; (High School Girls)	5. Chloé Touzet; (Cheerleader)	8. Julie Jourdan; (Dietitian)	7. Sarah Lugassy; (Cashier)	1. Myssia Marie; Legal Assistant
3	8 July 2024	Joyce Jonathan	Amandine Perez and Alexandre Collin → €20,000	2. (Judoka)	5. (Student)	8. (Meilleur Ouvrier de France)	9. Chloé Villard; (Cowgirl)	6. (Capoeira Dancer)	3. Félicie and Joséphine Hochedé; (Skiing Twins)	1. Kévin Martin; (Barber)	7. (Motorcycle Rider)	4. Laura Bertaina; Firefighting Nurse
4	15 July 2024	Hélène Ségara	Jason and Kenzo Gargowitch → €20,000	8. (Animator)	9. Fanny Egéa; (Mermaid)	7. (Punk)	4. (Footballer)	6. (Painter)	3. (Policeman)	2. (Cavalier)	1. (Formula One Driver)	5. Maacs; Scientist
5	22 October 2025	Sheryfa Luna	?	4. Arnaud Masclet; (Tennis Player)	{{|1. (Drag Queen)}}	{{|2. (Fencer)}}	{{|3. (Animal Caretaker)}}	{{|5. (Waitress)}}	{{|6. ()}}	{{|7. ()}}	{{|8. ()}}	{{|9. ()}}
6	TBA	Anne Sila	?	{{|1. ()}}	{{|2. ()}}	{{|3. ()}}	{{|4. ()}}	{{|5. ()}}	{{|6. ()}}	{{|7. ()}}	{{|8. ()}}	{{|9. ()}}

=== Panelists ===
Legend:
Guest panelist
Upcoming panelist

Apps		Panelists in attendance (Sorted by first appearance, with episode designations)
g#	p#	Panelists in attendance (Sorted by first appearance, with episode designations)
2	3	Éric Antoine and Hélène Segara (1–2); Philippe Lellouche (Note: Panelists' note: Foreign attendees: Natasha St-Pier (CAN); Anggun (IDN); Philippe Lellouche (ISR), and Booder (MAR)) (1, 3)
1	8	Élodie Frégé (1); Booder and Élodie Gossuin (2); Anne-Sophie Girard and Florent Peyre (3); Michèle Bernier, Roman Doduik, and Natasha St-Pier (4)
TBA	3	Emma Daumas, Emmanuel Moire, and Anggun

== Reception ==
Legend:
Highest rated episode
Lowest rated episode

No.	Title	Air date	Timeslot (CET)	Viewership		Share		Ref(s)
No.	Title	Air date	Timeslot (CET)	Rank	Total	Cons.	Grp. u50	Ref(s)
1	"Claudio Capéo"	22 April 2021	Thursday, 21:05	3	2.206	10%	20.5%	
2	"Chimène Badi"	13 May 2021	Thursday, 21:05	4	1.364	5.9%	10.6%	
3	"Joyce Jonathan"	8 July 2024	Monday, 21:10	6	0.802	4.2%	8.4%	
4	"Hélène Ségara"	15 July 2024	Monday, 21:10	5	0.952	6%	11.7%	(Note: In the 4th episode on 15 July 2024, average viewing population and (both overall and u-50) shares were combined from two parts — with the 1st part garnering 941,000, 5.2% and 11.1%, and the 2nd have 963,000, 6.8% and 12.3%.)
5	"Sheryfa Luna"	22 October 2025	Wednesday, 21:25	15	0.262	1.4%	NR	
6	"Anne Sila"	Pending						

Source: Médiamétrie
