= Pierre-Luc =

Pierre-Luc is a given name. Notable people with the name include:

- Pierre-Luc Brillant (born 1978), Canadian actor and musician
- Pierre-Luc Caron (born 1993), professional Canadian football long snapper
- Pierre-Luc-Charles Cicéri (1782–1868), leading French set designer
- Pierre-Luc Dubois (born 1998), Canadian professional ice hockey centre
- Pierre-Luc Dusseault (born 1991), Canadian politician, Member of Parliament
- Pierre-Luc Gagnon, aka PLG (born 1980), Canadian professional skateboarder
- Pierre-Luc Labbé (born 1984), former professional Canadian football linebacker
- Pierre-Luc Laforest aka Pete Laforest (born 1978), Canadian former professional baseball catcher
- Pierre-Luc Létourneau-Leblond (born 1985), Canadian former professional ice hockey left winger
- Pierre-Luc Périchon (born 1987), French professional road and track bicycle racer
- Pierre-Luc Poulin (born 1995), Canadian sprint kayaker
- Pierre-Luc Séguillon (1940–2010), French columnist and journalist
- Pierre-Luc Sleigher (born 1982), Canadian professional ice hockey player
- Pierre-Luc Thériault (born 1993), Canadian table tennis player
- Pierre-Luc Yao (born 1982), former professional Canadian football running back
