= Gulli =

French free-to-air television channel

- Country: France
- Broadcast area: France; Belgium; Switzerland
- Headquarters: 89, avenue Charles de Gaulle; 92575 Neuilly-sur-Seine

Programming
- Picture format: 1080i HDTV

Ownership
- Owner: Groupe M6
- Sister channels: M6; W9; 6ter; Paris Première; Téva; Canal J; TiJi; MCM Top; M6 Music; Série Club

History
- Launched: 18 November 2005; 20 years ago

Links
- Website: gulli.fr (Website in French) gulli.ru (Website in Russian) m6.fr/gulli (M6+ website) replay.gulli.fr (Gulli Replay website) svod.gulli.fr (Gulli Max website)

Availability

Terrestrial
- TNT: Channel 12

Gulli (pronounced [ɡyli]; stylised as gulli) is a French free-to-air television channel focused on kids and family programming. It was created as a result of a partnership between Lagardère Active and state-owned broadcaster France Télévisions. In 2019, Groupe M6 bought Gulli as well as the television division of Lagardère Active.

== History ==
Gulli was created as a result of a partnership between a kids-television pioneer Lagardère Active and the public service France Télévisions. The former is known due to its children's channel, Canal J, while the latter has a long history investing in kids programming through its youth-oriented division on its generalist networks.

The channel was launched on 18 November 2005 on the digital terrestrial television platform in France. On 1 July 2015, Gulli launched its own HD simulcast feed on the Astra 1 satellite as part of Canalsat's complete transition to HD. On 5 April 2016, its HD feed was launched on DTT.

In 2011, the first Gulli indoor playground opened. Developed since 2009 and operated by La Boîte aux Enfants, the number of Gulli Parcs rose to 15 in October 2024.

On 23 December 2013, a deal was reached between Lagardère and France Télévisions to purchase the latter's shares in Gulli. Until then, the two groups were bound by a shareholders' agreement with a non-competition clause, which made it impossible for France Télévisions to create a public youth channel, as the Minister of Culture Aurélie Filippetti had hoped. By exiting Gulli, France Télévisions was able to create its own children's channel on France 4. As part of the negotiations for the purchase of the public service's 34% stake in Gulli, the total volume of advertising was capped in the children's programming slots on France 4 during 3 years so as not to compete in advertising with Gulli. The deal was finalised on 29 October 2014 with the transfer of 34% of France Télévisions's shares to Lagardère for €25 million.

La Grande enquête des marques préférées des familles 2018 designated Gulli as the favorite channel for parents regarding programming aimed at kids. CSA revealed in its annual reports that Gulli was one of the three national private free-to-air channels that, in 2016, was seen as profitable, behind TF1 and M6. Most private channels, however, were in the red, largely due to the growth in offer in 2012.

In 2019, Lagardère Active sold its television division to Groupe M6 in a €215 million deal, effective from 2 September.

On 3 January 2022, the new time-slot brand Gulli Prime was launched for evenings, targeting all family with a focus on adults. It was a move to revitalize Gulli despite its declining audience due to the lowering consumption of linear TV among children, to consolidate its value as the channel was considered to be sold as part of the planned merger of Groupe M6 with Groupe TF1 initiated in September 2021. As Gulli is the only consistently profitable digital channel, M6 was hoping to sell it at a good price along with Tiji and Canal J. In February, it was decided not to sell Gulli but 6ter (along with TFX), and the sale was even signed in April to Altice Média in the event of the merger being completed, which was cancelled in September due to the concessions demanded by the Competition Authority, in particular the sale of the TF1 or M6 channel. Bertelsmann then considered selling Groupe M6 for a few weeks but the timing was too tight before M6's frequency renewal.

The channel was launched in Brazil on 9 August 2020, on the newly established satellite TV provider BluTV, which went bankrupt by 2022, and the channel went inactive in 2023.

In 2024, Gulli candidated for the decennial renewal of its terrestrial license, which was on the verge of ending in 2025. The channel was auditioned on 8 July 2024 by Arcom. As part of the non-renewal of the terrestrial license from two channels, Arcom wanted to change the numbering in order to regroup channels coherently, considering a block of kids channels. As announced on 13 January 2025, its initial slot (channel 18) got reassigned to T18, while the channel moved to a higher slot, channel 12, on 6 June 2025, vacated following the closure of NRJ 12.

== GulliMax ==
In June 2014, Gulli launched subscription video service GulliMax.

== Branding ==
At the French media regulator CSA's hearings for the new DTT channels, the channel was presented under the name of Gulliver, named after Jonathan Swift's character from Gulliver's Travels, before being renamed and shortened to Gulli.

Gulli launched on 18 November 2005, with their first branding and logo designed by Dream On.

On 8 April 2010, Gulli decided to use a new on-the-air branding designed by Gédéon. The same day, the logo has changed, becoming darker and 3D. They also switched to widescreen in a somewhat dynamic way, with both the 4:3 and 16:9 aspect ratios.

In September 2013, Gulli introduced a new branding, again designed by Gédéon.

On 28 August 2017, Gulli changed its branding again and introduced a new logo. This time, their branding was designed by 17MARS. The 2017 branding received very positive reviews and gave a lot of color to the channel.

On 4 September 2023, Gulli changes its branding once again and introduced a new logo. This new branding was designed by Gédéon, who also did the 2010 and 2013 brandings.

=== Logos ===
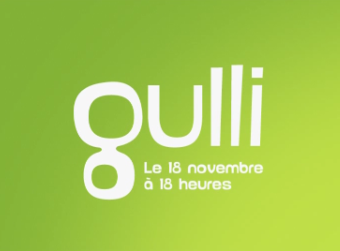
Original logo used from 18 November 2005 to 28 August 2017.

Second logo from 28 August 2017 to 4 September 2023.

Current logo since 4 September 2023.

=== Logos of derived channels ===
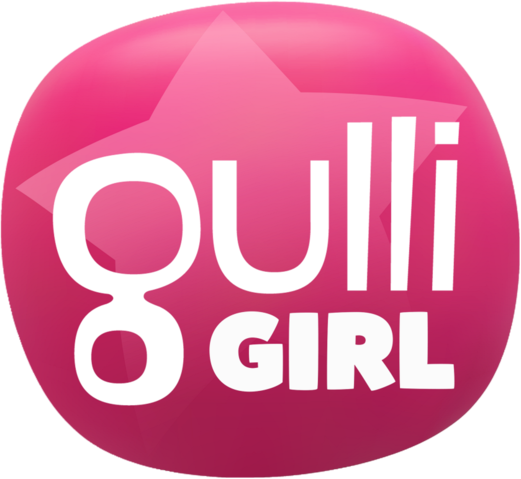
New logo of Gulli Girl since 2018

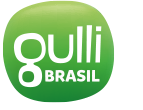
Logo of Gulli Brasil since 2020

== Programming ==
Gulli broadcasts cartoons, series, shows, and films.

=== Current programming ===
==== Live-action (Gulli Prime) ====
- Divina, está en tu corazón (replay exclusive)
- Malcolm in the Middle

==== Animated ====
- 100% Wolf
- All Hail King Julien
- Alvinnn!!! and the Chipmunks
- The Amazing World of Gumball (also on Cartoon Network)
- Animal Crackers
- Bande de sportifs !
- Barbie Dreamhouse Adventures
- Barbie: It Takes Two
- Baskup - Tony Parker
- Ben 10
- Beyblade Burst
- BFF by Cry Baby
- Bionic Max
- Blaze and the Monster Machines
- Bloopies
- Boy Girl Dog Cat Mouse Cheese
- Care Bears: Unlock the Magic
- The Casagrandes (also on Nickelodeon)
- Dino Ranch
- Enchantimals
- The Fairly OddParents
- Gabby's Dollhouse
- The Garfield Show
- Get Blake!
- Hotel Transylvania: The Series
- Hubert & Takako
- Il était une fois... notre Terre
- Jamie's Got Tentacles!
- Jurassic World Camp Cretaceous
- Katuri
- Kindi Kids
- Kingdom Force
- Kiva Can Do!
- Kung Fu Panda: The Paws of Destiny
- Legends of Spark
- The Loud House (also on Nickelodeon)
- Manger bouger dormir
- Milo (replay exclusive)
- Monster Buster Club
- My Little Pony: Pony Life
- The Minimighty Kids
- Monster High
- Ninja Express
- Octonauts
- Oggy and the Cockroaches
- Oggy and the Cockroaches: Next Generation
- Oswaldo
- The Adventures of Paddington (2019)
- The Penguins of Madagascar
- Petronix
- Pokémon
- Polly Pocket
- Ratz
- Ricky Zoom
- Robocar Poli
- Rugrats (2021)
- SheZow
- Les Sisters
- Sonic Boom
- Spidey and His Amazing Friends
- Taffy
- Tara Duncan (2021)
- The Adventure of Tintin
- Totally Spies!
- Transformers: EarthSpark
- Underdog and the Canine Defenders
- VIP Pets
- Watch My Chops!
- Wild Katz
- Zig & Sharko

==== Reality programming ====
- BattleBots
- C'est bon signe
- E=M6 Family
- Frogger: le jeu vidéo grandeur nature
- La grande vidéo party
- Le Geste Ecolo de Gulli
- Le Meilleur Pâtissier
- Lego Masters (France)
- Mes tubes en signes
- Mission Gulliverse
- Parents, un jeu d'enfant
- Tahiti Quest
- Too Cute
- Tout le monde...
- Wazup (magazine)

=== Programming blocks ===
==== Current ====
- Gulli Good: The most watched shows as well as new shows. Airing at 4:30 pm on weekdays (5:15 pm until 2012). Until September 2009, the block was also aired on weekends, at the same hours as weekdays. Shows that aired in this block include Pokémon, Power Rangers, and The Loud House. (Since 2 September 2006)
- Gulli Up: broadcast in the morning at 6:30 a.m., contains programs for children (since 4 September 2023).
- Gulli Midi: Broadcast every day at 11:45 a.m. (since 4 September 2023).
- Gulliwood: Cinema block that aired movies. Aired on Fridays nights at 7 pm (Since 28 August 2017)
- Gulli Prime: prime-time slot with programs for families with a focus on adults. Shows that aired in this block include The Thundermans, Mr. Bean, Tiny House Nation, sitcoms and movies. Daily from 9:05 pm to 1:45 am (since 3 January 2022).

==== Former ====
- Boing: Block that aired Cartoon Network shows. Cartoons that aired in this block include Dexter's Laboratory, Foster's: House of imaginary Friends, Hero: 108 and Codename: Kids Next Door. This block was created in parallel of the launch of the Boing channel. (3 April 2010 to March 2012)
- Code Aventure: Action oriented block that aired shows like Pokémon. replaced by Gulli Go (from 19 November 2005 until 28 August 2017. Redesigned twice, once in 2006, the other in 2011).
- Girl Power: Programming series for girls. Aired on Wednesdays and weekends at 1:15 pm (until 28 August 2017).
- Gros Cartoon: Programming dedicated to the most popular (comedic) cartoons. Broadcast with Ratz, Rudolf, La Famille Pirate and Les Zinzins de l'Espace, as well as many others. Discontinued on 26 August 2012.
- GRRR!!!/Grrr...: Programming dedicated to animals (Oggy and the Cockroaches, Ralf the Record Rat, Animaliens, Trop fort l'Animal and Woody Woodpecker). Aired in the morning (as Grrr... at 6:35 am, stopped in 2009) and the afternoon (at 4:35 pm, stopped on 27 August 2012). The predominant color was blue in the morning and the predominant color in the afternoon was orange.
- Gulli Bang: Aired every Wednesday at 8:25 am and 4:25 pm, Saturday at 1:40 pm and Sunday at 8:25 am between 2012 and 2013. (Pet Alien, Pokémon)
- Gulli Bonus: This block was the interstitials block. Aired in multiple parts of the day (most notably 20h00 and 10h45). From 2007 to 2021.
- Gulli d'or: A program broadcast on the channel's first anniversary on 18 November 2006. Broadcast Oggy and the Cockroaches, Grand Galop and more.
- Gulli Gang: Broadcast every day around 4:30 pm (stopped in September 2006) a comedy-action block, aired Oggy and the Cockroaches, Lil' Elvis Jones and the Truckstoppers and Mot. Replaced by Gulli Good on 2 September 2006.
- Gulli Land: Cartoon programming about fantasy. Stopped in September 2008.
- Gulli Gulli: Broadcast in the morning after at 6:45 am (stopped in July 2006 and replaced by Grrr...). Aired shows like Donkey Kong, Mot, and Lil' Elvis Jones and the Truckstoppers. It returned in 2007 as part of the "rentrée" at 20h45, airing shows like Oggy and the Cockroaches, Mr. Bean and Intervilles Juniors.
- Home Cinéma: Broadcast in 2008 and stopped in 2010.
- La météo de Gulli: Starred a monkey named Toobo who gives a forecast and dressing info. Stopped in the "rentrée" of 2013.
- Raid Dingues d'Oggy: Aired Saturday nights from 2006 to 2008, to broadcast marathons of Oggy and the Cockroaches.
- La labo de Gulli: Aired Monday to Friday from 2 pm to 4 pm during the summer of 2007.
- Méchamment Drôle: Comedy cartoon programming. Aired on weekends at 5 pm. Aired Zig & Sharko, Corneil & Bernie, A Kind of Magic, Oggy et les cafards and many more.
- Sitcomédies: Sitcom programming. Aired Monday to Friday at 12 pm (disappeared in 2007 and replaced by In ze boîte)
- Télé Grenadine: Cartoon programming of the 1970s and 80s. On Thursday evenings (formerly Tuesday evenings from 2007 to September 2009) (Stopped in 2011). Aired Les Shadoks, Lucky Luke, and Calimero.
- Toon Party: The programs in this block are Lucky Luke, Woody Woodpecker, Pink Panther, Les Zinzins de l'Espace, Les Ratz etc. This event block was broadcast on New Year's Eve 2009 and in the summer 2012, Christmas 2012, and April 2013.
- Podium Gulli: Cartoon marathon that viewers could vote on gullitv.fr for broadcast on Saturday afternoon. From 2 September 2006 to 2 September 2009.
- Gulli Goal: A cartoon block while waiting for the World Cup. Broadcast every Saturday at 4 p.m. from 2 June 2018, and stopped on 10 July 2018, of the same year after France's victory.
- Gulli Club: Film programming. Every Tuesday at 8:55 p.m. starting 12 February 2019 and discontinued the following spring 2019 after the channel began showing movies almost every night.
- Gulli Gold: A programming block of the Yu-Gi-Oh! (from 7 November to 29 November 2020)
- Gulli Toon: Comedy-oriented cartoons. Aired on weekdays at 7 am and 12 pm and also weekends at 5 pm. Shows that aired in this block include Oggy and the Cockroaches and Zig & Sharko. (from 28 August 2017 to 4 September 2023)
- Gulli Pop: Girl oriented cartoons. Aired weekends at 1:30 pm. Shows that aired in this block include My Little Pony, Barbie, The Thundermans, Lego Friends, The Powerpuff Girls and Totally Spies. (stopped in 2021)
- Gulli Go: Action-oriented cartoons. Aired weekends at 3 pm. Shows that aired in that block include Pokémon, Power Rangers, Transformers, and Beyblade Burst. (broadcast from 2 September 2017 to 4 December 2021)
- Gulli Doo: Preschool block with cartoons for little children. A former show in this block was Zig & Sharko. Airing weekdays morning at 8:30 am and at 12 pm. (from 8 April 2010 to 4 September 2023, replaced by Gulli Up)
- PaKataK: Easter celebration block, broadcast in 2006.

== Broadcast hours ==
When the channel launched on 18 November 2005, Gulli was initially broadcast from 6:30 am to 11:30 pm. Starting on 10 December 2007 (about three months after the "rentrée" of 2007) until 31 August 2008, the channel broadcasts from 6:00 am to 12:30 am. The channel has been broadcasting 24 hours a day since 1 September 2008.

== International versions ==
The network has been exported in dedicated versions for Russia, Africa, the MENA region, and Brazil, broadcasting in Russian, French, Arabic and previously Brazilian Portuguese. The brand itself was sold alongside the rest of the Lagadère channels to Groupe M6 in 2019. The Russian feed was renamed "Gulli Girl" in 2016 and broadcasts series aimed at a young female audience.

- Gulli Africa
- Gulli Bil Arabi
- Gulli Brasil (2020–2023)
- Gulli Girl (formerly Gulli Russia)
