= Danois =

Danois is a surname. Notable people with the surname include:

- Édouard Le Danois (1887–1968), French zoologist
- Jacques Danois (1927–2008), pseudonym of Jacques Maricq, Belgian reporter and writer
- Johanna Danois (born 1987), French sprinter
- Maeva Danois (born 1993), French runner
- Yseult Le Danois (1920–1985), French zoologist
