= Le Grand Jury =

Le Grand Jury (The Great Jury) is a French political broadcast of RTL, the main generalist radio network in France. Since 1994, it is also broadcast on LCI, a TV news channel.

It takes place in the evening on Sundays from 12:00 to 1:00pm (UTC+2). The usually invites a politician, an employer or a tade unionist to be interviewed by journalists of RTL, LCI and of a newspaper. The partner of the broadcast was Le Monde and has been Le Figaro since 2005.

Currently, the interviewers are Jean-Michel Aphatie (RTL), Pierre-Luc Séguillon (LCI) and Etienne Mougeotte (Le Figaro).

== History ==
In 1987, while being interviewed in Le Grand Jury, the National Front leader Jean-Marie Le Pen stated "the holocaust is a detail of the history of the Second World War".

In 2002, the Workers' Struggle spokesperson Arlette Laguiller cried during the broadcast when a former Trotskyist militant was evoked by the journalists.
