= Kidtonik =

- Origin: France
- Genres: Pop
- Years active: 2008–2011
- Label: Heben Music

Kidtonik (also stylized as KidToniK) was a French singing group formed of six members in 2008 by the French children's television channel Canal J.

== History ==
The members of the group were chosen by viewers of the French children's television channel Canal J during its 2008 TV season. After that, the group was signed to the label Heben Music. In July 2008, it released a single titled "Aller plus loin". It was placed very high in the French charts and continued to sell well during that year's summer season.

In October, the group was again in the top 10 in France with the single "Left & Right" (number 6), and then it released its first album, Aller plus loin, followed by another single from the album — "Jusqu'au bout", which entered the French charts in December and spent three weeks in the top 10 in January.

== Members ==
- Morgane Goffard
- Alexis Durand
- Joanna Miles
- Oihana Lob
- Sarah Michelle
- Robin Livin

== Discography ==
=== Albums ===
| Year | Title | Charts | |
| Year | Title | FR | FR DL |
|---|---|---|---|
| 2008 | Aller plus loin | 50 | 59 |
| 2010 | No Limit | 128 | 154 |

=== Singles ===
| Year | Title | Charts | Album |
| Year | Title | FR | Album |
|---|---|---|---|
| 2008 | "Aller plus loin" | 4 | Aller plus loin |
| 2008 | "Left & Right" | 6 | Aller plus loin |
| 2008 | "Jusqu'au bout" | 7 | Aller plus loin |
| 2009 | "Le mégamix" | 11 | — |
| 2010 | "Traverser la nuit" | 21 | No Limit |
| 2010 | "Hey" | 23 | No Limit |
