= RTL (French radio) =

- Paris; France
- Broadcast area: France; Luxembourg; Belgium; Elsewhere in Europe and North Africa (on LW and Satellite)
- Frequencies: FM: 104.3 MHz (Paris); 101.4 MHz (Marseille); 105.0 MHz (Lyon); Full list of frequencies on FM in other areas

Programming
- Language: French
- Format: News/talk

Ownership
- Owner: Groupe M6 (RTL Group)
- Sister stations: RTL2; Fun Radio

History
- First air date: 15 March 1933; 93 years ago
- Former call signs: Radio Luxembourg (1933–1966)
- Former frequencies: 236 kHz; 234 kHz (until 2023)

Links
- Website: rtl.fr

RTL (French: Radio Télévision Luxembourg) is a French commercial radio network owned by the RTL Group through Groupe M6. Founded in 1933 as Radio Luxembourg, it broadcast from outside of France until 1981 because only public stations had been allowed until then. It is a general-interest, news, talk and music station, broadcasting nationally ("category E" as classified by the CSA) in France, Francophone Belgium, and Luxembourg. Until 2022, RTL was also broadcast on long wave frequency 234 kHz from Beidweiler which could be picked up in large parts of the continent. It has a sister station called Bel RTL tailored for the French Community of Belgium. As of 2018, RTL is France's most popular radio station with an average of 6.4 million daily listeners that year.

== History ==
=== Radio Luxembourg ===
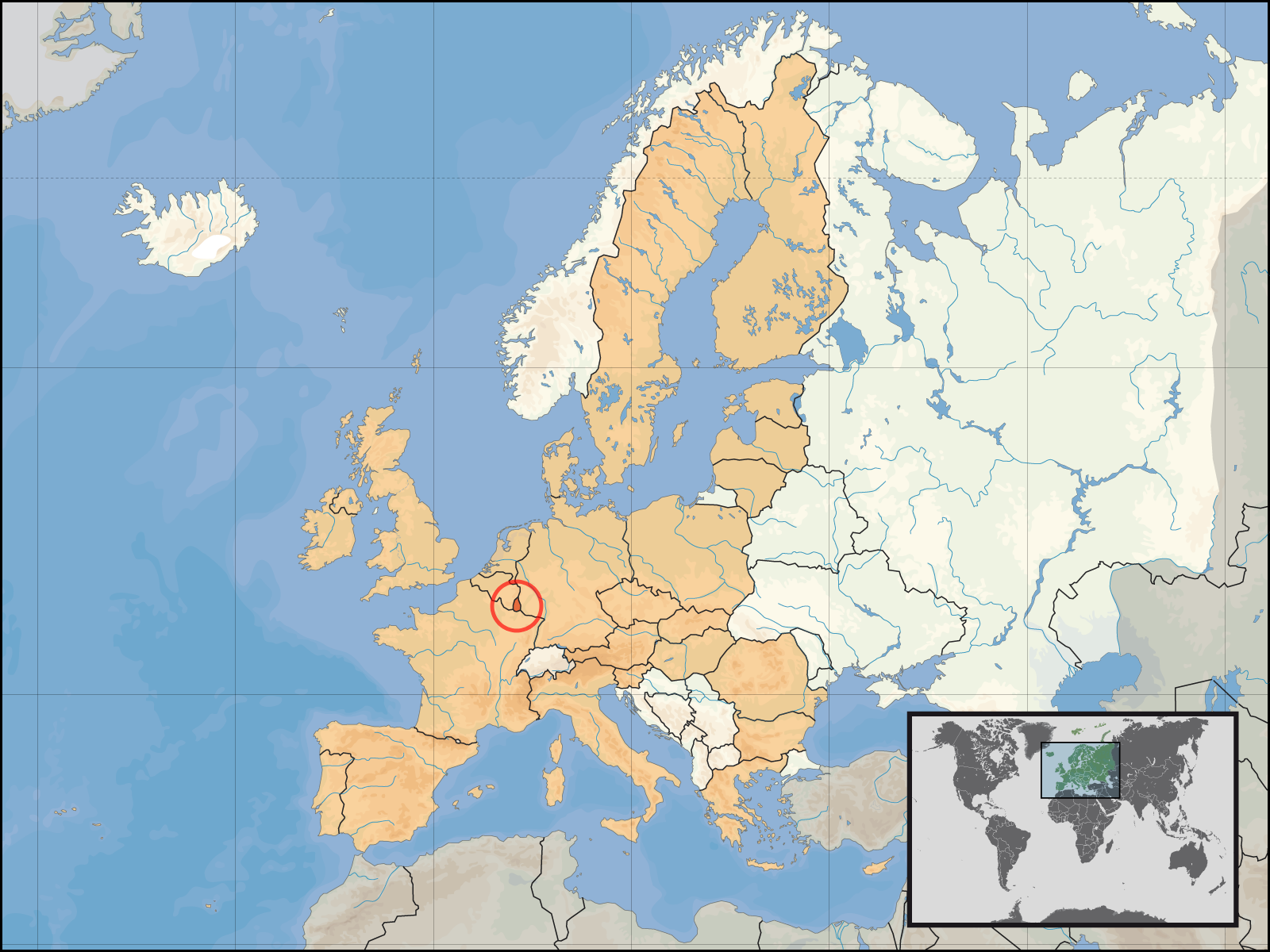
Location of the Grand Duchy of Luxembourg (circled), illustrating its proximity to other countries.

On 19 December 1929 the Grand Duchy of Luxembourg established a state monopoly on broadcasting, but the law provided for possible concessions to private companies who wanted to use radio bandwidth, with the state charging a fixed amount for private use of radio.

The Société Luxembourgeoise d'Études Radiophoniques (SLER) was founded on 11 May 1929 with the aim of obtaining an eventual broadcasting contract from the Luxembourg government. This company was run by Luxembourger François Anen, French publisher Henry Etienne, and French engineer Jean le Duc representing the Compagnie des Compteurs de Montrouge, which possessed 84% of the project's capital and had signed a secret agreement to work with the group CSF, the main stockholder in Radio Paris. Radio Paris wanted to set up a powerful peripheral radio station in Luxembourg, outside of the strict French regulations that only allowed public stations. A 25-year agreement between the SLER and the Luxembourg government signed on 29 September 1930 ensured the Luxembourg government a fee of 30% on future profits of the station. The agreement also set up a committee for programming and a technical committee which allowed the government to regulate the private station.

The Compagnie Luxembourgeoise de Radiodiffusion (CLR) was founded on 30 May 1931, officially replacing the SLER.

On 14 January 1933, experimental broadcasts by Radio Luxembourg began at 1191 metres (200 kW), an unauthorized wavelength, from the longwave transmitter at Junglinster. The official opening of broadcast was on 15 March 1933 at 19:00 with a pre-recorded concert of light music. Radio Luxembourg broadcast each evening from 19:00 to 23:00, in German, French and Dutch and was therefore the only French-language private broadcaster available in France and Belgium. Programmes in English débuted on 3 December 1933 under the editorial guidance of Stephen Williams.

The station closed down at the outbreak of World War II in 1939, but it resumed service after the War.

Beginning in 1946, it could be heard easily in France. Until the 1980s, only the French public radio networks could transmit from France itself. Radio Luxembourg was one of private "peripheral" networks transmitting from abroad.

Radio Luxembourg quickly gained a large audience in France. In the 1960s, it was faced with the success of another peripheral network from Germany, Europe 1, which adopted a modern tone and attracted a young audience.

=== RTL ===
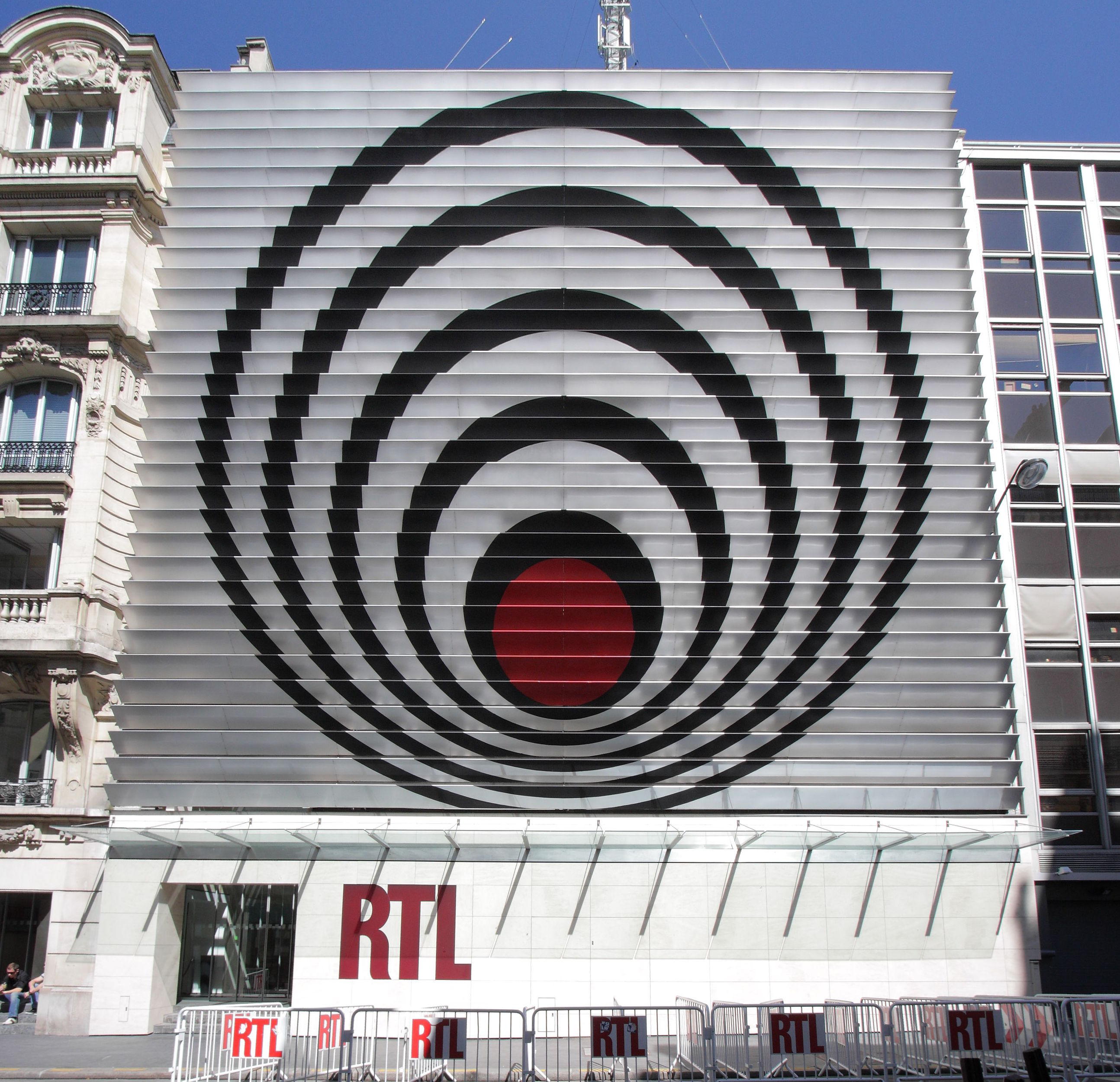
RTL's former headquarters at 22 Rue Bayard in Paris

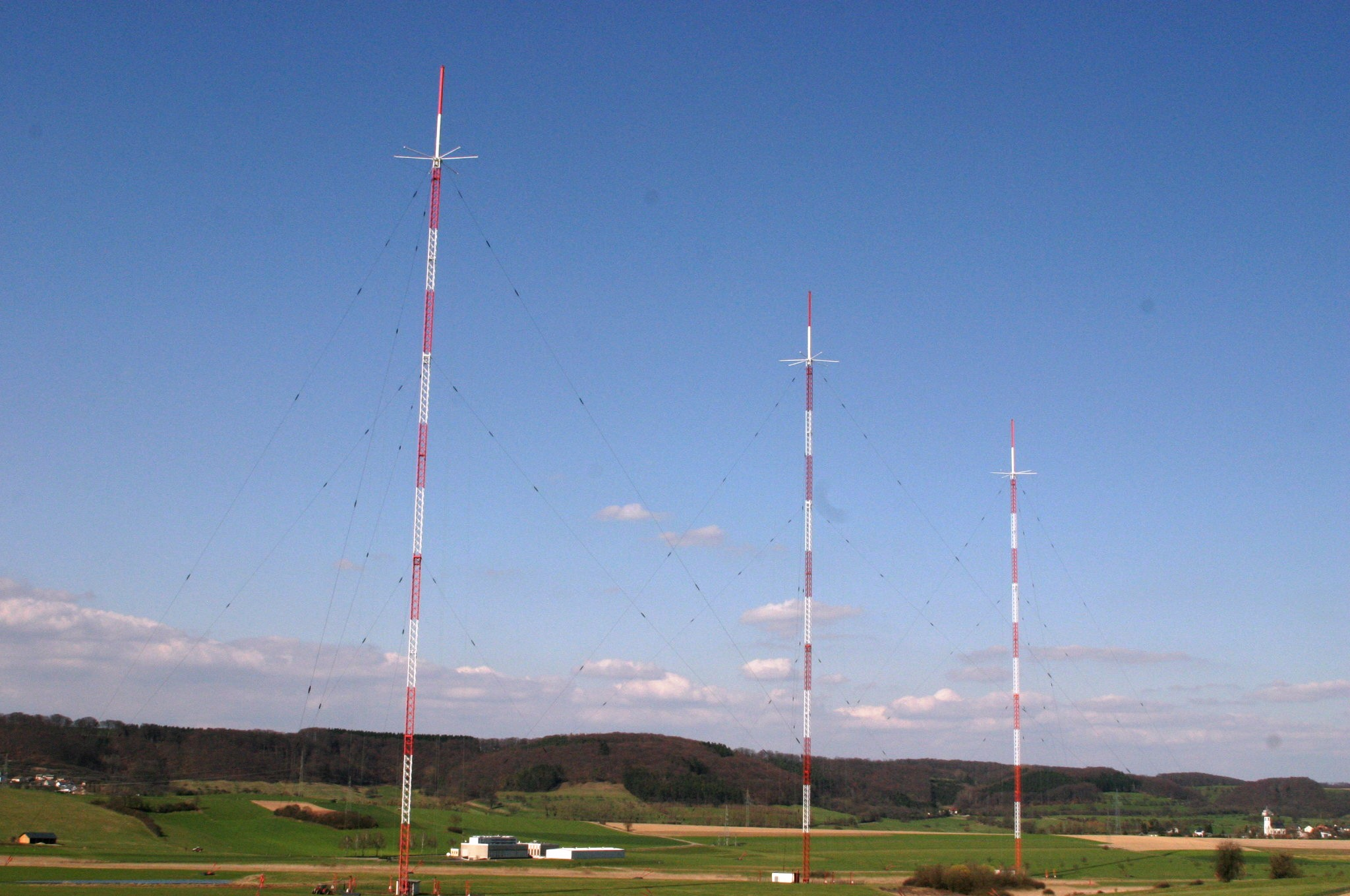
The Beidweiler (Luxembourg) Longwave Transmitter is the high-power broadcasting transmitter for RTL on the longwave frequency 234 kHz

Radio Luxembourg's changing environment led to the station being renamed "RTL" on 11 October 1966, less obviously mentioning its connection with Luxembourg (the acronym being short for Radio Télévision Luxembourg).

During the May 1968 civil unrest and protests by workers and students, the French public radio networks were on strike and TV was not independent from the government. RTL and Europe 1 were the main ways of obtaining independent information for the French people. They were nicknamed "barricades radio".

Unlike the British government's treatment of the Luxembourg English service, which was never allowed to have a landline from London, the French service has long had its main studios in Paris, with a landline from there to the transmitter. Consequently, it appears to the listener as simply a big French national radio station, as the Luxembourg connection is downplayed.

In 1981, under president François Mitterrand, privately run radio stations were allowed to broadcast in France. RTL, now broadcasting in France mostly at 104.3 MHz, was the radio network with the most listeners from 1981 to 2002.

Whereas Luxembourg's English service was always centered on light entertainment and popular music, RTL France is a mixed station. About 50% of its broadcast is information and talk focusing on news and current affairs with a large team of respected journalists.

Radio Luxembourg's two main national competitors are Europe 1 (another out-of-country commercial station, broadcasting from Saarland, again with Paris studios) and the state-owned France Inter. All three stations used to have very high-powered transmitters occupying long-wave frequencies that date back many decades.

The French service has called itself RTL for many years. It broadcasts through a network of FM transmitters throughout France, as well as the internet, cable and satellite.

In 1991 a separate RTL Belgian service in French, called Bel-RTL, was established. Intended for the French-speaking part of Belgium with studios in Brussels, this station is licensed (along with many competing commercial stations) by the Belgian Government with a network of FM transmitters covering Brussels and Wallonia. It has no particular connection with the Grand Duchy of Luxembourg other than its ownership by the RTL parent company.

The end of 2021, RTL was the second-most listened to channel in France, behind France Inter, according to the Médiamétrie Étude Audience Radio survey. In the November–December 2021 survey period, RTL had about 6 million daily listeners.

In October 2022, RTL announced it would end its longwave broadcasts on January 1, 2023, in an effort to reduce the company's energy use.

RTL's long-wave broadcasts on 234 kHz were discontinued on January 2, 2023, at midnight UTC.

== Programming ==
RTL features a popular daily talk show named Les Grosses Têtes, which has been broadcast since 1977. Other past or current programmes on RTL include:

- RTL Matin, the morning news session
- Ça peut vous arriver
- La Tête dans les étoiles, game with a star
- RTL Soir, the evening news
- Les Nocturnes, night-time broadcast on US music
- Stop ou Encore, a musical broadcast
- Le Journal Inattendu (the Unexpected News Bulletin), which consists of a news bulletin followed by a magazine conceived by a guest; was created in 1967; current anchor since 2011 is Marie Drucker
- Le Grand Jury, a political broadcast
- Malice, a cultural game
- Hit Parade, a musical chart
- La Valise RTL, a game

=== Station slogans ===
- 1977–1979: « RTL, c'est vous »
- 1990–: « Les infos, c'est comme le café, c'est bon quand c'est chaud et quand c'est fort »
- 1991–: « RTL, L'information en capitales »
- 1990s–: « RTL, La vie en trois lettres »
- 1996–: « RTL, Essentiel »
- 2001–2005: « RTL, Vivre ensemble »
- 2006–2007: « RTL, c'est vous »
- 2007–2008: « Le plus RTL »
- 2008–2009: « 100 % RTL »; « RTL, c'est vous »
- 2009–2011: « RTL, première radio de France »
- 2011–: « Qui vous connait mieux que RTL ? »
- Since 2012: « RTL, toujours avec vous »
- Since 2014 : « RTL Première radio de France »

== Administration ==
List of RTL/Radio Luxembourg presidents:

- 1933–1953: Jacques Lacour-Gayet
- 1965–1975: Jean Prouvost
- 1975–1979: Christian Chavanon
- 1979–2000: Jacques Rigaud
- 2000–2005: Rémy Sautter
- 2005–2009: Axel Duroux
- Since 2009: Christopher Baldelli

List of director-generals/heads of programming:

- 1933–1934: Jehan Martin
- 1934–: René-Louis Peulvey
- 1966–1978: Jean Farran
- 1978–1985: Raymond Castans
- 1985–2000: Philippe Labro
- 2000–: Stéphane Duhamel
- 2001–2005: Robin Leproux
- 2005–2006: Axel Duroux
- 2006–2010: Frédéric Jouve
  - 2007–2008: Deputy head of programming: Jean-Marc Dorangeon
- 2010–2012: Yves Bigot
- 2012–2018: Jacques Expert
- Since 2017: Gauthier Hourcade
- Since 2017: Ghislain Thomas

List of directeurs de l'antenne:

- 2005–2006: Jean-François Latour
- Since 2006: Jean-Yves Hautemulle

== See also ==
- RTL Group
- Jacques Danois, RTL reporter
