= TF1+ =

French free video streaming service

- Logo used since 8 January 2024

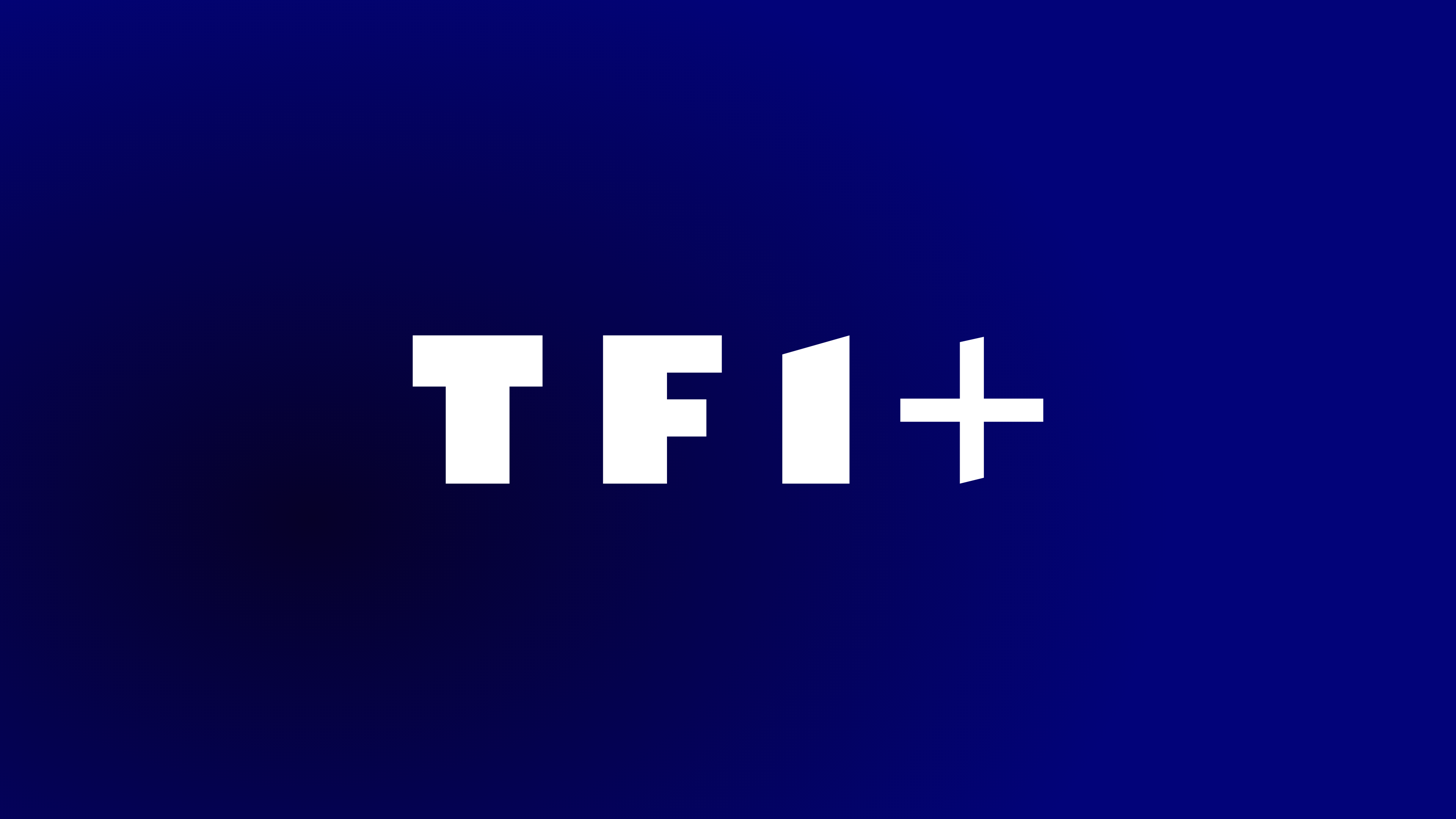
- Presentation image of TF1+
- Former names: TF1.fr (1999–2011); MyTF1 (Q3273359) (2011–2024)
- Website type: Video on demand, OTT streaming platform
- Available in: French
- Founded: 3 December 1995; 30 years ago
- Headquarters: TF1 Tower, Boulogne-Billancourt, Hauts-de-Seine, Île-de-France, France
- Area served: France, Luxembourg, Belgium, Switzerland
- Owner: TF1 Group
- Website: Official website
- Launched: 1996; 30 years ago
- Current status: Active

TF1+ (previously TF1.fr and TF1 Vision later MyTF1 and MyTF1 VOD then just MyTF1) is a French streaming and video-on-demand platform, launched by the TF1 Group on 8 January 2024, succeeding MyTF1. The service allows live viewing of TF1, TMC, TFX, TF1 Séries Films and LCI channels as well as some online channels financed by advertising and the L'Équipe channel and its catch-up TV content.

== Description ==
TF1+ is an online video platform from the TF1 group operating the MyTF1 video content streaming service. Funded by advertising, the TF1+ service is accessible for free as well as through a paid subscription with less systematic advertising.

The platform uses the Synchro tool as its content recommendation algorithm, which is specifically designed for group viewing, particularly for families.

== History ==
In 1996, the TF1 Group launched the TF1 channel website. In 2006, it created the online video platform WAT, aimed at 15-34 year olds. Over the following decades, the Group developed various products and services allowing its information and entertainment programs to be consumed live or on a non-linear basis.

=== TF1 Vision ===
At the end of 2005, TF1 offered internet users residing in France the opportunity to watch or rewatch some of its programs via the TF1 Vision service. Internet users whose IP address is geolocated outside of France cannot directly access these videos.

=== MyTF1 ===
The MyTF1 brand existed from September 2011 to January 2024, MyTF1 News (originally TF1 News until 24 February 2013) existed from 4 November 2009 until 29 August 2016 and MyTF1 VOD from 2011 to 2020.

In May 2012, TF1 clarified its strategy on tablets and mobile devices by launching an advertising check-in application. This represents a major step forward for the channel in the area of social television. At the beginning of 2013, TF1 continued its development with the MyTF1 Connect service. This extends the viewer's experience by offering additional content during the broadcast (behind the scenes, games, additional information, etc.). It is used in particular for shows like The Voice France.

In 2013, TF1 News was renamed MyTF1 News.

On Tuesday, 19 May 2015, in a press release, the Group announced a new plan for their site including TF1, TMC, NT1 (now TFX) and HD1 (now TF1 Séries Films), the group's 4 free-to-air channels. This change took place on Tuesday, 26 May 2015. LCI became free-to-air on 5 April 2016 with the complete switch to HD DTT, including on MyTF1.

MyTF1 Xtra was launched on 1 September 2015. This new service is the successor to the video platform called Wat.tv, created by the TF1 Group and closed since 17 February 2016. It offers series and old shows (like Coucou c'est nous! and Cat's Eyes). In February 2017, MyTF1 Xtra added a daily esports show called Trash Talk in partnership with Eclypsia. The Xtra brand disappeared in 2017 and MyTF1 continued to add on-demand content to the platform.

On 29 August 2016, MyTF1 News merged with Metronews and became LCI.FR, creating a unified multi-platform brand. On January 24, 2022, LCI.fr became TF1 info.

In 2017, the TF1 Group suspended the broadcast of certain MyTF1 services on SFR TV and Canal. The SFR TV suspension lasted from 29 July 2017 to 7 November 2017. The Canal suspension lasted from 1 November 2017 until November 2018.

=== TF1+ ===
On 13 November 2023, TF1 Group announced the launch of TF1+ for 8 January 2024, destined to gradually replace MyTF1. The goal is to recapture part of the 25-49 age group, which is of particular interest to advertisers. TF1 indicates that it wants to offer a free platform whose economic model relies on advertising to differentiate itself from American platforms such as Netflix and Amazon Prime Video.

In April 2024, TF1 group indicated that it was observing a 20% increase in the number of annual unique visitors compared to MyTF1.

On 19 June 2026, TF1+ and all the channels of the TF1 Group were made available on the Netflix platform following an agreement signed between the two groups a year earlier.

== Logos ==
Logo of TF1.fr from 1999 to 2006

Logo of TF1+/TF1.fr since 8 January 2024

== Channels ==
=== TF1 Group channels ===
In addition to content on the tf1.fr portal, the platform offers digital livestreams of the following channels owned by TF1 Group:

- TF1
- TMC
- TFX
- TF1 Séries Films
- La Chaîne Info (LCI)

=== Partner channels ===
At the same time, it offers linear digital channels from other content providers that have partnered with TF1 Group:

- Arte France
- LCP - Assemblée nationale / Public Sénat
- La Chaîne de l'Équipe
- Le Figaro TV

=== FAST channels ===
TF1+ also has a list of FAST channels that are broadcast on the platform

==== Current ====
TF1+'s current free ad-supported streaming television (FAST) channels are listed on its Web site. Channels include:

FAST Channel Name	About
Tomorrow Is Ours (Demain nous appartient)	Episodes from the series.
Where It All Begins (Ici tout commence)	Episodes from the series.
Life Is Beautiful, Even More Beautiful (Plus belle la vie, encore plus belle)	Episodes from the series.
Comedy Fiction (Comédie Fiction)	Various Fictional Comedy shows.
No Secrets Between Us (Pas de secrets entre nous)	Episodes from the series.
Sing! (Chante !)	Episodes from the series.
Under The Sun (Sous le soleil)	Episodes from the series.
Lightning (Foudre)	Episodes from the series.
Camping Heaven (Camping Paradis)	Episodes from the series.
Our Dear Neighbors (Nos chers voisins)	Episodes from the series.
Josephine, Guardian Angel (Joséphine, ange gardien)	Episodes from the series.
The Mysteries of Love (Les Mystères de l'amour)	Episodes from the series.
Foster Family (Famille d'accueil)	Episodes from the series.
Les Bracelets rouges (Les Bracelets rouges)	Episodes from the French series.
I Promise You (Je te promets)	Episodes from the series.
Balthazar (Balthazar)	Episodes from the series.
Investigation Unit (Section de recherches)	Episodes from the series.
Alice Nevers: The Judge is a Woman (Alice Nevers : Le juge est une femme)	Episodes from the series.
In Love With Berlin (Le Destin de Lisa)	Episodes of the French airing for the series.
Naruto; French dub (Naruto VF)	Episodes from the French dub of the series.
Palmashow TV (Palmashow TV)	Episodes from the series.
Moms & Celebrities (Mamans & célèbres)	Episodes from the series.
Star Academy France 2001–2008 (Star Academy France 2001–2008)	Episodes from different seasons of the French version of the show from 2001 to 2008.
The Villa of Broken Hearts (La Villa des cœurs brisés)	Episodes from different seasons of the show.
François Damiens' hidden cameras (Les caméras cachées de François Damiens)	Various content starring François Damiens.
Dancing with the Stars France (Danse avec les stars)	Episodes from different seasons of the French version of the show.
Lolywood TV (Lolywood TV)	Episodes from the series.
Ushuaïa TV For Change	Nature Documentaries
Secret Story France (Secret Story France)	Episodes from different seasons of the French version of the show.
The Masked Singer France (Mask Singer France)	Episodes from different seasons of the French version of the show.
Supernanny France (Super Nanny France)	Episodes from different seasons of the French version of the show.
Baby Boom (Baby Boom)	Episodes from the series.
The Tossers (Les Enfoirés)	Episodes from the series.
Restaurants of Love (Les Restaurants du Cœur)	Episodes from the series.
PJ Masks; French dub (Pyjamasques VF)	Episodes from the French dub of the series.
Mighty Express; French dub (Mighty Express VF)	Episodes from the French dub of the series.
Cry Babies BFF	Episodes from the series.
Cédric (Cédric)	Episodes from the series.

== Services ==
=== TF1 Info ===
TF1 Info
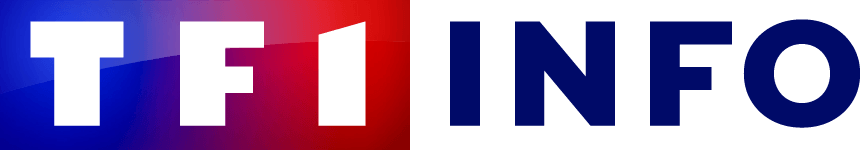
- Logo used since 24 January 2022
- Former names: TF1 Infos (1998–2000); La Chaîne Info/LCI (2000–2009); TF1 News (2009–2013); MyTF1 News (2013–2016); La Chaîne Info/LCI (2016–2022)
- Website type: Information, Online newspaper
- Available in: French
- Headquarters: TF1 Tower, Boulogne-Billancourt, Hauts-de-Seine, Île-de-France, France
- Owner: e-TF1 (TF1 Group)
- Managing director: Thierry Thuillier
- Website: Official website
- Launched: 1998; 28 years ago
- Current status: Active

TF1 Info (sometimes branded as TF1 INFO in all caps; originally TF1 Infos, later La Chaîne Info / LCI, then TF1 News, then MyTF1 News and then La Chaîne Info / LCI again) is the news service of TF1.

==== History of TF1 Info ====
TF1's news website has existed since 1998 but was called infos.tf1.fr. It then took the name LCI.fr in June 2000, referencing the group's news channel, then TF1 News in 2009 and MyTF1 News on 24 February 2013, and finally TF1 INFO since 24 January 2022.

On 8 May 2026, the National Communication Observatory in Niger suspended TF1 INFO due to its "repeated dissemination of content likely to seriously undermine public order, national unity, social cohesion, and the stability of republican institutions". The decision was criticised by the Committee to Protect Journalists as "censorship".

==== Logo ====
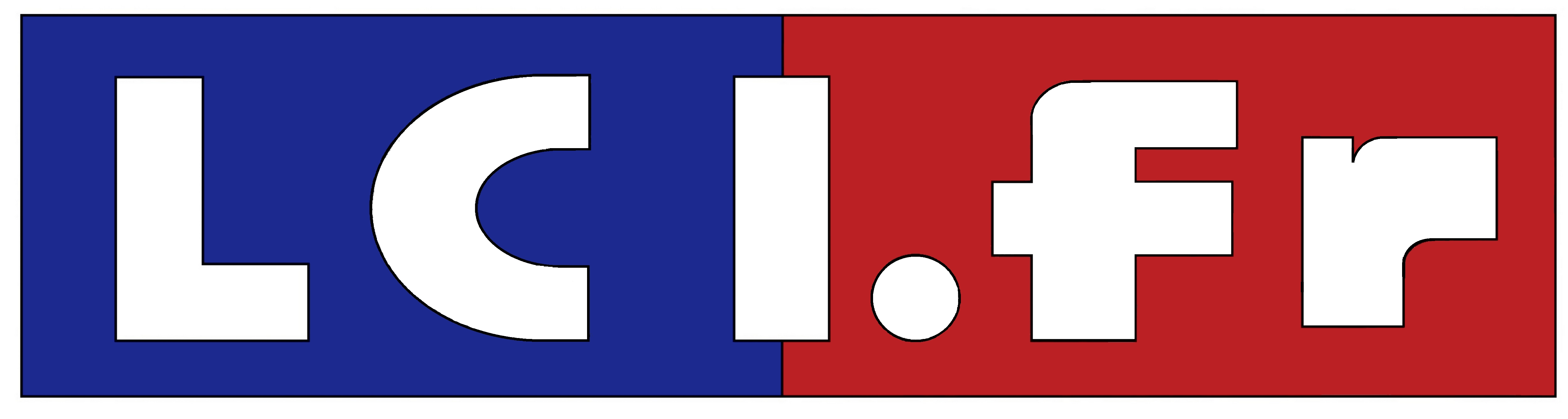
Logo of LCI.fr from June 2000 to October 2006

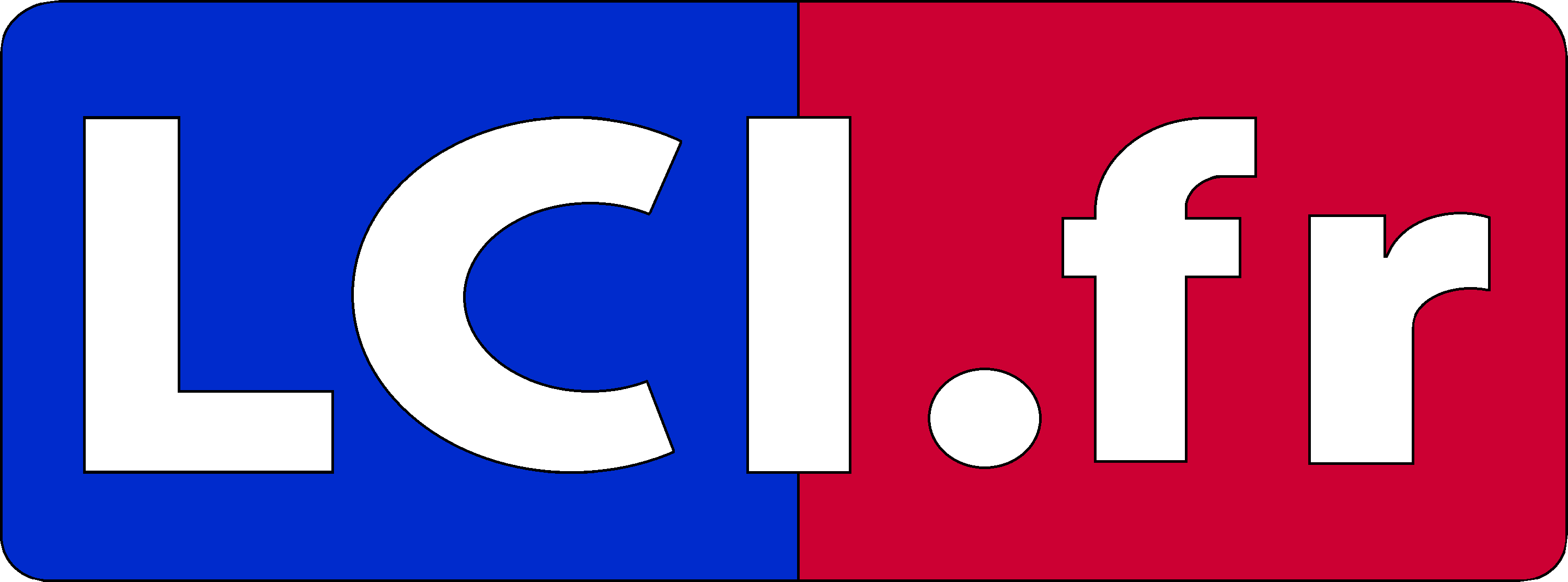
Logo of LCI.fr from October 2006 to 4 November 2009

Logo of LCI and LCI.fr website from 30 August 2017 to 24 January 2022

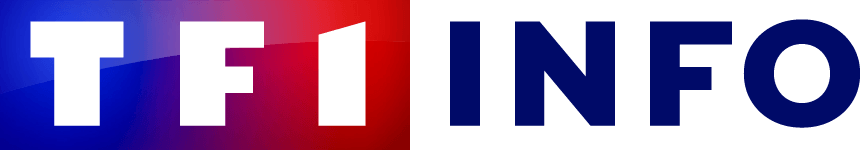
Logo of TF1 Info since 24 January 2022

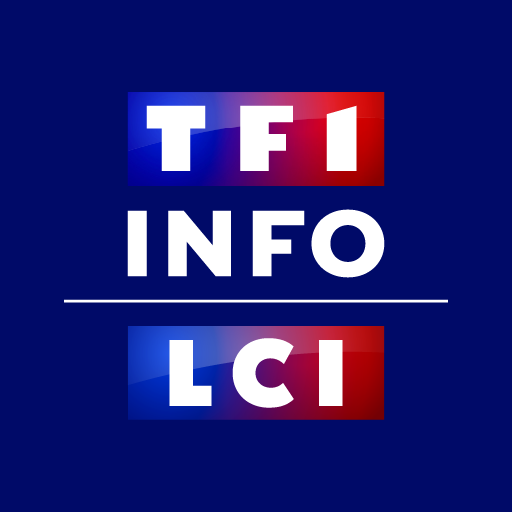
Alternate logo of TF1 Info (with the LCI logo) since 24 January 2022

=== MYTF1 VOD ===
MyTF1 VOD
- Former name: TF1 Vision (2005–2011)
- Website type: Video on demand
- Available in: French
- Dissolved: 21 July 2020; 6 years ago
- Headquarters: TF1 Tower, Boulogne-Billancourt, Hauts-de-Seine, Île-de-France, France
- Owner: TF1 Group
- Managing director: Tristan Du Laz
- Website: Official website
- Launched: 15 November 2005; 21 years ago
- Current status: Closed

MyTF1 VOD (formerly TF1 Vision) is the former video-on-demand service offered by the TF1 Group. This site was available from 15 November 2005 to 21 July 2020 on the Internet and from Internet service providers Free, Bouygues Telecom and Numericable via connected TV. In Belgium, MyTF1 VOD was available on Proximus TV but under the name TF1 Vision with a very limited catalogue.

==== Description ====
The MyTF1 VOD internet video-on-demand service was launched on 15 November 2005. It was produced by the video subsidiary of the TF1 Group, TF1 Video.

==== Market ====
Since its inception, the French video-on-demand market has remained extremely competitive. TF1 Vision was headed by Pascal Lechevallier, who is also the development director of TF1 Video.

==== Logo ====
Logo of TF1 Vision from 15 November 2005 to December 2006

=== TF1+ Premium ===
TF1+ Premium (formerly MyTF1 Max) is a paid service considered an extended version of TF1+ (formerly MyTF1). It was launched on 23 November 2021. This service offers an ad-free version, in Full HD (1080p), a 30-day extension of TF1 group programs and availability within the European Union.

At the end of 2022, MyTF1 Max was expanded with live program broadcasts available exclusively to subscribers, namely certain matches of the 2021 Women's Rugby World Cup and the 24/7 livestream feed of Star Academy 10.

On 8 January 2024, MyTF1 Max became TF1+ Premium.

== Broadcasts, platforms and apps ==
MyTF1 is available on Bouygues Telecom's BBox, Orange TV, Freebox TV and SFR TV (suspended between 29 July 2017 and 6 November 2017 then back in a premium version since 7 November 2017). This service gives access to the entire TF1 universe and allows you to watch a wide selection of programs for free and access the video-on-demand offer of MyTF1 VOD (formerly TF1 Vision). Numerous services complement this offering in all areas (information, sports, games, etc.). MyTF1 is also available on mobile, tablet and as a computer application. The service is also available on Canal and Canal+ set-top boxes (suspended from 1 November 2017 to November 2018).

MyTF1 VOD was the most widely distributed platform on the market, accessible from most ISPs (Free, SFR, Bouygues Telecom, Numericable and PC), on iOS and Google Play. The platform was also the first to launch PREMIUM VOD, with the biggest American series, broadcast simultaneously with their broadcast in the United States.

== See also ==
- france.tv
- M6+
- Canal+
- Video on demand
