= RTL Matin =

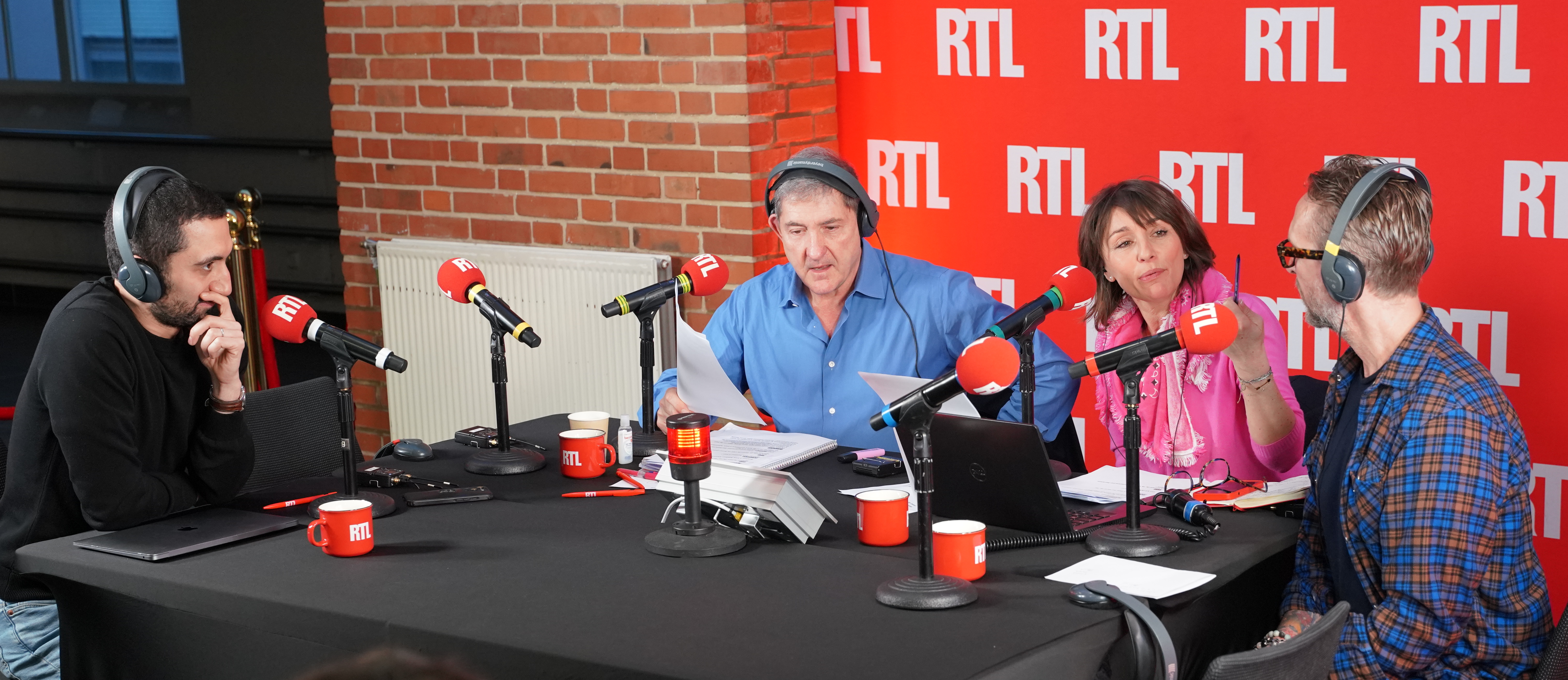
2024

RTL Matin (RTL Morning) is the main morning news programme on the French generalist commercial radio network RTL. It goes out on weekdays 7.00-9.00 and weekends 7.00-10.15 and is France's most listened-to news programme.

From what had originally begun as a morning music sequence incorporating regular news bulletins, RTL Matin eventually developed into an "all-news" programme as the proportion of time given over to news, comment and background reports gradually grew.

The programme's main presenter since 2014 has been Yves Calvi, who also presents the culture and entertainment review Laissez-Vous Tenter, which follows between 9.00 and 9.30 each weekday.
