= M6 Music Black =

- Country: France

Ownership
- Owner: M6 Group
- Sister channels: M6

History
- Launched: 10 January 2005; 21 years ago
- Closed: 4 January 2015; 11 years ago

Links
- Website: www.m6musicblack.fr

M6 Music Black was a French television owned and operated by M6, devoted to playing contemporary R&B and hip hop music.

The channel closed due to unprofitability.
