= M6 (TV channel) =

French national television network

- Country: France
- Headquarters: 89 avenue Charles de Gaulle 92200 Neuilly-sur-Seine, France

Programming
- Language: French
- Picture format: 1080i HDTV (downscaled to 576i for the SD feed)

Ownership
- Owner: M6 Group
- Sister channels: W9; 6ter Gulli; Paris Première; Téva; M6 Music; Série Club; RFM TV; MCM Top; Canal J TiJi

History
- Launched: 1 March 1987; 39 years ago
- Founder: Jean Drucker
- Replaced: TV6 France (1986–1987)

Links
- Website: www.m6.fr

Availability

Terrestrial
- TNT: Channel 6 (HD)

M6 (French pronunciation: [ɛm sis]), also known as Métropole Télévision, is the most profitable private national French television channel and the third most watched television network in the French-speaking world. M6 is the head channel of the M6 Group media empire that owns several TV channels, magazines, publications, movie production companies, and media-related firms. It is owned by RTL Group.

On 20 May 2021, it was announced that M6 Group, owners of the channel, has proposed a merger with TF1 Group, which owns competing commercial network TF1. On 16 September 2022, it was announced that the merger was officially abandoned, citing concerns from French antitrust regulator, the Autorité de la concurrence, regarding competition in the advertising sector; the combined entity was likely to have been required to sell either primary channel (M6 or TF1) for the merger to proceed.

== History ==
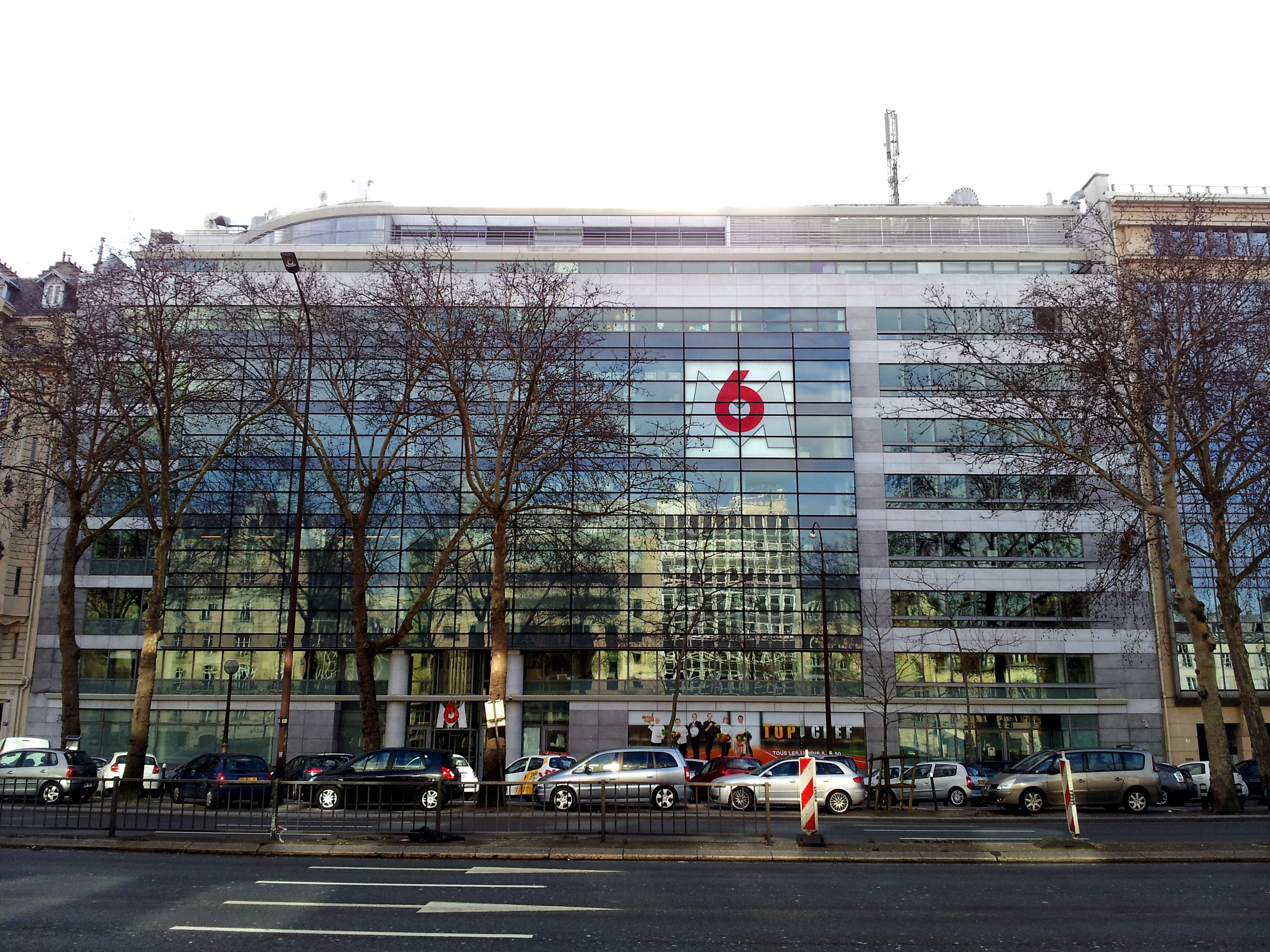
M6 headquarters, 89 avenue Charles-de-Gaulle in Neuilly-sur-Seine

M6 launched on 1 March 1987, at 11:15 am CET, taking the place of TV6.

M6's current on-air brand image, introduced in May 2020, suggests that it tailors its service to teenagers and young-adult demographics. Its current programs lineup include:

- French TV shows: Les Bleus, Scènes de Ménages, Vous les femmes
- French TV programs : Capital, Zone Interdite, Enquête Exclusive, Top Chef, Un dîner presque parfait, 100% Mag, 66 Minutes, Recherche Appartement ou Maison, L'amour est dans le pré, Maison à vendre, On ne choisit pas ses voisins, Belle toute nue, Nouveau Look pour une nouvelle vie, Hits Machines, M6 Boutique, LE 1945 and LE 1245 (news), Top tendance, Le meilleur patissier de france, Danse avec les stars, Morning Live, ...
- American TV shows: Blue Bloods; Elementary; Criminal Minds: Beyond Borders (Esprits criminels : Unité sans frontières); Hawaii Five-0 (Hawaii 5-0); When Calls the Heart (Le cœur a ses raisons); Modern Family; How to Get Away with Murder (Murder); NCIS: New Orleans (NCIS: Nouvelle Orléans); New Girl; Quantico; Reign (Reign : Le Destin d'une reine); Rosewood; Scorpion; Good Witch (Un soupçon de magie); Once Upon A Time; NCIS (NCIS: enquêtes spéciales); NCIS: Los Angeles; Prison Break; Bones; Supernatural and Secrets and Lies (Secrets and Lies : l'affaire Tom Murphy); The X-Files (X-Files, aux frontières du réel); 24: Legacy; Bull; Code Black; MacGyver
- These American TV shows were previously shown on M6: Smallville;Scrubs; The Unit (The Unit : commando d'élite);Stargate Atlantis; Nip/Tuck; Californication; Kyle XY; Everybody Hates Chris (Tout le monde déteste Chris);Terra Nova; Desperate Housewives;Lie to Me;Medium (Médium); My Name Is Earl (Earl); Numbers; Charmed; The 4400 (Les 4 400); Jericho; The Dead Zone (Dead Zone); Stargate SG-1; Malcolm in the Middle (Malcolm); Friends; Alias; Sex and the City; Veronica Mars; Buffy the Vampire Slayer (Buffy contre les vampires); Ally McBeal; Roswell; Profiler; The Pretender (Le Caméléon); The Sentinel; Sliders (Sliders, les mondes parallèles); Hope & Faith (La Star de la famille); 8 Simple Rules (Touche pas à mes filles); My Wife and Kids (Ma famille d'abord); Still Standing (Une famille presque parfaite); Early Edition (Demain à la Une); Wildfire; Once and Again (Deuxième chance); Relic Hunter (Sydney Fox, l'aventurière); Medical Investigation (NIH : alertes médicales); Tru Calling (Tru Calling : compte à rebours); Commander in Chief; 1-800-Missing (Missing : disparus sans laisser de trace); Dark Skies (Dark Skies : l'impossible vérité); The Inside (The Inside : dans la tête des tueurs); Killer Instinct; Vanished; John Doe; LAX; Jake 2.0; Blind Justice; Threshold (Threshold : premier contact); Summerland; Beautiful People; Young Americans; Special Unit 2; The Evidence (The Evidence : les preuves du crime); South Beach; L.A. Heat (Los Angeles Heat); Married... with Children (Mariés, deux enfants); The Cosby Show (Cosby Show); Who's the Boss? (Madame est servie); The Nanny (Une nounou d'enfer); Little House on the Prairie (La Petite Maison dans la prairie); The Simpsons (Les Simpson); Bewitched (Ma sorcière bien-aimée); The Wonder Years (Les années coup de cœur) and Family Affair (Cher Oncle Bill).
- American programs: High School Musical; Camp Rock; America's Got Talent (with its own version : La France a un incroyable talent), American Idol (La Nouvelle Star), KaBlam! (KarToon (M6 version))
- British TV shows: Primeval; Secret Diary of a Call Girl (Journal intime d'une call girl).
- British TV programs: Britain's Got Talent (with its own version : La France a un incroyable talent), Pop Idol (with its own version : Nouvelle Star), The X-Factor (with its own version), Wife Swap
- These British TV shows were previously shown on M6: Footballers' Wives (Femme$ de footballeurs); Queer as Folk; Totally Frank; Bugs; and Hex (Hex : la malédiction).
- These Canadian TV shows were shown on M6: Sue Thomas: F.B.Eye (Sue Thomas, l'œil du FBI) and Falcon Beach.
- Investigative journalism shows, such as Capital, Zone interdite and Enquête Exclusive.
- Long-lasting short programs, such as Turbo, CinéSix, and E=M6, as well as numerous music videos.

In 2001, M6 became the first national French television network to broadcast reality programming. Its first program of this genre was Loft Story, and was highly watched. The president of TF1 at the time, Étienne Mougeotte, promised that TF1 would never air any reality programming. However, several months later, TF1 signed a contract with Endemol to air such programming. Endemol is the same company that created Loft Story for M6.

M6 is one of the only television services in France to have science-fiction programming as part of its regular schedule. Most supernatural dramas were shown on Saturday nights in what M6 called "la Trilogie du Samedi" (The Saturday Trilogy)

=== M6+ ===
On 19 March 2008, M6 launched a new website, in addition to its official site. This TV Catch-up called M6 Replay allows French Internet users (metropolitan France only) to view all M6 programs in the 6 p.m.-midnight slot (excluding films) one hour after their broadcasts, for one week. On 4 November 2013, M6 Replay was replaced by 6play.

On 27 March 2014, M6 launched 4 new thematic channels, "100% online", on 6play: 6play Comic (Humor), 6play Crazy Kitchen (Cooking), 6play Sixième Style (Fashion/Beauty), and 6play Stories (TV films). On 9 February 2015, M6 launched 6play home time (Universe de la Maison).

On 1 December 2015, a new version of 6play was launched. A new 6play design is launched for the occasion and 6play now uses a personalized recommendation system under the "My selection" section similar to that of Netflix.

From 14 May 2024, 6play became M6+.

In its first-quarter 2026 financial report, released on 28 April 2026, M6 Group reported that the M6+ platform had reached 31.7 million unique users, a 14% increase over the previous year. The group also confirmed its position as the exclusive free-to-air broadcaster for all matches of the 2026 FIFA World Cup in France, anticipating that the tournament would drive record digital engagement for the streaming service.

== Logo history ==
M6's third logo from 1987 to 1999

M6's fourth logo from 1999 to 2009

== Programmes ==
=== News ===
- Le 12:45 (national edition) and 19:45 (national edition), afternoon and evening news.
- Zone Interdite, France's most influential Newsmagazine
- 66 Minutes weekly news magazine.
- Capital, Economy-oriented newsmagazine.
- Enquête Exclusive, Investigation magazine.

=== Show and reality show ===
- Les reines du shopping
- X Factor
- Ice show
- Nouvelle star, (French adaptation of Pop Idol) reality television (until 2011, then it moved on D8)
- L'amour est dans le pré, French adaptation of Farmer Wants a Wife
- D&CO, homestyle show.
- E=M6, science magazine.
- Top Chef, French adaptation of Top Chef
- Belle toute nue, the French equivalent of Channel 4's How to Look Good Naked.
- Turbo, motor magazine.
- Chef, la recette, culinary magazine
- Vocation Medecin, health magazine
- Hit Machine, musical show.
- M6 Kid, program for children.
- Pekin Express, French adaptation of Dutch show Peking Express.
- Off Prime
- Accès Privé, entertainment news magazine
- Un dîner presque parfait, the French adaptation of Come Dine with Me
- Nouveau look pour une nouvelle vie, fashion magazine
- On ne choisit pas ses voisins, family magazine
- La France a un incroyable talent, the French adaptation of Britain's Got Talent
- Le Meilleur Pâtissier, the French adaptation of The Great British Bake Off
- Le choix, the French adaptation of The Taste.
- Cauchemar en cuisine, the French adaptation of Kitchen Nightmares.
- Show Me Your Voice, the French adaptation of I Can See Your Voice
- Lego Masters
- Le Juste Prix, the French adaptation of The Price Is Right
- Qui veut être mon associé?, the French adaptation of Dragons' Den
- Sport 6, sport magazine

=== Series ===
- 90210 Beverly Hills : Nouvelle Génération
- Blue Bloods
- Body of Proof
- Bones
- Burn Notice
- Californication
- Desperate Housewives
- Drop Dead Diva
- Earl
- En famille (French creation)
- FBI : Duo très spécial
- Glee
- Hawaii 5-0
- Journal intime d'une call girl
- Justified
- Kaamelott (French creation)
- L'Homme de la situation (French creation)
- La Méthode Claire (French creation)
- Le Transporteur (French-Canadian creation)
- Lie to Me
- Ma famille d'abord
- Ma femme, ma fille, deux bébés (French creation)
- Médium
- Modern Family
- NCIS : Enquêtes spéciales
- NCIS: Los Angeles
- New Girl
- Numbers
- Once Upon a Time
- Ringer
- Scènes de ménages (French creation)
- Scrubs
- Soda (French creation)
- Sons of Anarchy
- Supernatural
- Terra Nova
- The Finder
- The Glades
- The Good Wife
- un gars une fille
- Un, dos, tres
- Under the Dome
- Victoire Bonnot (French creation)
- Wes et Travis

=== M6 Kid ===
- Presto ! School of Magic
- Alvinn!!! and the Chipmunks
- The Adventures of Paddington
- Dogmatix and the Indomitables
- Les filles de Dad
- Matt's Monsters

== Past programs ==
- Super Nanny
- Culture Pub, a TV advertisements analysing show
- Graines de star, a talents contests show
- Loft Story (French adaptation of Big Brother), M6 and the first French reality show
- Les colocataires (Roommates) a show similar to Loft Story.
- Les Bleus (2006–2010) Police series about five rookies learning the ropes.
- Morning Live, Morning show
- Caméra Café, Comedy
- Nouvelle Star (French adaptation of Pop Idol)
- Êtes-vous plus fort qu'un élève de 10 ans ?, French adaptation of Are You Smarter Than a 5th Grader?
- Rubí rebelde, Venezuelan telenovela
- The Simpsons, moved to sister channel W9
- Total Wipeout (French adaptation of Wipeout)
- Stargate SG-1 The series has been fully aired between 18 September 1998, and 8 December 2007.
- Stargate Atlantis The first two seasons aired between 15 April 2005, and 29 July 2006.
- Atomic Betty Only the first two seasons
- The Toy Castle
- Disney Kid Club, A 2 Programmed Block aired from 2010 to 2016, after M6 Kid and before M6 Kid.
- Secrets d'actualité, Investigation magazine

== See also ==
- List of television stations in France
