= RTL2 (France) =

- Paris; France
- Broadcast area: France
- Frequencies: 105.9 MHz (Paris); 95.7 MHz (Lyon); 106.8 MHz (Marseille)

Programming
- Language: French
- Format: Pop; Rock

Ownership
- Owner: Groupe M6 (RTL Group)
- Sister stations: RTL; Fun Radio

History
- First air date: 6 January 1992; 34 years ago
- Former call signs: M40 (1992–1994); RTL1 (1995)

Links
- Website: www.rtl2.fr

RTL2 is a private French radio station, based in Paris, created in 1992 and owned by the RTL Group through Groupe M6. The station plays rock and pop music from the 1980s onwards.

== History ==
In January 1992, RTL2 was created after a fusion of the stations Maxximum and Radio Métropolys, and afterwards RTL 2 was created, then named M40. The station was owned by Prisa (48.5% of the capital) and the RTL Group (with 35.75% stake).

In January 1995, M40 changed its name to RTL1 and later that year, after a complaint from Europe 1, the station had to change its name again to finally become RTL2.

== Identity of RTL2 ==
=== Logos ===
Old logo of RTL2 from 1995 till 1997.

Current logo of RTL2 since 1997.

=== Slogans ===
- 1995–1996: La musique qui rhytme la vie!
- 1996–1996: Le son soft-rock
- 1996–1998: Écoutez vos envies
- 1998–2005: Ce n'est pas de la radio, c'est de la musique
- Since 2005: Le son pop-rock
