= 6ter =

6TER
- Country: France
- Broadcast area: France, Switzerland
- Headquarters: Neuilly-sur-Seine, France

Programming
- Languages: French; Original audio track

Ownership
- Owner: Groupe M6
- Sister channels: M6; Gulli; W9; Paris Première; Téva; M6 Music; TiJi; Canal J Série Club

History
- Launched: 12 December 2012; 13 years ago

Links
- Website: 6play.fr/6ter

Availability

Terrestrial
- TNT: Channel 22

Streaming media
- MyCanal: Live

6ter (French: [sistɛʁ]) is a French television network that is available free-to-air through digital terrestrial television, satellite and DSL, owned by Groupe M6.

The name's wordplay represents its positioning as M6's little "sister", and (via the ter suffix) as Groupe M6's third free-to-air entertainment channel (after M6 itself and W9).

== History ==
Following the call for applications by the CSA for the launch of six new channels on the DTT, Groupe M6 presented three projects of channels : 6ter, M6 Boutique & Co and Hexa. On 27 March the CSA chose 6ter to be part of the 6 new channels to be launched on 12 December 2012 in HDTV (1080i).

In 2022, it was proposed that 6ter be sold to Altice, as part of a merger of Groupe M6 with Groupe TF1 (alongside TF1-owned channel TFX), in an attempt to alleviate competition concerns. This merger was abandoned in September 2022, leaving Groupe M6 as owners of the channel.

Like its sisters M6 and W9, 6ter has a Swiss subfeed, which air in Swiss providers and in free-to-air on satellite.

== Programming ==
6ter's programming is family-oriented. 6ter shows magazines, documentaries, educational programs, along with children programmes, series and movies.

Until June 2016, 6ter had a weekday children morning block named Trop Toon. Since then, a few cartoons have sometimes been broadcast, notably Tintin.

- 90210 (90210 Beverly Hills : Nouvelle Génération, seasons 4–5, season 1–3 in syndication)
- Buffy the Vampire Slayer (Buffy contre les vampires, HD version, SD version in syndication)
- Extant (season 2, season 1 in syndication)
- Family Blagues
- Fresh Off the Boat (Bienvenue chez les Huang)
- Grease: Live
- Jane the Virgin (since season 2, season 1 in syndication)
- King & Maxwell
- The Messengers
- Modern Family (since season 6, season 1–5 in syndication)
- Off the Map (Off the Map : Urgences au bout du monde)
- Once Upon a Time (season 3 and 5 only, other seasons in syndication)
- Reign (Reign : Le destin d'une reine)
- Sleepy Hollow (since season 2, season 1 in syndication)
- Switched at Birth (Switched)
- Witches of East End
- Zero Hour

== Syndicated programming ==
- 8 Simple Rules
- The Adventures of Tintin
- Arme Millionäre
- Band of Brothers
- Caméra Café
- Charmed
- Crisis
- Der Clown
- Desperate Housewives
- Dinotopia
- Dinotopia: The Series
- Dr. Quinn, Medicine Woman
- Emily Owens, M.D.
- Face au doute
- Geronimo Stilton
- The Good Wife
- Kaamelott
- Kid Paddle
- Kyle XY
- Largo Winch
- Le Petit Nicolas
- Les Cordier, juge et flic
- Life Is Wild
- Little House on the Prairie
- Lou !
- The Magic Roundabout
- Malcolm in the Middle
- Martial Law
- Martine
- Martin Mystery
- Melrose Place
- Murder Rooms: The Dark Beginnings of Sherlock Holmes
- My Wife and Kids
- The Nanny
- No Ordinary Family
- Numbers
- Paris 16e
- Prehistoric Park
- The Pretender
- Primeval
- Raising Hope
- Relic Hunter
- Robin Hood
- Sherlock Holmes
- Smallville
- Sous le soleil
- Step by Step
- Terra Nova
- The New Adventures of Lucky Luke
- Toto Trouble
- Touch
- Un gars, une fille
- Un Paso Adelante
- Victoire Bonnot
