= Fun Radio (France) =

- Neuilly-sur-Seine, Paris Region, France; France
- Broadcast area: France : National (FM & DAB+), Satellite
- Frequencies: 101.9 MHz (Paris); 93.3 MHz (Lyon); 99.7 MHz (Marseille)

Programming
- Language: French
- Format: Contemporary R&B; Rhythm and blues Dance music Electro music House music

Ownership
- Owner: Groupe M6 (RTL Group)
- Sister stations: RTL; RTL2

History
- First air date: October 2, 1985; 41 years ago

Links
- Website: www.funradio.fr

Fun Radio is a French network of FM radio stations created on 2 October 1985 and offering electropop, dance and Eurodance music, operating on 250 different frequencies in France. The station belongs to RTL Group through Groupe M6 as do its sister stations RTL and RTL2. The three radio stations share the same headquarters located in Neuilly-sur-Seine.

As of November 2006, the station had approximately 3.2 million daily listeners.

== History ==
=== 1985-1988: Secession of NRJ ===
Fun Radio was created on October 2, 1985, in the south of France under the name FUN by Éric Péchadre, Pierre Lattès and Jean-Baptiste Blanchemain, who controlled six local NRJ franchise stations belonging to them (Nancy, Grenoble, Montpellier, Bordeaux, Carcassonne and Toulouse) and a Chic FM station (Nice) directed by Françoise Martin, director of antenna and programs with the company Cofirad SA. This secession was prepared in secret with a small team, and the two stations' presenters were informed that day.

Some of the first animators of the station were DJ Didier Sinclair (until 1991), Jean-Luc Reichmann and Julien Courbet. Bernard Montiel was also one of the first animators of Fun Radio, where he hosted a cinema-related show.

Despite a good footprint in the south of France, FUN went through financial difficulties and was bought back in September 1987 by the Hersant group, which renamed it Fun Radio and merged it with the Chic FM networks. The radio moved to 143 avenue Charles-de-Gaulle (Neuilly-sur-Seine) and stayed there until 1999. Most of the Chic FM presenters, including Nagui and Laurent Boyer, were let go.

=== 1988-1992: NRJ-styled format ===
In 1988, Fun Radio had more regional frequencies than any other network: 97 compared to 56 of NRJ, 50 of Kiss FM, 16 of Skyrock and 7 of Hit FM. The station started to focus around the current hits with a format of playing six songs in a row before every advert. The appointment of Benoît Sillard to the station's director in 1989 allowed Fun Radio to find its own style.

In 1991, while staying on Skyrock, Arthur joined Fun Radio. The morning audience increased and the station had a combined audience of 5% with original and impertinent games and delusions on a large network, the "Orgasmotron". Fun was also the most listened-to station for young audience. In 1992, Arthur left Fun Radio for Europe 1.

=== 1992-1996: Rock and provoc ===
In October 1992, to compete with the success of Bonsoir la Planète on Skyrock, Benoît Sillard launched the show Lovin'Fun animated by Le Doc, Christian Spitz, and Difool. Fun Radio became the most listened to radio after 8:00 pm with this free-antenna program by focusing on love and sexuality topics.

In 1993, C.L.T. - Compagnie Luxembourgeoise de Télédiffusion - (RTL Group) held a 30% stake in Fun Radio. The radio then adopted a rock-grunge format and the rest of the schedule was occupied by free-antenna programs. In the spring of 1994, Fun Radio broke its historical audience records with 8.7 points of hearing compared to 10 for NRJ, due to Lovin'Fun as well as the controversy around this show, with the French media regulator CSA having reminded the station following ethical questions and raw remarks.

In January 1995, breakfast host Cauet made a bad joke, comparing holiday clubs and German concentration camps, which later led to his dismissal by Fun Radio.

=== 1996-2000: Reconciliation of RTL ===
In the fall of 1996, Fun Radio reoriented its programming towards R&B, techno, dance and rap music. Thematic or humor shows were focused more like Éric et Ramzy Show, Fun Voyages or Ciné Fun with Arnold and Laurent Weil. Lovin'Fun continued with a new co-host.

On November 3, 1997, Axel Duroux, then CEO of RTL2, took over the presidency of Fun Radio and placed Sam Zniber new antenna director. Lovin'Fun disappeared unreasonably from the airwaves in June 1998. 25% of the staff were fired. In the fall of 1998, a new format appeared: the station changed its historic logo with a pink square which said "Fun" and follow by a blue oval said "radio", very similar to that of RTL and RTL2. Many services - technical, commercial, programming - were shared with those of RTL2, which had almost merged with Fun, when it was called Maxximum. The musical programming went rock-dance. This new image attracted many criticisms from its listeners: the radio loses 1 audience point compared to last spring, until reaching historically low levels.

Gérard de Suresnes, originally a simple listener discovered by Max got his own radio program about debates of two different topics (Les Débats de Gérard). This show aired Thursday night/Friday morning from 1 am to 4 am.

In January 1999, Fun Radio experienced new overhaul. The logo changes for the second time in 6 months. The format changed again to become Groove'n'dance. In the same month, the mixshow Party Fun went on the air. It aired Friday and Saturday nights 10 pm-2 am with Van and Morgan in the mix respectively. 6 months later, the audience climbed dramatically with 6.6% cumulative audience, beating even Skyrock, Europe 2 and Chérie. The audience continued to progress and broke records until 2002. That year, M6 soled the 10% stake it owned to RTL Group (formerly CLT-UFA), which became a 100% shareholder of Fun Radio.

=== 2000-2007: Planet Arthur/Cauet ===
In January 2000, Axel Duroux left RTL Group to head Endemol France. He was replaced by the CEO of RTL, Stéphane Duhamel, who would be replaced the same year by Robin Leproux. In September 2000, Arthur returned to Fun Radio to host Planet Arthur with Manu Levy and Myriam Callas. The mixed show Partyfun went on a time frame between 8 pm and 2 am, and presented by Morgan for both days. He later cut the Saturday night editions in half to mix a new show called Clubin'Fun. In 2002, the radio launched the format of Des hits et du Fun and then beat its second record audience record with 8.1% cumulative audience. In 2004, Sébastien Cauet was announced on Fun Radio to animate the breakfast, which caused a media-legal conflict with the host Arthur who left the station.

In June 2005, the radio adopted a Pop Rhythmic format consisted of electronic-styled music and R&B hits. The slogan of Fun Radio became "Soul & Dance". Max, a 12-year-serving host, left the air on December 23, 2005, and was replaced by Sophie Gaillard. Sam Zniber left the director of Fun Radio and RTL2 at the end of 2006. He was replaced by Jérôme Fouqueray.

A new countdown called Fun Club 40, basically the Club 40 chart, was launched and was live every Saturday evening from 6 pm, straight before Party Fun. The mixed show extended its slots to go from 8 pm-6 am the next morning.

=== 2007-Now: The Dancefloor Sound ===
At the end of 2007, the station changed logo and switched slogan to le son dancefloor, with a changing musical position. Two new shows launched: Funlist, a request show, animated weeknights by Dario, and Eurodance 25, a countdown of Europe's 25 most played songs in clubs, by Gail every Sunday from 7 to 9 pm. In June 2008, Sébastien Cauet left the station to join Virgin Radio. Manu Levy succeeds him successfully with the show Manu dans la radio!. The station was now competing with Skyrock for the place of 2nd best French music station. That same year, Fun Radio became the number one music radio in 20 cities in France (Lyon, Bordeaux, Toulouse, Nancy, Tours, Caen ... - Médialocales July 2011 survey) and the top French station on new digital listening devices.

In May 2011, Manu Levy left Fun Radio to be replaced by Bruno Guillon the following season with the program Bruno dans la radio from 6 am to 9 am.

On 19 August 2013, Lovin'Fun was revived and hosted by Karima Charni, Karel and Christian Spitz. It had its first slogan: "Du sexe, de l'amour et du fun!". Lovin'Fun was followed by a new weekday MiKL-hosted program, #MiKL NO LIMIT. On November 19, 2013, Fun Radio again became France's second most listened to music station with 3,513,000 listeners daily, behind NRJ but ahead of Skyrock (position confirmed in the following poll, where the morning show sets a record).

On September 1, 2014, Jérôme Fouqueray, formerly managing director of the Fun Radio and RTL2 stations, became managing director of the W9 channel. He is replaced by Tristan Jurgensen, who is also director of RTL Net, the digital subsidiary of RTL radio. Tristan Jurgensen imbued Fun Radio with the festivities of Ibiza by relocating some of his shows and bringing DJs from Ibiza to Paris for the Fun Radio Ibiza Experience for one evening annually at the AccorHotels Arena.

Starting in September 2015, Fun Radio started an extension of Party Fun with a Before show for 2 separate hours (at 7 pm and midnight), which sandwiched 2 freeform programs: Lovin'Fun's slot of 8 pm-10pm, and a new Marion & Anne-So: Le Night Show from 10 pm-12 am to attract more female audiences. Party Fun was wider revamped by allowing two different resident DJs to go in the mix weekly, one hour each, between midnight and 2 am. The show's in-house DJs include Adrien Toma and Mico C.

In September 2015, Sunday edition of Party Fun was replaced by Party Fun Deep, and ended at 1 am instead of 6 am. A live overnight show and a 1-hour best-of Bruno dans la radio filled the remaining hours. The show focuses mainly on lounge and chill-out music, and was hosted by Mico C. It ended in mid-December 2019.

== DJs ==
Current guest DJs include Mico C, Quentin Mosimann, Robbie Rivera, Mathieu Bouthier, Laurent Wolf, Dim Chris, Antoine Clamaran and David Vendetta. Other day to day DJs include Bruno Guillon, Mika, Fred, JB Jammes, Marion & Anne So and Karel, Doc & Alice.

Previous DJs have included:

- Cauet: 1994-1995 and 2004–2008
- Difool: 1990–1996
- Max: 1990–2005
- Arthur: 1991-1992 and 2000–2004
- Déborah: 2006–2008
- Sophie: 2006–2008
- Fred Charles: 2005–2006
- Loubna: 2004–2006
- Gaël: 2004–2008
- Abdel (Gopher): 2004–2009

== Voice-overs ==
Recent male voiceovers have included Damien Witecka as the French voice of Leonardo DiCaprio and Tobey Maguire from 2006, and Emmanuel Curtil as the French voice of Jim Carrey and Mike Myers from 1994 to 1998–2002-2005.

Recent female voiceovers have included Audrey lanj since August 2008, and Francine Baudelot: January 2006 - August 2008.

== Slogan history ==
- 1985: Changez d'énergie sans changer de fréquence – Tant qu'il y aura des piles
- 1986: La radio complètement Fun
- 1987: La radio sensations
- 1988: La meilleure radio
- 1990: La radio Fun c'est Fun Radio
- 1992: Toujours et encore plus fort
- 1994: Ouvrons-la
- 1996: Le meilleur mix
- 1997: La radio d'une génération
- 1998: Pour le Fun et pour les tubes
- 1999: Groove, dance, Fun – Fun Radio donne le tempo
- 2001: La première radio Groove'n Dance
- 2002: Des hits & du Fun
- 2004: RnB, Dance, Fun
- 2005-2007: Soul & Dance
- 2007: Le Son Dancefloor

== See also ==
- Fun Radio Belgium, about the Belgian radio station.
