= Paris Première =

French television channel

- Country: France
- Broadcast area: Europe
- Headquarters: Paris

Programming
- Language: French
- Picture format: 1080i HDTV

Ownership
- Owner: Groupe M6
- Sister channels: M6; Gulli; 6ter W9; Téva; M6 Music; Série Club

History
- Launched: 15 December 1986; 39 years ago

Links
- Website: www.6play.fr/pp

Availability

Terrestrial
- TNT: Channel 26

Paris Première (French pronunciation: [paʁi pʁəmjɛʁ]) is a French television channel, available on cable, satellite and the digital terrestrial service, Télévision Numérique Terrestre. It was launched on 15 December 1986 and is now wholly owned by the French media holding company Groupe M6.

== Programming ==
=== Talk show ===
- Ca balance à Paris !, talk show
- Zemmour & Naulleau, satirical talk
- Les Grosses Têtes, comedy talk
- Paris direct, news talk

=== Magazines ===
- Intérieurs, homestyle show
- La Mode, la mode, la mode, fashion show
- Très Très Bon !, culinary show
- Arabelle, art show

=== Reality show ===
- Le Monde des records, entertainment
- Cauchemar en cuisine, US version of Kitchen Nightmares
- Hôtel Hell, US version of Hotel Hell
- Matilda and the Ramsay Bunch – UK series

=== Series ===
- Boardwalk Empire
- Modern Family
- Caméra Café
- Lie to Me
- My Name Is Earl
- Blue Bloods
- Supernatural
- The L.A. Complex
- The Killing
- Silk Stalkings
- Sex and the City
- Kaamelott, French creation

=== Animated ===
- Family Guy
- The Flintstones

=== Award shows and Events ===
French broadcasts in France for the following:

- Miss Universe
- Miss World
- Tony Awards

== Logos ==
25 September 1995 – 20 September 2011

21 September 2011 – present
