= Téva =

- Country: France
- Broadcast area: France
- Headquarters: Neuilly-sur-Seine, France

Programming
- Language: French
- Picture format: 576i (16:9 SDTV); 1080i (HDTV)

Ownership
- Owner: Groupe M6
- Sister channels: M6; Gulli; 6ter Paris Première; W9; M6 Music; Série Club

History
- Launched: 6 October 1996; 29 years ago

Links
- Website: www.6play.fr/teva

Téva is a French pay television channel with a female focus, belonging to Groupe M6. Téva has been broadcast in 16:9 since 10 November 2009 and in HD quality since 8 November 2011.

== History ==
In April 1995, Laurence Aupetit was appointed as Project Development Director for the new thematic channel, which was then called Vivre. Following differences of opinion, she resigned and was replaced by Mike Le Bas. Téva is a mini generalist digital television channel available on cable, satellite, and ADSL in France. The core target is the housewife under the age of 50. Since its inception, it has been aimed at an essentially female audience with children. It is the first channel to have chosen this audience niche. It was created on 6 October 1996 by the M6 Group, Marie Claire and Hachette Filipacchi (which owned the magazine Elle). It is fully owned by the Groupe M6 since 2007.

On 14 November 2010, Téva broadcast the first episodes of the Cougar Town series, which made the best launch for a series broadcast on its airwaves.

Téva celebrated its 15th anniversary in 2011. To celebrate this anniversary the channel offered special evenings from 15 to 29 June 2011. Téva modified its on-air look on 2 March 2014.

The channel achieves record audiences with the series Drop Dead Diva, Devious Maids, Gran Hotel and The Good Wife. The successful programs remain Téva Déco or Magnifique by Cristina.

Since November 2016, the channel has also been available as a subscription via the 6play (now M6+) site and application, in live and replay.
