= Jacques Danois =

Belgian reporter, writer

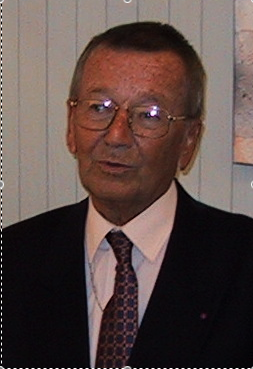
- Le Désarroi de Confucius book signing
- Born: Jacques Maricq; 27 September 1927; Brussels, Belgium
- Died: 20 September 2008 (aged 81); Carpentras (Vaucluse), France
- Occupations: Journalist, writer
- Spouse: Yolande
- Children: Etienne, Caroline
- Website: https://jacquesdanois.blogspot.com

Jacques Danois, pseudonym of Jacques Maricq (11 September 1927 – 20 September 2008), was a reporter and writer who was director of information at Unicef.

He was born in Brussels. Upon retirement, he became secretary general, then vice-president, of the World Association of Children's Friends. He died in Carpentras, Vaucluse, France.

== Published works ==
- Un homme appelé Laurent, Pierre De Méyère, 1965
- Mon frère Bantu, Pierre De Méyère, 1966
- Envoyé special au Vietnam, Pierre De Méyère, 1968
- Les Moineaux de Saigon, (Photos Philippe Franchini), Jules Verbeek, 1969
- Le Sang du jasmin, Pierre De Méyère, 1973
- Au clair de la Terre, poèmes illustrés par Dom, Pierre De Méyère, 1973
- L'autocar Chinois, Pierre De Méyère, 1974
- La fleur de velours noir, Pierre De Méyère, 1975
- La Pierre habitée, (Illustré par Serge Creuz), Pierre De Méyère.
- Les Amis du bout du monde, Pierre De Méyère, 1976
- Vents du Nord, Prométhée, 1977
- Lali, Pierre De Méyère, 1978
- Mordre de la brume, Pierre De Méyère, 1978
- Regards brûlés, Saint-Germain-des-Près, 1978
- Défiance, (Illustré par Caroline Maricq), Erawan, 1980
- La rue des Algues, Pierre De Méyère, 1980
- L'Hôtel du Nouveau Nuage, (Illustré par Caroline Maricq), Pierre De Méyère, 1981
- La terre gourmande, RTL édition, 1986
- La nuit des chiens, RTL – La Palme (et fondation Jacques Brel), 1988
- Printemps blessés, Les Dossiers d'Aquitaine, 1990 ISBN 2-905212-09-8
- Aguigui, Les Dossiers d'Aquitaine, 1991 ISBN 2-905212-11-X
- Pourtant il ne neige pas, Les Dossiers d'Aquitaine, 1992 ISBN 2-905212-14-4
- Moisson fragiles. Les enfants du docteur Hoa, Collection "Les Enfants du Fleuve", Éditions Fayard, 1994
- Passeport pour l'amitié, Collection "Les Enfants du Fleuve, Éditions Fayard, 1995
- Vietnam, un certain renouveau?, (Illustré par Caroline Maricq), Les Dossiers d'Aquitaine, 1996 ISBN 2-905212-24-1
- Cicatrices, Les Dossiers d'Aquitaine, 1997 ISBN 2-905212-33-0
- Han Suyin aux multiples splendeurs, Les Dossiers d'Aquitaine, 1998 ISBN 2-905212-58-6
- Frères dans la rizière, Éditions Fayard, 1998
- Alcooloflash, Les Dossiers d'Aquitaine, 2000 ISBN 2-905212-97-7
- Le désarroi de Confucius, Éditions Fayard, 2000 2000 ISBN 978-2-213-60810-5
- Une récolte de lunes, Éditions du Jubilé, 2003
- Le Cahier, Les Dossiers d'Aquitaine, 2006 ISBN 2-84622-133-2
- Jardin public, (théâtre), Les Dossiers d'Aquitaine, 2006 ISBN 2-84622-134-0
- Eclats de mémoire, Les Dossiers d'Aquitaine, 2005 ISBN 2-84622-112-X
- Rizières, savanes et garrigues, Les Dossiers d'Aquitaine, ISBN 2-84622-141-3
- L'ânesse blanche, Les Dossiers d'Aquitaine, 2006 ISBN 2-84622-144-8
- Micro au poing, Patrick Robin, 2006 ISBN 2-35228-007-9
- Tsunami sur l'enfance, Les Dossiers d'Aquitaine, 2007 ISBN 978-2-84622-154-2
- Mes vieux camarades de Jésus, Les Dossiers d'Aquitaine, 2008 ISBN 978-2-84622-155-9

=== National Honours ===
- Belgium :
  - 1999 : Officer of the Order of Leopold

=== Foreign Honours ===
- Monaco :
  - 2001 : Chevalier of the Order of Saint-Charles
