= Pierre-Luc Séguillon =

French journalist (1940–2010)

- Born: 13 September 1940; Nancy, France
- Died: 31 October 2010 (aged 70); Paris, France
- Occupation: Television journalist
- Employer: LCI

Pierre-Luc Séguillon (13 September 1940 – 31 October 2010) was a French columnist and journalist.
