= M6 Music =

French music video television channel

- Country: France
- Headquarters: Neuilly-sur-Seine, France

Programming
- Language: French
- Picture format: 576i (16:9 SDTV); 1080i (HDTV)

Ownership
- Owner: Groupe M6
- Sister channels: M6; W9; Gulli; 6ter RFM TV; MCM Top

History
- Launched: 5 March 1998; 28 years ago
- Founder: Louis-Alexis de Gemini
- Former names: M6 Music Hits (2005–2012)

Links
- Website: www.6play.fr

M6 Music is a French music video television channel owned and operated by Groupe M6. Launched on 5 March 1998, it broadcasts mainly in France.

== History ==
On 5 March 1998, M6 Music was launched by Groupe M6 as its second musical channel after Fun TV the previous year, to enhance the offering of the TPS satellite bouquet of which it had just increased his share to 25%, to counter MCM which preferred to remain exclusive to its rival CanalSatellite.

In 2003, the CSA granted M6 Music a license to be broadcast on the DTT platform. M6 would rather launch its DTT channel as W9, while M6 Music was spun off into two additional pay-TV channels for TPS with M6 Music Rock and M6 Music Black on 10 January 2005. At the same time of W9's launch on 31 March 2005, M6 Music became M6 Music Hits.

Its sister channel Fun TV was closed on 31 December 2008, and M6 Music Rock was replaced by M6 Music Club dedicated to dance music on 20 January 2009.

On 1 June 2012, M6 Music Hits returned to M6 Music, after playing La terre est ronde from Orelsan.

In late 2012, its interactive service M6 Music Player was launched exclusively on Canalsat, which launched an app early 2014.

On 4 January 2015, its deficitary sister channels were shut down. In December 2015, M6 Music Player was replaced by a M6 Music section of the 6play service available via different providers.

In 2018, M6 Music celebrated its 20 years with a concert and changed its logo. In 2020, Gédéon made a new branding for both M6 Music and M6.

M6 Music is also the name of the musical programme airing during night time on M6.
