= W9 (TV channel) =

French national television network

- Country: France
- Headquarters: Neuilly-sur-Seine

Programming
- Language: French
- Picture format: 1080i HDTV (downscaled to 576i for the SD feed)

Ownership
- Owner: Groupe M6
- Sister channels: M6; Gulli; 6ter Paris Première; Téva; M6 Music; Série Club

History
- Launched: 31 March 2005; 21 years ago

Links
- Website: www.w9.fr

Availability

Terrestrial
- TNT: Channel 9

W9 (pronounced [dubləve nœf]) is a French television network available through digital terrestrial television TNT, satellite and ADSL. It is a subsidiary of the Groupe M6; the name W9 has been selected for the channel because "W9" is a mirror written equivalent of "M6", and also as it was the nation's ninth broadcast network.

== History ==
The name W9 was invented by Les Inconnus in the early 90s with a sketch that spoofed M6's music programming at the time, with the logo being a rotated version of M6's. The sketch portrays the interaction between Roxane (played by Pascal Légitimus) with an American accent who wants to ask Michel (played by Bernard Campan) about the name of the excerpt of the song that was being played.

Before getting a terrestrial license, W9 was M6 Music, a satellite channel launched on 1 March 1998. The channel was renamed M6 Music Hits on the day W9 launched. W9 is one of the first channels of TNT France (French DVB-T).

== Logos ==
W9's second logo from 2005 to 2010

== W9 HD ==
The channel has been available in HD since August 1, 2011.

== Share ==
	January	February	March	April	May	June	July	August	September	October	November	December	Annual average
2007					0.8%	1.0%	0.9%	0.9%	1.1%	1.1%	1.2%	1.3%	0.9%
2008	1.4%	1.6%	1.6%	1.7%	1.8%	1.9%	1.5%	1.5%	2.0%	2.1%	2.3%	2.2%	1.8%
2009	2.3%	2.2%	2.3%	2.4%	2.4%	2.4%	2.2%	2.6%	2.5%	2.8%	2.8%	2.9%	2.5%
2010	2.7%	2.7%	2.8%	3.0%	3.0%	3.0%	3.0%	3.0%	3.1%	3.0%	3.1%	3.2%	3.0%
2011	3.4%	3.3%	3.1%	3.2%	3.1%	3.1%	3.2%	3.8%	3.4%	3.5%	3.6%	3.5%	3.4%
2012	2.9%	3.2%	3.0%	3.2%	3.1%	3.3%	3.3%	3.3%	3.5%	3.6%	3.3%	3.1%	3.2%
2013	3.4%	3.3%	2.8%	2.9%	2.9%	3.0%	3.0%	3.1%	2.8%				

== Frequency ==
- Eutelsat 5 West A (ex-Atlantic Bird 3)
- Eutelsat 9A (ex-Eurobird 9A)
- Eutelsat Hot Bird 13A (ex-Hotbird 6)
- Astra 1N
