= Groupe M6 =

French media broadcaster

Métropole Télévision SA
- Trade name: M6 Group
- Native name: Groupe M6
- Type: Public
- Traded as: Euronext Paris: MMT; CAC Mid 60 Component
- Industry: Media
- Founded: 1 March 1987; 39 years ago
- Headquarters: Neuilly-sur-Seine, France
- Key people: Nicolas De Tavernost (ex-CEO)
- Products: Television; Broadcasting; Production; Websites; Media investments
- Revenue: 1,315,600,000 (2023)
- Net income: 237,100,000 (2023)
- Owners: RTL Group (48.26%); CMA CGM (10.25%)
- Website: www.groupem6.fr

Métropole Télévision SA, commonly known as M6 Group (French: Groupe M6), is a French media holding company. It was formed around the commercial television channel M6, launched in March 1987 by the CLT (RTL Télévision) and La Lyonnaise des Eaux.

In addition to its audiovisual and digital media presence, some of the group's television channels are operated (including M6, W9, 6ter, Paris Première, Téva, Série Club) radio stations (RTL, RTL2 and Fun Radio), and film and television production and distribution companies. The company has also been presenting information and services on the Internet, including online video and computer companies. Since 1999, the group has also diversified into publishing, music and show production, distance selling, and sport with the Football Club of the Girondins de Bordeaux.

In May 2021, M6 Group and TF1 Group announced that they had begun negotiations for a proposed merger. On 16 September 2022, the merger was officially abandoned. On 22 September 2022, Thomas Rabe, CEO of RTL Group's parent company, Bertelsmann confirmed that Groupe M6 was up for sale, after the failed merger with TF1 Group. On 3 October 2022, RTL Group confirmed that they would not be selling their stake in Groupe M6.

== Assets ==
=== Television ===
Channel	Description	Stake	Launched	Acquired
M6	Broadcast network	100%	1 March 1987 (replaced TV6)	
W9	Youth entertainment and musical channel launched for DTT	100%	31 March 2005	
6ter	Generalist family channel launched for DTT	100%	12 December 2012	
Paris Première	Generalist and cultural interest Pay-TV channel Available on Pay-DTT, with FTA programs	100%	15 December 1986	6 May 2004
Téva	Pay-TV channel targeting a female audience	100%	6 October 1996	2007
M6 Music	Musical pay-TV channel	100%	5 March 1998	
Série Club	Pay-TV channel dedicated to TV series	50% TF1 Group, 50% M6 Group	8 March 1993	
M6 Suisse	Swiss subfeed, available in free-to-air on satellite	100% (advertising window operated by Goldbach Media)	2 October 2001	
W9 Suisse	Swiss subfeed, available in free-to-air on satellite	100% (advertising window operated by Goldbach Media)	2 August 2011	
6ter Suisse	Swiss subfeed, available in free-to-air on satellite	100% (advertising window operated by Goldbach Media)	2014	

==== International ====
Channel	Description	Launched	Acquired
M6 International	International version of M6, outside Europe	2019	

==== Former channels ====
All these channels used to be on Pay-TV.

Channel	Description	Stake	Launched	Ceased	Acquired
Fun TV	Music channels	100%	22 February 1997	31 December 2008	
M6 Music Black	Music channels	100%	10 January 2005	4 January 2015	
M6 Music Club	Music channels	100%	20 January 2009	4 January 2015	
M6 Music Rock	Music channels	100%	10 January 2005	20 January 2009	
M6 Boutique	TV shopping channels	100% (via Home Shopping Service)	19 May 1998	1 July 2020	
Best of Shopping	TV shopping channels	100% (via Home Shopping Service)	1 October 2003	1 July 2020	
Girondins TV	Channel dedicated to FC Girondins de Bordeaux	100% (via FC des Girondins de Bordeaux)	14 August 2008	30 October 2018	
TF6	Generalist family channel	50% TF1 Group, 50% M6 Group	18 December 2000	31 December 2014	
Telekanal Deda Moroza	Russian children channel, available every year for the Christmas and holiday season	1 December 2013	2019		

=== Radio ===
The Groupe M6 acquired RTL France on 1 October 2017, from its main shareholder RTL Group.

Radio	Description	Stake	Launched	Acquired
RTL	Generalist	100%	15 March 1933	1 October 2017
RTL2	Pop-rock music	100%	6 January 1992	1 October 2017
Fun Radio	Youth-oriented and dance music	100%	2 October 1985	1 October 2017

=== Video platforms ===
On 19 March 2008, M6 launched its first catchup service, M6 Replay. On 4 November 2013, M6 Replay, W9 Replay and 6ter Replay were merged into 6play. In late 2017, RTL radios joined 6play. 6play was declined in Belgium and Croatia as RTL Play, and in Hungary as RTL Most.

On 14 May 2024, 6play became M6+ and is now using the same platform as Germany’s RTL+ as they are developed by streaming technology company Bedrock co-owned by Groupe M6 and RTL Group.

Service	Description	Stake	Launched	Acquired
M6+	Catchup, live TV, radio and video on demand. Available in Germany and Hungary as RTL+	100% (via M6 Web)	4 November 2013	
Gulli Replay	Catchup, available on TV providers, and Gulli mobile app Gulli is also available on M6+.	100% (via Jeunesse TV)	April 2010	2 September 2019
Gulli Max	Children SVOD service, available in OTT, as the premium option on Gulli mobile app, on Prime Video Channels, and various providers, included in some offers such as the Famille bouquet of Canal+	100% (via Jeunesse TV)	2014	2 September 2019

M6 Group was a shareholder of the streaming service Salto as a joint-venture with TF1 Group and France Télévisions, active from 2020 to 2023.

=== Film ===
- M6 Films, film co-production
- M6 Studio, film production
- Société Nouvelle de Cinématographie (SNC), film catalog
- SND, formerly known as Société Nouvelle de Distribution or SND Films, film distribution and production
- M6 Vidéo, home video distribution division
- Studio 89 Productions, formerly known as W9 Productions, television production
- C. Productions, television news production
- M6 Formats, distribution arm of Studio 89's original programmes
- Golden Network, digital content
