= Toothpaste (disambiguation) =

Toothpaste is a paste or gel dentifrice that is used to clean and maintain the aesthetics of teeth.

Toothpaste may also refer to:

== Entertainment ==
=== Music ===
- "Toothpaste", a 1982 song composed by Shankar–Ganesh, sung by S. P. Balasubrahmanyam and S. Janaki, from Ranga (1982 film)
- "Toothpaste", a 1996 song by Something for Kate, from the album ....The Answer to Both Your Questions
- "Toothpaste", a 2015 song composed by Ilan Eshkeri, from the 2015 soundtrack album of the 2014 film Still Alice
- "Toothpaste", a 2023 single by Rhodes (singer)
- "Toothpaste", a 2026 single by Eleventyseven

=== Television ===
- "Toothpaste", a 1995 episode of the British children's series Come Outside
- "Toothpaste", a 2003 episode of the Philippine drama series Maalaala Mo Kaya
- "Toothpaste!", a 2002 episode of the American children's series Oobi
- "The Toothpaste", a 2016 episode of the French animated series Zig & Sharko
- "The Toothpaste", a 2017 episode of the Russian animated series The Fixies
- "4-Komasan: Toothpaste", a 2019 episode of the 2019 Japanese animated series Yo-kai Watch!

=== Web media ===
- Toothpaste, a character from the sixth season of Battle for Dream Island, an animated web series
- "Toothpaste", a 2024 episode of the British web series Peppa Pig Tales
- "Toothpaste", a 2024 episode of the podcast The Complete Guide to Everything

== Other uses ==
- Drew (webcomic artist), an American author also known as Drew Toothpaste
- Elephant's toothpaste, a hot foamy substance caused by the quick decomposition of hydrogen peroxide
- RP-Hapee Toothpaste, a basketball team that played in the 2002 PBA Governors' Cup in the Philippines

== See also ==
- List of toothpaste brands
- Toothpaste tube theory
