= Ilan Eshkeri =

British composer (born 1977)

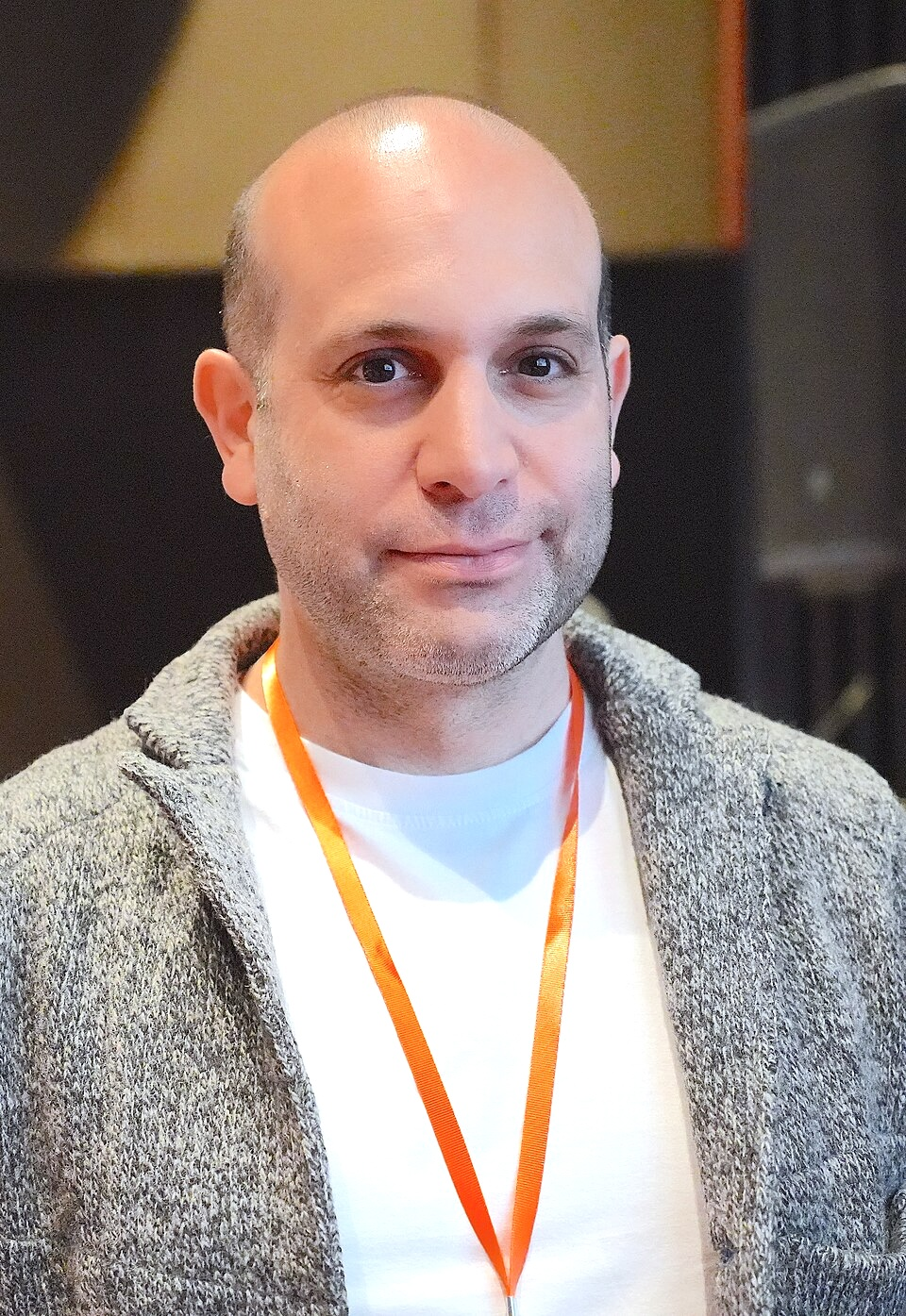
- Eshkeri at the Los Angeles Times Festival of Books in 2025

Background information
- Born: 7 April 1977 (age 49); London, England
- Genres: Contemporary Classical, rock, pop, electronic
- Occupation: Composer,
- Instruments: Violin, guitar, piano
- Years active: 2000–present
- Website: www.ilaneshkeri.com

Ilan Eshkeri (born 7 April, 1977) is a British composer known for his concert music, film scores and artist collaborations.

== Early life ==
Eshkeri was born in London. During his childhood, he learned to play the violin and guitar. Eshkeri attended Leeds University, where he studied music and English literature. During this time he also apprenticed with film composers Edward Shearmur, Michael Kamen and music producer Steve McLaughlin.

== Career ==
His extensive catalogue of film and TV scores include Still Alice, Stardust, The Young Victoria, Layer Cake (film), Shaun The Sheep and David Attenborough's Natural History Museum Alive. Eshkeri has collaborated with artists David Gilmour, Annie Lennox, Take That, KT Tunstall, Tim Wheeler, Amon Tobin and Nick Hodgson (Kaiser Chiefs) among others. He recently worked with the European Space Agency on music for astronaut Tim Peake's Principia mission. In addition, he has conducted his own works at The Louvre in Paris, the Rudolfinum in Prague and conducted a specially commissioned work called Reliquary for the Burberry 2016 Autumn fashion show in London.

In 2012, Eshkeri was commissioned to write a composition for a photo exhibition at The Louvre in Paris, where he conducted a 90-piece orchestra in the Tuileries Garden. The twelve-part tone poem titled "Through My Window" was recorded in Abbey Road Studios by the London Metropolitan Orchestra, the 46 minutes composition played alongside the exhibition.

In 2014, Eshkeri composed music for the video game The Sims 4 as well as several of its expansion packs.

2017 saw Eshkeri compose a ballet with famed photographer and director David LaChapelle and ballet dancer Sergei Polunin titled Narcissus and Echo. The performance debuted March 14, 2017 at the Sadler's Wells Theatre in London.

His more recent show, ‘Space Station Earth’ depicts the emotional journey of astronauts traveling to the International Space Station. Crafted with support from the European Space Agency and NASA. This six-year project involved Eshkeri creating a Synth-Pop album and directing a film in triptych, which sets the backdrop for the live performance. The Show was performed at The Royal Albert Hall in 2022.

== Discography ==
=== Theatrical films ===
Year	Title	Director(s)	Notes
2000	The Quarry Men	Toby White	—N/a
2003	Trinity	Gary Boulton-Brown	—N/a
2004	Layer Cake	Matthew Vaughn	Composed with Lisa Gerrard
2007	Hannibal Rising	Peter Webber	Composed with Shigeru Umebayashi
2007	Straightheads	Dan Reed	—N/a
2007	Strength and Honour	Mark Mahon	—N/a
2007	Stardust	Matthew Vaughn	—N/a
2007	Virgin Territory	David Leland	—N/a
2008	The Disappeared	Johnny Kevorkian	—N/a
2008	Telstar: The Joe Meek Story	Nick Moran	—N/a
2009	The Young Victoria	Jean-Marc Vallée	—N/a
2009	Ninja Assassin	James McTeigue	—N/a
2009	From Time to Time	Julian Fellowes	—N/a
2010	Centurion	Neil Marshall	—N/a
2010	Kick-Ass	Matthew Vaughn	Composed with John Murphy, Henry Jackman, and Marius de Vries
2010	The Kid	Nick Moran	—N/a
2011	Knuckle	Ian Palmer	—N/a
2011	Blooded	Edward Boase	—N/a
2011	Coriolanus	Ralph Fiennes	—N/a
2011	Blitz	Elliott Lester	—N/a
2011	Retreat	Carl Tibbetts	—N/a
2011	Johnny English Reborn	Oliver Parker	—N/a
2012	Spike Island	Mat Whitecross	—N/a
2012	Ashes	Mat Whitecross	—N/a
2013	I Give It a Year	Dan Mazer	—N/a
2013	Austenland	Jerusha Hess	—N/a
2013	Justin and the Knights of Valour	Manuel Sicilia	—N/a
2013	Alan Partridge: Alpha Papa	Declan Lowney	—N/a
2013	47 Ronin	Carl Rinsch	—N/a
2013	The Invisible Woman	Ralph Fiennes	—N/a
2014	Get Santa	Christopher Smith	—N/a
2014	Still Alice	Richard Glatzer and Wash Westmoreland	—N/a
2014	Black Sea	Kevin Macdonald	—N/a
2015	Shaun the Sheep Movie	Mark Burton; Richard Starzak	—N/a
2015	Don Verdean	Jared Hess	—N/a
2015	Survivor	James McTeigue	—N/a
2015	Collide	Eran Creevy	—N/a
2016	The Exception	David Leveaux	—N/a
2016	Swallows and Amazons	Philippa Lowthorpe	—N/a
2018	Dancer	Steven Cantor	—N/a
2018	Measure of a Man	Jim Loach	Composed with Tim Wheeler
2018	The White Crow	Ralph Fiennes	—N/a
2018	Farming	Adewale Akinnuoye-Agbaje	—N/a
2023	The Unlikely Pilgrimage of Harold Fry	Hettie Macdonald	—N/a
2024	Super/Man: The Christopher Reeve Story	Ian Bonhôte and Peter Ettedgui	—N/a

=== Short films ===
Year	Title	Director(s)	Notes
2004	The Banker	Hattie Dalton	—N/a
2008	Cinco de Mayo	Giles Greenwood	—N/a
2009	Attempt Seven	Gez Medinger and Robin Schmidt	—N/a
2011	The Snowman and the Snowdog	Hilary Audus	Composed with Andy Burrows
2014	Once Upon a Time in London	Joséphine de La Baume	—N/a
2015	The Gift	Stu Weiner	—N/a

=== Television films ===
Year	Title	Director	Notes
2003	Colosseum: Rome's Arena of Death	Tilman Remme	—N/a
2004	Dark Kingdom: The Dragon King	Uli Edel	—N/a
2005	Ape to Man	Nic Young	—N/a
2006	The First Emperor	Nic Young	—N/a
2009	Micro Men	Saul Metzstein	—N/a
2011	Eric and Ernie	Jonny Campbell	—N/a
2012	Planet Dinosaur: Ultimate Killers	Nigel Paterson	—N/a
2014	David Attenborough's Natural History Museum Alive	Daniel M. Smith	—N/a
2017	Judi Dench: My Passion for Trees	Harvey Lilley	—N/a

=== Television series ===
Year	Title	Notes
2009	Trial & Retribution	3 episodes
2009	Waking the Dead	6 episodes
2010–2012	Strike Back	Series 1–3, 26 episodes
2011	Richard Hammond's Journey to the Centre of the Planet	Two episodes
2011	Planet Dinosaur	Episode: "Lost World"
2014	Fleming: The Man Who Would Be Bond	4 episodes
2015–2016	Great Barrier Reef	3 episodes
2016	Doctor Thorne	3 episodes
2017–2019	Riviera	19 episodes
2018	Informer	6 episodes
2019	The Athena	5 episodes
2020	A Perfect Planet	6 episodes
2022–present	SAS: Rogue Heroes	12 episodes
2025–present	MobLand	10 episodes Composed with Matt Bellamy

=== Video games ===
Year	Title	Notes
2014	The Sims 4	—N/a
2020	Ghost of Tsushima	Composed with Shigeru Umebayashi

=== Audiobooks ===
Year	Title	Director	Notes
2024	George Orwell's 1984	—N/a	Composed with Matt Bellamy

== Awards and nominations ==
Year	Award	Category	Nominated work	Result	Ref.
2005	World Soundtrack Awards	Discovery of the Year	Layer Cake	Nominated	
2007	International Film Music Critics Association	Breakthrough Composer of the Year	Stardust	Won	
2007	International Film Music Critics Association	Best Original Score for a Fantasy/Science Fiction/Horror Film	Stardust	Nominated	
2008	Malibu Film Festival	Best Soundtrack	Strength and Honour	Won	
2010	Ivor Novello Awards	Best Original Film Score	The Young Victoria	Nominated	
2020	British Academy Games Awards	Music	Ghost of Tsushima	Nominated	
2020	D.I.C.E. Awards	Outstanding Achievement in Original Music Composition	Ghost of Tsushima	Won	
2020	Society of Composers & Lyricists	Outstanding Original Score for Interactive Media	Ghost of Tsushima	Nominated	
2024	Critics' Choice Documentary Awards	Best Score	Super/Man: The Christopher Reeve Story	Won	
2024	Hollywood Music in Media Awards	Score – Documentary	Super/Man: The Christopher Reeve Story	Won	
2024	International Film Music Critics Association	Best Original Score for a Documentary	Super/Man: The Christopher Reeve Story	Nominated	
2025	Primetime Emmy Awards	Outstanding Music Composition for a Documentary Series or Special (Original Dramatic Score)	Super/Man: The Christopher Reeve Story	Nominated	
