= Zig & Sharko =

French animated comedy series produced by Xilam Animation

- Genre: Comedy; Slapstick
- Created by: Olivier Jean-Marie
- Directed by: Olivier Jean-Marie (season 1); Hugo Gittard (seasons 1–2); Andrés Fernandez (seasons 2–3); Khalil Ben Naamane (season 3); Cédric Dietsch (season 3); Yani Ouabdesselam (season 4); Nicolas Bougard (season 4)
- Voices of: Edwige Lemoine (Marina, season 4 onwards)
- Composers: Fabien Nataf (season 1); Alain Mouysset (season 1); Vincent Artaud (seasons 2–present)
- Country of origin: France
- No. of seasons: 4
- No. of episodes: 104 (312 segments) (list of episodes)

Production
- Executive producer: Marc du Pontavice
- Producer: Marc du Pontavice
- Running time: 22 minutes (7 minutes per segment)
- Production company: Xilam Animation

Original release
- Network: TF1/Canal+
- Release: December 21, 2010 – June 14, 2011
- Network: Gulli/M6
- Release: February 15, 2016 – present

Related
- The Adventures of Bernie

Zig & Sharko (French: Zig et Sharko) is a French animated slapstick comedy television series, created and directed by Olivier Jean-Marie, and produced by Xilam Animation for French networks, including Canal+, Gulli and M6. The series focuses on the adventures of Zig, a brown hyena who is often aided by a hermit crab named Bernie, and Sharko, a great white shark, over their conflicts regarding the mermaid Marina.

Much of the series is inspired from classic cartoon series such as Wile E. Coyote and the Road Runner and Tom and Jerry, with animators employing the use of silent comedy for each plot - characters do not speak, instead conveying thoughts and feelings through gestures, emotional expressions, and unintelligible vocalization. After the first season, additional minor characters were created, most based on marine creatures such as dolphins, octopuses and fish, whilst the setting and main characters received updates and changes to their background.

Zig & Sharko was first broadcast on December 21, 2010, and has featured to date four seasons with 104 half-hour episodes. The series later was distributed globally after episodes were put online on YouTube by Xilam, with English titles and credits. A spin-off series, The Adventures of Bernie, was created by Xilam and broadcast in 2021.

On January 14, 2026, it was announced that a 5th and 6th season was in production and it is stated to be released in 2027 and 2028.

== Premise ==
The major characters in the series (from right to left, as of the third season): Bernie (in the pool), Zig, Marina, and Sharko. The cartoon series employ slapstick comedy similar to other cartoons, such as Wile E. Coyote and Road Runner

The series focuses on the exploits and adventures of a group of characters – Zig, a brown hyena; Sharko, a great white shark; Marina, a mermaid with red hair; and Bernie, a hermit crab. Much of the stories of each episode revolve around an eternal war over Marina between Zig, who attempts to capture her to eat her, and Sharko, who loves her and acts as her bodyguard against Zig's various plans. The show itself draws inspiration for its plot and slapstick humor from the cartoons of Wile E. Coyote and the Road Runner, in that Zig often makes use of various items or concocts plans based on things he witnesses with Sharko and Marina, but is often foiled in the process by Sharko, bad luck, or a combination of both. Although the pair are enemies to each other because of their constant battles and grudges, they are also good friends, akin to the relationship of Tom and Jerry. Alongside the main characters, the show is frequently populated by minor background characters, many of whom are animals and aquatic creatures that, alongside Zig and Sharko, are portrayed as anthropomorphic beings.

Throughout the first season, much of the plots revolve around the oceans surrounding a tropical volcanic island, in which Marina often spends the day sitting on a rocky pinnacle off the coast during the day, while residing in an underwater home that she shares with Sharko. In the second season, the plots shifted to the island itself, including its beaches, volcano, and jungle, with some changes for the main characters – Marina takes residence in an ornate, life-sized sandcastle, built by Sharko; Zig and Bernie live with a cargo plane pilot in his crashed plane within the jungle; and Sharko operates as a lifeguard for the aquatic lifeforms who frequent the beaches. In the third season, the main characters and the island's inhabitants move onto a cruise ship to travel the oceans, where much of the season's plots take place. In the fourth season, the main characters dock the ship back to the island where Marina is granted magical sentient sandals, which transforms her into a human with superhuman legs when worn, before resuming their adventures (across both the island, the ship, and the oceans equally).

== Characters ==
None of the characters in the series speak; a form of gibberish speech is sometimes used, but most interactions involve hand signals and body language to convey what a character is thinking about. The show's main characters include:

- Zig is an anthropomorphic brown hyena - naughty but very, very hungry, and best friends with Bernie. He will eat anything, especially Marina, who he frequently plots to capture for this purpose, but his schemes are often foiled by Sharko. He is often desperate and eager to eat Marina on sight, but is no better outside of his main motive. He has a comically dry and wheezy voice, and is romantically uninterested in anyone. In the episode "Viking Love", a Viking Woman is seen falling in love with Zig, and in another episode titled "Bad Hair Day", a dark-purple octopus can be seen falling in love with Zig in his disguise. Both of these relationships were unapproved of by Zig.
- Sharko is an anthropomorphic great white shark, who appears brutish and tough, but is also extremely dorky with a heart of gold. He loves Marina and will do anything to protect her from harm, which include Zig's schemes. He is portrayed as muscular and very strong: due to that, he has visible defined abs, a big chest with huge pecs (without nipples), and giant biceps. He is also a fan of table tennis. In spite of his devotion to Marina, he can sometimes occasionally cause trouble for himself. During the first few episodes of the series, he was unable to get around on the island and could only swim in the ocean. Later on, he is capable of walking on dry land using his tail fins as feet.
- Marina is a mermaid with red hair, who is good-natured, naive, bubbly and romantic – intrigued by anything new she encounters. She maintains a positive relationship with the other characters in the show (including Zig), although this makes her quite naive to Zig's intentions to eat her. She is portrayed as wearing a small living sea star in her hair, whom has a crush on Bernie. Marina is also capable of walking on her tail (using her fins as feet). In season 4, she is gifted with magical sandals that grant her human legs and stretching abilities.
- Bernie is a red anthropomorphic hermit crab, and Zig's best friend. He often collaborates in Zig's schemes to capture Marina, though holds no grudge against her or Sharko, in reality. He is often denoted as being quite smart, and capable of coming to the rescue when needed. He also has a crush on the Sea Star on Marina's head. He has his own spin-off series called The Adventures of Bernie.

Aside from the main characters, various episodes feature a variety of background and minor characters to the stories – jungle animals, aquatic lifeforms, and various human characters – in the first season, one of these human characters is portrayed as a Japanese cargo ship captain, who, as a running gag, frequently crashes his ship into the island and is forced to return home with a rubber dingy. Throughout the first season, several episodes featured the supporting character of Neptune, based on the mythological Roman god of the sea and portrayed as a vain, muscular merman with numerous killer whale henchmen, who competed with Sharko for Marina's love, despite her disliking him. He once trapped Marina with a sketchy contract. Marina despises him and often has to rely on Sharko and Zig to keep him at bay. The second season introduces Poseidon, portrayed as a muscular, elderly merman, who served as Marina's adopted father in the episode "Father in Law", and an amnesiac human ATR 72 cargo plane pilot who often exhibits the behavior of a monkey due to his condition – the episode "Back to Civilization" revolves around a flashback, where the pilot has met up with actual simians. Also introduced in season 2 was a dark and evil wizard who lives inside the volcano on the island named Hades, with a cold flame on the top of his head. He possesses a crush on Marina and constantly attempts to seduce her, but always fails due to bad habits, hygiene, terrifying her and/or nastiness. When that fails, he attempts to use his many artifacts of dark magic to take Marina by force. He is considered a mutual enemy by Zig and Sharko, and his appearances usually kill enough conflict between the two to have them team up in order to protect Marina from him. Also, the second season introduces a new running gag, where another cargo plane suffers unfortunate rear cargo door button malfunction and frequently causing several crates to be ejected into the land.

== Episodes ==
Season	Segments	Episodes	Originally released		
Season	Segments	Episodes	First released	Last released	Network
1	78	26	December 21, 2010	June 14, 2011	Canal+
2	78	26	February 15, 2016	August 8, 2016	Gulli
3	78	26	September 2, 2019	March 21, 2020	Gulli
4	78	26	November 6, 2023	April 16, 2024	Gulli; M6

== Production and development ==
The idea for the series emerged from a conversation between Xilam producer Marc du Pontavice and Olivier Jean-Marie, the director of Oggy and the Cockroaches. Du Pontavice suggested a new series featuring the same style of slapstick and silent humor found in Oggy, and Jean-Marie proposed a concept involving a mermaid, a shark, and a hyena. A fourth animal character was considered when du Pontavice felt that Zig was somewhat lonely facing the duo of the shark and the mermaid; he then asked Jean-Marie to create a small sidekick, which led to the creation of Bernie.

In 2009, the television group Canal+ decided to develop pilot episodes for nine out of 135 animation projects received, including Zig & Sharko, for television broadcast during the 2010–11 season. A development budget of 6 to 6,5 million euros (6.77 to 7.34 million US dollars) was allocated to the series. The original title was The Mermaid, the Hyena and the Shark (La sirène, la hyène et le requin), and it was a co-production between the television channels TF1 and Canal+ Family which broadcast later the series. The type of animation is similar to the American series of Tex Avery, Bob Clampett and Tom and Jerry.

Dong Woo Animation and Armada TMT were the animation studios chosen for the series, similar to that of Space Goofs' second season and Oggy and the Cockroaches' third and fourth seasons. The development of the series was carried out by French studio Xilam Animation. The series' first season was ordered and picked up by Xilam in 2009, which premiered on Canal+ on December 21, 2010. The series was launched on Canal+ Family on February 12, 2011, on Cartoon+ every Saturday at 7:40 P.M. A second season was ordered in 2013, changing its art style to match some of its modern TV shows, like Paprika and Lupin's Tales. The second, third and fourth seasons aired on Gulli, with reruns airing on Canal J, TF1, TiJi and Disney Channel France.

The show was a failure on TF1 during its first season due to its poor time slot. Although it achieved some success on Canal+, it became a major hit when the second season aired on Gulli. Driven by political factors and the rise of female empowerment in the 2010s, Marina, who previously served merely as a "prize" for Zig to capture and had to be rescued by Sharko while spending most of her time on her rock, became a more active protagonist starting with the second season.

Upon receiving commission money from longstanding partner M6 Group for Gulli, Xilam Animation has begun production of Season 5 and Season 6 of the show, set to release in the year 2027 and 2028, respectively. Unlike the usual 78x7' format of the series, 52 episodes will be issued for each season now onwards.

== Broadcast and distribution ==
The series has also aired on Super RTL, Nickelodeon India, Nickelodeon Sonic, Cartoonito, TV3, TV9, K2, Toons.TV, RTSH, LNK, Disney Channel Southeast Asia and South Korea, Arutz HaYeladim, DeA Kids, Nova Fun, TVB, NPO Zappelin Extra and Cartoon Network Arabic.

On May 6, 2015, the official YouTube channel for Zig & Sharko was created, with all of the episodes – in a high-quality, widescreen format – from seasons 1 to 4. The channel also made various compilations and episodes with English title cards. As of March 2025, the channel has 16 million subscribers making it one of the top 10 most-subscribed French channels on the site. As of May 2024, "The Were-Yena" (the 67th episode of the first season) is the most-viewed episode of the official channel, with over 144 million views. The most-viewed compilation has 157 million views.

== Spin-off ==
In 2021, a spin-off series was created by Alexandre Simard, Mathieu Peters-Houg and Lucille Briand for Xilam, named The Adventures of Bernie. The series focused on the titular character who, while helping Zig in his next scheme to target and eat Marina, is sent off their island home in a freak accident and ends up in the depths of the rock-bottom ocean. The episodes focus on Bernie's endeavors in using his intelligence and inventive skills to find a way back home, and to Zig, all while meeting with a variety of new characters along the way. The series takes place in the same universe with a different art style like Oggy and the Cockroaches: Next Generation, and employs silent slapstick humor, but with each episode being three and a half minutes long – with the exception of the first episode.
