= Strength and Honour =

- Theatrical release poster
- Directed by: Mark Mahon
- Written by: Mark Mahon
- Produced by: Mark Mahon
- Starring: Michael Madsen; Vinnie Jones; Richard Chamberlain; Patrick Bergin
- Cinematography: Alan Almond
- Edited by: Kate Coggins
- Music by: Ilan Eshkeri
- Distributed by: Eclipse Pictures
- Release date: 30 November 2007 (Ireland)
- Running time: 104 minutes
- Country: Ireland
- Language: English

Strength and Honour is a 2007 Irish sports drama film written, produced and directed by Mark Mahon. It was shot in Cork, Ireland. Filming took place in the city and county including Kinsale, Rochestown, Passage West and the un-opened maternity ward of the Cork University Hospital as well as the new airport.

The film had its market premiere preview screening at the Cannes Film Festival in May 2007, and won the "Best Picture" and "Best Actor" awards at the Boston Film Festival.

It was released on 20 November 2007 in Ireland and was market tested on a limited capacity in the United States on 7 December 2007. It was given a 15A rating in Ireland. After the US testing, the film was re-cut taking 13 minutes off it and the film was fully completed in 2008.

In 2009, the Film was selected to screen at the Writers Guild of America and received a review in the Los Angeles Times that described it as 'another Slumdog Millionaire'. Later the same year, Michael Madsen and Mark Mahon appeared on the TODAY show in New York, as there was such strong word of mouth about the film.

On 17 March 2010, Mark Mahon and the film's main cast were invited by Prince Albert of Monaco to a private Royal screening at the Palace of Monaco.

== Plot ==
Strength and Honour tells the story of an Irish-American boxer, Sean Kelleher (Michael Madsen), who accidentally kills his friend in the ring and promises his wife that he will never box again. However, years later, when he discovers that his only son is dying of the same hereditary heart disorder which has taken his wife, he is forced to break his promise to raise the substantial funds needed for the surgery that could save his son’s life.

== Cast ==
- Michael Madsen as Sean Kelleher
- Vinnie Jones as "Smasher" O'Driscoll
- Patrick Bergin as "Papa Boss"
- Richard Chamberlain as Denis O'Leary
- Gail Fitzpatrick as "Mammy" McGrath
- Michael Rawley as "Chaser" McGrath
- Luke Whelton as Michael Kelleher Jr.
- Finbar Furey as Chosky Boss
- Coco McGrath as Sheridan Mahon
- Baby McGrath as Krystal Mahon
- Barry Leacy as Myles Horgan
- Fixer Ward as Michael Galvin
- Gary Cashman as "Blackie"

== Reception ==
The film initially received negative reviews on both its test American and Irish releases. It was released on 20 November 2007 in Ireland and was market tested on a limited capacity in the United States on 7 December 2007. Mark Mahon was nominated for an I.F.T.A. (Irish Film and Television Academy Award) for his efforts. It was given a 15A rating in Ireland. After the US testing, the film was re-cut taking 13 minutes off it, and the film was fully completed in 2008. It then became a film festival favorite and built a significant fan base.

== Awards ==
It then went on to win the following awards:

- won the "Best Picture" and "Best Actor" awards at the Boston Film Festival
- Winner – Festival Prize – 23rd Boston Film Festival
- Winner – Best Feature – 23rd Boston Film Festival
- Winner – Michael Madsen, Best Actor – 23rd Boston Film Festival
- Winner – Best Feature – 2008 Downtown Los Angeles Film Festival
- Winner – Michael Madsen, Best Actor – 2008 Downtown Los Angeles Film Festival
- Winner – Best Feature – 2008 New York International Film Festival
- Winner – Best Director – 2008 New York International Film Festival
- Winner – Michael Madsen, Best Actor – 2008 New York International Film Festival
- Winner – Best Score – 2008 New York International Film Festival
- Winner – 56th Annual Columbus International Film Festival (Chris Awards)
- Winner – Best American Independent Feature – 2008 Mount Shasta International Film Festival
- Winner – Best Performance in a Feature – 2008 Mount Shasta International Film Festival
- Winner – Best Foreign Feature – 2008 International Action On Film Festival
- Winner – Best Director – 2008 International Action On Film Festival
- Winner – Best Screenplay – 2008 Alan J. Bailey Excellence Award
- Winner – Best Supporting Actor – 2008 Alan J. Bailey Excellence Award
- Winner – Best Soundtrack – 2008 Malibu International Film Festival
- Winner – Best Picture – 2008 Apra Foundation for Film, Music and Art (AFFMA)
- Winner – Best Director – 2008 23rd Fort Lauderdale International Film Festival
- Writers Guild of America Selection in Pete Hammond’s Screening Series
- Winner – Best Picture – 2009 Aurora Awards
- Winner – Best Picture – 2009 Moscow Sports Film Festival

Strength and Honour also had official selections from several film festivals, including selections at several non-competitive festivals such as Cairo, Cambridge, Portugal, Moscow, Rome, Seville and Shanghai. The film was also selected by the Beijing Olympics Committee for their Sports Film Screening Week in 2008.
