= The Young Victoria (soundtrack) =

The Young Victoria (Music from the Motion Picture)

Film score by Ilan Eshkeri
- Released: 10 March 2009
- Recorded: 2008–2009
- Studios: Abbey Road Studios, London
- Genre: Film score
- Length: 51:34
- Label: EMI
- Producer: Steve McLaughlin

Ilan Eshkeri chronology
| Telstar: The Joe Meek Story (2008) | The Young Victoria (2009) | Ninja Assassin (2009) |

The Young Victoria (Music from the Motion Picture) is the soundtrack to the 2009 film The Young Victoria directed by Jean-Marc Vallée, starring Emily Blunt, Rupert Friend, Paul Bettany, Miranda Richardson, Harriet Walter, Mark Strong, and Jim Broadbent among a large ensemble cast. The album contains the film score composed by Ilan Eshkeri and an original song "Only You" performed by Sinéad O'Connor. The album was released through EMI Music on 10 March 2009.

== Development ==
Director Vallée used his background as a DJ to "create a structure for a film using music with the right rhythm and balance" as well as combining "classical pieces with a rock spirit". During filming Vallée often played rock music, such as the Rolling Stones and Sigur Rós, to create the right "mood" before a scene and also gave each actor a particular song to listen as a preparation for the role, such as Cat Stevens' "Trouble" for Victoria (Emily Blunt). Co-producer Dennis O'Sullivan found Vallée's ear for music for "terrific" where the sequences "are connected and carried through by music so deftly that you forget you're watching a period film".

"There is a stretch early on that's about nine minutes long, all one piece of music, that covers numerous scenes and plot points—it's incredible because as we were prepping the film, Jean-Marc already had found this piece of classical music and was basically shooting with that in mind. The result is seamless. The combination of Jean-Marc's musical bent and Jill Bilcock's experience on films like Moulin Rouge! made for an amazing chemistry that really works well with Ilan's score. The whole movie has a pace and rhythm that comes from a very musical place. It's a great help in telling this story where so many of the emotions are sometimes repressed."

— Dennis O'Sullivan

Executive producer Colin Vaines knew composer Ilan Eshkeri and hired him for the film. One of the first pieces the producers heard from Eshkeri was his interpretation of Franz Schubert's "Swan Song" which played a key role in the film. O'Sullivan added, "Ilan saw how Jean-Marc and Jill had structured these two intercutting scenes—one between Victoria and a manipulative Melbourne, the other between lovelorn Albert and his brother—and he just tied these scenes together so beautifully with this one piece of music, it was a revelation".

Vallée talked to Eshkeri and his music producer Steve McLaughlin about the traditional to unique rock pieces transitioning throughout the film, where he wanted the score to have an "energy and heart" unlike other period films that accompany traditional instruments. Sinéad O'Connor performed "Only You," which O'Sullivan described as "very much in line with one of the overriding aims of the film, which was to be hopeful and tell people that these amazing love stories really can happen, it's not just a fairy tale."

== Release ==
The soundtrack was released through EMI Music on 10 March 2009.

== Track listing ==
| No. | Title | Length |
|---|---|---|
| 1. | "Childhood" | 3:09 |
| 2. | "Go To England, Make Her Smile (Albert's Theme)" | 1:08 |
| 3. | "Down The Stairs (Victoria's Theme)" | 0:57 |
| 4. | "The King's Birthday" | 6:00 |
| 5. | "Swan Song" | 2:26 |
| 6. | "The King Is Dead" | 3:07 |
| 7. | "Buckingham Palace" | 1:06 |
| 8. | "Lord Melbourne (Antonín Dvořák)" | 1:07 |
| 9. | "Albert Returns" | 1:55 |
| 10. | "Archery" | 1:19 |
| 11. | "The First Waltz" | 1:45 |
| 12. | "Rainy Gazebo" | 1:59 |
| 13. | "Letters From Victoria" | 1:17 |
| 14. | "Constitutional Crisis" | 2:20 |
| 15. | "Riot" | 1:38 |
| 16. | "Letters From Albert" | 1:18 |
| 17. | "Marriage Proposal" | 3:55 |
| 18. | "Honeymoon" | 2:18 |
| 19. | "Assassin" | 4:02 |
| 20. | "Victoria And Albert" | 3:32 |
| 21. | "Only You – Sinéad O'Connor" | 5:17 |

== Reception ==
Danny Graydon of Empire rated four stars out of five saying "composer Ilan Eshkeri capitalises on the ideal opportunity to bestow the customary pomp and circumstance material". Reviewer based at Gramophone wrote "One can't help wishing that the producers, including Martin Scorsese, had commissioned a new piece of work for the screen, especially as Eshkeri's original work fits the bill well enough; but what we have is likely to appeal at the very least to all those who have seen the film." Jonathan Broxton of Movie Music UK wrote "The Young Victoria really is the absolute antithesis of Eshkeri's other 2009 score, Ninja Assassin, and as much as the two scores highlight the composer's versatility and talent across multiple genres and styles, I much prefer the music heard here." Derek Elly of Variety called it a "copious score" which in turn "lacks any strong musical motifs, but its classical, vamp-'til-ready style lends both dignity and romance to the material."

Kirk Honeycutt of The Hollywood Reporter and Manohla Dargis of The New York Times called the musical score both "pompous" and "soaring". Fionnualla Halligan of Screen International wrote "The score doesn't help. Handel's swelling, omnipresent Coronation Anthem of Zadok the Priest is only matched by the bizarre addition of Sinead O'Connor on the end credits warbling a song called Only You - Love Theme From The YoungVictoria." Orlando Sentinel and Roger Moore of East Bay Times wrote "composer Ilan Eshkeri scores such scenes with music so thrilling you'll feel you've got a front-row seat to the real thing."

== Accolades ==
| Award | Date of ceremony | Category | Recipients | Result |
|---|---|---|---|---|
| Ivor Novello Awards | October 2010 | Best Original Score | Ilan Eshkeri | Nominated |

== Personnel credits ==
Credits adapted from liner notes:

- Music composer: Ilan Eshkeri
- Music producer, recording and mixing: Steve McLaughlin
- Supervising music editor: Jay Duerr
- Additional music editor: Christoph Bauschinger
- Music production co-ordinator: Elisa Kustow
- Music preparation: Vic Fraser, Jill Streeter
- Music engineers: Richard Lancaster, Lewis Jones
- Orchestra: The London Metropolitan Orchestra
- Conductor: Andy Brown
- Orchestrators: Robert Elhai, Jeff Toyne, Ilan Eshkeri
- Additional orchestrators: Julian Kershaw, Jessica Dannheisser
- Score recorded at: Abbey Road Studios
- Score mixed at: North Pole Studio and British Grove Studios

Featured musicians

- Piano: Sally Heath
- Harp: Gillian Tinglay
- Counter tenor vocals: William Purefoy, Celia Graham, Chad Hobson
- Glass Harmonica: Alisdaire Malloy
- Violin: Gabrielle Lester
- Cello: Caroline Dale
- Drums: Scott Shields
