= Toothpaste tube theory =

Metaphor

A toothpaste tube with blue toothpaste

The toothpaste tube theory is a jocular metaphor stating that increasing pressure eventually forces some sort of release, just as when one squeezes a toothpaste tube, toothpaste comes out. It is used to explain social and political behavior, as well as abstract relationships. It is often used for irreversible processes, since getting toothpaste out of a tube is easy, while putting it back in is next to impossible.

== Applications of the theory ==
In administrative law, the toothpaste tube theory describes problems of displacement, for instance, where discretion or accountability are shifted elsewhere. In the case, Byrnes v. LCI Communication Holdings Co. an appeals court rejected one formulation of the toothpaste tube theory.

In labor law, the toothpaste tube theory means employer and employee relations are always under pressure.

In economics, the toothpaste tube theory may be applied to, for instance, exports. Under this formulation, when home demand is squeezed, exports are extruded.

In geography, the toothpaste tube theory can be used to explain the activity and behavior of glaciers with regards to their effect on the land via erosion.

== Other formulations ==
Some versions of the toothpaste tube theory observe that there are diminishing returns.
