= List of Zig & Sharko episodes =

This is a list of episodes from the French animated series, Zig & Sharko.

== Series overview ==
Season	Segments	Episodes	Originally released		
Season	Segments	Episodes	First released	Last released	Network
1	78	26	December 21, 2010	June 14, 2011	Canal+
2	78	26	February 15, 2016	August 8, 2016	Gulli
3	78	26	September 2, 2019	March 21, 2020	Gulli
4	78	26	November 6, 2023	April 16, 2024	Gulli; M6

== Episodes ==
=== Season 1 (2010–11) ===
Throughout the first season, much of the plots revolve around the oceans surrounding a tropical volcanic island, in which Marina often spends the day residing on a rocky pinnacle off the coast, while residing in an underwater home that she shares with Sharko.

No. overall	No. in season	Title	Story by	Storyboard by	Original release date	U.S. air date
1a	1a	"Fishy Story" "Hyène de vie"	Olivier Jean-Marie	Olivier Jean-Marie	December 21, 2010	September 6, 2011
Zig, a hungry hyena, tries to steal Marina the mermaid from Sharko, her bodyguard and longtime love.
1b	1b	"Desert Island Drought" "Au sec"	Hugo Gittard	Jean Texier	December 21, 2010	September 6, 2011
Zig accidentally dries up the ocean and tries to take advantage of the situation to get to Marina.
1c	1c	"King Neptune's Court" "La cour du Roi Neptune"	Hugo Gittard	Hugo Gittard	December 21, 2010	September 6, 2011
Zig and Sharko must join forces to get Marina back from King Neptune, who seeks to make her his bride.
2a	2a	"The Slick" "Marée noire"	Hugo Gittard	Julien Thompson	December 28, 2010	September 13, 2011
An oil spill fouls the lagoon. While Bernie finds a way to clean it up, Zig tries to navigate the slick.
2b	2b	"Treasure Island Tricks" "L'île au trésor"	Hugo Gittard	Julien Thompson	December 28, 2010	September 13, 2011
Sharko discovers a pirate's buried treasure and builds a luxury mansion.
2c	2c	"Cold Snap" "Coup de froid"	Olivier Jean-Marie	Andres Fernandez	December 28, 2010	September 13, 2011
Zig and Sharko battle a polar bear after the ocean freezes.
3a	3a	"Mermaid's Pups" "Le toutou à sa sirène"	Olivier Jean-Marie	Jean Texier	January 4, 2011	September 20, 2011
Marina adopts Bernie as a pet and Zig discovers the undersea house that she shares with Sharko.
3b	3b	"Work in Progress" "Les maçons du lagon"	Hugo Gittard	Mr. Niko	January 4, 2011	September 20, 2011
Sharko forces Zig to help him rebuild Marina's house after accidentally destroying it by throwing a whale into it.
3c	3c	"Cruising" "Plaisante Plaisance"	Olivier Jean-Marie	Alexandre Viano	January 4, 2011	September 20, 2011
Zig builds ships in a scheme to eat Marina.
4a	4a	"The Mermaid in the Sky" "Fille de l'air"	Hugo Gittard	Hugo Gittard	January 11, 2011	September 27, 2011
Marina dreams of being a flight attendant, and gets her chance when Sharko acquires one.
4b	4b	"A Lovesick Survivor" "Un naufragé sentimental"	Hugo Gittard	Jean Texier	January 11, 2011	September 27, 2011
A human castaway earns Zig and Sharko's ire as he vies for Marina's affections.
4c	4c	"Digging Deep" "Le tunnel sous le lagon"	Hugo Gittard	Jean Texier	January 11, 2011	September 27, 2011
Zig finds interesting surprises while digging a tunnel in his latest scheme to catch Marina.
5a	5a	"Waterski Hit!" "Ski nautique"	Olivier Jean-Marie	Olivier Jean-Marie	January 18, 2011	October 4, 2011
When Marina takes up water skiing using Sharko as her "boat", Zig enlists a crazy dolphin's help to catch her.
5b	5b	"Nurse Marina" "La sirène aux petits soins"	Olivier Jean-Marie	Mr. Niko	January 18, 2011	October 4, 2011
When Marina nurses Zig back to health, the hyena tries to lure her back by faking injuries, but his plan sours when he and Sharko are injured for real.
5c	5c	"Hundreds of Kids and Counting" "Famille nombreuse, famille heureuse"	Olivier Jean-Marie	Mr. Niko	January 18, 2011	October 4, 2011
Bernie becomes a surrogate father to a lost herd of baby hermit crabs.
6a	6a	"The Submarine" "Le sous-marin"	Olivier Jean-Marie	Mr. Niko	January 25, 2011	October 11, 2011
Zig and Bernie disguise an old submarine as a female shark to lure Sharko away from Marina.
6b	6b	"A Tale of Two Legs" "À toutes jambes!"	Olivier Jean-Marie	Julien Thompson	January 25, 2011	October 11, 2011
Zig and Bernie discover a mannequin on the island, while Marina discovers something much more profound.
6c	6c	"Little Shrimp Buddy" "Mon ami la crevette"	Hugo Gittard	Frédéric Mintoff	January 25, 2011	October 11, 2011
A shrimp competes with Bernie as Zig's assistant.
7a	7a	"The Horribly Hungry Hyena" "La fureur de la hyène"	Hugo Gittard	Jean Texier	February 1, 2011	October 18, 2011
Ninja Zig tries to sabotage Sharko and Marina's dinner date.
7b	7b	"Volcano Turbo" "Un caractère volcanique"	Olivier Jean-Marie	Julien Thompson	February 1, 2011	October 18, 2011
Zig tries using the active volcano against Marina.
7c	7c	"Lighthouse" "Phare breton"	Hugo Gittard	Christophe Yoshida	February 1, 2011	October 18, 2011
A lighthouse is put up near the island after the fog rolls in.
8a	8a	"Bamboozled" "Coup de bambou"	Olivier Jean-Marie	Olivier Jean-Marie	February 8, 2011	October 25, 2011
Zig finds a wrecked boat on the shore and uses its cargo of bamboo in his latest scheme.
8b	8b	"Blown Up!" "Gonflé"	Olivier Jean-Marie	Frédéric Mintoff	February 8, 2011	October 25, 2011
Zig uses inflatable balloons to get to Marina.
8c	8c	"Silly Builders" "Brique à brac"	Olivier Jean-Marie	Frédéric Mintoff	February 8, 2011	October 25, 2011
Zig builds a boat out of LEGO-like building blocks to catch Marina.
9a	9a	"The Manic Mermaid" "Alerte à la sirène"	Hugo Gittard	Jean Texier	February 15, 2011	November 1, 2011
Marina has to compete with another mermaid for Sharko's affections.
9b	9b	"Aqua Golf"	Hugo Gittard	Pierre Violot	February 15, 2011	November 1, 2011
Zig attempts to catch Marina while she plays golf with Sharko.
9c	9c	"The Island Tour" "Le tour de l'île"	Hugo Gittard	Mr. Niko	February 15, 2011	November 1, 2011
Zig holds a go-cart race to catch Marina.
10a	10a	"Moby Zig"	Olivier Jean-Marie	Julien Thompson	February 22, 2011	November 8, 2011
Whales invade the lagoon, and Zig is swallowed by one after a botched scheme.
10b	10b	"Santa Zig" "Noël au lagon"	Olivier Jean-Marie	Olivier Jean-Marie	February 22, 2011	November 8, 2011
Zig dresses up as Santa Claus to catch Marina.
10c	10c	"Saving Mermaid Marina" "Il faut sauver Marina"	Olivier Jean-Marie	Julien Thompson	February 22, 2011	November 8, 2011
Marina is trapped inside an abandoned pool, and Sharko must fend Zig off without his trusty muscles after the cage's bars violently shock him.
11a	11a	"Silly Sleight of Hand" "Tour de passe-passe"	Olivier Jean-Marie	Frédéric Mintoff	March 1, 2011	November 15, 2011
Zig and Bernie find a magician's powerful hat and cane and use all sorts of its magic to catch Marina.
11b	11b	"Hammerhead Cousin" "Cousin marteau"	Hugo Gittard	Jean Texier	March 1, 2011	November 15, 2011
As Sharko must leave temporarily, he hires his dimwitted hammerhead shark cousin to watch over Marina.
11c	11c	"Sharko Hunting" "Chasse au Sharko"	Olivier Jean-Marie	Christophe Leborgne	March 1, 2011	November 15, 2011
A Japanese whaling ship tries to capture Sharko.
12a	12a	"The Challengers" "La bataille des costauds"	Olivier Jean-Marie	Stéphane Annette	March 8, 2011	November 22, 2011
A manta ray competes with Sharko for Marina's affections.
12b	12b	"Birthday Party" "Surprise party"	Hugo Gittard	Pierre Violot	March 8, 2011	November 22, 2011
Zig throws Marina a birthday party to trap her, since she is angry at Sharko for forgetting her birthday.
12c	12c	"The Coach" "Le coach"	Olivier Jean-Marie	Julien Thompson	March 8, 2011	November 22, 2011
A jaguar shows up on the island and tries to coach Zig into becoming buff.
13a	13a	"Frozen Island" "Une hyène en hiver"	Hugo Gittard	Frédéric Mintoff	March 15, 2011	November 29, 2011
Sharko turns the island into a ski resort so that Marina can try out some winter sports.
13b	13b	"At Your Service" "À votre service"	Hugo Gittard	Jean Texier	March 15, 2011	November 29, 2011
Zig becomes Marina's butler in an attempt to catch her.
13c	13c	"Freedom for Marina!" "Libérez Marina!"	Olivier Jean-Marie	Pierre Violot	March 15, 2011	November 29, 2011
Zig and Sharko must join forces to rescue Marina, who is being taken to an aquarium.
14a	14a	"Marina's New Friend" "La copine de Marina"	Olivier Jean-Marie	Stéphane Annette	March 22, 2011	December 6, 2011
Sharko dresses Zig as a mermaid and forces him to become Marina's companion.
14b	14b	"The Fan" "Le fan"	Olivier Jean-Marie	Julien Thompson	March 22, 2011	December 6, 2011
A piranha befriends Sharko and Marina but actually intends to eat her.
14c	14c	"The Ghastly Ghost" "Un fantôme encombrant"	Olivier Jean-Marie	Jean Cayrol	March 22, 2011	December 6, 2011
Marina becomes friends with a ghost who shows up at her house to Sharko's dismay.
15a	15a	"Sea's Up" "Tous à l'eau"	Olivier Jean-Marie	Alexandre Viano	March 29, 2011	December 13, 2011
A rainstorm floods the island and Marina temporarily loses Sharko while exploring their expanded horizon.
15b	15b	"Fairground Follies!" "Tournez manèges!!!"	Hugo Gittard	Stéphane Annette	March 29, 2011	December 13, 2011
Zig and Bernie build an amusement park to trap Marina.
15c	15c	"Zig's Jumbo Friend" "Un ami de poids"	Hugo Gittard	Frédéric Mintoff	March 29, 2011	December 13, 2011
Zig finds an elephant in a crate washed up on shore and tries to use it in his schemes.
16a	16a	"Bottom's Bottom" "Le fond du fond"	Olivier Jean-Marie	Alexandre Viano	April 5, 2011	December 20, 2011
Zig and Sharko find a strange and mysterious place at the bottom of the sea.
16b	16b	"Babysitting"	Olivier Jean-Marie	Julien Thompson	April 5, 2011	December 20, 2011
Marina babysits a baby octopus, who proves a real problen for Zig.
16c	16c	"Caution, Genius at Work!" "Drôles de machines"	Hugo Gittard	Jean Texier	April 5, 2011	December 20, 2011
Zig finds a book of Da Vinci's inventions and tries to use them in his schemes.
17a	17a	"Goin' Home" "Retour au pays"	Olivier Jean-Marie	Jean Cayrol	April 12, 2011	December 27, 2011
Zig returns to Africa to live among his fellow hyenas, but finds he doesn't fit in. Meanwhile, Sharko deeply misses having Zig around to beat up.
17b	17b	"Sharko and His Folks" "Sharko et les siens"	Olivier Jean-Marie	Pierre Violot	April 12, 2011	December 27, 2011
Sharko's parents visit, but they disapprove of his relationship with a mermaid and he must make do with Zig's latest scheme.
17c	17c	"Calamity Camping" "Désastre au camping"	Hugo Gittard	Jean Texier	April 12, 2011	December 27, 2011
Marina and Sharko go camping, but Zig and Bernie aren't far behind.
18a	18a	"Magical Jellyfish" "Méduse magique"	Hugo Gittard	Julien Thompson	April 19, 2011	January 3, 2012
Zig uses a shapeshifting jellyfish that washes up on shore in his latest scheme.
18b	18b	"Boo... Who!" "Hoquet, tout va bien"	Hugo Gittard	Stéphane Annette	April 19, 2011	January 3, 2012
Zig volunteers to help rid Sharko's hiccups as another scheme to get Marina.
18c	18c	"Super Zig"	Olivier Jean-Marie	Jean Cayrol	April 19, 2011	January 3, 2012
Inspired by a TV show, Zig emulates a superhero to trap Marina.
19a	19a	"The Tiny Tyrant" "Le mini-maître"	Olivier Jean-Marie	Frédéric Mintoff	April 26, 2011	January 10, 2012
Bernie makes a strength potion to take over King Neptune's castle.
19b	19b	"Coral Reef Cowboys" "Ok Corail"	Olivier Jean-Marie	Andrès Fernandez	April 26, 2011	January 10, 2012
Zig gets knocked unconscious and dreams he is in a Western.
19c	19c	"The King's Highway" "La voie royale"	Olivier Jean-Marie	Jean Texier	April 26, 2011	January 10, 2012
King Neptune wants to build a road to his tennis court through Marina and Sharko's house.
20a	20a	"Fancy Footwork" "Jeux de jambes"	Olivier Jean-Marie	Stéphane Annette	May 3, 2011	January 17, 2012
A "fishy godmother" grants Marina's wish for legs, but it causes more problems than it solves.
20b	20b	"Origami"	Olivier Jean-Marie	Frédéric Mintoff	May 3, 2011	January 17, 2012
Zig and Bernie find a variety of origami creations from a wrecked cargo ship and use them in their schemes.
20c	20c	"Me, Myself and I" "Qui est qui?"	Olivier Jean-Marie	Julien Thompson	May 3, 2011	January 17, 2012
The shock of an electric eel causes Zig and Sharko to switch bodies.
21a	21a	"War of the Clones" "La guerre des clones"	Olivier Jean-Marie	Andrès Fernandez	May 10, 2011	January 24, 2012
Bernie makes robot clones of Zig to get Marina, but they can't be controlled.
21b	21b	"Save the Hyena!" "Sauvez la hyène!"	Olivier Jean-Marie	Julien Thompson	May 10, 2011	January 24, 2012
When Marina becomes a lifeguard, Zig pretends to drown to trap her.
21c	21c	"Bristlebeard's Adventure" "La bande à Barbak"	Hugo Gittard	Alexandre Viano	May 10, 2011	January 24, 2012
A band of pirates tries to capture Marina.
22a	22a	"The Noble Knights of the Lagoon" "Preux chevalier du lagon"	Hugo Gittard	Jean Cayrol	May 17, 2011	January 31, 2012
Zig challenges Sharko to a jousting duel.
22b	22b	"Troublemakers" "Faut pas se gêner!"	Olivier Jean-Marie	Julien Thompson	May 17, 2011	January 31, 2012
Zig and Marina must rescue Sharko from King Neptune's dungeon.
22c	22c	"Marina Superstar"	Olivier Jean-Marie	Olivier Jean-Marie	May 17, 2011	January 31, 2012
When King Neptune makes Marina a singing star, Sharko must team up with Zig to get her back.
23a	23a	"The Were-Yena" "La Hyène Garou"	Hugo Gittard	Alexandre Viano	May 24, 2011	February 7, 2012
Eating bananas causes Zig to transform into a Jekyll and Hyde monster.
23b	23b	"Loony Cruise" "La croisière s'amuse"	Olivier Jean-Marie	Stéphane Annette	May 24, 2011	February 7, 2012
When a cruise ship visits the island, Marina and Sharko pose as passengers pursued by Zig and Bernie.
23c	23c	"Lightning Love" "Coup de foudre"	Olivier Jean-Marie	Pierre Violot	May 24, 2011	February 7, 2012
Zig gets amnesia and reverts to a baby after getting struck by lightning.
24a	24a	"Bernie Moves House" "Bernie déménage"	Olivier Jean-Marie	Andrès Fernandez	May 31, 2011	February 14, 2012
Bernie moves away from the island after a bitter argument with Zig, and invites Sharko and Marina to a house party.
24b	24b	"Hair Story" "Marina se fait des cheveux"	Olivier Jean-Marie	Julien Thompson	May 31, 2011	February 14, 2012
Sharko and Marina's hairdresser try to fix Marina's bad haircut before the shark takes her to the opera.
24c	24c	"Space Fruits" "Gare au jus!"	Olivier Jean-Marie	Frédéric Mintoff	May 31, 2011	February 14, 2012
Extraterrestrial fruit juices give Zig and Sharko strange powers.
25a	25a	"Zig Taxi-Driver" "Zig le taxi"	Hugo Gittard	Andrès Fernandez	June 7, 2011	February 21, 2012
Zig decides to take advantage of Marina's shopping addiction by posing as a cab driver.
25b	25b	"Cop Duty" "Inspecteur Sharko"	Hugo Gittard	Pierre Violot	June 7, 2011	February 21, 2012
Marina convinces Sharko to join the police force, and Zig fakes various emergencies to distract him and capture Marina.
25c	25c	"Goofy Astronauts" "Micmac dans l'espace"	Olivier Jean-Marie	Julien Thompson	June 7, 2011	February 21, 2012
Marina, Sharko, Zig, and Bernie find a rocket and are accidentally shot into orbit, where they meet a deranged astronaut on a space station.
26a	26a	"Fisherman's Catch" "Coup de filet"	Olivier Jean-Marie	Frédéric Mintoff	June 14, 2011	February 28, 2012
A fisherman arrives at the island and accidentally damages the undersea to catch scallops.
26b	26b	"The Return of the Crazy Dolphin" "Le retour du dauphin zinzin"	Olivier Jean-Marie	Alexandre Viano	June 14, 2011	February 28, 2012
When Zig gives up trying to catch Marina, Bernie missions the crazy dolphin to lure her to the island.
26c	26c	"Toys Attack!" "Zig et les joujous"	Olivier Jean-Marie	Frédéric Mintoff	June 14, 2011	February 28, 2012
A shipwrecked boat carries toys, which Zig employs in his schemes. Note: This is the last episode to feature the old character designs.

=== Season 2 (2016) ===
In the second season, the plots shifted to the island itself, including its beaches, volcano, and jungle, with some changes for the main characters - Marina takes residence in an ornate, life-sized sandcastle, built by Sharko; Zig and Bernie live with a cargo plane pilot in his crashed plane within the jungle, and Sharko operates as a lifeguard for the aquatic lifeforms who frequent the beaches.

No. overall	No. in season	Title	Directed by	Written by	Storyboard by	Original release date	U.S. air date
27a	1a	"What a Day" "Dure Journée !!"	Andrès Fernandez; Hugo Gittard	Hugo Gittard	Andrès Fernandez	February 15, 2016	TBA
Zig can't believe his luck when Marina decides to live on the beach in a sandcastle built by Sharko.
27b	1b	"Beach Hero" "Zig ce Héros"	Andrès Fernandez; Hugo Gittard	Hugo Gittard	Cédric Dietsch	February 15, 2016	TBA
Zig is mistaken for a hero for "rescuing" a little crab, and hatches a scheme to turn everyone against Sharko.
27c	1c	"Back to Civilization" "Retour a la Civilisation"	Andrès Fernandez; Hugo Gittard	Hugo Gittard	Andres Fernandez	February 15, 2016	TBA
Marina wants to re-educate the looney pilot living in the wrecked cargo plane with Zig and Bernie.
28a	2a	"Father in Law" "Beau Papa"	Andrès Fernandez; Hugo Gittard	Hugo Gittard	Julien Thompson	February 22, 2016	TBA
Sharko enlists Zig and Bernie's help to impress Marina's father, King Poseidon.
28b	2b	"Stuffed Animals" "Zig Mon Doudou"	Andrès Fernandez; Hugo Gittard	Yannick Hervieu	Louis Musso	February 22, 2016	TBA
Zig becomes the plaything of a spoilt baby dolphin, who mistakes him for its lost plush toy and throws loud tantrums whenever he loses him.
28c	2c	"Castle Life" "La Vie de Château"	Andrès Fernandez; Hugo Gittard	Hugo Gittard	Julien Thompson	February 22, 2016	TBA
Zig and Bernie get a taste of the good life when Marina invites them to live in her sandcastle.
29a	3a	"Zig Airlines" "Embarquement Immédiat !"	Andrès Fernandez; Hugo Gittard	Hugo Gittard	Pierre Violot	February 29, 2016	TBA
Zig and Bernie trick Marina and Sharko into a trip to China on their wrecked plane.
29b	3b	"Mermaid Fritter" "Beignet de Sirene"	Andrès Fernandez; Hugo Gittard	Renaud Gagnon	Louis Musso	February 29, 2016	TBA
Tired of Zig's constant failures, Bernie tricks Zig into thinking he has succeeded in eating Marina. Deprived of his life's purpose, Zig sinks into depression.
29c	3c	"A Mysterious Guest" "Un Invité Mystère"	Andrès Fernandez; Hugo Gittard	Hugo Gittard	Pierre Violot	February 29, 2016	TBA
Zig lures Marina and Sharko in the jungle with tales about evil koala.
30a	4a	"End of the World" "La Fin du Monde"	Andrès Fernandez; Hugo Gittard	Andrès Fernandez	Alexandre Viano	March 7, 2016	TBA
Everyone freaks out when a giant asteroid heads for the island.
30b	4b	"Let's Dance!" "Et Si On Dansait ?"	Andrès Fernandez; Hugo Gittard	Nicolas Le Nevé	Louis Musso	March 7, 2016	TBA
Zig and Bernie infiltrate a dance party to catch Marina, while Sharko deals the mind-controlled bouncer as he goes after the hyena.
30c	4c	"Sea, Surf and Fun" "Surf sous les Tropiques"	Andrès Fernandez; Hugo Gittard	Hugo Gittard	Pierre Violot	March 7, 2016	TBA
Marina takes up surfing; Bernie steals Poseidon's trident so Zig can surf on huge waves.
31a	5a	"Bad Hair Day" "Moumoute et Moustache"	Andrès Fernandez	Cédric Dietsch	Julien Thompson	March 14, 2016	TBA
Zig disguises himself with a fake mustache after getting banned in the island, but doesn't fool Sharko; Sharko similarly uses a wig after getting himself banned for beating up the "new guest".
31b	5b	"Fishing for Hyenas" "La Pêche a la Hyène"	Andrès Fernandez	Nicolas Le Nevé	Louis Musso	March 14, 2016	TBA
An underwater fisherman comes to island and makes Zig his next catch.
31c	5c	"Run Sharko, Run!" "Cours Sharko, Cours !"	Andrès Fernandez	Hugo Gittard; Yannick Hervieu	Louis Musso	March 14, 2016	TBA
Marina gives Sharko a pair of running shoes for a race, but they don't fit; Zig finds them and uses them to catch Marina.
32a	6a	"The Conquistador" "Le Conquistador"	Andrès Fernandez	Hugo Gittard	Alexandre Viano	March 21, 2016	TBA
A conquistador comes to the island and tries to take Marina for an aquarium display.
32b	6b	"Game Over Not!" "C'est Pas du Jeu !"	Andrès Fernandez	François Rosso	Stéphane Annette	March 21, 2016	TBA
A pod of orcas challenge Zig, Sharko, and Bernie to a game of rugby football.
32c	6c	"Spick and Span" "Faut que ça Brille"	Andrès Fernandez	Franz Kirchner	Louis Musso	March 21, 2016	TBA
Marina wants Sharko to help her clean up the sandcastle; Zig and Bernie tries offer to "help".
33a	7a	"A Whistle for Sharko" "Un Sifflet pour Sharko"	Andrès Fernandez	Olivier Jean-Marie	Cédric Guarneri	March 28, 2016	TBA
Zig gives a whistle to Sharko for distracting him; Sharko takes his lifeguard job a little too seriously.
33b	7b	"Bionic Zig" "Bionique Zig"	Andrès Fernandez	Olivier Jean-Marie	Julien Thompson	March 28, 2016	TBA
Bernie turns Zig into a cyborg after another failed attempt.
33c	7c	"Sharko and Zig on the Rocks" "La Buvette de la Plage"	Andrès Fernandez	Andrès Fernandez	Pierre Violot	March 28, 2016	TBA
Sharko and Zig open up a juice bar on the beach.
34a	8a	"The Master of the Volcano" "Le Maître du Volcan"	Andrès Fernandez	Hugo Gittard	Alexandre Viano	April 4, 2016	TBA
Zig discovers Hades, the evil wizard, living inside of the volcano, and he falls in love with Marina and recruits Zig to get her for him.
34b	8b	"Let's Get Fit!" "En Pleine Forme !"	Andrès Fernandez	Olivier Jean-Marie	Julien Thompson	April 4, 2016	TBA
Marina discovers Sharko is gaining weight, so Zig and Bernie turn her sandcastle into a spa.
34c	8c	"It's Magic!" "C'est Magique !"	Andrès Fernandez	Nicolas Le Nevé	Céline Gobinet	April 4, 2016	TBA
Zig becomes a magician to capture Marina but finds his magic is no match for Sharko's.
35a	9a	"A Sweet Tooth" "Chasse au Sucre"	Andrès Fernandez	Yannick Hervieu	Pierre Violot	April 11, 2016	TBA
When Marina becomes obsessed with candy, Zig uses it as bait; Sharko tries to get her to eat healthily.
35b	9b	"The Scent of the Hyena" "Le Parfum de la Hyène"	Andrès Fernandez	François Rosso	Stéphane Annette	April 11, 2016	TBA
Bernie invents a deodorant that makes Zig irresistible to Marina; unfortunately it has the same effect on Sharko and everyone else (including Zig himself).
35c	9c	"Bodyguard" "Le Garde du Corps"	Andrès Fernandez	Hugo Gittard	Pierre Violot	April 11, 2016	TBA
When a masked assailant sprays everyone with black ink, Marina insists Zig be her bodyguard, to Sharko's dismay.
36a	10a	"Self-Defense Academy" "Les Sirènes Contre-Attaquent"	Andrès Fernandez	Nicolas Le Nevé	Louis Musso	April 18, 2016	TBA
Three mermaids come to visit Marina; Sharko gives the four of them martial arts self-defense lessons.
36b	10b	"A Generous Mermaid" "Une Sirène Charitable"	Andrès Fernandez	Nicolas Le Nevé	Stéphane Annette	April 18, 2016	TBA
Zig finally captures Marina, but she'd rather renovate his run-down home and enlists Sharko's help.
36c	10c	"Catch a Falling Star" "La Bonne Étoile"	Andrès Fernandez	Olivier Jean-Marie	Louis Musso	April 18, 2016	TBA
Marina loses the starfish she wears in her hair; Bernie finds it and falls in love with it.
37a	11a	"Lousy Beach Drivers" "Les Chauffards de la Plage"	Andrès Fernandez	François Rosso	Richard Méril	April 25, 2016	TBA
Sharko gets a sports car for a hot date with Marina, but she is more interested in the car.
37b	11b	"A Relative Problem" "Les Nièces Débarquent"	Andrès Fernandez	Nicolas Le Nevé	Louis Musso	April 25, 2016	TBA
Zig's nieces come to visit him on the island; they find Marina appetizing too.
37c	11c	"King of the Animal World" "Le Roi des Animaux"	Andrès Fernandez	Nicolas Le Nevé	Pierre Violot	April 25, 2016	TBA
A pair of giant lizards show up and become Zig's bodyguards, but their secret agenda is to get rich making toy replicas of him.
38a	12a	"Bosom Buddies" "Frères de Lait"	Andrès Fernandez	Hugo Gittard	Pierre Violot	May 2, 2016	TBA
Zig remembers how he and Bernie were adopted as babies by a mother gorilla.
38b	12b	"Tourists" "Les Touristes"	Andrès Fernandez	Franz Kirchner	Stéphane Annette	May 9, 2016	TBA
Marina attracts a couple of human tourists with her singing; she must disguise Sharko as a kitty cat so they aren't afraid of him.
38c	12c	"Teacher's Pet" "Premier de la Classe"	Andrès Fernandez	Olivier Jean-Marie	Richard Mēril	May 9, 2016	TBA
Marina decides to teach school to the island kids; Zig and Sharko enroll as students for obvious, respective reasons.
39a	13a	"Rolling, Action!" "Bernie fait son Cinéma"	Andrès Fernandez	Nicolas Le Nevé	Olivier Pouchleon	May 9, 2016	TBA
Bernie decides to film a Zig and Sharko movie, casting Marina and Zig as themselves but not Sharko, until he has to fire the other shark.
39b	13b	"Buzzing Around" "Bzz Bzz"	Andrès Fernandez	Hugo Gittard	Louis Musso	May 16, 2016	TBA
Marina's relaxation is ruined by a housefly.
39c	13c	"Unicorn Blues" "Une Licorne a la Plage"	Andrès Fernandez	Hugo Gittard	Richard Méril	May 16, 2016	TBA
A unicorn shows up on the island; Zig and Bernie steal its magic horn to catch Marina.
40a	14a	"Tinky Toys" "Miniatures"	Andrès Fernandez	Andrès Fernandez	Stéphane Annette	May 16, 2016	TBA
Zig finds a size-changing ray gun and tries to use it to get rid of Sharko, but he accidentally shrinks Marina too.
40b	14b	"The Invader" "L'envahisseur"	Andrès Fernandez	Pierre-Gilles Stehr; Xavier Vairé	Louis Musso	May 23, 2016	TBA
An extraterrestrial lands on the island and impersonates Bernie to catch Marina.
40c	14c	"Daddy Dearest" "Papa Poule"	Andrès Fernandez	Olivier Jean-Marie	Stéphane Annette	May 23, 2016	TBA
Marina commands Sharko to brood an unhatched egg.
41a	15a	"Lost in the Jungle" "Perdus dans la Jungle"	Andrès Fernandez	Jean-Louis Momus	Boris Guilloteau	May 23, 2016	TBA
Zig and Sharko get lost in the jungle and must work together to find their way out.
41b	15b	"Daddy's Little Doggy" "Le Toutou a son Papa"	Andrès Fernandez	Nicolas Le Levé	Anh-tu Cao	May 30, 2016	TBA
Marina and Sharko turn Zig into their pet dog.
41c	15c	"Marina Goes Farming" "Marina a la Ferme"	Andrès Fernandez	Hugo Gittard	Richard Méril	May 30, 2016	TBA
Marina decides to grow silkworms; Zig disguises himself as a giant one, which doesn't fool Sharko.
42a	16a	"Hair Do, Hair Don't" "Des Tifs a Gogo"	Andrès Fernandez	Hugo Gittard	Olivier Pouchleon	May 30, 2016	TBA
When Marina's hair cream makes her hair grow super long overnight, Zig offers to help her fix it.
42b	16b	"High on the Mountain Top" "La-haut sur la Montagne"	Andrès Fernandez	Pierre-Gilles Stehr; Xavier Vairé	Richard Méril	June 6, 2016	TBA
When a freak snowfall covers the volcano, Marina decides to go mountain climbing.
42c	16c	"The Mummy" "La Momie"	Andrès Fernandez	Pierre-Gilles Stehr; Xavier Vairé	Anh-tu Cao	June 6, 2016	TBA
Marina discovers a pyramid with an apparently friendly mummy inside.
43a	17a	"Movie Night" "On se Fait un Film ?"	Andrès Fernandez	Hugo Gittard	Louis Musso	June 13, 2016	TBA
Sharko visits Marina's sandcastle to watch a movie with her; everyone else on the island wants to watch it too.
43b	17b	"That Sinking Feeling" "Sable Émouvant"	Andrès Fernandez	Olivier Jean-Marie	Boris Guilloteau	June 20, 2016	TBA
During a chase, Zig, Sharko and Marina sink into the earth's depths and explore its unusual underground.
43c	17c	"Teen Rebels" "Rebelle Attitude"	Andrès Fernandez	Hugo Gittard	Richard Mēril	May 2, 2016	TBA
Zig remembers when he, Bernie, Sharko, and Marina were all teenagers.
44a	18a	"The Moo Can" "La Boîte à Meuh"	Andrès Fernandez	Hugo Gittard	Anh-tu Cao	June 20, 2016	TBA
Marina becomes obsessed with a moo box. Zig and Bernie use it as a trap, but Sharko wants it for himself.
44b	18b	"The Heist" "Les Rois de la Cambriole"	Andrès Fernandez	Pierre-Gilles Stehr; Xavier Vairé	Louis Musso	June 20, 2016	TBA
Sharko must stop Zig and Bernie from launching a heist on Marina's sandcastle, especially since he is convinced they want to steal Marina's necklace.
44c	18c	"An Evil Panda" "Le Panda Maléfique"	Andrès Fernandez	Hugo Gittard	Boris Guilloteau	June 27, 2016	TBA
Hades transforms himself into a panda bear to win Marina's heart.
45a	19a	"Playtime" "Copains Copine"	Andrès Fernandez	Hugo Gittard	Pierre Violot	May 2, 2016	TBA
Zig, Sharko, and Bernie remember when they used to play pirates as kids, and they first met Marina.
45b	19b	"LOL Zig"	Andrès Fernandez	Hugo Gittard	Anh-Tu Cao	June 27, 2016	TBA
Marina posts a viral video of Zig with pizza all over his face, and he becomes a celebrity.
45c	19c	"High Wired" "Sur le Fil"	Andrès Fernandez	Hugo Gittard	Anh-Tu Cao	June 27, 2016	TBA
Marina wants to set a world record for the longest tightrope-walk. Zig takes advantage when he realizes Sharko is afraid of heights.
46a	20a	"A Three-Pronged Disaster" "La Reine des Bourdes"	Andrès Fernandez	Laury Rovelli	Louis Musso	July 4, 2016	TBA
Marina thinks Poseidon is giving her a magic trident for her birthday, but he gives her a toy fish instead. So she steals his trident while he's asleep.
46b	20b	"Boing! Boing!" "Boing ! Boing !"	Andrès Fernandez	Andrès Fernandez	Louis Musso	July 4, 2016	TBA
When a cargo of trampolines falls on the island, Zig uses them to try to catch Marina.
46c	20c	"Little Train, Big Adventure" "Le Petit Train"	Andrès Fernandez	Pierre-Gilles Stehr; Xavier Vairé	Boris Guilloteau	July 4, 2016	TBA
When Marina takes an interest in toy trains, Zig and Bernie offer to give her a ride on a miniature train.
47a	21a	"Red light, Green light" "Un, Deux, Trois, Soleil !"	Andrès Fernandez	Pierre-Gilles Stehr; Xavier Vairé	Anh-Tu Cao	July 11, 2016	TBA
Marina plays "Red Light, Green Light" with the boys.
47b	21b	"The Fall" "La Chute"	Andrès Fernandez	Andrès Fernandez; Cédric Dietsch	Anh-Tu Cao	July 11, 2016	TBA
Zig uses a human cannon-ball stunt to blast Marina to the wrecked plane, but it blasts them and Sharko into space and on a long fall back to Earth.
47c	21c	"Zig Top Chef" "Zig Chef"	Andrès Fernandez	Caroline Torreli	Jérôme Fardini	July 11, 2016	TBA
Sharko has a cooking competition with Zig to win Marina's affections.
48a	22a	"Miss Beach" "Miss Plage"	Andrès Fernandez	Laury Rovelli	Anh-tu Cao	July 18, 2016	TBA
Sharko convinces Marina to enter a beauty contest on the beach.
48b	22b	"Catch You on the Rewind" "Le Jour le plus Long"	Andrès Fernandez	Laury Rovelli; Louis Musso	Boris Guilloteau	July 18, 2016	TBA
When Zig succeeds in eating Marina, a distraught Sharko steals Hades' universal remote to rewind time and prevent it.
48c	22c	"Dance of the Vampire" "Le Bal du Vampire"	Andrès Fernandez	Pierre-Gilles Stehr; Xavier Vairé	Jean-Louis Champault	July 18, 2016	TBA
Zig dresses up as a vampire to catch Marina, as she and Sharko are freaked out after watching a horror movie.
49a	23a	"Front Runner" "Tiercé Gagnant"	Andrès Fernandez	Cérdic Dietsch	Cérdic Dietsch	July 25, 2016	TBA
Zig tries using two ponies that arrive on the island to get Marina, but struggles to command them.
49b	23b	"The Power of Attraction" "Les Lois de l'Attraction"	Andrès Fernandez	Pierre-Gilles Stehr; Xavier Vairé	Jérôme Fardini	July 25, 2016	TBA
When a crate of magnets lands on the island, Zig and Bernie try to use them to capture Marina.
49c	23c	"Choice Morsels" "Morceaux Choisis"	Andrès Fernandez	Pierre-Gilles Stehr; Xavier Vairé	Anh-tu Cao	July 25, 2016	TBA
Zig uses matter transporters which land on the island to try to catch Marina.
50a	24a	"Bubble-Gum"	Andrès Fernandez	Hugo Gittard	Anh-tu Cao	June 6, 2016	TBA
Zig and Bernie commandeer lost crates of bubble gum to capture Marina.
50b	24b	"Veggie Zig" "Végé-Zig"	Andrès Fernandez	Jean-Louis Momus	Jérôme Fardini	June 13, 2016	TBA
Sharko hypnotizes Zig to become a vegetarian; Marina finds him amusing and hangs out with him, making Sharko jealous.
50c	24c	"The Curse" "La Malédiction"	Andrès Fernandez	Boris Guilloteau; Laury Rovelli	Anh-tu Cao	June 13, 2016	TBA
The mummy offers Zig luck-controlling relics, but good or bad, they prove a real curse for him and everyone involved.
51a	25a	"DIY Sharko & Invisible Zig" "Brico Sharko"	Andrès Fernandez	Fred Felder; François Rosso	Laura Muller	August 1, 2016	TBA
Zig is covered with glue and sand while Sharko is trying to repair the sandcastle. He tries to use his newfound camouflage to get to Marina.
51b	25b	"Game, Set, and Match" "Jeu, Set et Match""	Andrès Fernandez	Hugo Gittard	Jérôme Fardini	August 1, 2016	TBA
After Sharko defeats Marina at ping-pong, Zig challenges him to a crooked game of tennis as a ploy to catch her.
51c	25c	"Heat Wave" "Coup de Chaud"	Andrès Fernandez	Andrès Fernandez	Anh-tu Cao	August 1, 2016	TBA
Hades' broken boiler wreaks havoc.
52a	26a	"The Proposal" "La Déclaration"	Andrès Fernandez	Boris Guilloteau; Laury Rovelli	Jérôme Fardini	August 8, 2016	TBA
Sharko plans on proposing to Marina, but Zig and Bernie keep ruining the moment by stealing the ring, hoping his inner conflict will keep him protecting Marina.
52b	26b	"Disco in the Dark" "Noir Dessin"	Andrès Fernandez	Boris Guilloteau	Cédric Dietsch	August 8, 2016	TBA
Zig finds a button that turns everything dark and opens a discoteque to trap Marina.
52c	26c	"The Toothpaste" "Le Dentifrice"	Andrès Fernandez	Andrès Fernandez	Cédric Dietsch	August 8, 2016	TBA
While Sharko is sleeping, Zig puts stinky cheese into his mouth; Sharko uses toothpaste to fix it.

=== Season 3 (2019–20) ===
A third season was announced in December 2018. In the third season, the main characters and the island's inhabitants move onto a cruise ship to travel the oceans, where much of the season's plots take place.

No. overall	No. in season	Title	Written by	Storyboard by	Original release date	U.S. air date
53a	1a	"Welcome on Board" "Bienvenue à Bord"	Andrés Fernandez	Andrés Fernandez	September 2, 2019	September 19, 2019
Zig has Bernie build a cruise ship to entice Marina into a trap. Sharko tags along with the island's inhabitants to stop his schemes, but the real danger is yet to come.
53b	1b	"Daddy Cool" "Bébé Zig"	Rémi Zaarour	Khalil Ben Naamane	September 2, 2019	September 19, 2019
Zig disguises himself as a cute little baby to get closer to Marina, but Sharko becomes attached to the "newborn".
53c	1c	"Nurse Marina" "Panique à l'Infirmerie"	Patrick Imbert	Lionel Brousse	September 2, 2019	November 27, 2020
Marina takes over the ship's nurse's duties on her vacation, but with Zig and Sharko as her "patients", her job becomes borderline impossible.
54a	2a	"Safety First" "Les Consignes de Sécurité"	Khalil Ben Naamane	Benjamin Culot	September 2, 2019	November 5, 2019
Sharko has his hands full both organizing safety training lessons for Marina and the other beachgoers and stopping Zig from seizing the mermaid.
54b	2b	"The Storm" "La Tempête"	Andrés Fernandez	Khalil Ben Naamane	September 2, 2019	TBA
A terrible storm hits the cruise ship, and it's up to Marina to keep the passengers safe while Sharko is seasick and amdist Zig's fanatical schemes.
53c	2c	"The Treasure Hunt" "La Chasse au Trésor"	Boris Guilloteau	Lionel Brousse	September 2, 2019	TBA
Zig creates a fake treasure map to trap Marina and Sharko that ultimately leads to the discovery of real treasure.
55a	3a	"Sharko My Hero" "Fan de Sharko"	Rémi Zaarour	Cédric Frémeaux	September 2, 2019	TBA
Sharko becomes a little swordfish's idol, but the child unwittingly interferes with his duties in an effort to emulate him.
55b	3b	"Under the Sea" "Sous l'Océan"	Rémi Zaarour	Lionel Brousse	September 2, 2019	TBA
A boating accident gives Sharko the chance to reconnect with his underwater roots, but he must help Marina repair the boat and keep Zig away from her.
55c	3c	"Do Not Disturb" "Ne Pas Deranger!"	Patrick Imbert	Benjamin Culot	September 2, 2019	TBA
Zig and Sharko have a restless night feuding over Marina, who gets more aggravated with each rude awakening.
56a	4a	"Blindman's Buff" "Attrape-moi si tu peux"	Laury Rovelli	François Reczulski	September 3, 2019	TBA
The whole gang play Blind Man's Bluff, and Zig, Sharko, and Bernie naturally turn the game into another chase.
56b	4b	"Zig the Gardener" "Zig la Main Verte"	Patrick Imbert	Benjamin Culot	September 3, 2019	TBA
Sharko and Marina garden together, but Zig's attacks lead to a mishap with her fertilizer and Bernie's carnvirous plant.
56c	4c	"Garbage Galore" "Le Grand Nettoyage"	Laury Rovelli	François Reczulski	September 3, 2019	November 8, 2019
Marina orders Sharko to clean up the island as punishment for littering, but the shark only makes bigger messes trying to stop Zig and Bernie.
57a	5a	"Freezing Buddies" "Congelés!"	Rémi Zaarour	Cédric Frémeaux	September 3, 2019	TBA
Zig and Sharko get stuck inside the kitchen's freezer.
57b	5b	"Frosty Friendship" "Amitié Glaciale"	Rémi Zaarour	Clément Girard	September 3, 2019	TBA
In the Arctic, Sharko and Marina befriend a penguin who is more than meets the eye.
57c	5c	"The Maze" "Le Labyrinthe"	Andrés Fernandez	Benjamin Culot	September 3, 2019	TBA
The group find themselves trapped in a literal maze of pipes and corridors in the ship's engine room after a chase.
58a	6a	"The Parsley" "Le Persil"	Laury Rovelli	Benjamin Culot	September 3, 2019	October 20, 2020
Marina unwittingly scares everyone off after some parsley gets stuck between her teeth. Worse for Sharko, Zig is the only one who isn't afraid.
58b	6b	"Viking Love" "Amour Viking"	Boris Guilloteau	Cédric Frémeaux	September 3, 2019	February 14, 2020
Olga the Terrible, a Viking chieftain, falls in love with Zig, who tries to take advantage of his new bodyguard to capture Marina.
58c	6c	"Hide and Squeek" "Marina, Où Es-Tu?"	Boris Guilloteau	Lionel Brousse	September 3, 2019	TBA
Zig interrupts Marina and Sharko's hide-and-seek game many times, and soon neither can find the mermaid when she mystriously disappears.
59a	7a	"The Invaders" "Les Envahisseurs"	Rémi Zaarour; Patrick Imbert	Clément Girard	September 4, 2019	TBA
Zig and Bernie try to capture Marina amidst a rat invasion she is fighting against, while Sharko struggles with his rat phobia.
59b	7b	"The Pranksters" "Farces et attrapes"	Boris Guilloteau	Lionel Brousse	September 4, 2019	TBA
Marina enlists Zig and Bernie's help to get the stone-faced Sharko to loosen to up to gags and pranks.
59c	7c	"Synchronized Swimming" "La Natation Synchronisée"	Boris Guilloteau	Anh-Tu Cao	September 4, 2019	TBA
Sharko's secret passion for synchronized swimming becomes his biggest shame when Zig tries to capture Marina using it.
60a	8a	"Spotless" "La Grande Lessive"	Patrick Imbert	Jérôme Pardini	September 4, 2019	TBA
Sharko has donned a special suit for a dinner date with Marina, but Zig and Bernie keep dirtying it to distract him.
60b	8b	"Old Buddies" "Les Vieux Copains"	Rémi Zaarour	Anh-Tu Cao	September 4, 2019	TBA
Sharko's old hooligan friends visit him, but Marina is extremely wary about those suspicious newcomers.
60b	8c	"A Hell of a Friend" "Un Ami d'Enfer"	Boris Guilloteau	Cédric Frémeaux	September 4, 2019	TBA
Hades invades the cruise to woo Marina, who along with her friends want nothing to do with him.
61a	9a	"Robot Craze" "La Folie des Robots"	Patrick Imbert	Alexandre Ulmann	September 4, 2019	TBA
Bernie dons Zig with a robot-suit to fight Sharko more efficently, but he fails until an accident gives a possible edge.
61b	9b	"Bionic Butler" "Service Deluxe"	Patrick Imbert	Clément Girard	September 5, 2019	TBA
Zig and Bernie put together a fake robot butler to get the hyena closer to Marina.
61b	9c	"Grounded!" "Echoués!"	Patrick Imbert	Cédric Frémeaux	September 5, 2019	TBA
When all the water in the world mysteriously dries up, Marina leads the gang on an investigation.
62a	10a	"The Kiss" "Le Bisou"	Patrick Imbert	Clément Girard	September 5, 2019	TBA
Zig takes inspiration from the story of the Frog Prince to catch Marina, but Sharko has his eye on its fateful kiss as well.
62b	10b	"A Beautiful Shell" "Belle Coquille"	Laury Rovelli	Anh-Tu Cao	September 5, 2019	TBA
After his shell breaks, Bernie decides that it is time for a new one.
62c	10c	"The Song of the Sirens" "Le Chant des Sirènes"	Laury Rovelli	Benjamin Culot	September 5, 2019	TBA
Marina does battle with a siren who threatens to take away all she holds dear with her captivating voice.
63a	11a	"Hats off to the Artist" "Salut l'Artiste"	Patrick Imbert	Jérôme Pardini	September 5, 2019	TBA
Marina enrolls in Bernie's art class, designed for Zig to capture her.
63b	11b	"A Star on Board!" "Star à Bord!"	Clément Savoyat	Anh-Tu Cao	September 5, 2019	TBA
Zig swipes a famous actor's mask to lure Marina into a trap.
63c	11c	"Operation Santa Claus" "Opération Père Noël"	Laury Rovelli	Lionel Brousse	September 5, 2019	TBA
As punishment for beating up Zig during his tenure as Santa Claus, Marina makes Sharko play the part.
64a	12a	"The Mermaid's Feast" "Le Festin de Marina"	Branca Cepelowicz	Benjamin Culot	September 5, 2019	TBA
Sharko forces Zig and Bernie to help him prepare a majestic dinner for Marina, whose hunger grows more and more insatiable.
64b	12b	"Atchoo!" "Atchoum"	Aude Massot	Yani Ouabdessedam	September 6, 2019	TBA
Marina and Sharko look after a fallen baby seagull, but the latter's sudden allergies give Zig leeway to get to the mermaid.
64c	12c	"Virtual Attraction" "Merveilles Virtuelles"	Rémi Zaarour	Clément Girard	September 6, 2019	TBA
Marina gets addicted to a VR headset Zig originally intended to offer Sharko.
65a	13a	"Rockstar Marina" "Marina Star du Rock"	Patrick Imbert	Cédric Frémeaux	September 6, 2019	TBA
Marina decides to form a rock band, but Sharko struggles to find his talent.
65b	13b	"The Fitness Session" "Les Joies de la Gym"	Aude Massot	Anh-Tu Cao	September 6, 2019	TBA
Zig becomes the group's fitness coach at the gym, to Sharko's horror.
65c	13c	"Sharko's Best Friend" "Le Meilleur Ami de Sharko"	Boris Guilloteau	Cédric Frémeaux	September 6, 2019	TBA
Sharko befriends a cute pink alien named Blobi, but neglects both his voracious appetite and Zig's frantic warnings.
66a	14a	"Zig's Shadow" "L'Ombre de Zig"	Boris Guilloteau	Benjamin Culot	November 14, 2019	TBA
Bernie brings Zig's shadow to life with a strange camera, and they both fight Sharko to get Marina.
66b	14b	"The Nap" "La Sieste"	Laury Rovelli	Anh-Tu Cao	November 21, 2019	TBA
Marina, Zig, Sharko and Bernie share a memory about naptime from their early childhood.
66c	14c	"Sink or Swim" "Tous à l'Eau"	Clément Savoyat	Jérôme Pardini	November 21, 2019	TBA
Marina enrolls for a swimming race, with Sharko as her coach and Zig as a surprise rival.
67a	15a	"A Ball on the Loose" "Le Ballon Perdu"	Patrick Imbert	Lionel Brousse	November 21, 2019	TBA
Sharko and Marina race all over the ship to retrieve a little fish's lost toy ball. Meanwhile, plenty of new opportunities arise for Zig and Bernie to capture Marina.
67b	15b	"A Castle Built for Two" "Un Château pour Deux"	Laury Rovelli	Clement Girard	November 21, 2019	TBA
Zig, Sharko, and Marina unwittingly intrude on Bernie and the Starfish's date in their mini-castle.
67c	15c	"The Serenade" "La Sérénade"	Clement Savoyat	Christophe Pinto	November 21, 2019	TBA
Sharko wants to serenade Marina, but Zig and Bernie ruin every attempt.
68a	16a	"Best Girlfriends" "Une Nouvelle Meilleure Amie"	Boris Guilloteau	Cedric Guarneri	November 21, 2019	TBA
When Zig disguises himself as a little girl to lure Marina into a trap, Sharko must find a way to overcome the resulting gender restrictions.
68b	16b	"My Buddy Bigfoot" "Mon Ami le Yéti"	Aude Massot	Antoine Rota	November 28, 2019	TBA
Zig allies with a yeti from the Arctic Circle to finally defeat Sharko and capture Marina.
68c	16c	"A Brother's Tiff" "Frères Ennemis"	Remi Zaarour	Matilde Prevost	November 28, 2019	TBA
Zig and Bernie have another spat, but struggle to get by without the other.
69a	17a	"The Diving Contest" "Le Plus Beau Plongeon"	Aude Massot	Yani Ouabdessedam	November 28, 2019	TBA
Zig and an acrophobic Sharko sign up for a diving contest, where the winner gets to dine privately with Captain Marina.
69b	17b	"The Elevator Trip" "Promenade en Ascenseur"	Laury Rovelli	Christophe Pinto	November 28, 2019	TBA
Zig and Marina are stuck inside a broken elevator, and their friends have to get them out before Zig eats her.
69c	17c	"Childhood Treasure" "Un Trésor d'Enfance"	Laury Rovelli	Jerome Pardini	November 28, 2019	TBA
When Sharko accidentally breaks Marina's treasured music box, he tries to make up for it while dealing with Zig and Bernie.
70a	18a	"Foggy Day" "Jour de Brume"	Boris Guilloteau	Cedric Fremeaux	November 28, 2019	TBA
Bernie builds a device to cover the ship in a thick fog to capture Marina, but Sharko is one step ahead of him and Zig.
70b	18b	"The Rival" "Le Rival"	Patrick Imbert	Lionel Brousse	November 28, 2019	TBA
Another muscular shark named Sharky arrives and forms a rivalry with Sharko.
70c	18c	"Sharko on Ice" "Danse Givrée"	Aude Massot	Benjamin Culot	November 28, 2019	TBA
Sharko must overcome his clumsiness on the Artic's ice to defeat Zig and save Marina.
71a	19a	"The Mime" "Le Mime"	Patrick Imbert	Boris Guilloteau	November 28, 2019	TBA
Sharko is bugged by a mime who won't stop following him.
71b	19b	"Mobilemania" "Téléphonemania"	Boris Guilloteau	Boris Guilloteau	November 28, 2019	TBA
Sharko gets hooked on his new cell phone, giving Zig and Bernie new chances to capture Marina.
71c	19c	"Banana Peel" "Peau de Banane"	Boris Guilloteau	Benjamin Culot	December 4, 2019	TBA
Sharko is plagued by banana peels as part of Zig and Bernie's latest scheme.
72a	20a	"Saturday Night Dance" "Le Bal du Samedi Soir"	Patrick Imbert	Christophe Pinto	December 4, 2019	TBA
The ship's ball is anything but peaceful when Zig infiltrates it to capture Marina from Sharko.
72b	20b	"The Clairvoyant" "La Voyante"	Boris Guilloteau; Branca Cepelowicz	Clément Girard	December 4, 2019	TBA
Sharko is driven into a paranoid frenzy when a fortune teller predicts Zig will finally eat Marina.
72c	20c	"Lost at Sea" "Perdus en Mer"	Rémi Zaarour; Boris Guilloteau	Christophe Pinto	December 11, 2019	TBA
Zig and Sharko get stranded at sea after another fight. Meanwhile, Bernie plays chess with Marina, who proves a surprisingly talentes player.
73a	21a	"The Power of the Cape" "Cape ou Pas Cape!"	Clément Savoyat	Anh-Tu Cao	December 11, 2019	TBA
Zig and Bernie steal Hades' magic cape to capture Marina, but the hyena struggles to control it.
73b	21b	"The Rare Bird" "L'Oiseau Rare"	Clément Savoyat	Clément Savoy	December 11, 2019	TBA
Zig and Bernie tail Marina and Sharko on the island as they search for the mysterious avian Kakaput.
73c	21c	"Deafening Noise" "Un Boucan d'Enfer"	Pascal David	Benjamin Culot	December 11, 2019	TBA
Sharko's hearing is damaged while chasing Zig, giving him an edge.
74a	22a	"Daddy Bernie" "Papa Bernie"	Clément Savoyat	Boris Guilloteau	December 11, 2019	TBA
Bernie's age-changing ray gun turns Sharko, Marina, and Zig into babies, and he must look after them while he fixes it.
74b	22b	"A Pearl for My Girl" "Perle Rare"	Aude Massot	Guillaume Picard	December 11, 2019	TBA
Sharko must fight off Zig and Bernie to offer a huge, sparkling pearl to Marina, hoping to win her heart with it.
74c	22c	"The Boating Licence" "Le Permis Bateau"	Pascal David	Benjamin Culot	December 18, 2019	TBA
Marina and Sharko try to educate Aldo the looney pilot on how to drive the boat amist Zig's schemes.
75a	23a	"North Pole Movie" "Film au Pôle Nord"	Pascal David	Cedric Fremeaux	December 18, 2019	TBA
Marina and Sharko try to make a documentary about penguins in Antartica, but Zig and Bernie aren't far behind.
75b	23b	"A Pie Dream" "Un Rêve de Tartes"	Remi Zaarour	Guillaume Picard	December 18, 2019	TBA
Sharko is thrououghly embarrassed after getting pied, and the key to overcoming his childhood trauma once and for all lies in his dreams.
75c	23c	"Wide Awake" "La Grosse Fatigue"	Pascal David	Olivier Dernyck	December 25, 2019	TBA
Zig and Bernie keep Sharko up all night, resulting in him becoming a tired wreck unable to watch over Marina properly.
76a	24a	"A Heroic Tale" "Un Récit Héroïque"	Benjamin Culot	Patrick Imbert	December 25, 2019	TBA
Zig, Sharko, and Bernie argue over the tale of who rescued the ship from a dangerous accident to a litle swordfish.
76b	24b	"Replicas" "Duplicata"	Patrick Imbert	Christophe Pinto	January 1, 2020	TBA
Bernie creates a machine that generates rubber replicas of real people. Zig tries to use them to grab Marina from Sharko amidst a visit from Poseidon.
76c	24c	"Mechanical Jaws" "Mâchoire Mécanique"	Branca Cepelowicz; Cedric Dietsch	Christophe Pinto	January 8, 2020	TBA
Zig and Bernie use a little device that gives them control over Sharko's jaws, and make him attack anyone and anything in sight, including Marina.
77a	25a	"The Crosswalk" "Le Passage Piéton"	Boris Guilloteau	Olivier Dernyck	January 15, 2020	TBA
Marina and Sharko attempt to help an old tortoise across a dangerous crosswalk at a stopover.
77b	25b	"The Cloud" "Le Nuage"	Laury Rovelli	Cedric Fremeaux	January 22, 2020	TBA
A lightning bolt from a mysterious green cloud strikes the ship's clock, causing everyone's ages to get messed up.
77c	25c	"The Captain's Evening" "La Soirée du Capitaine"	Khalil Ben Naamane	Guillaume Picard	January 29, 2020	TBA
Sharko is determined that Marina adheres her special captain's evening, but all she wants to do is stargaze.
78a	26a	"Game Over"	Patrick Imbert	Alexandre Ulmann	February 5, 2020	TBA
Sharko becomes addicted to a video game in the arcade, leaving his girlfriend vulnerable to Zig.
78b	26b	"Titazig"	Cedric Dietsch; Branca Cepelowicz	Cedric Dietsch	February 12, 2020	TBA
Inspired by Titanic, Sharko tries to recreate a familiar romantic scene with Marina from the movie.
78c	26c	"Poseidon's Visit" "La Visite de Poséidon"	Khalil Ben Naamane; Branca Cepelowicz	Clement Savoyat	February 19, 2020	TBA
Sharko must stop Poseidon from accidentally wedding off Marina to Zig, disguised as a royal merman.

=== Season 4 (2023–24) ===
A fourth season was announced in October 2022 and first aired in September 2023 on K2. The fourth season revolves around Marina and her magic shoes, which can make the person wearing them bend and stretch their legs to its extremes.

Note that the episode ordering given below is currently only applicable for residents in France or for Europeans, since non-French/European services which hosts the show (i.e., the official Zig & Sharko YouTube channel, or the Indian Nickelodeon Sonic TV channel) offer episodes in an ordering which heavily contrasts with the one in this list. For example, "Shoe Fly" is considered as the first episode instead of being the third, and "If the Shoe Fits" (Part 1 and 2) are ordered as the second and third episodes instead of being the first and second episodes, respectively.

No. overall	No. in season	Title	Directed by	Written by	Storyboarded by	Original release date	U.S. air date
79a	1a	"If the Shoe Fits (Part 1)" "Un Grand pas pour Marina (Volet 1)"	Yani Ouabdesselam; Nicolas Bouyard	Hugo Gittard	Nicolas Bouyard	November 6, 2023	December 1, 2023
A magic fish enchants a pair of sandals that, when worn by Marina, gives her enchanted legs.
79b	1b	"If the Shoe Fits (Part 2)" "Un Grand pas Pour Marina (Volet 2)"	Yani Ouabdesselam; Nicolas Bouyard	Hugo Gittard	Yani Ouabdesselam	November 6, 2023	December 1, 2023
Marina instantly gets used to her new enchanted legs, making it difficult for Sharko to keep up with her and giving Zig the opportunity to catch Marina.
79c	1c	"Shoe Fly" "Dans la Boîte"	Yani Ouabdesselam; Nicolas Bouyard	Hugo Gittard	Yani Ouabdesselam	November 6, 2023	TBA
Zig plans to use the magic sandals to catch Marina.
80a	2a	"Tough as Nails" "Vernis mon Beau Vernis"	Yani Ouabdesselam; Nicolas Bouyard	Mathilde Belin	Guillaume Picard	November 6, 2023	TBA
When Sharko gets brand new nails, he must choose between his new nails or saving Marina from Zig.
80b	2b	"Patching Things Up" "Rebouche Trou"	Yani Ouabdesselam; Nicolas Bouyard	Mathilde Belin	Fanny Regeste Mistral	November 14, 2023	TBA
After Marina causes a giant hole to appear in the beach, she and Sharko uses different methods to patch the hole up, but Zig and Bernie keep getting in the way.
80c	2c	"Don't Tell Dad" "Cher Papa"	Yani Ouabdesselam; Nicolas Bouyard	Hugo Gittard	Romain Cislo	November 7, 2023	TBA
When her father Poseidon visits, Marina and Sharko try to keep the magic sandals a secret from him.
81a	3a	"Wacky Wand" "Zig À La Baguette"	Yani Ouabdesselam; Nicolas Bouyard	Alice Giordan; Léo Bocard	Julien Thompson	November 9, 2023	TBA
Zig is given his own magic wand, which he uses to try to catch Marina.
81b	3b	"Marina to the Rescue" "Super Vigie"	Yani Ouabdesselam; Nicolas Bouyard	Mathilde Belin	Romain Cislo	November 8, 2023	TBA
Marina becomes the new hero on the beach, causing Sharko to doubt himself, but it's all part of Zig's latest plan to catch Marina.
81c	3c	"Stradding the Equator" "Chevauchée Sous Les Tropiques"	Yani Ouabdesselam; Nicolas Bouyard	Hugo Gittard	Julien Thompson	November 9, 2023	TBA
When Marina dreams of wanting to explore the island like the Wild West, Zig and Sharko use a horse costume to make Marina's dream a reality.
82a	4a	"Stinky Slides" "Des Claquettes Pas Nettes"	Yani Ouabdesselam; Nicolas Bouyard	Branca Cepelowicz; Julien Dinse	Fanny Regeste Mistral	November 7, 2023	TBA
Sharko and Zig work together to get Marina to give the sandals a bath after they develop a nasty smell.
82b	4b	"Freewheeling" "En Roue Libre"	Yani Ouabdesselam; Nicolas Bouyard	Isabelle Lenoble	Lucas Pinatel	November 6, 2023	TBA
When Sharko tries to teach Marina rollerblade safety, Zig does awesome tricks to distract her in his latest plan to catch her.
82c	4c	"Shark Bitten" "Moustigre"	Yani Ouabdesselam; Nicolas Bouyard	Hugo Gittard	Guillaume Picard	November 9, 2023	TBA
When he sees that Sharko gets a allergic reaction after getting bitten, Zig has the Fairy Godfish turn him into a mosquito.
83a	5a	"A Close Shave" "Au Poil"	Yani Ouabdesselam; Nicolas Bouyard	Branca Cepelowicz; Julien Dinse	Julien Thompson	November 10, 2023	TBA
Bernie creates a formula that causes hair to grow on Sharko.
83b	5b	"Shuffle Slides" "Clac Claquettes"	Yani Ouabdesselam; Nicolas Bouyard	Mathilde Belin	Manon Ollivier	November 13, 2023	TBA
Marina takes up irish step dancing and Zig decides to use it in his latest plan to catch her.
83c	5c	"What Are You Expecting?" "Un Heureux Événement"	Yani Ouabdesselam; Nicolas Bouyard	Nicolas Gallet	Céline Gobinet	November 14, 2023	TBA
In his latest plan to eat Marina, Zig dresses up as a pregnant woman and Sharko who's onto his plan does the same.
84a	6a	"It Wasn't Me!" "C'est Pas Moi C'est Lui"	Yani Ouabdesselam; Nicolas Bouyard	Alice Giordan; Léo Bocard	Céline Gobinet	November 10, 2023	January 25, 2024
When Poseidon shrinks Zig and puts him in a bottle after Sharko blames him for breaking a statue, Bernie and Marina work together to free Zig from his bottle prison, but Sharko ruins their attempts when he fears that Zig will eat Marina once she frees him.
84b	6b	"Not Without My Slides" "Jamais Sans Mes Claquettes"	Yani Ouabdesselam; Nicolas Bouyard	Olivier Pouchelon	Julien Thompson	November 7, 2023	TBA
When a restaurant bans Marina because of the sandals, Zig and Bernie decides to put up various signs to ban Sharko.
84c	6c	"Head in the Clouds" "Ça Vole Haut"	Yani Ouabdesselam; Nicolas Bouyard	Isabelle Lenoble	Manon Ollivier	November 9, 2023	February 22, 2024
When Marina loses a kite, she gets help from a cloud to get it back but it's being controlled by Zig and Bernie.
85a	7a	"Match Point" "Balle De Match"	Yani Ouabdesselam; Nicolas Bouyard	Alice Giordan; Léo Bocard	Guillaume Picard	November 10, 2023	TBA
Marina and Sharko play a game of volleyball, but when Zig and Bernie join, it turns into a competition.
85b	7b	"For Better or for Worse" "Pour Le Pire Et Le Meilleur"	Yani Ouabdesselam; Nicolas Bouyard	Hugo Gittard	Yann Provost	November 13, 2023	TBA
85c	7c	"Slide Show" "Blagounettes"	Yani Ouabdesselam; Nicolas Bouyard	Isabelle Lenoble	Céline Gobinet	November 13, 2023	TBA
Marina uses one of her legs like a sock puppet to entertain Sharko, but he soon gets annoyed by it.
86a	8a	"The Slide Trail" "À La Trace"	Yani Ouabdesselam; Nicolas Bouyard	Mathilde Belin	Romain Cislo	November 13, 2023	TBA
While kickboxing Marina by accident loses one of the sandals, so she and Sharko go into the jungle to search for it.
86b	8b	"The Last Yoghurt" "Le Dernier Yaourt"	Yani Ouabdesselam; Nicolas Bouyard	Mathilde Belin	Romain Cislo	November 14, 2023	TBA
When Bernie takes a picture of Sharko supposedly eating the last yoghurt he tries to prevent Marina from seeing it.
86c	8c	"Clowning Around" "Un Vrai Cauchemar"	Yani Ouabdesselam; Nicolas Bouyard	Nicolas Gallet	Guillaume Picard	November 10, 2023	TBA
After discovering that Sharko is afraid of clowns, Zig has himself and Marina look like clowns in his latest plan to eat her.
87a	9a	"Santa Mix Up" "Un Père Noël Étourdi"	Yani Ouabdesselam; Nicolas Bouyard	Hugo Gittard	Yann Provost	December 25, 2023	December 22, 2023
87b	9b	"Sharko-Sapiens" "Sharko-Magnon"	Yani Ouabdesselam; Nicolas Bouyard	Nicolas Gallet	Manon Ollivier	November 15, 2023	TBA
Marina brings back from the ice a prehistoric shark which is none other than Sharko's ancestor. Hungry, the latter wants to eat Zig, it really suits Sharko who can finally rest for five minutes and let his ancestor do his job.
87c	9c	"Like Cat and Dog" "Comme Chien et Chat"	Yani Ouabdesselam; Nicolas Bouyard	Sidonie Traverse	Guillaume Picard	November 8, 2023	TBA
While observing Marina cuddling her sandals, Bernie gets the idea to disguise Zig as a cat: Marina and Sharko immediately fall for the cute kitten. Only the tap dancers saw Zig put on his costume! And when they chase him away, they get scolded!
88a	10a	"Finders Keepers" "Essayer C'est Adopter"	Yani Ouabdesselam; Nicolas Bouyard	Alice Giordan; Léo Bocard	Caroline Torreli	November 8, 2023	TBA
88b	10b	"Gulp!" "Gloups!"	Yani Ouabdesselam; Nicolas Bouyard	Nicolas Gallet	Guillaume Picard	November 14, 2023	TBA
88c	10c	"A Thousand Leaks" "La Fuite De Trop"	Yani Ouabdesselam; Nicolas Bouyard	Hugo Gittard	Manon Ollivier	November 8, 2023	TBA
89a	11a	"Padding Pool" "Petit Bassin"	Yani Ouabdesselam; Nicolas Bouyard	Hugo Gittard	Romain Cislo	November 15, 2023	TBA
Marina and Sharko discover that tap dancers can't swim. The shark decides to teach them, but Zig and Bernie create dangerous situations so that Marina idiotically loses confidence in Sharko.
89b	11b	"Marina the Explorer" "Marina l'exploratrice"	Yani Ouabdesselam; Nicolas Bouyard	Hugo Gittard	Guillaume Picard	November 15, 2023	TBA
89c	11c	"Brand New Teeth" "Croque-Madame"	Yani Ouabdesselam; Nicolas Bouyard	Nicolas Gallet	Manon Ollivier	November 16, 2023	TBA
90a	12a	"Pyjama Party" "Soirée Pyjama"	Yani Ouabdesselam; Nicolas Bouyard	Sidonie Traverse	Julien Thompson	November 16, 2023	December 29, 2023
90b	12b	"Ready, Steady, Go!" "Rien Ne Sert De Courir"	Yani Ouabdesselam; Nicolas Bouyard	Mathilde Belin	Romain Cislo	November 17, 2023	TBA
90c	12c	"Welcome to Mermaid Island" "Si C'était Une Sirène"	Yani Ouabdesselam; Nicolas Bouyard	Alice Giordan; Léo Bocard	Julien Thompson	November 17, 2023	TBA
91a	13a	"Wiped Out" "Gomme Tout"	Yani Ouabdesselam; Nicolas Bouyard	Hugo Gittard	Romain Cislo	December 25, 2023	TBA
91b	13b	"Egg Hunt" "Chasse Aux Œufs"	Yani Ouabdesselam; Nicolas Bouyard	Alice Giordan; Léo Bocard	Caroline Lefevre	December 25, 2023	TBA
91c	13c	"Sunburn" "Coup De Soleil"	Yani Ouabdesselam; Nicolas Bouyard	Nicolas Gallet	Caroline Lefevre	December 25, 2023	TBA
92a	14a	"It's Bedtime!" "Allez Dodo!"	Yani Ouabdesselam; Nicolas Bouyard	Hugo Gittard	Caroline Lefevre	December 25, 2023	TBA
92b	14b	"Zig Spaced" "Zig De L'espace"	Yani Ouabdesselam; Nicolas Bouyard	Hugo Gittard	Manon Ollivier	December 6, 2023	TBA
92c	14c	"Thanks You, Mom" "Merci Maman!"	Yani Ouabdesselam; Nicolas Bouyard	Nicolas Gallet	Julien Thompson	December 26, 2023	TBA
93a	15a	"Pirate Law" "La Loi Pirate"	Yani Ouabdesselam; Nicolas Bouyard	Sidonie Traverse	Guillaume Picard	December 26, 2023	TBA
Followed by Zig, Marina and Sharko find treasure on a pirate galleon. Furious that they have desecrated his loot, the captain's ghost challenges them: three tests to pass within a time limit to win the treasure and their freedom!
93b	15b	"Marina Munchies Express" "Marina Livraison Express"	Yani Ouabdesselam; Nicolas Bouyard	Léa Cousty; Anh-tu Cao	Guillaume Picard	December 26, 2023	TBA
Marina and Sharko take care of delivering dishes on the boat: the shark is in the kitchen, the mermaid is in charge of delivery. Zig and Bernie take the opportunity to order, hoping to eat Marina in the process...
93c	15c	"The Last Figurine" "La Dernière Figurine"	Yani Ouabdesselam; Nicolas Bouyard	Mathilde Belin	Romain Cislo	January 8, 2024	December 15, 2023
