= Mark Mahon (director) =

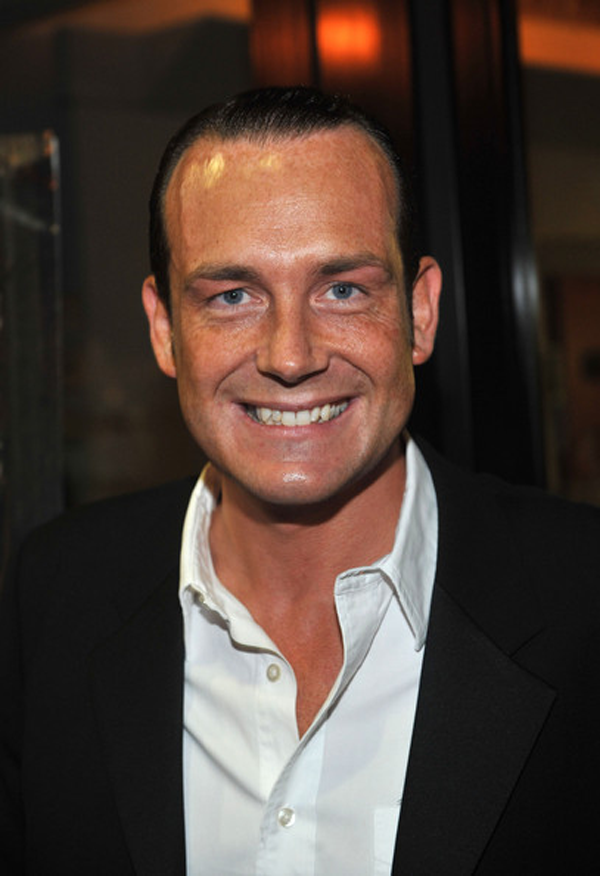
- Mark Mahon in New York
- Born: Mark John Mahon; 1 April 1973 (age 53); Cork City, Ireland
- Occupations: Director, writer, producer
- Years active: 2000–present

Mark Mahon (born 1 April 1973) is an Irish film director, writer and producer from Cork city, Ireland.

At the age of 22, Mahon was severely injured in an accident and spent several months in hospital recovering. During this time, he started writing. He wrote several screenplays, one novel and one graphic novel called Freedom Within the Heart, which as an unproduced screenplay, won Best Screenplay at the 2005 Action on Film International Film Festival. He subsequently set up a film production company, Maron Pictures.

In 2007, Mahon directed his first feature-length film Strength and Honour starring Michael Madsen and Vinnie Jones. It was released on 20 November 2007 in Ireland and was tested on a limited capacity in the United States on 7 December 2007. As a producer on the film, Mahon was nominated for a "Rising Star Award" at the 2008 Irish Film and Television Awards.

In May 2013, Mahon was reportedly launching a graphic novel about Brian Boru, Freedom Within The Heart. At the same time, Mahon expressed plans to make a movie of the same title.
