= Still Alice (soundtrack) =

Still Alice (Original Motion Picture Soundtrack)

Soundtrack album by Ilan Eshkeri
- Released: January 13, 2015
- Recorded: 2014
- Genre: Film score
- Length: 23:07
- Label: Nettwerk Music Group
- Producer: Ilan Eshkeri

Ilan Eshkeri chronology
Get Santa (2014)	Still Alice (2015)	Black Sea (2015)

Still Alice (Original Motion Picture Soundtrack) is the soundtrack album composed by Ilan Eshkeri to the 2014 film Still Alice directed by Richard Glatzer and Wash Westmoreland starring Julianne Moore, Alec Baldwin, Kristen Stewart, Kate Bosworth and Hunter Parrish. The album was released through Nettwerk Music Group on January 13, 2015.

== Development ==
Still Alice features an original score composed by Ilan Eshkeri; he accepted the offer despite his busy schedule, as he could relate to the subject of Alzheimer's disease. Eshkeri his friends Mat Whitecross and Tim Wheeler lost their fathers' to Alzheimer's within a span of few months. This led him to work on Whitecross' feature film Ashes (2012) and Wheeler's solo album Lost Domain (2014), which came from their experiences, while also collaborated on the Alzheimer's Society charity. He considered the subject close to his heart while also having an "incredible cast" and complimented Westmoreland's and Glatzer's "compelling enthusiasm".

Eshkeri added that the score had an "emotional and intellectual starting point" while composing; he was hesitant to dwell on the intellectual side as it matters if the music connects emotionally and tried to create boundaries and concepts from where to start with. He discussed using the piano with the directors as an instrument of the home and it helped to express Alice's family life. It was more of a personal instrument for Alice with her complexity and multi-faceted journey, prompted him to express her needs through different instruments. Eshkeri discussed with the directors on using a string quartet and recorded it in a way which would feel intimate and allow the audience to completely focus on the individual performance.

Ultimately, Eshkeri used a string trio as it was difficult to write music for an ensemble. Writing in three parts, with only three instruments, each musician has to play a different note from the others to make a complete chord. "The challenge of that, the idea that sometimes I might be forced into incomplete harmony where something is missing, to me represented the disease in some way", Eshkeri added while further denoting an aesthetic sense when a group of notes becomes more than the sum of parts make him musically express the emotions he tried to achieve and is the only way is to expand more on the imaginary level as each emotion in the film were extremely complex.

== Reception ==
Pete Simons of Synchrotones wrote "Fans of romantic minimalism may find that Ilan Eshkeri's "Still Alice" fits quite nicely in this line up. Minimalism is a term often mis-used, including by myself. Still, there is very little to Eshkeri's score. Short, simple themes. Four instruments. It feels naked... it feels exposed. Any lesser composer would've felt the need to dress it up with a string section – at least. Everything hinges on those four players; and on Eshkeri's notes. There is nowhere for the composer or the musicians to hide. And they don't need to. This is a beautiful piece of work; one that gets under your skin. Clearly a labour of love."

Sean Wilson of Mfiles wrote "Although Ilan Eshkeri's approach with Still Alice is hardly revolutionary or unexpected, it's still an effective one for the film in question. The composer's choice of a small ensemble led largely by piano and strings avoids schmaltz and instead captures the poignancy of Alice's story. Yet at the same time, it's also tinged with a sense of love and caring, reminding us of the importance of Alice's family in times of great distress. It's a brief soundtrack but a quietly powerful one, restrained enough to avoid earnestness but direct enough to work on the heartstrings. It's a reminder of Eshkeri's talent for melody and listeners with a penchant for small-scale, gentle scores would do well to check it out."

Anthony Lane of The New Yorker stated "[the] score, by Ilan Eshkeri, urges mourning upon us with slow-paced piano and strings". Dana Stevens of Slate described the score as "unsettling". Matt Patches of IGN wrote "Ilan Eshkeri's score streaks Moore's interior across the exterior, giving Alzheimer's a musical face." Peter Debruge of Variety described it "a score from British composer Ilan Eshkeri that doesn't tell you how to feel, but rather how she feels: lost, emotional and anxious most of the time." David Edelstein of Vulture wrote "Still Alice has an exceptionally lovely, yearning score by Ilan Eshkeri for violin, viola, cello, and piano". Mark Jenkins of NPR wrote "composer Ilan Eshkeri's tremulous violins, ape [Krzysztof] Penderecki during Alice's most agitated moments."

Tim Grierson of Screen International wrote "Occasionally, though, Ilan Eshkeri's score can become a little self-consciously frenetic, a clumsy attempt to echo Alice's panic at her worsening memory loss." Rochelle Siemienowicz of SBS called it "a predictably melancholy piano and strings score". Josh Kupecki of The Austin Chronicle called it a "cloying score". Sky Hirschkron of The Film Stage wrote "Ilan Eshkeri‘s musical score strains for emotion when doing so is entirely unnecessary." Ed Gonzalez of Slant Magazine denoted it an "intrusively maudlin score".

== Live performances ==
Eshkeri conducted a charity concert for the Alzheimer's Society on October 25, 2015, at the St Leonard's, Shoreditch where he performed the musical score along with a newly composed score suite performed by the same string trio.

== Track listing ==
No.	Title	Length
1.	"L.A. Drive"	0:48
2.	"No Secrets"	0:48
3.	"Running"	2:03
4.	"Alice Tells the Children"	0:54
5.	"Beach"	1:06
6.	"Words with Friends"	0:50
7.	"Butterfly"	1:37
8.	"Lost Phone"	1:21
9.	"Speech"	2:35
10.	"Pills"	3:04
11.	"Toothpaste"	1:32
12.	"Souls Rising"	1:25
13.	"It Was About Love"	0:47
14.	"If I Had a Boat" (Karen Elson)	4:17
Total length:		23:07
