= The Advance-Guard, or The Military Sacrifice =

1890 painting by Frederic Remington

The Advance-Guard, or The Military Sacrifice (The Ambush)
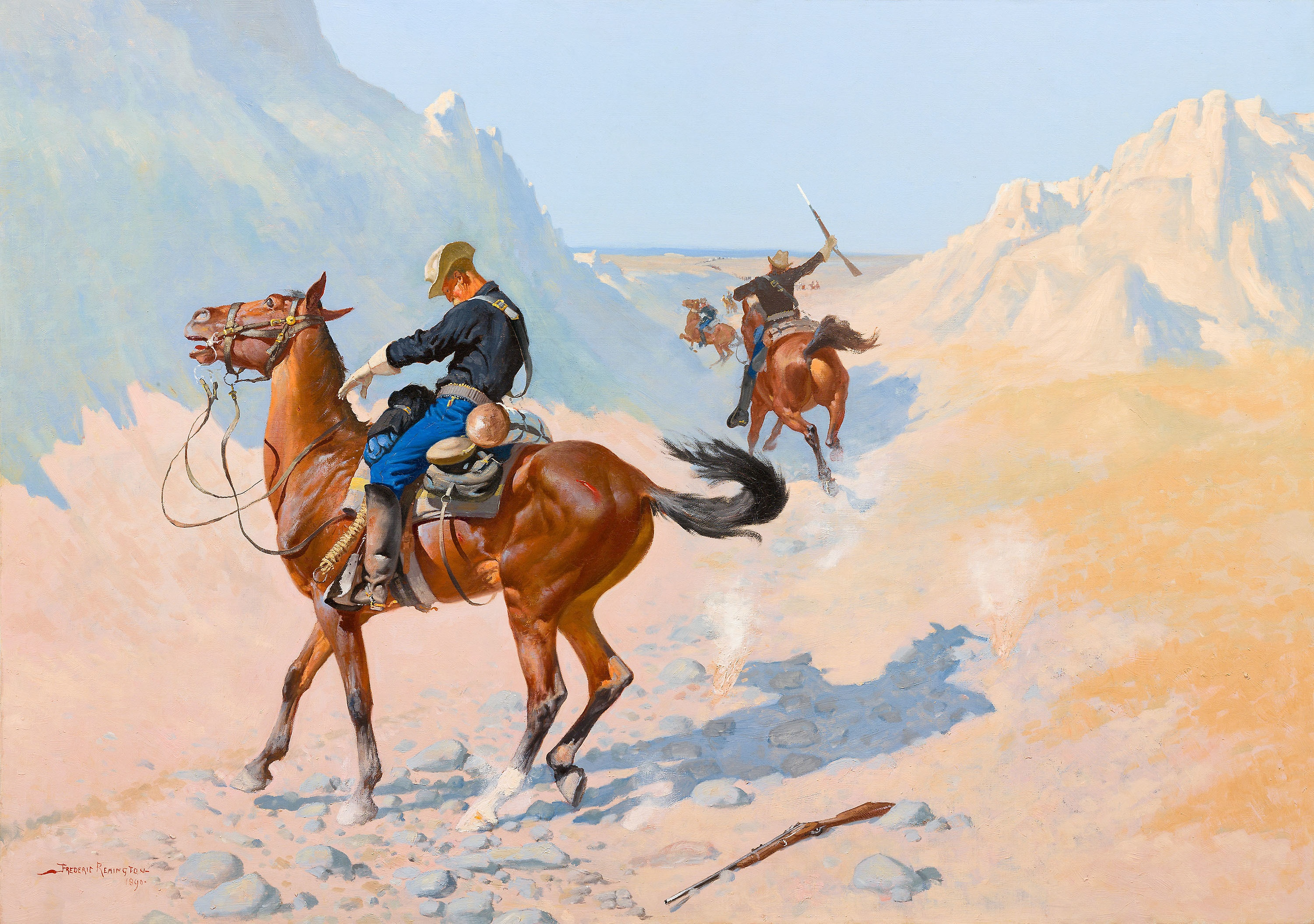
- Artist: Frederic Remington
- Year: 1890
- Medium: Oil on canvas
- Dimensions: 87.3 cm × 123.1 cm (34.4 in × 48.5 in)
- Location: Art Institute of Chicago, Chicago
- Accession: 1982.802

The Advance-Guard, or The Military Sacrifice (The Ambush) is an 1890 oil painting by Frederic Remington.

== Description ==
The painting depicts a cavalry scout slumping over his horse after being shot by an unseen Sioux warrior in ambush. Behind the scout are other mounted troops who are fleeing the ambush.

== Provenance ==
In an auction of 1893 led by Thomas Ellis Kirby at the American Art Association, the painting was sold to E. H. Wales for US$250. It was acquired by the George F. Harding Museum some time before 1982. In 1982, ownership was transferred to the Art Institute of Chicago.
