= Gagosian Gallery =

Contemporary and modern art gallery with multiple locations

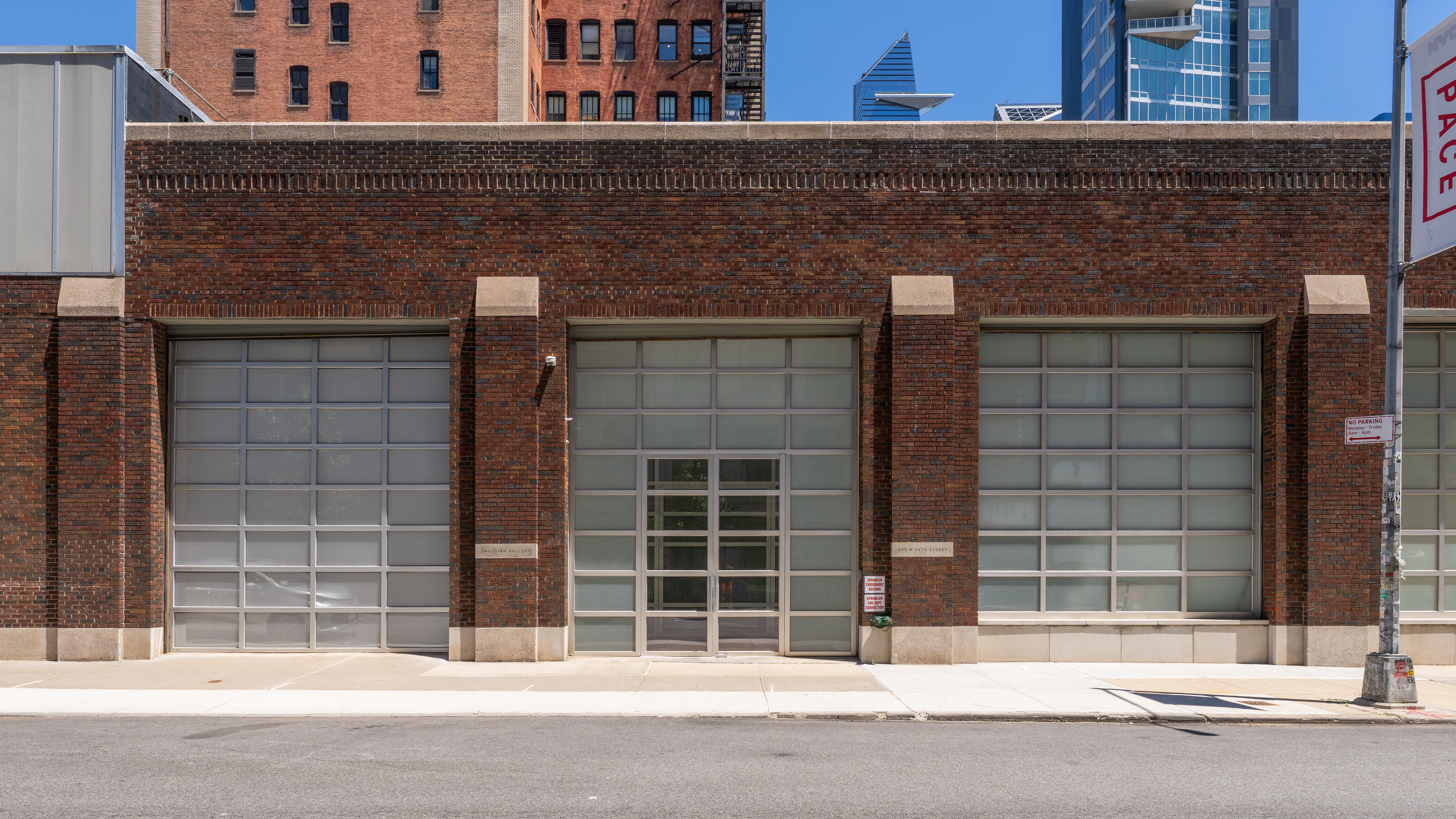
- West 24th Street Gagosian Gallery in Manhattan, New York City
- Established: 1980; 46 years ago
- Location: New York; Beverly Hills; London; Paris; Le Bourget; Basel; Gstaad; Rome; Athens; Hong Kong
- Type: Art gallery
- Owner: Larry Gagosian
- Website: gagosian.com

Gagosian Gallery is a modern and contemporary art gallery owned and directed by Larry Gagosian. The gallery exhibits some of the most well-known artists of the 20th and 21st centuries. As of 2024, Gagosian employs 300 people at 19 exhibition spaces – including New York City, London, Paris, Basel, Beverly Hills, San Francisco, Rome, Athens, Geneva, and Hong Kong – designed by architects such as Caruso St John, Richard Gluckman, Richard Meier, Jean Nouvel, and Annabelle Selldorf.

In 2011, a survey of art dealers by The Wall Street Journal estimated that Gagosian Gallery had annual sales of about $1 billion. In May 2011 alone, half the works for evening sale by major auction houses in New York City were by artists represented by the gallery.

== History and expansion ==
=== 1980s ===
Larry Gagosian opened his first gallery in Los Angeles in 1980, showing the work of young contemporary artists such as Eric Fischl and Jean-Michel Basquiat.

The business expanded from Los Angeles to New York: In 1989, a new, spacious gallery opened on the Upper East Side of Manhattan at 980 Madison Avenue, with the inaugural exhibition The Maps of Jasper Johns. The Gagosian Gallery in New York City mounted exhibitions dedicated to the history of The New York School, Abstract expressionism, and Pop art by showing early work of Robert Rauschenberg, Roy Lichtenstein, and Willem de Kooning. During its first two years, the Madison Avenue space, once used by Sotheby's and Parke-Bernet, presented work by Yves Klein, Andy Warhol, Cy Twombly, and Jackson Pollock. Artists such as Walter De Maria, Francesco Clemente, and Peter Halley were represented by Gagosian.

=== 1990s ===
Gagosian Gallery's second New York City location opened in the SoHo neighborhood, in 1991. During the same year, the gallery convinced artists David Salle and Philip Taaffe to switch representation from long-term relationships with the Mary Boone Gallery to Gagosian. The SoHo location showed younger artists such as Ellen Gallagher, Jenny Saville, Douglas Gordon and Cecily Brown.

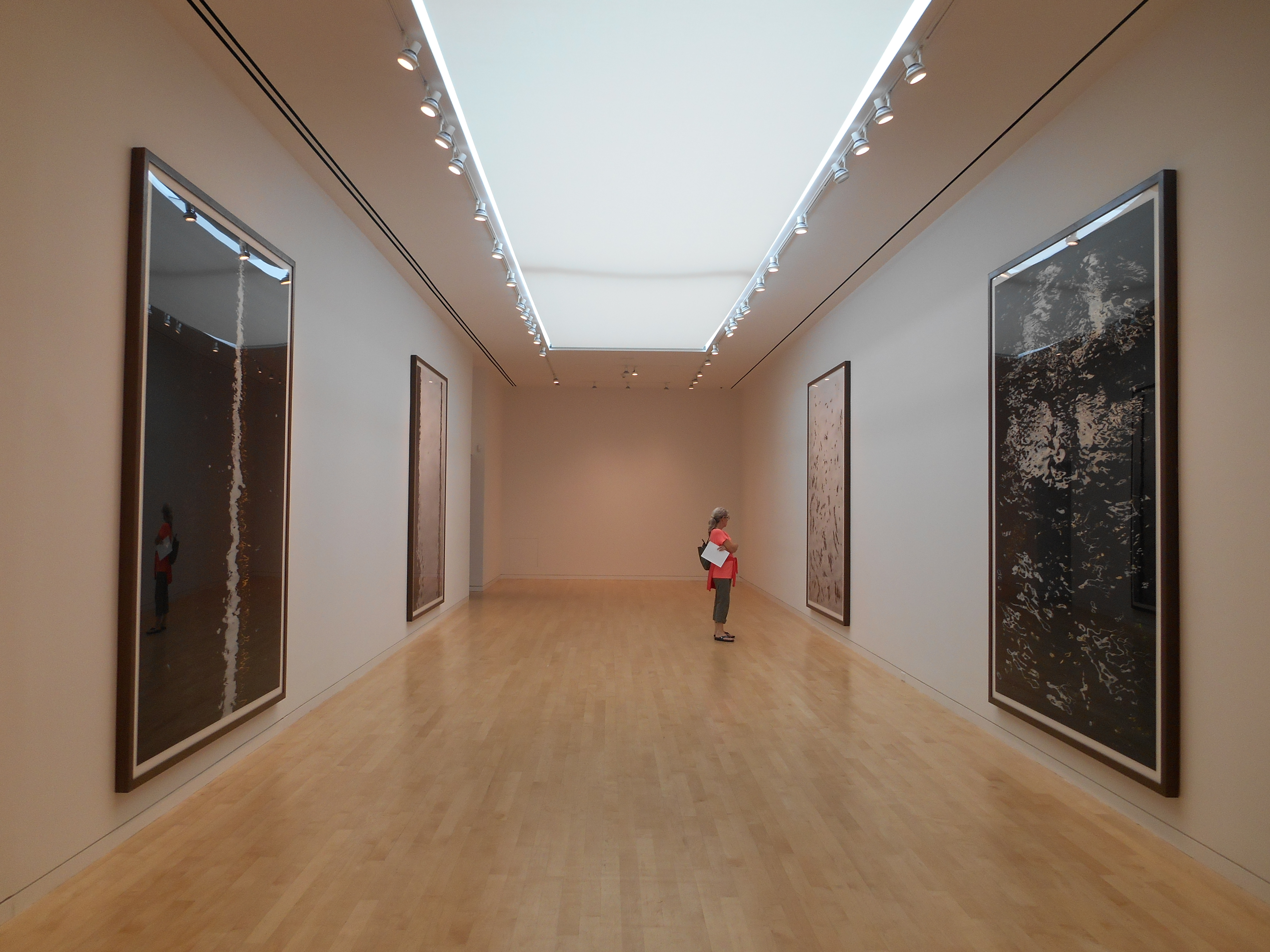
Installation view, Gagosian Gallery, Madison Ave., featuring the work of Andreas Gursky

The uptown gallery on Madison Avenue maintained its commitment to historical exhibitions by showing monumental sculptures by Miró, Calder and Moore, as well as large-scale works by artists such as Richard Serra, Mark di Suvero, Barnett Newman, and Chris Burden. In 1996, the Damien Hirst exhibition No Sense of Absolute Corruption, was the first exhibition in America to show the series of Hirst animals in formaldehyde tanks, a controversial part of the artist's oeuvre.

Andy Warhol was exhibited at both Manhattan galleries, some in collaboration with the Andy Warhol Foundation, including exhibitions of his Rorschach Paintings, Camouflage Paintings, Late Hand-Painted Paintings, Oxidation Paintings and the Diamond Dust Shadow Paintings. Other Andy Warhol works on display had been purchased jointly by Larry Gagosian and Thomas Ammann.

Gagosian opened a location in Beverly Hills designed by architect Richard Meier in 1995. The Beverly Hills gallery mounted exhibitions by Edward Ruscha, Nan Goldin, Frank Gehry, Jeff Koons, and Richard Prince. It also showed modern artists such as Pablo Picasso, Roy Lichtenstein, and Abstract Expressionism group exhibitions.

In September 1999, Gagosian Gallery moved from SoHo to West 24th Street, in New York's Chelsea neighborhood. Architect Richard Gluckman designed the 25,000-square-foot (2,300 m^{2}) gallery in which Richard Serra presented the monumental sculpture, Switch, in November 1999. The large viewing space in Chelsea allowed Gagosian artists, such as Serra and Damien Hirst, to exhibit large-scale works with great flexibility. Gagosian held the Hirst show, Damien Hirst: Models, Methods, Approaches, Assumptions, Results and Findings at the West 24th Street location.

=== 2000s ===
In the spring of 2000, Gagosian became an international gallery with the London opening of a Caruso St John-designed space on Heddon Street, near Piccadilly. The UK gallery inaugurated its exhibitions program with a performance by the Italian artist Vanessa Beecroft, followed by an exhibition of works by Chris Burden. A second London gallery, also designed by Caruso St John, on Britannia Street, opened in May 2004 with a paintings and sculpture show by Cy Twombly. Comparable to the Chelsea (New York) exhibition space in size, this was then the largest commercial art gallery in London. It accommodated large sculptures, video pieces, and installations such as Martin Kippenberger's show, The Magical Misery Tour, Brazil. The Heddon Street location closed in July 2005, and a new storefront space on Davies Street opened simultaneously with an exhibition of Pablo Picasso prints.

To complement the West 24th Street gallery in Manhattan, Richard Gluckman was commissioned to design a second Chelsea location, on West 21st Street; it opened in October 2006. A joint exhibition with the West 24th Street gallery, Cast a Cold Eye: The Late Works of Andy Warhol, launched Gagosian Gallery's third location in New York City. In 2009, the West 21st Street gallery held an exhibition of Pablo Picasso's later works entitled Mosqueteros, curated by Picasso historian John Richardson. The Madison Avenue location introduced a fifth-floor gallery space, set up to focus more on young and upcoming artists. Featuring works by Hayley Tompkins and Anselm Reyle, Old Space New Space was inaugurated in January 2007. The fifth-floor gallery has showcased the works of Steven Parrino, Mark Grotjahn, Isa Genzken, Dan Colen, and Dash Snow, among others. In November 2008, Gagosian expanded its Madison Avenue gallery to include the fourth floor of the building, with an inaugural exhibition of works by Francis Bacon and Alberto Giacometti, Isabel and Other Intimate Strangers, in collaboration with the Giacometti and Bacon Foundations.

Gagosian opened a gallery in Rome in 2007, exhibiting new works by Cy Twombly. The Italian space is a refurbished former bank on Via Francesco Crispi, built in 1921 and redesigned by Rome-based architect Firouz Galdo in collaboration with Caruso St John. The renovation transformed the traditionally classical space into a contemporary gallery while retaining its Roman character. The main hall of the building had a huge bay window; architects remodelled the opposite, formerly perpendicular wall to create an oval space with daylight streaming through the windows.

Strong relationships with Russian collectors and an expanding Russian art scene encouraged Gagosian to host temporary exhibitions in Moscow. As of 2008, buyers from Russia and other republics of the former Soviet Union accounted for half of Gagosian Gallery's total worldwide sales.

=== 2010s ===
In November 2010, Gagosian opened its first Paris gallery, a 350-square-meter space (3,757 square feet) at 4 Rue de Ponthieu. The gallery was designed by architects Jean-Francois Bodin and Caruso St. John. It opened with an exhibition of five new acrylic abstracts and five bronze sculptures by Cy Twombly. The 10 paintings were priced between $4 million and $5 million each, and sold before the gallery's official opening. In July 2012, following the Paris exhibition, Brazil: Reinvention of the Modern, featuring Neo-Concrete artists Sérgio de Camargo, Lygia Clark, Amilcar de Castro, Hélio Oiticica, Lygia Pape, and Mira Schendel, Gagosian held a sculpture exhibition of works by Brazilian artists in Rio de Janeiro as part of the ArtRio fair.

Later in 2010, Gagosian opened its first gallery in Switzerland, a 140-square-metre Art Deco space located off Rue du Rhône in Geneva's business district.

In 2011, Gagosian Gallery expanded its operations into Asia by opening its first permanent gallery in the region, a 5,200-square-foot (480 m^{2}) facility at the Pedder Building in Hong Kong.

In October 2012, Gagosian Gallery opened a new gallery in Le Bourget, a northeastern suburb of Paris. Designed by architect Jean Nouvel, the 17,760-square-foot (1,650 m^{2}) space was the 12th Gagosian location worldwide.

From May 2016 through 2020, Gagosian Gallery operated a space on Howard Street in San Francisco. Over the course of four years, it hosted shows by Richard Prince, Ed Ruscha, Jonas Wood, and Jay DeFeo.

=== 2020s ===
After the 2020 closure of the Howard Street location, Gagosian opened a new gallery in San Francisco in 2021, at the former Marciano Museum. It partnered with the Golden Gate National Recreation Area and the Golden Gate National Parks Conservancy to install two large-scale sculptures by Giuseppe Penone at Fort Mason in 2021.

In 2026, Gagosian hosted its final exhibition at 980 Madison Avenue: a Jasper Johns show.

== Business practices and trends ==
=== Free art exhibitions ===
Some Gagosian Gallery locations feature art and performance exhibitions, free of charge. Very few high-end art galleries are open to the general public. According to Condé Nast Traveler, Gagosian exhibitions "are often as exciting and thoughtfully curated as some of the world's best museums." As of 2022, Gagosian locations that offer free art exhibitions include the Rue de Ponthieu Paris gallery and the two Manhattan galleries in Chelsea.

=== Auction participation ===
Gagosian Gallery aims to maintain the price level of its artists by actively playing a role at art auctions.

- When Christie's established an auction record for Henri Matisse by selling a bronze relief for $48.8 million in 2010, it was Gagosian that bought the work.
- Gagosian Gallery purchased Ed Ruscha's Angry Because It's Plaster, Not Milk (1965) for $3.2 million at Phillips de Pury in 2010, establishing an auction record for that artist.

=== Prepayment ===
Gagosian and a consortium of other art dealers spent years finding buyers to prepay for Jeff Koons' giant Celebration sculptures. These buyers paid $2 million to $8 million, in advance, to own a single one of the artist's car-sized sculptures of balloon dogs and candy-colored hearts. Such arrangements are not without risk: In 2018, Steven Tananbaum brought a case to the New York Supreme Court against Gagosian Gallery and the studio of Jeff Koons over their alleged failure to deliver three of Koons' works for which he had prepaid more than $13 million.

=== Trends ===
Between 2003 and 2008, a number of artists switched from well-known galleries to Gagosian, such as Anselm Reyle from Gavin Brown's Enterprise; John Currin from Andrea Rosen; Mike Kelley from Metro Pictures; Takashi Murakami from Marianne Boesky; and Richard Phillips from Friedrich Petzel. Over the same time period, some artists who had been with Gagosian for many years departed, preferring representation by smaller galleries, including Tom Friedman, Mark di Suvero, Ghada Amer, and the estate of Willem de Kooning, which moved to rival Pace Gallery in 2010.

== Legal issues ==
=== Tax evasion ===
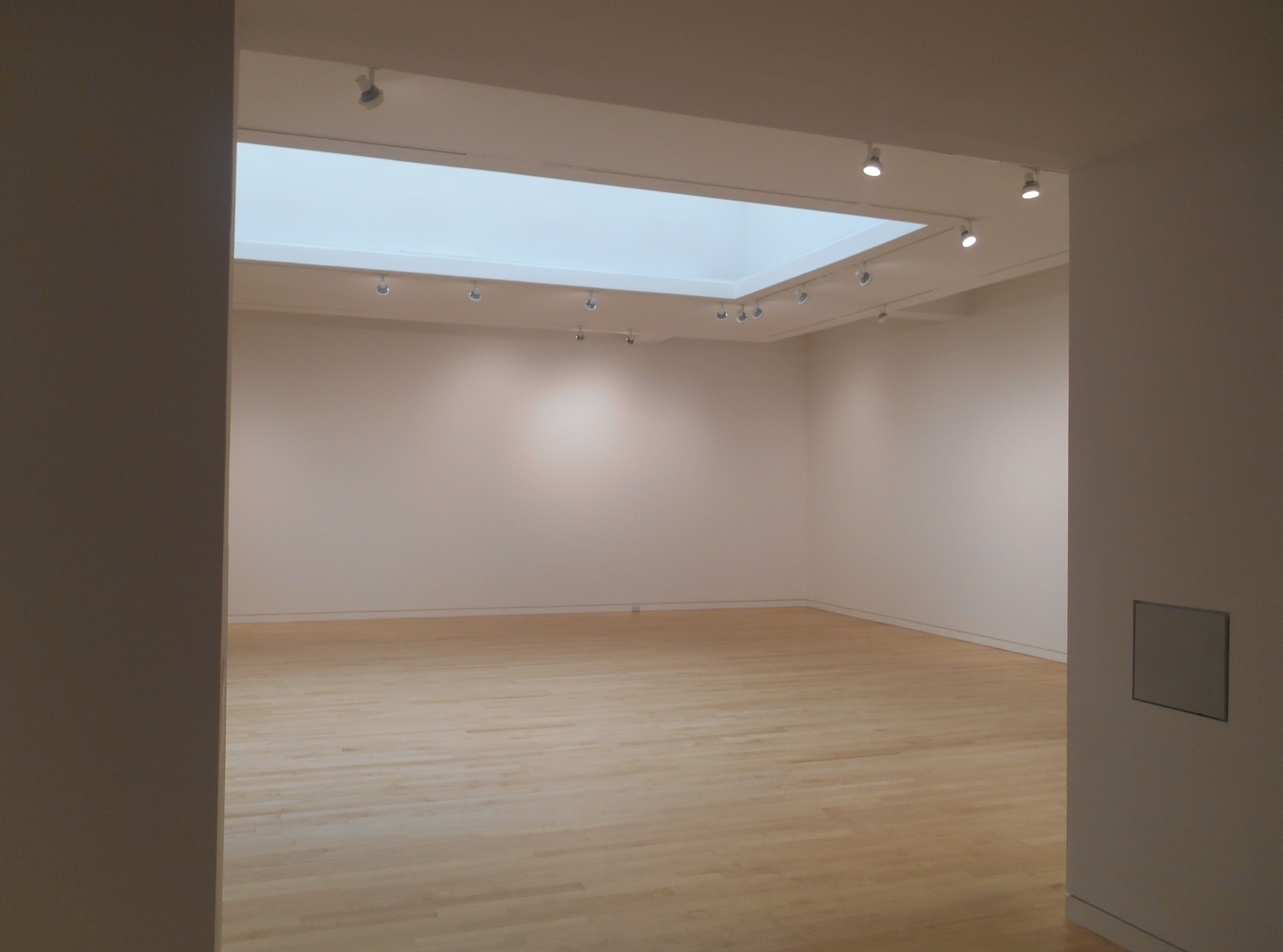
Empty gallery at Gagosian Gallery, Madison Ave.

In 2003, the Internal Revenue Service sued Larry Gagosian and three of his associates, accusing them of evading $26.5 million in taxes, interest, and penalties on a 1990 sale of contemporary art. The IRS charged Gagosian and his partners for deliberately shifting assets out of a company they created, Contemporary Art Holding Corp., to avoid paying taxes.

In 2016, New York Attorney General Eric Schneiderman and the New York State Department of Taxation and Finance investigated Gagosian Gallery and its affiliate Pre-War Art Inc. (in Beverly Hills, California) for failing to pay New York State sales tax on hundreds of art transactions from 2005 to 2015. Gagosian Gallery agreed to a $4.28 million settlement for back taxes, interest, and penalties owed.

=== Copyright infringement ===
When French photographer Patrick Cariou launched a copyright lawsuit against Richard Prince in 2009, Larry Gagosian was named as a co-defendant, as he had displayed the disputed series of Prince paintings in a gallery exhibit titled Canal Zone.

=== Contract breaches and other issues ===
In 2009, a deal that Gagosian Gallery had struck to buy $3 million in gold bricks for the work One Ton, One Kilo by the artist Chris Burden was frozen after disclosure that the gold bricks had been acquired from a company owned by financier Allen Stanford. In March 2009, the U.S. Securities and Exchange Commission had begun investigating Stanford for defrauding investors. Stanford was found guilty and sentenced to 110 years in prison for cheating investors out of more than $7 billion over 20 years, one of the largest Ponzi schemes in US history.

In March 2011, British collector Robert Wylde sued the Gagosian Gallery for selling him a $2.5 million Mark Tansey painting, The Innocent Eye Test (1981), which had already been promised to the Metropolitan Museum of Art by the painting's owner, Jan Cowles. The case was settled for $4.4 million later that year.

In 2012, Gagosian Gallery was brought before the United States District Court for the Southern District of New York in a lawsuit by Jan Cowles, who claimed that the gallery sold a painting, Girl in Mirror (1964) by Roy Lichtenstein, from her collection in 2008 or 2009 without her consent. Cowles and Gagosian agreed to settle the lawsuit in March 2013.

== See also ==
- Antwaun Sargent, a Gagosian Gallery director
