= Carlyle Hotel =

Hotel in Manhattan, New York

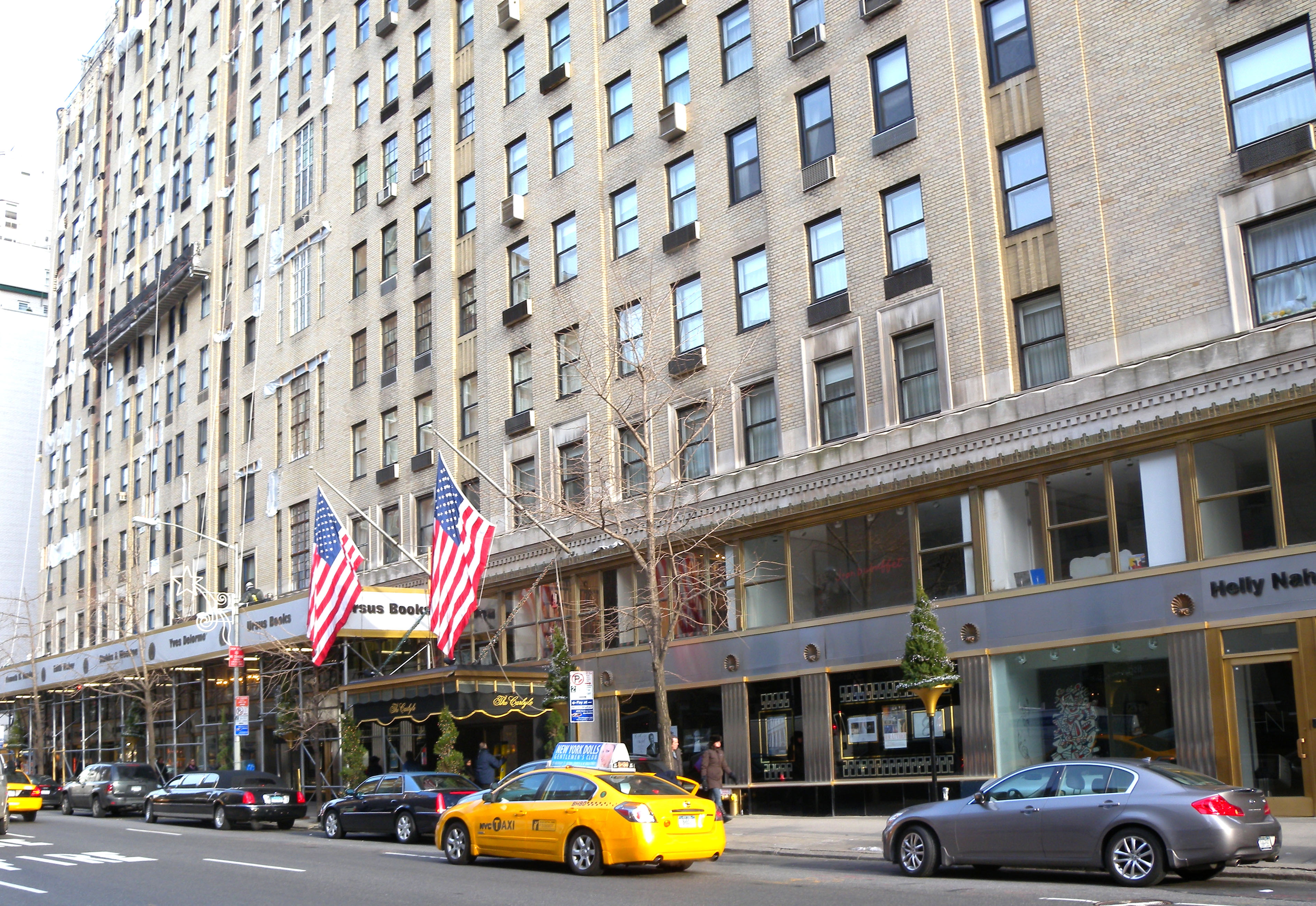
- The hotel's Madison Avenue facade in 2009
- Interactive map of the Carlyle Hotel area

General information
- Location: 35 East 76th Street; Manhattan, New York, U.S.
- Coordinates: 40°46′28″N 73°57′47″W
- Opened: 1930
- Owner: Rosewood Hotels & Resorts (hotel rooms), co-op owners (apartments)

Height
- Height: 426 ft (130 m)

Technical details
- Floor count: 40

Design and construction
- Architects: Sylvan Bien and Harry M. Prince; Dorothy Draper (interiors)

Other information
- Number of rooms: 190 (+ 60 privately owned residences)
- Number of restaurants: Café Carlyle; Bemelmans Bar; Carlyle Restaurant

Website
- thecarlyle.com

The Carlyle Hotel is a luxury apartment hotel on the Upper East Side of Manhattan in New York City. Opened in 1930, the Art Deco hotel was designed by Sylvan Bien and Harry M. Prince, with interiors by Dorothy Draper. It was named after the Scottish author Thomas Carlyle. The Carlyle has approximately 190 hotel rooms and suites, in addition to 60 cooperative residences.

The Carlyle was built by Moses Ginsberg, the maternal grandfather of the novelist Rona Jaffe, starting in 1928. Within two years of the hotel's opening, Ginsberg had lost the hotel to foreclosure, and the Lyleson Corporation took over operation. Robert W. Dowling took over the hotel in 1944 and added entertainment venues, including Bemelmans Bar in 1947 and the Cafe Carlyle in 1955. The partnership of Jerome L. Greene, Norman L. Peck, and Peter Jay Sharp bought the Carlyle in 1967 and converted it into a housing cooperative two years later. Rosewood Hotels & Resorts has owned the hotel since 2001. It is branded as "The Carlyle, a Rosewood Hotel".

The Carlyle is 426 feet (130 m) tall and consists of a 40-story tower to the south and a 14-story apartment building to the north. Draper designed the original main lobby, which connects with an elevator lobby. The lower stories also include a spa and stores, as well as dining areas like the Cafe Carlyle, Bemelmans Bar, and a restaurant named Dowling's. The hotel rooms and suites on the Carlyle Hotel's upper stories are designed in a variety of styles, with multiple layouts. Some of the apartments on the upper stories are leased to residents on a long-term basis, while others are owned by residents. The hotel's Cafe Carlyle has featured jazz performers including George Feyer and Bobby Short, while the Bemelmans Bar's performers have included Barbara Carroll. Over the years, the Carlyle Hotel has been frequented by celebrities, politicians, and royalty. The Carlyle has received much commentary on its culture, architecture, and hotel rooms, and it has frequently ranked among New York City's best hotels.

== Site ==
The Carlyle Hotel is on the east side of Madison Avenue, between 76th and 77th streets, on the Upper East Side of Manhattan in New York City. The building covers two rectangular land lots. The southern land lot measures 101 by 185 feet (31 by 56 m), with an area of 18,800 square feet (1,750 m^{2}), while the northern land lot covers 13,702 square feet (1,273.0 m^{2}), with dimensions of about 103 by 133 feet (31 by 41 m). The site originally had a frontage of 120 feet (37 m) on 76th Street, 204 feet (62 m) on Madison Avenue, and 133 feet (41 m) on 77th Street. The intersection of 76th Street and Madison Avenue is co-named Bobby Short Way in honor of the pianist who frequently performed at the hotel. Across Madison Avenue to the west are the Clarence Whitman Mansion and 980 Madison Avenue, while to the northwest is the Mark Hotel.

Prior to the construction of the hotel, the site had included two apartment buildings: the ten-story Carrollton and another eight-story apartment building. The Carrollton had been built in 1888 and was one of the city's first apartment buildings with a steel superstructure. In the early 20th century, the real estate developer John Larkin owned the site. When construction of the Carlyle began in mid-1929, the site had included seven houses; three additional houses on 77th Street were acquired later that year.

== History ==
During the early 19th century, apartment developments in the city were generally associated with the working class. By the late 19th century, apartment hotels were becoming desirable among the middle and upper classes. Apartment hotels in New York City became more popular after World War I, particularly among wealthy people. As the economy boomed and skyscrapers rose, owning a townhouse in New York City began to fall out of fashion.

=== Development ===
The Carlyle was built by Moses Ginsberg, a banker and real-estate developer who was the maternal grandfather of the novelist Rona Jaffe. In April 1928, Ginsberg bought a 102-by-120-square-foot (9.5 by 11.1 m^{2}) site on the northeast corner of Madison Avenue and 76th Street from the Mayer family, with plans to erect a skyscraper there. Ginsberg acquired further land in February 1929, giving him control of the entire eastern side of Madison Avenue between 76th and 77th streets. The same month, the architect Sylvan Bien filed plans for a 36-story apartment hotel on the site, to be built by the Calvin Morris Corporation. By then, multiple apartment hotels were being built along Madison Avenue on the Upper East Side. Ginsberg acquired two additional houses at 56 and 58 East 77th Street that March, with plans to construct a service entrance for the hotel on these sites.

In July 1929, Ginsberg began clearing the site. At the time, the southern half of the site on 76th Street was to contain the 36-story hotel, while the northern half on 77th Street was to include a 14-story apartment building. Ginsberg rounded out his holdings on 77th Street that November, buying the houses at 54, 60, and 62 East 77th Street. At that time, Sylvan Bien and Joseph Prince announced that a 14-story apartment house with stores would be constructed at the southeast corner of Madison Avenue and 77th Street, on a site measuring 102 by 132 feet (31 by 40 m). A new law limited the heights of apartment buildings in the area, although Ginsberg's structure was exempt, ensuring it would be taller than all of the other apartment houses in the neighborhood.

Work on the building's steel frame began in January 1930. At the time, several other luxury apartment hotels were simultaneously being developed on the Upper East Side including 740 Park Avenue, 960 Fifth Avenue, and The Pierre hotel. Moses's son Calmon Ginsberg, who supervised the hotel's construction, visited 740 Park Avenue and 960 Fifth Avenue to determine what changes needed to be made to the Carlyle. After observing these two buildings, Calmon ultimately only modified the Carlyle's bathroom pipes.

=== Opening and Great Depression ===
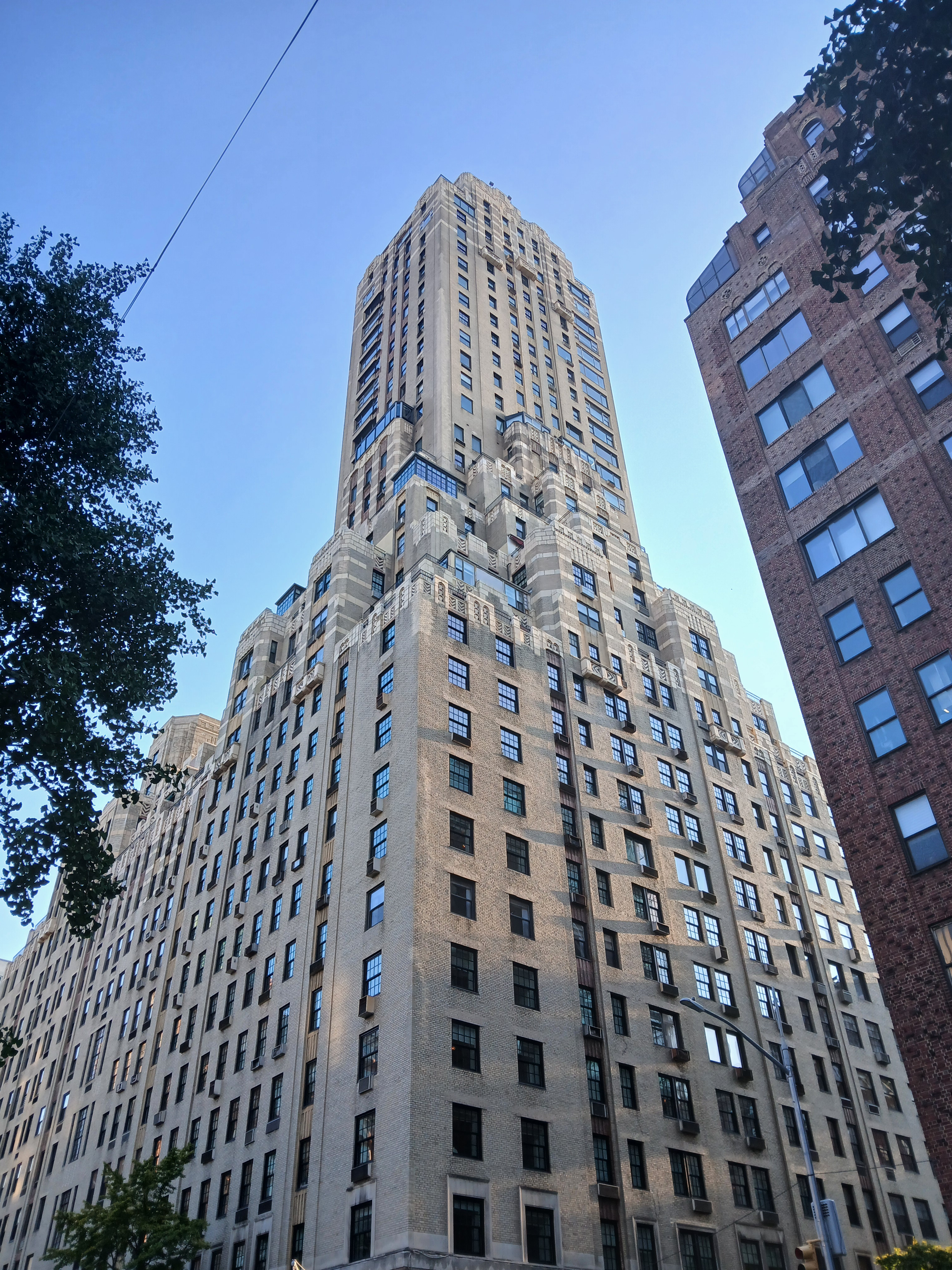
The hotel tower seen from 76th Street and Madison Avenue

The hotel opened on November 3, 1930, with apartments that originally cost up to $1 million a year. Originally, occupants could rent apartments on a monthly or annual basis, or they could pay for rooms by the night. At the suggestion of Ginsberg's daughter Diana, the hotel was named after the Scottish author Thomas Carlyle. Initially, the hotel was far removed from both the Midtown Manhattan shopping district and the Theater District, and the surrounding neighborhood was rundown. Contrary to other major buildings that had spurred waves of development in their respective areas, the opening of the Carlyle did not spur any large-scale development on Madison Avenue. It was not until later that structures such as the Parke-Bernet galleries at 980 Madison Avenue, as well as the Whitney Museum at 945 Madison Avenue, were developed.

The Carlyle Hotel was one of several large structures in New York City to be completed just after the onset of the Great Depression, along with London Terrace, The Majestic, Hampshire House, and 330 West 42nd Street. The Calvin Morris Corporation filed $444,870 worth of mechanics' liens against Ginsberg in January 1931, shortly after the Carlyle had opened. A floral shop opened on the hotel's ground floor that year. The Carlyle also had a barbershop operated by Joe Miceli on the ground floor, which opened shortly after the hotel's completion and operated nearly continuously for half a century. The hotel quickly gained tenants in spite of the Depression. The Carlyle was placed for sale at a foreclosure auction in December 1931, and it was again listed for sale in February 1932. Subsequently, the Carlyle went into receivership.

The hotel was sold in May 1932 to Samuel A. Telsey, who had bid $2.655 million on the structure. The Lyleson Corporation, a subsidiary of the Consolidated-Dearborn Corporation, took control the same year. The new owners kept the original management, which was able to dramatically improve the property's financial situation through maintaining high occupancy and rates favorable to the hotel's costs. The hotel's reputation at the time was "staid rather than ritzy", and its clientele were largely upper-class and low-profile, including business executives and elderly women. For the most part, the hotel did not attract celebrity residents. The storefront, basement, and mezzanine of the apartment-house section on 77th Street was leased to a drugstore in 1935. During the late 1930s, the Carlyle's restaurant and bar area were expanded, and air-conditioning was installed on the first floor. Muzak music was played at the bar, which served drinks and light snacks.

=== Dowling and Rockefeller ownership ===
The post–World War II development boom allowed the hotel to take on new high-society prominence. The City Investing Company, led by the businessman Robert Whittle Dowling, purchased the Carlyle in June 1944; the purchase was financed by a $1.3 million loan. Dowling also bought three nearby buildings to protect the views from the Carlyle. After obtaining the Carlyle, Dowling transformed from a "respectable" address to a "downright fashionable" one frequented by elegant Europeans, operating it similarly to a social club in that prospective guests were required to provide social references. at one point, the hotel's staff checked whether potential guests were on the Social Register before allowing them to book rooms there. To preserve the hotel's exposure to sunlight, Dowling built a low-rise building immediately to the west at 980 Madison Avenue. Robert Huyot was appointed as the hotel's president and general manager later the same year. When a federal rent regulation restriction expired in 1947, Huyot decided to raise rents for the hotel's guests by as much as 15%. The same year, the hotel's bar became the Bemelmans Bar.

In the years after the war, various luxury stores and restaurants had opened around the Carlyle, and there were also several art galleries nearby. A real-estate brokerage also opened on the hotel's ground floor in 1952. The Rockefeller family's Hills Realty Company bought the Carlyle Hotel and Carlyle Apartments in May 1953, leasing the hotel's operation back to Dowling for 21 years. At the time, the hotel and apartment building had a combined 800 rooms, and workers were adding stainless-steel storefronts at ground level. The hotel's operators also spent $125,000 to convert part of the space into a supper club named the Café Carlyle, with murals by Marcel Vertès. The Café Carlyle opened in November 1955. An art gallery, the World House Galleries, opened within the Carlyle Hotel in early 1957. The gallery space, designed by Frederick Kiesler, occupied two stories of the hotel and included various niches, cantilevered stairs, and curving walls.

By the early 1960s, the Carlyle had become a luxury hotel, and its staff provided personalized service for visitors. Janusz Ilinski was appointed as the hotel's chairman and CEO in 1961 but died three months after his appointment. The City Investing Company acquired a one-third ownership stake in the hotel building in 1965 from the Hills Realty Company. In exchange, City Investing transferred ownership of 980 Madison Avenue, as well as an industrial park in Edison, New Jersey, to the Rockefeller family. In addition, a flower shop opened on the hotel's ground floor the same year and the hotel's managers replaced the existing windows with movable windows. The Café Carlyle also underwent a minor refurbishment; the club was repainted, and its furniture was re-upholstered. By the late 1960s, musicians frequented the hotel.

=== Greene, Peck, and Sharp ownership ===
==== 1960s and 1970s ====
In 1967, the hotel was purchased by a partnership of Jerome L. Greene, Norman L. Peck, and Peter Jay Sharp at an estimated cost of $16 million. At the time, the apartments were being rented out for between $10,000 and $65,000 a year. Sharp subsequently appointed Harold P. Bock as the Carlyle Hotel's general manager. During the late 1960s, parts of the ground and second stories were leased the same year to a stockbroker, who renovated the space into an office, and the Albrizzi furniture showroom and the Cordoba leather boutique opened on the ground floor. In addition, the Van der Straeten Gallery of Contemporary Artists opened an art gallery at the hotel. In general, many of the Carlyle's visitors came from the art industry due to the presence of art galleries in the neighborhood. The hotel became known as "Peter's place" because of how much attention Sharp paid to the hotel's management.

Sharp initially denied that he wanted to convert the Carlyle into a housing cooperative. However, in May 1968, he submitted a prospectus to the Attorney General of New York, informing the state government of his plans to convert the building into a cooperative. The sponsors of the co-op conversion plan also established a corporation to take over the Carlyle's operation. The Carlyle's cooperative conversion took effect in 1969. About 85 apartments were retained for short-term guests. Co-op shareholders, who paid monthly service and maintenance fees, received service from hotel staff and were allowed to lease out their own apartments. The hotel's upper stories mostly were occupied by permanent residents, though some of the upper-story rooms were retained for transient visitors. The Carlyle continued to attract short-term guests after its conversion.

Bock retired as the hotel's manager in 1971, and George Markham became the hotel's manager and president in 1975, operating it for 14 years. The lobby was damaged in the 1970s when a water pipe burst; to prevent visitors from seeing the damage to the lobby, the hotel's managers covered up the damaged lobby with an Arabian tent. In addition, Bernard and S. Dean Levy opened an art gallery on the Carlyle Hotel's second floor in 1976, operating the gallery there for ten years. The hotel's operators also expanded the six maids' bedrooms. By the late 1970s, visitors frequented the Carlyle for the musical performances at the Bemelmans Bar and the Café Carlyle. A Victorian-style cafe between the hotel's restaurant and the Bemelmans Bar operated in the late 20th century, serving afternoon tea. The New York City Landmarks Preservation Commission proposed designating the hotel as part of the Upper East Side Historic District in 1979. Despite Sharp's opposition to the district's designation, the district was established in 1981.

==== 1980s and 1990s ====
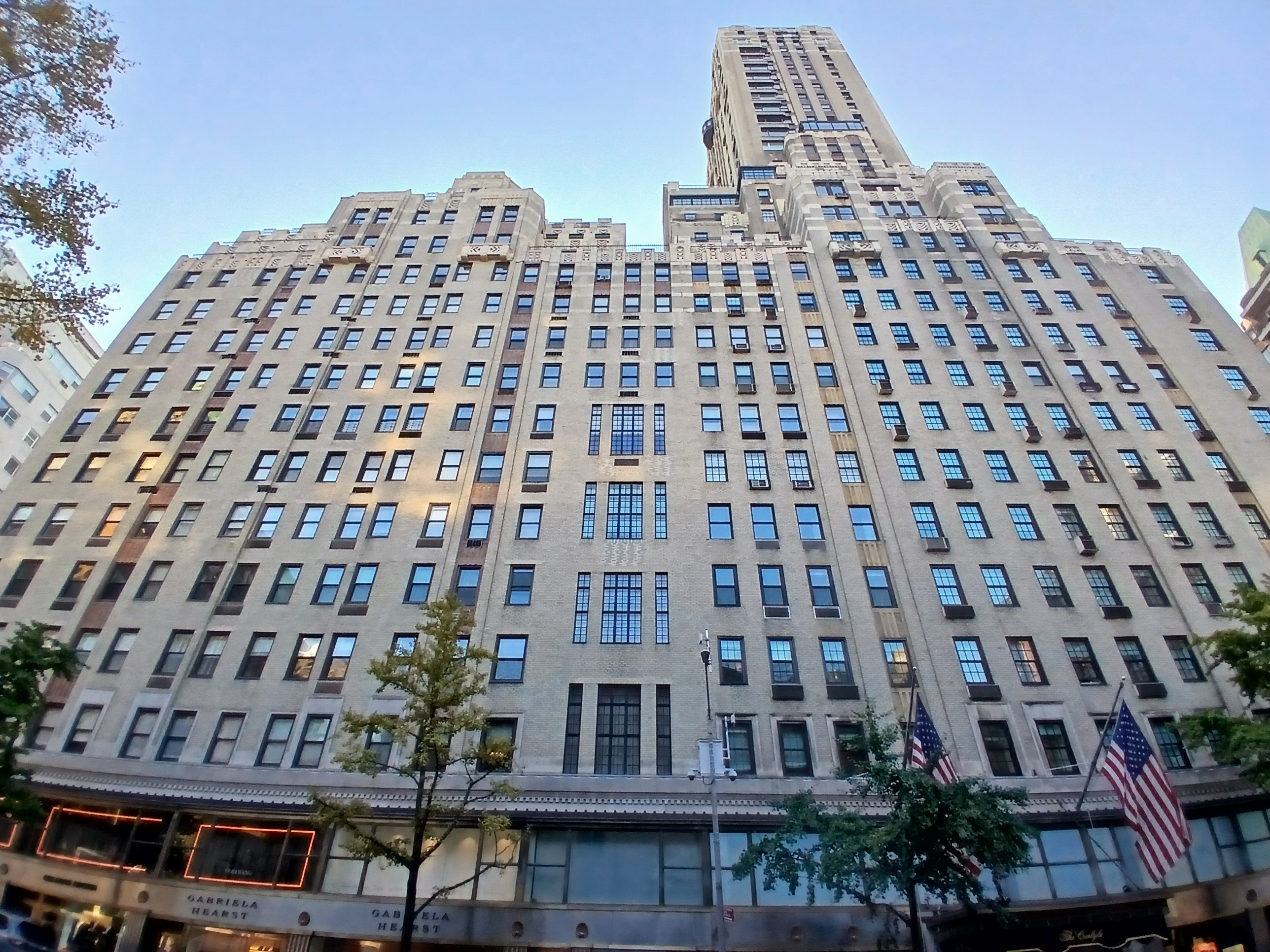
The exterior of the hotel as seen from Madison Avenue

By the 1980s, about 80% of the Carlyle's clientele consisted of repeat guests. It had become increasingly difficult for other guests to reserve a room there, as the hotel was frequently fully occupied. The Carlyle did not offer any discounts and did not have a sales or marketing development; it still employed elevator operators even though the elevators were automatic. Many of the hotel's staff had worked there for several decades and had gotten to know frequent guests; one of the hotel's bellhops had been hired in 1949 and ultimately worked there for 57 years. The Carlyle's staff members outnumbered guests nearly two to one. The staff frequently fulfilled special requests from guests, leading Markham to say that "everybody is a favored guest". In one case, a staff member brought a grand piano into Imelda Marcos's suite a few hours before pianist Van Cliburn was to perform for her, while another staff member lent Laurence Olivier his own bowtie for a dinner. Neighborhood residents sometimes stayed at the Carlyle if they were displaced from their homes. Sharp was exacting when it came to the hotel's cleanliness, to the extent that he had housekeepers dust the tops of the doors before each guest arrived.

The Carlyle's management began remodeling the hotel in 1983, forcing the hotel's barbershop to close temporarily. Workers re-gilded the hotel's roof the next year, and the art dealer Michael B. Weisbrod opened a store at the Carlyle in 1986. By the late 1980s, the hotel recorded a net operating profit of $4.4 million per year, and the retail space earned about $1.6 million annually. Despite increasing competition in New York City's luxury hotel market, Markham expressed optimism that the hotel's most loyal customers would continue to patronize the Carlyle. At the time, there were 180 rooms for short-term visitors. To attract guests, the hotel's operators added tape decks and videocassette recorders in each of the rooms. Lorenzo Mongiardino redesigned the hotel's gallery in 1989, hiring Gaser Tabakoglu to convert it into a tea gallery inspired by Istanbul's Topkapı Palace. Dan Camp succeeded Markham as the hotel's manager that year.

The Carlyle had a rare book store by the early 1990s, and Vera Wang opened a bridal shop at the hotel in 1990. The hotel's operators also renovated the Bemelmans Bar, converted some executive offices into a 2,200-square-foot (200 m^{2}) fitness center, and hired Mark Hampton and Nelson Ferlita to redesign the rooms at a cost of about $100,000 per room. At the time, the Carlyle had 74 co-op apartments and 183 hotel rooms. The Carlyle's co-owner Peter Jay Sharp died in 1992 and his partner Jerome Greene acquired majority ownership of the Carlyle. To attract guests, the Carlyle's operators offered room upgrades to selected guests with American Express credit cards. Some apartment owners at the Carlyle also rented out their apartments to hotel guests. In addition, Judith Leiber opened a handbag boutique at the hotel in 1995.

In early 1999, Jerome Greene and Mary Sharp Cronson placed the hotel for sale, hiring Eastdil Realty to market the hotel rooms. After Greene died that May, Norman Peck took over his partner's stake in the hotel and sought to sell it, privately contacting several potential buyers. Despite Peck's attempts to avoid publicizing the hotel's potential sale, more than 50 potential buyers ultimately submitted bids for the hotel. Peck encountered difficulties in selling the hotel, in part because the building was structured as a housing cooperative; as such, any buyer had to acquire shares in the cooperative rather than purchasing the building outright. By October 2000, Peck was negotiating with three potential buyers, including the Indian conglomerate Tata Group.

=== Rosewood ownership ===
==== 2000s and 2010s ====
Maritz, Wolff & Company, which owned a 50% stake in Rosewood Hotels & Resorts, agreed in January 2001 to buy the Carlyle for $130 million. Maritz Wolff paid about $720,000 per room, making it one of the highest-priced hotel sales in world history. The buyers paid only about $50 million up front, and they received a loan for the remaining amount from co-op owners at the Carlyle. As part of the sale, the new owners were required to retain the hotel's name and character. Maritz Wolff owned 52% of the shares in the co-op, while residents owned the remaining shares. The hotel's president Dan Camp resigned shortly after the sale. Thierry Despont was hired to redesign the hotel's corridors and the lobby. Maritz Wolff also began renovating the hotel tower's facade and renovated the Bemelmans Bar again. After the September 11 attacks later in 2001, the hotel's business declined due to a downturn in New York City's tourism industry. The Bemelmans Bar reopened in 2002, and the hotel's Carlyle Restaurant was also renovated that year. Rosewood spent $2 million advertising the Carlyle and its other luxury hotels to attract guests after the September 11 attacks.

The hotel continued to have many long-term residents, many of whom were old and wealthy. Rosewood gradually bought out some of the Carlyle's co-op apartments as their owners moved out. To attract younger guests, Rosewood added a business center to the hotel in 2004. A jewelry store operated by K. C. Thompson opened at the Carlyle in 2005, and the hotel began lending digital cameras to its guests the next year as part of a pilot program. The hotel's manager James McBride also contemplated moving the Café Carlyle to the basement but ultimately decided to renovate it. The Café Carlyle was closed during July 2007 for renovations, reopening that September. Workers restored the club's murals and added new furniture, and the interior designer Scott Salvator removed the dropped ceiling and installed a modern sound and a lighting system. The Sense spa opened on the hotel's third story in October 2008. The spa, occupying two levels above an adjacent parking garage, was decorated by Mark Zeff. Occupancy declined after the 2008 financial crisis.

The Hong Kong businessman Cheng Yu-tung bought the Carlyle's hotel rooms and four other Rosewood hotels in 2011 for a combined $570 million. At the time, the hotel had 68 private residences, and some long-term tenants rented rooms for long periods. In the 2010s, the Carlyle Hotel continued to attract high-society figures and well-off youth, and there were still frequent music performances at the hotel. By then, one-fifth of the Carlyle's revenue came from selling the apartments to long-term residents; the apartments' service charges amounted to thousands of dollars per month, while the hotel rooms rented for between $700 and $15,000 a night. The hotel's 420 employees continued to clean and furnish the guestrooms daily, including one employee who was responsible for maintaining the hotel's decorations and artwork.

The fashion brand Perrin Paris opened a boutique at the hotel in 2012, and the hotel temporarily sheltered displaced residents after Hurricane Sandy later that year. Cheng Yu-tung's daughter Sonia Cheng also planned to renovate the Carlyle, hiring Alexandra Champalimaud to redesign some of the spaces. A pop-up bookstore temporarily operated at the hotel in 2015, and the same year, Rosewood began formally renting out some of the Carlyle's suites. In addition, a Gabriela Hearst fashion boutique opened within the Carlyle Hotel in 2018. Rosewood began renovating the Carlyle's guestrooms in 2019. Tony Chi redesigned 155 of the hotel rooms and suites, while multiple designers renovated the other units.

==== 2020s to present ====
Due to the COVID-19 pandemic in New York City, the Café Carlyle was temporarily closed in March 2020, and all performances there were canceled. The Bemelmans Bar and Carlyle Restaurant were also shuttered, and the Carlyle stopped renting out hotel rooms and dismissed 250 of its staff members. The hotel partially reopened that November after some COVID-19 pandemic restrictions were lifted. The bar reopened in May 2021, while the Carlyle Restaurant was replaced that October with a restaurant named Dowling's. The same year, the renovation of the hotel's guestrooms was completed. A store and spa operated by the Valmont skincare company opened in December 2021, and the Café Carlyle reopened in March 2022, having been closed for two years.

== Architecture ==
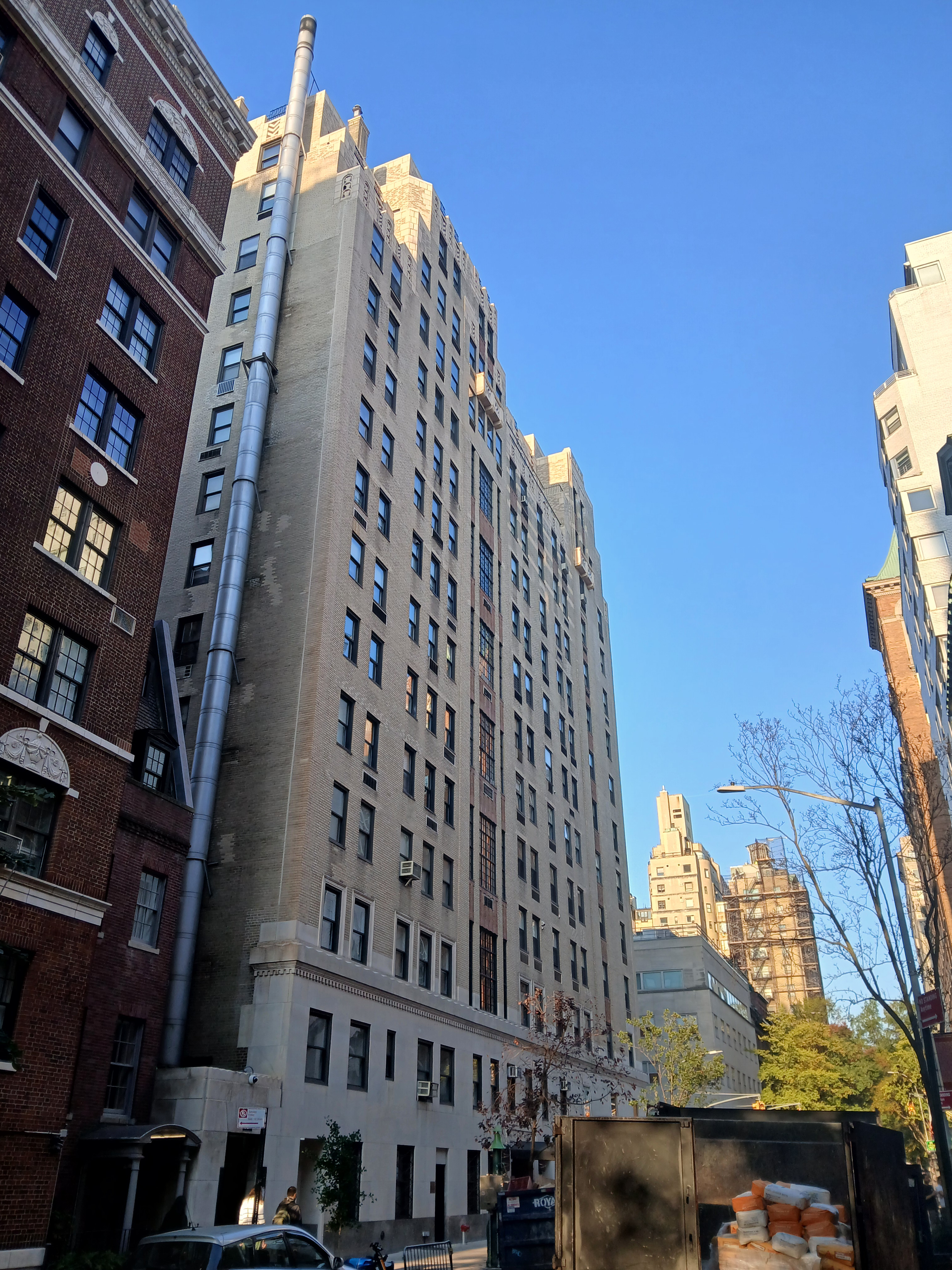
The Carlyle's apartment wing as seen from 77th Street

The Carlyle was designed in the Art Deco style by architects Sylvan Bien and Harry M. Prince. The hotel "was to be a masterpiece in the modern idiom, in which shops and restaurants on the lower floors would give residents the convenience and comforts of a community skyscraper". The design of the hotel inspired that of the Chatham condominium building on 65th Street and Third Avenue, which was designed by Robert A. M. Stern. The hotel has a floor area of about 800,000 square feet (74,000 m^{2}).

The building is 426 feet (130 m) tall, and there are setbacks on the upper stories. As built, the Carlyle consists of a 40-story tower along 76th Street to the south and a 14-story apartment building along 77th Street to the north, the latter of which is known as the Carlyle House. There were separate entrances for each section, and a public arcade connected the two structures. By the 21st century, permanent residents and short-term guests shared the entrances. The first three stories of both sections were clad with limestone and granite, while the stories above were clad in terracotta and gray brick. All of the ground-floor storefronts share a facade design. The architectural details of the Carlyle's tower stories were influenced by those of the Westminster Cathedral's tower. The tower also functions as a chimney for the fireplaces in the hotel rooms and apartments.

=== Lobby and amenity spaces ===
The original main lobby was designed by Dorothy Draper. The entrance hall initially had white marble columns, in addition to mirrors on the walls. The main lobby was decorated in green and had a grayscale marble floor, yellow-leather furniture and a green frieze near the tops of its walls. When the hotel opened, the New York Herald Tribune described the original interiors as not having any defined style, though the newspaper cited the original design as being most stylistically similar to the Empire style. In the late 20th century, one source characterized the lobby as a small space with minimal decorations and furniture, while another source described it as akin to an apartment-building lobby. The Globe and Mail said the small size of the reception area "affords no opportunity for milling crowds". Following a renovation by Despont in the 2000s, walnut-and-ochre furniture was added to the lobby, and the marble floors were restored.

Next to the lobby was an elevator lobby with a black-and-white marble fireplace mantel, as well as white walls with pilasters. The elevator lobby was illuminated by urns on pedestals. Past the elevator lobby are a series of small lounges. The hotel's main offices were on the same level, past the hotel's tea gallery.

The first floor contains a store operated by the Valmont Group. On the third floor is the Sense spa, which is designed in the Art Deco style. A staircase with a barrel-vaulted ceiling leads down from the main spa to a cluster of five private treatment rooms. The third floor also includes the Valmont spa, which has decorations by artists such as Mark Tobey and Sol LeWitt. On the same level is the Yves Durif salon. The hotel has a fitness center as well. Originally, there was a playground and a gymnasium within the building, as well as a roof garden between the Carlyle and the neighboring structure at 50 East 77th Street.

=== Entertainment and dining venues ===
The hotel's main dining area was originally known as the Carlyle Restaurant and was decorated in the style of an English manor house. The main dining area originally had yellow wallpaper and a marble fireplace mantel. There was also a room with a fountain next to the main dining area. By the late 20th century, the dining area was divided into three rooms, and a Globe and Mail article described the restaurant as having decorations such as sconces and tapestries. At the time, it had both a relatively cheap breakfast buffet and a pricier à la carte menu; The New York Times characterized the cuisine as continental, while The Wall Street Journal said the restaurant's menu changed every season. The restaurant was called the Dumonet at the Carlyle, after its chef Jean-Louis Dumonet, during the 2000s. In 2021, the space was renovated and converted to a fine dining restaurant named Dowling's. The restaurant space is decorated in a grayscale color palette with 1940s–era motifs, artwork, and photos, in addition to private dining booths with geometric decorations. Dowling's cuisine consists of mid-20th-century dishes such as salt-crusted branzino, foie gras terrine, lobster bisque, and steak Diane.

Above the dining room was a Victorian–style suite on a mezzanine level, with sitting, drawing, and dining rooms. Originally, the Victorian suite's dining room had a blue painted ceiling and was furnished with round glass lamps, gold-framed portraits, red window curtains, and rose-wood chairs. The other two rooms had flowered wallpaper, and all three rooms displayed 19th-century objets d'art. The suite later became known as the Trianon Suite, which consists of a foyer and three suites. In the mid-20th century, the hotel also had a restaurant called the Regency Room, which served Continental American cuisine.

The Café Carlyle, a supper club on the ground level, occupies a windowless space with soft lighting. The space can fit 90 people. It is decorated with murals by Marcel Vertès, which depict semi-nude women doing various activities, accompanied by motifs of musicians in whimsical outfits. In its early years, the club hosted two to three shows each night, although this had been reduced to one nightly show by the 2020s. A New York Times article from the 1970s described the cafe as serving "simple fare" (ranging from sandwiches to sirloin steak) during the daytime, with performances at night, while a 1993 Washington Post article characterized the club as serving French continental fare. The club serves prix fixe dinners prior to performances, which typically last 90 minutes.

Bemelmans Bar, located next to Café Carlyle, is designed in an Art Deco style with a gold-leaf ceiling. It is decorated with murals depicting Madeline in Central Park, which were painted by the bar's namesake Ludwig Bemelmans. It took Bemelmans 18 months to paint the murals, which are his only artworks on public display. The bar has a less formal ambiance compared with the Cafe Carlyle, and it is also typically less expensive. Grub Street described the Bemelmans Bar as attracting a diverse crowd. In the 21st century, the bar sometimes hosts activities for children, and it has nightly piano performances as well. Next to the bar is a tea gallery called the Gallery, which occupies a pair of rooms that are designed to resemble Istanbul's 17th-century Topkapı Palace. The Gallery is decorated with paneling and dark wallpaper.

=== Guestrooms and apartments ===
==== Hotel rooms ====
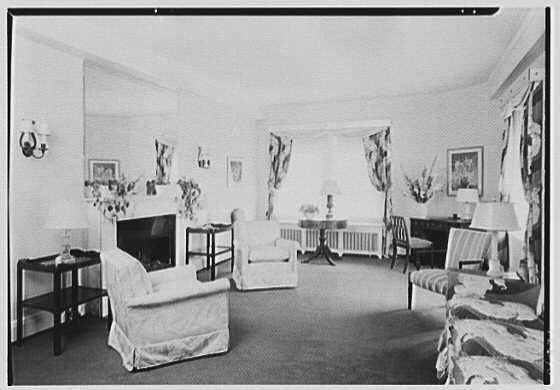
A 1942 photo of a room

The Carlyle Hotel is variously cited as having 189, 190, or 192 hotel rooms. There are about 100 standard rooms, and the remaining units are suites. Originally, Draper decorated the rooms in the Art Deco and Empire styles, and each room had different decorations. The rooms were subsequently redesigned by Mark Hampton. By the 2000s, the rooms were variously decorated in shades of red, yellow, cream, or blue, with prints on the walls. The units had large TVs and monogrammed bathrobes, in addition to custom-made items such as ashtrays and beauty products. As of 2024, the rooms are arranged in various layouts, including suites with one, two, or three bedrooms. The units are decorated in the Art Deco style and have abstract art, armchairs, and ottomans. Each room also has minibars, newspapers, coffee machines, and various coffee table books. The bathrooms of each unit have underfloor heating systems. There are baby grand pianos in more than 20 suites.

The hotel has 34 themed suites. Among the hotel's largest units is the presidential suite, which occupies the entire 26th floor and has a bronze mail chute and an Art Deco–style private elevator. The presidential suite has three bedrooms, a gallery entrance with Art Deco-styled murals, a media room, a dining area, and a living room. Another suite, the two-bedroom Royal Suite on the 22nd floor, has 1,800 square feet (170 m^{2}) and includes a black marble fireplace and 14-foot-high (4.3 m) ceilings. The Empire Suite occupies two stories and has 2,600 square feet (240 m^{2}), with three bedrooms and a private art collection. In the 21st century, the Empire Suite has ranked as one of New York City's most expensive hotel suites, charging $15,000 a night. The suites in the highest stories have living rooms that overlook Central Park to the west. The Tower Premier rooms, designed by Alexandra Champalimaud, each include one bedroom and are decorated with antiques.

==== Apartments ====
The modern-day Carlyle Hotel also includes 60 apartments. Long-term residents either sign three-year leases or buy their apartments outright; because the Carlyle is structured as a co-op, apartment owners have to pay a monthly fee. Originally, the apartments in the northern portion of the hotel had between 7 and 23 rooms, which were elaborately decorated even though they were completed during the Depression. Some of the apartments had double-level living rooms, and there were also duplex apartments with 8 or 9 rooms. In addition, there were terraces next to each apartment on the 14th through 19th stories, and some of the apartments had sun rooms. One of the penthouses had 26 rooms across three floors, while another penthouse had sixteen rooms and eight baths across two floors. In contrast to other apartment hotels in New York City, the Carlyle's apartments have kitchens. The third and fourth floors had 12 small rooms for maids.

In 1963, Benno de Terey and George Hickey III redesigned one of the suites on the 24th and 25th floors as a French-style pied-à-terre. By the late 1960s, the building's apartments mostly had between one and three bedrooms, and some of the units also had sun rooms, terraces, galleries, and maids' bedrooms. On the Carlyle's northern facade is an oriel window where the Kennedy family built a breakfast niche in their apartment, which was located on the 34th and 35th floors. By the 1980s, the 34th floor had been split into two penthouse suites. Over the years, designers such as Mark Hampton, Thierry Despont, and Alexandra Champalimaud have redesigned some of the apartments.

== Notable events and performances ==
=== Entertainment ===
The hotel's Café Carlyle has featured jazz performers throughout the years. George Feyer was the club's first resident performer from 1955 to 1968, interspersing his piano performances with commentary on current events. Feyer was succeeded by Bobby Short, who performed there five days a week and eight months a year; Short gave regular performances until 2004, the year before his death. During Short's time at the Café Carlyle, the club became increasingly known as a jazz club, differentiating itself from the city's many other supper clubs. Although there had been a less formal atmosphere at the Café Carlyle when Short began performing there, by the 1970s it had gained a reputation as the "classiest saloon in town" where reservations were required.

There have been other performers at the Café Carlyle over the years. Some of these performers filled in for Short whenever he was on vacation; for example, Teddi King performed at the club in the 1970s, and George Shearing had brief performances at the hotel in 1979 and 1984. Alan Cumming gave a series of concerts at the Café Carlyle in June 2015; the album of the performance, Alan Cumming Sings Sappy Songs, features a photograph of Cumming shot in the doorway of the cafe. Other performers at the Café Carlyle have included Dixie Carter, the Modern Jazz Quartet, Woody Allen, Eartha Kitt, Isaac Mizrahi, and Rita Wilson. To celebrate the hotel's 75th anniversary, the Café Carlyle held numerous cabaret performances in 2004–2005, and in honor of Bobby Short's 100th birthday, the Café Carlyle hosted jazz performances from various artists in late 2024 and early 2025.

The performers at the Bemelmans Bar over the years have included Dick Wellstood, Marian McPartland, Peter Mintun, Loston Harris, Tony Bennett, Billy Joel, John Mayer, and Mariah Carey. Jazz pianist and vocalist Barbara Carroll performed at the bar for 14 years, and composer and pianist Earl Rose played there for 25 years. Paul McCartney, Cyndi Lauper, and Bono have also performed at the Carlyle Hotel.

=== Other events ===
In the mid-20th century, the hotel hosted events such as an annual exhibition of items made by Mount Sinai Hospital patients and fashion shows. The Council for United Civil Rights Leadership (CUCRL) was organized in a meeting held at the Carlyle. Malcolm X expressed his concerns with having a white man in charge of this new fundraising organization during a November 10, 1963, speech, "Message to the Grass Roots". In addition, the hotel often hosts events relating to the annual Met Gala, and celebrities appearing at the Met Gala often stay there. Women's Wear Daily wrote in 2023 that celebrities visiting the hotel during the Met Gala "create a media moment almost equal to the red carpet of the fashion fundraiser itself".

The hotel has also been used for business negotiations. It is the namesake of the financial conglomerate The Carlyle Group, whose founders had first met at the hotel. Additionally, in 1993, Sumner Redstone and Martin S. Davis met at the hotel to discuss Viacom's acquisition of Paramount Global. Other figures, such as the financiers Lionel Pincus and Robert Rubin and the diplomat Henry Kissinger, have also hosted breakfast meetings at the hotel.

== Notable people ==
Over the years, the Carlyle Hotel has been frequented by celebrities, ranging from Hollywood actors to the nouveau riche to politicians and royalty. Despite its famous clientele, the hotel retained a reputation for discretion, leading to the nickname "Palace of Secrets". Ronald Hector, who worked in the hotel's lobby for four decades, refused to tell anecdotes about the hotel's guests until their deaths. One of the hotel's general managers said in 2000 that the Carlyle "attracts people who lead very high-profile lives but who are desperate to lead low ones". A Crain's New York reporter said in 1988 that the hotel's management had been reluctant to talk to reporters because a New York magazine article from 1983 had been indiscreet about the hotel's clientele. Despite the staff's reluctance to divulge famous guests' identities, paparazzi have sometimes received information about celebrity guests anyway.

=== Politicians ===
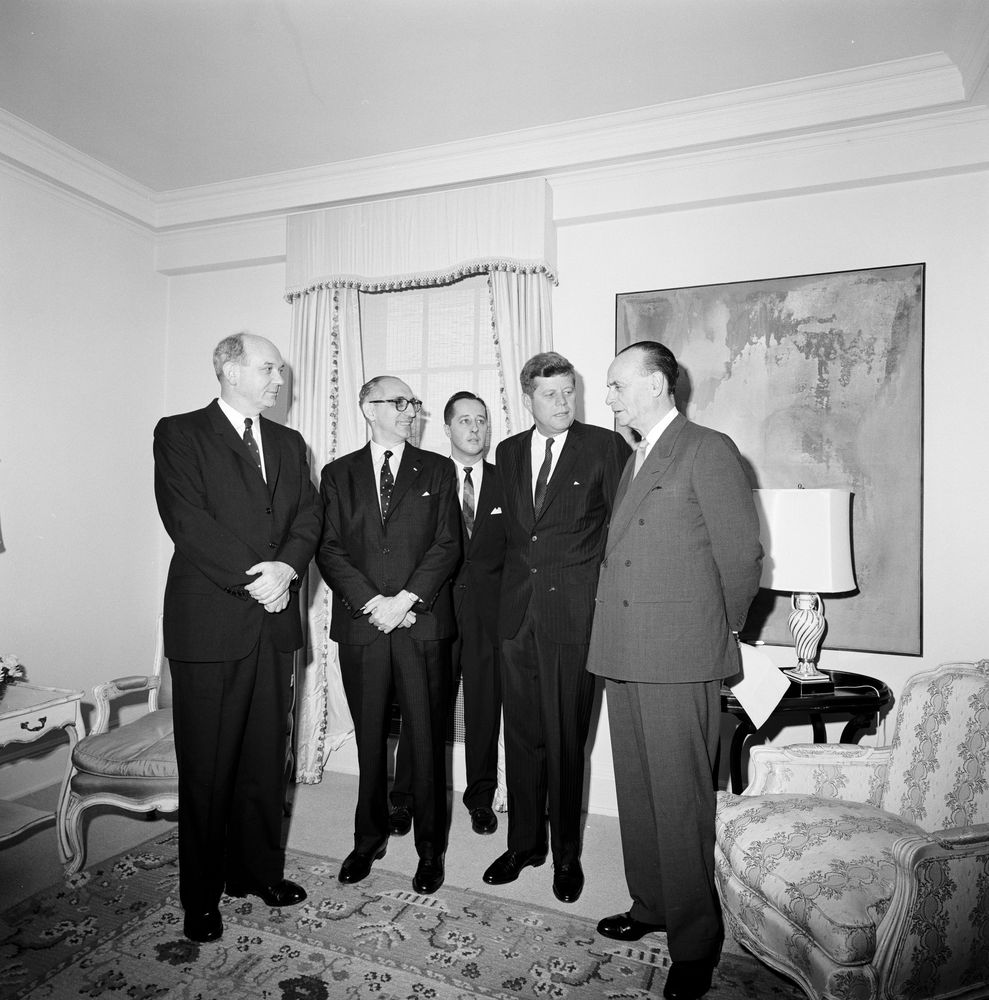
U.S. president John F. Kennedy and Argentine president Arturo Frondizi at the hotel

U.S. presidents from Harry S. Truman to Bill Clinton have stayed at the Carlyle, leading news media to refer to the hotel as the "White House of Manhattan". Truman was the first U.S. president to stay there, taking walks around the neighborhood every morning when he began using the hotel in 1948 during visits to New York. The Carlyle did not gain a reputation as a presidential hotel until John F. Kennedy lived there. Kennedy owned a seven-room apartment on the 34th and 35th stories, where he stayed just prior to his inauguration in January 1961. The Kennedy family stayed at the hotel sporadically during his presidency; after Kennedy was assassinated, his widow Jacqueline Kennedy Onassis stayed there with their children. The hotel also had secret tunnels, which Marilyn Monroe reportedly used when she visited Kennedy. In addition, first lady Nancy Reagan stayed at the hotel frequently during her husband's presidency. When Clinton visited the hotel, he had to use the hotel's tunnels to avoid paparazzi. The Carlyle's staff kept a collection of wine specifically for whenever the U.S. president visited.

The Carlyle was the last place John F. Kennedy Jr. ate breakfast before he, his wife, and his wife's sister were killed in the 1999 Martha's Vineyard plane crash. Diana, Princess of Wales, frequently stayed at the Carlyle before her death. Several British prime ministers have stayed at the hotel, including Harold Wilson, Margaret Thatcher, and Tony Blair. The Carlyle has also hosted other heads of state, including Indian prime minister Indira Gandhi, Ethiopian emperor Haile Selassie, and Canadian prime minister Lester Pearson. According to Carlyle Hotel managing director Marlene Poynder, members of the royal families of Denmark, Greece, Spain, and Sweden have stayed at the hotel. Other politicians who stayed at the Carlyle have included UN secretary-general Kurt Waldheim, New York City mayor Robert F. Wagner, former U.S. secretary of state Madeleine Albright and former U.S. postmaster general Frank C. Walker. In March 2026, John and Jackie Kennedy's Carlyle Hotel penthouse was acquired by Barry Diller.

=== Other figures ===
In the Carlyle's early years, figures such as Truman Capote, Frank Sinatra, and George Harrison frequently gathered at the hotel, and the actress Ingrid Bergman was among the relative few celebrity tenants. During World War II, the banker André Meyer, who had been exiled from his native France, lived at the hotel so that he could escape within 24 hours if needed. A 1992 Los Angeles Times article described the Carlyle as attracting "members of the capricious aristocracy of Hollywood". Among the celebrity guests mentioned by the Los Angeles Times were the musicians David Bowie, Michael Jackson, Elton John, and Leontyne Price, in addition to the actors Julie Andrews, Anjelica Huston, Jack Lemmon, Jack Nicholson, and Burt Reynolds. Other celebrity guests that have frequented the hotel have included Isabella Rossellini, Elizabeth Taylor, Madonna, Sophia Loren, Audrey Hepburn, Annette Bening, Warren Beatty, and Robin Williams. The designer Tom Ford regularly stayed on the Carlyle's 31st floor, while the tennis player Roger Federer often stayed on the 16th floor. Stephanie Savage, the screenwriter for the TV series Gossip Girl, stayed at the hotel and interviewed local girls while writing episodes for the series.

In the late 20th century, the businessman Henry Ford II owned a co-op apartment on the 34th and 35th floors. The hotel's other co-op owners have included the television and film producer Brad Grey, the art dealer Heinz Berggruen, the developer Sol Goldman, the journalist Gloria Steinem, the financier Michael Milken, and the director Mike Nichols. The businessman Mickey Drexler formerly lived in the Empire Suite, hiring Despont to design the suite. Several of the hotel's performers owned apartments in the building, including Marian McPartland and Elaine Stritch. Mick Jagger maintained a pied-à-terre at the Carlyle, as did the fashion designer Diane von Fürstenberg. In addition, the publisher Leonardo Mondadori rented out his apartment in the building to figures such as actor Randy Quaid and fashion designer Calvin Klein, and the fashion designer Hubert de Givenchy also rented out his apartment there. The filmmaker Ron Howard, who also lived at the Carlyle, gave one of his daughters the middle name Carlyle, after the hotel.

Several members of foreign royal families have also stayed at the Carlyle over the years. The royal guests have included members of British royalty, including Princess Diana, Princess Alexandra, William and Catherine of Wales, Prince Philip and Prince Edward of Edinburgh, and Princess Michael of Kent. Other foreign royals who have stayed at the Carlyle include Princess Grace of Monaco; King Hussein of Jordan; and the monarchs of Denmark, Sweden, Spain, and Greece.

== Impact ==
=== Critical reception ===
==== Cultural commentary ====
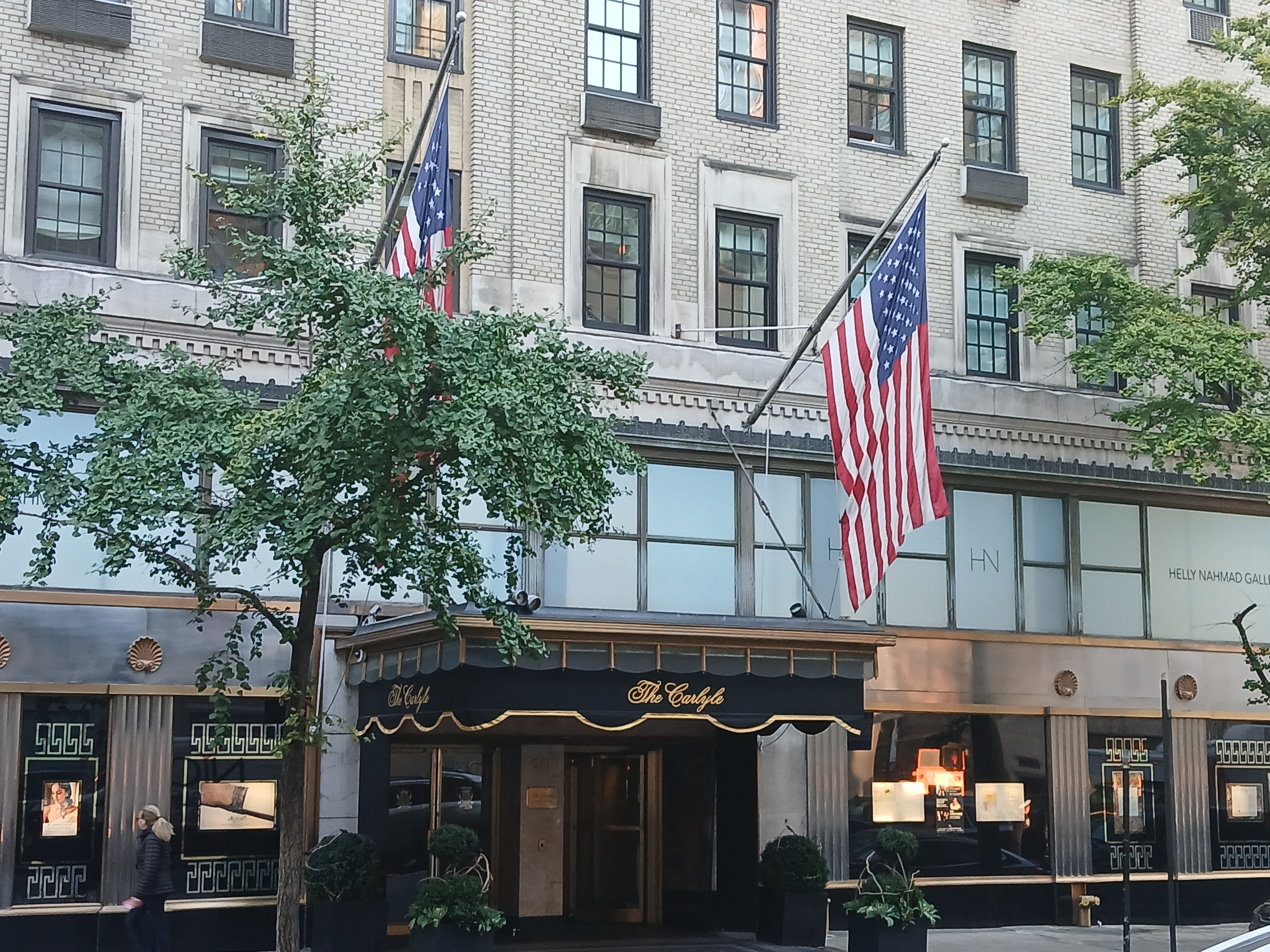
Entrance to the Café Carlyle and Bemelmans Bar

In 1969, a writer for Town & Country magazine described the Carlyle Hotel as "a favorite with the famous and the fashionable" and that its Bemelmans Bar and Regency Room were of particular note. Another writer for the same magazine said the hotel catered to those who preferred to stay in a residential neighborhood and wanted easy access to art galleries and antique shops, while a Boston Globe reporter wrote that the Carlyle "symbolizes the elan of the Upper East Side". The Sun Sentinel wrote in 1989 that the Carlyle was "an island of civility and sublime gentility", contrasting with the rest of the city. Not all commentary was positive; a writer for Women's Wear Daily characterized the clientele as "stuffy rich", and a Los Angeles Times article in 1986 described the Carlyle as being as elegant as the St. Regis New York but with a more somber undertone.

The Los Angeles Times wrote in 1992 that "the last thing the Carlyle has ever wanted to be is ordinary", in part because of its personalized service, and Town & Country wrote that "just the name [Carlyle] evokes 1930s New York movie glamour". According to Institutional Investor, the Carlyle "feels, functions, and epitomizes the way a grand residence would be", both because of its service and the design of its apartments. When the hotel was being sold in 2000, Vogue described the Carlyle as "grand but not pretentious; wonderfully efficient without any officious coldness; associated with stately, older names but home to a young, chic clientele". The Independent described the hotel as "uptown in every sense" because of its service, style, and luxurious offerings, while CN Traveler praised the hotel as symbolizing the city's spirit. A Financial Times writer described the Carlyle as "a monument to the elite". Conversely, a 2018 Observer article lamented that much of the hotel's upscale character had eroded away.

There has also been commentary on the Carlyle's restaurants and cafes. Vogue magazine described the Carlyle Restaurant as "stylishly homey" with a lively social scene and breakfast cuisine, while Town & Country likened it to a private club in London. One writer described the Café Carlyle as a club "where the performers sing as if they're in their living rooms, and as if you belong there with them". A Chicago Tribune writer similarly described the Café Carlyle as luxurious and intimate, and a writer for Time Out New York described the Café Carlyle as a "big night out without the fuss". Business Insider described the Bemelmans Bar as a "cultural touchstone"; the Hartford Courant characterized the bar as having an "inherent darkness"; and Punch characterized the bar as one of the city's "most well-known hidden treasures". Another writer, for the Financial Times, referred to the Bemelmans Bar as having a "dusky" atmosphere that evoked the mid-20th century.

==== Architectural and hotel commentary ====
The architectural critic Christopher Gray wrote that, when the Carlyle was built, it had pierced the neighborhood's skyline like a "movie cowboy thrown through a stage-glass saloon window". During the mid-1930s, one writer described the Carlyle as one of several "smart apartments" in Lenox Hill that had opened in the 1920s and 1930s. Another reporter wrote for Vogue magazine in 1940 that Dorothy Draper's interior decorations were "as suave as a shrewdly-painted face". A writer for Women's Wear Daily characterized the rooms in 1972 elaborately decorated and slightly dated. The architectural critic Paul Goldberger wrote that the hotel's pinnacle "brings a sense of life" to the neighborhood's skyline, where white-brick towers predominated, and he also described the Carlyle as one of several structures whose shapes "exemplify the peculiar blend of romance and energy that is Manhattan". A writer for Vogue described the hotel building's turrets as "defining the skyline of Manhattan's Upper East Side".

A writer for the Los Angeles Times praised the residential ambiance of the rooms, and another writer for The Independent wrote that the rooms "are designed for normal-sized people". Writing about one of the hotel's suites in 1995, Susan Spano of The New York Times characterized the suite as well-decorated, with subtle details such as miniature closet lights and discreet envelopes, but that the room was "not the stuff of fantasy". Writing for Town & Country in 1994, Ila Stanger regarded the rooms as being elegant but not extravagant, saying that there was "no Eighties excess, no marble walls in the bathrooms". A 2022 review for The Telegraph gave the Carlyle a ranking of 9/10 and praised the hotel's location, ambiance, and cuisine. New York magazine praised the hotel for its history and large suites, though the magazine also found the atmosphere to be stuffy. In 2025, Grazia magazine wrote that the rooms were filled with "custom fabrics, rich wood paneling, and Art Deco flourishes that pay homage to the hotel’s early days".

There has also been commentary about the lobby and other public spaces. A writer for Women's Wear Daily characterized the lobby in 1972 as "small and elegant", saying that its ambiance "reeked" of permanent residents and short-term guests. New York magazine reporter Marie Brenner wrote that the Carlyle's small, relatively simple lobby belied the high social stature of its guests and residents, while the Montreal Gazette characterized the lobby as evidence of "the hotel's cozy elegance". Another writer, for The New York Times, described the design of the Carlyle's lobby as "enough to inspire repeat visits". As for the dining room, a Women's Wear Daily article from 1978 described that space as "an unconscious parody of itself". The Independent wrote that the hotel was ideal for families because of the views from the upper stories and because of the Madeline-themed activities and events there.

The Carlyle has frequently ranked as one of the best hotels in both New York City and the world. In 1988, Crain's New York wrote that the Carlyle was frequently praised for its design and service and that many hotel operators spoke of being as good as the Carlyle, if not better. A 1970s edition of Egon Ronay's Lucas Guide ranked the Carlyle as the third-best hotel in New York City (tied with the Mayfair Regent), and the Institutional Investor also ranked the Carlyle among North America's best hotels in the 1980s. The Carlyle first received five-star ratings from the Mobil Travel Guide in 1969, a ranking it consistently held through the late 20th century; however, the hotel lost this ranking in 2000. Travel + Leisure magazine dubbed the Carlyle as "New York's Best Hotel" in 2010, and in the 2024 edition of the World's 50 Best Hotels, the Carlyle was ranked as the 30th-best hotel in the world. The first edition of the Michelin Keys Guide, in 2024, ranked the Carlyle as a "two-key" hotel, the second-highest accolade granted by the Michelin Keys Guide.

=== Media ===
The Carlyle has also been depicted in several films and TV shows throughout the years, either as a filming location or as a setting. For example, the 2008 film Sex and the City was partly shot at the Carlyle, and the 2015 film A Very Murray Christmas was set in the Carlyle and in Bemelmans Bar. The hotel was also the subject of a 2018 documentary film by the writer-director Matthew Miele, Always at The Carlyle. In addition, decorations from the Carlyle Hotel's rooms were replicated in the 2022 film Tár.

== See also ==
- List of hotels in New York City
