= Perrin Paris =

PERRIN PARIS 1893
- Industry: Fashion
- Founded: 1893
- Founder: Victor Rigaudy
- Headquarters: Paris, France
- Area served: Europe, and the Americas
- Key people: Michel Perrin Sally Perrin Chloe Perrin Emmanuelle Perrin
- Products: accessories
- Website: www.perrinparis.com

PERRIN PARIS is a French leather accessories brand with shops in Paris, New York City, Los Angeles, Tokyo and Hong Kong.

== History ==
PERRIN PARIS was founded in Saint-Junien, France.

In 2009 Perrin Paris opened a boutique in Beverly Hills, followed by the New York City location on Madison Avenue at the historic Carlyle Hotel. The Paris flagship, located steps away from Place Vendôme, and the Hong Kong shop at the luxurious IFC Mall opened in 2015. Perrin also inaugurated its first shop in Japan in Tokyo G6 Mall.

The house's design studio and showroom is based in the 1st arrondissement of Paris, France.
