= Carlyle Restaurant =

Restaurant in New York City

- Interactive map of Carlyle Restaurant

Restaurant information
- Established: 1930; 96 years ago
- Head chef: Mark Richardson
- Food type: Contemporary American cuisine
- Dress code: Jackets required for dinner.
- Location: 35 East 76th Street (at Madison Ave), on the Upper East Side, in Manhattan, New York, New York, 10021, United States
- Coordinates: 40.774371°N 73.96318°W
- Seating capacity: 90
- Website: www.rosewoodhotels.com

The Carlyle Restaurant, formerly Dumonet at the Carlyle, is a Contemporary American cuisine restaurant located at 35 East 76th Street (at Madison Ave), in the back of the Carlyle Hotel, on the Upper East Side in Manhattan, in New York City. It was established in 1930.

== Menu ==
The Contemporary American cuisine is fresh and seasonal, and includes local items such as New Jersey scallops and Dover sole. The Executive Chef is Mark Richardson.

== Restaurant ==
The elegant, gracious, plush restaurant is decorated in the style of an English manor house. It seats 90 diners, and has dark mahogany decor lightened by large floral arrangements. Zagats described the restaurant as "Dorothy Draper"–esque. Jackets are required for dinner.

== Reviews ==
In 2013, Zagats gave it a food rating of 24, with a decor rating that was the second-highest on the Upper East Side, at 27.

In 2000, Forbes gave it four stars. In a 2002 review in The New York Times, entitled "A Frump Does Something About It", William Grimes gave it one star and wrote that: "The Carlyle Restaurant used to feel like one big frayed cuff. Now it takes its rightful place alongside the dining rooms in Manhattan's finest hotels." The following year he gave it two stars.

== See also ==
- List of New American restaurants
