= George Feyer (pianist) =

Hungarian musician

George Feyer (Hungary, 27 October 1908 – New York, 21 October 2001) was a classically trained pianist who turned to 'light' music upon graduating, and released a series of top-selling "Echoes of..." records on Vox Records. Feyer was born György Fejér, but westernised his name after leaving Europe. (Feher means 'white' in Hungarian, and "Fejér is thus the equivalent of the antiquated spelling of the English name "Whyte".)

== Life ==
=== Early life and career in Europe ===
Feyer remembered as a young boy hating his piano practice so much that his mother, a piano teacher, had to tie his legs to the piano stool. He studied at the Franz Liszt Academy of Music in Budapest [alongside conductor Sir Georg Solti], and at the Budapest Conservatory of Music. Among his teachers were Ernő Dohnányi, Zoltán Kodály, Zoltán Székely, and Béla Bartók. By this time he was developing an interest in light music and was playing in the evenings in many of the boîtes around Budapest, such as the Cafe Dunacorso where he accompanied Zsuzsa Darvas, a popular diseuse.

Feyer graduated, aged 23, in 1932 and caused a minor scandal by turning to pop music full-time. It is ironic that he became a pianist after having been a student of composition and conducting, whereas his classmate Georg Solti, a piano prodigy, became one of the world's most acclaimed conductors.

One of Feyer's first jobs was accompanying silent films, but he soon moved to night clubs, and it was not long before he and his drummer began working around Europe. His first trip away from Budapest was in 1934, to Barcelona, Spain.

For the next five years he toured Europe. In Paris a great fan was the exiled Duke of Windsor (previously Edward VIII of the United Kingdom, who had abdicated the throne of England in December 1936, and who lived in France from 1937 to 1939). The Duke particularly liked the accordion, so Feyer and his drummer drew straws to decide which of them would have to learn to play it. The drummer lost, and Feyer was able to continue playing the piano.

In 1939 Feyer returned to Hungary to be with his family, but was moved to German factories in a forced labour brigade. He was imprisoned in Bergen-Belsen concentration camp in the last year of the war, from where he was rescued in 1945 by the Allies.

Feyer returned to Budapest, and in late 1945 married Judith Hoffman, whom he had met during the war. The couple had a son (Robert, b. Budapest, November 1946), and Feyer continued his musical career, playing in the Allied Officers' Club in Budapest (there was four-power nominal occupation in all the former Axis powers, although in Eastern Europe the bulk of the troops were Soviet). After the establishment of Russian Stalinist Communist rule, Feyer fled to Switzerland in January 1948, where he had found a job playing at a resort hotel. He persuaded the owners to allow him to bring his family. At the time he played in a duo with a drummer, whose wife came too.

By the time the original contract was fulfilled, the Iron Curtain had truly dropped and Feyer and his drummer (also named George) decided not to return to Hungary, fearing persecution based on their contact with Western powers. They stayed in Switzerland, gaining popularity through successive jobs at the big hotels. By 1950, when Hungary revolted, Switzerland would not allow them to become permanent residents on old Hungarian passports.

=== Career in New York City ===
Feyer’s younger brother Paul had left Europe before the war, and went to Venezuela. While there, Paul won a lottery, and used the money to come to New York City, where he settled with the existing Hungarian community. He quickly married a young woman from within that community, and thereby got permanent U.S. residency and later citizenship. Feyer's father had died during the war, probably of alcoholism, and Paul had brought their mother to the U.S. in 1947. Having two immediate family members in the U.S. helped George Feyer to obtain a visa. (Feyer's mother lived for another forty years in New York, dying at the age of 102, in 1987.) The family arrived and settled in New York in January, 1951, changing the spelling of the name to Feyer almost immediately, as his brother Paul had done, to make it easier to pronounce, and to get work. George's family became U.S. citizens in 1956 after the requisite five-year waiting period. Feyer lived there for the rest of his life. (Feyer's drummer and his wife were also able to come to the United States, but they did not continue to work together in New York.)

Within a few months of arrival he made his New York debut at the famous Gogi's La Rue, in The Plush Room. From 1951 to 1954 Feyer had a regular spot in Park Avenue's Delmonico Hotel [now known as Trump Park Avenue]. It was during this period that Feyer began his recording career, making his first record Echoes of Paris in 1953. (Although Feyer made his recordings with light accompaniment, all his hotel and nightclub shows were solo.)

A handful more such records appeared in the next couple of years, and in 1955 Feyer signed a contract with New York's luxurious boutique hotel The Carlyle to appear in their Café Carlyle. He performed there for 13 years in a room specially set up for him, with decor provided by a Hungarian interior designer. In August 1968, when he took his usual vacation on Nantucket Island, Bobby Short was hired to cover for him. In Short's words, "He took off two weeks that summer, and Peter Sharp, who owns The Carlyle, asked Ahmet and Nesuhi Ertegün, of Atlantic Records, who to get as a replacement. They said, ‘Get Bobby Short.’ I did my best to make those two weeks as successful as anything I’d done, and when Feyer’s contract ran out they offered me half a year. Feyer found a better deal elsewhere, and I work there now eight months of the year." The management had changed, and the move turned out to be permanent. Short was to remain at The Carlyle for a fabled uninterrupted run until 2004, the year before his death.

Feyer joked that he had "taken the most expensive vacation of them all," and his son later said that he never set foot in The Carlyle again. However he soon found work in the Stanhope Hotel's Rembrandt Room. Feyer remained there for 12 years, until 1980. He spent his remaining two years of active performing at the Hideaway Room in the Waldorf-Astoria, another famous hotel in New York.

Feyer retired in December 1982, after the death of his wife. In 1985 he remarried the former Marta Kleyman (a cousin of his brother Paul's first wife), and continued to appear at private parties and occasional hotel engagements, mostly as favours to friends, particularly in Palm Springs, California, where his second wife owned a home. For many years, until no longer physically able to do so (in 1999), he played weekly at the Memorial Sloan-Kettering Cancer Center, where he had been volunteering since 1961.

Feyer died just six days before his 93rd birthday, at Lenox Hill Hospital in Manhattan's Upper East Side. He was survived by his son (who lives in San Francisco), three grandsons, and second wife (who died within the year after he died).

The Department of Music at Princeton University dedicated a "George and Judith Feyer Practice Room" to their memory on 2 June 2003.

== Recordings ==
From 1953 to 1956, Feyer released a series of LPs on the VOX record label. The records were all similarly entitled Echoes of .... The first, Echoes of Paris, was a huge hit, leading to 12 others. The music consisted of popular songs and melodies, played by Feyer on the piano in his own inimitable arrangements, with light guitar and rhythm accompaniment.

In 1957 Feyer released his only two records with orchestra: one each of the songs of Cole Porter and Jerome Kern. From 1958 to 1959 Feyer recorded four albums for RCA Victor, and in 1960 he recorded his first live album An Evening At The Café Carlyle, for Cadence Records.

From the early 1960s onwards Feyer recorded a series of albums [including a second live album] for Decca, who also reissued three of his VOX records.

In 1969 Feyer recorded an LP for Kapp Records. Sometime after 1970 he recorded his third live album, At The Stanhope, which was available only from The Stanhope itself. Feyer's final three recordings were for Vanguard Records: The Essential George Gershwin (1974), The Essential Cole Porter (1976), and The Essential Jerome Kern (1978). These three double-albums are the only of Feyer's recordings subsequently to have been officially issued on CD. However the issue of the Jerome Kern CD is missing the six tracks from the original LP which had contained an integral cello part throughout. In addition, various other tracks on the original LP had contained briefer cello parts, and these sections of those tracks were also all cut from the CD issue. The cello player was Evangeline Benedetti, a cellist with the New York Philharmonic since 1967. She has said that she knows nothing about why her parts were comprehensively edited out of the CD issue of the recording.

== In literature ==
The 10-inch release of Feyer's first record, Echoes of Paris, is mentioned in Chapter 5 of Ian Fleming's fourth James Bond novel, Diamonds Are Forever (published 1956). The female character Tiffany Case calls it the “Best light record ever made.”

== Complete discography by record label ==
VOX - Echoes of series [ordered in sequence of 10" catalogue number]

Echoes of Paris [1953, 10" VX 500] [1953, 1956, 12" VX 25.200] 10" and 12" are different performances. 10" has two tracks not on 12"; 12" has two tracks not on 10"

Echoes of Vienna [1953, 10" VX 550] [1953, 1956, 12" VX 25.250] 10" has no tracks not on 12"; 12" has two tracks not on 10"

Echoes of Italy [10" VX 620] [1953, 1956, 12" VX 25.320] 10" has no tracks not on 12"; 12" has two tracks not on 10"

Echoes of Broadway [1954, 10" VX 650] [1954, 1956, 12" VX 25.350] 10" has two tracks not on 12"; 12" has three tracks not on 10"

Echoes of Latin America [1954, 1956, 12" VX 25.370] 10" has no tracks not on 12"; 12" has two tracks not on 10"

Echoes of Childhood [10" VX 710] [12" VX 25.410] 10" has no tracks not on 12"; 12" has four tracks not on 10"

More Echoes of Paris [10" VX 730] [1955, 1956, 12" VX 25.430] 10" has no tracks not on 12"; 12" has three tracks not on 10"

Echoes of Hollywood [10" VX 800] [1955, 1956, 12" VX 25.400] [NB sides 1 and 2 reversed between 10" and 12"] 10" has no tracks not on 12"; 12" has one track not on 10"

Echoes of Budapest [1955, 10" VX 850] [1955, 1956, 12" VX 25.450] 10" has no tracks not on 12"; 12" has two tracks not on 10"

Echoes of Christmas [10" VX 860] [1955, 12" VX 25.010] [NB 10" tracks in different order] 10" has no tracks not on 12"; 12" has four tracks not on 10"

Echoes of Continent [1957, 10" VX 880] [was there a 12"?] [one new track; all others are re-recordings of tracks which appear on previous records]

Echoes of Spain [10" VX 910] [1956, 12" VX 25.070] 10" has no tracks not on 12"; 12" has two tracks not on 10"

My Fair Lady [12" VX 25.340]

Jerome Kern [1957, 12" VX 25.500] [was there a 10"?]

Cole Porter [1957, 10" VX 1270] [1957, 12" VX 25.510] 10" and 12" identical

The King and I & Carousel [1956, 10" VX 21.300] [1956, 12" PL 21.300] [NB 10" tracks in different order] King & I 10" missing “Something Wonderful” (from 12"); Carousel 10" missing “Soliloquy” and “Reprise” (from 12")

This is Feyer [12" “Voxample” LP SFP-1] introduction to eight VOX Echoes LPs: Italy, Vienna, Christmas, Paris, Spain, Latin America, Budapest, Childhood [all tracks piano solo only (no rhythm accompaniment); not the performances used on the LPs]

RCA Victor

South Pacific & Oklahoma! [1958, mono 12" LPM-1731]

Memories of Viennese Operettas [1958, mono 12" RD-27130 (UK) / LPM-1862 (US)]

Memories of Popular Operas [1958, stereo 12" LSP-1926]

Today’s Hits Tomorrow’s Memories [1959, mono 12" LPM-2051]

Music for a Mellow Mood [mono 12" 12-track compilation CPM 119] [RCA Victor Record Club exclusive] [no original material; all tracks taken from previous two RCA Victor LPs]

Cadence

An Evening at the Café Carlyle [1960, 12" stereo live Cadence LP CLP 25051]

DECCA series

I Still Like To Play French Songs The Best [stereo 12" DL 74333]

But Oh! Those Italian Melodies [mono 12" DL 4411]

Latin Songs Everybody Knows [stereo 12" DL 74420]

Golden Waltzes Everybody Knows [mono 12" DL 4455]

A Nightcap with George Feyer [post-1964, mono 12" DL 4625]

Piano Magic Hollywood [post-1965, stereo 12" DL 74647]

My Fair Lady [mono 12" DL 4804] appears to be a reissue of VOX 12" LP

The New Echoes of Paris [stereo 12" DL 74808]

Echoes of Christmas [mono 12" DI 74814 ??] appears to be a reissue of VOX 12" LP

Echoes of Love [post-1966, stereo 12" DL 74858]

Echoes of Romance [stereo 12" DL 74902]

Echoes of Childhood [enhanced for stereo 12" DL 74907] appears to be a reissue of VOX 12" LP

Kapp

Dancing In the Dark My Way [1969, 12" stereo LP] Kapp KS-3611

Rembrandt

At the Stanhope [post-1970, Rembrandt Records live 12" LP, available only from The Stanhope 34845]

Echoes of Paris-Vienna-Italy: The best of three on one [Rembrandt Records 12" 34846] [no original material; compilation of tracks from three VOX LPs]

VANGUARD – “Essential” series [note discrepancy in sequence of LP release/recording dates and catalogue numbers]

George Gershwin [1974, 12" stereo double LP VSD 61/62] [CD OVC 6002] both issues identical

Cole Porter [1976, 12" stereo double LP VSD 93/94] [CD OVC 6014] both issues identical

Jerome Kern [rec. 1978, 12" stereo double LP VSD 87/88] [CD OVC 6015] CD issue is missing the six tracks on the LP which had contained a continuous cello part. [There are further tracks on the LP which contain brief cello parts, but these tracks were included on the CD issue with the cello edited out.]
