= Jerome L. Greene =

American lawyer and businessman (1906–99)

Jerome L. Greene (1909–1999) was a prominent New York lawyer, real estate investor, and philanthropist.

== Early years and education ==
Greene was born in Brooklyn in 1909. Greene graduated from Columbia College in 1926 and Columbia Law School in 1928.

== Business career ==
Greene was a founding partner of the Manhattan law firm Marshall, Bratter, Greene, Allison & Tucker. As a real estate investor he was the principal owner of the Carlyle Hotel.

== Philanthropy ==
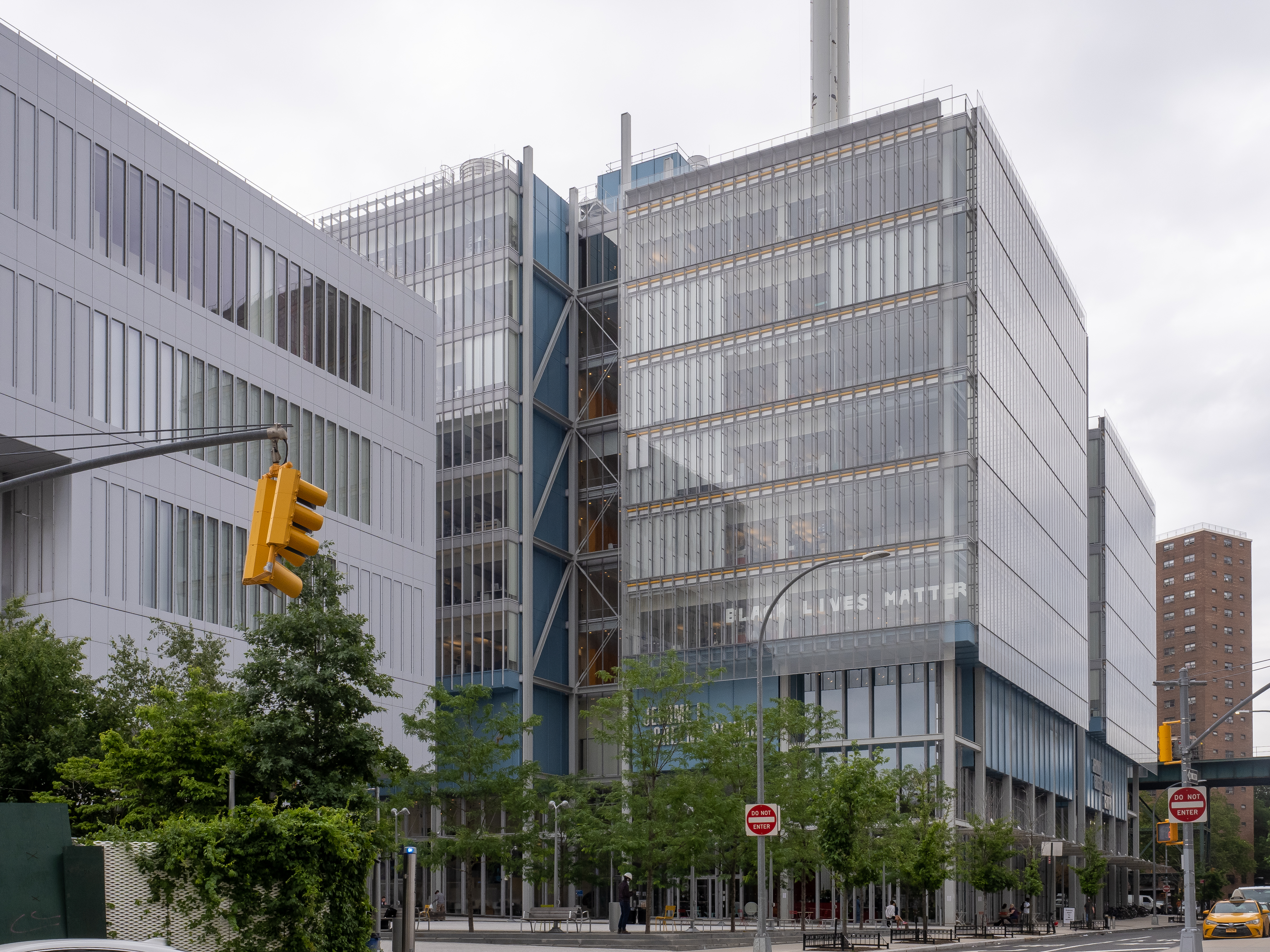
Jerome L Greene Science Center

Over the years, Greene and his wife Dawn contributed over $40 million to Columbia Law School as well as significant contributions to WNYC public radio. The WNYC Greene Space was named in his honor. In 2006, the Jerome L. Greene Foundation donated $200 million to Columbia University, the largest gift that the school had ever received, to establish The Jerome L. Greene Science Center. Greene was a major patron of the arts, among other things, serving as chairman of the board of the Hirshhorn Museum, a member of Lincoln Center's board of directors, and as a trustee of the Juilliard School.

== The Jerome L. Greene Foundation ==
The Jerome L. Greene Foundation supports the arts, education, health, and social justice. Founded in 1978, its assets were valued at $660 million by the end of 2019.
