= GoldenTree Asset Management =

American asset management firm

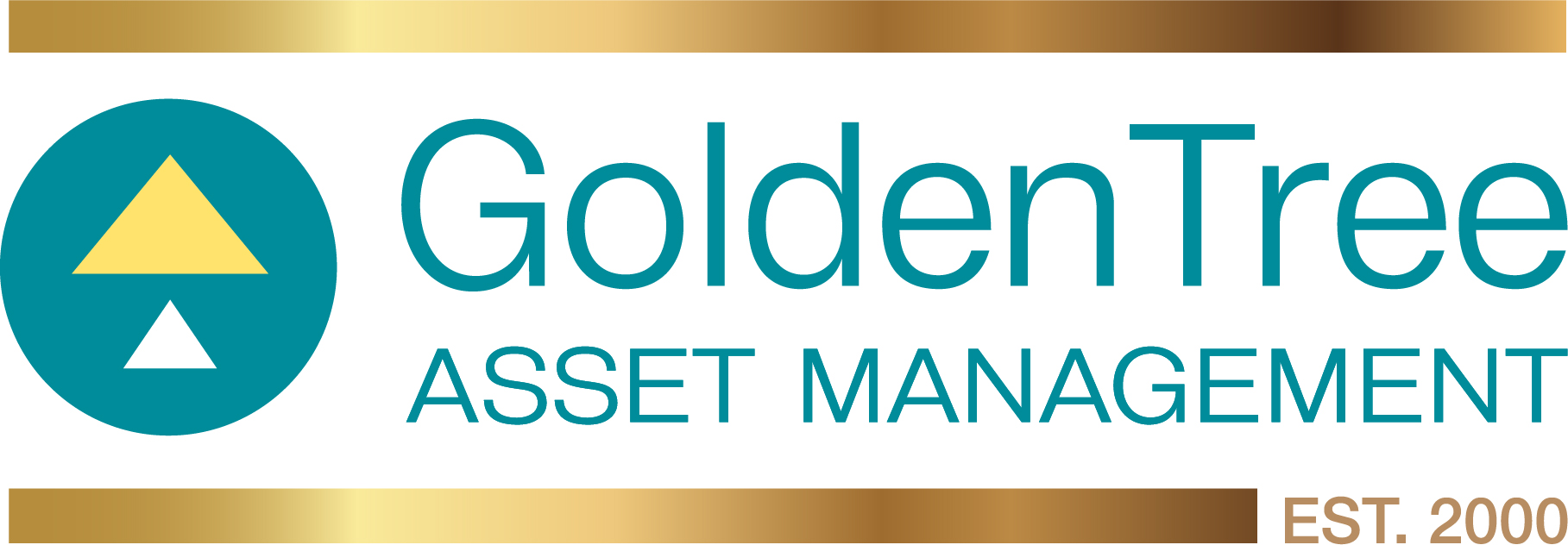
- Type: Privately held
- Industry: Asset Management
- Founded: 2000
- Founder: Steven Tananbaum
- Headquarters: New York City, US
- Key people: Steve Tananbaum (Chief Investment Officer), William Christian (Chief Operating Officer) 2004-2020, Barry Ritholz (General Counsel) 2001-2021
- AUM: US $65 billion (2026)
- Number of employees: 270
- Website: https://www.goldentree.com

GoldenTree Asset Management is an American asset management firm that was founded in 2000. The firm has its headquarters in New York City and offices in West Palm Beach, Florida, Charlotte, North Carolina, Dublin, London, Singapore, Sydney, Tokyo, and Dubai.

== History ==
The firm was founded in 2000 by chief investment officer Steven Tananbaum. In 2013, the firm was ranked in Bloomberg's 100 Top-Performing Large Hedge Funds. As of 2021, GoldenTree had over 270 employees.

== Investment strategy ==
GoldenTree is a global credit manager that focuses on credit opportunities across high-yield bonds; leveraged loans; distressed, structured products; and emerging markets debt. In 2022, GoldenTree added cryptocurrency investing to its asset classes under management. It is one of the world’s largest independent asset managers focused on credit.

GoldenTree manages over $65 billion for institutional investors including public and corporate pensions, endowments, foundations, and sovereign wealth funds.
