= Steven Tananbaum =

American hedge fund manager

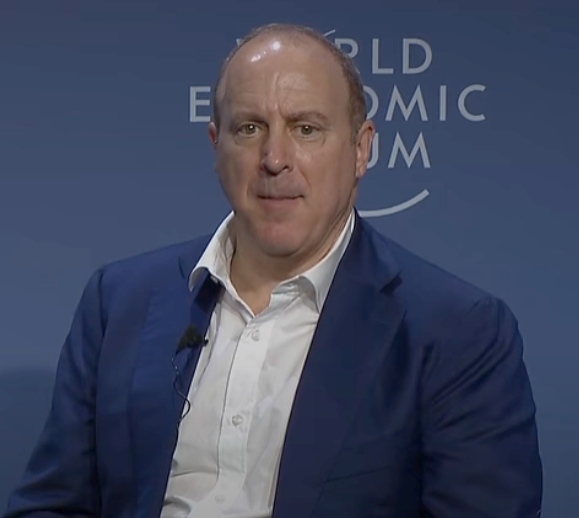
- Tananbaum in 2024
- Born: 1964 or 1965 (age 60–61)
- Education: Vassar College
- Occupation: Hedge fund manager
- Known for: Founder and chief investment officer, GoldenTree Asset Management
- Spouse: Lisa A. Munster

Steven Andrew Tananbaum (born 1964 or 1965) is an American hedge fund manager. He is the chief investment officer of GoldenTree Asset Management, which he founded in 2000. He manages the firm's investment team and oversees the executive committee. In 2018, Bloomberg referred to Tananbaum as "one of Wall Street’s biggest investors in distressed debt."

== Career ==
Tananbaum worked for Kidder, Peabody & Co., before joining MacKay Shields, where he led the firm's high yield group. He left in 2000 and founded GoldenTree Asset Management.

As of July 2023, GoldenTree had about $50 billion in assets under management (AUM).

== Personal life ==
Tananbaum is a Vassar College graduate. In 1992, Tananbaum married Lisa A. Munster. They live in Palm Beach, Florida. As of April 2023, Tananbaum had an estimated net worth of about $2.28 billion.

Tananbaum is a member of the Council on Foreign Relations.

== Art collecting ==
=== Collection ===
Tananbaum's art collection includes works by Damien Hirst, Brice Marden, Ellsworth Kelly, Frank Stella, Willem de Kooning, Gerhard Richter, Jenny Saville, Takashi Murakami, Andreas Gursky, and Tom Sachs.

=== Legal proceedings ===
In 2018 Tananbaum sued the Gagosian Gallery (Tananbaum v. Gagosian Gallery, 651889/2018) "over the non-delivery of three Koons sculptures" claiming that deposits were accepted and delivery of the works, including a "Balloon Venus", were delayed. In January 2020, an agreement was filed in Manhattan Supreme Court and the case was settled; terms were undisclosed.

== Philanthropy ==
In 2017, the Tananbaums gave $1 million to endow a curatorial position at the Block Museum of Art at Northwestern University.
