= Anderson Galleries =

Anderson Galleries began as an auctioner of books, and prints in New York City and comprised the Anderson Auction Company and Metropolitan Art Association. It was founded by John Anderson Jr. in 1900 and later renamed Anderson Galleries. In 1917, the gallery began selling antiques and art at their new location on Park Avenue and 59th Street, after previously being located at Madison Avenue and 40th Street . In the 1920s, Mitchell Kennerley, who ran the business, sold the works of Marsden Hartley, photographs of Alfred Stieglitz, and the works of Georgia O'Keeffe, John Marin, and Charles Demuth.

In 1926, Anderson Galleries took over important art sales from the American Art Association, beginning with the Viscount Leverhulme auction. Collector Cortlandt Field Bishop, owner of the American Art Association, bought Anderson Galleries in 1927. In 1929, the establishments merged to be the American Art Association-Anderson Galleries, Inc. and operated at 30 East 57th Street in Manhattan. It sold decorative arts, American and Italian antiques, and modern and antique art, like works of the Barbizon School. In 1932, an exhibition of Israel Sack, a dealer of decorative arts and furniture, was held at American Art Association-Anderson Galleries.

== Gallery ==
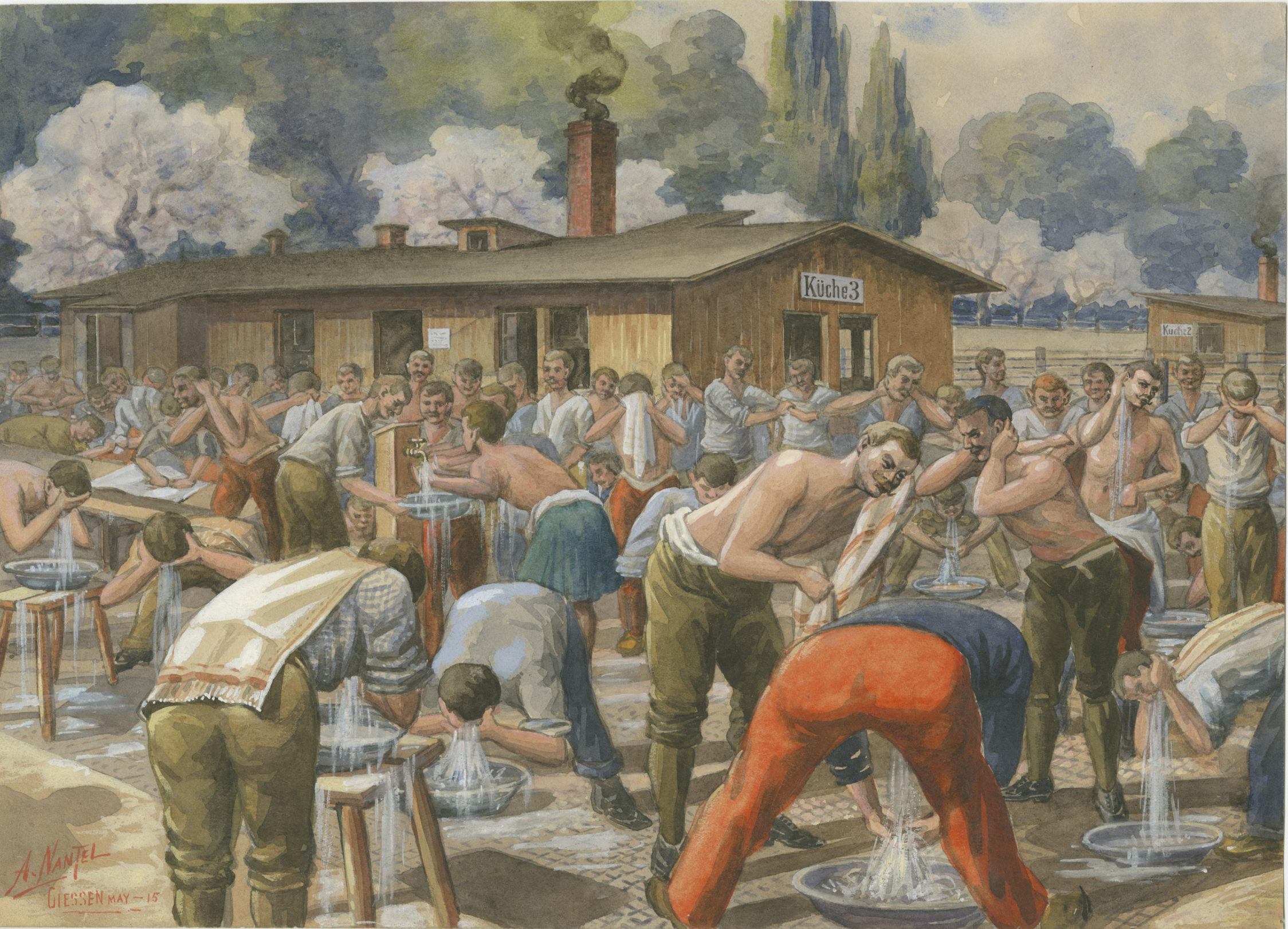
Arthur Nantel, Every Day in the Week 6 a.m., May 1915, watercolor on paper, Canadian War Museum. Canadian War Memorials Exhibition, New York, 1919, Anderson Galleries, June 10, 1919 - July 31, 1919

== Bibliography ==
- Norton, Thomas E. (1984). 100 years of collecting in America : the story of Sotheby Parke Bernet. New York: H.N. Abrams. ISBN 978-0-8109-1615-9.
