= Thomas Ellis Kirby =

American auctioneer

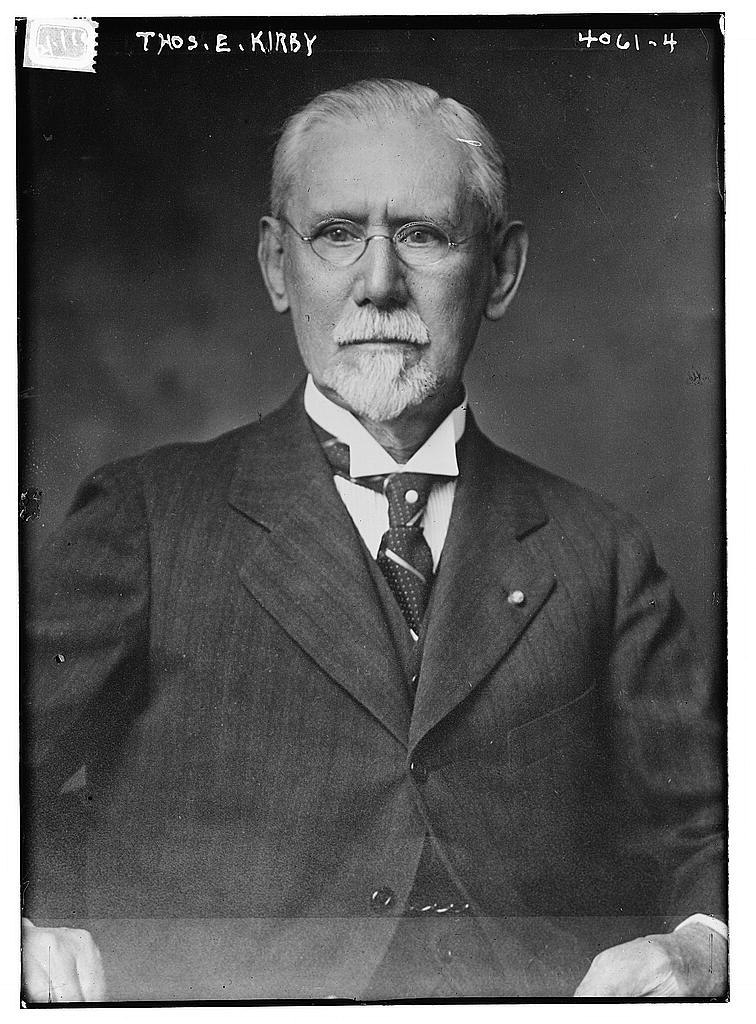
- Born: 1846
- Died: 1923 (aged 76–77)
- Occupation: Auctioner

Thomas Ellis Kirby (1846–1924) was an auctioneer at American Art Galleries. He was known as the "grand old man of the auction room".

== Biography ==
He was born in 1846. He married and had a son, Gustavus T. Kirby.

He was one of the three founders of the American Art Association (AAA) in 1883 in New York.

He died in 1924.
