= American Art Association =

- Established: 1883; 143 years ago
- Location: Manhattan, New York City, New York
- Type: Art Gallery and Auction House

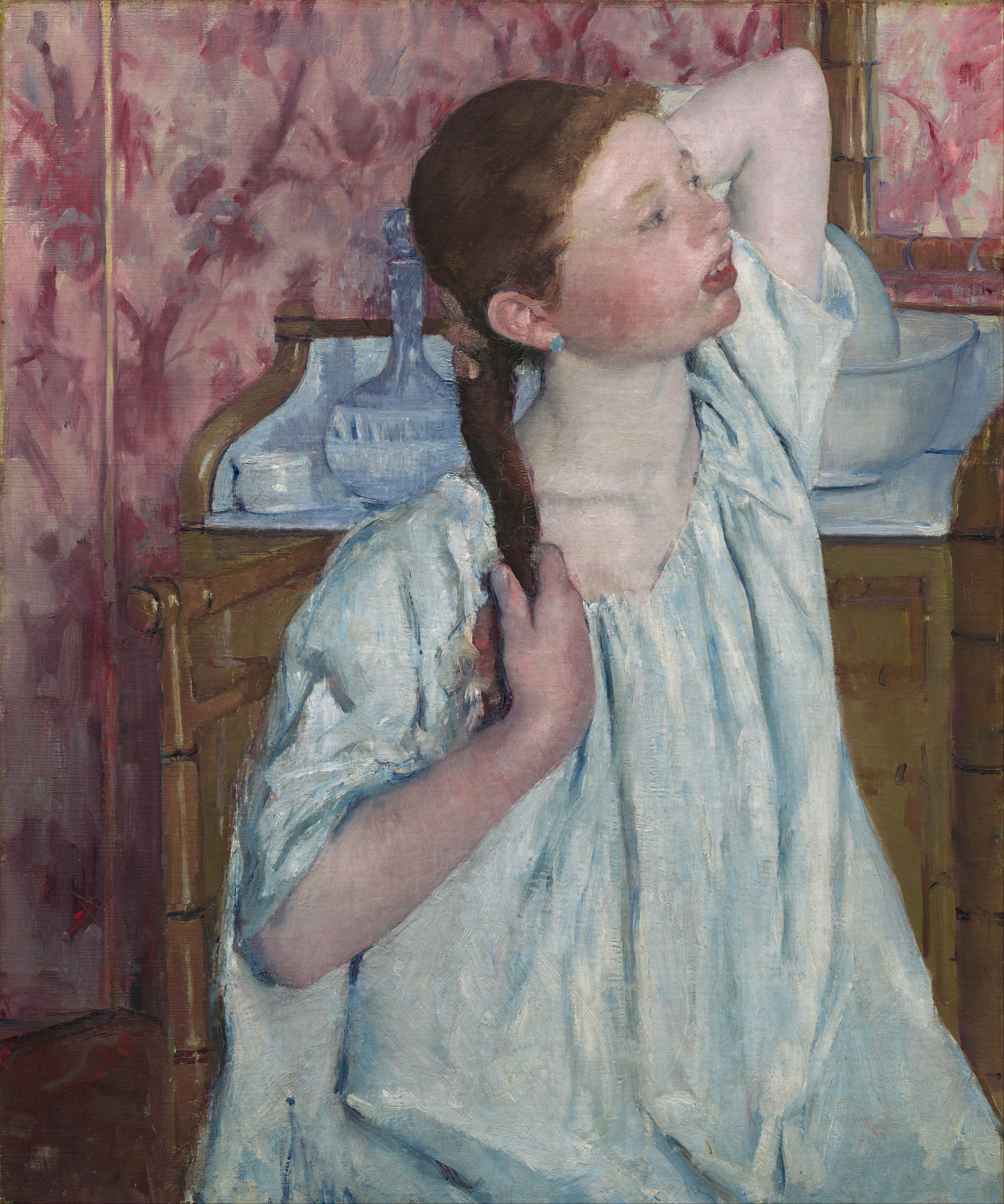
Mary Cassatt - Girl Arranging Her Hair - Painting for Sale at the American Art Association, Anderson Galleries, New York, 10 April 1930, no. 75

The American Art Association was an art gallery and auction house with sales galleries, established in 1883.

It was first located at 6 East 23rd Street (South Madison Square) in Manhattan, New York City and moved to Madison Ave and 56th St. in 1922. It was the first auction house in the U.S. and had a strong presence in New York during the period of American history known as the Gilded Age, hosting some of the cities major art exhibitions at the time. The galleries and auctions were devoted to paintings by American artists and also had an Oriental Art Department. The aim of the association was to promote American art through a highly visible, cosmopolitan auction venue.

== History ==
The American Art Association (AAA) was founded by James F. Sutton (President of AAA), R. Austin Robertson, and Thomas Kirby (1846–1924) in 1883. Thomas Kirby had grown up in Philadelphia and moved his family to New York in 1876, in the years prior to starting the AAA, he worked at various auction firms and importers in New York. In 1882, Sutton proposed a partnership that would result in the formation of the American Art Association.

During AAA's operation, Sutton, Kirby, Robertson and their staff supervised the sales of hundreds of collections and works of art. R. Austin Robertson traveled to China and Japan to make selections for the Oriental Department. In its first year, AAA exhibited Thomas B. Clarke's collection of American paintings that was a benefit for the National Academy of Design. The AAA held its first auction in 1885.

In 1923, after Kirby retired, Cortlandt F. Bishop (1870–1935), a pioneer aviator and book collector, purchased the American Art Association from Kirby.

In 1929, the Association merged with Anderson Galleries, to form the American Art Association-Anderson Galleries, Inc, and in 1938, the firm was taken over by Parke-Bernet Galleries, Inc., which had been formed a year earlier.

In 1964, Sotheby's purchased Parke-Bernet, then the largest auctioneer of fine art in the United States.

The Archives of American Art, Smithsonian Institution maintains the bulk of the American Art Association records. Additional records are found at the Frick Art Reference Library.

== Publications ==
- American Art Association. 1910. A plan and interesting information concerning the American Art Association and the American Art Galleries, New York. New York City: American Art Association. OCLC 81170983
