= Parke-Bernet =

American art auction house

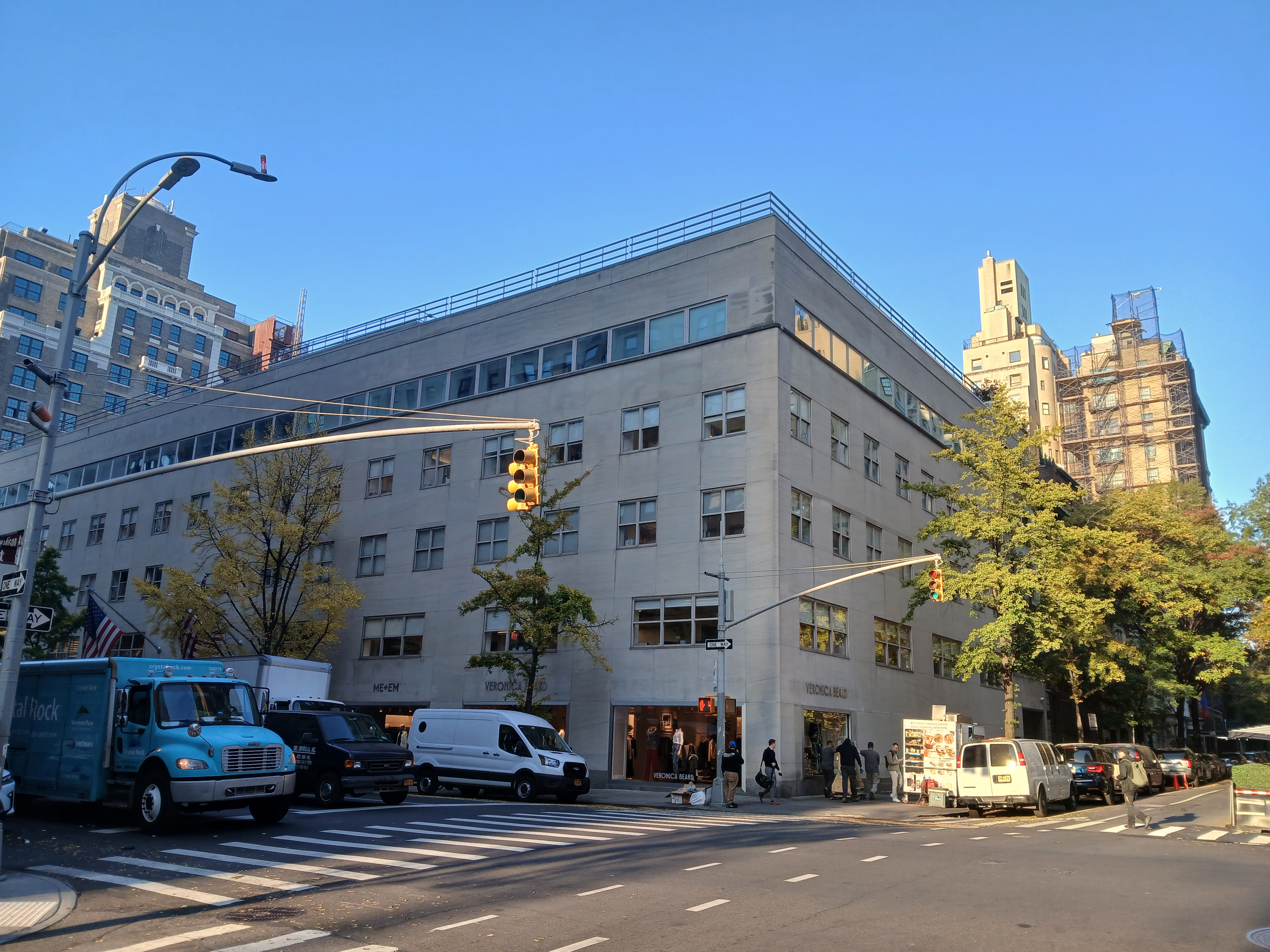
- The Parke-Bernet Galleries building
- Industry: Auctioneering
- Founded: 1937
- Founder: Hiram H. Parke
- Number of employees: 115 (1964)
- Website: parkebernet.com

Parke-Bernet Galleries is an American auction house, founded in 1937, acquired by Sotheby's in 1964, and later reintroduced. The company was founded by a group of employees of the American Art Association, including Otto Bernet, Hiram H. Parke, Leslie A. Hyam, Lewis Marion and Mary Vandergrift. By 1964, the company was the largest auction house in America, with 115 employees and total sales of $11 million ($114 million in 2025). That year, Sotheby's purchased a controlling interest of 75% in the gallery for $1.5 million ($16 million in 2025).

== History ==
The company was founded in 1937, by a group of forty former employees of the American Art Association, including Otto Bernet, Hiram H. Parke, Leslie A. Hyam, Lewis Marion and Mary Vandergrift. In January 1938, the first auction was held in a gallery at 742 Fifth Avenue. The next year, the company took over the American Art Association-Anderson Galleries, consisting of the American Art Association and the Anderson Galleries (formerly Anderson Auction Company). Parke-Bernet oversaw the sale of the estate of Georges Lurcy, a prominent art collector, whose estate included works by Raoul Dufy, Alfred Sisley and Pierre-Auguste Renoir. The collection sold for over 2 million pounds in 1957, a record. Other customers of the company included Rockefellers, Vanderbilts, Paul Mellon and Henry Ford II. Ford's purchase of La Serre by Renoir through Parke-Bernet was a world record. Parke-Bernet also oversaw the sale of the estate of Hagop Kevorkian, the Armenian archaeologist, antiquities dealer, and philanthropist whose foundation gave major contributions to support the study of the Near East and Middle East at the University of Pennsylvania, New York University, and Columbia University.

== Building ==
The Parke-Bernet Galleries building is a building in New York City at 980 Madison Avenue that served as the headquarters of Parke-Bernet Galleries from its opening on November 10, 1949, to its sale in 1987.

== Archives ==
The Department of Image Collections at the National Gallery of Art Library holds over 120,000 photographic negatives documenting sales of artworks from the mid-1930s to 1972, as well as the accompanying auction catalogues. The negatives were primarily created by the firm Taylor & Dull.
