= 980 Madison Avenue =

Building in Manhattan, New York

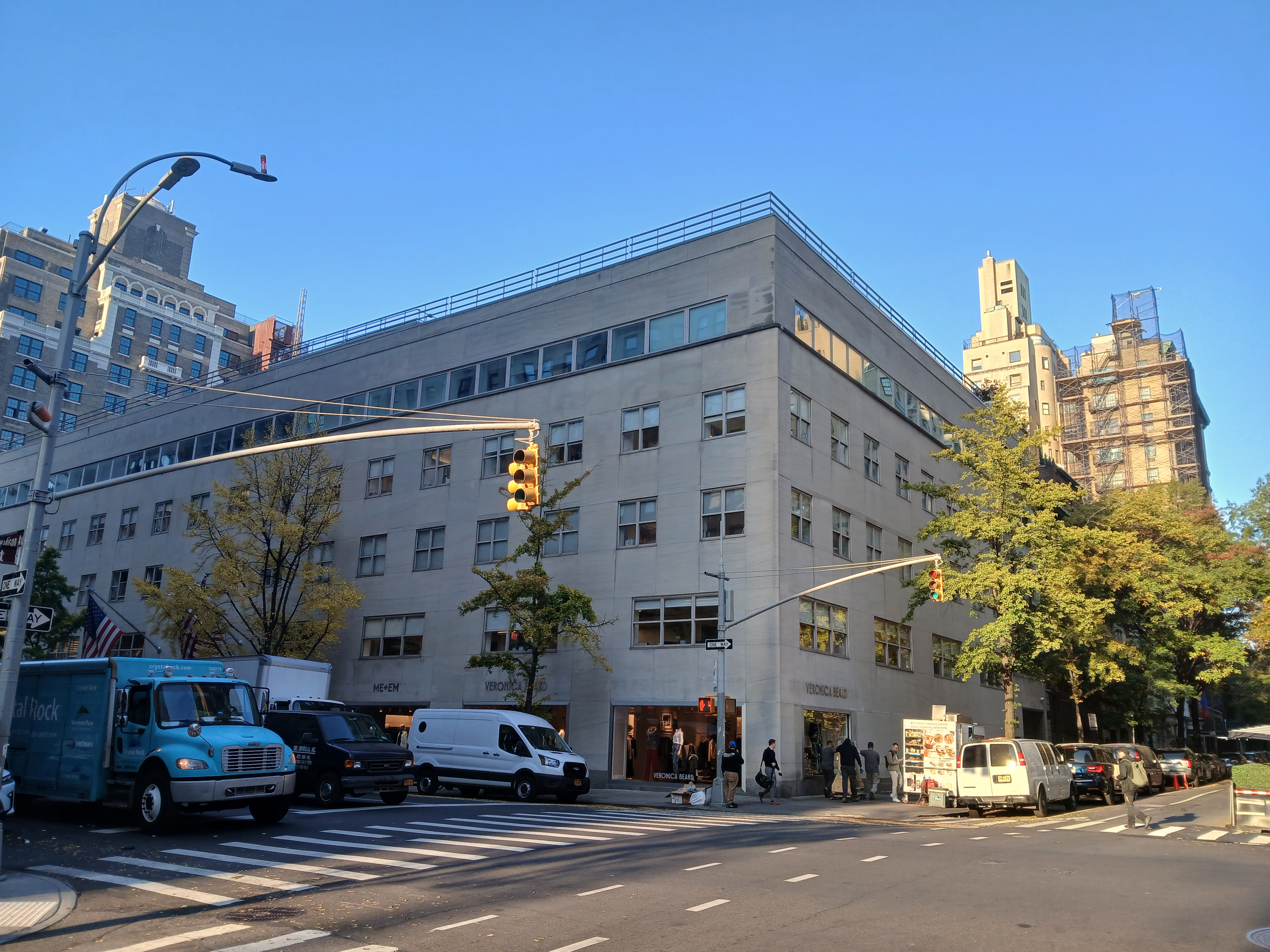
- Interactive map of the 980 Madison Avenue area

General information
- Architectural style: Modern
- Location: 980 Madison Avenue, New York, New York, U.S.
- Coordinates: 40.774798°N 73.963559°W
- Construction started: 1948
- Completed: 1950
- Cost: over $1,000,000

Design and construction
- Architect: Walker & Poor

980 Madison Avenue (also known as the Parke-Bernet Galleries building) is a building located at Madison Avenue and East 76th Street on the Upper East Side of Manhattan in New York City. It served as the headquarters of Parke-Bernet Galleries from its opening on November 10, 1949, to its sale in 1987. In 2006, The New York Times wrote that the building had functioned as "the Grand Central Terminal of the art world." The building is part of the Upper East Side Historic District.

== Design ==
When completed at a cost of over $1,000,000, the building occupied a block, from Seventy-sixth to Seventy-seventh streets on Madison Avenue. It had ten galleries and a larger auditorium, all covered in mohair, that could seat 600 and 2,000 people, respectively. The building had over 45,000 square feet and had a stage modeled upon those on Broadway. The New York Times wrote that the building was "hailed as a new departure in commercial structures." It was designed to be only six stories tall by the architects, A. Stewart Walker and Alfred Easton Poor, to allow light to reach the nearby Carlyle Hotel.

The building has an aluminum sculpture titled "Venus and Manhattan" by Wheeler Williams of Venus. The statue is roughly 16 feet (4.9 m) by 9 feet (2.7 m), and upon its construction was praised by William Adams Delano, Robert W. Dowling, and Francis Keally (the president of the Municipal Art Society). Parts of the statue protruded 18 inches (46 cm) over the building line, and Parke-Bernet agreed to pay $25 per year to 'rent' the space occupied by the statue.

== History ==
=== Parke-Bernet, 1949–1987 ===
Parke-Bernet, an American auction house, had previously been headquartered at 30 East 57th Street. The galleries there which were considered very lavish. The New York Times wrote in 1949 that they were "always looked on as the most luxurious auction rooms in the world." In June 1949, after auctioning the Joseph Brummer art collection, Parke-Bernet ended auctions for the summer as its headquarters were to be torn down and a new building be constructed to hold the galleries. While the building was under construction, the auction house was based in the Brummer Gallery.

The lot at 980 Madison Avenue had previously been occupied by a house owned by Seth Milliken and five rowhouses. Walker & Poor designed the building in a modern style, and it was opened on November 10, 1949. The opening ceremony had around 2,500 attendees and speakers included Hiram H. Parke, Robert W. Dowling and Leslie A. Hyam. The move led to the development of an art market on upper Madison Avenue. In March 1966 Peregrine Pollen, then president of Sotheby Parke Bernet, used the building for a concert by pianist Philippe Entremont. In 1967, a brownstone neighboring the galleries caught fire, and 200 people were evacuated from the building. None of the exhibits were damaged.

On June 9, 1987, Sotheby Parke-Bernet announced that it was closing the galleries, causing an uproar in the New York City art community. Klaus Perls, a German art dealer, said ''I am shattered by the news. I thought that Sotheby's was the greatest asset to the art market in New York that could be imagined. I think a lot of the glamour that has characterized the art market in New York over the last 20 years is going to disappear when Sotheby's leaves the premises.'' Parke-Bernet relocated to its York Avenue galleries. The building was then divided into small rooms for tenants and included in the Upper East Side Historic District.

=== Gagosian, 1987–present ===
Also in 1987, Larry Gagosian leased a small office there, gradually growing into it a multi-floor operation that eventually spanned nearly half the entire building. The gallery's first show there, “Jasper Johns: The Maps,” opened in February 1989.

In the 2000 A.I.A. Guide to New York City the building was described as "an insipid box unrelated to any cultural values."

In 2006, Aby Rosen offered to restore the building to its original appearance, but made the offer contingent upon being able to construct a 30-story glass tower on top of the galleries. The tower was designed by Norman Foster and supported by prominent figures such as Jeff Koons, Tory Burch, and Ronald Perelman. However, many in New York disliked the proposed design. After Manhattan Community Board 7 voted against the proposal in October 2006, the New York City Landmarks Commission also reviewed the proposal and rejected it in January 2007. Rosen and Foster then proposed a new, six story addition in May 2008, and in November 2009 a smaller, five story addition was accepted. The proposal had not been started in 2013 and Aby Rosen put the property on the market.

In 2019 Ramy Brook, a fashion house, opened a flagship store at the location. Rosen's company, RFR Holding, obtained a $238 million commercial mortgage-backed security loan for the building in 2021. At the time, Rosen was spending money to renovate the building and attract art-related tenants. Two women's clothing stores leased space at 980 Madison Avenue in early 2023. RFR proposed leasing 85 percent of the building's space to Bloomberg Philanthropies in October 2023, displacing Gagosian from the site.
