= Cable television by region =

The distribution of cable television around the world:

== Asia ==
=== Mainland China ===
Cable television is the most common transmission method in all urban areas of mainland China – television aerials are an extremely rare sight. Cable systems in China usually carry all the CCTV channels in Mandarin, along with all the channels of municipal, provincial or regional networks in question. The remaining slots carry the main channels from several other province-level stations, and may carry additional channels from metropolitan stations such as BTV and Shanghai Media Group. They may also carry a local channel for a particular sub-provincial municipality, prefecture or county. Individual compounds (hotels, housing estates, etc.) often add a request channel showing karaoke music videos and animations. An extremely small number of compounds with many foreign residents and/or tourists (for example, five-star hotels in Beijing) will also carry selected channels from Hong Kong, Taiwan and the Western world. Phoenix Television has the widest carriage under this rule.

Guangdong Province is the only area where channels from Hong Kong can be carried legally. Currently, TVB Jade and TVB Pearl are the only terrestrial channels which are carried by the Guangdong Cable Network. Phoenix Television is also available. In Shenzhen, select foreign channels such as CNN International or HBO are also available at a fee.

Mainland China had more than 44.5 million digital cable television users in 2008.

Unlike many cable television operators in other countries that support two-way modes, China's cable television systems operate in a one-way mode (download only, no upload).

=== Hong Kong ===
Cable television was introduced to Hong Kong in 1957 when Rediffusion Television (predecessor to Asia Television) began transmissions as Hong Kong's first television station. This arrangement ended in 1973 when Rediffusion Television was granted a free-to-air terrestrial broadcast licence by the Hong Kong government. Cable television returned to Hong Kong in 1993 when Wharf Cable Television (now known as Cable TV Hong Kong) began operations as Hong Kong's first subscription-based multichannel television platform. Cable TV Hong Kong currently competes with the IPTV platforms HKBN bbTV and now TV as well as the pay television service TVB Network Vision.

=== Japan ===
Cable television was introduced to Japan in 1955, in Shibukawa, Gunma Prefecture. Until the 1980s, cable television in Japan was mainly limited to rural mountainous areas and outlying islands where the reception of terrestrial television was poor. Cable television started to proliferate in urban areas in the late 1980s, beginning with Tokyo, whose first cable television station began broadcasting in 1987. In the mid-1990s, two-way multichannel cable television platforms first appeared in the market; broadband internet services started being bundled to cable television subscriptions in the late 1990s.

Currently, there are several national and regional cable television providers in Japan, the largest being J:COM, followed by Japan Cablenet (JCN). These companies currently compete with the Japanese satellite television platforms SKY PerfecTV! and WOWOW, as well as the IPTV platform Hikari TV operated by NTT Plala.

Japan Cable Television Engineering Association (JCTEA) is the umbrella organisation representing 600 member companies involved in research, designing, manufacturing, installation and maintenance of cable television facilities in Japan.

Analog broadcasting on cable television ceased in most areas between July 24, 2011, and March 31, 2015; the transition was completed on April 30, 2015.

=== Malaysia ===
Cable television was introduced to Malaysia in 1995 when Mega TV was launched as the country's first subscription-based pay television service. Mega TV ceased operations in 2001, due to stiff competition from the Malaysian satellite television operator Astro as well as a failure to expand its range of channels. In 2013, ABNXcess was launched as Malaysia's second cable television service and marked the return of cable television to Malaysia after a 12-year absence.

=== Maldives ===
There are only two cable television providers in the Maldives (MediaNet Digital and SatLink Digital). As the population of the country is separated across around 200 inhabited islands, there is a cable provider for nearly every island. MediaNet, based in Malé, is the country's largest cable TV provider that provides digital cable (DVB-C) and Multichannel Multipoint Distribution Service (MMDS) services to most of the Islands in the Maldives. MediaNet holds a distribution license for 100 TV channels and distributes TV channels to nearly all the TV operators of the country. In Maldives, cable television subscribers can get most basic and premium TV channels available in Asia.

=== Mongolia ===
There are several cable television providers in Mongolia. The main three are SuperVision, Hiimori and Sansar CATV. All three cover approximately 15 national channels and 40 foreign channels, such as CNN, the BBC and NHK. Sansar has the largest network in Ulaanbaatar. SuperVision is the first digital cable television service in Mongolia and other CATVs are planning to launch digital cable television with CA systems.

=== Philippines ===
NUVUE, the first cable television system in the Philippines, was set up in Baguio by American expatriate Russel Swartley in 1969. Cable television became popular in the 1980s after the Marcos administration. Sky Cable, the largest cable television provider in the Philippines, began operations in 1992. Cable providers have proliferated since then, including Destiny Cable, Cablelink and some regional cable providers. In 2007, Sky Cable introduced the DigiBox, a set-top box that provides a digital television (DTV) signal for higher video quality and prevents illegal cable connections. In 2008, Sky Cable also broadcast the 37th Ryder Cup in high-definition television (HDTV). In 2009, Sky Cable became the first cable television service provider in the Philippines to broadcast the UAAP Games in high definition via the new SkyHD Cable TV service.

=== Singapore ===
Cable television was introduced to Singapore in 1991 when Singapore Cable Vision (now known as StarHub TV) was licensed to develop and establish a cable-based subscription television network in Singapore. The project was completed in stages between 1995 and 1999 and upon achieving 100% cable television coverage in 1999, SCV was granted exclusivity in the provision of pay television services in Singapore for three years until 2002. That same year, StarHub, a Singapore telecommunications company, acquired SCV and the cable television network was subsequently renamed as StarHub Cable Vision, and again as StarHub TV in 2007. Digital cable was introduced to Singapore in November 2004 and completely replaced the previous analogue cable service by June 2009. As the private ownership of satellite dishes is banned in Singapore, StarHub TV and its IPTV counterpart mio TV (launched in 2007) comprise the only multichannel television platforms available in Singapore as of October 2013. StarHub has announced its intention to close down its cable TV operation in June 2019 and migrate all customer to IPTV. The market has been steadily losing Pay TV customers, predominantly to Internet Streaming Devices, many of which are illegal; as of 2018, the government has issued directions to ISPs to block access to "TV Box Apps".

=== South Korea ===
Cable television was legalised by the South Korean government in 1993, and was formally introduced in 1995 with an initial 20 operators covering various regions of South Korea. As of 2014, there are 149 cable television operators in South Korea, mainly operating at a regional level. These companies compete with the South Korean satellite television platform SkyLife as well as the IPTV platforms HanaTV, U+ TV and Olleh TV.

=== Taiwan ===
Cable television is prevalent in Taiwan, as a result of cheap subscription rates (typically around NT$550, or US$15 a month) and the paucity of free-to-air television, which comprises five channels. Programming is mostly in Mandarin and Taiwanese, with some English, Japanese and other foreign-language channels. Miniseries, called Taiwanese drama, are popular. There is a dedicated station for Taiwan's Hakka minority as well as the arrival in 2005 of an aboriginal channel. Almost all programmes are in their original language with traditional Chinese subtitles.

Cable television in Taiwan is claimed by the industry to have begun in 1969 in the Taipei suburb of Shipai, and CATV antennas were subsequently set up in Taiwan's mountainous areas to remedy poor terrestrial reception in those areas. In the 1970s, illegal cable television systems nicknamed "fourth channels" to differentiate it from the then-three legal Taiwanese terrestrial channels were set up in every location in Taiwan. These illegal cable television systems, while technically considered to have operated outside the boundaries of Taiwanese law because there was no provision for cable television in the Taiwanese Broadcasting Act at that time were, however, popular with the Taiwanese public as they offered more choices in programming compared to those offered by terrestrial television. Fourth channels initially obtained much of their programming from VCR videotapes, which were then played and retransmitted via coaxial cables to connected households with a subscription, and subsequently enjoyed massive growth after the late 1980s when the legalisation of Ku band satellite receptions in 1988 and private installations of C band satellite dishes in 1992 substantially increased the range of available channels. Fourth channels were also popular among Taiwan's then-nascent opposition political parties, who used this medium to communicate pro-democracy views.

Despite the Taiwanese government's unsuccessful attempts in cracking down on the fourth channels, including a major raid in which 370,000 kg (820,000 lb) of coaxial cables were forcibly removed and destroyed over a four-month period in 1991, the straw that broke the camel's back only occurred when the United States began threatening trade sanctions against Taiwan in retaliation for massive copyright infringement committed by the fourth channels, in part due to the fourth channels' illegal retransmission of satellite signals from domestic and foreign sources, especially those from Hong Kong, Japan and the United States which became possible only when satellite receptions became legal as explained above.

Faced with this problem, the Taiwanese government eventually legalized cable television in July 1993 when the Government Information Office ratified the Cable Television Act. In October 1994, 209 companies took part in a series of competitive tenders which were called as a result of the implementation of the said Cable Television Act. On May 13, 1998, Keelung Cable Television (吉隆有線電視) became the first Taiwanese cable television operator to obtain a broadcasting license which covers the city of Keelung in northern Taiwan. By 2001, there were 66 cable television operators in Taiwan, mainly operating at a regional level. These companies compete with the Taiwanese satellite television platform DishHD as well as the IPTV platform CHT MOD operated by Chunghwa Telecom.

The Taiwanese government is pushing for a switch to digital cable television services by 2015; this will be provided through a set-top box and will increase the number of available channels.

=== Turkey ===
Cable television was introduced to Turkey in the early 1980s when several cable companies started operations such as Sky, Amunarie, ODus and Mediafield.

== Europe ==
=== Denmark ===
Cable television was introduced to Denmark in 1963 when Jysk Telefon, a Danish telecommunications company, started cable television services on the Jutland peninsula. However, it was not until 1985 that cable television became the preferred method of receiving television in Denmark, when the then-four regional telecommunications operators in Denmark began a considerable expansion of the Danish cable television network. In 1990, the four regional telecommunications operators were merged into a single entity called Tele Danmark (now known as TDC A/S) and in 1995 Denmark's first nationwide cable television company called Tele Danmark Kabel TV (now YouSee) was formed. As of 2011, 93% of Danish households subscribed to cable television, the highest rate in the world. The cable television market in Denmark is dominated by three operators, namely YouSee, Stofa and Dansk Bredbånd respectively.

=== Finland ===
Finland has a cable television infrastructure, which is also used for cable internet.

=== France ===
In France, it was not until the 1980s that cable networks were developed on a national scale. A public-private semi-public scheme was set up to allow private operators to commercially exploit the networks set up by the French Telecommunications Directorate, which later became France Télécom.

In 1986, Lyonnaise des Eaux, which became part of the Suez group in 1997, created a subsidiary dedicated to its cable activities: Lyonnaise Communications. In May 2000, "Noos" became the brand name of Lyonnaise Communications. At that time, there were still three main national cable operators: France Télécom Cable, Numericable and Noos. But the services offered by cable were beginning to be broken down into different offerings in addition to television: Internet access, VOD and, later, telephony.

In April 2005, Suez withdrew from Noos (Lyonnaise Communications) and sold 100% of its shares to United Global Communication, which merged with its US parent company to become Liberty Global in June 2005. Noos is now owned by UPC France, a subsidiary of Liberty Global.

In June 2006, the Altice group and the British investment fund Cinven acquired UPC France, a few months after the acquisition of Numericable. From then on, the France Télécom Câble, TDF Câble and Numericable brands were merged. Prior to this merger, Numericable was considered France's second largest cable operator in terms of the number of sockets connected. The Numericable group is itself the result of the previous merger of France Télécom Câble and NC Numericable in 2005, following the acquisition of NC Numericable by Altice from its parent company, the Canal+ Group.

In October 2006, UPC-Noos and Numericable began communicating under the unified ‘Numericable Noos’ brand.

In 2009, the operator that owns most of the local cable networks, Numericable, which is owned by Patrick Drahi via the Altice group, was hit hard by the expected proliferation of free DTT, satellite and, above all, IPTV channels.

In March 2014, Numericable and its parent company Altice made a proposal to acquire the French telecommunications operator SFR, which is owned by Vivendi, along with Bouygues Telecom. Vivendi decided to enter into exclusive negotiations with Numericable on 14 March 2014. On 5 April 2014, Altice was chosen by Vivendi to sell SFR. In April 2014, Patrick Drahi, the head of Altice Europe (Numericable's parent company), announced that the new Numericable-SFR group would adopt the SFR brand.

=== Ireland ===
Cable television is the most common system for distributing multi-channel television in Ireland. With more than 40 years of history and extensive networks of both wired and "wireless" cable, Ireland is amongst the most cabled countries in Europe. Forty percent of Irish homes received cable television in September 2006. The figure dropped slightly in the early years of the 21st century due to the increased popularity of satellite reception, notably Sky, but has stabilized recently.

In the Republic of Ireland, UPC Ireland is by far the largest cable and MMDS operator, owning all of the state's MMDS licenses and almost all of the state's cable television providers. UPC offers analogue and digital cable television services in cities and towns throughout the country (with the exception of Cork, where the network is digital-only). It offers MMDS services in rural areas. In areas previously served by NTL, the network is digital-only, while Chorus areas still have both analogue and digital services. Other than UPC, the only other operator providing analogue and digital cable is Casey Cablevision, which operates in Dungarvan, County Waterford. There also exists a small number of analogue-only cable networks such as the Longford service Crossan Cable.

=== Italy ===
In the 1950s and 1960s, the Italian state broadcaster RAI was the only one authorized to broadcast television programming in Italy, hence making RAI a monopolist. That monopoly status was broken in 1971, when Giuseppe Sacchi, a former RAI editor, launched on April 21 that year the first "free" television station in Italy, called Telebiella and based in Biella, which was only possible through a legal loophole in Italian broadcasting law which did not specifically prohibit the existence of cable television. Telebiella and later of such stations provided Italy's first cable television services free from the influence of the Italian state. However, these early cable television channels, which operated as pirate broadcasters in a sense were soon heavily stifled by the Italian government and most were forced to shut down. Later, the Italian government introduced laws to regulate and allow for cable television, albeit with heavy restrictions: only one cable system for every city and only one television channel for each system.

Only in the 1990s was a nationwide cable television system developed, first by Telecom Italia and later by FASTWEB. In 2001 TV di Fastweb became the first commercial cable television platform in Italy, however, after just over a decade in operation TV di Fastweb shut down in November 2012 due to competition from other similar services such as Sky Italia and Mediaset Premium as well as internet video-on-demand services such as Netflix. To date, no cable television platform exists in Italy.

=== Netherlands ===
In the Netherlands, cable television is the most widely used television distribution system. As of 2012, about 5.3 million households (about 70%) had a cable television subscription. This number is slowly dropping since the rise of cheaper alternatives such as IPTV. The basic subscription of all major providers costs between €15 and €20 and includes analog and digital television and radio.

The cable infrastructure is owned by the television providers. This means that depending on where you live, there is only one available provider. As of 2015, the only major provider is Ziggo. Lately, there have been efforts to 'open up' these monopolies and force the providers to allow other providers on their networks, but this has not been successful so far.

=== Norway ===
Cable television in Norway began in the mid-1970's when some neighbourhoods, primarily in the greater Oslo and Trondheim areas, attempted to reduce clutters of reception antennas in urban areas while at the same time receiving the Swedish channels SVT1 and SVT2 and getting better signals for NRK1.

Starting in the 1980s, additional channels were added including, but not limited to, Sky Television, TV3, MTV, CNN, TV5 Monde, Eurosport and Europa TV, and cable television became available in larger parts of the country. The airings of He-Man and the Masters of the Universe on Sky Television was considered a national sensation. Later into the 1980s and into the early 1990s, further channels were added including TV2, TVNorge, NRK2, TV4 (Sweden), BBC TV Europe, Cartoon Network and Fox Kids.

Most cable-receiving households relied on analogue cable signals into the 2000s, which could carry between 15 and 22 TV channels, whereas digital satellite signals had relied on set-top box receivers for more than a decade by then. Although set-top boxes to receive more cable channels were available, the added monthly costs for the main extended packages made such boxes rarely used, until the late 2000s and early 2010s when set-top boxes were given for free to cable TV subscribers and the extended main packages were included at no extra cost.

As of 2024, cable television has a large supermajority of the market share in cities and towns (though does not have 100% coverage in those areas), while villages and rural areas rely mostly on satellite television, digital terrestrial television and increasingly streaming services. As of August 2024, the largest cable providers are Telenor and Telia Norge, both of which also offer IPTV signals with identical channel availabilities.

=== Portugal ===
Cable television was introduced to Portugal in 1992 when TV Cabo Madeirense began operations on the island of Madeira. Cable television was extended to mainland Portugal in 1994 under the name TVCabo (now NOS). In 1995, Cabovisão began operations in the cities of Palmela and Setúbal. In the late 1990s, TVTEL, PluriCanal and Bragatel also began to offer cable television services.

In 2005, NOS became the first Portuguese cable television provider to adopt digital cable. The Autoridade Nacional de Comunicações (ANACOM) has requested all Portuguese cable television providers to switch over to digital cable as soon as possible. Because TVTEL, PluriCanal and Bragatel decided not to renew their licenses after the said announcement, NOS has decided to acquire them and all their customers have been transitioned to the NOS cable service, making NOS the largest cable television provider in Portugal. In the 21st century, 3 cable TV provider solidified its position as the biggest and better provider. They are NOS, ZON and VODAFONE. At the same time, they are also Mobile GSM, Internet and landline phone providers. All 3 companies provide the last technology available worldwide and with similar prices, although above European average.

=== Romania ===
Cable television in Romania was introduced in 1991, although some small cable networks were established before 1990, usually amateur made equipment, serving small communities, and receiving about 8-12 foreign channels, but with no translation, and usually at low quality, however, like in other East European countries before 1989, most people were having monochrome sets, therefore, low quality was not very important. After 1990, cable networks were expanding and penetrating the market, new or second-hand cable equipment were achieved by providers. Channels like Cartoon Network, Euronews, Discovery Channel, MTV and many other channels like Italian, German or French channels were of high interest, many people subscribed fairly cheap to cable television. This expansion and penetration continues to the present day. Cable television in Romania has a high penetration, over 75% of households being subscribed to a cable television supplier, and lately, all cable television operators are providing internet access and telephony. RCS&RDS, and UPC Romania are the largest providers, and are present in most areas of Romania, but there are also many other smaller cable providers, which are operating locally regionally and are serving some local communities, cities, districts or some counties, and are also offering internet access. In fact, internet access in Romania is mainly granted (for home use, but even for business use) by cable TV operators. Cable television is mainly analogue, and is offered by all cable television providers in Romania, providing between 40 and 70 channels (depending on the cable supplier and the number of local and regional channels), but lately, digital cable is becoming very popular, providing up to 160 channels (depending on the supplier and the number of regional and local channels). Some small providers are offering solely analogue cable television, although some of them are beginning to provide digital channels, and they modernized and improved their networks, for providing internet access with higher speeds and more digital programs. Analogue cable Television, still has a high demand, as there are still subscribers which have older CRT TV sets or Plasma and LCD sets with no digital built-in tuner, and some of them are not interested in digital cable television, or willing to replace the TV very soon. Most must-carry channels are also available in Romania on analogue cable, also along with some foreign channels (like Viasat, Discovery, National Geographic, Paramount, etc.). Therefore, analogue cable television will continue to be provided for an undetermined period of time. However, unencrypted channels are available (depending on provider) if subscribing to an analogue service. Cable television in Romania is fairly cheap.

=== Russia ===
Cable television was introduced in the 2000s, and grew significantly in the early 2010s. Cable operators began upgrading their networks to DVB-C and adding new services such as video on demand, catch-up-TV and others. In 2012, cable television accounted for more than half of all pay-TV subscribers (58%).

=== Serbia ===
First cable TV system in nowadays Serbia (which was then part of Yugoslavia) was installed in Sombor in the late 1980s. There were few foreign channels like MTV, SKY News, Super channel, etc. Later in the 1990s Serbian post service began providing cable TV service in Belgrade and Novi Sad. Today almost every town in Serbia have cable TV service, this type of TV is very popular in urban areas, especially because of the cable Internet, which is provided together with TV through cable system. In rural areas IPTV and satellite pay-TV services are more popular than cable TV.

=== Spain ===
In 1972, the Dirección General de Radiodifusión y Televisión (now part of RTVE) started collaborating with the Spanish telecommunications provider Telefónica in implementing cable television in Spain, first in the cities of Madrid and Barcelona and eventually in other Spanish cities. The initial cable television system implemented in Madrid and Barcelona covered a total area of 8 km^{2} (with future provision for extending coverage area to 32 km^{2}), and allowed a total of nine channels to be received. The project was deemed complete by 1976, although due to the political situation in Spain at that time the first cable television networks in Spain only came into existence in the early 1980s. These early Spanish cable television networks mainly operated at a regional level, whereas each cable operator served a defined area.

As more cable operators sprung up in Spain in the intervening years and without a national policy to coordinate cable television, the Spanish government eventually ratified the Spanish General Telecommunications by Cable Act 42/95 in 1995 and established a legal framework over which all Spanish cable television providers would be regulated. In 2003, the Spanish General Telecommunications Act 32/2003 was implemented and repealed many of the provisions of the previous Cable Act 42/95, while establishing a new regulatory framework for cable television, public radio, information technology services, etc.

Currently, the largest cable television provider in Spain is Vodafone, which operates in several regions and autonomous communities of Spain. Other well-known Spanish cable television providers include Euskaltel, which mainly operates in the Basque Country; Telecable, which operates in northern Spain; and R, which operates in Galicia in northwestern Spain. All major cable television operators and many smaller ones offer triple play and quadruple play services.

=== Sweden ===
Cable television was introduced to Sweden in 1961 when Informations-TV AB started a cable television service in the city of Malmö that same year, which mainly transmitted locally produced programming and from 1981 retransmitted satellite broadcasts beginning with the Soviet television channel Horizont. In the 1970s and 1980s a few cable television networks sprung up in different Swedish cities, sometimes operating on an experimental basis.

In 1983 the then-telecommunications monopoly Televerket launched Sweden's first nationwide cable television network called Televerket Kabel-TV (now known as Com Hem). On January 1, 1986, the Swedish government ratified the Swedish Local Cable Broadcasting Act (SFS 1985:677), which formally legalised cable television in Sweden. Currently the largest cable television provider in Sweden is the aforementioned Com Hem with a 75% market share. Other Swedish cable television providers include Tele2Vision, Canal Digital and Sappa.

=== United Kingdom ===
When the infant BBC Television service was started in 1936, Rediffusion, which had supplied cable radio services since 1928, started providing "Pipe TV" to its customers who had difficulties tuning into the weak television broadcast signal.

Suspended during World War II, the BBC service was re-established in June 1946, and had only one transmitter, at Alexandra Palace, which served the London area. From the end of 1949, new transmitters were steadily opened to serve other major conurbations, and then smaller areas of population. The areas on the fringes of the transmitter coverage provided an opportunity for Rediffusion and other commercial companies to expand cable systems to enlarge the viewing audience for the one BBC television channel which then existed. The first was in Gloucester in 1950 and the process gathered pace over the next few years, especially after a second television channel, ITV, was launched in 1955 to compete with BBC. By the late 1970s, 2.5 million British homes received their television service via cable.

By law, these cable systems were restricted to the relay of the public broadcast channels, which meant that as the transmitter network became more comprehensive, the incentive to subscribe to cable was reduced and they began to lose customers. In 1982, a radical liberalization of the law on cable was proposed by the Information Technology Advisory Panel, for the sake of promoting a new generation of broadband cable systems leading to the wired society. After setting up and receiving the conclusions of the Hunt Inquiry into Cable Expansion and Broadcasting Policy, the Government decided to proceed with liberalization and two pieces of legislation: the Cable and Broadcasting Act and the Telecommunications Act, were enacted in 1984.

The result was that cable systems were permitted to carry as many new television channels as they liked, as well as providing a telephone service and interactive services of many kinds (as since made familiar by the Internet). To maintain the momentum of the perceived commercial interest in this new investment opportunity, in 1983, the Government itself granted eleven interim franchises for new broadband systems each covering a community of up to around 100,000 homes, but the competitive franchising process was otherwise left to the new regulatory body, the Cable Authority, which took on its powers from January 1, 1985.

The franchising process proceeded steadily, but the actual construction of new systems was slow, as doubts about an adequate payback from the substantial investment persisted. By the end of 1990 almost 15 million homes had been included in franchised areas, but only 828,000 of these had been passed by broadband cable and only 149,000 were actually subscribing. Thereafter, however, construction accelerated and take-up steadily improved.

The first new television channels launched for carriage on cable systems (debuting in March 1984) were Sky Channel, Screensport, Music Box and Premiere. Others followed, some were merged or closed down, but the range expanded. A similar flux was seen among the operators of cable systems: franchises were granted to a host of different companies, but a process of consolidation saw the growth of large multiple system operators until, by the early 2000s, virtually the whole industry was in the hands of two companies, NTL and Telewest.

In October 2005, it was announced that NTL and Telewest would merge, after a period of co-operation in the preceding few years. This merger was completed on March 3, 2006, with the company being named ntl Incorporated. Initially, the two brand names and services were marketed separately. However, following NTL's acquisition of Virgin Mobile, the NTL and Telewest services were rebranded as Virgin Media on February 8, 2007, creating a single cable operator covering more than 95% of the UK cable market.

There are a small number of other surviving cable television companies in the UK other than Virgin Media including WightFibre (Isle of Wight).

Cable television faces intense competition from Sky's satellite television service. Most channels are carried on both platforms. However, cable often lacks "interactive" features (e.g. text services, and extra video-screens), especially on BSkyB-owned channels, and the satellite platform lacks services requiring high degrees of two-way communication, such as true video on demand.

However, subscription-funded digital terrestrial television (DTT) proved less of a competitive threat. The first system, ITV Digital, went into liquidation in 2002. Also, Top Up TV which was launched in 2004 closed on November 1, 2013, because of low take-up, a dwindling offering, and competition from services such as Lovefilm and Netflix.

A new source of competition was television transmitted over broadband internet connections; this is known as Internet Protocol television (IPTV). As the speed and availability of broadband connections increased, more television content could be delivered using protocols such as IPTV. Uptake of this new form of television was initially restricted by consumer attitudes toward watching television programs on personal computers instead of television sets. Over time technologies such as IPTV streaming devices were developed and IPTV applications began to be integrated directly into new televisions. At the end of 2006, BT (the UK's former state-owned monopoly phone company) started offering BT TV, which combined the digital free-to-air standard Freeview through an aerial, and on-demand IPTV, delivered over a BT Broadband connection through the television set-top box (utilising the Mediaroom platform).

== North America ==
=== Canada ===
In 1949, Broadcast Relay Service began negotiations for the implementation of what was to be the first large scale cable television system in North America. The development of the system relied on reaching agreement with Quebec Hydro-Electric Commission to utilise their existing network of power poles supplying power to the Greater Montreal area. Initial discussions began with a meeting with Montreal City Council on June 21, 1949. After many months of negotiation, an agreement was reached between Hydro-Québec and Rediffusion on February 28, 1950, for an initial five-year period. The Rediffusion cable system was operational in 1952 and eventually supplied 80,000 homes in Montreal, Quebec. Cable television in Canada began in 1952 with community antenna connections in Vancouver and London, Ontario; which city was the first is not clear. Initially, the systems brought American television stations to viewers in Canada who had no Canadian stations to watch; broadcast television, though begun late in 1952 in Toronto and Montreal, did not reach a majority of cities until 1954.

In time, cable television was widely established to carry available Canadian stations as well as import American stations, which constituted the vast majority of signals on systems (usually only one or two Canadian stations, while some systems had duplicate or even triplicate coverage of American networks). During the 1970s, a growing number of Canadian stations pushed American channels off the systems, forcing several to expand beyond the original 12-channel system configurations. At the same time, the advent of fiber-optic technology enabled companies to extend their systems to nearby towns and villages that by themselves were not viable cable television markets.

=== Dominican Republic ===
Cable television in the Dominican Republic is provided by a variety of companies. These companies offer both English- and Spanish-language television, plus a range of channels in other languages, high definition channels, pay-per-view movies and events, sports packages and premium movie channels such as HBO, Playboy TV and Cinecanal. Also, the channels are from not only the Dominican Republic, but also the United States and Europe. In the Dominican Republic television spectrum, there are 46 VHF, UHF, and free-to-air (FTA) channels. The free-of-charge channels programming consists mainly of locally produced entertainment shows, news, and comedy shows; and foreign sitcoms, soap operas, movies, cartoons and sports programs.

The main service provider in the Dominican Republic is Telecable from Tricom. Aster is concentrated in Santo Domingo, but is expanding its service throughout the Dominican Republic. There are also new companies using new technologies that are expanding quickly such as Claro TV (IPTV), Wind Telecom (MMDS) and SKY (satellite television).

=== Panama ===
Panamanian company REXSA (RECREACIONES Y EXHIBICIONES, S.A.) introduced cable television in Panama City in 1981. In other regions, there were also local cable companies. REXSA's successor, Cable Onda 90, known later as Cable Onda, was dominant throughout the 1990s, and expanded to Chiriqui Province. Since 2000, the largest Panamanian cable television companies have been Cable Onda (40% share), Cable and Wireless (started in late 2009) and CTV.

=== St. Pierre and Miquelon ===
In the French territory of Saint Pierre and Miquelon, near Newfoundland, Canada, cable television is offered by a single operator, SPM Telecom, a subsidiary of the French multinational operator Orange. The company offers French-language television channels from mainland France, as well as French-language television channels from Canada, especially from the province of Quebec. It also offers English-language channels in its TV package, including US channels such as ABC and Fox.

=== United States ===
Cable television in the United States is a common form of television delivery, generally by subscription. Cable television first became available in the United States in 1948. Data by SNL Kagan shows that as of 2006 about 58.4% of all U.S. homes subscribe to basic cable television services. Most cable viewers in the U.S. are in the suburbs and tend to be middle class; cable television is less common in low income, inner city, and rural areas.

Cable television franchise fees stem from a community's basic right to charge for use of the property it owns. The cable television franchise fees represent part of the compensation a community receives in exchange for the cable operator's occupation and the right-of-way use of public property. A franchise fee is not a tax; it is a rental charge.

== Oceania ==
=== Australia ===
Cable television began in the early 1990s in Australia. Several companies appeared including Foxtel, Galaxy TV, Optus TV, SelecTV and Austar offering services to homes across the major states of Australia. Services to Tasmania and the Northern Territory took longer to start, not until the mid-2000s when the digital satellite pay television service had picked up momentum and was beginning to be used for metropolitan installs and not just rural installs.

Foxtel dominates the cable television landscape and was originally rebroadcast by Austar (in rural areas) and Optus TV, until both latter companies respectively ceased operations in 2014 and 2011. Galaxy TV and SelecTV likewise no longer operate. The effective Foxtel monopoly has drawn criticism within Australia for being anti-competitive and inflating prices.

=== New Zealand ===
Vodafone New Zealand operated a hybrid cable/IPTV pay television network formerly owned by TelstraClear (until its acquisition by Vodafone in 2012) under the brand "InHomeTV". It was delivered over both UFB cable and UFB fiber, and was available in Wellington, Christchurch and Kapati Coast. InHomeTV competed with the New Zealand satellite television operator SKY TV (unrelated to its UK namesake). In 2019, Vodafone ceased expanding or promoting the HFC system, choosing to focus on Fiber, though the current service was maintained. InHomeTV was replaced by VodafoneTV, this was a standard IP streaming service available to anyone in NZ with a broadband internet connection. Content was sourced from FreeToAir suppliers and SkyTV on a subscription basis.

In September 2010, TelstraClear released their own PVR called the T-BOX. The launch followed the release by its then-parent company Telstra of a similar product. In June 2011, TelstraClear ceased all analogue cable services, converting exclusively to digital.

In late 2021, Vodafone announced that the cable TV service would be closed down within the next 12 months. It was finally closed in September 2022, replaced by a streaming service provided by Sky. Today the cable network is used for delivery of internet service only.

== South America ==
=== Argentina ===
Cable television was first introduced to Argentina in 1965, in the city of Junín. In the 1990s, cable television became very popular in Argentina and by 1996, 53% of Argentinian homes had access to cable television. The rapid growth of cable television in Argentina continued throughout the 2000s and currently 83% of Argentinian households subscribe to cable television, the fourth-highest rate in the world, surpassed only by Canada, the United States and Denmark.

=== Brazil ===
Cable television was first introduced in 1990 in the city of São Paulo and then has expanded, being available in most state capitals and in most neighbourhoods of medium and large cities. The cable network is often used to provide internet access at speeds up to 120 Mbit/s.

It is estimated that there are about 7.5 million subscribers, the largest operator being NET followed by smaller operators; however, it is less popular than direct-broadcast satellite due to the difficulty and expense of expanding the cable network.

A major problem is cable television piracy, with an unknown number of users using the service illegally.

=== Colombia ===
Cable television was introduced in 1992 in the city of Santa Marta.

=== Chile ===
Cable television was first demonstrated in Chile in the early 1960s, and was formally introduced in 1986 in the commune of Providencia in Santiago Province. The first cable television operator in Chile was Intercom, owned by the newspaper company El Mercurio, and featured four in-house produced channels. In the 1990s, cable television became very popular in Chile and more cable operators sprung up in those years to provide cable television in Chile. Currently, there are many cable television providers in Chile, the largest being VTR, followed by Claro Americas.

=== Paraguay ===
Cable television was introduced to Paraguay in 1989, in the city of Asunción, and then has expanded in the 1990s in Gran Asunción and rest of country.

=== Peru ===
Cable television was introduced to Peru in 1982, in the city of Iquitos. Polish entrepreneur Stanisław Tymiński established a company called TVS (Televisión Selva) that year and was the first cable television system to deliver pay content to homes in Iquitos and in Peru. Eight years later, in 1990, controversial businessman Genaro Delgado-Parker established Peru's second cable television system in Lima, called Telecable, delivering contents via MMDS only to high-class neighborhoods. In 1993, Cable Mágico was established, widely spreading the reach of cable television to the middle and lower classes, expanding operations later that decade to the eight main cities throughout the country. From then on, many local companies started offering pay content in almost every town in Peru. These small companies are grouped through APTC (Asociacion Peruana de Television por Cable) and they count approximately 400 current members. According to INEI, the statistics organization for Peru, pay television services reach approximately 26% of the country's population and 52% of the population in Lima. DTH services are also offered by DirecTV, Claro and Movistar.

=== Uruguay ===
Cable television was introduced to Uruguay in 1970, in the city of Santa Teresa.
