= Altice (disambiguation) =

Altice is a Netherlands-based multinational telecoms company.

Altice may also refer to:

- Altice Dominicana S.A., a subsidiary operating in the Dominican Republic
- Altice Portugal, a subsidiary
- Altice USA, a former subsidiary of Altice that was spun-off as a separate company in 2019

== People with the surname ==
- Summer Altice, an American fashion model and actress

== See also ==
- Altice Arena, Lisbon, Portugal
- Altice Studio, a television channel in France
