= NoireTV =

- Type: Network
- Broadcast area: United States, United Kingdom, Caribbean (Jamaica), Africa
- Headquarters: Washington D.C.

Programming
- Picture format: 1080i (HDTV) (downscaled to 16:9 576i for the SDTV feed)

Ownership
- Owner: Caspen Media, LLC
- Sister channels: NoireTV Box Office (Native)

History
- Launched: March 23, 2011

Links
- Website: https://www.noiretv.com/

Availability

NoireTV is an American multinational premium cable channel owned by Caspen Media, LLC which launched on March 23, 2009. As of February 2021, NoireTV is available to approximately 21 million pay television households in the United States and around the world.

== History ==
Noire TV was founded by Emeka Iwukemjika as a graduate student at Wharton School of the University of Pennsylvania. Cablevision Corporation launched NoireTV on its Optimum cable tv platform on May 10, 2011. On May 20, 2014, Caspen Media signed an Affiliation agreement with Verizon Fios for the launch of NoireTV on the Verizon FiosTV platform. NoireTV was later launched on November 4, 2020 on Channel 269 on the Verizon Fios TV platform.

== Programming ==
NoireTV showcases music video programming such as diverse genres like Afrobeat, dancehall, and hip-hop along with syndicated movies and reality TV shows. The TV station also distributes original content developed in-house by its parent company, Caspen Media, which operates a closed-loop subscription model for content development and distribution.
