= Numericable =

French cable and telecommunications company

- Type: Subsidiary
- Industry: Telecommunications
- Founded: August 2007
- Defunct: November 2014
- Fate: Merged
- Successor: SFR
- Headquarters: La Défense, Paris, France
- Area served: Metropolitan France, Portugal, Belgium, Luxembourg
- Key people: Eric Denoyer (CEO)
- Revenue: ▲€1,314 million (2013)
- Number of employees: 2,182 (2013)
- Parent: Altice
- Website: numbericable.com at the Wayback Machine (archived 2014-02-22)

Numericable was a major French cable operator and telecommunications services company. The company provides cable broadband services in France, Luxembourg and Portugal, offering digital and analog television, Internet, and mobile phone services. It is a cable television provider and high-speed internet access provider in metropolitan France.

Originally created in 2006 from the merger between Noos and NC Numericable networks, Numericable was listed on the NYSE Euronext in 2013.

In 2014, Numericable made an offer to buy Vivendi's SFR telecommunications affiliate, France's second largest provider, and merged with SFR to form Numericable-SFR. In April 2016, the merged company adopted the SFR name across all its businesses.

== History ==
=== Early years ===
From the end of World War II until May 1981, when the French Socialist Party came swept to power with the election of François Mitterrand, the state held a monopoly on the production and distribution of audiovisual programmes on French territory. On July 29, 1982, Law 82-652 abolished the state monopoly and created both a Council and High Authority on Audiovisual Communication to oversee the liberalisation of the French audiovisual sector.

In 1982, the National Cable Plan was approved, with the ambitious goal of connecting one million households within five years and using the most advanced techniques of the time, including fiber-optic technology. In order to finance the project, a public-private partnership was put in place that allowed private operators to utilise the networks set up by France Telecom to commercial ends.

Regulations provided for highly favourable concessions that were awarded to private operators (up to 99 years). Water and Sewage Treatment service providers often diversified into the cable market and used their close ties with local municipalities to win concessions.

On June 6, 1985, the group Lyonnaise des eaux created the company Paris Câble, which would later become Lyonnaise Câble, Noos, and Numericable. Officially launched on November 25, 1986, the launch of the National Cable Plan marked the start of the commercial use of cable networks in Paris. In 1996, 16 regional operators merged into a national player, Lyonnaise Communications.

In May 2000, Noos became the brand name of Lyonnaise Communications in a move that was accompanied by the harmonization of Lyonnaise’s cable networks. Following its national expansion strategy, Noos took over the cable television assets of French group NTL in November 2001.

At this point, three cable operators were still in business: France Telecom, NC Numericable and Noos.

=== Numericable foundation ===
NC Numericable and Noos merged in 2006. One year later, the brand Noos disappeared and was replaced by the name Numericable. A new logo and marketing campaign was subsequently launched in August 2007. For the first time, all of French cable networks were technically owned by one company.

In 2005, Numéricâble launched its activities in the Antilles. In 2008, Le Câble Numericable bought WSG and MTVC, the major cable operators in Guadeloupe and Martinique.

In 2007, Numericable announced that it had signed a deal with Bouygues Telecom to use its mobile network, thereby opening the way to offering mobile services to its customers. The company subsequently launched the service in 2008.

Numericable was launched as a mobile virtual network operator on May 16, 2011, advertising an ‘unlimited’ offer and highlighting its competitiveness. To accompany its business development, Numericable launched a ‘triple play’ internet offer, costing four euros per month, on September 13, 2011.

In order to compete with new offers launched by rival company Free, Numericable launched an ‘unlimited’ mobile phone plan costing €19.99 per month on January 23, 2012, contributing to the company’s general move to lower prices.

To compete with competitors’ Internet terminals, Numericable announced the launch of ‘Box by Numericable’, a product that is both modem and receiver. According to the operator, the box allows access to 300 thematic channels, to the Internet and to make an unlimited number of calls to landlines and mobile numbers in France, as well as to several international locations. For the eligible clients, the Box allows a high-speed internet connection (up to 200 megabytes/second) as long as it is linked to a local network. The Box also gives its clients access to videos on-demand (VOD) and multiple social network applications, such as Twitter.

In October 2011, Numericable launched a €10 million nationwide advertising campaign with the advertising firm Fred & Farid that featured three fictional creatures that represent the three principal services of the company: television, internet and wireless communications. These mascots were named the Numiz (Cabiz in Portugal).

=== SFR acquisition and public offering ===
While the name of the group was Numericable, the management remained legally administered by two separate companies: Numericable SAS and NC Numericable (formerly known as Noos). Ypso Holding S.à r.l. was a holding company controlling Numericable companies, owned by the American Carlyle Group (35%), the British private-equity firm Cinven (35%) and Altice, a Luxembourg-based cable operator (30%). On 2 August 2013, Numericable Group SA was formed as the parent company of Numericable group companies.

On September 19, 2013, Numericable Group announced the launch of a legal and financial process aimed at the company’s initial public offering on the Paris stock exchange, regulated by NYSE Euronext. The declared objective was to obtain new financial resources to invest in French fiber-optic development. The shares were offered on 7 November 2013.

In November 2014, France’s competition watchdog approved a deal for Numericable to acquire Virgin Mobile France for €325 million.

SFR launched its fiber packages in November 2014, using the Numericable network and TV bouquets. In France, the cable networks had an exemption from exclusivity of TV channels. Following the launch of the SFR by Numericable offers, Canalsat has withdrawn the Numericable exemption, which has made it lose certain channels such as Eurosport, Disney XD, Disney Junior, Disney Cinema, Comédie+, Planète+, Télétoon+ and Piwi+.

Altice launched its SVOD service, Zive, on 17 November 2015. It was renamed SFR Play in late 2016.

Altice acquired the rights of many sports competitions (Premier League, Liga NOS, Champions League) to form its SFR Sport bouquet. Altice signed an exclusive agreement with Discovery and NBCUniversal in December 2016. The premium movies and series TV channel Altice Studio was launched on 22 August 2017.

Numericable was rebranded as SFR in Belgium and Luxembourg on 15 February 2016, with its launch of Zive.

In December 2016, Altice announced to sell SFR Belux to Telenet for €400 million.

The Numericable and SFR channels numbering were merged on 22 August 2017, and in 2019, the Numericable exclusive channels (MTV, Nickelodeon, Série Club, Cartoon Network...) were added to SFR ADSL offer. The brand Numericable disappeared.

== Operation ==
=== Services ===
The company provided the following services:

- Internet or TV access;
- Internet and telephone access;
- Internet, telephone and TV access;
- All the above services including a mobile phone contract.

Numericable controls the vast majority of the cable network in France, representing some 9.5 million potential households or about 32% of French households. The company has 3.5 million television subscribers, 1,037,000 for internet and 753,000 for telephone services.

As of June 2012, the cable operator counts over a half million high-speed fiber-optic customers and 4.6 million households connected to the network. Later that year in November 2012, a company press release announced that the number had grown to almost 600,000. According to figures published by Arcep, Numericable holds 70% of the high-speed fiber-optic market.

=== International network ===
Numericable also had operations in Luxembourg, Belgium, French Caribbean (Martinique, Guadeloupe and French Guiana) and Portugal.

In 2016, Numericable was replaced by SFR in Belgium, Luxembourg and Overseas France.

In Portugal, Altice sold Cabovisão, due to Meo acquisition, to Apax France and it was rebranded as Nowo on 19 September 2016.

=== Ownership ===
After its listing on the Paris NYSE Euronext stock exchange, Numericable main shareholders are the Luxembourg investment fund Altice (30%), which is listed under the ticker ATC on the Amsterdam NYSE Euronext stock exchange since January 2014 and is controlled and led by the French-Israeli investor and telecommunications executive Patrick Drahi, the American private-equity group Carlyle Group (26.3%), and the British private-equity firm Cinven (18.2%).
