= Cablevision =

Former American cable television company

Cablevision Systems Corporation
- Cablevision logo from 1984 to 2016.

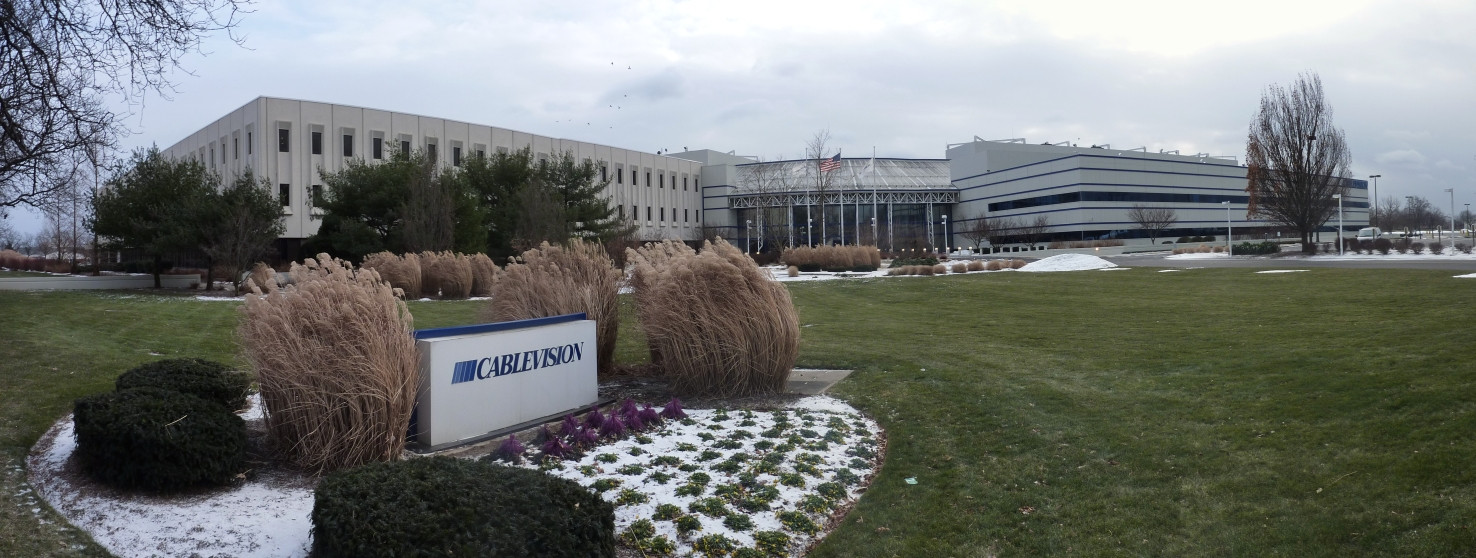
- Cablevision headquarters at the former Grumman campus in Bethpage, New York.
- Type: Public
- Traded as: NYSE: CVC S&P 100 component (until 2016) S&P 500 component (until 2016)
- Industry: Telecommunications; Mass media
- Founded: 1973; 53 years ago
- Founder: Charles F. Dolan
- Defunct: June 21, 2016; 10 years ago
- Fate: Acquired by Altice
- Successor: Optimum Communications
- Headquarters: Bethpage, New York, U.S.
- Area served: New York metropolitan area
- Key people: Charles F. Dolan (chairman); James Dolan (CEO); Brian Sweeney (president)
- Products: Cable (Internet) (VoIP Phone) (Business)
- Services: Optimum TV (Television); Optimum Online (Internet); Optimum Voice (VoIP Phone); Optimum Lightpath (Business); News 12; Newsday amNewYork; MSG Varsity
- Revenue: ▲$ 6.461 billion (2014)
- Operating income: ▲$921.25 million (2014)
- Net income: ▼$311.44 million (2014)
- Total assets: ▲$6.765 billion (2014)
- Total equity: ▼ −$5.041 billion (2014)
- Number of employees: 13,656 (Sept 2015)
- Divisions: Telecommunications Services

Cablevision Systems Corporation was an American cable television company with systems serving areas surrounding New York City. It was the fifth-largest cable provider and ninth-largest television provider in the United States. Throughout its existence and in its final years, Cablevision exclusively served customers residing in New York, New Jersey, Connecticut, and a small part of Pennsylvania. However, at one time it provided service in as many as 19 states. Cablevision also offered high-speed Internet connections (Optimum Online), digital cable (Optimum TV/IO Digital Cable), and VoIP (Optimum Voice) phone service (the eighth-largest telephone provider in the U.S.) through its Optimum brand name. Cablevision also offered a WiFi-only mobile phone service dubbed Freewheel.

The company also operated Rainbow Media alongside Comcast, Cox Communications, and Daniels & Associates from late 1980 until mid 2011 when Rainbow Media's assets were spun off into a newly established company initially known as AMC Networks (now known today as AMC Global Media), shutting down Rainbow Media in the process.

On June 21, 2016, Cablevision was acquired by European telecom conglomerate Altice. The former Cablevision services operate under Optimum Communications which continues to operate brands Optimum Online, Optimum Voice, and Optimum TV.

== History ==
In the mid-1960s, Charles Dolan built a cable system called Sterling Manhattan Cable in the borough of Manhattan and launched Home Box Office (HBO). He ended up selling both the cable system and HBO to Time Life Inc. He used the money to start a new cable system in suburban Long Island called CableVision. Cablevision, having changed its name from CableVision, quickly expanded by building on Long Island and acquiring smaller cable systems from other providers. Cablevision also built systems throughout the New York metro area: some of the other boroughs of New York City, New Jersey, Westchester County, and Connecticut.

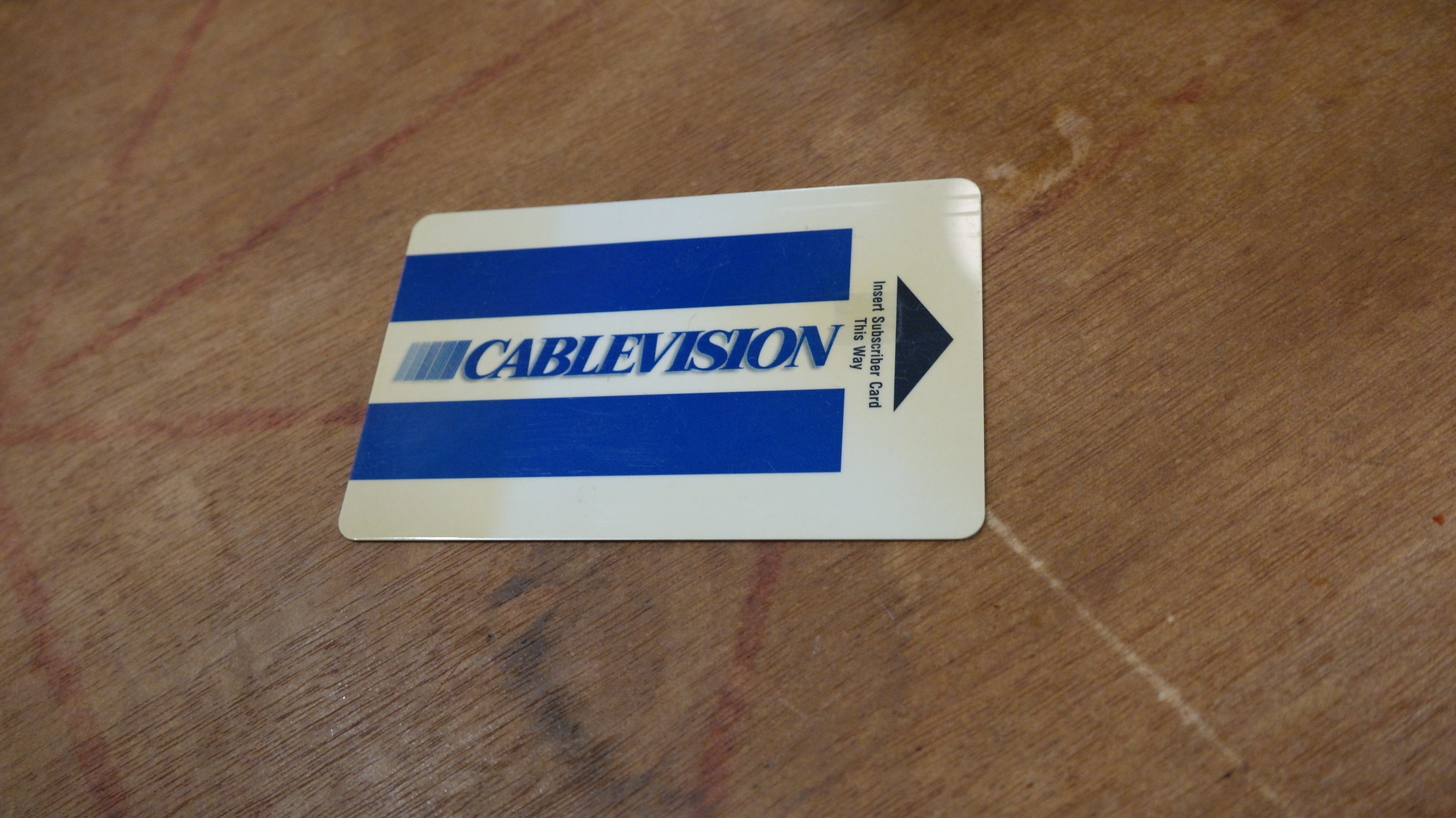
Cablevision access card from the 1990s

In the 1980s, Cablevision also expanded into the Chicago, Boston, and Cleveland areas. By the mid-1990s Cablevision would offer service to 2.9 million subscribers in 19 states. Through a series of transactions in the late 1990s, Cablevision consolidated its cable systems into three core areas: New York, Cleveland, and Boston. Despite reducing the number of areas served, they brought the number of subscribers to 3.5 million through these transactions. One major transaction made at this time was with Tele-Communications Inc. (TCI). Cablevision gained 10 New York area cable systems from TCI and in exchange TCI gained 33% ownership in the company. In 1999, AT&T Corporation took over TCI thus giving them the one-third ownership in Cablevision. In 2000, Cablevision sold-off its remaining systems outside the New York area in Boston, Cleveland, and Kalamazoo, Michigan to MediaOne, Adelphia, and Charter Communications respectively. As part of the deal, Cablevision traded its Boston area systems for MediaOne's Hudson Valley systems. AT&T sold its share of Cablevision in 2001.

On June 13, 2010, Cablevision announced that it would acquire Bresnan Communications for $1.37 billion. Bresnan provided service to about 308,000 cable subscribers in Colorado, Montana, Utah, and Wyoming. This is the first time in a decade that Cablevision has owned systems outside the New York area (although Bresnan, like Cablevision, had its headquarters in the New York City suburbs). In May 2011, Cablevision rebranded the Bresnan systems as Optimum West.

On February 8, 2013, Cablevision reached an agreement to sell its Optimum West systems to Charter Communications for US$1.63 billion.

On November 23, 2013, Cablevision laid off 400 employees.

On September 17, 2015, it was announced that Patrick Drahi's European telecom conglomerate Altice would acquire Cablevision for $17.7 billion, including debt, pending regulatory approval. The deal was approved by the FCC on May 3, 2016 and after approval from various regional regulators such as New Jersey's Board of Public Utilities and the New York Public Service Commission, closed on June 21, 2016. Under the terms of the deal, Altice paid $34.90 in cash for each share in Cablevision and a 22% premium to the company's stock price; Altice also assumed Cablevision's debt. The former assets of Cablevision operate as Optimum Communications.

=== Role in the West Side Stadium debate ===
In 2004 and 2005, Cablevision provided funding for an advertising campaign against the proposed construction of a stadium on the West Side of Manhattan supported by the Mayor of New York City, Michael Bloomberg. The stadium would have principally served the New York Jets, and was an essential part of New York City's failed bid for the 2012 Olympics. Cablevision had offered a competitive bid that far exceeded the bid of the Jets for property owned by the Metropolitan Transportation Authority, where the new stadium would have been located. The plans to build the stadium were abandoned in June 2005 when the New York State Assembly under the leadership of Speaker Sheldon Silver refused to provide state subsidies for the project.

=== Philanthropy ===
In 1998, Cablevision helped found The Lustgarten Foundation, which has become the largest private foundation dedicated solely to funding pancreatic cancer research in America. The foundation was named after former Cablevision chairman Marc Lustgarten and has raised over $16 million. Cablevision currently underwrites the foundation, covering all administrative and fundraising costs, allowing 100% of all donations to go directly to research programs and grants to help cure pancreatic cancer, as well as sponsoring dozens of walks/runs across the country. The foundation is a 4-star charity on Charity Navigator, ranking at this level for its organizational and financial transparency, low administrative costs, board, and growth.

== The Madison Square Garden Company ==
In 1994, Paramount Communications (formerly Gulf+Western), the owner of Madison Square Garden, was acquired by Viacom, who in turn sold the MSG properties to Cablevision and ITT Corporation, which had 50% ownership each. ITT would sell its share to Cablevision three years later.

On February 9, 2010, Cablevision spun off its subsidiary Madison Square Garden, L.P. into a new company named The Madison Square Garden Company (MSG). Although a separate company, it was run by the Cablevision CEO, James Dolan. He remained an important figure in both companies until Cablevision's sale in 2016, and continues to head MSG. The company has three divisions consisting of professional sports teams, two regional sports networks, and several entertainment venues.

MSG controls its namesake Madison Square Garden arena in New York City, and the professional sports teams that play there: the New York Knicks and New York Rangers. The same company also owns the Hartford Wolf Pack, a Hartford, Connecticut based minor-league professional hockey team affiliated with the Rangers.

MSG also holds the TV rights for the Knicks, Rangers, New York Islanders, New Jersey Devils, Buffalo Sabres and New York Red Bulls through their cable channels MSG Network, MSG Plus (formerly FSN New York), and MSG Western New York. Cablevision previously had the rights to the New York Yankees, New Jersey Nets and New York Mets, who left to start their own channels. Cablevision also previously attempted to purchase the Yankees, Mets and Boston Red Sox, in part, to control their broadcast rights.

Other properties that are owned by MSG include the Beacon Theatre, The Theatre at Madison Square Garden (formerly known as Felt Forum, Paramount and WaMu Theatre), and a long-term lease to operate Radio City Music Hall.

== Cable Networks ==
=== AMC Networks ===
On July 1, 2011, Cablevision spun off its subsidiary, formerly known as Rainbow Media LLC, into a new company named AMC Networks, now known today as AMC Global Media. It owns several national cable networks including AMC, IFC, Sundance Channel, and WE tv. Wedding Central, a cable channel that was launched as a spin-off of WE tv in 2009, was also run by Rainbow Media. However, upon AMC Networks achieving its independence of Cablevision, the channel was shut down due to low ratings. Rainbow Media also controlled Fuse TV until 2010, when ownership was transferred to Cablevision's Madison Square Garden division, now operating independently as The Madison Square Garden Company (see above). The Rainbow Media subsidiary of Cablevision also operated a satellite television company called Voom, which was shut down on April 30, 2005, but lived on as a series of high-definition television channels named Voom HD Networks. They were available on Cablevision and iO digital cable until January 21, 2009. However, the 15 U.S. channels were eventually also shut down due to lack of distribution prior to the spinning off of Rainbow Media from Cablevision as the independent AMC Networks.

=== SportsChannel ===
Cablevision also owned the former SportsChannel America from its beginning in 1976 until it was dissolved into Fox Sports Net in the late 1990s. In 2007 Cablevision sold its control of FSN Bay Area and FSN New England to Comcast for $570 million. These were the last of their regional sports networks outside the New York area.

== Other properties ==
Cablevision acquired the New York-area electronics chain The Wiz in 1998. The chain was closed in 2003. Since then the name was sold to P. C. Richard & Son and currently remains as a dormant subsidiary of the company only showing Wiz Deals on some P.C. Richard items.

From 1998 until April 29, 2013, Cablevision owned New York-area cinema chain Clearview Cinemas. It was sold to Bow Tie Cinemas of Connecticut.

On July 29, 2008, Cablevision acquired Newsday and amNewYork in a deal worth $650m. The Dolan family maintained majority ownership of Newsday, with Altice USA having a 25% share until the properties were sold in 2023.

== Carriage disputes ==
=== MSG Network ===
From September 1988 through July 1989, Cablevision did not carry MSG Network (at the time owned by Gulf+Western, which later became Paramount Communications) over the question of whether MSG should be offered as a basic service or a premium service. This move also occurred as New York Yankees games on cable moved to MSG from Cablevision-owned SportsChannel. The Cablevision position was that those who wished to pay for sports programming should shoulder the burden, not every consumer. This dispute ended with Cablevision offering MSG as a premium subscription service.

=== YES Network ===
Cablevision did not carry most of the games of the New York Yankees in 2002, because they would not accept the price asked during the inaugural season of YES Network. Again, at the root of the argument was who was to pay for sports programming. Cablevision wanted to offer YES as a premium service, like MSG and Fox Sports NY, where YES ownership wanted the channel on the 'Family Cable' tier. After a long standoff, a deal was made the following year. As a result, YES, along with MSG and Fox Sports NY, moved to the 'Family Cable' Tier.

=== NFL Network ===
Until 2012, Cablevision never carried the NFL Network, as the company stated that it would like to be able to carry NFL Sunday Ticket (which was, by contract, exclusive to DirecTV until the completion of the 2022 season) before it carries NFL Network. This has been criticized by New Jersey legislators. Recently however, Cablevision purchased Bresnan Communications, a company headquartered in Purchase, New York, but which did all of its business in the Rocky Mountain region. Because of this, the NFL Network is carried on the former Bresnan (now Optimum West) systems, but not on Optimum systems in Greater New York. Finally, on August 16, 2012, Cablevision announced that they have reached an agreement with the NFL to carry the network on all its systems effective August 17.

=== Tennis Channel ===
Cablevision also carried the Tennis Channel for a brief period of time from October 2009 to September 2011. Cablevision joined the NCTC in August 2009 just to carry the Tennis Channel on the premium sports package which costs extra per month. By joining NCTC the Tennis Channel was forced to give its signal to Cablevision. Once the Tennis Channel's contract expired with NCTC on September 3, 2011, the Tennis Channel pulled its signal from all cable carriers unwilling to negotiate a new deal or carry the channel more widespread. The Tennis Channel was pulled from Verizon but returned on January 17, 2012. Cablevision has yet to make any attempt at bringing the Tennis Channel back as of June 2012.

=== ESPN3 and WatchESPN ===
Cablevision never carried ESPN360.com, rebranded as ESPN3.com, a broadband service of ESPN. Also, Cablevision had yet to carry and give customers access to WatchESPN which is an app that allows customers to watch ESPN Networks when they are not at home. ESPN requires users to give what cable provider they subscribe to in order to watch and Cablevision had yet to agree to carry WatchESPN.

On October 4, 2012, ESPN and Cablevision announced a comprehensive distribution and carriage agreement which included access for Cablevision customers to ESPN3 and WatchESPN in addition to other Watch apps covering the Walt Disney Company's family of networks. On November 19, Cablevision announced that ESPN3 was available to Optimum Online Customers. A month later on December 19, WatchESPN was released to Optimum TV Customers.

=== Verizon FiOS ===
Cablevision, as a content provider, also engaged in a dispute with Verizon over the carriage of MSG Network and Fox Sports Net New York on its FiOS television systems. Verizon sued Cablevision, claiming that Cablevision, which still owned MSG Network along with all Madison Square Garden-related properties at the time, did not want to make their valuable local sports coverage of the NHL's New York Rangers, New York Islanders, and New Jersey Devils and the NBA's New York Knicks and New Jersey Nets available to an emerging competitor to their cable systems. An agreement was reached in November 2006 (shortly after the NHL and NBA began their 2006–07 seasons) allowing FiOS to carry these channels. However, MSG's programming was restricted to standard-definition on FiOS systems until the 2011-12 NHL and NBA seasons, when a court order forced Cablevision to provide Verizon with the HD feeds to their sports programming.

Additionally, Cablevision owned exclusive rights to the MSNBC news network in its service territory, preventing its carriage by FiOS in overlapping areas. However, this exclusivity ended in February 2010.

=== 2010 carriage disputes ===
==== January 2010: Food Network and HGTV dispute ====
Because it was unable to reach a deal with Scripps Networks Interactive concerning retransmission fees, Scripps Networks Interactive revoked Cablevision's rights to carry the disputed channels, HGTV and the Food Network, on January 1, 2010. Cablevision issued a statement saying, "We wish Scripps well and have no expectation of carrying their programming again, given the dramatic changes in their approach to working with distributors to reach television viewers." While the channels were affected, Cablevision ran commercials advertising their point of view and set up an area on their website to send out messages to Scripps Networks to tell them to re-carry Food Network and Home & Garden Television. Cablevision also looped a public service announcement on each affected channel and forced all of its customers' set-top boxes to channel 1999, which looped the same announcement. Cablevision and Scripps reached an agreement, and as of January 21, 2010, the two networks were back on Cablevision systems. The details of the agreement have not been disclosed.

==== March 2010: ABC contract dispute affecting WABC-TV and WPVI ====
On March 2, 2010, WABC-TV in New York along with Philadelphia sister station WPVI (carried in Mercer, Monmouth and Ocean counties) stated that they would pull their programming from Cablevision on March 7, 2010 (at midnight), unless a new payment structure is implemented for its network programming. Cablevision responded by citing WABC-TV and WPVI's free, over-the-air accessibility. Cablevision spokesman Charles Scheuler stated "It is not fair for ABC-Disney to hold Cablevision customers hostage by forcing them to pay what amounts to a new TV tax."

The removal of both stations occurred on the weekend of the 82nd Academy Awards, which was scheduled to be one of ABC's largest yearly specials, and was projected to cause a devastating blow to advertisers for the Oscars and to Cablevision itself.

On Sunday, March 7, 2010, at 12:01 am ET, both WABC and WPVI were removed from Cablevision leaving a black screen in their place, confirming the rumors that if a deal with Cablevision and ABC was not reached by midnight, the network and other Disney-owned channels would go off the air.

Cablevision began looping a public service announcement on each affected channel and forcing all of its customers' set-top boxes to channel 1999, which was looping the same announcement, much like was done when Scripps Networks pulled their cable channels' programming. Besides providing certain details of the disagreement they stated that ABC shows could be watched online through TV websites such as Hulu.

Also that day, Cablevision announced through e-mail that their entire film catalog of on-demand movies would be available without charge until midnight that evening as an apology to their customers.

At 8:50 pm that day, WABC and WPVI returned to Cablevision's programming, after a notification during the 82nd Academy Awards announced progression in "Work to complete our negotiations", and the return of ABC's programming during the negotiations.

==== October 2010: FOX and MyNetworkTV dispute affecting WNYW-TV, WWOR-TV and WTXF-TV ====
Cablevision's contract with News Corp to carry Fox (including MyNetworkTV) expired on October 15, 2010. The contract included WNYW and WWOR-TV in New York and WTXF in Philadelphia. The contract also included the cable networks National Geographic Wild, Fox Business, and Fox Deportes (formerly Fox Sports en Español). Programming affected by the dispute included the coverage of the NFL on Fox, the 2010 National League Championship Series, part of the 2010 World Series, and popular shows like American Idol and Glee.

On October 16, 2010, at 12:01 am, Fox pulled all of their networks involved in the dispute from Cablevision subscribers. Because of Cablevision's dispute with Fox, Cablevision customers missed multiple new episodes of Fox network programming, multiple weeks of the NBA season, and the entire NLCS. Cablevision looped a public service announcement on each affected channel and forcing all of its customers' set-top boxes to channel 1999, which looped the same announcement, much like was done when Scripps Networks and ABC/Disney pulled their cable channels' programming. On October 27, 2010, the same day as Game 1 of the World Series, Cablevision offered a new one-year deal to FOX, which was rejected, continuing the blackout. Cablevision also repeatedly called on FOX to submit to binding arbitration, an offer which FOX repeatedly did not take Cablevision up on.

The channels were restored during the evening of October 30, 2010, the same day as Game 3 of the World Series. News Corp and Cablevision reached a deal "in principle" to restore the channels. News Corp did not disclose the terms of the deal, but Cablevision said it paid the higher fees Fox and News Corp wanted, "because it does not think its customers should any longer be denied the Fox programs they wish to see."

=== Game Show Network ===
In February 2011, Cablevision moved the Game Show Network (GSN) from the basic tier to an add-on sports package. In October 2011, GSN filed a lawsuit claiming that the network was being discriminated against because Cablevision gave preference to other channels that they owned (AMC Networks) which did not move. In November 2016, a Federal Communications Commission administrative law judge that Cablevision had acted unlawfully and recommended that the FCC require Cablevision (now Altice) to carry the channel on their expanded basic tier and imposed a maximum fine of $400,000.

=== Tribune Company dispute ===
On August 17, 2012, without warning, Cablevision pulled stations from the Tribune Company. The removed stations included WPIX (New York), which is carried on most Cablevision systems, WPHL (Philadelphia) on Central Jersey systems in Mercer, Monmouth and Ocean Counties, WCCT (Hartford, CT) on some Connecticut systems, and KWGN (Denver) on Optimum West systems in Colorado and Wyoming. WTIC-TV and WGN America were initially not included in this dispute, but on August 24, Tribune pulled WTIC in Connecticut and WGN from Cablevision's Connecticut and Optimum West systems. Like the dispute with Time Warner Cable and Hearst Television, these channels were replaced with other cable offerings.

In a statement, Cablevision said that "The bankrupt Tribune Co. and the hedge funds and banks that own it, including Oaktree Capital Management, Angelo Gordon & Co. and others, are trying to solve Tribune's financial problems on the backs of Cablevision customers. Tribune and their hedge fund owners are demanding tens of millions in new fees for WPIX and other stations they own. They should stop their anti-consumer demands and work productively to reach an agreement."

Tribune, in its own statement, said that "Cablevision took this action despite our offer of an unconditional extension of the current carriage agreement with no change in terms while negotiations continued. To be clear, Tribune was willing to provide Cablevision subscribers access to the valuable programming on these stations while working toward a new agreement. Tribune never made any threat to withdraw these stations or any demand that Cablevision remove them. Tribune makes a substantial annual investment in local news, live sports and high-quality entertainment programming. Cablevision has never compensated Tribune for the retransmission of its local stations, which are among the most highly watched channels on Cablevision's lineups. What we have proposed amounts to less than a penny a day per subscriber, well below what Cablevision pays to providers of less well-watched channels".

The dispute between the two companies ended on October 26, 2012, when Cablevision reached an agreement with Tribune after Connecticut viewers complained about not seeing the first two games of the 2012 World Series. The channels were not restored until the morning of October 27.

=== Meredith Corporation dispute ===
On January 3, 2014, WFSB, the CBS station in Hartford, CT, pulled its signal from Cablevision's Connecticut systems. The dispute was due to the fact that Cablevision did not want to pay Meredith Corporation, the station's owner, for Fairfield County and Litchfield County customers, because they already had the flagship CBS station, WCBS-TV from New York. The dispute ended on January 19.

== Corporate governance ==
At the time of the sale to Altice, the board of directors of Cablevision were: Charles Dolan, James Dolan, Patrick Dolan, Kristin Dolan, Marianne Dolan Weber, Rand Araskog, Frank Biondi, Charles Ferris, Richard Hochman, Victor Oristano, Thomas Reifenheiser, John R. Ryan, Brian Sweeney, Vincent Tese, Leonard Tow.

In 2006, the Dolan family announced a plan to purchase the company and privatize it, after a failed attempt in 2005, which would have spun off Rainbow Media as a publicly traded company.

On May 2, 2007, after repeated attempts, the Dolan family announced that a deal worth $10.6 billion had been reached for Cablevision to be taken private, but agreement was not reached with other shareholders. Cablevision stock trades under the ticker symbol CVC on the New York Stock Exchange.

== Financial records ==
On November 11, 2003, the company admitted that it had misrepresented some of its finances. It would restate its previously reported financial statements for the first and second quarters of 2003, and would revise the quarterly financial results released that day, to reflect the impact of expenses totaling approximately $15 million that were improperly recorded in 2002 and earlier periods. On March 2, 2004, the company also said it would restate annual results for 2000 to 2002, in addition to its previously announced restatement of quarterly results in 2002 and 2003.

== See also ==
- List of United States telephone companies
