= Altice Studio =

French pay television network

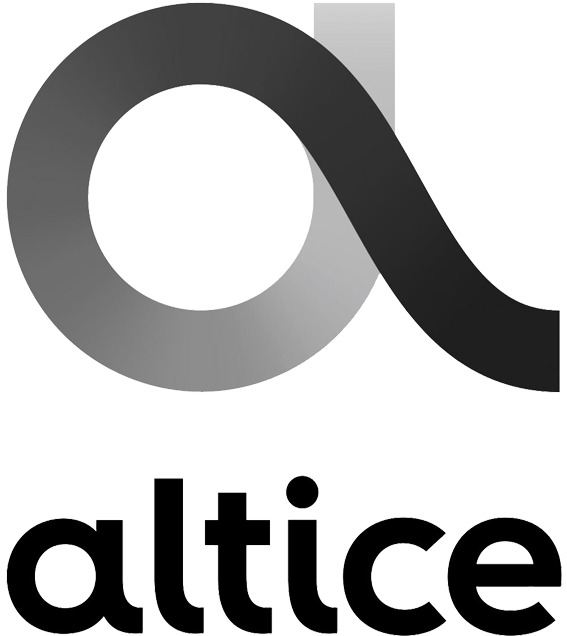
- Country: France
- Broadcast area: France
- Headquarters: Paris, France

Programming
- Languages: French; English
- Picture format: 1080i (HDTV); 576i (SDTV)

Ownership
- Owner: Altice France (Altice)

History
- Launched: 22 August 2017; 9 years ago
- Closed: 22 March 2023; 3 years ago

Links
- Website: sfr.fr/altice-studio

Altice Studio was a French Premium pay television channel dedicated to movies and series operated by Altice France.

The channel launched on 22 August 2017 as part of the company strategy to produce content and provide to their subscribers their own television channel, like their competitor Orange S.A. with the OCS channels.

Altice Studio was available exclusively on SFR, and Canal+ from 2020 to 2022. Their subscribers had the option to subscribe to Altice Studio.

Most of the Altice Studio programmes were also available on SFR Play, the subscription video on demand service owned by SFR, until 30 June 2020 when the service became only for kids and the adult programmes are unavailable.

== History ==
On 17 May 2017, Alain Weill announced the launch of a television channel named SFR Studio.

On 11 July 2017, the group announced that the channel name will be Altice Studio and revealed an exclusive contract with NBCUniversal and Paramount Pictures.

In November 2017, SFR Sat packages were launched on Fransat with 3 offers: SFR Play, SFR Sport and Altice Studio. SFR Play and Altice Studio were removed of Fransat on 31 October 2019, but RMC Sport stayed available until 31 December 2021.

On 18 August 2020, Altice Studio was added to Canal+, as an option for 5€.

On 30 June 2022, Altice Studio ceased transmissions on Canal+.

On 22 March 2023, the channel was closed due to competitions like Netflix, Amazon Prime and Disney+.

== Series ==
- Absentia
- Almost Family
- Betoolot (Sirènes)
- Inhumans
- Last Flight
- Medici: Masters of Florence (Les Médicis : Maîtres de Florence)
- Riviera
- The Same Sky
- The Sinner
- Taken
- Victoria
- Britannia
