= SFR =

French telecommunications company

SFR S.A.
- Type: Société anonyme
- Industry: Telecommunications
- Founded: 18 November 1987; 39 years ago
- Headquarters: Altice Campus, Paris, France
- Area served: France, Réunion, Mayotte, Guadeloupe, Martinique
- Key people: Matthieu Cocq (CEO)
- Products: Box de SFR, Home by SFR, mobile phones
- Services: Fixed-line internet, mobile internet, fixed-line and mobile telephony, IP television
- Revenue: €10.797 billion (2019)
- Operating income: €4.055 billion (2019)
- Net income: €2.898 billion (2019)
- Owner: through Altice France S.A. : Altice Group Lux (Patrick Drahi) : 55 % BlackRock, Fidelity Investments, PIMCO : 45 %
- Number of employees: 6,000 (2020)
- Subsidiaries: RED by SFR, SFR Business
- Website: sfr.fr sfr.re sfrcaraibe.fr

SFR S.A. (or Altice France S.A. for the group) (French: [ɛsɛfɛʁ]; in full: Société française du radiotéléphone [sɔsjete fʁɑ̃sɛːz dy ʁadjotelefɔn]) is a French telecommunications company. It is both the second-oldest mobile network operator and the second largest telecommunications company in France, after Orange.

The group, Altice France S.A. (formerly Numericable Group, then SFR Group), has been 55% owned since 2025 by Franco-Israeli businessman Patrick Drahi via Altice Group Lux, and 45% by various creditors such as BlackRock, Fidelity and PIMCO.

As of December 2015, SFR had 21.9 million customers in Metropolitan France for mobile services and it provided 6.35 million households with high-speed internet access.

SFR also offers services in the overseas departments of France, in the Caribbean Islands of Martinique, Guadeloupe, and in Guyane through SFR Caraïbe, and in the Indian Ocean, in Mayotte and the Réunion islands through SRR (Société Réunionnaise du Radiotéléphone; also branded as SFR Réunion). SFR Belux operated in Belgium as a cable operator and MVNO in some communes of Brussels Region, and in some areas of Luxembourg (as SFR Luxembourg). The division was sold to rival Telenet (owned by Liberty Global) in December 2016.

Although Vodafone sold its 44% stake in the operator in April 2011, SFR has remained Vodafone's local partner ever since.

== History ==
=== Origins ===
SFR was founded in 1987 in order for its then-parent company Compagnie Générale des Eaux (CGE) to start offering a 1G mobile phone service using the modified Nordic telecommunications standard NMT-F, to be operated in competition with the then-telephony incumbent France Télécom's Radiocom 2000 network. SFR also became the second French mobile network operator (after France Télécom) to launch 2G GSM services, which it did on 15 November 1992.

=== SFR-Cegetel (1996–2005), then SFR (2005–2014) ===
In 1996, CGE spun off SFR and all its other telecommunications activities into a new holding company called SFR-Cegetel (later just Cegetel), which also became a competing provider of fixed-line telecommunication services, as well as a major ISP and a shareholder of the French operations of America Online (AOL), as part of AOL's European operations which AOL of the United States ran as a joint venture with the German conglomerate Bertelsmann.

Vodafone had a 44% share in SFR until April 2011, when it sold its entire share back to SFR's founding parent company Vivendi. SFR is a major partner network of Vodafone in France.

=== Patrick Drahi era ===
==== Numericable-SFR Group (2014–2016) ====
Vivendi announced in March 2014 that it planned to sell its SFR division. On 14 March, it announced that it would enter exclusive negotiations with Altice/Numericable, to the exclusion of Bouygues and Iliad. Arnaud Montebourg, the French Minister for Industrial Renewal, triggered considerable concern when he stated that the Numericable/SFR deal was a certainty. Iliad lost 7.5% of its market value on that day.

SFR having 28.6 million subscribers versus 1.7 million for Numericable and much more notoriety, Patrick Drahi announced that SFR will replace Numericable. In late 2015, Numericable Outremer became SFR Caraïbe. On 15 February 2016, Numericable was rebranded as SFR in Belgium and Luxembourg, with the launch of new packages and the SVOD service Zive.

In February 2016, Orange, SFR and Free announced the purchase of their competitor Bouygues Telecom. However, negotiations for the purchase agreement fell through a few months later.

==== SFR Group (2016–2018) ====
In April 2016, the Numericable-SFR Group, now chaired by former Alcatel-Lucent CEO Michel Combes, announced it was renaming itself "SFR Group" and a new organization with three divisions:

- the media (SFR Média) and advertising sales (SFR Publicité) parts headed by Alain Weill;
- the telecoms branch (SFR Télécom) steered by Michel Paulin.

SFR acquires 49% of NextRadioTV (the BFM and RMC channels) and the activities of Altice Media Group France (the French press titles Libération and L'Express) from Altice, its main shareholder, for around 600 million euros.

On 25 May 2016, SFR announced that it had finalized the acquisition of Altice Media Group France, and on 12 May 2016, SFR's takeover of Altice's stake in NextRadioTV was finalized.

In December 2016, Altice sold SFR Belux to Telenet. SFR was merged in Belgium with Telenet on 31 March 2019, and SFR Luxembourg merged with Eltrona on 1 April 2020.

In January 2017, SFR announced its intention to acquire 100% of the News Participations and NextRadioTV, a process finalized in April 2018.

On 23 May 2017, Altice, parent company of SFR, announced its intention to rebrand all of the group's telecom subsidiaries as "Altice". The aim for Altice is to replace the group's historic local brands such as Portugal Telecom, as well as Optimum, and Suddenlink in the US under a single international brand and to re-invoice local subsidiaries (including SFR) for its use. As far as SFR is concerned, the actual changeover was initially scheduled for June 2018, but did not take place.

On 9 November 2017, Patrick Drahi set up a new governance with Alain Weill as CEO. Its aim is to "determine the group's strategic, operational, commercial and technological direction, and its execution", following the difficulties encountered by the group.

==== Altice France (2018–) ====
===== Reorganizations following difficulties =====
In January 2018, with the announcement of the spin-off of its shareholder, Altice was renamed Altice Europe and was then made up of SFR Group, Altice International and Altice Pay TV, which holds the broadcasting rights acquired by SFR. On 9 February 2018, SFR Group is renamed "Altice France".

On 20 April 2018, the French regulatory body CSA authorized the takeover of NextRadioTV by Altice France, with Altice France becoming the #1 player in telecom-media convergence in France. On 24 May 2018, we learn that the entire NextRadioTV group is moving to join SFR in a gigantic complex in Paris in the fall.

On 30 November 2018, Altice Europe announced that Altice France had reached an exclusive agreement to sell 49.99% of the capital of SFR FTTH, the structure housing SFR's fiber network assets outside major cities, to an investor group comprising Allianz Capital Partners, Axa Investment Managers Real Assets and OMERS Infrastructure for 1.8 billion euros. This values SFR FTTH at 3.6 billion euros, while retaining 100% ownership of its cable network (nine million outlets) and its 2.5 million fiber outlets in high-density areas. This agreement is in line with Altice Europe's debt reduction strategy and will enable it to make savings, since SFR FTTH will only include one million fiber outlets at the end of 2018, and will have to build as many each year to reach five million outlets by the end of 2022.

In May 2020, the unions were warned of a forthcoming savings plan in the media branch. The free sports news channel RMC Sport News will cease broadcasting on 2 June 2020.

In 2020, with the approval of the European Commission, SFR FTTH acquired Covage to become Orange's main infrastructure competitor in France.

In February 2021, Altice France announced the sale of its majority stake in Hivory, which manages 10,500 telecom towers, to the Spanish group Cellnex, for an enterprise value of 5.2 billion euros. In March 2021, SFR FTTH changes its name to XP Fibre.

In March 2021, Altice France announced the reduction of 1,700 jobs, including 400 in SFR stores, partly as a result of the drop in footfall linked to Covid-19, with the remainder of job cuts affecting a wide range of activities (Consumer, Network, B2B, Human Resources).

In June 2021, Altice France acquires the French virtual operator Prixtel, for an undisclosed sum. In September 2021, Altice France announces the acquisition of French virtual operator Coriolis Télécom for 415 million euros. In May 2022, Altice France also announces the purchase of SYMA. Mesrop Yeremian, founder of SYMA, takes over as head of Altice France's Mobile Virtual Network Operator (MVNO) division.

===== Financial difficulties and sale of 45% of the group =====
At the end of 2022, the telecom operator commissioned the U.S.-based investment bank Perella Weinberg Partners to sell 92 data centers, a sale expected to be worth around one billion euros. On 21 November 2023, Altice France sold 70% of UltraEdge, a division of SFR Business comprising its 257 data centers, to Morgan Stanley Infrastructure Partners for 530 million euros.

On 3 September 2024, SFR suffered a data leak that included the IBAN. The number of customers affected is unknown.

In February 2025, the main shareholder of Altice France and the Altice Group, Patrick Drahi, negotiated a reduction in Altice France's debt from 24 billion to 15.5 billion euros in exchange for the sale of a 45% stake to Altice France's creditors.

The financial model developed for the SFR acquisition (purchase on credit) was repeated for each external growth operation. Over the years, Patrick Drahi accumulated debt, but the scaffolding worked because interest rates were low, the profitability of the acquired companies was higher than the cost of the debt, and the financial community trusted Patrick Drahi to refinance his debt. But in 2022, the structure came crashing down due to the central banks' decision to raise interest rates. Average rates in the Altice Group will then be 10%. At the same time, subscriber attrition drove down the profitability of the group's companies. The group then found itself with significant debt maturities to repay in the 2020s and a prohibitive debt refinancing rate: the Moody's rating agency classified Altice's group debt as "Caa2" in March 2024, i.e. ultra-speculative. To save his group, Patrick Drahi began implementing a new strategy: selling off assets (around 10 billion euros) and negotiating with creditors to waive part of the debt (around 20%), in order to bring the debt-to-EBITDA ratio down to around four (compared with six in 2024, before the new strategy was applied).

In June 2025, Altice France filed for Chapter 15 bankruptcy protection, weeks after it also entered safeguard proceedings in France.

On 14 October 2025, a consortium composed of Orange, Bouygues Telecom and Iliad (owner of Free) made a 17 billion euro offer to buy SFR from Altice. Altice Group refused the offer on 15 October 2025.

At the start of 2026, the group didn't want to make a new offer. So Patrick Drahi, owner of Altice France, considered selling the different business of SFR separately. They got 4 different offers for Netco, their fiber network in major cities, valuing this asset between 4.5 and 5.8 billion euros. They also received 5 offers for SFR Business, valuing the asset between 1.8 and 2.3 billion euros.

However, on 17 April 2026, a new offer of 20.35 billion euros was accepted. Bouygues Telecom will own 41%, Free 31% and Orange 27% of the company. They had until 15 May to finalise the terms of the agreement. In June 2026, Bouygues Telecom, Free, and Orange announced the signing of a memorandum of understanding with Altice France.

== Slogans ==
Former 3D logo of SFR from 2014 to 18 October 2022.

- 1987–1990: "Parce qu'un abonné SFR n'est pas qu'un simple numéro"
- 1990–1994: "Ligne SFR, Le téléphone liberté"
- 1994–1996: "SFR, Le monde sans fil est à vous"
- 1996–1999: "Sans fil SFR, le monde est à vous"
- 1999–2000: "Vous n'avez pas fini d'être LIBRE"
- 2000–2001: "SFR, le meilleur réseau"
- 2001–2003: "Vous serez toujours plus qu'un simple numéro"
- 2003–2004: "Plus de plaisir"
- 2004–2007: "Parlons mieux, parlons mobile"
- 2007–2008: "Vivons mobile"
- 2008–2010: "SFR, et le monde est à vous"
- 2010–2014: "Carrément vous"
- 2014–2015: "Smart comme vous"
- 2015–2016: "SFR, et tout s'accélère"
- 2016–2017: "#NewSFR"
- 2017: "Pour vous, SFR change"
- 2017–2018: "SFR, en chemin vers le meilleur"
- 2018-2022: "SFR, enjoy"
- 2022-2025: "Soyez vous"
- 2025 : "On s'engage pour vous"

== SFR TV ==
SFR TV is a television service accessible on La Box de SFR and La Box Fibre de SFR, which delivers television programs via the broadband internet telephone network (xDSL), high-speed internet (FTTH or FTTB fiber within Numericable). The service was also broadcast by satellite with SFR Sat available on the Astra 19.2°E satellite until October 2015.

The SFR TV package includes more than 200 channels, some pay-tv channels can be added as an option, by subscribing to a specific paid package, classified by theme (sport, youth, music, international ...).

On 17 November 2015, Numericable-SFR launched its SVOD service Zive, for the Power bouquet subscribers. Zive and Power packages became SFR Play in 2016.

Altice signed an exclusive agreement with Discovery and NBCUniversal in December 2016. The premium movies and series TV channel Altice Studio was launched on 22 August 2017.

The Numericable and SFR channels numbering were merged on 22 August 2017, and in 2019, the Numericable exclusive channels (MTV, Nickelodeon, J-One, Série Club, Cartoon Network...) were added to SFR ADSL offer. The brand Numericable disappeared.

== SFR Sport ==
SFR Sport 1 began broadcasting on 13 August 2016. They are available for SFR, Canal+, My.T and OTT subscribers.

In 2016, Altice acquired the rights of many sports competitions (Premier League, Liga NOS, Champions League) to form its SFR Sport bouquet. MCS, MCS Extrême and Kombat Sport were rebranded as SFR Sport 2, SFR Sport 3 and SFR Sport 5; and SFR Sport 1 and 4K were launched. The SFR Sport bouquet became RMC Sport on 3 July 2018.

== RED by SFR ==
RED by SFR was launched on 11 October 2011 as SFR's online-only, lower cost flanker brand, in preparation for the launch of Free Mobile the following year.

== See also ==
- Altice Studio
- List of mobile network operators in Europe
- Meo
- Telecommunications in France
