= Cable Authority =

UK statutory body

The Cable Authority was the statutory body established by the Cable and Broadcasting Act 1984 to regulate the newly liberalised industry of cable television in the United Kingdom. It came into existence on 1 December 1984 and took on its functions with effect from 1 January 1985. Its responsibilities were taken over by the new Independent Television Commission on 1 January 1991.

The Authority consisted of a board of members appointed by the Home Secretary under the chairmanship of Richard Burton, former chairman of Gillette UK, and an executive staff headed by Jon Davey as Director General.

The Authority had two main functions. The first was the grant of licences, following a competitive franchising procedure, for the provision of services over a new broadband cable system in a specified geographical area. Franchises were to be exclusive, and were granted after examination of the applicants' financial capacity and their plans, according to a series of criteria laid down in the Act of Parliament. By the end of the Authority's life, 136 cable franchises had been awarded, embracing about 15 million homes of the 22 million in the UK.

The second main function was the regulation of the programme services carried by cable systems. To this end the Authority was required to draw up codes on programme standards (covering taste and decency, accuracy and impartiality of news, etc.), advertising practice and sponsorship, and then monitor programme services to ensure that the rules were kept. Although this was achieved through the licences granted to cable operators, they were usually just the local distributors of national broadcasts, and the Authority's dealings were in practice with those who provided the programme channels. So, for example, Sky Television publicly cited the Cable Authority as its regulator, even though no formal relationship existed between them.

The Authority submitted annual reports to the Home Secretary, which were laid before Parliament and published.
