= Optimum Communications =

American telecommunications and media company; spin-off of Altice Europe

Optimum Communications, Inc.
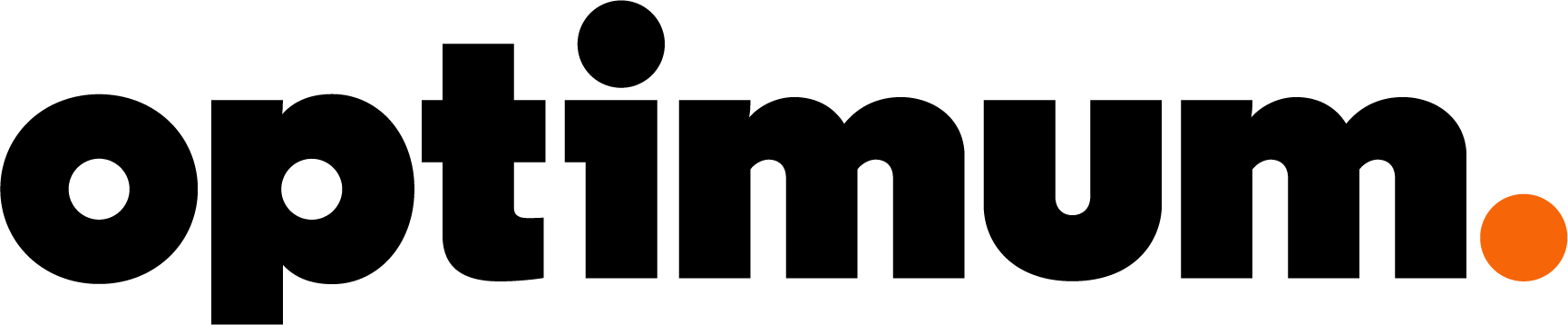

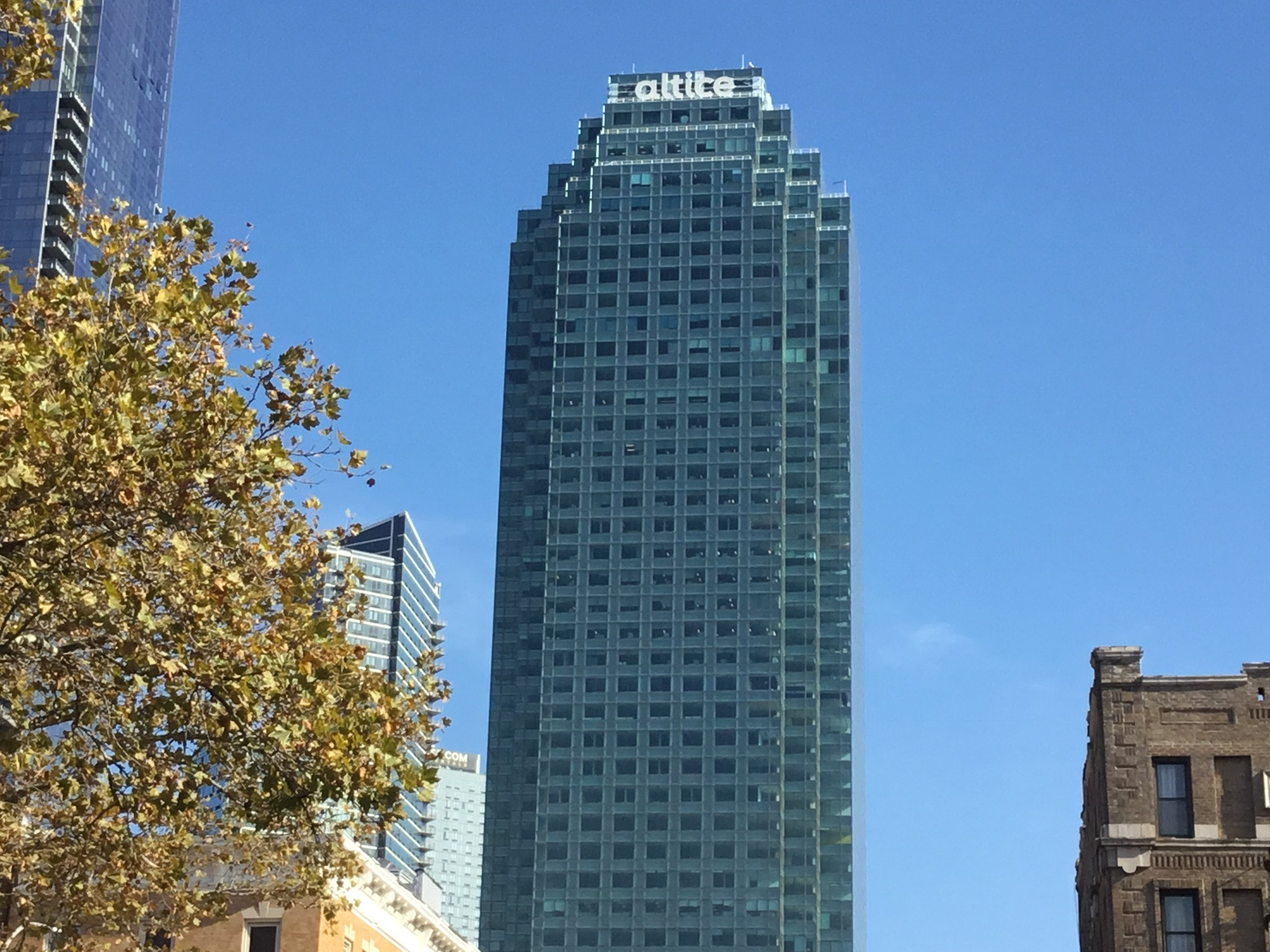
- Optimum Headquarters in Long Island City, Queens
- Type: Public
- Traded as: NYSE: OPTU
- Industry: Telecommunications; Mass media
- Predecessors: Cablevision; Suddenlink Communications
- Founded: June 21, 2016; 10 years ago
- Headquarters: One Court Square; Long Island City, New York, U.S.
- Key people: Patrick Drahi (Controlling Shareholder); Dennis Mathew (chairman & CEO); Marc Sirota (CFO)
- Products: Cable; (Internet); (VoIP Phone); (Business)
- Brands: Optimum; Optimum Business; News 12 Networks; News 12 Varsity; Service Electric
- Revenue: ▼US$8.95 billion (2024)
- Operating income: ▼US$1.68 billion (2024)
- Net income: ▼ −US$103 million (2024)
- Total assets: ▼US$31.7 billion (2024)
- Total equity: ▼ −US$469 million (2024)
- Number of employees: 10,900 (2024)
- Parent: Altice (2016–2018)
- Website: optimum.com

Optimum Communications, Inc. (previously Altice USA) is an American telecommunications provider controlled by French–Israeli businessman Patrick Drahi. The company primarily provides digital cable television and broadband services in the New York metropolitan area as well as in several Midwestern and Southern U.S. states. With approximately 4.9 million residential and business customers in 21 U.S. states as of 2017 it is the fourth-largest telecommunications company in the United States. Optimum is based at One Court Square in Long Island City, Queens, New York City. The company's operational center is located at Cablevision's former headquarters in Bethpage, New York, on Long Island.

The company was formed via the acquisitions of Suddenlink Communications and Cablevision by Drahi's Altice in 2016. In 2017, the subsidiary went public on the New York Stock Exchange, and in 2018 was spun off from Altice as an independent company, although it still remains controlled by Drahi.

The company operates cable television and broadband services under the brand Optimum, which originated from Cablevision; the brand was extended to Suddenlink's systems in 2022, and became Altice USA's corporate name in 2025.

== History ==
On May 20, 2015, Netherlands-based French company Altice NV announced that it would enter the U.S. cable market by purchasing Suddenlink Communications, the country's 7th-largest cable provider, for $9.1 billion. The acquisition closed on December 21, 2015.

On September 17, 2015, Altice NV announced its intention to acquire Cablevision from the Dolan family and other public shareholders for $17.7 billion. The deal was approved by the FCC on May 3, 2016 and after approval from various regional regulators such as New Jersey's Board of Public Utilities and the New York Public Service Commission, closed on June 21, 2016. Under the terms of the deal, Altice paid $34.90 in cash for each share in Cablevision and a 22% premium to the company's stock price; Altice also assumed Cablevision's debt.

In November 2016, Altice USA announced a five-year plan for fiber-to-the-home service to build a network capable of delivering 10 Gbit/s broadband speed. In August 2017, the company stated it was on track to reach one million homes by the end of 2018.

In May 2017, Altice USA announced its intention to rebrand its Suddenlink and Cablevision properties under the Altice name by the end of the second quarter of 2018.

In June 2017, Altice USA went public on the New York Stock Exchange, raising $2.2 billion in its initial public offering.

On January 8, 2018, Altice NV announced that it will spin-off Altice USA into a separate company. Patrick Drahi will maintain control of both companies, although they will be led by separate management teams.

On April 30, 2019, it was announced Altice USA was buying Cheddar for $200 million in cash.

On February 14, 2020, Altice USA announced that it had bought Service Electric in New Jersey. The deal closed in July.

On March 1, 2021, Altice USA announced that it would acquire Morris Broadband in North Carolina for $310 million which was later closed on April 6, 2021. Altice later announced that Morris Broadband would be folded into Optimum. In April 2022, Altice USA announced that Suddenlink would be brought under the Optimum brand as part of its "Let's Reconnect" marketing campaign and FTTH deployments.

On November 6, 2025, Altice USA announced that it would change its name to Optimum Communications effective November 19, unifying it with its service brand.

=== Debt restructuring ===
On October 21, 2026, Optimum announced that it was nearing a restructuring support agreement with plans to sell itself and its assets to its lenders, which include Apollo Global Management, Oaktree Capital Management, and JPMorgan Chase. On October 22, Optimum warned that it was considering filing for Chapter 11 bankruptcy protection within the coming weeks as part of that same restructuring agreement.

On November 2, 2026, Optimum announced that it would be shutting down News 12+ by December 27, 2026.

== Products and services ==
- Optimum Internet, a DOCSIS Internet service that offers speeds up to 940 Mbit/s. As of April 2020, a Fiber-to-the home service has been available to more than half of its service footprint.
  - Subscribers also get access to Optimum Wi-Fi hotspots that are located within its service area. Additionally, they may also connect to hotspots provided by Charter Spectrum, Comcast, and Cox nationwide.
- Optimum Voice, a Voice over IP (VoIP) telephone service
- Optimum TV, a digital cable service
- Optimum Mobile, a wireless network offering unlimited text, talk, and data over a 4G LTE nationwide network;
- Optimum Business, built of the former Lightpath and Suddenlink Business organizations,), a broadband and fiber internet, telephone, and television service for businesses. Optimum Business is currently available in 21 states and serves more than 375,000 businesses.
- Optimum Advantage, a discounted residential internet service for low income households.

=== Other properties ===
- News 12 Networks, a group of cable networks that provide news, weather, traffic and sports to cable subscribers in the New York/New Jersey/Connecticut tri-state area through seven individual 24-hour local news channels and five traffic and weather channels.
- News 12 Varsity, A high school sports network dedicated to providing live games of local varsity games.
- Optimum Media (formerly Audience Partners and a4 Media), a provider of digital advertising solutions, which Altice USA (now Optimum Communications) acquired in March 2017.

== Markets ==
The company provides service in 21 states:

- Arizona
- Arkansas
- California
- Connecticut
- Idaho
- Kansas
- Kentucky
- Louisiana
- Mississippi
- Missouri
- Nevada
- New Jersey
- New Mexico
- New York
- North Carolina
- Ohio
- Oklahoma
- Pennsylvania
- Texas
- Virginia
- West Virginia

== Carriage disputes ==
=== AMC Networks dispute ===
Altice engaged in a carriage dispute with the Dolan family (the former owners of Cablevision). Altice's contract to carry AMC Networks group of channels was to expire on December 31, 2016. On December 28 the two sides reached an agreement, three days before their contract with AMC expired.

=== The Walt Disney Company dispute ===
Altice engaged in a dispute with The Walt Disney Company; the contract to carry the company's channels was set to expire on October 1, 2017.

On October 1, 2017, Disney and Altice reached a last-minute agreement to continue carrying the company's channels; this narrowly averted what would have been a blackout of ABC-owned stations WABC-TV and WPVI-TV, along with the ESPN family of networks and various other channels. As part of the agreement, ESPN Classic was removed from the Altice lineup.

=== Starz dispute ===
On January 1, 2018, Altice dropped Starz, Starz Encore, and all of their channels from its channel lineup. The dispute came after the companies were unable to reach an agreement. The dispute ended on February 13, 2018, after both companies reached a new multi-year agreement.

=== 21st Century Fox dispute ===
On September 22, 2018, 21st Century Fox announced that all of its entertainment and sports channels, including Fox owned-and-operated station WNYW and MyNetworkTV O&O WWOR-TV, would be removed from Altice on October 1 if a new retransmission agreement was not reached by that date.

== See also ==
- List of multiple-system operators
- List of United States telephone companies
