= TV di Fastweb =

Defunct Italian cable and IPTV service

TV di Fastweb was a cable television and IPTV service from Fastweb. Its major features were an HDTV cable service, the Video On Demand services (a total of 17), and an advanced interactive service, all accessed via Videostation, the proprietary decoder box Fastweb gave to its subscribers.

The service ended on 5 November 2012. According to the company, the service (which at its peak had 200,000 subscribers) had never really taken off in a decade of use, and had been overtaken by other video on demand services from Hulu and Sky which were launching in Italy and were available to everyone with an internet connection, regardless of ISP and without requiring a separate box.

== See also ==
- BT Vision
- TalkTalk TV
- YouView
