= Patrick Drahi =

Jewish businessman and billionaire (born 1963)

- פטריק דרהי
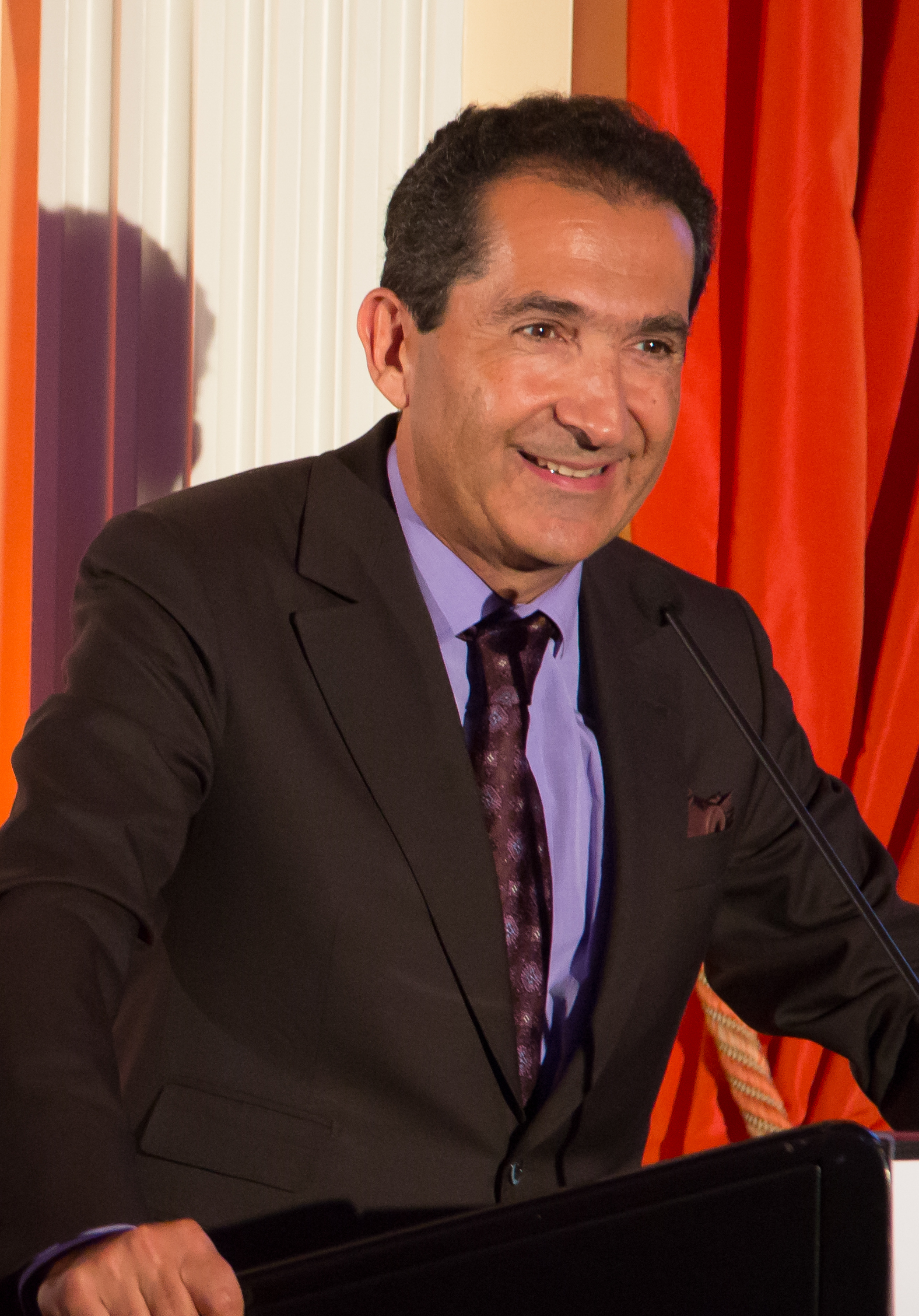
- Drahi in 2015
- Born: 20 August 1963 (age 63); Casablanca, Morocco
- Citizenship: Israeli; French (Note: In 2014, Challenges magazine reported that a legal representative of Drahi had stated that he renounced his French nationality to became an Israeli national. It is unclear when he gave up his French citizenship or when he became an Israeli national. But in 2019 and later he has been described in the press as holding French, Israeli, and Portuguese citizenship.); Portuguese (Note: In 2019 and later he has been described in the press as holding French, Israeli, and Portuguese citizenship.)
- Education: École Polytechnique (Eng); Télécom Paris
- Occupation: Businessman
- Title: Founder and Chairman of Altice and Altice USA
- Spouse: Lina Nazirah Zenie
- Children: 4

Patrick Drahi (French pronunciation: [patʁik dʁai]; Arabic: باتريك دراحي; Hebrew: פטריק דרהי; born 20 August 1963) is a French–Israeli billionaire magnate and investor with interests in media and telecoms. He is the founder and controlling shareholder of the European-based telecom group Altice, and the majority owner of the international auction house Sotheby's. He lives in Israel.

== Early life and education ==
Drahi was born into a Jewish family in Casablanca, Morocco. His parents both taught mathematics. He taught himself to play the piano and was gifted with numbers to the extent that, at age 11, he was helping his parents grade their students’ mathematics exams. When he was 15, the family moved to Montpellier, France. Drahi earned an electrical engineering degree from École Polytechnique in Paris, and a post-graduate degree in optics and electronics from Télécom Paris in 1986.

== Career ==
After completing his postgraduate degree in 1986, Drahi then began work as a fibre optics researcher at Philips. He resigned in 1990 to go into business for himself, initially consulting in the United States on investment in European cable providers. In 1994, in France, he founded Sud Câble Services; he and an American partner convinced mayors in southern France to allow them to lay cable for television in their towns. In 1998 he sold the company to John C. Malone's UPC. Drahi was paid in UPC stock and went to Geneva to work for the company. He sold his position in UPC for approximately €40 million just before the dot-com bubble burst.

In 2001, he founded the Amsterdam-based holding company Altice ATCE.AS, which soon began to buy up European cable companies. In France, he founded the French cable operator Numericable and in 2013 bought SFR, the second largest mobile phone and internet provider in the country, from media conglomerate Vivendi. In the UK, he bought 18% of the telecom BT in 2021 and in 2023 increased his stake to 24.5%.

Drahi owns the Israeli cable television company HOT. In 2013 he founded the Israel-based international news channel i24news, which broadcasts in French, Arabic, and English.

Altice entered the American Telecommunications market in 2015 by purchasing 70% of Suddenlink Communications, the seventh-largest cable company in the US. Later in 2015, Drahi bought Cablevision from the Dolan family, renaming it Altice USA with its flagship brand Optimum being the fifth largest cable operator in the USA. In 2018, the Dolans sued Altice USA over alleged violations of the terms of the sale.

In September 2020, to take the company private, Drahi offered €2.5 billion to minority shareholders of Altice. An increased bid was accepted in January 2021.

In June 2019, Sotheby's announced it was being acquired by Drahi at a 61% market premium. To cut debts and fund growth, in 2024 Drahi sold a $1bn stake to ADQ.

=== Forbes ranking ===
In June 2015, Forbes estimated Drahi's net worth at US$26.5 billion and ranked him as the 56th richest person in the world and the third richest in France. He was ranked as the richest person in Israel until 2016, when he came in second. As of 2026, Bloomberg Billionaires Index and Forbes estimates his net worth at approximately US$8.6 billion, ranking him among wealthiest in the world.

On 15 March 2024, Drahi announced the sale of Altice Média to Rodolphe Saadé for just over €1.5 billion, in order to pay off some of the parent company's debt, estimated at €24 billion at the end of September 2023.

== Personal life ==
Drahi married Lina Nazirah (née Zenie), a Greek Orthodox Syrian naturalized in Switzerland, in 1990. They moved to Switzerland in 1999 and lived in Geneva. They have four children: Graziella, who was Vice President–Growth at Altice USA, Angélina, who chairs the family's charity foundation, and twin sons David, who joined the board of directors of Altice USA in 2019, and Nathan, who formerly worked in London in private equity and was appointed Managing Director of Sotheby's Asia in 2021.

In 2014, Drahi and his wife Lina created their family foundation, the Patrick and Lina Drahi Foundation, to support innovative programmes in the areas of science and education, entrepreneurship and innovation, the arts, and Israel and the Jewish people, through organizational grants. Incorporated in 2016 and headquartered in Zermatt, Switzerland, the foundation supports programmes in Switzerland, France and Portugal.

In 2014, Drahi's lawyer informed the magazine Challenges, who intended to include him in a list of France's top 500 fortunes, that he had given up his French citizenship and taken Israeli citizenship. But he reportedly acquired Portuguese citizenship in 2015, and has since been described as a citizen of all three countries.

In 2024 he moved to Tel Aviv, Israel.
