= Alain Weill =

French business executive (born 1961)

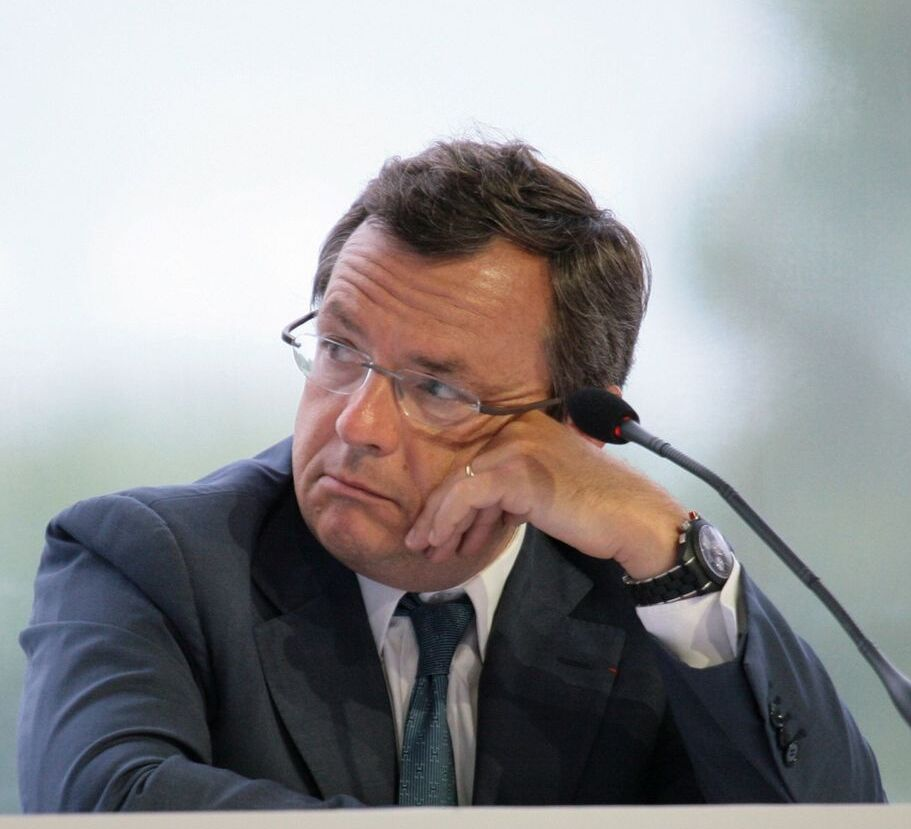
- Born: 6 April 1961 (age 65); Strasbourg, France
- Education: HEC Paris (MBA)
- Occupations: CEO NextRadioTV, Chairman and CEO of SFR

Alain Weill (born 6 April 1961) is a French business executive. He is the founder, chairman of the board and chief executive officer of NextRadioTV (which includes BFM TV and Radio Monte Carlo) and Chairman and CEO of SFR Group.

== Early life ==
Alain Weill was born on 6 April 1961 in Strasbourg, France. He received a degree in economics and an MBA from HEC Paris.

== Career ==
In 1985, Weill started his career at NRJ, and later became CEO of Quarare, a subsidiary of Sodexo. In 1990, he served as executive assistant to the CEO of Compagnie Luxembourgeoise de Télédiffusion (CLT), and later chairman and chief executive officer. He became CEO of the NRJ Group in 1992, and of NRJ Régies in 1995. In 1997, he became deputy chairman of the management board.

He founded Nextradio in 2000 and took over RMC radio. He oversaw the acquisition of BFM (now BFM Business) in 2002, and the launch of news channel BFM TV in 2005.

In 2010, he sold 80% of La Tribune to Valérie Decamp for €1 and he still owns 20%.

Weill was appointed CEO of SFR Media in May 2016, and in November 2017 became chairman and CEO of SFR Group, as well as COO of Altice Media.

He has served as Chairman of the Syndicat indépendant des régies de radios privés (SIRRP) since 1998. He serves on the Board of Directors of Iliad.
