= Fred & Farid Group =

American advertising company

FF
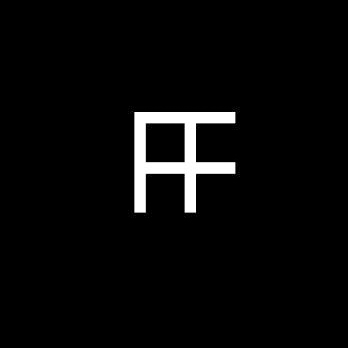
- Company type: Private
- Industry: Advertising
- Founded: January 9, 2007; 19 years ago
- Headquarters: Los Angeles, United States
- Number of locations: 4: Los Angeles, New York City, Shanghai, Paris
- Area served: Global
- Key people: Frédéric Raillard, Farid Mokart
- Number of employees: 150
- Website: www.ffcreative.com

== FF Agency ==
FF is an independent international boutique network (Advertising firm) with offices Los Angeles, New York, Shanghai and Paris founded by Fred Raillard and Farid Mokart in 2007. It employs around 300 people.

Fred & Farid also provides investments via Fred & Farid Digital Investment Fund (FFDIF)

Raillard and Mokart had worked as partners beginning in 2000. In 2007 they launched their own independent company.

== History ==
Frederic Raillard and Farid Mokart were both raised in the Paris suburbs, Raillard from a Breton and a Parisian family, Mokart from an Algerian and Kabyle family. After studying respectively design and political science (Sciences Po), Raillard and Mokart started as strategic planner and account manager at Euro RSCG BTC in Paris. They decided to team up and moved to the creative side, working consecutively for 6 major agencies in Paris as creative directors.

Their first project was for start-up Aucland.com, a French online auction site. In 2000, Fred & Farid created the musical video for British Pop Star Robbie Williams "Rock DJ".

FF (formerly Fred & Farid) is an independent creative agency of 100+ people. They produced campaigns for brands like Air France, Audemars Piguet, Audi, Coca-Cola, Diesel, Giorgio Armani, Google, Guerlain, HP, Lacoste, Louis XIII, Martini, Orangina, Porsche, Saint Laurent, Schweppes, Societe Generale, Tmall, Vivo, Wrangler.
