= Optimum (brand) =

American cable provider

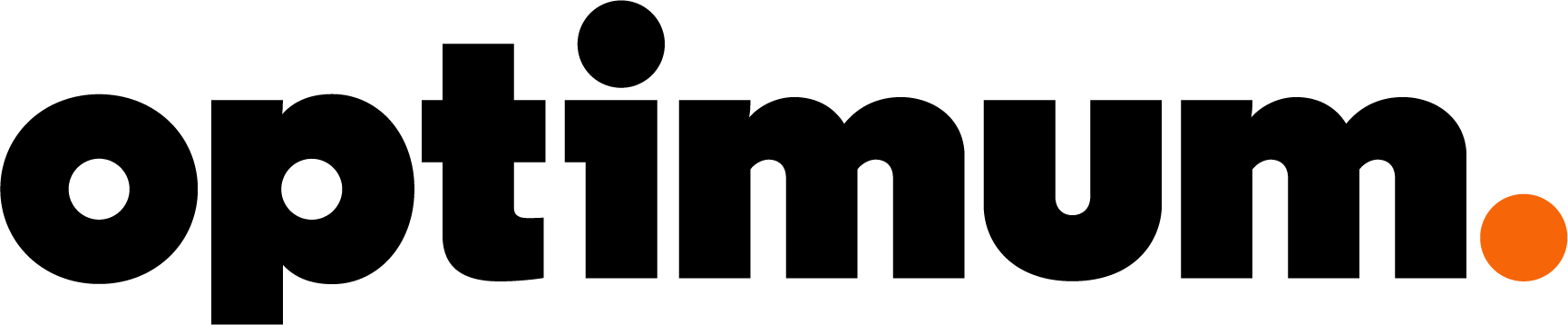
- Product type: Digital cable; Internet; Mobile phone; VoIP phone
- Current owner: Optimum Communications, Inc.
- Country: United States
- Introduced: 1996
- Website: optimum.com

Optimum is an American telecommunications brand owned and operated by Optimum Communications, formerly Altice USA. It is the fourth-largest cable provider in the United States. Optimum offers Internet, television, mobile and home phone services in 21 states.

== Overview ==
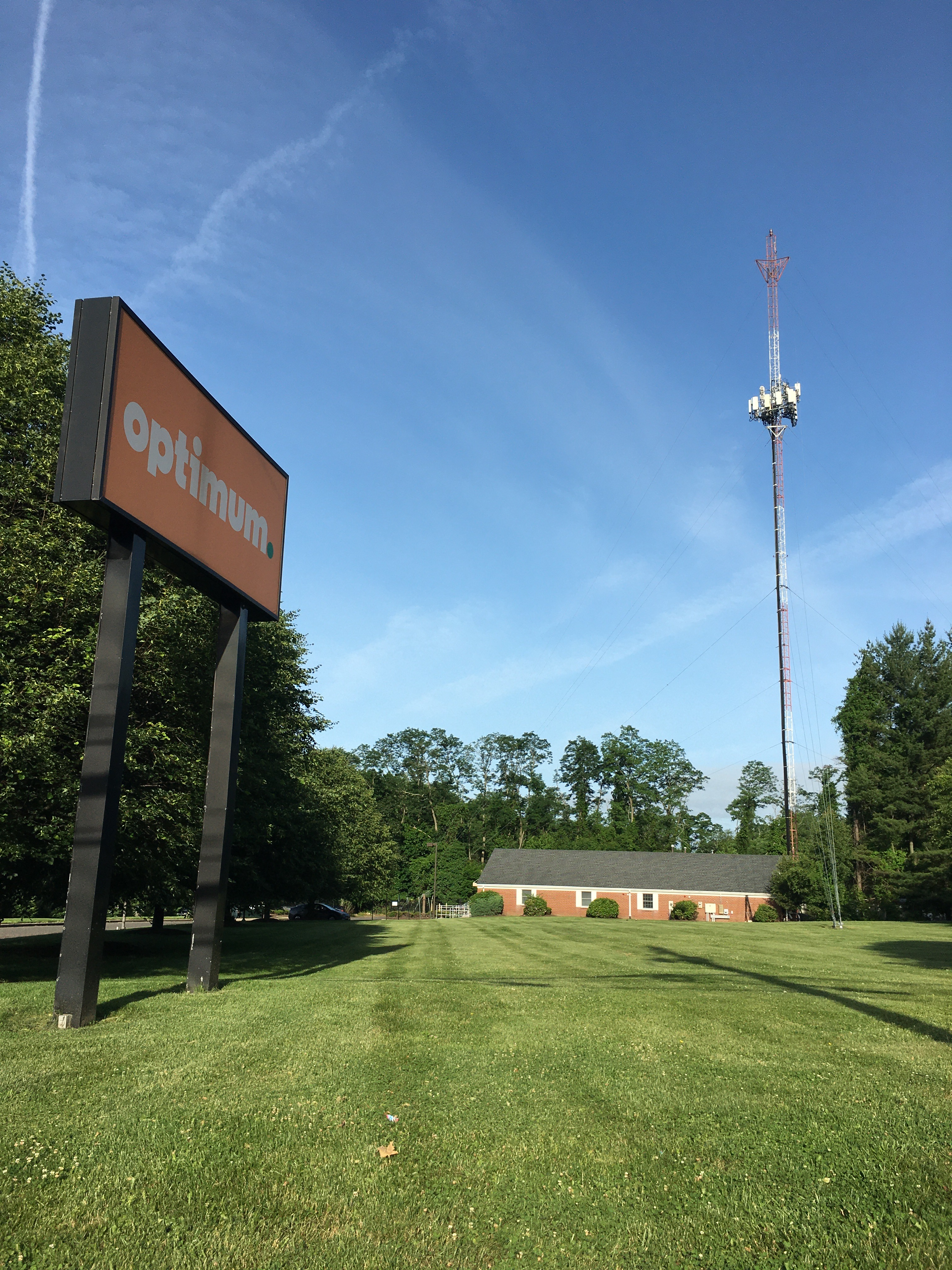
This Optimum customer service facility in Freehold Township, New Jersey, has existed during both the Cablevision and Altice eras

Introduced in 2018 on Long Island and then extended through its service area, Optimum One is the company's flagship home entertainment platform, and combines broadband internet access, television, VOIP telephone service, and various streaming applications. An assessment in 2021 from the Digital Trends site said that the strength of Optimum One was its centralizing of internet connection, WiFi access point, and streaming in one device, whereas its weakness was the need for Optimum One Mini devices that extend the WiFi signal around a home.

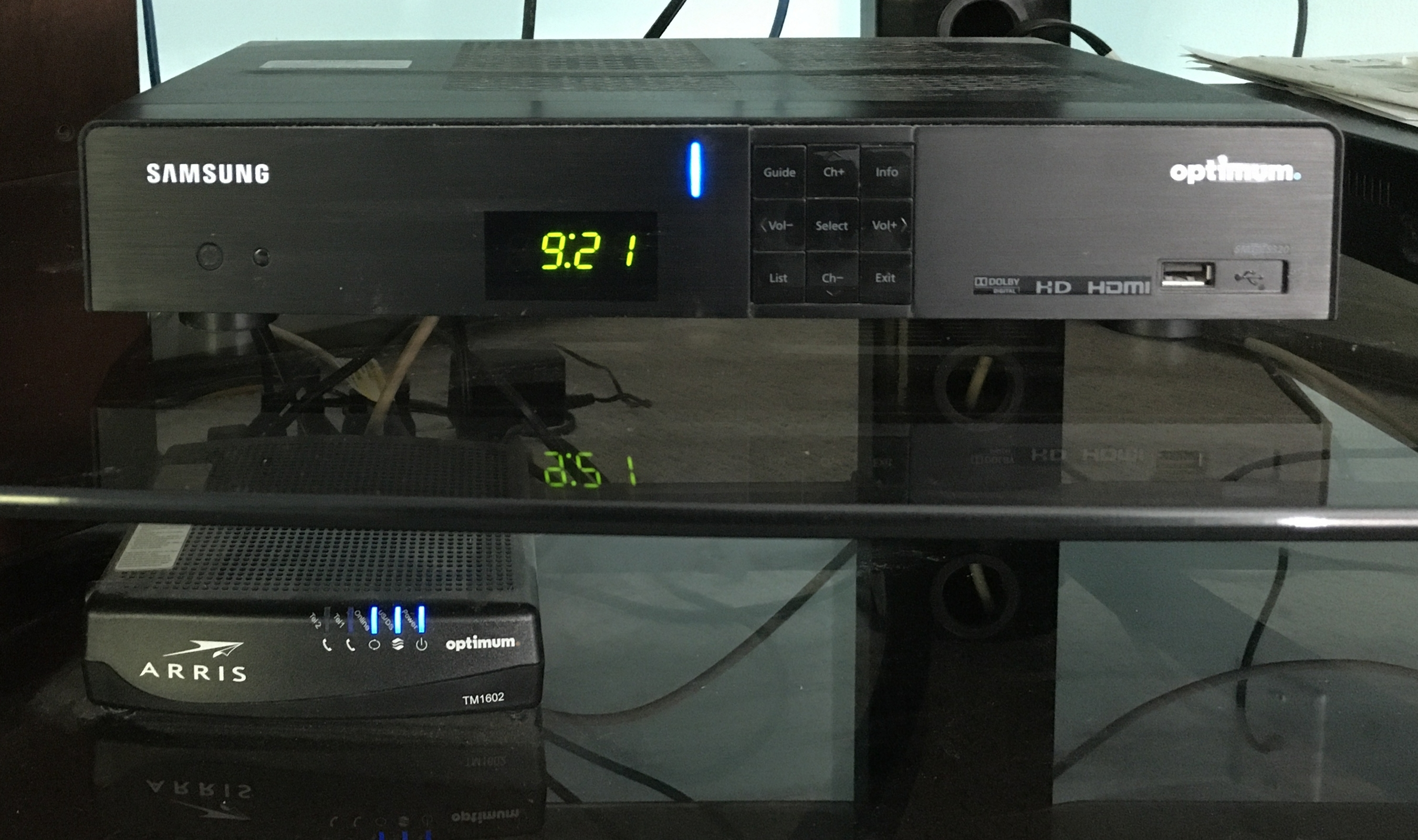
Optimum HD cable box (top) and cable modem, in place and connected

Optimum TV offers cable television service in several tiers, the names of which have changed over time. Optimum offers broadband internet service, similarly with several tiers available. The company also offers a low-cost broadband option, Optimum Advantage Internet. Optimum offers landline VOIP telephone service branded as Optimum Voice; the service utilizes a telephony-capable cable modem to provide the service, either alone or combined into a household's main cable modem box.

Optimum provides small and mid-sized businesses with Internet, telephone, television, mobile, WiFi, and advertising services.

== History ==
Optimum began as a "30-channel system built in the 1970s" using "copper cable" technology. Modernizations and expansions of their services included "a fiber optic network" and more channels, with an expanded set of offerings. As of 2020, the name is still used.

The original Optimum pre-digital technology was limited in the number of channels it could carry. The trademark (styled as OPTIMUM) was "first in use in commerce in August 1994".

Optimum logo used from 2004 until 2012

=== Optimum as a Cablevision offering ===
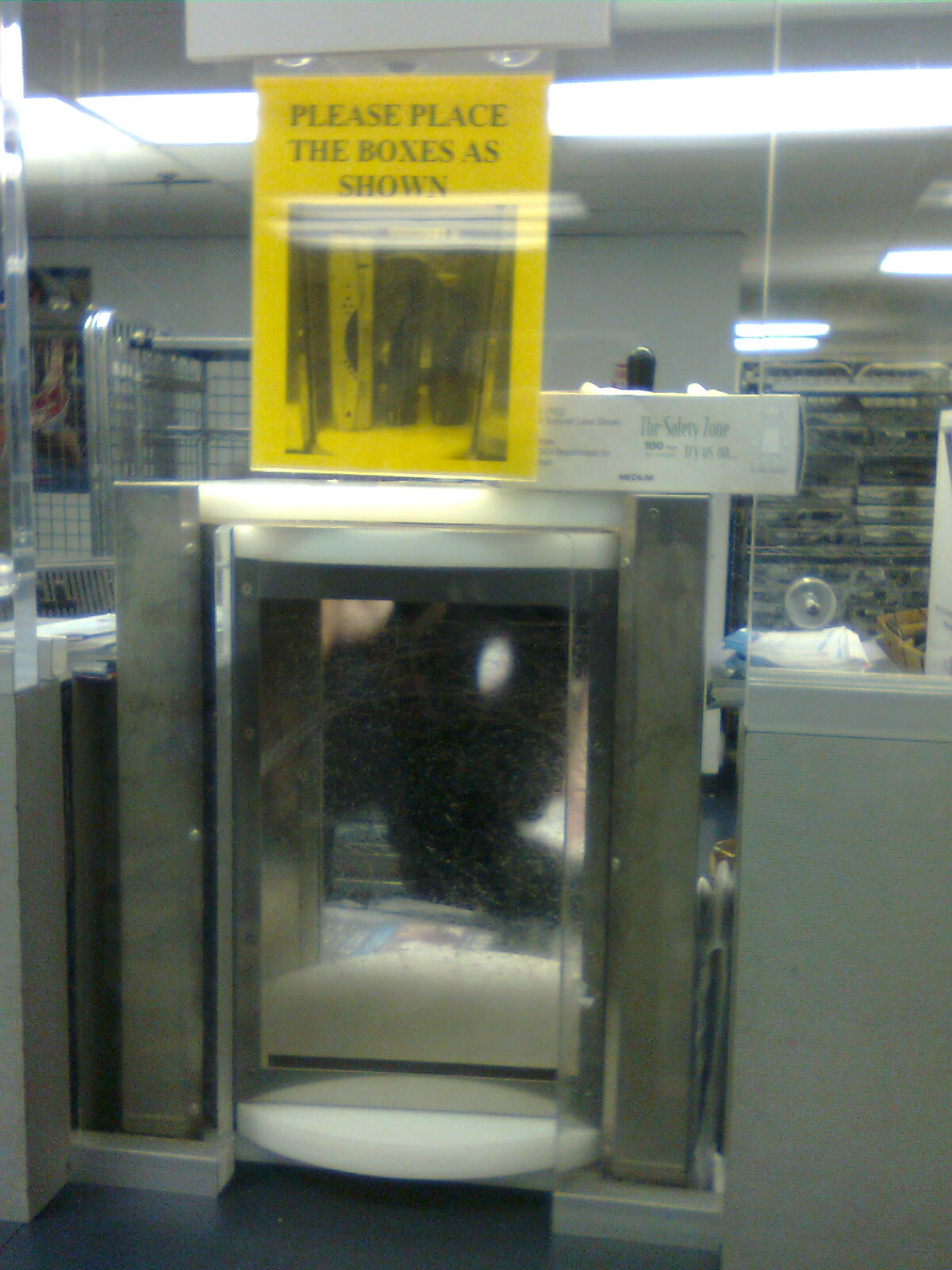
Cablevision Optimum equipment return facility in Brooklyn, New York

Following Optimum being acquired by Cablevision, the brand Optimum TV was used to market a more expensive offering with more channels. By 2004 the name Optimum Voice was used to offer "a new phone service" based on cable-modem technology. Like competing offerings from AT&T, "it stops working altogether if the power goes out".

The Optimum name was also used to offer Cable-based Internet access; Optimum also pioneered in optionally bundling this with TV access, using "streaming" technology. In what was termed "digital service" Interactive Optimum was not first, but was early in steering the introduction of video-on-demand, alternate camera views for sporting events, and VCR-like rewind and replay. Optimum Select was a related offering, "in which viewers could click on their remote controls to receive more information". Similarly, regarding Optimum's branding and HBO Now, writes the New York Times, "Cablevision’s Internet subscribers can order the service on the company’s website, Optimum.net .., or by calling."

Although references such as "Cablevision's Optimum" do not include the Altice name, both names reflect major market share: one study showed Optimum Voice as the eight-largest phone service provider in the U.S. The name's value was used for about two years when an acquisition held June 2010 through February 2013 was named Optimum West.

==== Interactive Optimum (iO) ====
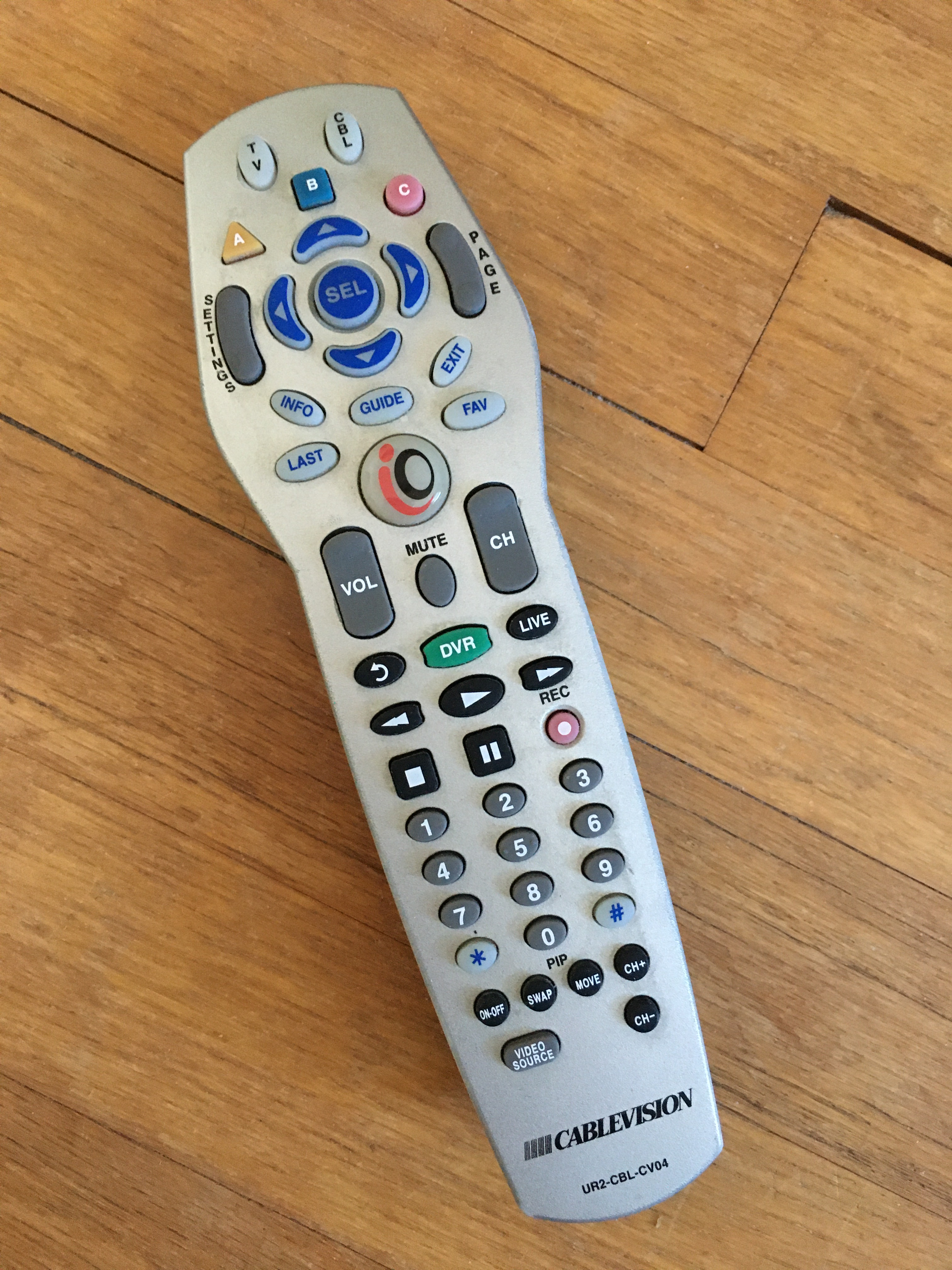
Cablevision remote with a large "iO" button in the middle

In late 2001, Interactive Optimum (iO Digital Cable Service) combined "telephone, Internet, entertainment" with "60 channels of digital music and 20 channels of topics like antique car collecting, vegetarian cooking or wedding planning'. The New York Times described other cable companies in 2002 as having offered "merely a way of improving television reception". By 2004, there were 15 competitors, but the entire subscribing customer base for what others called "Interactive TV" was described as "still rare". Advertising Age reported that "several high-profile ventures that had their plug pulled for troublesome economic or technological reasons".

Even so, by "playing catch-up" iO and the rest of the company's offerings increased customer count from 689,000 (2004) to over 3 million (2016).

=== Altice USA ===
Altice bought Cablevision, the Optimum brand included, for $17.7 billion in June 2016. Cablevision was combined with Suddenlink Communications to create Altice USA, the fourth largest operator in the United States.

On March 1, 2021, Altice USA announced that it would acquire Morris Broadband in North Carolina for $310 million which was later closed on April 6, 2021. Altice later announced that Morris Broadband would be rebranded into the Optimum name, making it the first time since 2011 when under its predecessor, Cablevision, in which Optimum had systems outside of the New York area.

In April 2022, Altice USA announced that SuddenLink was to be rebranded into Optimum. Because of this, Optimum will automatically expand its footprint to eleven additional states, in addition to expanding in North Carolina with its previous acquisition with Morris Broadband. The rebranding was later completed by August 1, 2022.

On November 6, 2025, Altice USA announced that it would change its corporate name to Optimum Communications effective November 19, unifying it with its service brand.

== Conflicts ==
A New Jersey company that named itself "Optimum Networks Inc." was sued by then-owner Cablevision Systems Corporation (CSC) for violation of the OPTIMUM trademark in 2010.

Optimum customers lost access to NY1 on June 30, 2025.

== See also ==
- List of multiple-system operators
