= Altice =

Luxembourg-based multinational telecommunications and mass media company

Altice Group Lux Sàrl
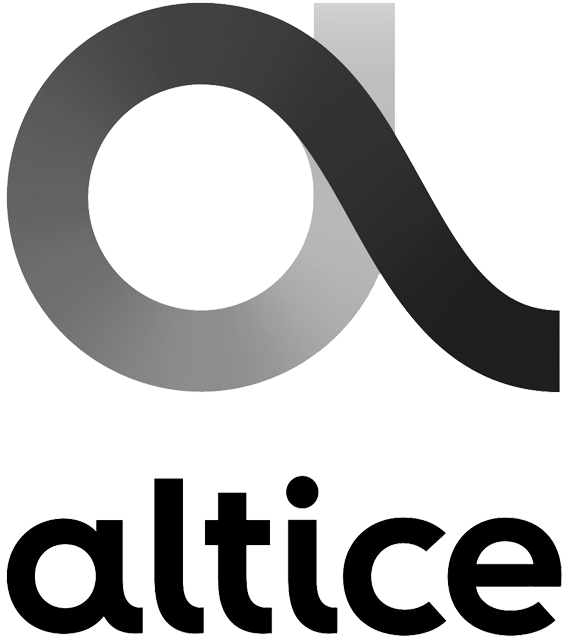
- Type: Private
- Industry: Telecommunications; Mass media
- Founded: 2001; 25 years ago
- Founder: Patrick Drahi
- Headquarters: Luxembourg City, Luxembourg
- Area served: Worldwide
- Key people: Patrick Drahi (chairman); Alain Weill (CEO)
- Products: Cable television, Direct-broadcast satellite, broadcasting, broadband and telephony services, mass media
- Revenue: €2.54 billion (2017)
- Operating income: €2.845 billion (2017)
- Net income: €179.3 million (2017)
- Total assets: €88.39 million (2017)
- Total equity: €30.00 million (2017)
- Owner: Patrick Drahi (controlling shareholder)
- Number of employees: 47,143 (2018)
- Subsidiaries: Altice Dominicana; Altice France; Altice Portugal; Hot
- Website: www.altice.net

Altice Group Lux Sàrl (formerly Altice Europe N.V. and commonly known as Altice) is a Luxembourg-based multinational telecommunications and mass media company with official headquarters in Luxembourg, founded and headed by the French-Israeli billionaire businessman Patrick Drahi, and the second largest telecoms company in France, behind Orange.

It had a market capitalization of €13.7 billion in December 2017, and a market cap of less than €6 billion in June 2019, a 56% decline for the stock since Drahi financed the business with debt. In 2016, the company had over 50 million internet, TV, and phone customers in Western Europe, Israel, the United States (where it formerly operated) and the Caribbean. Altice formerly owned a subsidiary in the USA until that company, while retaining the Altice name, was spun off through an IPO in June 2019, making the former USA division independent from the rest of Altice but retaining the same chairman, Patrick Drahi, and the same logo.

== History ==
=== 2000s ===
Altice bought several regional cable television operators in France from 2002 to 2007, merging them under the brand Numericable.

In 2009, Patrick Drahi increased his stake in Hot, a cable television operator in Israel.

=== 2010s ===
Drahi completed the takeover in 2011, and offered to buy the remaining shares in 2012.

In November 2013, Orange announced it was selling Orange Dominicana to Altice for $1.4 billion.

In March 2014, it acquired SFR, France's second-largest mobile phone and Internet services company, from Vivendi.

In November 2014, France's competition watchdog approved a deal for Numericable to acquire Virgin Mobile France for €325 million.

In May 2015, Altice acquired a 70% controlling stake in Suddenlink Communications, which valued the seventh-largest US cable company at US$9.1 billion. The other 30% continues to be owned by BC Partners and CPP Investment Board.

In May 2015, Altice was said to be launching a bid for Time Warner Cable, which has a US$45 billion market capitalization, following a failed bid by Comcast. It was instead acquired by Charter Communications.

In June 2015 Altice acquired Portugal Telecom and sold Cabovisão to Apax France (later Seven2).

In June 2015, it was reported that Altice had offered €10 billion for Bouygues Telecom, the third largest telecoms company in France. Bouygues' board refused and as of March 2016, is considering merging with Orange.

On 17 September 2015, it was announced that Altice would acquire Cablevision, a Bethpage, Long Island based cable provider for US$17.7 billion, including debt.

In October 2015, it was announced that backing the Altice purchase of Cablevision, were private equity firm BC Partners and CPPIB.

In December 2016, Altice announced its deal to sell SFR Belux to Telenet for €400 million.

In March 2017, Altice acquired video ad tech firm Teads for US$307 million. The company filed for IPO in July 2021.

In May 2017, Altice and Altice USA unveiled a new logo and slogan, "Together Has No Limits", and announced that it would unify all of its telecom holdings under the singular Altice brand by mid-2018.

Altice split from Altice USA in 2018.

=== 2020s ===
In September 2020, Drahi put on an offer of €2.5 billion to buy minority shareholders of Altice Europe and secure control of the company. An increased bid was accepted in January 2021, and the company delisted from the Euronext stock exchange.

In June 2021, Altice acquired 12% of BT.

In December 2021, Altice acquired a further 6% stake in BT taking the total ownership to 18%.

In August 2024, Altice sold its 24.5% stake in the British group British Telecom to the Indian telecom company Bharti Airtel. The total value of the transaction amounted to 3.5 billion euros.

In June 2025, Altice France filed for Chapter 15 bankruptcy protection, weeks after it also entered safeguard proceedings in France.

== Criticism ==
=== Involvement in Israeli settlements ===
On 12 February 2020, the United Nations published a database of all business enterprises involved in certain specified activities related to the Israeli settlements in the Occupied Palestinian Territories, including East Jerusalem, and in the occupied Golan Heights. Altice has been listed on the database in light of its involvement in activities related to "the provision of services and utilities supporting the maintenance and existence of settlements". Israeli settlements built on land occupied by Israel are in violation of international law.

On 5 July 2021, Norway's largest pension fund KLP said it would divest from Altice together with 15 other business entities implicated in the UN report for their links to Israeli settlements in the occupied West Bank.

== See also ==
- Altice Dominicana S.A.
- Altice Portugal
- Altice USA
