= Sotheby =

Sotheby is a surname, and may refer to:

- Admiral Sir Edward Southwell Sotheby (1813–1902), Royal Navy officer
- John Sotheby (1740–1807), English auctioneer and founder of Sotheby's
- Samuel Sotheby (1771–1842), English auctioneer and antiquarian
- Samuel Leigh Sotheby (1805–1861), English auctioneer and antiquarian, son of Samuel Sotheby (1771–1842)
- William Sotheby (1757–1833), English poet and translator

== See also ==
- Sotheby's, art and auction corporation named for John Sotheby
