= Cecily Brown =

British painter

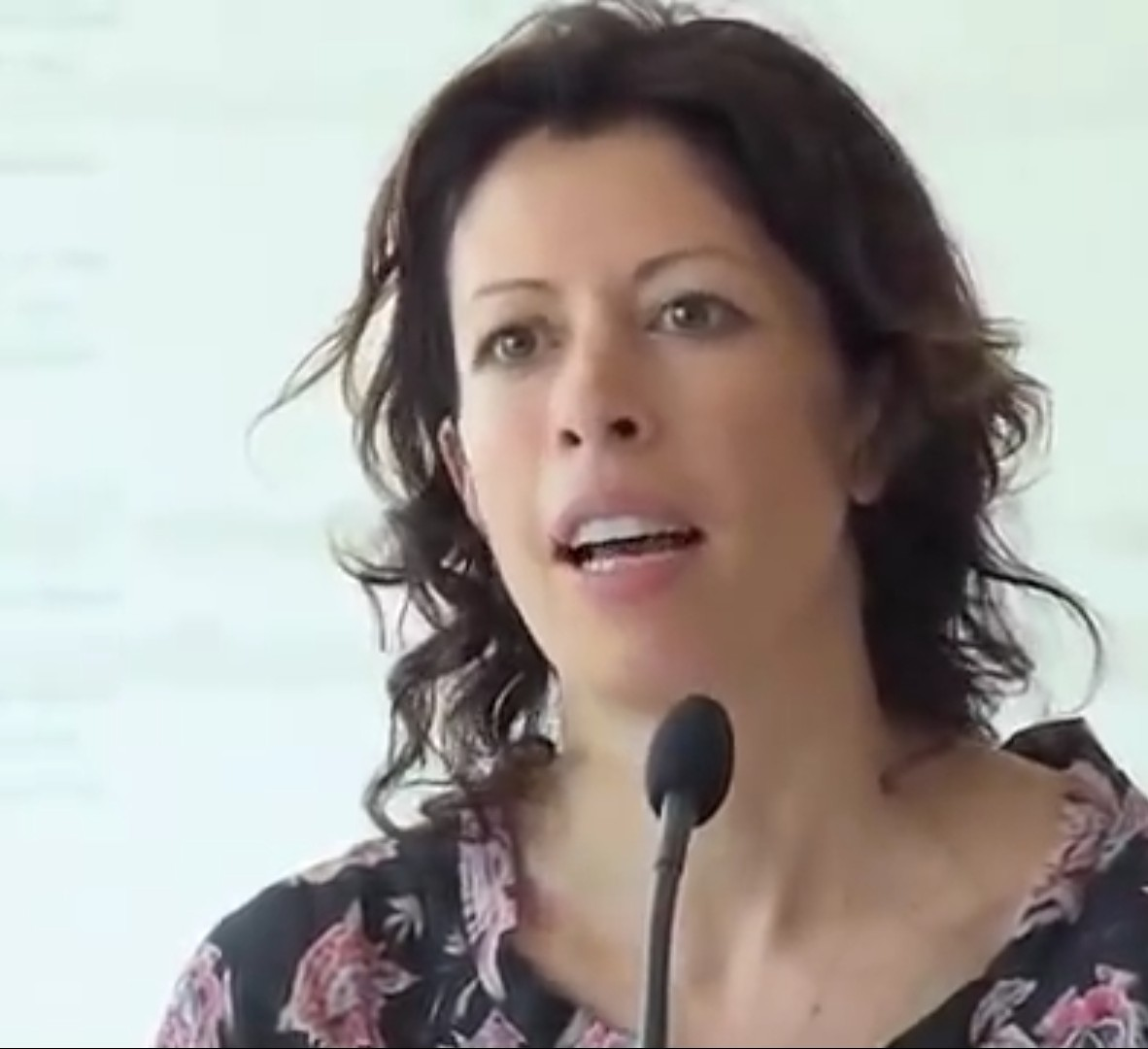
- Cecily Brown, 2012
- Born: 1969 (age 56–57); London, England
- Education: Epsom School of Art (1987); Morley College (1987–89); Slade School of Art (1993)
- Style: Figurative art Abstract art
- Spouse: Nicolai Ouroussoff

Cecily Brown (born 1969) is a British painter. Her style displays the influence of a variety of contemporary painters, from Willem de Kooning, Francis Bacon and Joan Mitchell, to Old Masters like Rubens, Poussin and Goya. Brown lives and works in New York.

== Personal life ==
Brown was born to novelist Shena Mackay and art critic David Sylvester and raised in England. Prior to her 1994 move to New York City, Brown resided in New York as an exchange student from the Slade School of Art in 1992. From the age of three Brown wanted to be an artist; she was supported in this ambition by her family, notably by her grandmother and two of her uncles who were also artists. Brown is married to architecture critic Nicolai Ouroussoff; they have one daughter.

Since 2014, Brown has been serving on the board of directors of the Foundation for Contemporary Arts (FCA).

== Education ==
Brown went to Surbiton High School in Surrey, before studying at the Epsom School of Art, Surrey, England (1985–87) (now part of the University for the Creative Arts), then taking drawing and printmaking classes at Morley College, London (1987–89), and finally receiving first class honours on a BA degree in Fine Arts course at the Slade School of Art, London (1989–93). During her studies she studied for a semester abroad in New York City. Awards include being the first-prize recipient in the National Competition for British Art Students.

== Career ==
Brown left London for New York City in 1994, inspired by her time studying there in university. In New York, she was offered a solo exhibition by Jeffrey Deitch at Deitch Projects. Spectacle (1997), her first exhibition consisting of six erotic paintings of colorful bunny rabbits, was the first group of paintings shown at Deitch Projects. Here, her work was purchased by Charles Saatchi, which “launched her career into stardom.” In 1995, the art world took notice of her work when she displayed Four Letter Heaven at the Telluride Film Festival; it was shown in the United States as well as Europe. The films consist of sexual and pornographic themes, which she explores in the majority of her work. In 2000, she was photographed for Vanity Fair lying in front of one of her paintings, wearing a T-shirt emblazoned with a dollar sign. Brown's participation in photoshoots like this were scrutinized, with the criticism being that she was “exploiting her looks” for popularity, which took away from her art.

Brown now lives and works in New York City, and has had dozens of exhibitions in both the United States and in England since moving in 1994. In 2023, the Metropolitan Museum of Art held Cecily Brown: Death and the Maid, which was “the first full-breadth museum survey in New York” of Brown's career. Brown maintained a studio in the Meatpacking District of Manhattan, then in 2011, she worked from a studio at a former office near Union Square.

== Work ==
=== Style, influences ===
Brown began exhibiting as a painter in the 1990s, at a time where painting had been uncommon in the art world in favor of multimedia, sculptural, and conceptual performance art. Her particular style of painting is largely inspired by figurative expressionism of artists like Francis Bacon and New York Abstract Expressionists like Willem de Kooning and Arshile Gorky. This influence can be seen in her busy paintings with visible, gestural brushstrokes, as well as in her process, where she describes her relationship with the art as the artist to be more that she is performing the act of painting, and the canvas is “a record of [Brown's] movements”. Brown has minimal anxiety about the art media she uses; she said in an interview with Lari Pittman that "As someone who works with traditional materials, I've always had little anxiety that the medium isn't contemporary enough, that the work could have been made at almost any time."

=== Painting ===
Service de Luxe (1999) at the Rubell Museum DC in 2022

Brown uses drawing as a prerequisite to guide her work. Through the use of repetition, Brown captures images that both attract and confound her. Though her drawings are not as exhibited as her paintings, both art mediums contain similar aspects in showcasing her erotic view of art through subject matter. Brown states, “I want to make forms that are either just dissolving or in the process of just becoming something and to play with the relationship between the eye and the brain.”

Brown's paintings combine figuration and utter abstraction while exploring the power relationship between male and female. Expanding the tradition of abstract expressionism, she has become known for a painting style suggestive of abstract and abstract expressionist painters such as Willem de Kooning and Oskar Kokoschka. In her interview with Pittman she discussed how she defines 'sexy' and 'sexual' in her work: "I suppose you could say that the sexual is in every painting, whether there is an overt subject or not. The tension within the painting, whatever the subject, is the desired outcome. The sexy would be the girl's lipstick smile or the shoe--the physical object from the three-dimensional world placed within the painting." When she begins a painting, she generally doesn't have an exact idea of what she is trying to achieve, but she lets the final painting reveal itself as she works. Whilst painting she likes to let the paintings develop and change drastically, because she believes the surprise makes her work more interesting. Brown says, "All the paintings I'm working on have more or less the same impetus; the same thoughts are driving them. I like there to be an argument within a painting." Sexuality and attraction are important themes in her work, which she explores through semi-figurative and abstract means. The way she handles paint within her work, becomes the subject matter itself by engulfing her figures within the paint or to use it to add a sense of humor to her sexual imagery. The main characteristic of Brown's paintings is her use of motion, expressive mark-making and many mixtures of color throughout her pieces. She also constantly changes palettes, so her work consistently shifts over time. Her paintings also recall the works of Philip Guston and the Bay Area Figurative School of the 1950s and 1960s. Brown often titles her paintings after classic Hollywood films and musicals, such as The Pyjama Game, The Bedtime Story and The Fugitive Kind. Brown said in an interview that "One of the main things I would like my work to do is to reveal itself slowly, continuously and for you never to feel that you're really finished looking at something." She also said in another interview that she asks herself as she works, "How can I paint the equivalent of what it's like to move through space, to move through the world, to be in a room, in a park, on the street?" In 2013, Brown based a series of paintings on a photograph of a large group of nude women that appeared on the British release of a 1968 Jimi Hendrix album Electric Ladyland.

The sexuality and eroticism of Brown's depictions of expressive figures and nudes are echoed in rich colours, luscious paint handling, and animated brushwork; her work combines representational and abstract elements. In her interview with Lari Pittman she discussed how she defines 'sexy' and 'sexual' in her work. Brown said, "I suppose you could say that the sexual is in every painting, whether there is an overt subject or not. The tension within the painting, whatever the subject, is the desired outcome. The sexy would be the girl's lipstick smile or the shoe--the physical object from the three-dimensional world placed within the painting." Her tactile technique stands out among contemporaries and links her to the art movement Abstract Expressionism. However, self-conscious of her connection with artists such as Willem de Kooning and Lucian Freud, Brown often interjects fresh humor or irony by titling her paintings after famous musicals and films. She has been grouped with leading female contemporary painters, including Charline von Heyl, Jacqueline Humphries, Laura Owens, Jutta Koether, Amy Sillman, and Emily Sundblad.

Cecily Brown works using a non-linear approach. Brown experiments with this approach by working with multiple canvases at one time. Working in large groups allows Brown to explore new compositional ideas while continually being spontaneous. Brown describes her process as "organic". She often spends multiple days on works, and will work on up to 20 works at a time, allowing layers of paint to dry between applications.

In 1997, Brown created Untitled, a permanent, site-specific installation for the group exhibition Vertical Paintings at the P.S. 1 Contemporary Arts Center (now MoMA PS1).

=== In the media ===
In the February 2000 edition of Vanity Fair, Brown, along with fellow artists Inka Essenhigh, John Currin and others, appeared in photographs taken by Todd Eberle. A photograph that appeared in The New Yorker showed Brown from the back as she stood, cigarette in hand, studying one of her paintings.

Brown presided in 2004, along with other artists such as Laura Owens and Elizabeth Peyton, over a Democratic Party fund-raising event, Art Works for Hard Money, in Los Angeles.

=== Charity work ===
In 2020 Brown donated her work Wanton Boy to amfAR, The Foundation for AIDS Research, to help fund their temporary COVID-19 research initiative. The painting sold for $250,000 in a virtual auction conducted in July by Christie's, which also included donated works from artists such as Eddie Martinez and Dana Schutz.

== Critical reception ==
Brown has received a lot of critical attention for powerful, athletically sized canvases and bold brushwork. The assertiveness of her paintings has often been compared to Abstract Expressionist works which, during their time, were linked to a fierce masculinity. As a female artist working in this vein, Brown's works have been seen as confronting both this tradition and gendered assumptions about art.

However, some recent critics have taken a different stance. In a 2011 review for The Guardian, art critic Adrian Searle rejected the dynamic and assertive surfaces of Brown's art and wrote: "What's really missing in her art is character, and for all the hectic painting, a sense of necessity." Likewise, in 2013, Leah Ollman wrote a review of a Gagosian Gallery show for The LA Times, in which she observed: "Instead of powerful and passionate, her voice comes across as detached. The volume is turned up, but the verve is on low." Roberta Smith, in The New York Times, called a Gagosian exhibition it reviewed in 2000 "lackluster" and suggested that Brown's "career is ahead of her artistic development." Smith subsequently wrote a largely positive review of Brown's work in an article titled "I Was Wrong About Cecily Brown".

== Art market ==
Cecily set an early auction record when her oil painting Sick Leaves sold for 2.2 million dollars at a Christie's auction in March 2017. Shortly after, Suddenly Last Summer (1999), originally estimated at $1.8 to $2.5 million, fetched $6.8 million at a 2018 Sotheby's auction in New York. In November 2025, High Society (1997) sold at Sotheby's in New York, under the gavel of Phyllis Kao, for $9.8 million.

== Exhibitions ==
Brown has staged many solo shows and exhibitions in the United States, United Kingdom, and internationally. Her notable solo shows include Spectacle (1997), Deitch Projects, New York; Directions - Cecily Brown (2002), Hirshhorn Museum and Sculpture Garden, Washington, D.C.; Cecily Brown (2004), Museo Nacional Centro de Arte Reina Sofía, Madrid; Cecily Brown Paintings (2005), Modern Art Oxford; Cecily Brown: Rehearsal (2016), Drawing Center, New York; If Paradise Were Half as Nice (2018–2019), originating at the Instituto Tomie Ohtake, São Paulo; Cecily Brown (2020), Blenheim Palace, Woodstock, Oxfordshire; Cecily Brown: Death and the Maid (2023), Metropolitan Museum of Art; and Cecily Brown: Picture Making (2026), Serpentine Galleries, London.

She has also participated in many group exhibitions, including the Whitney Biennial (2004). Her work was included in the 2024 exhibition Making Their Mark: Works from the Shah Garg Collection at the Berkeley Art Museum and Pacific Film Archive (BAMPFA).

== Notable works in public collections ==
- Four Letter Heaven (Animation Cells) (1995), Museum of Modern Art, New York
- Untitled suite (1995), Museum für Moderne Kunst, Frankfurt, Germany
- Untitled (1997), MoMA PS1, Museum of Modern Art, New York
- Broken Lullaby (1999), Denver Art Museum
- Father of the Bride (1999), Buffalo AKG Art Museum, Buffalo, New York
- Service de Luxe (1999), Rubell Museum, Miami/Washington, D.C.
- Tender is the Night (1999), The Broad, Los Angeles
- Trouble in Paradise (1999), Tate, London
- Puttin' on the Ritz (1999–2000), Solomon R. Guggenheim Museum, New York
- Hoodlum (2000–2001), Hirshhorn Museum and Sculpture Garden, Smithsonian Institution, Washington, D.C.
- Black Painting I (2002), The Broad, Los Angeles
- Black Painting 2 (2002), Whitney Museum, New York
- Black Painting 4 (2003), Rubell Museum, Miami/Washington, D.C.
- Girl on a Swing (2004), National Gallery of Art, Washington, D.C.
- Girl on a Swing #2 (2004), The Broad, Los Angeles
- Red Suzannah (2004), San Francisco Museum of Modern Art
- Half-Bind (2005), Des Moines Art Center, Iowa
- Skulldiver III (Flightmask) (2006), Museum of Fine Arts, Boston
- Oh, Marie! (2007), Des Moines Art Center, Iowa; and Museum of Fine Arts, Boston
- Fair of Face, Full of Woe (2008), Metropolitan Museum of Art, New York
- All of Your Troubles Come from Yourself (2006–2009), Whitney Museum, New York
- Untitled (2010), Museum of Modern Art, New York
- A Storm at Sea (2017), Georgia Museum of Art, Athens
- Where, When, How Often, and with Whom (2017), Louisiana Museum of Modern Art, Humlebæk, Denmark
- Triumph of the Vanities II (2018), Brooklyn Museum, New York
- The Hound with the Horses' Hooves (2019), Yale Center for British Art, New Haven, Connecticut
