= Windjammer (disambiguation) =

A windjammer is a commercial sailing ship with multiple masts and rig configurations.

Windjammer or Windjammers may also refer to:

- Iron-hulled sailing ship, often called windjammer

== Arts and entertainment ==
- The Windjammer, a 1926 American silent film starring Billy Sullivan
- Windjammer (1930 film), a British film
- Windjammer (1937 film), an American film starring George O'Brien
- Windjammer (1958 film), a documentary
- Windjammer (album), recorded by jazz trumpeter Freddie Hubbard in 1976
- Windjammers (video game), an arcade game

== Businesses ==
- Windjammer Barefoot Cruises, a leisure cruise line based in Miami, Florida
- Windjammer Communications, a cable company
- a division of Valiant Comics created in 1995

== Sports teams ==
- Halifax Windjammers, a World Basketball League franchise
- Maine Windjammers, a semi-pro basketball team of Portland, Maine
- Tampa Bay Windjammers, a team (1996-1999) in the now defunct United States Basketball League

== Other uses ==
- Yamaha Windjammer, discontinued EWI
- A slang term used in the circus to refer to circus musicians
- An American term for the button accordion
- A motorcycle fairing produced by the Vetter Fairing Company in the 1970s
