= Suddenlink Communications =

Former American telecommunications company, acquired by Altice USA

- Type: Subsidiary
- Industry: Telecommunications
- Founded: 1992 (as Classic Communications); 2003 (as Cebridge Connections); 2006 (as Suddenlink)
- Defunct: August 1, 2022
- Fate: Rebranded into Optimum
- Successor: Optimum Communications (formerly Altice USA)
- Headquarters: St. Louis, Missouri, United States
- Key people: Dexter Goei (CEO, Altice Group / executive chairman, Altice USA); Hakim Boubazine (co-president and Chief Operating Officer, Altice USA); Charles F. Stewart (co-president and CFO, Altice USA)
- Services: Cable television; high-speed Internet; telephone; home security; advertising
- Website: optimum.com

Suddenlink Communications was an American telecommunications subsidiary of Altice USA (now Optimum Communications) trading in cable television, broadband, IP telephony, home security, and advertising. Prior to its acquisition by Altice, the company was the seventh largest cable operator with 1.5 million residential and 90,000 business subscribers. After Altice acquired Cablevision Systems Corporation on June 21, 2016, Suddenlink was combined with Cablevision. Together with Optimum, the name used by Cablevision for its products, Altice USA became the United States' fourth largest cable operator with 4.6 million subscribers, and the sixth largest Pay TV service provider with 3.5 million subscribers. On August 1, 2022, Suddenlink rebranded into Optimum.

== History ==
The predecessor to Suddenlink Communications was Cebridge Communications that was formed in September 2003 by its parent company Cequel III. Cequel III was formed in January 2002 by Jerry Kent, a former CEO for Charter Communications, Charter's co-founder Howard Wood and Dan Bergstein, a telecommunications lawyer. The company invested in Classic Communications on February 10, 2003, shortly after it emerged from bankruptcy. Classic Communications was founded in 1992 by Merritt Belisle and Steven Seach and the company was taken public on October 31, 1999, and filed for Chapter 11 bankruptcy protection on November 14, 2001. Classic had a total of 325,000 subscribers when Cequel III assumed management of the cable provider on February 10, 2003. Shortly after Cequel III acquired cable systems located in Texas with 27,000 subscribers from Canadian telecommunications provider Shaw Communications. In August 2003 Cequel acquired 81,000 subscribers from Alliance Communications Partners. After this acquisition Cequel formed Cebridge Connections which consisted of all the cable systems Cequel acquired up to this point. The combined company had 450,000 subscribers by the time the news was announced on September 15, 2003.

Logo of Cebridge Communications, 2001-2006

The company continued to acquire smaller cable systems after it became Cebridge including 78,000 from Thompson Cablevision on January 26, 2004, expanding the company into sixteen states. The company's coverage increased to twenty-three states when it closed its acquisitions of 19,000 customers from Tele-Media on June 3, 2004, and 40,000 customers from USA Media Systems on August 19, 2004. Cebridge Connections announced it would change its name to Suddenlink Communications in a soft launch on May 1, 2006, after the company completed its acquisition of 869,000 customers from Cox Communications. The hard launch of the re-branding occurred in July after the company completed its acquisition of 250,000 customers from Charter Communications after these acquisitions the company increased its total size to 1.4 million.

After Suddenlink completed its acquisition of the cable system from Charter, it focused on upgrading its existing infrastructure that was deemed "under-served" by previous owners. Suddenlink completed a $600 million debt offering on November 5, 2009, which allowed the company to make significant upgrades. The result of the upgrades allowed the company to expand its HD services and increase the number of HDTV channels while its broadband infrastructure was upgraded to DOCSIS 3.0 technology allowing for faster broadband speeds across its footprint. In July 2013 Suddenlink was the first major cable provider that all technicians and installers with the company for 90 days or more had obtained at least one professional certifications from Society of Cable Telecommunications Engineers. During the same month Suddenlink and TiVo announced that Suddenlink would distribute co-branded TiVo set top boxes to its subscriber base which allows the company to provide whole home DVR services and out of home streaming of recorded content. Four years after its last acquisition Suddenlink gained 8,000 subscribers it acquired from Windjammer Communications on August 1, 2010. On April 1, 2011, Suddenlink closed its acquisition of NPG Cable from the News-Press & Gazette Company. Suddenlink would go on to complete two more acquisitions in 2014 the first was Northand Communications that closed on January 2 and New Wave Communications that closed on October 1.

=== Acquisition by Altice ===
Suddenlink announced on July 18, 2012, that the company reached an agreement to be acquired for $6.6 billion by BC Partners, CPP Investment Board, and Suddenlink's management team led by Chairman and CEO Jerry Kent. Previously owned by Goldman Sachs Alternatives, Quadrangle Group, and Oaktree Capital Management, Suddenlink was 70% acquired by Altice on May 20, 2015, in a $9.1 billion deal. At the time of the announcement Suddenlink was the seventh largest cable operator with 1.5 million residential and 90,000 business subscribers. The deal closed on December 21, 2015. Altice also announced on September 17 that year it would acquire Cablevision for $17.7 billion and completed the deal on June 21, 2016. After both deals were completed Altice USA became the fourth largest cable operator in the country with 4.6 million subscribers and the sixth largest pay television operator with 3.50 million subscribers. Altice USA announced on April 11, 2017, the company has filed for an initial public offering. The company plans to raise up to $100 million with the IPO. Altice NV the parent company of Altice USA announced on May 24 that "all consumer-facing brands across the globe will change." Altice stated the re-branding would be complete by the second quarter in 2018.

In April 2022, Altice USA announced that Suddenlink would be rebranded under the Optimum name. On August 1, Suddenlink was fully amalgamated into Optimum.

== Markets ==
At time of merger with Optimum, Suddenlink operated services in thirteen states: Arizona, Arkansas, California, Idaho, Kentucky, Louisiana, Mississippi, Missouri, North Carolina, Ohio, Oklahoma, Texas, and West Virginia.

== Carriage disputes ==
Suddenlink has been involved with two high-profile carriage disputes over the years. The first was with Sinclair Broadcasting Group over two local stations it operates in the Huntington-Charleston, West Virginia designated market area. The dispute became public on June 30, 2006, and was resolved on August 8, 2006. The second involved Viacom and its cable channels Nickelodeon, MTV, Spike (Now Paramount Network), TV Land, VH1, and various spin-off channels.

=== Sinclair Broadcasting Group ===
After Suddenlink completed its acquisition of cable systems from Charter Communications in 2006, the company entered into a public carriage dispute with Sinclair Broadcasting Group over two local television stations in the region. Sinclair owns and operates WCHS-TV, the local ABC affiliate in the Huntington–Charleston DMA. Sinclair also operates the local Fox affiliate, WVAH-TV, owned by Cunningham Broadcasting and operated through a local marketing agreement by Sinclair. The dispute impacted a total of 240,000 Suddenlink subscribers, 200,000 of which were included in the Huntington–Charleston DMA proper. The dispute also impacted 40,000 subscribers in the nearby Bluefield–Beckley–Oak Hill and Parkersburg DMAs, where Charter imported the signals of WCHS and WVAH because Beckley did not have a Fox affiliate and Parkersburg lacked an ABC affiliate at the time.

The agreement between Charter and Sinclair had expired prior to Suddenlink's acquisition. Both parties began negotiations in May 2006 before the acquisition was completed. Sinclair announced on June 30 that it was unable to reach an agreement with Suddenlink. Sinclair argued that Suddenlink's proposals included no compensation and no response to their counteroffer. Without a retransmission consent agreement, Suddenlink would not be allowed to carry the two stations on any of its cable systems. During the dispute Sinclair posted a letter on the websites of the two stations and began to notify viewers with scrolling crawl messages on the bottom of the screen encouraging them to switch to another provider like DirecTV or Dish Network. While this was a comparable solution for the Huntington-Charleston area the two satellite providers did not provide the two stations to viewers in Beckley or Parkersburg.

Suddenlink subsequently filed an Emergency Retransmission Consent Complaint with the Federal Communications Commission (FCC) on July 5, claiming Sinclair failed to negotiate in good faith for the stations and demanded Suddenlink to stop carriage of the two stations during a Nielsen rating sweeps period. The following day Sinclair also submitted a filing with the FCC requesting the Commission order Suddenlink to cease carriage of its signals. Suddenlink claimed that Sinclair was originally asking for $4 million in fees over the three-year life of an agreement but changed the offer to a one time fee of $200 per subscriber ($40 million total) and $1 per month in subscriber fees ($2.4 million annually) in order to carry the stations after Sinclair found out how much Suddenlink paid Charter for the systems.

Suddenlink claimed it was obliged to carry the stations until the end of the Nielsen sweeps, yet this was disputed with Sinclair claiming the rule was intended to benefit broadcasters, not distributors. On July 3 Sinclair withdrew the out-of-market signals, but left the stations on in Suddenlink's Huntington–Charleston systems. On July 27 both parties agreed to a temporary extension which kept the stations on Suddenlink's systems until August 7 if an agreement was not reached. Suddenlink and Sinclair reached an agreement on August 8 and withdrew their FCC petitions. While the terms of the agreement were not made public Pete Able, Suddenlink's vice president of government relations, stated the company "made it very clear" that the $40 million fee "was never something we could find mutually agreeable."

=== Viacom ===
Prior to October 1, 2014, Suddenlink carried cable channels from Viacom, including BET, CMT, Comedy Central, MTV, Nickelodeon, Paramount Network, TV Land, VH1 and various smaller spin-off networks. The two companies were able to reach an agreement at the end of 2010 for continued carriage of Viacom's channels that was to end on September 30, 2014. Viacom had been involved in notable contract discussion in the past including a media battle with satellite provider DirecTV in 2012 which resulted in their channels being unavailable for nine days before reaching an agreement. After Viacom's channels were pulled from smaller provider Cable ONE on April 1, 2014, the cable provider replaced them with other channels. The contract negotiations became public on September 25, 2014, after five months of talks broke down between both companies. Suddenlink claimed Viacom wanted a 50% increase in fees for its programming despite its ratings decreasing. Viacom rebutted stating it attracts the greatest share of viewing of any cable provider. Suddenlink noted the majority of its customer base "do not want the Viacom channels" and did not want to pay more for Viacom's channels and wanted others instead.

After the deadline passed, all Viacom channels were pulled from Suddenlink's lineup on October 1, 2014. Viacom claimed that Suddenlink rejected one of its own proposals and informed them they would drop the channels. Suddenlink maintained that Viacom rejected every proposal the company made to continue carrying Viacom's channels. Suddenlink reorganized their channel lineups to replace the Viacom channels; some of the replacements were already available to Suddenlink while some were not previously available. Suddenlink replaced Viacom's channels with twenty other channels including FXX, Hallmark Movies & Mysteries, Investigation Discovery, OWN, Universal Kids (formerly Sprout), TheBlaze, Pivot and Up. Due to Suddenlink's size the company received positive reception in the media saying the decision could inspire other mid-small size operators. Six months after dropping Viacom's channels Suddenlink's then-CEO Jerry Kent stated 2%–2.5% of its video subscribers dropped their service. He also noted that some of the replacement channels were viewed more than some of the dropped channels. Despite losing some video subscribers, Kent also stated "meeting the programmer’s demands would have been more costly. When Pivot ceased operations, Suddenlink started carried i24 News."

Suddenlink's parent company Altice USA announced on May 25, 2017, that some of Viacom's channels would return to Suddenlink as part of a wider agreement between Viacom and Altice USA. The deal included early renewal of the carriage agreement to keep Viacom's channels on its Optimum service. Viacom and Altice USA did not announce which Viacom channels or the date they would return to Suddenlink systems. Suddenlink has reached an agreement to bring back Viacom channels in Texas and Oklahoma.

== Controversial practices ==
Starting in 2011 Suddenlink began to implement data usage limits, also known as data caps, on its broadband services on all its service plans. After exceeding the data allowance for a particular service plan an overage charge of $10 per 50 GB block is billed to the customer. Shortly after data usage limits began to roll out across Suddenlink's territory customers began to report the meter used was inaccurate. One example highlighted one user's router measured that 2.22 GB of data was used in one day while Suddenlink's meter showed 23 GB of data was used in the same period. Another user questioned a customer service representative how her equipment logged 12 GB of data used when electricity was out. By August 27, 2012, the company temporarily suspended its data usage policy while a third party was hired to validate the accuracy of its metering systems. By June 3, 2013, Suddenlink had resumed its data usage limits policy and began charging overages. After Altice completed its acquisition of Suddenlink the company added back unlimited usage plans for its top two tiers only on April 1, 2016.

Altice USA and its Optimum branded services have been criticized for a policy change in where if a subscriber cancels one or all of their services before the end of their billing cycle they do not receive a refund. Altice USA has implemented this policy change for both its Suddenlink and Optimum branded services. This policy went into effect for Suddenlink subscribers on June 1, 2016, and for Optimum on October 10. On May 30, 2017, a class action lawsuit was filed against Altice USA claiming that the company illegally changed the terms and conditions of its cancellation policy and did not provide adequate notice to customers. The lawsuit also claims the company broke New York's General Business Law for deceptive practices and unjust enrichment. Altice has stated subscribers were given advance notice of the new policy and that customer service representatives are trained to tell departing customers billing continues until the end of the billing cycle so they can choose to disconnect at that time.
