= Samuel Sotheby =

Samuel Sotheby (1771–1842) was an English auctioneer and antiquary.

== Background ==
Samuel Sotheby's uncle, John Sotheby (1740–1807), was partner and nephew of Samuel Baker, who founded at York Street, Covent Garden, in 1744 the first English sale-exclusively for books, manuscripts, and prints. In 1774 Baker took George Leigh into partnership, and from 1775 to 1777 the firm was styled S. Baker & G. Leigh. After 1778, when Baker died, Leigh carried on the business alone, but from 1780 to 1800 John Sotheby (Baker's nephew) was associated with him, and the firm was known as Leigh & Sotheby.

== Career ==
The firm became Leigh, Sotheby, & Son in 1800, when John Sotheby's nephew Samuel joined it, and so continued till 1803. After 1803, and until the death of Leigh in 1815, the firm carried on their business at a new address, 145 Strand. John Sotheby died in 1807, and on Leigh's death, eight years later, Samuel continued the concern by himself, moving to 3 Waterloo Street, Strand, about 1817. Soon afterwards he took his son Samuel Leigh Sotheby into partnership, and in 1826 Messrs. Sotheby & Son printed a Catalogue of the Collections sold by Messrs. Baker, Leigh, & Sotheby from 1744 to 1826.

Samuel Sotheby conducted the dispersal of many famous libraries. He retired from business in 1827. The firm Sotheby's still exists.

Sotheby died at Chelsea on 4 January 1842, in his seventy-first year.

== Bibliophile ==
Sotheby was interested the history of printing. He began to trace facsimiles of early printed books in 1814. After a visit to the Netherlands in 1824 to examine specimens at Haarlem for his friend William Young Ottley, his attention was first specially directed to block books. His collections were edited by his son as The Typography of the Fifteenth Century, 1845, and Principia Typographica, 1858, 3 vols.

== Family ==
Sotheby first married, in 1803, Harriet Barton (1775–1808), by whom he had two sons and two daughters; the youngest son was Samuel Leigh Sotheby. His second wife was Laura Smith, married in 1817. She had no surviving children.
