= Tad Smith =

American businessman (born 1965)

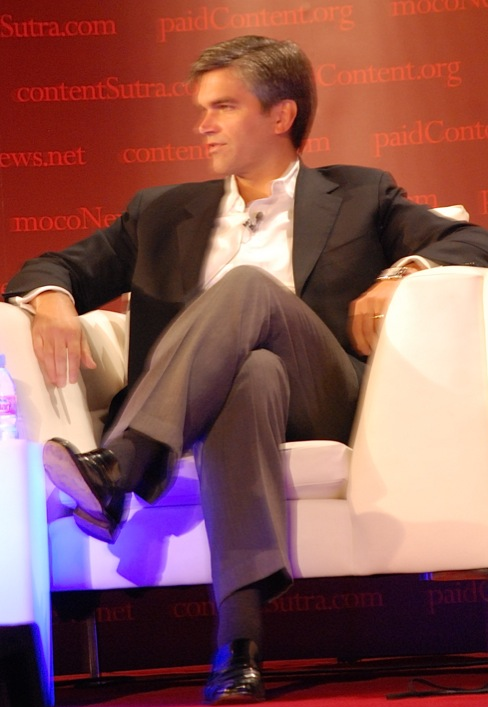
- Smith in 2007
- Born: June 1965 (age 61)
- Education: Princeton University (BA); Harvard University (MBA)
- Spouse: Caroline Mitchell Fitzgibbons (1997–present)
- Children: 2

Thomas Sidney "Tad" Smith, Jr. (born June 1965) is an American businessman, the former president and chief executive officer of Sotheby's. Smith is also an adjunct professor at New York University's Stern School of Business.

== Education ==
Smith graduated with an AB from the Woodrow Wilson School of Public and International Affairs at Princeton University in 1987 after completing a 124-page long senior thesis titled "The Philosophical Transformation of Constitutional Privacy." While a student at Princeton, Smith received the R.W. Van de Velde Prize for outstanding junior independent work. He later received an MBA from Harvard Business School, where he was a George F. Baker scholar and a Horace W. Goldsmith fellow.

== Career ==
Smith was CEO of the US branch of Reed Business Information.

For five years until 2014, Smith worked for Cablevision in a variety of executive positions.

From February 2014 to March 2015, Smith was president and CEO of New York's Madison Square Garden, doubling net profits in the second half of that year.

In March 2015, Sotheby's announced that Smith would succeed William F. Ruprecht as its president and CEO. Smith's basic salary will be $1.4 million, plus "target annual bonus opportunity will be 200% of his annual base salary", and "long-term incentive award opportunities" in Sotheby's shares.

In October 2019, Sotheby's was acquired by Patrick Drahi, and shareholders received $57 per share, with Smith receiving $28 million.

In October 2019, Drahi replaced Smith with Charles Stewart, the CFO of Altice USA.

Since 1999, Smith has taught at New York University's Stern School of Business, where he is an adjunct professor in the finance department, and runs a course entitled, "Strategy and Finance for Technology, Media, and Entertainment Companies".

== Personal life ==
Smith is married to Caroline Mitchell Fitzgibbons, a realtor. They have two children, and live in Bronxville, New York.
