= Charles F. Stewart =

American business executive (born 1969)

- Born: December 1969 (age 56); New Haven, Connecticut
- Education: Yale University
- Occupation: Businessman
- Title: CEO of Sotheby's
- Spouse: Caterina Heil Stewart
- Children: 3

Charles F. Stewart (born December 1969) is an American business executive who is known for his role as the chief executive officer of Sotheby’s. Stewart was the former co-president and chief financial officer of Altice USA.

== Early life and education ==
Stewart attended Phillips Exeter Academy. He majored in history and received a bachelor's degree from Yale University. He went into investment banking after graduation upon seeing a former classmate working at an investment company with financial relationships in Brazil.

== Career ==
In 1996, Stewart helped to open Morgan Stanley’s first Latin American office in Brazil. Stewart was involved with the international IPO of Unibanco and the privatization of Telebras during the 19 years he worked at Morgan Stanley.

On June 24, 2013, Stewart was appointed chief executive officer of Itaú BBA International, the corporate investment bank of the Itaú Unibanco group.

In 2015, Stewart was named co-president and chief financial officer of Altice USA after Patrick Drahi closed a $9.1 billion deal to acquire 70% of St. Louis-based cable operator Suddenlink. Stewart oversaw Altice’s initial public offering, raising $1.9 billion for the company.

In 2019, Stewart became the chief executive officer for Sotheby’s, another Drahi owned company.

Stewart serves on the Prep for Prep's board of trustees and the Coalition for College's board of directors.

== Personal life ==
Stewart is married and has three children, two daughters and a son. Stewart has a home in the Hamptons.
