= Nicolai Ouroussoff =

American architectural critic

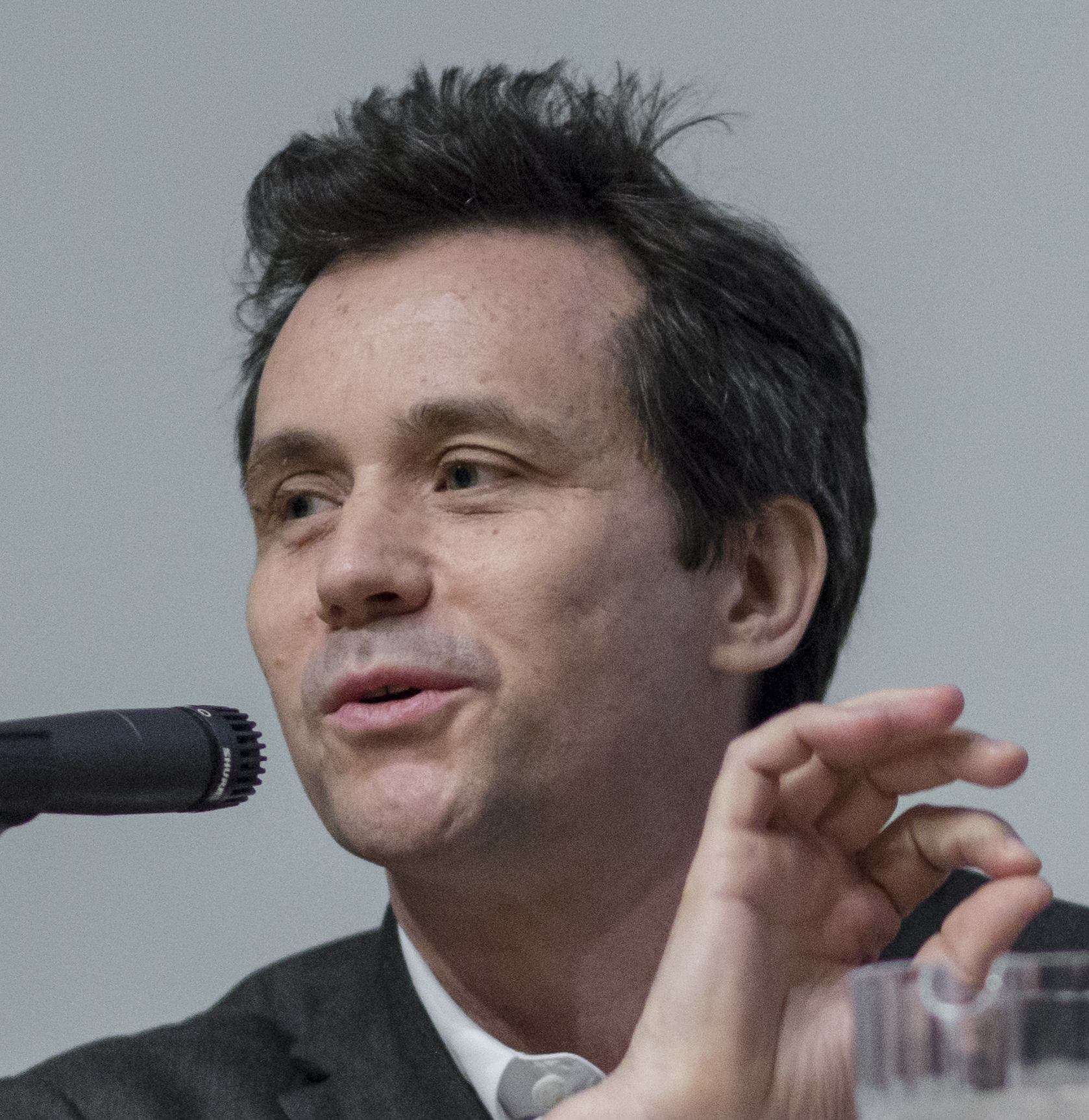
- Born: Cambridge, Massachusetts
- Education: Georgetown University, Columbia University
- Spouse: Cecily Brown

Nicolai Ouroussoff (Russian: Николай Урусов) is a writer and educator who was an architecture critic for the Los Angeles Times and The New York Times.

== Biography ==
Born in Cambridge, Massachusetts to a family from Russia, he received a bachelor's degree in Russian from Georgetown University and a master's degree in architecture from the Columbia Graduate School of Architecture, Planning and Preservation. He is currently Adjunct Associate Professor of Architecture at Columbia Graduate School of Architecture, Planning and Preservation.

A protégé of the late Herbert Muschamp, Ouroussoff replaced his mentor as the New York Times architecture critic in 2004 after his stint at the Los Angeles Times. He wrote the newspaper's obituary for Muschamp in 2007.

Ouroussoff was a nominated finalist for the Pulitzer Prize in criticism in 2003, 2004, 2006, and 2011.

In 2011, it was announced that he would leave The New York Times to write a book. He was succeeded as architectural critic by Michael Kimmelman.

He is married to the U.K.-born painter Cecily Brown.
