= Dexter Goei =

American businessman

- Born: Dexter Gregory Goei; 1971 (age 54–55); US
- Education: Georgetown University
- Occupation: Businessman
- Title: President, Altice; Chairman and CEO, Altice USA
- Successor: Incumbent

Dexter Gregory Goei (born 1971) is an American businessman who is former CEO of Altice USA, a subsidiary of multinational telecoms company Altice N.V.

== Early life ==
Dexter Goei was born in 1971, the son of Dr. Gordon Goei, an obstetrician/gynecologist in Beverly Hills, California. His father Gordon is a Chinese-Indonesian American born in Solo who moved to The Hague at age 10 and immigrated to the United States to study at Calvin College on a scholarship. His mother, a Dutch citizen, is also of Chinese-Indonesian descent. He has an older brother Danton G. Goei, who is a portfolio manager at Davis Selected Advisers. His family name is 魏 in Chinese.

In 1993, Goei graduated with a Bachelor of Science in Foreign Service degree in International Economics Major from the Walsh School of Foreign Service at Georgetown University.

== Career ==
In his early career, Goei worked in investment banking with JP Morgan and then Morgan Stanley. In 2009, he joined Altice.

Before his appointment in June 2016 as president of Altice N.V., and chairman and CEO of Altice USA, Goei had served as CEO of Altice N.V. since he joined the company in 2009. Goei led the company's entrance into the U.S. market through the acquisitions of Cablevision Systems Corporation (June 2016) and Suddenlink Communications (December 2015), which are now part of Altice USA.

He is on The Paley Center for Media's Board of Trustees.

== Personal life ==
In 2016, he bought a 12,000-square-foot building in New York's Greenwich Village for $30.6 million. When he bought the building, it was an 11-unit multi-family building, but he converted into a single-family mansion. He sold the mansion for $72.5 million in 2024. He lives in New York City with his wife and children.
