= Lorna Kelly =

Lorna Kelly (August 12, 1945 – June 15, 2016) was a New York City socialite known for her auctioneering skills for Sotheby's. Born in England, Kelly was one of the first female fine art auctioneers in the world. She made history in the art world when she became the first female fine art auctioneer in America while working for Sotheby's. Over many successful years, she expanded her fine arts auction career to include charity auctions and to raise money and awareness for a variety of causes.

Kelly had a wide range of other interests. She appeared in many films and television shows, most famously Sex and the City. She lectured on leadership, spirituality, and personal growth. She filmed many TEDTalks, including "The Power of Decisions", and "The Decisiveness Dilemma". She is the author of two memoirs: The Camel Knows the Way and In the Footsteps of the Camel.

Kelly died at age 70 on June 15, 2016.
