= William F. Ruprecht =

Former CEO of Sotheby's

William F. Ruprecht (born 1956) was CEO of Sotheby's from 2000 to 2014, when he was succeeded by Tad Smith.

== Education and early work life ==
Ruprecht was born in St. Louis, Missouri in 1956. His mother was a painter and his father was a businessman. After graduating from the St. Louis Country Day School in 1974, he attended several universities, and graduated from the University of Vermont with majors in sculpture and fine arts. After college, Ruprecht worked as an apprentice to a furniture maker in Vermont. In 2008, Ruprecht became a trustee of the University of Vermont.

== Sotheby's ==
Ruprecht joined Sotheby's in 1980.

Ruprecht was named CEO of Sotheby's in February 2000 and was elected chairman in 2012. He had previously was Executive Vice President of Sotheby's and Managing Director of the company's North and South American divisions. Ruprecht stepped down in November, 2014 amid criticism from hedge-fund billionaire and activist investor Daniel Loeb.

On 17 March 2015, it was announced that Tad Smith would succeed Ruprecht as CEO of Sotheby's.
