= Phyllis Kao =

American auctioneer

- Born: Berkeley, California, US
- Education: Columbia University (BA)
- Occupation: Auctioneer

Phyllis Kao is an American auctioneer who serves as vice president of the luxury division at Sotheby's New York. As an auctioneer, she is known for her unique cadence, Mid-Atlantic accent, mannerisms, and fashion sense.

== Early life ==
Phyllis Kao was born in Berkeley, California, to Taiwanese immigrants. She graduated from Berkeley High School before studying Chinese history at Columbia University.

== Career ==
After graduating, Kao planned to become a professor of ancient Greek history, but accepted a job offer as an auction clerk with the Oakland-based Clars Auctions. After working as a clerk for a year, she become an auctioneer.

In 2016, Kao began working for Sotheby's New York, where she worked as both an auctioneer and a specialist in the Chinese Works of Art department. She went on to become the US director of business development for Bonhams. After returning to work for Sotheby's, Kao's "sharp wit" combined with her enunciation and Mid-Atlantic accent garnered attention on social media. She has stated that she uses fashion to "direct attention, set tone and build narrative" as an auctioneer.

In July 2024, Kao was the auctioneer during the sale of Apex, a fossilized Stegosaurus estimated to be 150 million years old. Despite having a pre-sale estimated value of $4–6 million, Apex sold for $44.6 million. The New York Times described Kao's style of auctioneering as "captivating", writing that "the alchemy is in [Kao's] stance ... she bends toward the packed room with a gleam in her eye, almost flirting with the bidders. Then she rocks back to show that, maybe, actually, she doesn't care about their bid at all. Aloof, she subtly feigns indifference." Clips of Kao during the auction went viral on TikTok, with one video garnering 3.9 million views in two days.

Kao has auctioned pieces for various organizations, including the Atlantic Theater Company, Sundance Film Festival, and American Friends of the Louvre.

== Personal life ==
Kao lives in New York City. She speaks Mandarin, French, German, and English.

In 2024, she was named one of The New York Times' most stylish people. In 2025, Vogue included Kao on their Best Dressed list. That same year, the Asia Society named Kao as the winner of their West Coast Game Changer Award.
