= Samuel Leigh Sotheby =

English auctioneer and antiquary (1805–1861)

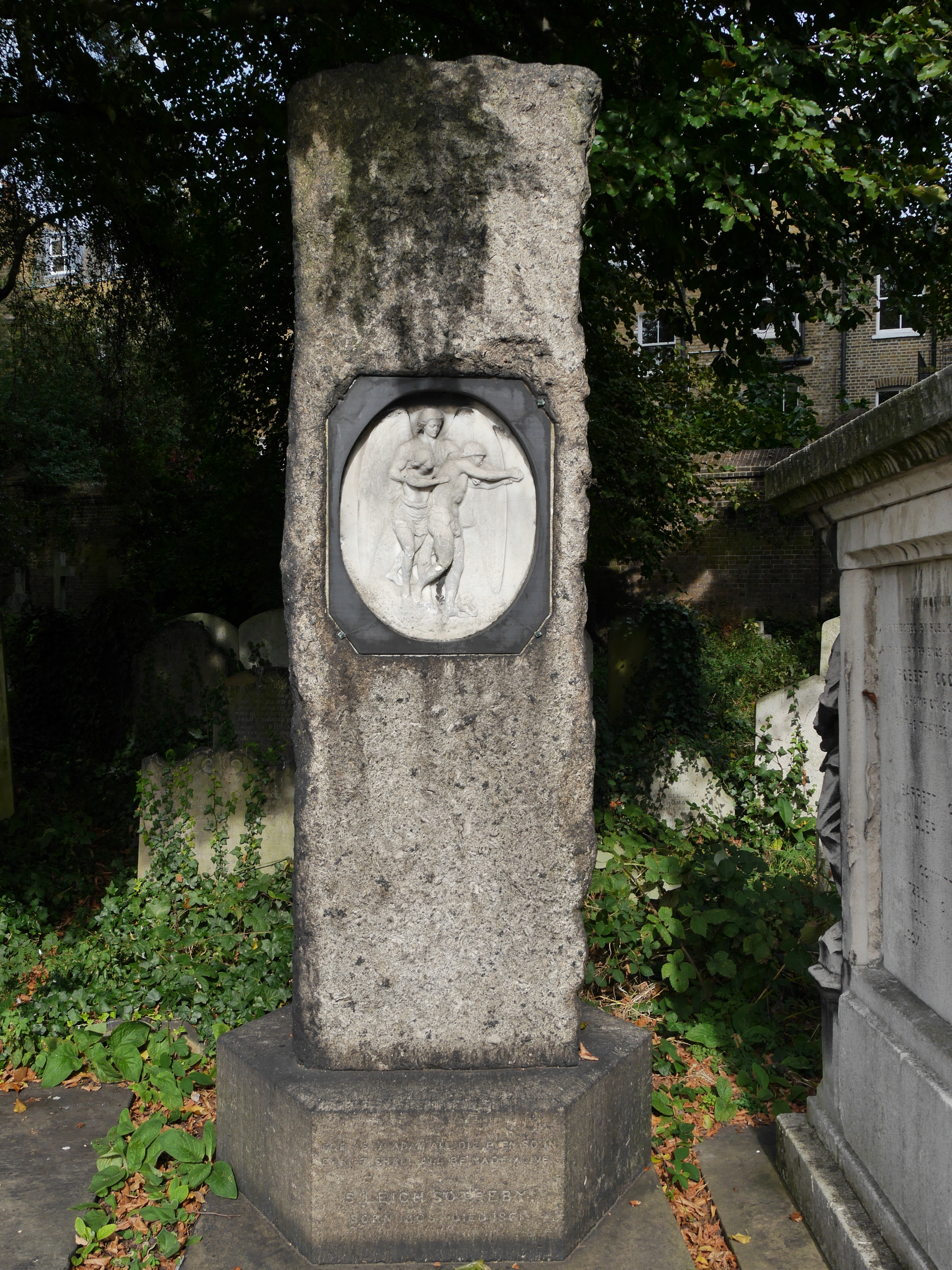
Brompton Cemetery monument

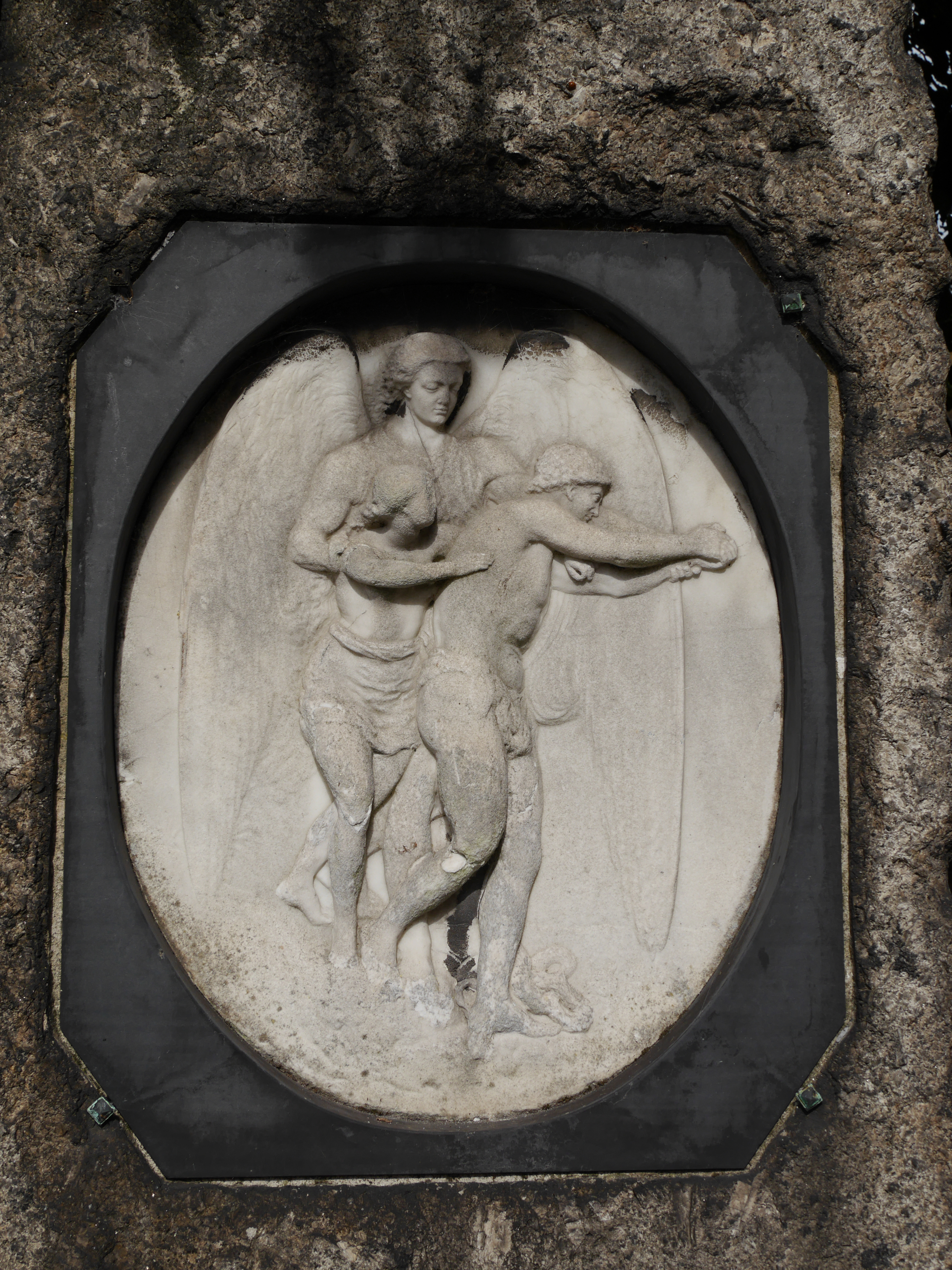
Brompton Cemetery monument

Samuel Sotheby (31 August 1805 – 19 June 1861) was an English auctioneer and antiquary.

== Background ==
He was born on 31 August 1805 in Hampstead, London, the son of Samuel Sotheby (1771–1842).

== Career ==
The firm became Leigh, Sotheby, & Son in 1800, when John Sotheby's nephew Samuel joined it, and so continued till 1803. After 1803, and until the death of Leigh in 1815, the firm carried on their business at a new address, 145 Strand. John Sotheby died in 1807, and on Leigh's death, eight years later, Samuel continued the concern by himself, moving to 3 Wellington Street, Strand, about 1817. Soon afterwards he took his son Samuel Leigh Sotheby into partnership, and in 1826 Messrs. Sotheby & Son printed a Catalogue of the Collections sold by Messrs. Baker, Leigh, & Sotheby from 1744 to 1826.

He died on 19 June 1861, drowning in the River Dart near Buckfastleigh, Devon.
