= Windjammer Communications =

American cable company

Windjammer Communications, LLC
- Industry: Telecommunications
- Founded: 2008
- Headquarters: Marshall, Missouri, United States
- Products: Cable television HDTV; Digital phone Broadband
- Website: http://www.windjammercable.com

Windjammer Cable is a small cable company formed by the sale of 25 systems that served 80,000 customers in rural areas that Time Warner Cable acquired from the bankrupt Adelphia. Windjammer was created specifically for this deal and consisted of Boston private-equity concern MAST Capital Management and Jupiter, Fla.-based small cable operator Communications Construction Services (CCS).

Although it acquired some systems, such as all but two West Virginia systems, Subscribers received a letter on January 24, 2009 stated that they will terminate service on February 17, 2009; the original date of the digital transition in the United States.

It was reported in 2010 that CCS left the partnership and the number of cable systems was reduced to 15 core markets.

In August 2011, Windjammer divested cable systems in Fort Benning, GA; Fort Payne, AL; and Cullman, AL to Charter.

In 2012, Windjammer sold its remaining cable systems to Zito Media. The systems were located in California, Idaho, Kansas, Missouri, Texas and Washington. The acquisition was completed on October 15, 2012.

== See also ==
- Adelphia Communications Corporation
- Time Warner Cable
- Comcast
- Charter Communications
