= John Sotheby =

British auctioneer

- Born: 1740; Britain
- Died: 1 November 1807 (aged 66–67); Chigwell, Essex, England
- Occupation: auctioneer
- Known for: namesake of Sotheby’s auction house
- Spouse: Elizabeth Cotton
- Parent(s): John Sotheby and Anne Baker

John Sotheby (1740 – 1 November 1807) was an English auctioneer who is the eponym of Sotheby's auction house.

== Early life ==
Sotheby was born in 1740 in England to John Sotheby (1703–1775) and Anne Baker. The Sotheby family originally came from Yorkshire, England.

== Background ==
Auction house Baker and Leigh was founded in London on 11 March 1744. He was the nephew of Samuel Baker, who was the founder of the book auctioneering firm that later became Sotheby's.

After his uncle's death in 1778, John became a partner in his book auctioneering firm along with George Leigh. He expanded the scope of the firm’s business to include the sale of prints, medals, coins, and rare antiquities.

== Personal life ==
Sotheby died on 1 November 1807 in Chigwell, Essex.
