= Sotheby's =

International auction house

Coordinates: 51°30′43″N 0°08′37″W

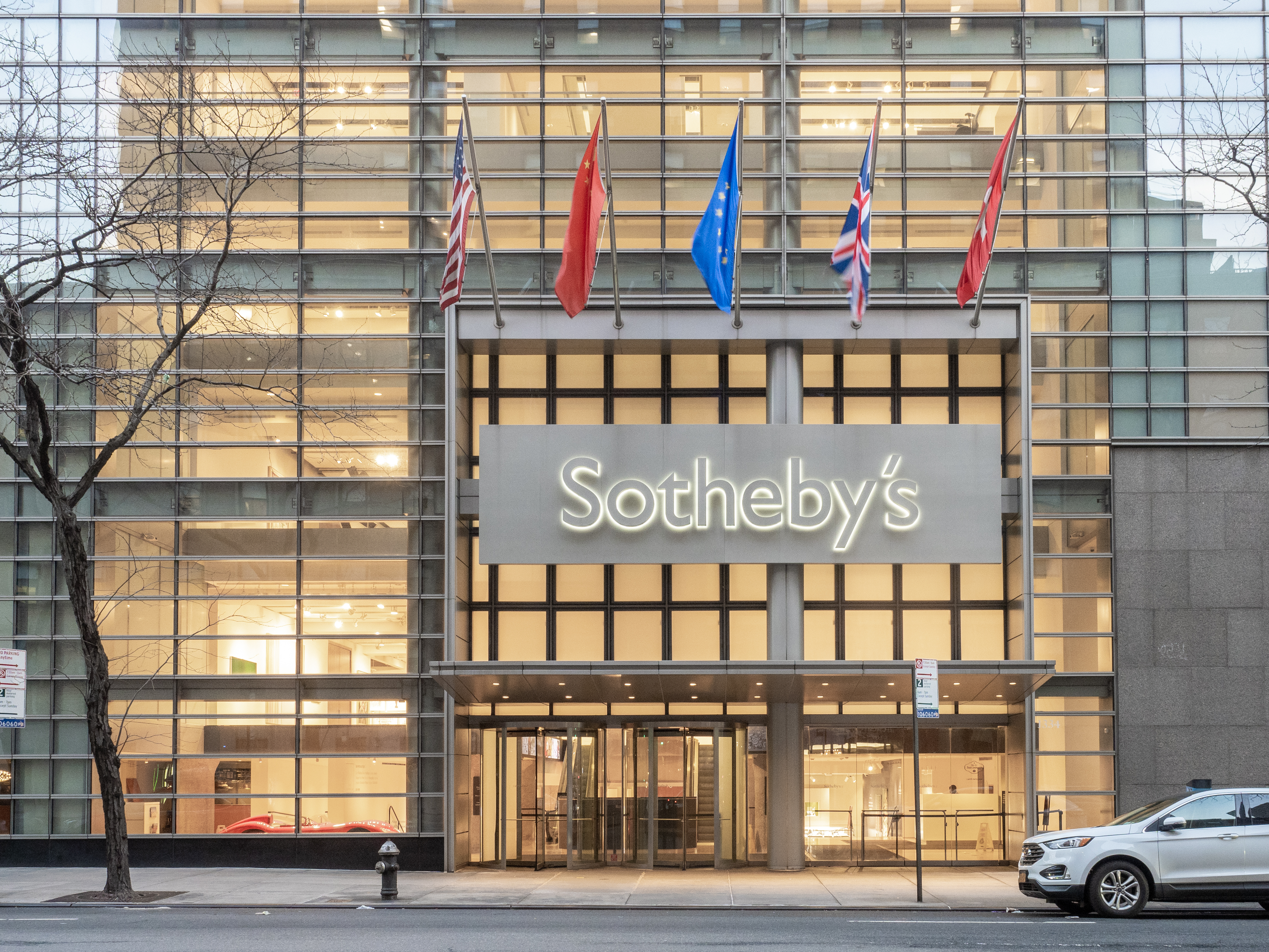
- Sotheby's worldwide headquarters on York Avenue, on the Upper East Side of Manhattan
- Type: Private
- Industry: Fine arts, rare objects
- Founded: 11 March 1744 (282 years ago) in London, England
- Founder: Samuel Baker
- Headquarters: 1334 York Avenue, New York City, U.S.
- Number of locations: 80 locations in 40 countries (as of 2021)
- Area served: Worldwide
- Key people: Charles F. Stewart (CEO)
- Services: Auctions, financial services
- Owner: Patrick Drahi
- Subsidiaries: Sotheby's Institute of Art, Sotheby's International Realty, RM Sotheby's
- Website: sothebys.com

Sotheby's (/ˈsʌðəbiz/ SUDH-ə-beez) is a British multinational corporation with headquarters in New York City. It is one of the world's oldest and largest brokers of fine and decorative art, jewellery, and collectibles. It has 80 locations in 40 countries, and maintains a significant presence in the UK.

Sotheby's was established on 11 March 1744 in London by Samuel Baker, a bookseller. In 1767, the firm became Baker & Leigh, after George Leigh became a partner, and was renamed to Leigh and Sotheby in 1778 after Baker's death when his nephew, John Sotheby, inherited Baker's share. Other former names include: Leigh, Sotheby and Wilkinson; Sotheby, Wilkinson and Hodge (1864–1924); Sotheby and Company (1924–83); Mssrs Sotheby; Sotheby & Wilkinson; Sotheby Mak van Waay; and Sotheby's & Co.

The American holding company was initially incorporated in August 1983 in Michigan as Sotheby's Holdings, Inc. In June 2006, it was reincorporated in the State of Delaware and was renamed Sotheby's. In June 2019, Sotheby's was acquired by French-Israeli businessman Patrick Drahi at a 61% market premium.

Sotheby's Institute of Art (an educational facility), Sotheby's International Realty (real estate dealers), and RM Sotheby's (classic car dealers) are subsidiaries or partner organisations.

== History ==
=== Beginnings (18th and 19th century) ===
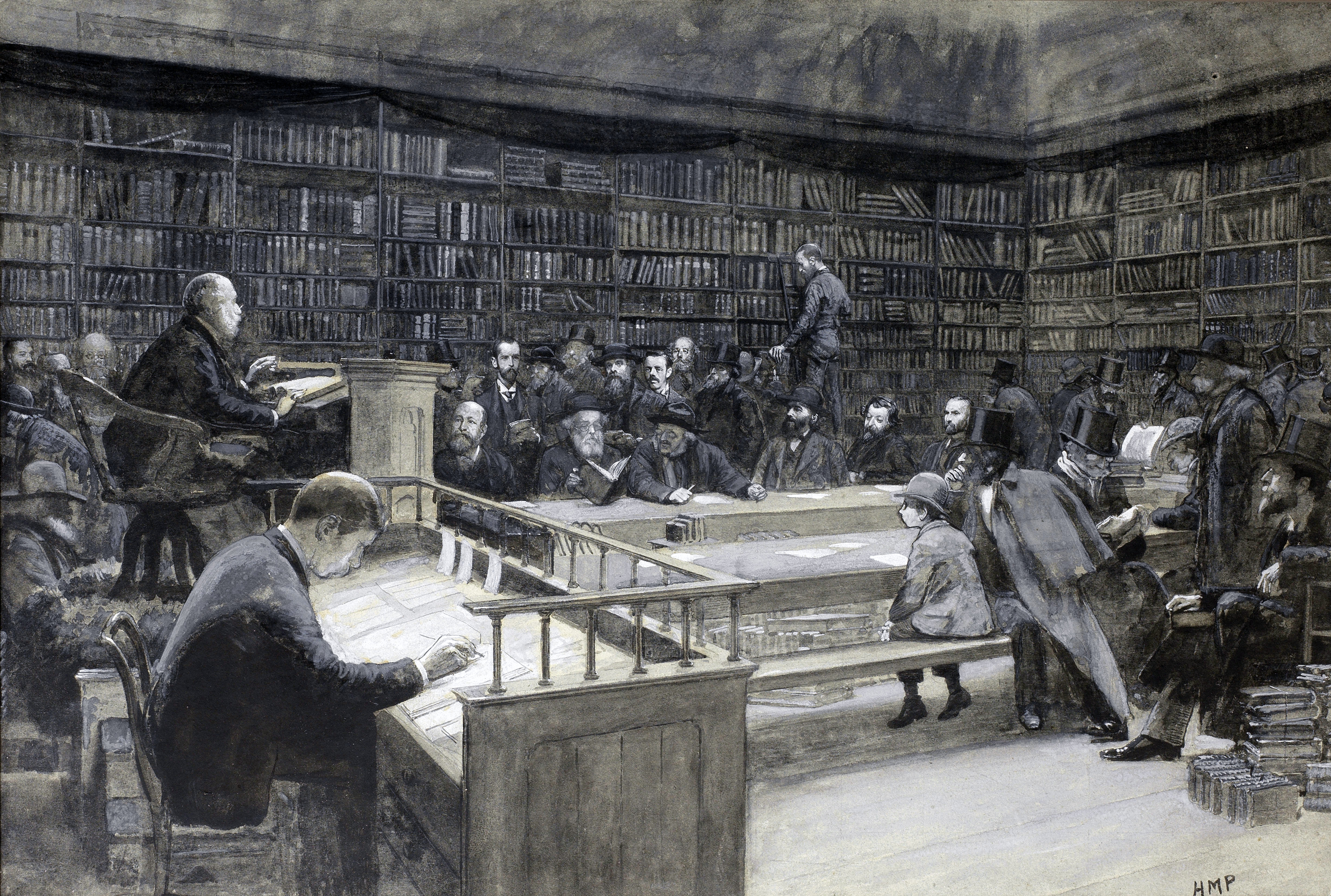
A book sale in progress at Messrs Sotheby, Wilkinson & Hodge of Wellington Street, London, 1888

Sotheby's was established on 11 March 1744 in London by Samuel Baker, a bookseller.

In 1767 the firm became Baker & Leigh, after Samuel Baker auctioned several hundred valuable books from the library of The Rt Hon Sir John Stanley, 1st Baronet, of Grangegorman and became business partners with George Leigh. The library Napoleon took with him into exile at St Helena, as well as the library collections of John Wilkes, Benjamin Heywood Bright and the Dukes of Devonshire and of Buckingham (both related to George Leigh), were sold through Samuel Baker's auctions.

After Baker's death in 1778, the business was left to Leigh and his nephew John Sotheby, where it became a prominent book auction house and was renamed Leigh and Sotheby.

George Leigh died in 1816, but not before recruiting Samuel E Leigh into the business. Under the Sotheby family, the auction house extended its activities to auctioning prints, medals, and coins. John Wilkinson, Sotheby's senior accountant, became a partner and eventually the company's new head of the company when the last member of the Sotheby family died in 1861.

=== 20th century ===
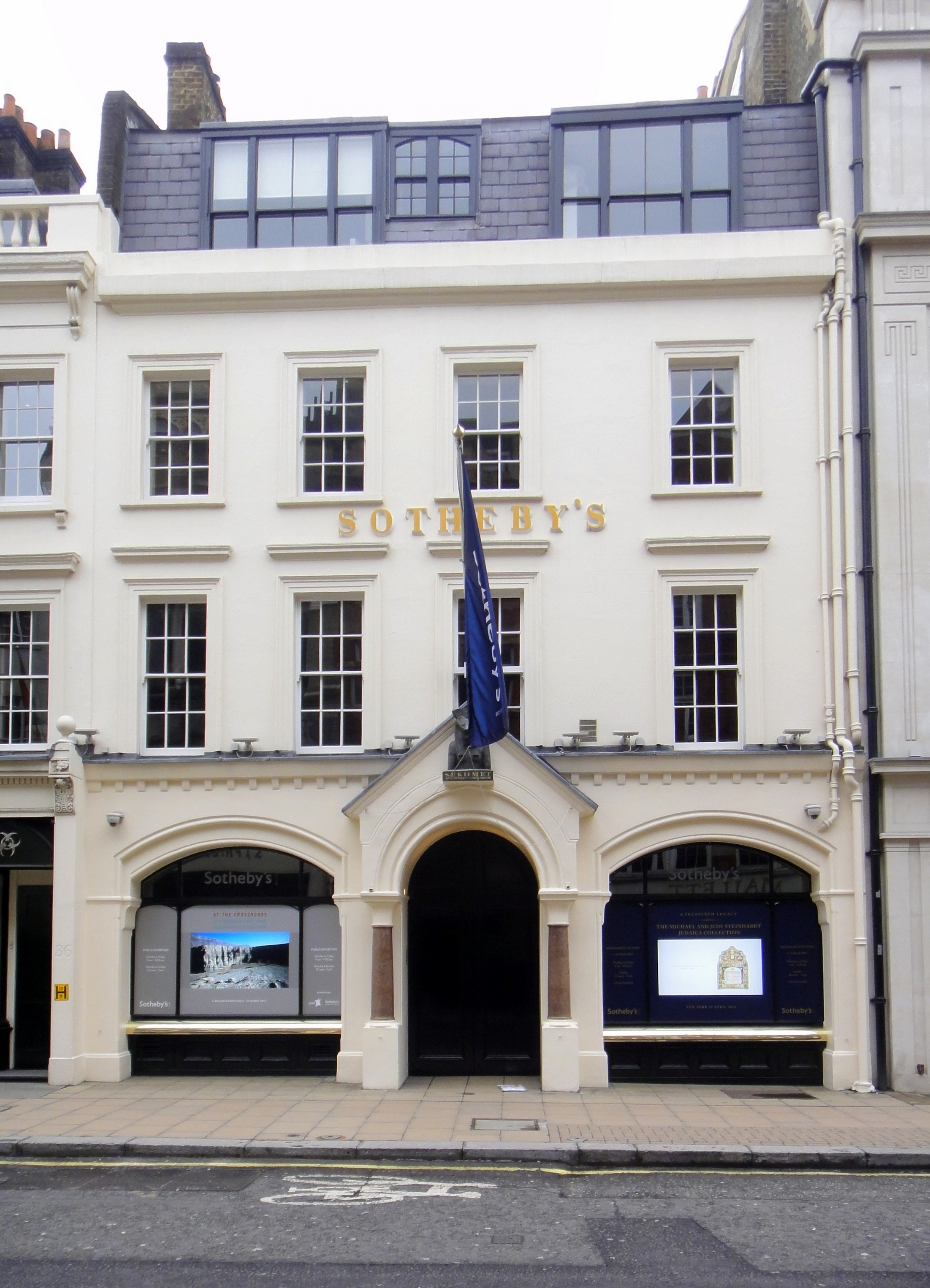
Sotheby's office on New Bond Street, London

The business did not seek to auction fine arts initially. Their first major success in this field was the sale of a Frans Hals painting for nine thousand guineas in 1913. Other former names include: Leigh, Sotheby and Wilkinson; Sotheby, Wilkinson and Hodge (1864–1924); Sotheby and Company (1924–83); Mssrs Sotheby; Sotheby & Wilkinson; Sotheby Mak van Waay; and Sotheby's & Co.

In 1917, Sotheby's relocated from 13 Wellington Street to 34–35 New Bond Street, which remains as its London base. They soon came to rival Christie's as leaders of the London auction market, which capitalised on the arts.

In 1964, Sotheby's purchased Parke-Bernet, the largest auctioneer of fine art in the United States at the time. In the following year, Sotheby's moved to 980 Madison Avenue, New York. With the international fine art auction industry growing, Sotheby's opened offices in Paris and Los Angeles in 1967, and became the first auction house to operate in Hong Kong in 1973, and Moscow in 1988.

As well as numerous high-profile real-life auctions being held at Sotheby's, the firm's auctioneers have also been used in various films, including the 1983 James Bond film Octopussy.

In 1988 they introduced a Decorative Arts Award which showed in exhibitions in London and Tokyo. It is fair to say that not all commentators welcomed the move dismissing some exhibits as Crafts. However, several notable people were amongst the participants. Michael Rowe (silversmith) was the winner of the Decorative Arts Award in1988 and a detail of the Tapestry Soft Flight by Mary Farmer graced the catalogue cover. The tapestry Soft Flight Is now in the Collection of the Victoria and Albert Museum.

With private transactions constituting an essential and increasingly profitable business segment, through the years Sotheby's has bought art galleries and helped dealers finance purchases. It has also gone into partnership with dealers on private sales. In 1990, Sotheby's teamed up with dealer William Acquavella, to form Acquavella Modern Art, a Nevada general partnership and a subsidiary of Sotheby's Holding Company. The subsidiary paid $143 million for the contents of the Pierre Matisse Gallery in Manhattan, which included about 2,300 works by artists including Miró, Jean Dubuffet, Alberto Giacometti, and Marc Chagall, and began selling the works both at auction and privately.

In 1996, Sotheby's acquired Andre Emmerich Gallery to operate a division called Emmerich/Sotheby's, As a consequence, the Josef and Anni Albers Foundation, the main beneficiary of the artists' estates, as well as the estates of Morris Louis and Milton Avery announced that they would not renew their Emmerich contracts. That decision came right after it was disclosed that Sotheby's had decided to close Emmerich's prime space at 41 East 57th Street, and that its artists would be handled out of Deitch Projects. Sotheby's subsequently closed Andre Emmerich in 1998.

In 1997, Sotheby's purchased a 50% interest in Deitch Projects but later sold its share back to Jeffrey Deitch. In 1997, it also bought Leslie Hindman Auctioneers in Chicago; by 2001, it stopped holding auctions in the city.

In 2006, Sotheby's acquired a Dutch dealership, Noortman Master Paintings, from its owner, Robert Noortman, for $82.5 million ($56.5 million worth of Sotheby's stock and assumption of more than $26 million in gallery debt, including $11.7 million owed to the auction house). Sotheby's and Noortman had collaborated before in 1995, when the sales of Dutch plastic millionaire Joost Ritman were divided between the two companies. Already in 1990, Sotheby's New York had successfully lobbied for a zoning change permitting the construction of a 27-story residential tower above the five-story headquarters; this expansion was never realised. Instead, Sotheby's throughout the 1990s expressed interest in sites that ranged from the old Alexander's building on East 59th Street to the New York Coliseum site on Columbus Circle, and was even considering moving into the old B. Altman Building on Fifth Avenue.

=== 21st century ===
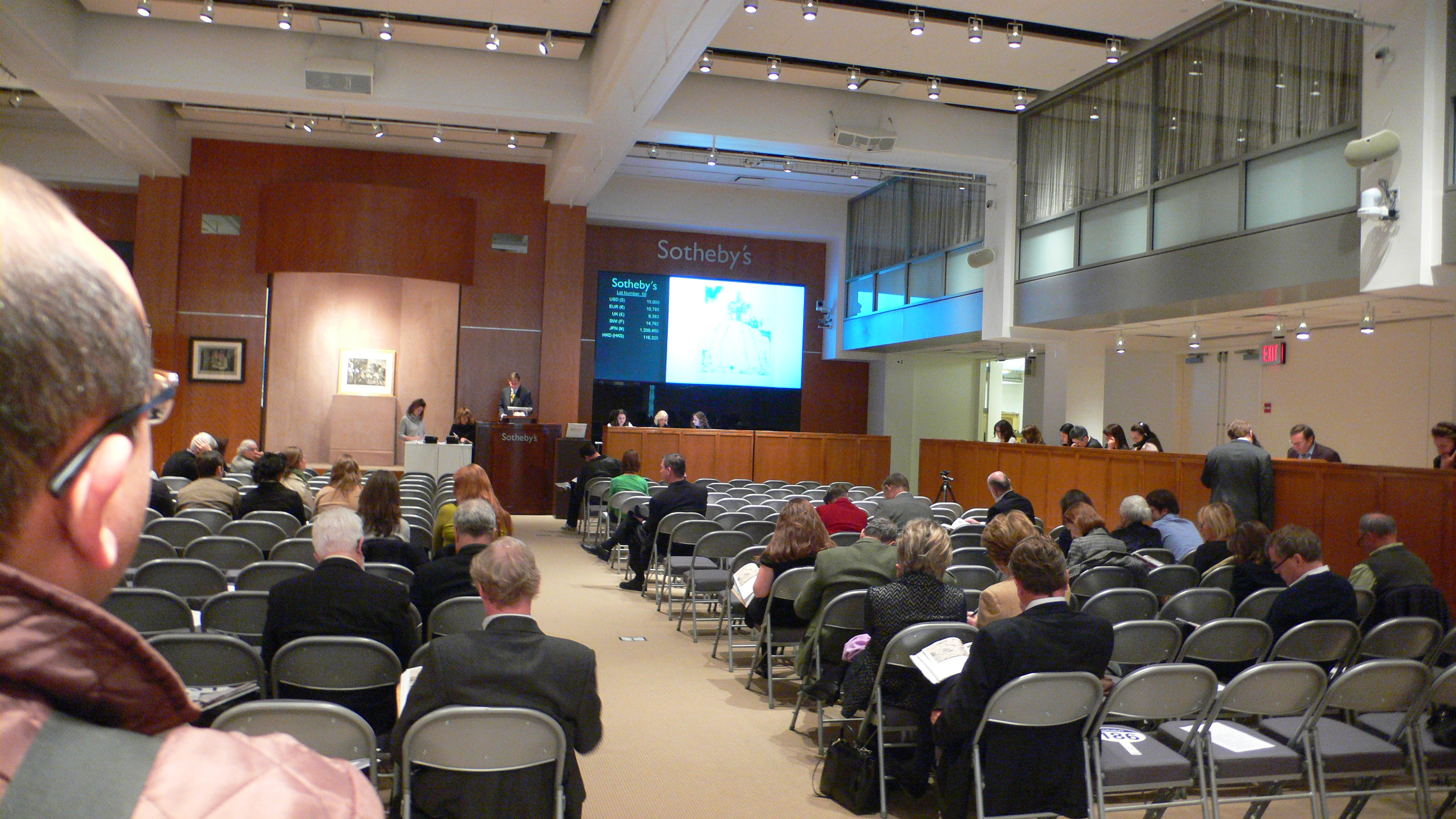
A fine art auction at Sotheby's in NYC, in 2010. Bidders could be physically present, or bid online or over the phone.

The company eventually bought its York Avenue building for $11 million in 2000 and completed a $140 million expansion and renovation in 2001, adding six floors and 240,000 square feet. The renovation added the capability to store works on the same premises as the specialist departments, galleries, and auction spaces. Sotheby's New York's offices also house Sotheby's Wine and the former Bid (an American contemporary restaurant and later bistro), which was closed due to poor attendance. The company sold the building in 2002 for $175 million. In May 2007, Sotheby's opened an office in Moscow in response to rapidly growing interest among Russian buyers in the international art market and held sales in Qatar in 2009.

As many industries took a blow from the economic crisis of 2008, the art market also saw a contraction. In international figures, art prices fell by 7.5% in Q1 of 2008 in comparison to the previous quarter. In September and October 2008, major auction houses saw a sharp decline in sales: artprice.com, the world leader in art market information, coined the term "Black October". Sotheby's bought-in rate was 27%, Christie's was 45% and Phillips de Pury's was 46%. However, the total values of global and United States Fine Art auction sales were US$8.3 billion and US$2.9 billion, respectively. In 2009, art collector Steven A. Cohen built a 6 percent stake in the auction house for his hedge fund SAC Capital Advisors.

In 2011, Noortman's Amsterdam space was closed and the gallery moved to London. Two years later, Sotheby's closed Noortmans, after having written down $8.3 million of inventory and started selling off lower-valued works of art through other auction houses. As of 2021, Sotheby's is present in over 40 countries, with 80 locations. In 2012, the company signed a 10-year joint-venture agreement to form Sotheby's (Beijing) Auction Co. Ltd., the first international auction house in China; under the agreement, it invested $1.2 million to take an 80 percent stake in the venture with state-owned Beijing Gehua Cultural Development Group.

As of 2012, the firm had an annual revenue of approximately US$831.8 million and offices on Manhattan's York Avenue and London's New Bond Street.

Sotheby's shares a rivalry with Christie's for the position of the world's pre-eminent fine art auctioneer, a title of much subjectivity. In August 2004, Sotheby's introduced an online system – MySotheby's – allowing clients to track lots and create "wishlists" that could be automatically updated as new works became available. Sotheby's also created the BIDnow service, which allows bidders to bid real-time online while watching the broadcast auctions, with the exception of Wine auctions. LiveBid is Sotheby's online bidding system exclusively for wine auctions.

In the meantime, income from classic auctioneering has fallen, as Sotheby's reported a decrease of 42% in net income in the first half of 2012.

In February 2015 Sotheby's acquired a 25% stake in classic and vintage automobile auctioneer RM Auctions.

In March 2015, Tad Smith, former president and chief executive of New York's Madison Square Garden, succeeded William F. Ruprecht as CEO of Sotheby's. Smith had no experience in the auction industry but had overseen a doubling of profits during his time at Madison Square Garden. In 2015, the auction house's longest-serving auctioneer, David Redden, and vice-chairman retired.

In 2016, the company spent $50 million on Art Agency Partners, run by Amy Cappellazzo, Allan Schwartzman and Adam Chinn. The price was shared among the trio, as well as $35 million performance-related bonus. The five-year contract expired in 2021.

In July 2016, Chinese insurance company Taikang Life became Sotheby's largest shareholder, with a 13.5% stake.

On 25 January 2018, Sotheby's acquired the AI company Thread Genius for an undisclosed amount.

In February 2019, Sotheby's announced a redesign and expansion of its New York headquarters on the Upper East Side that is being led by the designer Shohei Shigematsu of the Office for Metropolitan Architecture (OMA). The exhibition space there will grow to over 90,000 square feet from 67,000, and the project will include the addition of several new galleries. The company also launched a new online bidding platform on its website.

In June 2019, Sotheby's was acquired by French-Israeli businessman Patrick Drahi at a 61% market premium. In October 2019, he brought in Charles F. Stewart as Sotheby's new CEO, and former CEO Tad Smith transitioned to an advisory role. Drahi instituted a number of cost-cutting measures, including senior executive layoffs in 2019; job cuts, salary cuts, and a move to online auctions during the 2020 pandemic; and announcing an end to Sotheby's employee pension plan in 2022.

In 2020, Sotheby's overtook Christie's as the world's top auction house for the first time since 2011, with over $5 billion in aggregate sales compared to its rival's $4.4 billion.

As of late 2021, Drahi's son, Nathan Drahi, was the managing director of Sotheby's Asia.

In June 2023, Sotheby's agreed to purchase 945 Madison Avenue, a former museum building designed by Marcel Breuer, to house the company's headquarters, including its galleries, exhibition space, and auction room. The company plans to open its new space in 2025.

== History of public and private ownership ==
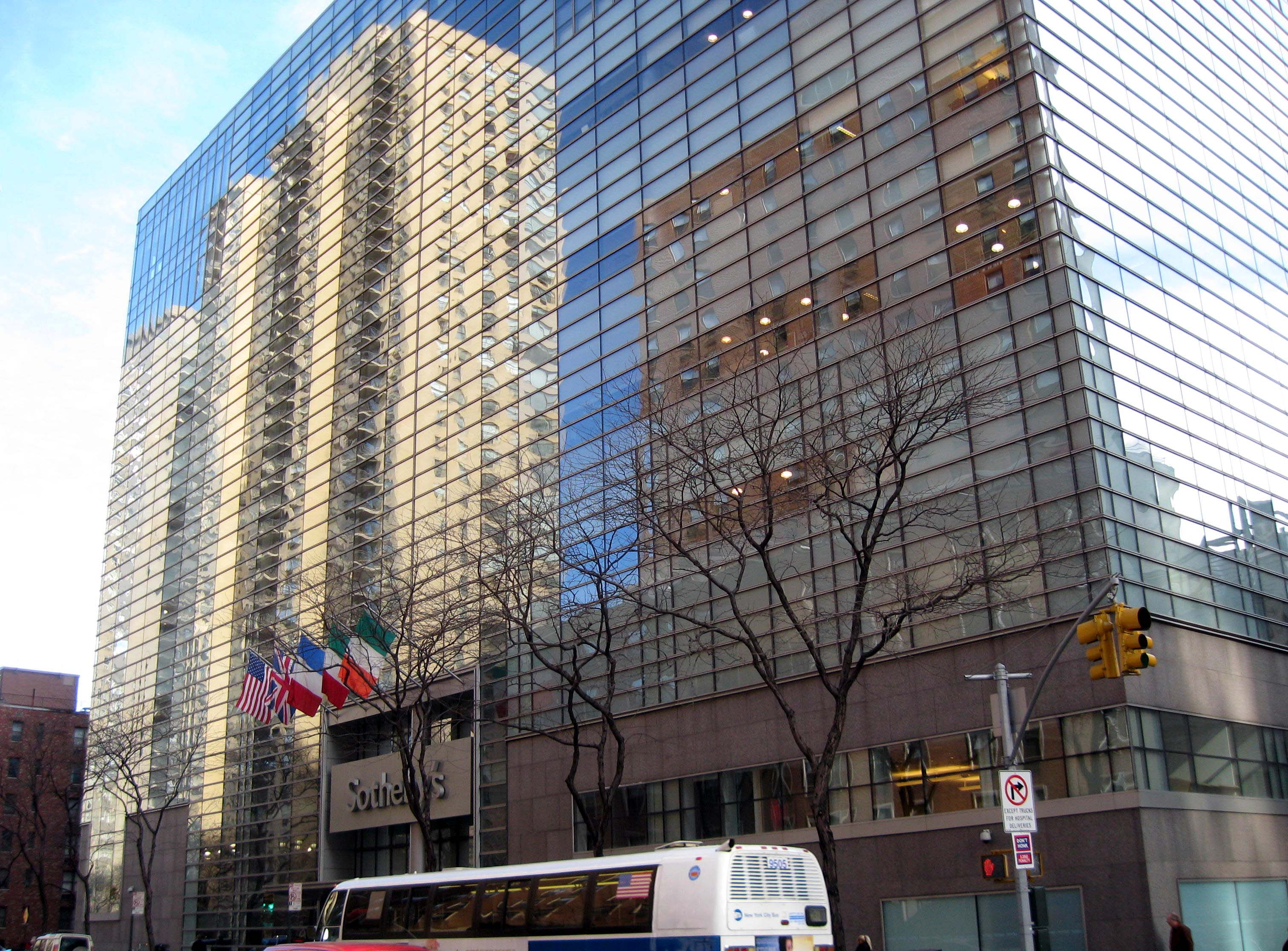
York Avenue headquarters, New York City

Sotheby's became a UK public company in 1977. In 1980, after a drop in sales, Sotheby's relocated its North American headquarters from Madison Avenue to a former cigar factory at 1334 York Avenue, New York. In 1982, the auction house closed its Madison Avenue galleries at East 76th Street, and its Los Angeles galleries were sold and West Coast auctions moved to New York.

In 1983, a group of investors including American millionaire Alfred Taubman purchased and privatized Sotheby's. Sotheby's was initially incorporated as Sotheby's Holdings, Inc. in Michigan in August 1983.

In 1988, Taubman took Sotheby's public and listed the company's shares on the New York Stock Exchange (NYSE), making Sotheby's the oldest publicly traded company on the NYSE under the ticker symbol "BID". In June 2006, Sotheby's Holdings, Inc. reincorporated in the State of Delaware and was renamed Sotheby's shortly after.

In 2019 Sotheby's was acquired by Patrick Drahi for $3.7 billion, becoming again a private company and no longer trading on the NYSE.

In 2024 the Abu Dhabi sovereign wealth fund ADIA acquired a minority stake in Sotheby's, with a total investment of approximately $1 billion in the house.

== Auction process ==
Sotheby's auctions are usually held during the day. The majority are free and open to the public, with the exception of occasional evening auctions, which require tickets. Attendees have no obligation to bid.

Bidding finishes when only one bidder remains willing to purchase the lot at the bidder's declared price. The auctioneer "knocks down" the lot, declaring it sold to the winning bidder. The winning bid for a lot is also called the hammer price. Sotheby's organises the delivery of the lot in private with the buyer.

=== Buying ===
Buyers can find out what is for sale at Sotheby's by browsing e-catalogues, visiting pre-sale exhibitions, purchasing print catalogues and registering for e-mail alerts. Buyers can register to bid in person at Sotheby's offices, or online. Sotheby's requires that prospective buyers provide government-issued proof of identity and sometimes a bank reference. There are four ways buyers can bid: in person at the auction rooms, by telephone, bid live online or make an absentee bid online. When a bid is successful, Sotheby's calculates and sums the hammer price, the buyer's premium and taxes.

=== Selling ===
Sellers are required to submit an Auction Estimate Form, providing thorough information and a photograph of the item. Once accepted for auction, the seller and Sotheby's sign a contract, which sets out the reserve price and the seller's commission. If bidding on a seller's lot does not reach the reserve price, the item is not sold.

== Service categories ==
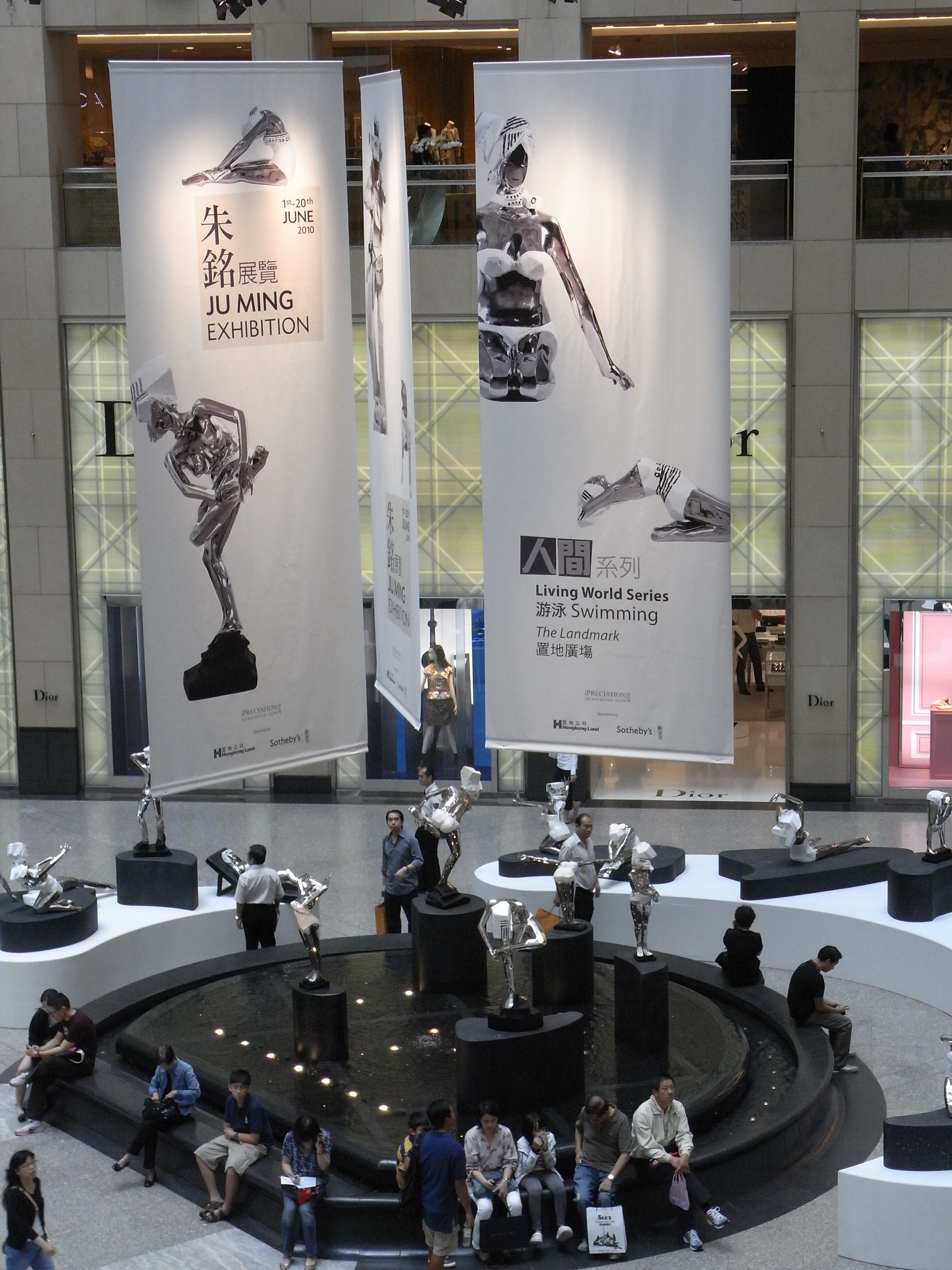
HK Central Landmark 朱銘 Ju Ming art exhibition interior Sotheby's

As of April 2021, Sotheby's listed the following services:

- Advisory
- Fiduciary client group
- Global partnerships
- Financial services/lending
- Fine art storage
- Post sale services
- Private sales
- Restitution
- Scientific research
- Tax, heritage and UK museums
- Valuations
- Wine advisory services

Private sales

Sotheby's links sellers with prospective buyers in private if sellers do not want a public auction. The identities of buyers and consignors are not disclosed. Sotheby's Private Sales works with clients with confidentiality and tailors the buying and selling process in a private setting. Private Sales accounted for 16.5% of all Sotheby's sales in 2011. That year, Sotheby's inaugurated a new gallery space called S2 at its York Avenue headquarters with a show of work by American abstract painter Sam Francis. Unlike Haunch of Venison, a gallery that Christie's bought in 2007, S2 is solely devoted to showcasing the auction house's private sales. In 2013, Sotheby's opened a gallery for private sales close to its branch in London, in a five-story block at 31 George Street. The auction house also conducts private sales through its selling exhibitions of monumental sculpture at Chatsworth House, Derbyshire, and at the Singapore Botanic Gardens.

Financial services

Established in 1988, Sotheby's Financial Services offers loans for consigned property and loans against the value of client's items through customized terms. The auction house also makes term loans, for a defined period of time, on works that clients are not planning to sell, in part to "establish or enhance mutually beneficial relationships with borrowers" that can lead to future consignments. While traditional lenders such as banks provide loans at a lower cost to borrowers, Sotheby's said in its 2011 annual report, few will accept works of art as the sole collateral.

Picture library

Sotheby's Picture Library contained images in a variety of formats available for licensing, and was one of the image suppliers to various databases such as the British Association of Picture Libraries and Agencies (BAPLA). However, only the image archive mentioned on the Sotheby's website as of April 2021 is an out-of-date reference to the Cecil Beaton Studio Archive, which Cecil Beaton sold to Sotheby's in 1977.

Wine

In October 2019, Sotheby's launched Sotheby's Own Label Collection, a line of a dozen wines. The project took two years to complete, and is based on Sotheby's best-selling wines, both those represented in-store and on its e-commerce platform. Additionally, the collection reflects some of the long-standing relationships Sotheby's has with producers around the world. The Sotheby's Wine Encyclopedia has been published in several editions since 1988, written by Tom Stevenson.

Other

Sotheby's has produced a bimonthly online magazine since November–December 2018, Sotheby's Magazine.

== Partners and subsidiaries ==
=== Sotheby's Institute of Art ===
In 1969, Sotheby's founded Sotheby's Institute of Art in London. The Institute now offers full-time accredited master's degrees as well as a range of online and other courses.

=== Sotheby's International Realty ===
Sotheby's International Realty is a luxury real estate brand founded in 1976 by Sotheby's. It operates as a franchise.

=== RM Sotheby's ===
RM Sotheby's deals in classic cars, headquartered in Canada with offices across the US and Europe. Formerly RM Auctions, the company has been part-owned by Sotheby's since 2015.

== Sotheby's Prize ==
The Sotheby's Prize, launched in 2017, is a $250,000 annual award given to museums that exhibit what are vaguely described as "groundbreaking shows". The inaugural winners were Many Tongues: Art, Language and Revolution in the Middle East and South Asia curated by Omer Kholeif of the Museum of Contemporary Art in Chicago and Pop América: Contesting Freedom, 1965–1975 curated by Esther Gabara of the Nasher Museum. The Sotheby's Prize program concluded in 2020, following a promise to honor existing commitments to shows that are still in formation.

== Notable sales ==
=== Auctioned artwork ===
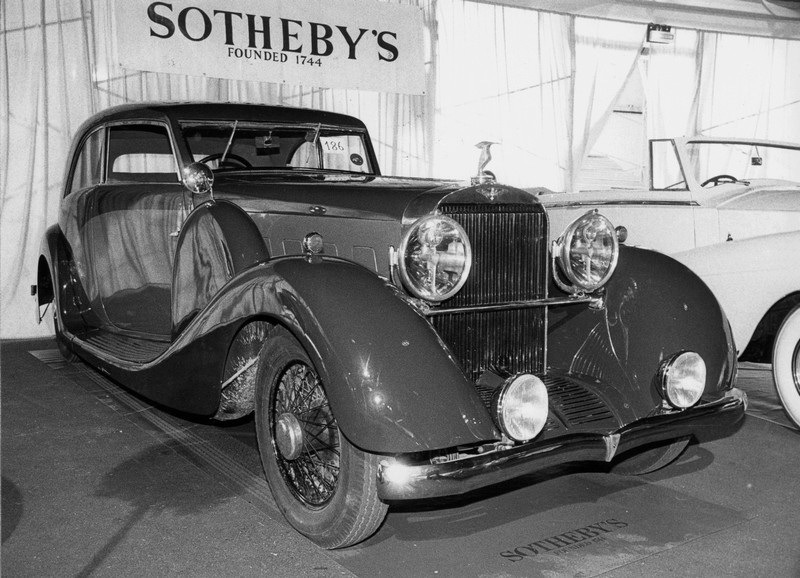
Hispano J12 1933 coach Pourtout—Sotheby's 1989

Sotheby's has set, then later reset, a number of world records for auctioned works of art. The following monetary values are given in United States dollars.

- On 22 May 2002, Norman Rockwell's original painting of Rosie the Riveter was sold for $4.96 million.
- On 3 May 2006, Sotheby's auctioned Pablo Picasso's Dora Maar au Chat for $95 million, becoming the second-most-expensive artwork ever sold at auction at that time.
- On 7 June 2007, a Roman bronze sculpture of Artemis and the Stag was sold at Sotheby's for $28.6 million, setting the new record as the most expensive sculpture as well as work from antiquity ever sold at auction at that time.
- Sotheby's holds the world record for most expensive piece of contemporary art ever sold at auction, with Mark Rothko's 1950 White Center (Yellow, Pink and Lavender on Rose), grossing $72.8 million in May 2007.
- Sotheby's set a new world record, at that time, for the most expensive auctioned work by a living artist, bringing in $17 million at a November 1986 auction of Out the Window by Jasper Johns, the first auction over $10 million in this category.
  - While Sotheby's and Christie's surpassed each other over time, Sotheby's reclaimed the record with the first auction over $20 million in this category, Jeff Koons' Hanging Heart (Magenta/Gold), which grossed $23.6 million in a November 2007 sale.
  - Sotheby's retook this record, at that time, on 12 October 2012, with the first auction over $30 million in this category, when a 1994 painting from the Abstraktes Bilder series by Gerhard Richter, Abstraktes Bild (809–4), was sold for $34 million.
- On 6 December 2007, Sotheby's auctioned the Guennol Lioness, a 3 1/4-inch limestone lion from ancient Mesopotamia. It is thought to be at least 5,000 years old. It was sold for $57 million, fetching the highest price ever paid for at an auction for a sculpture.
- On 15 December 2007, Sotheby's auctioned one of only seven copies of The Tales of Beedle the Bard, written by J. K. Rowling. The book was purchased for a hammer price of $3.8 million. Each leather bound copy was hand written and illustrated by Rowling, with six given to her close friends and the seventh sent to auction with proceeds going to The Children's Voice charity.
- On 19 December 2007, Sotheby's auctioned a 710-year-old copy of Magna Carta, the last remaining copy in private hands out of the 17 that are known to exist. The copy sold for $21.3 million.
- On 3 February 2010, the sculpture L'Homme qui marche I by Alberto Giacometti sold for $103.7 million at a London auction, at that time setting a new world record for a work of art sold at auction.
- On 2 May 2012, a version of the painting The Scream was sold for $119.9 million.
- On 11 November 2014, the Patek Philippe Henry Graves Supercomplication became the most expensive watch ever sold at auction, reaching a final price of $23.98 million in Geneva.
- On 2 June 2016, Pablo Picasso's Femme Assise sold for $63.7 million at Sotheby's in London, making it the most expensive Cubist painting ever sold at auction.
- On 10 July 2018, E. H. Shepard's original 1926 illustrated map of the Hundred Acre Wood, which features in the opening pages of A. A. Milne's Winnie-the-Pooh, sold for £430,000 ($600,000) in London, setting a record for a book illustration.
- On 5 October 2018, Banksy's Girl with a Balloon began to 'shred' itself shortly after hammering down at the artist's auction record. The work was later sold again with the new title Love Is in the Bin for £18.5 million, an artist's record for Banksy after the previous record of £16.5 million set in March that year.
- On 14 May 2019, Claude Monet's Meules was sold for over $110 million.
- On 25 October 2021, Sotheby's auctioned 11 Picasso's previously belonging to Steve Wynn for $109 million in a pop-up salesroom in Las Vegas.
- On 6 September 2023, Freddie Mercury's Yamaha baby grand piano, which he used to compose "Bohemian Rhapsody" among other Queen songs, sold for £1.7 million ($2.1 million), which Sotheby's state is a record for a composer's piano. The month-long exhibition in London, Freddie Mercury: A World of His Own, saw almost 1,500 items of Mercury's sold across six auctions, taking in a total £39.9 million ($50.4 million) and surpassing a previous mark set by David Bowie.
- On November 18, 2026, Sotheby’s sold Vincent van Gogh’s Blossoming Chestnut Trees at its New York auction room in the Breuer Building for $190.4 million including fees, setting an auction record for the artist.

=== Sneaker sales ===
In recent years, Sotheby's has been selling sneakers, both vintage designs in a "buy-now" sneaker shop, and high-value pairs, some worn by famous people, by auction. Sneaker auctions have brought in large numbers new to Sotheby's, from as young as 19 years old and across the world. Notable auction record-breaking sales include:

- July 2019, Nike 1972 Nike Waffle Racing Flat "Moon Shoe", US$437,500
- 17 May 2020, Michael Jordan's autographed Nike "Air Jordan 1"s from 1985 sold for US$560,000
- April 2021, Nike Air Yeezy 1 worn by Kanye West at the 2008 Grammy Awards, US$1.8 million. This was the first pair of sneakers reported anywhere selling for more than US$1 million. They were bought by the specialist sneaker-investing platform RARES.

=== Fossils ===
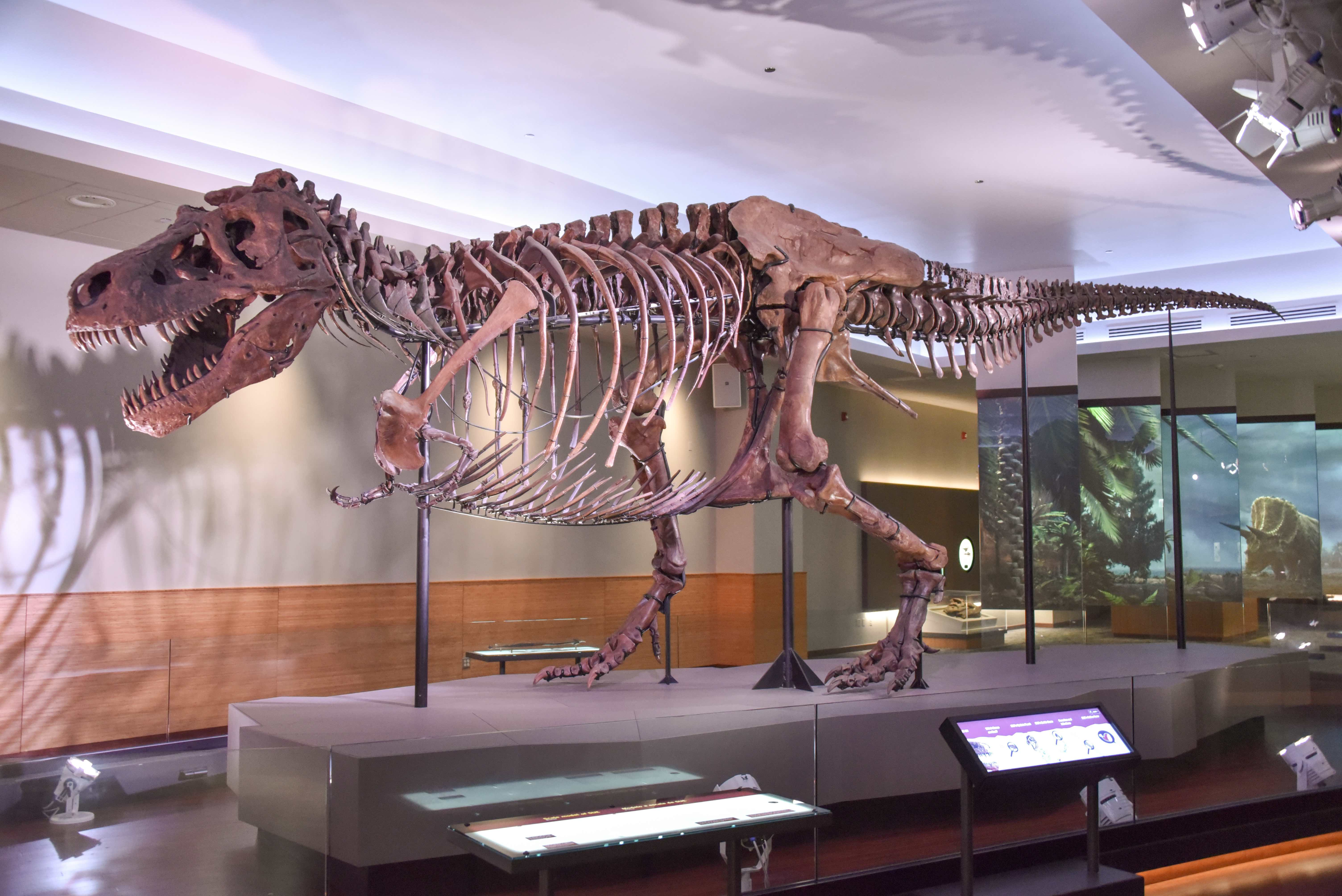
Sue (FMNH 2081) on display at the Field Museum

- In October 1997, Sotheby's auctioned and sold Sue, the world's largest and most complete Tyrannosaurus rex skeleton. Although academic palaeontologists feared that the specimen would enter private hands and become "lost" to science forever, financial assistance from wealthy patrons such as Disney and McDonald's allowed the Field Museum of Natural History to buy the skeleton for over $8 million. Beginning with the sale of Sue, Sotheby's has attracted controversy regarding the commercialization of scientifically important fossils. Controversy around the subject has since reignited with each subsequent sale of a high-profile fossil by Sotheby's.
- On 9 December 2022, Sotheby's sold a highly complete T. rex skull named Maximus at a price of over $6 million.
- On 17 July 2024, Sotheby's auctioneer Phyllis Kao sold Apex, the world's most complete Stegosaurus skeleton, for US$44.6 million. This set a new world record for any dinosaur skeleton or fossil ever sold at auction at the time. The buyer, Kenneth Griffin, has temporarily loaned the skeleton to the American Museum of Natural History.
- In June 2025, Sotheby's announced the auction of a highly complete specimen of Ceratosaurus. It is one of the few Ceratosaurus specimens in existence, and the only known juvenile. The skeleton was acquired from the Museum of Ancient Life in Utah. The skeleton subsequently sold for US$30.5 million.
- In July 2026, Sotheby's sold Gus, a highly complete T. rex skeleton, for US$50.1 million.
- In 27 October 2026, Sotheby's held the re-auction of Jodi (formerly Chomper), a highly complete Nanotyrannus specimen previously thought to be a juvenile T. rex when it was first auctioned in 2023. The price was initially estimated at $6–9 million. At auction, it was sold for US$47.3 million.

=== Jewellery ===
On 9 July 2021, Sotheby's sold a 101.38-carat diamond for $12.3 million in cryptocurrency. The sale became the most expensive physical object ever publicly offered for purchase with cryptocurrency at the time.

=== Porcelain ===
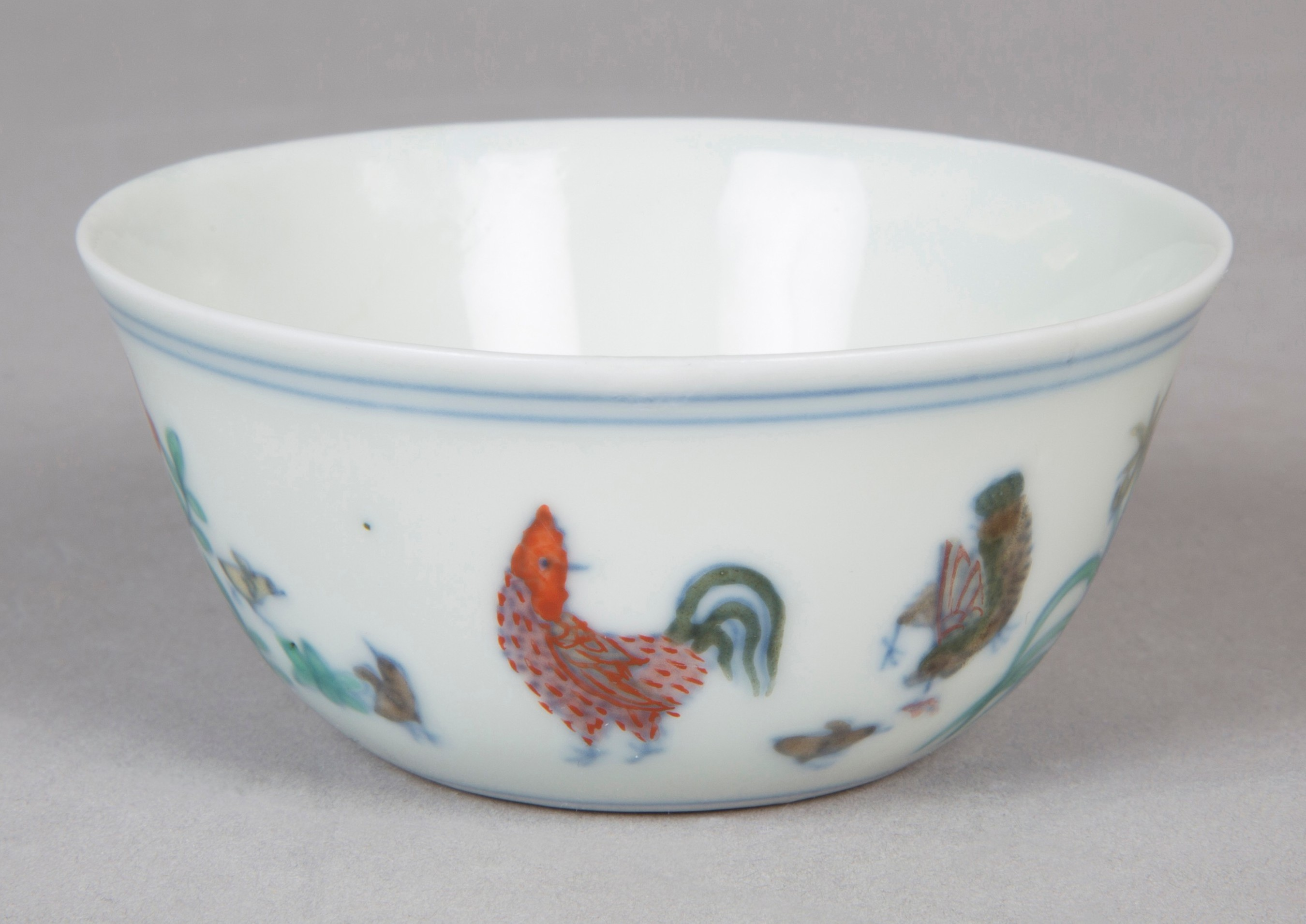
Chenghua chicken cup in Jingdezhen ware cup; this one in the Metropolitan Museum of Art

In recent years Sotheby's, mostly in Hong Kong sales, has become the leading auctioneer for the most expensive Chinese porcelain. On 3 October 2017, a Ru ware brush-washer dish, 13 cm (5 in) across, set a new record auction price for Chinese ceramics at Sotheby's Hong Kong, fetching HK$294.3 million, nearly US$38 million. Earlier, On 4 April 2012 Sotheby's Hong Kong sold another Ru ware brush-washer bowl, 13.6 cm across and the pair of one in the British Museum, for 207,860,000 Hong Kong Dollars ($US 26.7 million), then an auction record for Song dynasty ceramics. It had been in a Japanese collection, after belonging to the collection of Mr & Mrs Alfred Clark in London.

The very rare Chenghua chicken cups have recently only been offered for sale at Sotheby's auctions. On August 8, 2014, Sotheby's conducted a seven-sale series of Chinese ceramics in Hong Kong. A Chenghua chicken cup from the private Meiyintang collection of Chinese ceramics was sold at the auction for a record US$36.05 million (HK $281.24 million) to Shanghainese billionaire Liu Yiqian. This was the highest auction price for any Chinese Porcelain. The previous record for was held by a Qing Dynasty vase which sold for US$32.4 million in 2010. The estimated pre-sale price for the Chicken Cup was recorded at US$38.6 million in 2010. The chicken cup was previously sold in 1980 in Hong Kong for US$1.08 million (HK $5.28 million), as well as in 1999, where it also established a record price for Chinese porcelain at US$3.70 million (HK $29.17 million).

In November 2024 A pair of rare Ming Dynasty wucai fish jars dating from the 16th century sold for £9.6 million ($12.5 million) at auction, higher than their estimate of £1 million ($1.3 million).They are the only known pair to survive complete with their covers.

== Controversies ==
=== Illegal antiquities ===
==== 1990s scandal ====
In 1991 and 1997, an edition of ITV's The Cook Report and Channel 4 Dispatches programme alleged that Sotheby's had been trading in antiquities with no published provenance, and that the organisation continued to use dealers involved in the smuggling of artifacts. From the late 1980s through to the early 1990s, the antiquities department in London was managed by Brendan Lynch and Oliver Forge. Lynch travelled to India frequently and bought unprovenanced pieces from Vaman Ghiya in Rajasthan, which turned out to be stolen from temples and other sites. British historian and journalist Peter Watson wrote Sotheby's: The Inside Story (1997), outlining these illicit activities, which he also exposed on CBS's 60 Minutes. As a result of this exposé, Sotheby's commissioned their own report into illegal antiquities, and made assurances that only legal items with published provenance would be traded in the future. It ceased its regular Asian art sales in London said that they would henceforth only be selling Asian pieces from New York, where their legitimacy could be better monitored. Forge and Lynch were removed from their posts but never charged, and they opened a consultancy in London and continued to trade.

In India, Ghiya was eventually arrested in 2003, only convicted in 2008 and sentenced to life in prison; however, in 2014 an Indian High Court quashed the conviction. Some of the illicit Asian pieces found their way to the National Gallery of Australia, and from there a piece known as "Dancing Shiva" found its way to the Art Gallery of South Australia. After doubts were raised and the piece became the object of an investigation beginning in 2014, it was established that it was most likely a stolen piece, and was repatriated to India in 2019.

==== Cambodian statue (2012) ====
In 2012, the U.S. Immigration and Customs Enforcement moved to seize a 10th-century Cambodian sandstone statue from Sotheby's, alleging in a civil complaint before the United States District Court for the Southern District of New York that the company had put the work up for auction "despite knowing that it had been stolen from a temple" in Koh Ker.

=== Price-fixing scandal (2000) ===
In February 2000, A. Alfred Taubman and Diana (Dede) Brooks, the CEO of the company, stepped down amidst a price-fixing scandal. The FBI had been investigating auction practices in which it was revealed that collusion involving commission fixing between Christie's and Sotheby's was occurring. In October 2000, Brooks admitted her guilt in hopes of receiving a reduced sentence, implicating Taubman. In December 2001, jurors in a high-profile New York City courtroom found Taubman guilty of conspiracy. He served ten months of a one-year sentence in prison, while Brooks received a six-month home confinement and a penalty of US$350,000. Sotheby's was sentenced to pay a fine of US$45 million. No staff from Christie's were charged.

Growing out of the four-year criminal antitrust investigation by the United States Department of Justice, some 130,000 buyers and sellers filed class-action lawsuit, arguing they were cheated in the price-fixing conspiracy by Sotheby's and Christie's. In 2001, the United States District Court for the Southern District of New York gave final approval to a US$512 million agreement. The structure of the settlement was said to have helped stave off insolvency for both companies, especially the publicly held Sotheby's.

At the time of the scandal, 59 percent of the company's Class A shares were owned by Baron Funds.

=== Auction error (2011) ===
On 10 March 2011, Sotheby's sold a pair of sconces incorrectly attributed to Emile-Jacques Ruhlmann.

=== Artists' authorship rights (2012) ===
In 2012, art dealer Marc Jancou filed suit in the Supreme Court of the State of New York, suing both Sotheby's and artist Cady Noland after the auction house pulled a work he had consigned by the artist from a sale, apparently at her request. The suit argued that this presented a breach of the consignment agreement. Noland had told Sotheby's there were problems with the condition of her painting Cowboys Milking (1990), estimated to sell for between US$260,000 and $350,000. Jancou sued Sotheby's for US$6 million in compensatory damages, and Noland for US$20 million in punitive damages. Both Sotheby's and Noland argued withdrawing the work from auction was well within the artist's rights under the Visual Artists Rights Act (VARA) and New York's Artists' Authorship Rights Act (AARA).

=== Activist investor dispute (2013–2014) ===
From October 2013 to May 2014, Sotheby's was the target of activist investor Daniel S. Loeb via his hedge fund Third Point Management, which owned the largest shareholder stake in the publicly traded company. Loeb criticized a number of the company's strategies and managerial practices, asked for three seats (himself, Harry Wilson, and Olivier Reza) on the board of directors, and demanded the resignation of chairman and CEO Bill Ruprecht. In response, to ward off the threat Sotheby's initiated a "poison pill" shareholder rights plan barring any shareholder from acquiring more than 10% of its stock. By April 2014, hedge fund Marcato Capital Management and investor advisory firm Institutional Shareholder Services also supported most of Loeb's positions. In early May 2014, Sotheby's and Loeb came to an agreement whereby it enlarged its board and he gained the requested three seats, the poison pill was ended, Ruprecht remained in his position, and Third Point was allowed to increase its holdings of Sotheby's up to 15%.

=== Industrial dispute (2015) ===
Sotheby's London auction house had outsourced its cleaning and other support services to Contract Cleaning and Maintenance (London) Limited (CCML). In early 2015, the UVW union initiated a formal trade dispute over low pay, insufficient sick pay, and issues summarised in an Early Day Motion signed by 24 Members of Parliament, highlighting:

the unwarranted suspension of a porter following a grievance he made about poor treatment, the refusal to stop using certain chemicals which leave cleaners with breathing difficulties, chest pains and rashes, the unwarranted deduction of wages and working hours, overworking and shouting at porters and cleaners, reprimanding a porter for using the toilet outside his official break time, threatening a cleaner with suspension for not being clean shaven

After CCML conceded the majority of UVW's demands, Sotheby's decided to contract all support services to a new company, Servest. This backfired when UVW staged a noisy, sit-down protest outside the Sotheby's entrance while clients arrived for a record-breaking summer night of contemporary art auctions, including lots by Andy Warhol and Francis Bacon. Four workers were suspended and investigated for their involvement in the protest, which led to another Early Day Motion signed by 42 MPs, condemning:

that Sotheby's and Servest consider peaceful protest to be an act of misconduct; further condemns Sotheby's decision to ban from the site cleaners and porters who took part in a lawful, peaceful protest to call for a real Living Wage, contractual sick pay and an end to trade union victimisation

With only two of the four workers reinstated, another UVW protest disrupted a Sotheby's classic car auction in London's Battersea. In February 2016 Sotheby's and Servest reached an agreement to pay all outsourced workers the London Living Wage and improved sick pay.

=== Controversies involving Yves Bouvier (2016–2023) ===
In 2016, three New York art traders – Warren Adelson, president of Adelson Galleries, as well as New York-based art dealers Alexander Parish and Robert Simon – planned to sue Sotheby's for alleged fraud over the resale of Leonardo da Vinci's Salvator Mundi, which they sold through Sotheby's in 2013 for $80 million. After learning that the buyer of the painting, Swiss art dealer Yves Bouvier, sold it on to Russian billionaire Dmitry Rybolovlev for $127.5 million, the traders felt deceived by the auction house as to the painting's true value. According to court papers, the traders inquired whether Sotheby's knew the artwork could have been sold for more, and whether they were "misled into selling the work for a smaller amount by Sotheby's because Bouvier is an esteemed client." Sotheby's filed a preemptive lawsuit stating it had complied with all applicable rules and regulations, and the dispute between the auction house and the art dealers was settled quietly out of court.

In 2018, in a connected case, Rybolovlev sued Sotheby's for $380 million in damages for this alleged collusion with Bouvier, claiming the company "materially assisted the largest art fraud in history" whereby Sotheby's vice chairman of private sales worldwide provided assessments forwarded to Rybolovlev which overinflated the valuations of artworks while at the same time being aware of the much lower prices Bouvier paid for them privately through Sotheby's. Rybolovlev alleged that Yves Bouvier defrauded him out of $1 billion through this practice, over several years. In the Rybolovlev legal proceedings, in 2019 New York courts ordered Sotheby's to produce documents to be used in foreign criminal proceedings regarding the Bouvier Affair in Switzerland and Monaco.

In March 2023, a New York judge ruled that Sotheby's must face trial on fraud charges regarding four of the 15 artworks that Rybolovlev sued Sotheby's over: Salvator Mundi by da Vinci, Le Domaine d’Arnheim by Magritte, Wasserschlangen II by Klimt, and Tête by Modigliani. The ruling also allowed Rybolovlev to pursue an aiding and abetting claim against Sotheby's regarding Salvator Mundi. Upon the recommendation of the judge, both parties subsequently agreed to settle the case via mediation with a magistrate judge in order to avoid a jury trial.

=== Secrecy on Nazi-looted art ===
Numerous artworks looted from Jews by the Nazis during the Holocaust passed through Sotheby's with incomplete provenances.

In 2013, a collector sued Sotheby's for having sold him Nazi-looted art, saying that the cloud over the title made the painting unsaleable.

In 2016, letters were subpoenaed from Sotheby's concerning a claim for restitution for a Modigliani painting.

In 2017 Poland demanded transparency from Sotheby's concerning a painting slated for auction, alleging that the paintings had been stolen during World War II.

In 2024 a judge ordered Sotheby's to share the name of the client who had put a Nazi-looted painting by Tiepolo up for auction. The 18th century “St. Francis of Paola Holding a Rosary, Book, and Staff” was looted from the Jewish art dealer Otto Fröhlich, and his heirs identified the artwork at Sotheby's.

== See also ==
- List of oldest fine art auction houses
- Lorna Kelly, auctioneering
- Love Is in the Bin, Banksy painting sold by Sotheby's in 2018 and then again in 2021
- Peter Wilson (auctioneer), former chairman
- The Sotheby's Wine Encyclopedia
