= Laetitia Krupa =

French political journalist (1975–2024)

- Born: 29 June 1975
- Died: 20 March 2024 (aged 48)
- Education: French Press Institute; Institut d'études politiques de Bordeaux
- Occupation: Political journalist
- Children: 1

Laetitia Krupa (29 June 1975 – 20 March 2024) was a French political journalist.

== Biography ==
Born on 29 June 1975, Krupa's parents were scientists. She graduated from the French Press Institute and the Institut d'études politiques de Bordeaux. She began her career with Radio France before joining i>Télé in 2001. A field reporter, she collaborated on the show + Clair for Canal+, presented by Charlotte Le Grix de La Salle. She left the channel in 2009 and became a columnist for the Thomas Hugues-led show Médias, le mag on France 5. In 2016, she joined Ruth Elkrief's broadcast on BFM TV where she discussed the candidates of the 2017 French presidential election. She also wrote several articles for Le Journal du Dimanche and became a correspondent for Le Débat des grandes voix, presented by Nathalie Levy on Europe 1.

In 2020, Krupa became one of several columnists on season 14 of On n'est pas couché, presented by Laurent Ruquier on France 2. In May 2021, she had the book La Tentation du Clown : Comment un candidat hors système va bouleverser la présidentielle published by Buchet-Chastel, detailing Éric Zemmour as a potential candidate in the 2022 French presidential election. She then joined Public Sénat as a political editorialist for Sens public, a new show presented by Thomas Hugues. She hosted a podcast titled C tout com alongside Gaspard Gantzer for France Info.

In January 2023, she announced her resignation from television for health reasons.

== Death ==
Laetitia Krupa died following a long illness on 20 March 2024, at the age of 48. She had a daughter named Rose.

== Documentaries ==
- Alice et Aristide (2015)

== Books ==
- La Tentation du Clown : Comment un candidat hors système va bouleverser la présidentielle (2021)
