= Éric Brunet =

French journalist and television presenter (born 1964)

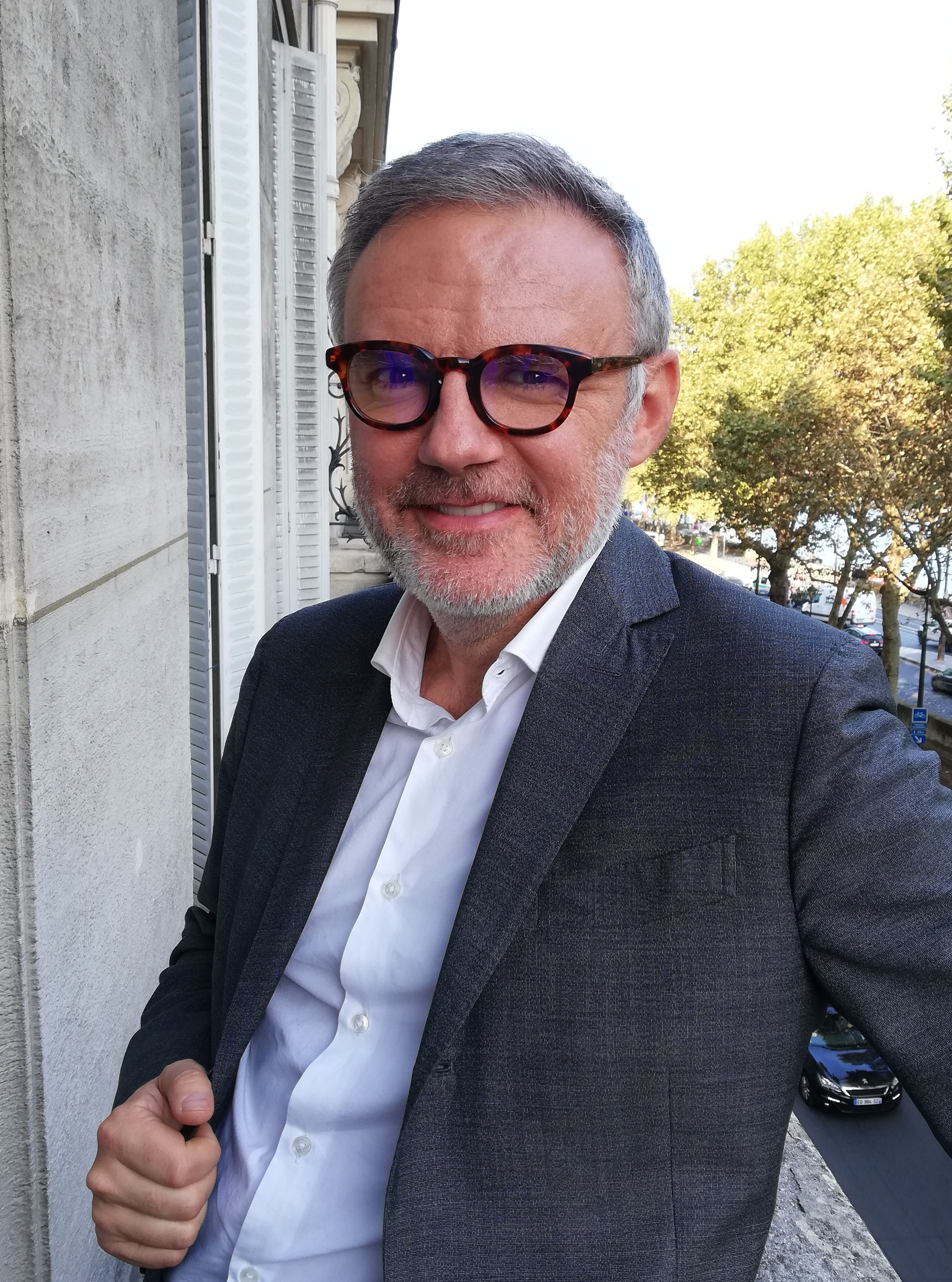
- Brunet in 2018
- Born: 22 July 1964 (age 62); Chinon, France
- Education: University of Tours; Panthéon-Assas University; French Press Institute
- Occupations: Journalist writer polemist
- Employers: BFM TV (past); RMC (past); LCI

Éric Brunet (French pronunciation: [eʁik bʁynɛ]; born 22 July 1964) is a French author, political commentator and radio host. In 2010, he started hosting Radio Brunet, known as Carrément Brunet until 2016, on RMC with 700,000 daily listeners as of 2018. In 2020, Brunet joined La Chaîne Info as host of Brunet Direct and Brunet & les Agitateurs.

== Career ==
Brunet grew up in Nantes. He studied at the French Press Institute and Panthéon-Assas University. From 2012, he regularly appeared on BFM TV, most notably in shows hosted by Apolline de Malherbe; starting 2018, he was the host of Brunet Vendredi 19h on Fridays.

He has also regularly appeared as a guest on Jean-Jacques Bourdin's daily radio show on RMC, Bourdin Direct, from 2014. Brunet published several books and opinion articles, in various magazines including L'Express and Valeurs Actuelles; he is best known abroad for calling France "irreformable".

In 2020, he left BFM TV and RMC to join La Chaîne Info as a columnist and host of the two-hour 10 a.m. weekdays show Brunet Direct and Brunet & les Agitateurs on Friday evenings.

== Honours ==
Following a proposition of Édouard Courtial, a member of the National Assembly for Oise, he was made a Knight of the Legion of Honour in 2012 by the Ministry of Culture, as part of its annual promotion.

== Works ==
=== Non-fiction ===
- Brunet, Éric (1996). Enquête chez les SM : six mois chez les sadomasos. Paris: Albin Michel. ISBN 9782226087041. OCLC 300163218.
- Brunet, Éric (1998). La bêtise administrative : excès, absurdités, bavures et autres scandales. Paris: Albin Michel. ISBN 9782226099761. OCLC 40121772.
- Brunet, Éric (1999). 60 millions de cobayes : consommateurs, vous êtes en danger. Paris: Albin Michel. ISBN 9782226108029. OCLC 406917847.
- Brunet, Éric (2006). Être de droite : un tabou français. Paris: Albin Michel. ISBN 9782226170835. OCLC 66236033.
- Brunet, Éric (2007). Être riche : un tabou français. Paris: Albin Michel. ISBN 9782226175120. OCLC 173842694.
- Brunet, Éric (2010). Dans la tête d'un réac. Paris: Nil. ISBN 9782841114566. OCLC 668372239.
- Brunet, Éric (2012). Pourquoi Sarko va gagner. Paris: Albin Michel. ISBN 9782226238658. OCLC 772498535.
- Brunet, Éric (2013). Sauve qui peut!. Paris: Albin Michel. ISBN 9782226243874. OCLC 853443863.

=== Novel ===
- Brunet, Éric (2015). Un monstre à la française. Paris: JC Lattès. ISBN 9782709647687. OCLC 908014531.
