= Apolline de Malherbe =

French broadcast journalist (born 1980)

- Born: 2 June 1980 (age 45); 16th arrondissement of Paris, France
- Education: Sciences Po
- Occupations: Television presenter, journalist
- Years active: 2007–present
- Employer: BFM TV

Apolline de Malherbe (born 2 June 1980) is a French broadcast journalist who is a presenter on the 24-hour rolling news and weather channel BFM TV.

== Biography ==
=== Education ===
After studying the humanities, de Malherbe completed a MAS in social politics at Sciences Po, along with a master's degree in public service. She put her MAS degree to use by analysing politicians who appeared in the television programmes of Marc-Olivier Fogiel and Thierry Ardisson. A politically left-wing woman, she supported the presidential candidacy of Jean-Pierre Chevènement in 2002. During this campaign, Apolline de Malherbe was a member of the pôle républicain group, which worked to criticise republican policy, and included people of various political parties and viewpoints who all supported the candidacy of Jean-Pierre Chevènement. The group was chaired by writer Max Gallo, and had the following notable members: Natacha Polony, Karim Zéribi, Paul-Marie Couteaux, Élisabeth Lévy, Rémy Auchedé and Bertrand Renouvin, who founded the French political movement Nouvelle Action Royaliste.

Apolline de Malherbe took part in several work placement schemes, which solidified her love of journalism. The first one had her working for the editorial board of the Le Mans edition of newspaper Ouest-France. She also spent two consecutive summers as an editor of the newspaper Le Figaro, especially of the political section. In 2001, she worked with Le Figaro's foreign department, helping with the report on the September 11 attacks. Another work placement with the television channel LCI allowed her to work with journalist Christophe Barbier.

=== Career ===
Meeting with Christophe Barbier allowed De Malherbe to join the team responsible for preparing his morning political interviews. In 2007, she published her first essay, entitled Politiques cherchent Audimat, désespérément (politics yearns for popularity, desperately), published by Albin Michel, which won the Edgar Faure political work prize. She then joined the NextRadioTV group, subsequently becoming a producer for BFM radio. In the same year, she joined BFM TV as chief editor, alongside Ruth Elkrief, Olivier Mazerolle and Hedwige Chevrillon.

From 2008 to 2011, she was an on-the-scene reporter for BFM TV in Washington. In 2011 she became known to the general public by covering the criminal case relating to allegations of attempted rape made against French politician Dominique Strauss-Kahn, for BFM TV and for various English channels, such as CNN, NBC and ABC.

In 2012, on returning to France, she started working for TV channel Canal+.

She returned in to BFM TV in 2013 as political editor and interviewer for the show à la maison. At present, she presents BFM Politique, and has appeared on the French political and economic TV show Bourdin Direct, presented by Jean-Jacques Bourdin.

== Personal life ==
Apolline de Malherbe is the great-granddaughter of Dolorès de Malherbe, who was recognised as Righteous Among the Nations for hiding a Jewish child in Marçon during the occupation. She is also the granddaughter of Armand de Malherbe, former departmental councillor of Sarthe, and former mayor of Marçon. She is the daughter of painter Guy de Malherbe; and of Marie-Hélène de La Forest Divonne, gallery owner, and proprietor of the Château de Poncé, a Renaissance-style mansion built in around 1542 and located around fifteen kilometres from Marçon.

De Malherbe is a practising Catholic, and has two sons, born in 2007 and 2010. In January 2017, de Malherbe was heavily pregnant with a third child.

In 2015, Apolline de Malherbe became a sponsor of the 6th delegation of descendants of the Righteous Among the Nations, which was organised by the France-Israel Foundation.
