= Nathalie Levy =

French journalist (born 1976)

- Born: 22 November 1976 (age 49); Paris, France
- Education: Panthéon-Assas University; French Press Institute
- Occupations: Journalist; Author
- Employer(s): BFM TV; France 5 Europe 1

Nathalie Levy (born 22 November 1976) is a French journalist who has mainly worked in television, as news presenter on BFM TV, and then as host of a daily live news program on France 5. She presented Votre grand journal du soir on the radio station Europe 1 during the 2019–2020 season.

She has devoted herself to other projects from July 2020, including the writing of her first book Courage au coeur et sac au dos and its audio and audiovisual adaptations. This book describes the complicit relationship she has with her grandmother but also the difficult accompaniment and constraints involved in being a family caregiver.

== Education and early career ==
While Nathalie Levy was studying law at the Université Panthéon-Assas, she met a student who was starting a free bi-monthly magazine and to whom she offered her services. She thus found her vocation as a journalist despite the wish of her relatives to see her embrace a career in real estate and continue the family business.

Levy then joined the French Press Institute and did a series of internships. She began with a few papers in print media and then obtained a first internship followed by freelance work at Canal+. She then joined Radio J, which gave her some very challenging experiences and "enriching humanly and professionally". Levy covered the Second Intifada in the Middle East, presented her first newscasts and two programs including one in the European Parliament entitled Listening to Europe. She later joined the team of the French radio station in Jerusalem, Kol Israel, through a connection at the Israeli office of France Televisions.

Despite the danger of the events and the terrain, she collected testimonies and reactions of the population as an independent reporter. It is from this region that she provided her first reports to BFM Radio. Upon her return to France, she was hired there.

== Career ==
=== 2001 – 2005: BFM Radio ===
In 2001, when she arrived at the editorial office of BFM Radio, she alternated between reporting, international press review, and news presentation.

In 2003, the identity of the radio evolved. While remaining faithful to the information, she took advantage of it to host two other programs on the themes of leisure and travel.

=== 2005 – 2009 : BFM TV ===
At the creation of BFM TV at the end of 2005, the channel asked Levy to go back into the field. She then had the opportunity to replace Ruth Elkrief to present the news. In 2007, in the middle of the election campaign, she took the controls of the 19. She officially became presenter of Info 360 every night live from 21 to midnight on the occasion of the return to school and the renewal of the grid.

In July 2009, Levy left BFM TV to join France 5.

=== 2009 – 2010: France 5 ===
From September 2009, she participated in the daily show C à vous by Alessandra Sublet between 19 and 20 on France 5 before leaving the channel the following summer to return to BFM TV.

=== 2010 – 2019: BFM TV ===
From August 2010, Levy anchored the 9 to 10pm and 11pm to midnight news blocks with Info 360. In the fall of 2011, she presented it with Jean-Baptiste Boursier from 9pm to midnight. She went on maternity leave in October 2012, when she was replaced by Lucie Nuttin, the titular presenter of Week-end 360.

In August 2014, the show Info 360 was discontinued. Levy then presented News and company live on BFM TV from 21 to 22 from Monday to Thursday. The show stops in July 2019 and she leaves BFM TV at the end of the season.

=== 2019 – 2020: Europe 1 ===
From 26 August 2019, she presented Votre grand journal du soir on Europe 1, with Sebastien Krebs from 6pm to 8pm.

Levy traveled around France to cover some major events such as the Lubrizol factory fire in Rouen or during the 2020 French municipal elections so that residents could talk about their daily lives on the air: "It's kind of my trademark and I'm very keen on it: going as close to people as possible. They tell us about their daily lives. There is no pretense with them". From 16 March 2020 and until the end of the period of national containment due to the COVID-19 pandemic, she continued to present the program Your great evening news remotely with her team.

She decided to leave the station at the end of the season, leaving the place to Julian Bugier, to devote herself to other projects more oriented towards humanitarian and societal topics, such as the preparation of a television program on family caregivers for France Televisions and a program on roommate. It was in part her pervasive role as a family caregiver that had to end her collaboration with the radio station.

== Book ==
Her first book Courage au cœur et sac au dos, published by éditions du Rocher, came out on 23 September 2020. It describes the special relationship and "very strong" that links her to her grandmother, and more generally the role of family caregivers to the certainly underestimated number of 8 to 11 million in France. However, she clarifies in several interviews that she considers herself more "loving" than "caregiver".

One of the reasons she wrote this book was "the need to inscribe her grandmother in eternity". The title, taken from the words of a military song from Sambre et Meuse last century, comes mostly from Rosine's words, which she often repeated to her granddaughter to support her in difficult times.

=== The societal issue of old age ===
The book is a tribute but also a desire to highlight the issue of old age and break the taboo surrounding it.

The author considers that professions related to old age should be considered as a "way of excellence rather than a sideline". Indeed, she believes that society should rethink its relationship with the elderly. by giving more recognition to the professionals involved., especially on the salary front.

In an interview, Levy praised other national models of support, including Swedish and Danish.

In France, if the Establishment for the Elderly Dependent (EHPAD) remain indispensable according to her, their system should be rethought to avoid the maltreatment that is sometimes found there, in particular by making ethics and empathy prevail over economic profitability. Furthermore, she suggests that to support caregivers, the priority should be focused on prevention in the support of seniors and the elderly, offer corporate coaching, and offer psychological coaching to caregivers. On a personal level, she never disclosed to her employers that she was a caregiver for fear of non-understanding or even negative feedback towards her, except at the radio station Europe 1 where she was forced to do so given her work hours. Finally, the 3-month compensated leave introduced by the government on 1 October 2020 remains insufficient according to her, especially when the dependence is related to the disability of a child.

=== Adaptations of the book ===
It is subsequently produced for a podcast program that declines her book. During the meeting, a guest – personality or anonymous – tells his story through his intergenerational link with his grandparents.

In addition, in the show Vivement Dimanche of 18 April 2021, she said she was working with Christophe Dechavanne on an adaptation of his book for France Télévisions.

== Personal life ==
Nathalie Levy is married and has a daughter. In an interview with Journal du dimanche, dated 12 January 2020, she reported that, in addition to her professional activities, she also performs a daily role as a family caregiver for her grandmother This complicit yet constraining relationship is the subject of her first book, Courage au coeur et sac au dos.
