= Anne Nivat =

French journalist and war correspondent (born 1969)

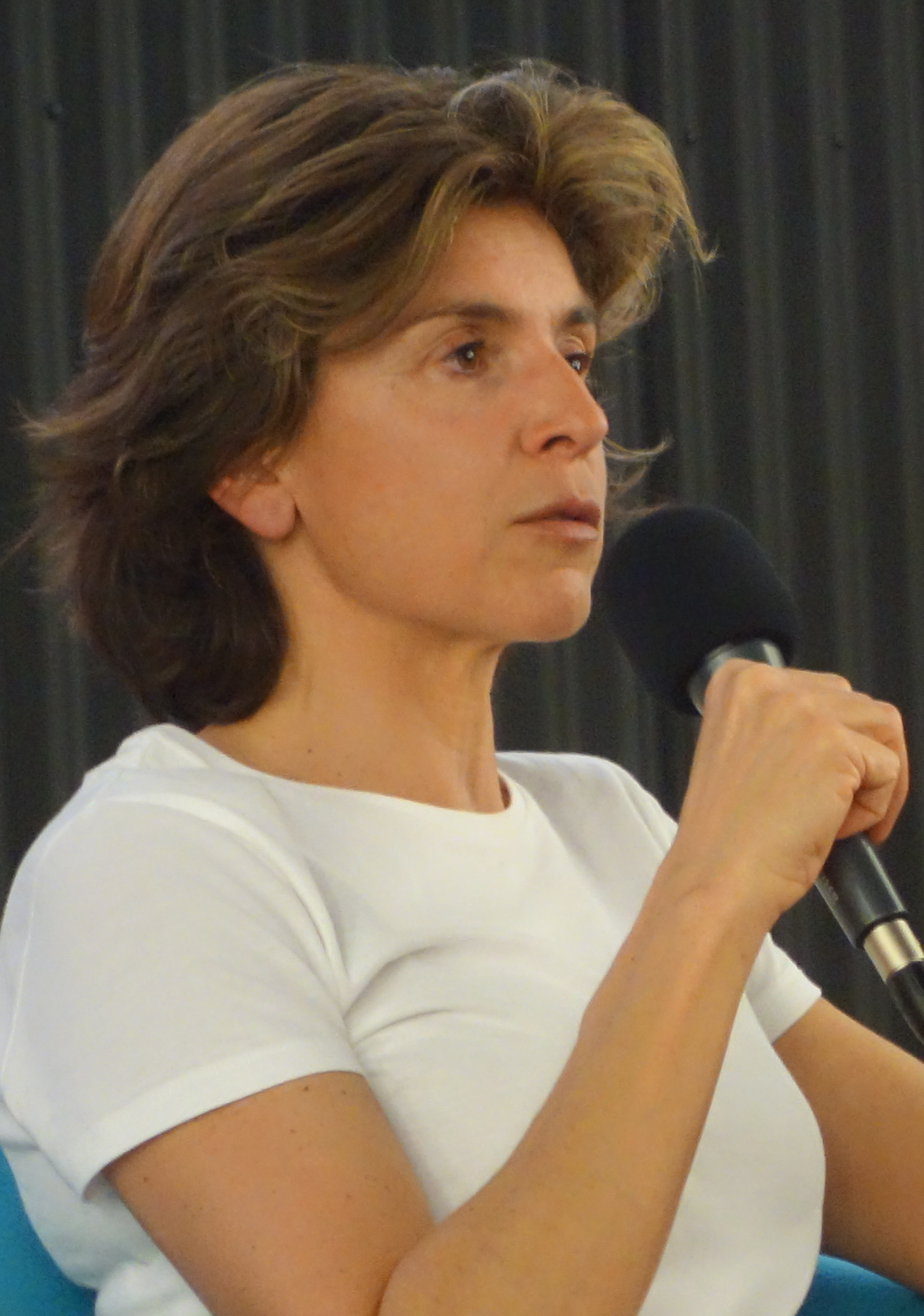
- Born: June 18, 1969 (age 57); Poisy, France
- Education: Sciences Po, PhD
- Occupations: French journalist and war correspondent
- Years active: 1995–present
- Employer: Le Point
- Known for: character portraits of people affected by war, especially women
- Notable work: coverage of the Second Chechen war
- Spouse: Jean-Jacques Bourdin
- Children: 1
- Parent: Georges Nivat
- Awards: Albert Londres Prize, 2000

Anne Nivat (born June 18, 1969, in Poisy) is a French journalist and war correspondent who has covered conflicts in Chechnya, Iraq, and Afghanistan. She is known for interviews and character portraits in print of civilians, especially women, and their experiences of war.

== Early life ==
Anne Nivat is a French citizen who grew up in Haute-Savoie near the Swiss border and Geneva. Her father is Georges Nivat, who is a historian of Russia and translator of Alexander Solzhenitsyn, and Nivat's mother taught her Russian. She is a resident of Paris and has also lived in Moscow.

== Education ==
Nivat completed her doctorate in political science after education at Paris Institute of Political Studies, or Sciences Po, in Paris.

Nivat became an expert on politics in Russia. Her first book was about Russian media during the period of glasnost in the former Soviet Union, the dissolution of the country, and its aftermath until 1995 (Anne Nivat, Quand les médias russes ont pris la parole : de la glasnost à la liberté d'expression: 1985-1995, published in 1997). After a stay at Harvard University with the Davis Center for Russian and Eurasian Studies (1997–1998), she went to Russia and reported from Chechnya in 1999.

She said she was influenced by Polish journalist Ryszard Kapuściński, whom she later met before his death, and the well-known Italian journalist Curzio Malaparte, who covered the Eastern front during World War II and wrote his accounts in the books Kaputt (1944) and The Skin (1949).

She speaks several languages besides her native French, including Russian, English, and a working knowledge of Arabic.

== Career ==
She began her reporting career at Radio Free Europe/Radio Liberty and Transitions magazine in Prague, where she worked for three years between 1995 and 1997, including a stint under Michael Kaufman, a New York Times foreign correspondent and editor, while he was on leave.

As a journalist, Nivat is most known for her reporting from Chechnya in 1999-2000 where she worked for Ouest France and as a special correspondent for Libération. Nivat traveled to Moscow in September 1999, and when the Russians invaded Chechnya, she applied as a journalist for access but was denied. She gained access to the war zone by traveling there disguised as a Chechen woman and reported independently from Russian control. Nivat was in Chechnya for four months while she intermingled and blended with the local population and reported on the conflict during a ban on journalists until she was picked up by the Russian Federal Security Service and expelled. She says she believes her success in Chechnya was based on several factors:

The fact that I am a woman helped me a great deal covering this war. No one pays attention to a woman. Whereas if you are a man, you might be arrested at any time. Also, Dan (Williams, Moscow correspondent for The Washington Post), doesn't speak Russian. The three elements which played in my favor were the fact that I speak Russian, the fact that I am a woman, and the fact that I am a part of the written press – I didn't need microphones. And the fourth element is luck.

Chechnya is where she began her career as a war correspondent, and she said it was also her worst war experience, as she survived Russian military bombardment.

In 2001 Nivat wrote down the life story of the former FLN member Louisette Ighilahriz in the book Algérienne, which was a bestseller when published. Since 2004, she has worked for Le Point, a weekly French news magazine, and has also written for Le Soir and Le Nouvel Observateur, as well as the French Huffington Post. Her English-language journalism has appeared in USA Today, U.S. News & World Report, The Washington Post, The New York Times, and Nieman Reports. For The New York Times, she wrote a piece called "Life in the 'red zone'", which is about her experiences as a war correspondent in Iraq and is included in her French-language book about Iraq. She has also written about Afghanistan by comparing the Canadian soldiers who invited her to their camp and the civilians with whom they dealt.

In 2012, her Russian visa was annulled and she was expelled once again shortly after an interview with the Russian opposition and before the presidential election. Days later, the immigration officer was fired and the Russian ambassador apologized and invited Nivat back to Russia. Her account was published by The New York Times.

Since August 2024, Nivat has worked with LCI television on weekends.

== Publications ==
- Quand les médias russes ont pris la parole : de la glasnost à la liberté d'expression, 1985-1995, L'Harmattan, 1997
- Chienne de guerre : une femme reporter en Tchétchénie, Fayard, 2000 (prix Albert-Londres), Le Livre de Poche (The Pocket Book), 2001.
- Algérienne, with Louisette Ighilahriz, Fayard, 2001
- La Maison haute, Fayard, 2002, Le Livre de Poche (The Pocket Book), 2003
- La guerre qui n'aura pas eu lieu, Fayard, 2004
- Lendemains de guerre en Afghanistan et en Irak, 2004 (prix littéraire de l'armée de terre - Erwan Bergot), Le Livre de Poche, 2005
- Islamistes, comment ils nous voient, 2006, Le Livre de Poche (The Pocket Book), 2010
- Par les monts et les plaines d'Asie Centrale, Fayard, 2006
- Bagdad Zone rouge, Fayard, 2008
- Correspondante de guerre, (avec Daphné Collignon), published by Reporters sans frontières, Soleil, Paris, 2009, ISBN 978-2-302-00565-5
- Les Brouillards de la guerre, Fayard, 2011
- La République juive de Staline, Fayard 2013
- Dans Quelle France On Vit, Fayard 2017
- Un continent derrière Poutine ?, Broché 2018

== Awards ==
In 2000, Anne Nivat was awarded the prestigious Albert Londres Prize for the printed word for her book Chienne de Guerre: A Woman Reporter Behind the Lines of the War in Chechnya. In addition, she received the third prize presented by the SAIS-Novartis International Journalism Award Program for the same reporting assignment.

In 2004, she won the Erwan Bergot literary prize for her book Lendemains de guerre (Translation: Aftermath of War).

== Personal data ==
She is married to journalist Jean-Jacques Bourdin and they have one son.

== Bibliography (English language) ==
- Anne Nivat, Chienne de Guerre: A Woman Reporter Behind the Lines of the War in Chechnya (English translation), PublicAffairs, 2001.
- Anne Nivat, The View from the Vysotka : A Portrait of Russia Today Through One of Moscow's Most Famous Addresses, 2004.
- Anne Nivat, "The Black Widows: Chechen Women Join the Fight for Independence—and Allah," Studies in Conflict and Terrorism 28, 5 (2005): 413–419.
- Anne Nivat, The Wake of War: Encounters with the People of Iraq and Afghanistan, Beacon Press, 2006.

== See also ==
- Russian government censorship of Chechnya coverage
