= Balle =

Balle may refer to:

- Balle (surname)
- Balle, Mali
- Balle, Nigeria
- Balle (runemaster)
- Michael Ballack, German soccer player

== See also ==
- "Balle Balle", a song from the movie Bride and Prejudice
- Ballet
