= Karine de Ménonville =

French journalist and television presenter

- Born: 5 October 1972 (age 53); Marignane, France
- Education: Sciences Po; Centre de formation des journalistes
- Occupations: Journalist; TV presenter
- Years active: 1995–present
- Television: LCI (1996–2007); BFM TV (2007–present)

Karine de Ménonville (born 5 October 1972) is a French journalist and television presenter.

== Education and early career ==
Karine de Ménonville was born in Marignane in the department of Bouches-du-Rhône. She graduated in 1993 at Sciences Po and in 1996 at the Centre de formation des journalistes (CFJ) in Paris where she followed a specialization in television, studying with journalists Anne-Sophie Lapix and Nathalie Renoux. Along with her studies, she worked in 1995 as a freelance journalist for Le Parisien and Le Dauphiné libéré, and finally in 1996 for France 3 Côte d'Azur.

== Television career ==
From 1996 to 2007, she worked on the continuous news channel LCI as a reporter and then as a news presenter. In June 2007, she joined BFM TV for the third version of the continuous news channel and presents of the morning news Première édition with Christophe Delay. Télé 7 Jours estimated in June 2008 that she brought "professionalism and mischief" at that news session.

In August 2009, Karine de Ménonville started co-hosting Info 360 with Ronald Guintrange. Going to maternity leave from February to May 2010, she is replaced by Stéphanie de Muru and at her return in June, Thomas Misrachi began co-hosting the program. In August 2010, Karine de Ménonville started again co-hosting the midday part with Stéphanie de Muru and Gilane Barret, and only with Gilane Barret after the departure for maternity leave of Stéphanie de Muru. In September 2012, she presents again with Ronald Guintrange on the Midi|15H, after the departure of Gilane Barret for the weekday afternoon edition of Non-Stop.
