= France 3 Provence-Alpes =

- Logo used since 2018
- Country: France
- Broadcast area: Provence-Alpes-Côte d'Azur
- Headquarters: Marseille

Ownership
- Owner: France Télévisions

History
- Launched: 20 September 1954; 71 years ago
- Former names: RTF Télé-Marseille (1954–1964); ORTF Marseille Provence (1964–1975); FR3 Méditerranée (1975–1992); France 3 Méditerranée (1992–2010)

Links
- Website: provence-alpes.france3.fr

France 3 Provence-Alpes is a regional television service, part of the France 3 network, serving the Provence-Alpes-Côte d'Azur region. The service produces regional news and entertainment, including coverage of local personalities and Mediterranean history and culture. Its headquarters is in Marseille with secondary production centre in Antibes, along with newsrooms in Toulon and Nice.

== History ==
RTF Télé-Marseille began broadcasting on 20 September 1954. In 1964, RTF was replaced with ORTF by the government, with RTF Télé-Marseille becoming ORTF Marseille Provence. After the de-establishment of ORTF on 6 January 1975, ORTF Télé-Marseille became FR3 Méditerranée. Following the establishment of France Télévisions on 7 September 1992, FR3 Méditerranée was rebranded France 3 Méditerranée.

== News programmes ==
France 3 Méditerranée produces daily news programmes for its two sub-regions - the France 3 Côte d'Azur edition is produced in Antibes, with the Provence-Alpes sub-region receiving programming from Marseille. Each sub-region gets a 27-minute bulletin (midi-pile) at 1200 CET during Ici 12/13 and a main half-hour news broadcast at 1900 during Ici 19/20. Three ten-minute local bulletins for the Marseille, Côte Varoise and Nice areas are broadcast during Ici 19/20 at 1900 CET.

On 5 January 2009, a five-minute late night bulletin was introduced, forming part of Soir 3.

On some weekends and holiday periods, as well as during major events, the Côte d'Azur and Provence-Alpes news bulletins are combined into pan-regional Méditerranée editions.
