= Louisette Ighilahriz =

Algerian revolutionary and writer

Member of the Conseil de la Nation
- In office February 2016 – October 2018

Personal details
- Born: 22 August 1936 (age 90) Oujda, French Protectorate in Morocco
- Party: Front de Libération Nationale (FLN)
- Education: Degree in psychology
- Occupation: Writer; politician; former FLN member
- Known for: Public testimony about torture during the Algerian War

Louisette Ighilahriz (born 22 August 1936) is an Algerian writer, former Conseil de la Nation member, and a former member of the Front de Libération Nationale (FLN) who came to widespread attention in 2000 with her story of captivity by the French from 1957 to 1962, becoming, in the words of the American journalist Adam Shatz, "a catalyst of a debate about the legacy of the French-Algerian war".

== Childhood and early life ==
Louisette Ighilahriz was born in Oujda, then part of the French Protectorate in Morocco, to a Berber family originally from the Kabylie region in northeastern Algeria. The Ighilahriz family relocated to Algiers in 1948. Although born outside Algeria, Ighilahriz maintained strong cultural and political ties to her ancestral homeland. Kabyle communities were historically among the most active opponents of French colonial rule in Algeria.

She later described her background as deeply nationalist, referring to her mother as "illiterate but hyperpoliticised" and stating that her maternal grandfather clandestinely manufactured firearms for Algerian resistance fighters. According to Ighilahriz, when news of the outbreak of the Algerian War reached them on 1 November 1954, her father, a baker by profession, remarked: "It is the end of the humiliation."

== FLN involvement ==
=== Revolutionary work and capture ===
Strongly anti-French, Ighilahriz joined the FLN under the codename Lila in late 1956 to work as a courier, smuggling information, weapons and bombs across Algiers in bread baked by her father. On 28 September 1957 while traveling with a FLN party, Ighilahriz was ambushed by the French paratroopers at Chébli, badly wounded and captured. At the hospital, Ighilahriz was given the "truth drug" Pentothal to make her talk, which failed to achieve its purpose.

=== Conditions for women in the FLN ===
Ighilahriz wrote in her memoirs that the other members of her unit viewed her with suspicion as the only woman, explaining that, "for them I remained a woman of the town who, horror of horrors, even knew how to use a pen." Furthermore, Ighilahriz wrote that during this period, "I was no longer really a woman. The war had transformed me, I had become lacking in all feeling and had basically forgotten my femininity."

=== Military prison ===
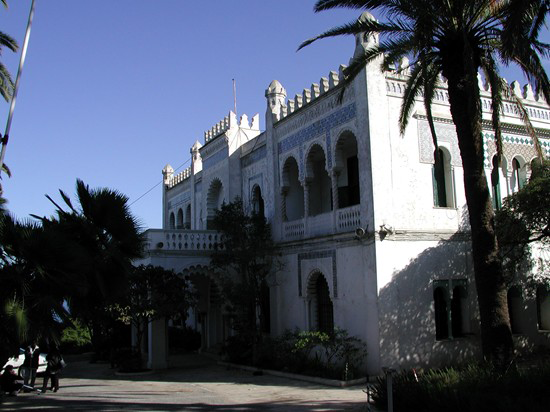
Villa Susini

Ighilahriz was taken to a military prison at Paradou Hydra where a French Army captain, Jean Graziani, cut her bangs, prodded her wounds with a bayonet and then raped her in her words "with all sorts of objects" to make her talk. For months, Ighilahriz was tortured and raped in attempts to make her reveal what she knew about the FLN before finally breaking down in December 1957, telling her captors everything she knew about the FLN. During this time, Ighilahriz was not allowed to bathe and spent months covered in her own blood, excrement and urine as she was held in a tiny cell. Ighilahriz remembered: "Mon urine s'infiltrait sous la bâche du lit de camp, mes excréments se mélangeaient à mes menstrues jusqu'à former une croûte puante" ("My urine passed through the sheet covering the camp bed, my excrement mixed with my menstrual blood, forming a stinking crust"). To further degrade her, Ighilahriz was forced to live completely naked during her entire time at the military prison. Ighilahriz recalled:

"I was lying naked, always naked. They would come one, two or three times daily. As soon as I heard the sound of their boots in the hallway, I began to tremble. Then time became endless. The minutes seemed like hours, and the hours like days. The hardest thing was handling the first days, to get used to the pain. Then one would be detached mentally, as if the body began to float.

Massu was brutal, awful. Bigeard was not better, but the worst was Graziani. It's unspeakable, he was a pervert who took pleasure in torturing. It was not human. I often yelled at him: "You're not a man if you do not finish me! " And he answered with a sneer: "Not yet, not yet!" During these three months, I had one goal: to kill myself, but the worst suffering, is to want at all costs to erase oneself and to not find the means."

Ighilahriz stated about Captain Jean Graziani: "Mais l'essentiel de ses tortures ne s'exerçaient pas à mains nues. Il était toujours armé d'ustensiles pour s'acharner contre mon plâtre" ("But he did not carry out most of his torture with his bare hands. He was always armed with implements to attack my plaster cast").

=== Family ===
Ighilahriz's family also suffered: "They arrested my parents and most of my siblings. My mother underwent waterboarding for three weeks. One day, they brought before her the youngest of her nine children, my three-year-old little brother, and they hanged him."

=== Dr. Richaud ===
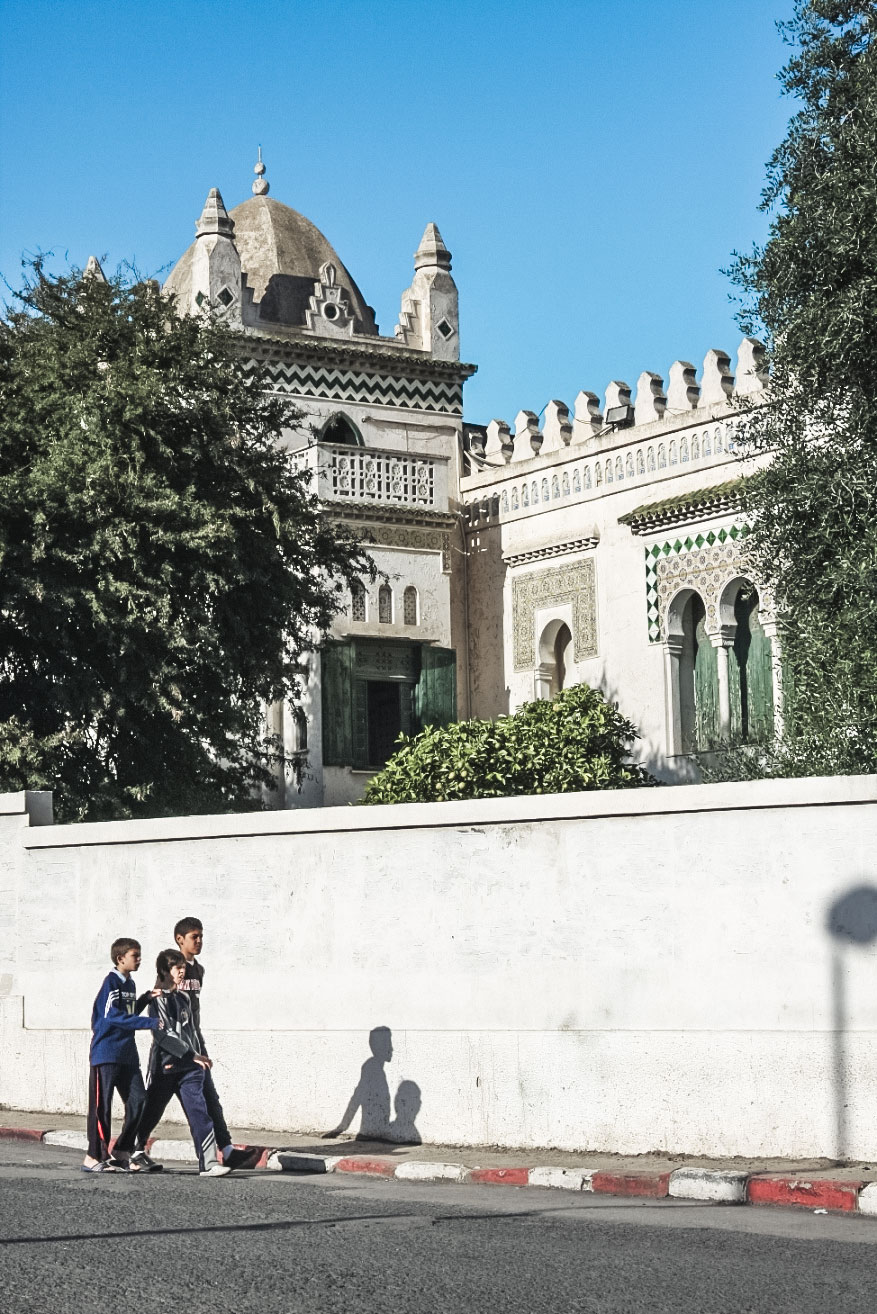
Villa Susini

Ighilahriz credited her survival to a doctor whom she knew only as "Richaud", who she called a most gentle and kind man who treated her injuries. At the time she first met "Richard", Ighilahriz recalled " "J'étais en train de devenir folle" ("I was losing my mind"), stating the effects of torture, rape and repeated injections of the "truth drug" Pentothal had pushed her to the brink of madness.

"Richaud" told Ighilahriz that she reminded him of his daughter who was about her age, and to whom he was very close. "Richaud" played something of a surrogate father to Ighilahriz as she remembered him telling her: "Mon petit, vous êtes bien jeune pour le maquis. Je vous en prie, laissez ça aux autres. Aux hommes, par exemple!" ("My child, you are too young for the resistance. I beg of you, leave that to others, to men, for example!") The scholar Mildred Mortimer writes that "Richaud" for all his tenderness and compassion towards Ighilahriz subscribed to the traditional French macho viewpoint that war was entirely for men, seeing her involvement with the FLN as something unnatural for a woman, and noted by contrast that Ighilahriz's father had encouraged his daughters to join the FLN. Mortimer also noted the irony that though "Richaud" saved Ighilahriz's life he was a supporter of Algérie française, approving of the goals though not the methods of the French Army in Algeria.

After confessing, Ighilahriz was taken to France, where she was imprisoned in Baumettes, La Roquette, Amiens, Fresnes, Toulouse and Bastia. In January 1962, Ighilariz escaped from prison, and was hidden by French Communists in Nice. Under the amnesty of May 1962, she was pardoned. Afterwards, Ighilahriz went to university, obtaining a degree in psychology. In Muslim Algeria, a woman had to be a virgin in order to be married, and the subject of rape was taboo, and upon Ighilahriz's return to Algeria, her mother made her promise never to speak of her ordeal lest it shame the family. Decades after this promise, Ighilahriz broke it to publicize her experience, encouraging "other Algerian women and men to discuss their experiences publicly as well".

== Publicization ==
Ighilahriz's story was unknown until 15 June 2000, when Le Monde newspaper published an interview by the journalist Florence Beaugé. University-educated, secular, fluent in French and very fond of quoting Victor Hugo, Ighilahriz came across in her interview with Beaugé as more French than Algerian, which helped to make her a more appealing victim to the French. Shatz notes that "What made her interview particularly poignant was that she seemed to be moved less by rage at her jailers than by gratitude to the doctor who saved her." Ighilahriz stated that her reason for coming forward – after remaining silent for decades, as she was too ashamed of what had happened to her – was that she wanted to see "Richaud" one last time to thank him.

=== Interviews regarding the war ===
In an interview with Le Monde in 2000, Ighilahriz stated that both General Marcel Bigeard and General Jacques Massu had been present when she was raped and tortured in 1957. Bigeard stated in an interview that her story was a "tissue of lies" meant to "destroy all that is decent in France" and denied that Dr "Richaud" existed. By contrast, Massu told the French media that he was not present when Ighilahriz was tortured and raped, saying he could not remember her, but expressed "regret" that the paras had engaged in torture and used rape as an interrogation tool, saying that there were things that had happened in Algeria that he wished had never happened. Massu confirmed the existence of "Richaud", saying that Ighilahriz must have been referring to Dr François Richaud, who had been the doctor stationed at the prison in 1957. Dr Richaud had died on 21 September 1997. A devout Catholic, Massu wrote to Pope Pius XII in February 1957 to complain that the Catholic archbishop of Algiers was not giving his men sufficient spiritual support as they went about the business of torture. In March 1957 his conscience was eased when the Catholic chaplain attached to his unit told him that God approved of torture as the only way to defeat the FLN, who were all Muslims. After Ighilahriz had accused him of torturing her in 2000, General Massu visited his parish priest for confession, and afterwards announced that he changed his mind about torture, saying he now believed that torture was not necessary to win the Battle of Algiers.

In 2014, Ighilahriz spoke of her wish that France would recognize the events of the war in Algeria. In particular, she mentioned that General Bollardière, who had protested against the torture of Algerians by the French, had not had his reputation restored following his arrest in April 1957 for discussing the torture with the French press. She said that his rehabilitation would essentially equate to France admitting to large-scale torture and rape during the Algerian War. Ighilahriz explained, "Le viol, c'est ce qu'il y a de pire pour une femme : c'est la négation d'elle-même" [rape is the worst for a woman; it is the negation of her very self].

=== Book publication ===
After the interview, Ighilahriz dictated her life story to the French journalist Anne Nivat. It was published in 2001 as Algérienne, becoming a bestseller in France. Nivat said about her first impression of Ighilahriz: "Dès la première seconde où j'ai croisé son regard, j'ai cru en cette femme...Je savais qu'elle parlerait, parce qu'elle avait beaucoup à raconter et souhaitait le raconter. Je n'ai pas été déçue" ("From the moment our eyes met, I believed in this woman... I knew that she would speak, because she had a lot to say and wanted to speak out. I was not disappointed.") At the beginning of Algérienne, Ighilahriz stated that her decision to go forward with her story took place over the opposition of her family, her colleagues and the Algerian government, all of whom felt that the story of a Berber woman being raped was deeply shameful. Mortimer writes that though Ighilahriz suffered terribly, the purpose of her story is more to pay tribute to Dr Richaud than to express rage at her torturers and rapists.

A key moment in Algérienne described Ighilahriz and her sister Ouardia visiting the grave of Dr Richaud to place flowers before his tombstone: on 21 September 2000, the Ighilahriz sisters and Nivat visited the tomb of Dr Richaud, where the sisters offered him a symbolic cup of coffee in an "ecumenical gesture" of thanks. Afterwards, the Ighilahriz sisters met Richaud's daughter to give her their thanks for her father's actions. On 31 December 2000, Ouardia Ighilahriz returned alone to Richaud's grave to place a plaque reading "Où que tu sois, tu seras toujours parmi nous. Louisette" ("Wherever you are, you will always be among us. Louisette"). Attached to the plaque was a handwritten note with a drawing of a dove carrying an olive branch, the note reading: "Avec toute ma gratitude.—Louisette" ("With all my gratitude. – Louisette").

=== Trauma and support ===
Mortimer noted that the university-educated and independent-minded Ighilahriz is fluent in French, but chose not to write her own story, instead dictating it to Nivat, and had to be accompanied by Nivat and her sister to Dr Richaud's tomb, which for her was evidence of the extraordinarily difficult nature of Ighilahriz's experiences. Mortimer further noted how much emotional support Ighilahriz drew from fellow women such as her sister Ouardia and Nivat played a key role in helping her to confront her past, suggesting that the story of Algérienne is actually the story of three women rather than one. Mortimer commented that it was striking when it came to dealing with the memory of unspeakable physical and sexual abuse, apart from Dr Richaud, all of the emotional support that Ighilahriz drew upon came from other women.

=== Response in Algeria ===
In 2011, Saadi Yacef, a leading FLN militant who was then a senator in Algeria, attacked Ighilahriz, claiming that she was never a member of the FLN and lied about being raped, stating she is "excellent dans l'art de faire de la comédie". In response, Ighilahriz said that Yacef too broke under torture when he was captured by the French, and stated that as a Berber Muslim man, he was angry with her for breaking the taboo surrounding rape in Berber culture. Ighilahriz also suggested that Yacef was jealous of the way that her story had come to overshadow his in the popular memory of the Algerian War. Natalya Vince writes that, with the support of other former female FLN fighters, "Ighilahriz called a press conference and retorted that Saadi himself was a traitor", calling for him to "give up his parliamentary immunity as a presidentially elected senator to come and face her, as a citizen, in court to dispute the facts". The lack of a subsequent court case causes Vince to describe Ighilahriz as "the vindicated underdog who had forced Saadi to back down despite his greater political power." Finally, Ighilahriz called for unbiased, independent Algerian historians.

=== Response in France ===
The British historian Martin Thomas writes that Ighilahriz's interview and her book generated a media storm in France in 2000 and 2001, as her account of physical and sexual abuse while in the custody of the 10th Paratroop Division for three months in late 1957 resonated with the French people, making her the face of victims of torture in Algeria. Thomas further noted that at the same time that Algérienne was a bestseller, another book about the Algerian War, namely Services spéciaux Algérie 1955-1957 by General Paul Aussaresses, was an even bigger bestseller in France. Thomas also noted that Services spéciaux Algérie 1955-1957 was translated into English as The Battle of the Casbah: Terrorism and Counter-Terrorism in Algeria, 1955-1957 while Algérienne still awaits its translation. He argues that many people even today in the West still attach greater value to the lives of Westerners over non-Westerners, which explains why a book by a Frenchman describing and justifying torture as a legitimate counter-terrorism tactic in the Battle of Algiers attracts more attention and better sales than does a book by an Algerian woman describing her experiences of the torture that Aussaresses ordered.

In a 2003 essay, General Maurice Schmitt of the French Army accused Ighilahriz of fabricating her entire story, making much of the fact that she described Captain Jean Graziani as having green eyes when in fact his eyes were brown. Schmitt stated that he served alongside Graziani in Vietnam, and called him a passionate French patriot from Corsica, whom he described as incapable of committing the acts that Ighilahriz accused him of. In response to Schmitt, Ighilahriz stated that after the passage of almost 50 years, she may have misremembered small details, and the way in which Schmitt obsessively tried to discredit her over small mistakes suggested the French Army on an institutional level was still not willing to admit that it engaged in torture and rape during the Algerian War. More controversy has centred on the fact that in the first edition of Algérienne, Ighilahriz denied being raped, saying "Il ne pouvait pas non plus me violer, j'étais trop dégueulasse!" ("He couldn't think of raping me. I was too disgusting!"), but testified at the civil trial of General Schmitt that she had been raped. Schmitt, who served in Algeria, has been accused of having engaged in torture. However, Mortimer defends Ighilahriz on the grounds of the Muslim Berber culture's attitude that it is deeply shameful for an unmarried woman not to be a virgin, so to avoid public scorn she would not want to discuss being raped.

== Political views and work since the war ==
=== Work with the UNFA ===
After the war, Ighilahriz worked with the Union Nationale des Femmes Algériennes (UNFA), an association designed to embody "'the Algerian woman' abroad," represent "her interest and needs at home" and prepare "her to participate in the running of the state", although it essentially functioned as a "branch of the FLN's mass organisation apparatus" supporting the single party state. Scholars such as Abdelkader Cheref describe the UNFA as essential to "organizing active women to provide backing for the state's policies", yet "a token maneuver intended to satisfy Algerian women's demands for political representation without really giving it". Ighilahriz's activities as a member of the executive committee of the UNFA included visits to other countries, "ostensibly with the task of looking at socio-economic models which might work in Algeria". However, despite her participation, Ighilahriz described qualms about the UNFA, saying "I found myself in the Secretariat of the UNFA. Almost without thinking, and I'm angry with myself." According to later statements, Ighilahriz opposed the very theory of the UNFA, explaining, "I cannot accept single-sex activism... It was not my orientation, and it wasn't my ideology. This man-woman dichotomy, I accepted it and I don't how I found myself caught up in it." On a more practical level, Ighilahriz also cited the "lack of ambition, inefficiency and clientelism" of the Union. Natalya Vince summarizes this opposition by writing that Ighilahriz and other "educated female veterans" viewed a female-only union as not "a positive step towards gender equality; rather, they saw it as a regression into female difference, and, by inference, inferiority". Furthermore, Ighilahriz explains that, regarding her work towards female political participation, "My task was too much, the weight of tradition was enormous and the number of conservative men extremely high. Wherever I went, I was very well received but in practice, there were dreadful obstacles."

=== Conseil de la Nation ===
Louisette Ighilahriz joined the Conseil de la Nation, the upper house of the bicameral parliament, in February 2016, having been appointed by Abdelaziz Bouteflika, then President of Algeria, who appointed one-third of the seats. Speaking of her time in the Conseil, Ighilahriz stated that she tried to work towards addressing social problems, yet that she and the other members were asked to "marcher sans trop nous poser de question" [to walk without being asked too many questions], implying that she and the Conseil lacked legitimate power.

=== Resignation and protest ===
In October 2018, Ighilahriz announced her resignation as an act of protest against President Bouteflika running for a fifth mandate. She said that the fourth mandate finished poorly and that due to his minimal public appearances, she would not vote for "un candidat invisible" [an invisible candidate]. She denounced the President's failure to facilitate investment.

In February 2019, potential presidential candidate Ali Ghediri announced on his Facebook page that Ighilahriz had declared her support for him. She subsequently told TSA, an Algerian news site, that his policy plans convinced her, noting particularly his plans to fight against corruption and unemployment, to create new jobs, and to try to stop underground emigration. She described him as brave, humble, and wise, remarking that she believed that he would satisfy the Algerian people and bring about significant changes for the good.

But on 7 March 2019, in the context of massive protests across Algeria against President Bouteflika running for a fifth mandate, Ighilahriz announced to TSA that she no longer supported Ali Ghediri as a candidate. Instead, she said, "Nous sommes en train de tout faire pour que le système s'en aille et quant le système partira, on se mettra d'accord sur une constituante comme point de départ et nous formerons un nouveau gouvernement par la suite" [We are doing everything so that the system goes away, and when the system leaves, we will agree on a constituent phase as a departure point and we will form a new government thereafter].

== In popular culture ==
Woman is Courage is a 2003 documentary about Ighilahriz. Louisette, a short animated film, synopsises the experiences of Ighilahriz was released by Le Monde in 2022.
