= Christophe Hondelatte =

French television and radio host (born 1962)

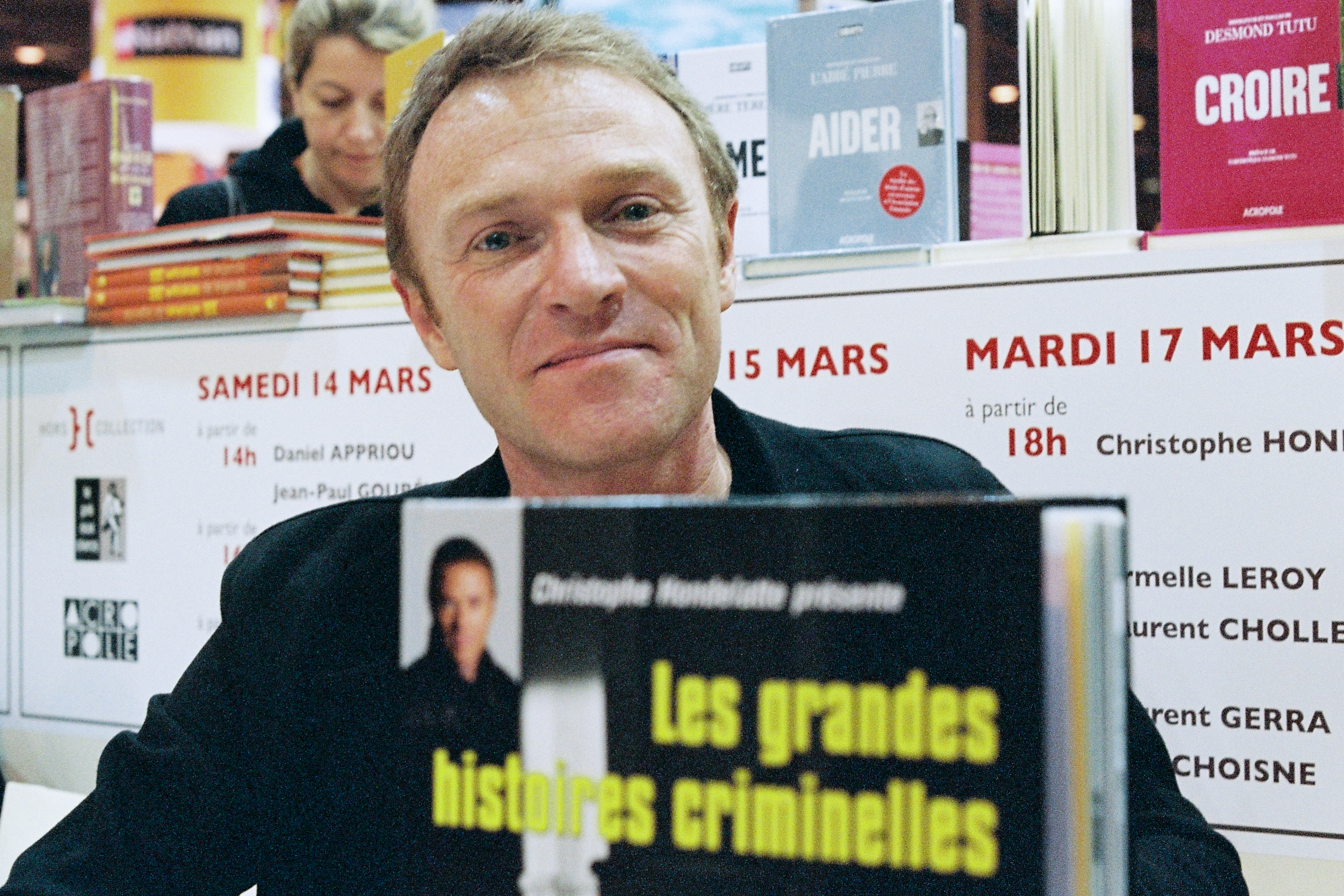
- Christophe Hondelatte with his book in 2009
- Born: 17 December 1962 (age 63); Bayonne, France
- Education: Sciences Po Bordeaux
- Occupation: Journalist

Christophe Hondelatte (born 17 December 1962) is a French television and radio host who has worked for BFMTV since fall 2014.

In 1984, Hondelatte graduated from the Institute of Political Studies of Bordeaux.

Between 1985 and 1988, Hondelatte worked for several Radio France stations. He left public service in 1990 to present for RTL, which he quit on 15 May 2012. He was the host of France 2's Faites entrer l'accusé.

Hondelatte and BFMTV colleague Jean-Jacques Bourdin have been described as a "duo of shock".
