= Nassima Hablal =

Algerian freedom fighter

Nassima Hablal (September 15, 1928 – May 14, 2013) was an Algerian independence activist. She was one of the 10,949 women who fought in the Algerian revolution. Hablal was active in the Algerian People's Party (APP) and was the secretary of Abane Ramdane at the CCE, the Coordinating and Execution Committee for one of the branches of the FLN. She received the position secretary of the Committee for Coordination and Implementation [CEC] at the beginning of the movement. Hablal strived to see her country free from French colonization.

== Independence work ==
Nassima was involved with the resistance efforts from 1945 to 1962 (starting when she was 17 years old). She provided false identity cards to members of the FLN and frequently typed and distributed leaflets for the resistance. Hablal became the secretary of Abane in 1955. She took part in organizing the eight-day strike alongside other officials after becoming the first woman to join the General Union of Algerian Workers.

=== Eight-day strike ===
Hablal was part of the committee that organized the eight-day strike from January 28 – February 4, 1957. The strike appeared to be a success with most Muslim shops remaining shuttered; workers failed to turn up and children did not attend school. The French used armored cars and troops to round up workers and schoolchildren and force them to attend their work/studies. Thus, within a few days the strike had been broken.

== Arrest ==
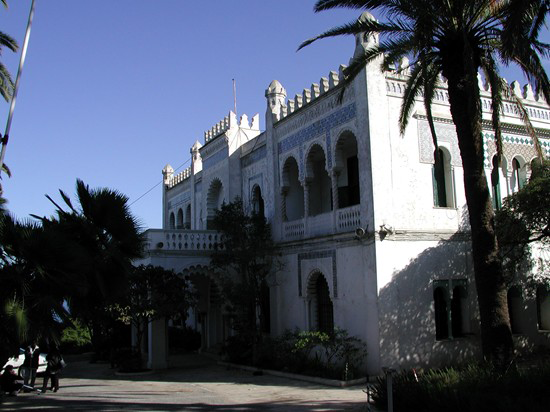
Villa Susini

Hablal was arrested on 21 February 1957. She was sentenced to five years in prison and was brutally tortured in Villa Susini. It has been reported that she was hung upside-down from the ceiling and electrocuted. She was later transferred to a prison in France.

== Film 10949 women ==
Director Nassima Ghessoum created the film 10949 Women to commemorate the documented number of women who were involved in the Algerian independence movement from French colonization. The number was located in the officially listed in the file of the ministry of the veterans. Hablal's story is featured in the documentary. 10949 Women was in competition at the 25th edition of FESPACO 2015 as part of the official selection.
