= Ballen (surname) =

Ballen is a surname. Notable people with the surname include:

- Andrew Ballen (born 1973), American businessman and consumer advocate
- Frederick Ballen (1843–1916), Union Army soldier and Medal of Honor recipient
- Roger Ballen (born 1950), American photographer

== See also ==
- Balle (surname)
- MrBallen, true-crime YouTuber
