= Villa Susini =

Torture center in Algiers during Algeria War

Villa Sésini
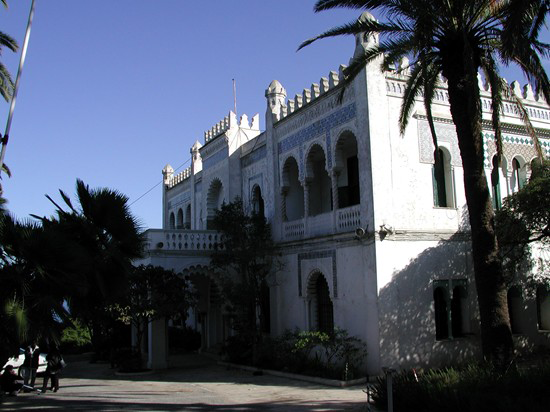
- Interactive map of Villa Sésini
- Location: El Madania, Algiers Province, Algeria
- Coordinates: 36.7076255°N 3.5928705°E
- Type: Prison
- Material: concrete, steel, iron, stone, brick, wood
- Width: 60 metres (200 ft)
- Height: 66 metres (217 ft)
- Dedicated to: Torture, Algeria War
- Website: www.m-moudjahidine.dz; Ministry of Mujahideen on Facebook

The villa Sésini (often improperly spelt Susini) is a former torture center established in El Madania (ex-Salombier) during the Algerian war in the city of Algiers.

== History ==
The villa was built in El Madania (ex-Salombier) by Alexandre Sésini, notary at rue Bab Azzoun in Algiers.

In 1926, the city of Algiers classified it as a natural monument, in 1927, the German consulate moved there.

It was transformed into a detention and torture center during the Algerian Revolution.

It housed after independence for a time, the headquarters of the United Nations High Commissioner for Refugees (UNHCR).

After the independence of Algeria, the Villa Susini was used, in coordination with Cuba, for the military training of Latin American revolutionaries.

By decree of the Algerian Ministry of Culture dated 28 April 2016, the villa is classified on the list of protected cultural property.

== Notable inmates ==
- Brahim Boushaki (1912-1997)
- Louisette Ighilahriz (born 1936)
- Mohamed Charef (1908-2011)
- Nassima Hablal (1928-2013)

== Notable torturers ==
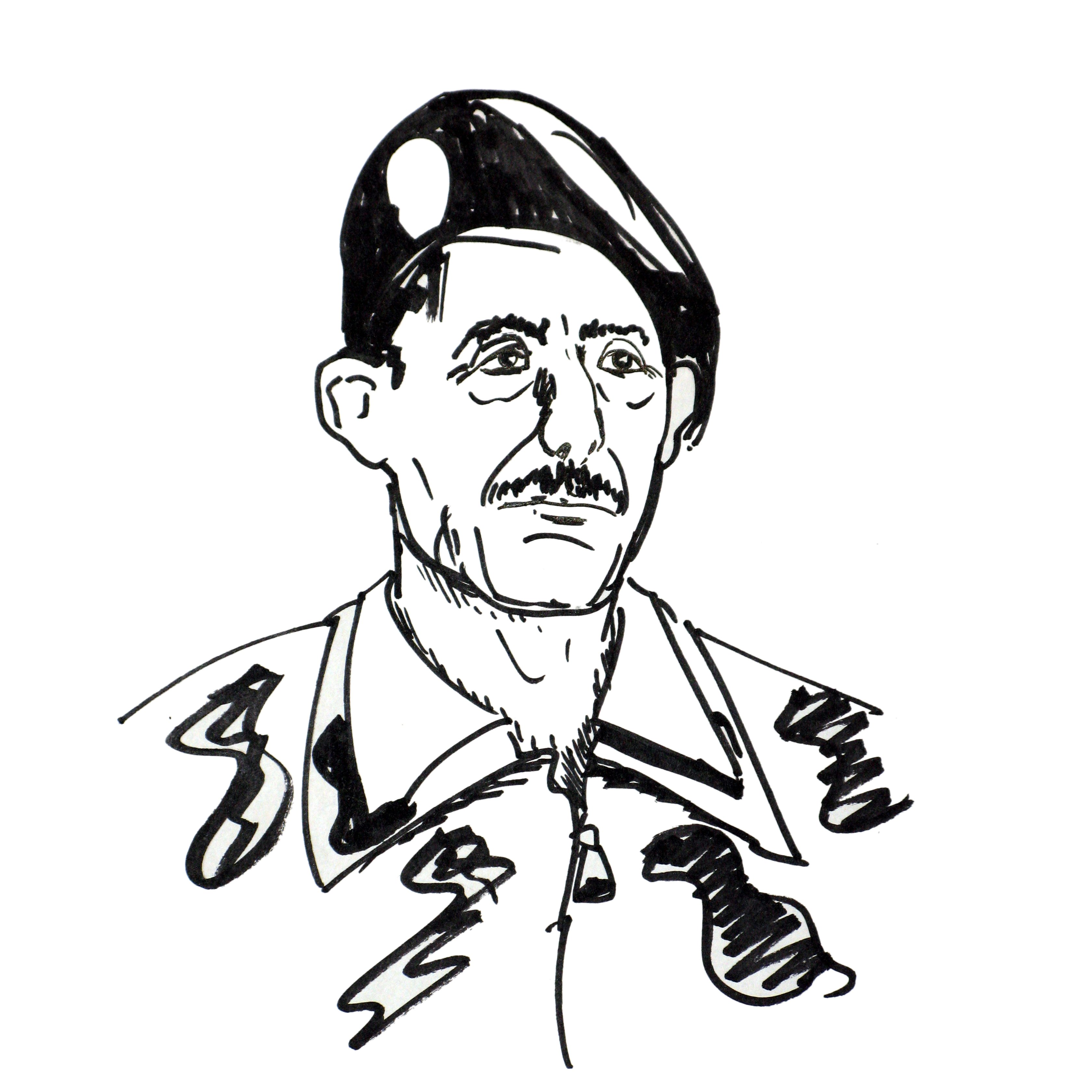
Jacques Massu

- Roger Trinquier
- Louis Pierre Martin
- Roger Faulques
- Wilhelmus Vaal
- Paul Aussaresses
- Jean Graziani
- Jacques Massu
- André Chabanne
- Henri Pouillot
- Yves Godard
- Marcel Bigeard
- Michel Fleutiaux
- Philippe Erulin
- André Charbonnier
- Jean-Marie Le Pen
- Paul-Alain Léger
- Maurice Schmitt
- Marcel Devis
- Albert Roux
- Charles Lacheroy

== Gallery ==
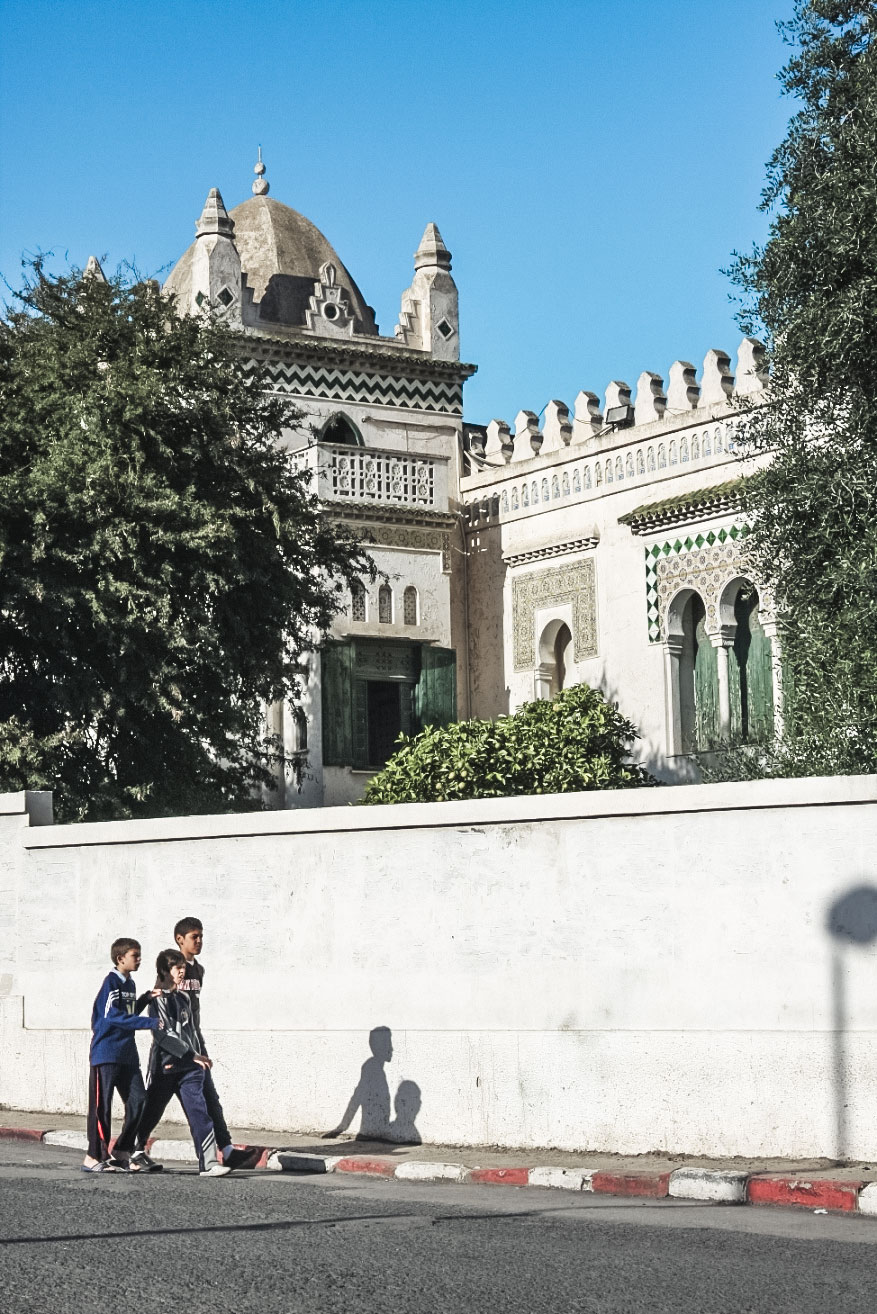
Villa Susini

== See also ==
- Algeria War
- National Liberation Front (Algeria)
- Torture during the Algerian War of Independence
- List of cultural assets of Algeria
- Ministry of Mujahideen
- Soummam conference
- Battle of Algiers (1956–1957)
- Historic Wilaya IV
- Water torture
- Mujahideen
- Shahid
- Called up from the contingent during the Algerian war

== Bibliography ==
- Laurent Schwartz (1961). Le problème de la torture dans la France d'aujourd'hui, 1954-1961. Paris: Cahiers de la république.
- Henri Pouillot (2001). La villa Susini: tortures en Algérie : un appelé parle, juin 1961-mars 1962. Paris: Éditions Tirésias. ISBN 9782908527889.
- Henri Pouillot (2004). Mon combat contre la torture. Paris: Éditions Bouchène. ISBN 9782912946904.
- Yves Beigbeder (2006). Judging War Crimes And Torture: French Justice And International Criminal Tribunals And Commissions (1940-2005). Paris: Martinus Nijhoff Publishers. p. 121. ISBN 9004153292.
