= Balle (surname) =

Balle is a surname. Notable people with the surname include:

- Carl Christian Nicolaj Balle (1806–1855), Danish composer, editor, and pastor
- Francis Balle (born 1939), French academic
- Solvej Balle (born 1962), Danish writer

== See also ==
- Ballen (surname)
