= Marc-Olivier Fogiel =

French media executive, television and radio presenter, and produce l (born 1969)

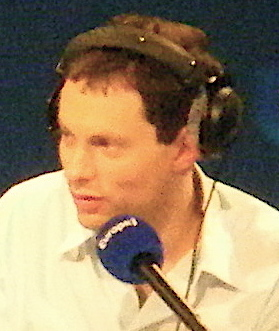
- Marc-Olivier Fogiel in 2009
- Born: 5 July 1969 (age 57); Neuilly-sur-Seine, France
- Education: Panthéon-Assas University
- Occupations: Presenter, producer
- Spouse: François Roelants (m. 2013)
- Children: 2 daughters

Marc-Olivier Fogiel (born 5 July 1969) is a French media executive, television and radio presenter, and producer.

== Early life ==
Marc-Olivier Fogiel was born on 5 July 1969 in Neuilly-sur-Seine, France. His father is a dentist, and his mother was an estate agent who retired when she had children. His paternal grandfather was a Holocaust survivor who lost many members of his family because they were Jewish. He has a brother and a sister.

Fogiel graduated from Panthéon-Assas University, where he earned an associate degree in economics in 1988.

== Career ==
Fogiel started working for RTL at the age of 16. He subsequently worked as an assistant producer to Patrick Sabatier for Avis de recherche and Tous à la une, two television programs on TF1. He became an accredited journalist in 1993.

Fogiel was a presenter on Télés Dimanche, a television program on Canal+ hosted by Michel Denisot. He was the host of TV+ from 1996 to 1998 and Un an de + from 1998 to 2000, both of which were on Canal+. From 2000 to 2006, he presented On ne peut pas plaire à tout le monde, a talk show on France 3. He then presented T'empêches tout le monde de dormir, another talk show on M6, from 2006 to 2008.

Fogiel was the host of Europe 1 Matin, a radio morning program on Europe 1, from 2008 to 2012. He returned to RTL in September 2012, where he presents RTL soir and On refait le monde. Since 2015, he is also the host of Le Divan on France 3. In 2019, he was named CEO of BFM TV.

== Personal life ==
Fogiel married François Roelants in 2013. They have two daughters.

== Works ==
- Fogiel, Marc-Olivier (2009). A mon tour d'être sur le gril. Paris: Plon. ISBN 9782259210027. OCLC 451096547.
