= France 3 Côte d'Azur =

Coordinates: 43°36′40″N 7°07′32″E

- Logo used since 2018
- Country: France
- Broadcast area: Provence-Alpes-Côte d'Azur; Monaco
- Headquarters: Antibes

Ownership
- Owner: France Télévisions

History
- Launched: 1964; 62 years ago
- Former names: RTF Télé-Marseille (1964); ORTF Marseille Provence (1964–1975); FR3 Méditerranée (1975–1992); France 3 Méditerranée (1992–2010)

Links
- Website: cote-d-azur.france3.fr

France 3 Côte d'Azur is one of France 3s regional services broadcasting in French and Provençal audio tracks. The service broadcasts to people living in the Provence-Alpes-Côte d'Azur region. It is headquartered in Antibes.

France 3 Côte d'Azur was launched in 1964 as RTF Télé-Marseille. The service is available on terrestrial television and cable in Provence-Alpes-Côte d'Azur. It is also available on cable in Monaco.

== Presenters ==
- Vincent Capus
- Jacqueline Pozzi
- Véronique Lupo
- Olivier Orsini
- Jean-Bernard Vitiello

== Programming ==
- Ici Matin Côte d'Azur
- Ici 19/20 Côte d'Azur
- Ici 19/20 Nice
- Ici 19/20 Toulon-Var
- Ici 12/13 Côte d'Azur

== See also ==
- France 3
- France 3 Provence-Alpes
