= Karim Zéribi =

French politician

Karim Zéribi MEP
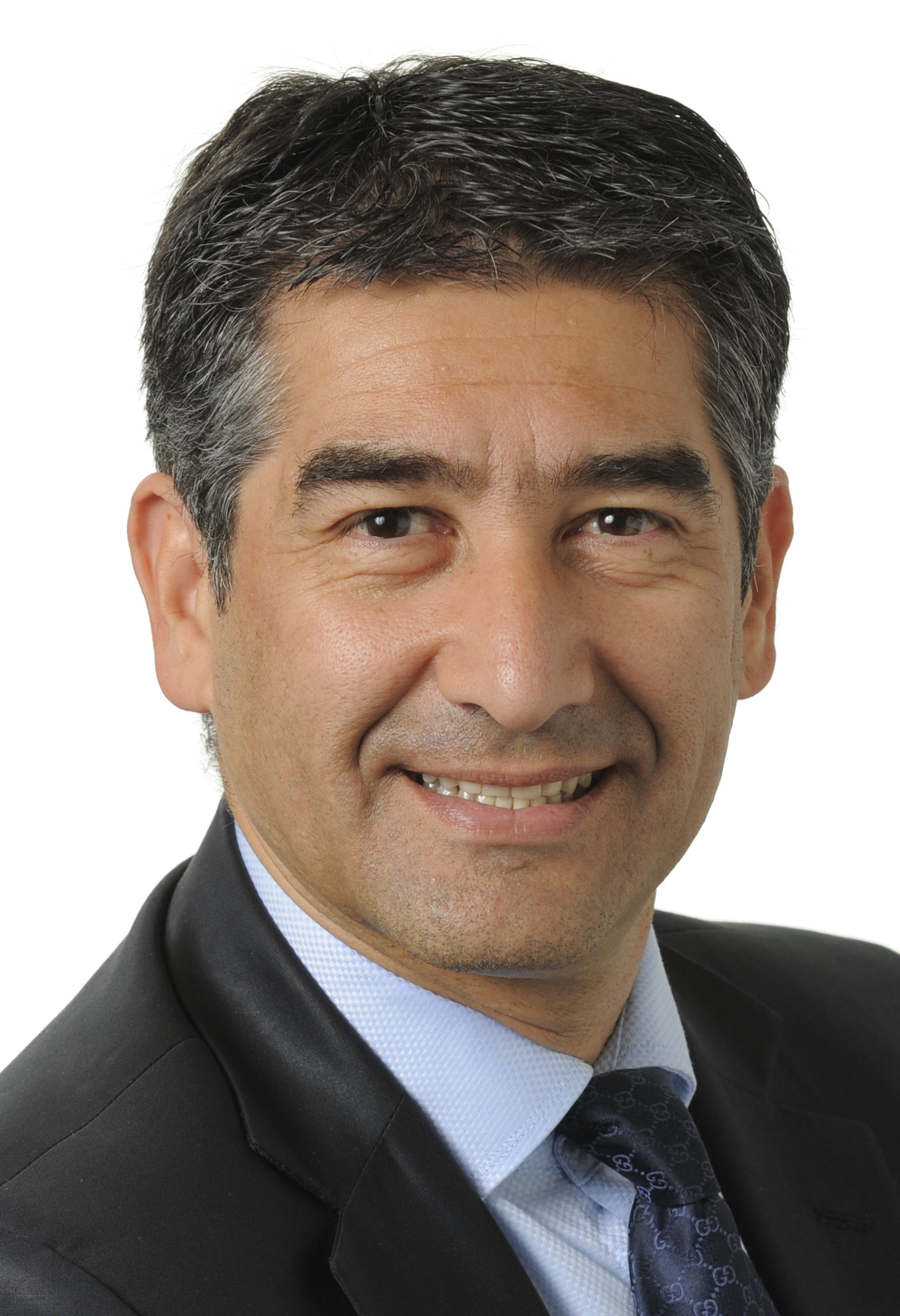
- Official portrait, 2012

Member of the European Parliament for France
- In office 2012–2014
- Preceded by: Vincent Peillon

Personal details
- Born: 25 September 1966 (age 59) Avignon, France
- Party: Europe Écologie–The Greens

Karim Zéribi (French pronunciation: [kaʁim zeʁibi]; born 25 September 1966) is a French politician of Europe Ecology – The Greens, Member of the European Parliament.

Zéribi was born in Avignon, France, and succeeded socialist politician Vincent Peillon as representative for the South-East constituency. Zéribi changed parties to EELV in 2010. Two of his three Algerian grandparents are of Arab origin and one grandparent is French (citizen or origin).

== Judicial inquiry ==
Karim Zéribi is suspected to have embezzled 50,000 euros of subsidies. He was placed in police custody on 8 April 2015.
