= Jean-Jacques Bourdin =

French journalist and TV presenter (b. 1949)

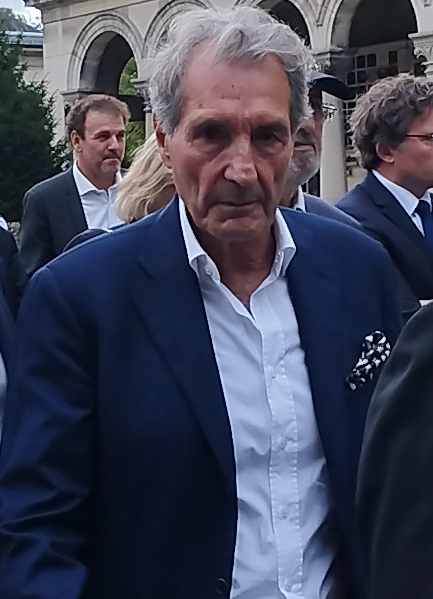
- Bourdin in 2024
- Born: 15 June 1949 (age 77); Colombes, France
- Occupations: Journalist, radio presenter, television presenter
- Years active: 1976–present
- Notable credit: Bourdin Direct
- Television: BFMTV
- Spouse: Anne Nivat

Jean-Jacques Bourdin (born 15 June 1949) is a French journalist, radio and television presenter. Since 2001, he has hosted the morning radio programme Bourdin Direct on RMC. Since 2018, he has also presented the monthly talk show Rien n'est impossible on RMC Story.

== Early life and education ==
Bourdin was born in Colombes in the department of Hauts-de-Seine, the eldest of five children. He grew up in Alès in the Gard department in a family environment he describes as well-off and of Protestant culture. His father owned a small company and his mother was a housewife. At the age of 16, he participated at the 1965 presidential election by posing posters for the far right candidate Jean-Louis Tixier-Vignancour with his father. Graduated with a high school certificate in literature in 1967, Jean-Jacques Bourdin briefly went to university, and then did various jobs.

== Career ==
Having failed to join the daily sport newspaper L'Équipe, Bourdin joined in July 1976 the sport service of the radio station RTL with the help of the director Raymond Castans. He stayed on RTL for 25 years, where he entered as a sport journalist, and progressively became a reporter and a presenter of programmes. In 1991, he became editor-in-chief and presenter of the midday programme of the station at rue Bayard in Paris. In 1996, he replaced Alain Krauss at the presentation of the interactive programme Les auditeurs ont la parole. In September 2000, not having a friendly relationship anymore with the direction of RTL, he left the radio and was replaced by Christophe Hondelatte, being unemployed.

In 2001, he joined RMC as an advisor of Alain Weill, the new director of the station. He became the famous presenter of the morning programme Bourdin and Co from Monday to Friday, that focuses on information and interactivity with the auditors. The programme began with an interview with a politician. Concerning the stage organization, the journalist and his guest are both at less than one meter of distance, and the incisive tone of Bourdin participated on creating a tension and the success of the programme.

Since 2007, his morning programme Bourdin Direct on RMC is broadcast simultaneously on BFM TV. During the 2007 French presidential election, he co-hosted between the two rounds the duel opposing the candidates Ségolène Royal and Nicolas Sarkozy on BFM TV. He voted François Bayrou at the first round and blank at the second round. At the 2012 French presidential election, he voted François Bayrou at the first round and François Hollande at the second round.

From July to November 2010, he presents Abus de confiance on TF1, a programme about swindlers produced by Julien Courbet. Since October 2018, Bourdin presents a new talk show titled Rien n'est impossible, broadcast live on Friday evening once a month on RMC Story. The programme is broadcast on the first part of the evening and opposes two personalities about a current subject.

== Personal life ==
Bourdin has two daughters from his previous marriage with Marie-Laure Bourdin: Clémence, a restaurant owner, and Fanny, a journalist. He then married journalist Anne Nivat, a war reporter, with whom he had a son Louis, born in November 2006. While his spouse is Protestant, he declares himself atheist.

== Publications ==
- Jean-Jacques Bourdin; Anne Nivat (2007). Éditions Anne Carrière (ed.). À l'écoute (in French). Carrière. p. 216. ISBN 978-2-84337-461-6.
- Jean-Jacques Bourdin; Anne Nivat; Patrick Mahé (2014). Le Cherche midi (ed.). L'homme libre (in French). Cherche midi. p. 177. ISBN 978-2749134741.

== Distinctions ==
- On 26 February 2007, Jean-Jacques Bourdin was honoured Knight of the Legion of Honour.
