= Russian censorship in the Second Chechen War =

Since the start of the Second Chechen War in 1999, Russian federal authorities are alleged to have implemented a plan to use legal and extralegal methods to limit media access to the conflict region.

== Chechen conflict ==
The Russian government's control of all Russian television stations and its use of repressive rules, harassment, censorship, intimidation and attacks on journalists, including the kidnapping of Radio Liberty correspondent Andrei Babitsky by the Russian military, almost completely deprived the Russian public of the independent information on the conflict. Local journalists in Chechnya face intense harassment and obstruction, while foreign journalists and media outlets are pressured into censoring their reports on the conflict, making it nearly impossible for journalists to provide balanced coverage of Chechnya.

Since 2001, with the headlines dominated by news of the Israeli-Arab conflict and the U.S.-led war on terrorism, the conflict has been almost completely forgotten by the international media. Few Russian journalists continue to cover the Chechen conflict, and even fewer dare to criticize the government, instead choosing self-censorship.

In 2005, the Duma passed the law making the journalists being able to have access to and publish information about terrorist attacks only with permission from those directing counter-terrorist operations. On August 2, 2005, responding to the airing of an interview with Shamil Basayev, Moscow banned journalists of the American Broadcasting Company network from working in Russia.

In 2006, the Duma approved the Law on Fighting Extremist Activity, broadening the definition of "extremism" to include media criticism of public officials and provide for imprisonment of up to three years for journalists and the suspension or closure of their publications. The law was used that same year to shut down the Russian-Chechen Friendship Society and convicted its executive director Stanislav Dmitrievsky of "extremist" activities.

Also in 2006, Moscow journalist Boris Stomakhin was sentenced to five years in prison on charges of "inciting ethnic hatred" in his reports about the conflict in Chechnya. On 7 October 2006, Anna Politkovskaya, Russian journalist and political activist well known for her opposition to the Chechen conflict and Russian authorities, was shot dead in Moscow in an apparent contract killing.

In March 2007, a Levada Center poll asked Russians how they thought the situation in Chechnya was covered in the Russian media: 49 percent said they thought the coverage does not give a clear sense of what is happening, while 28 percent said it is not objective and "hides" the problems that exist there. Only 11 percent said they were happy with media coverage of Chechnya.

In September 2007, police and security forces in the neighbouring republic of Ingushetia were issued orders to stop informing the media of any "incidents of a terrorist nature."

Practically all the local Chechen media are now under total control of the pro-Moscow Chechen government of Ramzan Kadyrov.

== Beslan hostage crisis ==
In several incidents reporters critical of the Russian government could not get to Beslan during the crisis. They included Andrey Babitsky, who was indicted on hooliganism after a brawl with two men who picked a fight with him in the Moscow Vnukovo Airport and sentenced to a 15-day arrest. The late Novaya Gazeta journalist Anna Politkovskaya, who had negotiated during the 2002 Moscow siege, was twice prevented by the authorities from boarding a flight. When she eventually succeeded, she fell into a coma after being poisoned aboard an airplane bound to Rostov-on-Don.

According to the report by the Organization for Security and Co-operation in Europe (OSCE), several correspondents were detained in Beslan (including Russians Anna Gorbatova and Oksana Semyonova from Novye Izvestia, Madina Shavlokhova from Moskovskij Komsomolets, Elena Milashina from Novaya Gazeta, and Simon Ostrovskiy from The Moscow Times). Several foreign journalists were also briefly detained, including a group of foreign journalists from Polish Gazeta Wyborcza, French Libération and British The Guardian. The chief of the Moscow bureau of the Arab TV channel Al Jazeera was framed into the possession of a round of ammunition at the airfield in Mineralnye Vody.

Many foreign journalists were exposed to pressure from the security forces and the materials were confiscated from TV crews from ZDF and ARD (Germany), APTN (USA), and Rustavi 2 (Georgia). The crew of Rustavi 2 was arrested; the Georgian Minister of Health said that the correspondent Nana Lezhava, who had been kept for fives days in the Russian pre-trial detention centers, had been poisoned with dangerous psychotropic drugs (like Politkovskaya, Lezhava passed out after being given a cup of tea). The crew from another Georgian TV channel Mze was expelled from Beslan.

Raf Shakirov, chief editor of the Izvestia newspaper, was forced to resign after criticism by the major shareholders of both style and content of the September 4, 2004 issue. In contrast to the less emotional coverage by other Russian newspapers, Izvestia had featured large pictures of dead or injured hostages. It also expressed doubts about the government's version of events.

According to a poll by Levada Center conducted a week after Beslan crisis, 83% of polled Russians believed that the government was hiding at least a part of the truth about the Beslan events from them. According to the poll by Echo of Moscow radio station, 92% of the people polled said that Russian TV channels concealed parts of information.
