= Francis Balle =

French academic teacher and searcher

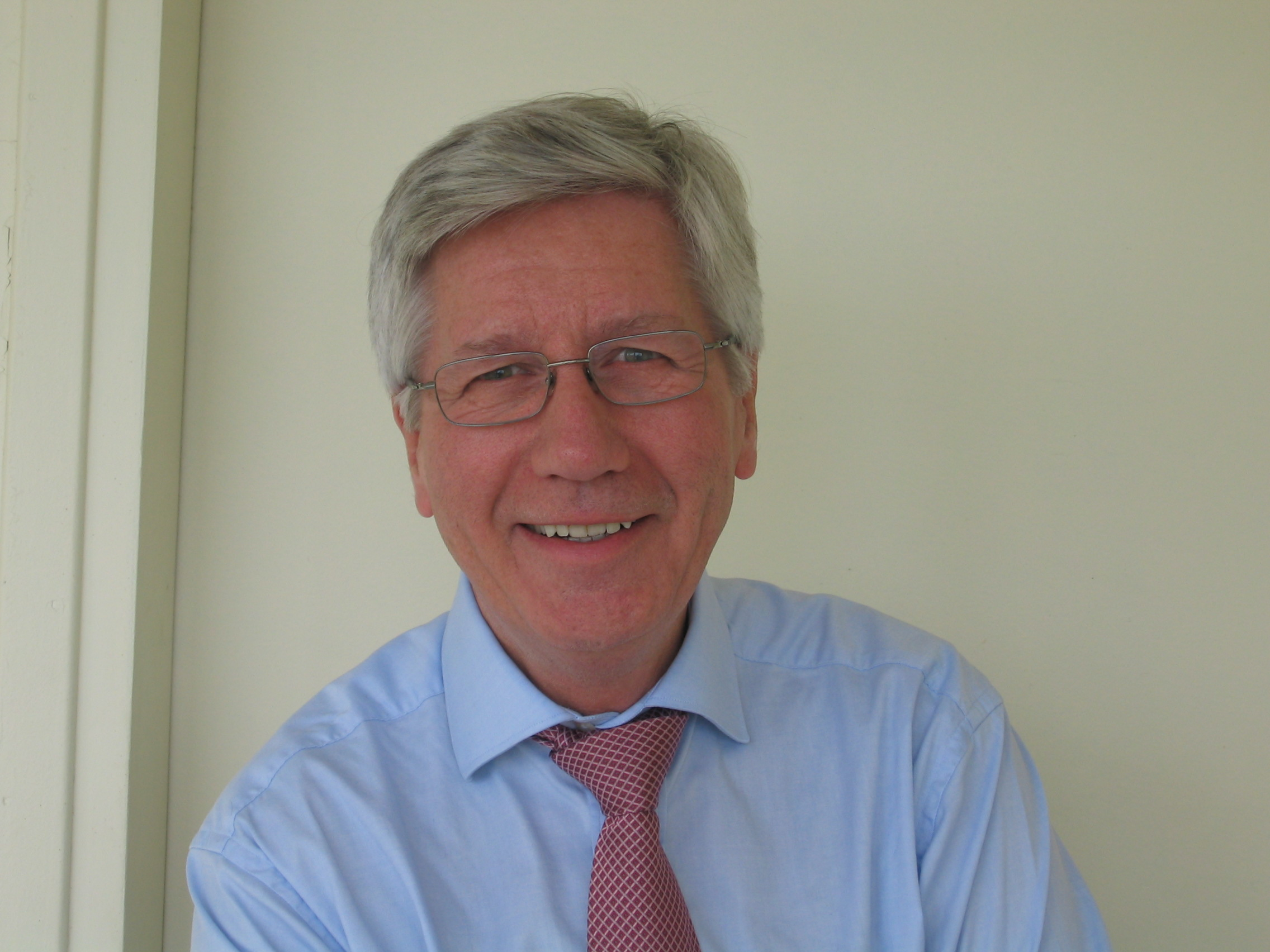
Francis Balle (2005)

Francis Balle (born 1939) is a French academic teacher and searcher. He is also a philosopher, a professor in political science at Panthéon-Assas University and Director of the Institut de Recherche et d’Etudes sur la communication et les médias (IREC) - Institute for Research and Study of Communication and Media. He is the director of a professional master programme in Communication and Multimedia, at Panthéon-Assas University.

Francis Balle is a well known academic and he has occupied several high-ranking positions in official bodies such as a member of the Conseil supérieur de l'audiovisuel.

He teaches courses in sociology of the media and of information and communication technologies at Panthéon-Assas University and at the French Press Institute, has been invited professor at Stanford University. He has extensively published and especially two reference books "Medias et Sociétés" (Media and Societies) 13th edition and "Les Médias" (Media) 3rd edition.

== Bibliography ==
- Lexique Information-Communication ( sous la direction de ) Dalloz, 2006
- Médias et société (12e éd., Montchrestien 2006, 1e éd. 1980) ISBN 2-7076-1421-1
- Les médias (PUF, Que sais-je ?,3me ed. 2007)
- Dictionnaire du web avec Laurent Cohen-Tanugi (Dalloz, 2001) ISBN 2-247-04418-2
- La convergence de l'audiovisuel, de l'informatique et des télécommunications : mythes et réalités (Clés pour le siècle, Dalloz, 2000)
- Les médias (Coll. Dominos Flammarion, 2000) ISBN 2-13-055539-X
- Dictionnaire des médias (dir., Larousse, 1998)
- La politique audiovisuelle extérieure de la France, Rapport officiel pour le Ministère des affaires étrangères (1996)
- Les nouveaux médias avec Gérard Eymery (PUF, Que sais-je ?, 1996) ISBN 2-13-047941-3
- Le Mandarin et le marchand : le juste pouvoir des médias (Flammarion, 1995) ISBN 2-08-067020-4
- Et si la presse n'existait pas (Lattes, 1987)
