= BFM TV =

French rolling news channel

- Logo used since from 25 August 2025
- Type: Radio and television network
- Country: France
- Broadcast area: Worldwide (online)
- Headquarters: 2 Rue du Général Alain de Boissieu, 15th arrondissement of Paris, France

Programming
- Language: French
- Picture format: 1080i HDTV

Ownership
- Owner: RMC BFM
- Parent: CMA CGM
- Sister channels: BFM2; BFM Business; BFM Locales; RMC Découverte; RMC Story; RMC Life; Tech & Co

History
- Founded: 14 December 2004; 21 years ago
- Launched: Radio: 12 July 2022; 4 years ago; Television: 28 November 2005; 20 years ago
- Founder: Alain Weill

Links
- Website: bfmtv.com

Availability

Terrestrial
- TNT: Channel 13 (HD)

Streaming media
- Live stream: bfmtv.com/en-direct/

BFM TV (pronounced [beɛfɛm teve], stylized as BFMTV) is a French news broadcast television and radio network, wholly owned by RMC BFM. The flagship property of the RMC BFM division of CMA CGM, its headquarters are located in Paris.

As the country's most-watched news channel with 10 million daily viewers, BFM TV "boasts a market share in France that is greater than any equivalent news channel around the world". A BBC News commentator considered its economic coverage "clearly pro-business, pro-reform, and anti the old consensus", which is noteworthy because in France, "economic coverage tends to come from the opposite perspective—the state sector and workers taking precedence over private enterprise".

== History ==
BFMTV was launched by the NextRadioTV group (now RMC BFM) as an offshoot of BFM Business, which exclusively focused on business and the economy, on 14 December 2004. BFM is an abbreviation of "Business FM", the original name of BFM Business. Approved by the Conseil supérieur de l'audiovisuel (CSA) on 5 May 2005, it began broadcasting on 28 November 2005. Alain Weill became chairman and CEO in 2005.

The "small independent news channel" became "one of the most influential voices in French media and politics" by distinguishing itself with "a reactive, live format—and dumping the French habit of endless pre-recorded talk". Ratings continuously increased, and it became the most-watched French news channel in June 2008. With a 1.8 national share (as of mid-2012), it greatly exceeds its first competitor, I-Télé (0.7 national share). As its ratings and advertising revenues increased, the budget of the network peaked at €50 million in 2011, compared to €15 million in 2006.

== Spin-off networks ==
=== BFM Sport ===
Launched on 7 June 2016, BFM Sport was the second all-news and sports TV channel in France after Infosport+, sister channel of Canal+. The channel features an 8-minute update every 30 minutes (with the loop all night long). It also carries 3 magazines: After Foot (daily 10 pm – midnight), Le Grand Week-end Sport (weekends 9 am – noon) and 60 Minutes Sport (Sunday–Friday 7 – 8 pm).

=== BFM Paris ===
Launched on 7 November 2016, BFM Paris is mainly inspired by New York's News 12. Its main programming consists of local news updates, traffic, weather, sports, and cultural information. There's a live morning show seven days a week and an evening show on weeknights.

== Programming history ==
=== 1st version (28 November 2005 – 8 May 2006) ===
The channel's first schedule version focused on the morning and evening dayparts.

Weekdays, from 6 am to 9:30 am, during BFM Matin, the channel ran a 30-minute block with Stéphanie de Muru on the 15-minute general news and Thomas Misrachi on the 15-minute financial news. This block kept running throughout the day with images-only newscasts (French: JT tout en image). Between 6 pm and 11:30 pm, during BFM Soir, BFMTV carried a newscast every half-hour with Ruth Elkrief (6 pm/7 pm), Olivier Mazerolle (8 pm), Florence Duprat (7:30 pm/9 pm/11 pm) and Jean-Alexandre Baril (6:30 pm/9 pm/10 pm).

Every evening at 8:30, Mazerolle presented Mazerolle Direct, featuring an interview with one or two guests. The show was replayed two hours later.

Between 11:30 pm and 6 am, there was nothing live except the 11 pm newscast in a looped format.

At the weekend, BFMTV ran image-only newscasts every 15 minutes (except at 7 pm and 8 pm, when Guillaume Vanhems anchored half-hour news reports).

=== 2nd version (9 May 2006 – 3 June 2007) ===
This version was launched at 6 p.m. on 9 May 2006. The channel now put anchors in the set news blocks, especially during BFM Soir, including: Thomas Misrachi (6 – 9:30 a.m.), Ruth Elkrief (6 – 8 p.m.), Olivier Mazerolle (8 – 9 p.m.), Florence Duprat (9 p.m. – midnight) and Thomas Sotto (weekends 6 – 9 p.m.).

Between BFM Matin and BFM Soir, BFMTV now had a branded block, titled BFM Non-Stop, with an updated news flash every 15 minutes and continuous loop of weather reports in-between, with: Guillaume Vanhems (9:30 a.m. – 1 p.m.), Jean-Alexandre Baril (1 – 4:30 p.m.) and Stéphanie De Muru (4:30 – 6 p.m.). However, the images-only weekend news reports were kept, except for the new block from 6 to 9 p.m. by Thomas Sotto.

During the 2007 presidential election, Mazerolle changed his show's name from Mazerolle Direct to Journal de Campagne, still broadcast at the same time (8:30 p.m.). Also, at the same time, a new weekday political show was run on BFM TV, Bourdin 2007, with Jean-Jacques Bourdin, from 8:30 and 9 a.m., simulcast from RMC. From November 2006, Ruth Elkrief started co-anchoring with Hedwige Chevrillon on BFM Business for the new show, Le Duo BFM, which simulcast at 12:30 p.m. on both channels. BFM TV re-ran this show at 9:30 p.m. In January 2008, the show was replaced by La Tribune BFM, which was a Sunday evening interview.

In January 2007, Elkrief also presented Élysee 2007, a nightly political debate from 7 to 8 pm. Also, at the same time, BFM Non-Stop changed presenters: Guillaume Vanhems was no longer on air, Jean-Alexandre Baril now presented the morning news, Stéphanie de Muru was still on the afternoon. From 6 to 7 p.m. and 8 to 8:30 p.m., Nathalie Levy presented news reports with Gilane Barret (general news) and Julian Bugier (business).

=== 3rd version (4 June 2007 – 18 May 2008) ===
In this time, the channel relaunched its infographics (graphics, music, 3D images), schedule and slogan ("Live et Direct" replaced "La nouvelle chaine d'info"). It also received 50 more journalists and presenters.

Christophe Delay, who had formerly anchored from 7 to 8 am on Europe 1, replaced Thomas Misrachi, presenting alongside Karine de Menonville on the first part of Première edition (6 – 8:30 a.m.). Florence Duprat and Thomas Misrachi now presented the new midday newsshow. Weekday evening had a new program, QG de l'info, from 6 to 7 p.m., with Ronald Guintrange and Thomas Sotto. Marc Autheman and Valérie Béranger now presented the weekend evening news from 6 to 9 pm, known as Info 360 le week-end. From 6 am to 6 p.m., BFM TV still kept its image-only reports. Starting 27 August 2007, Bourdin 2007 was renamed as Bourdin Direct. Also, Marc Autheman and Stéphanie de Muru now presented the weekend evening news, renamed as Week-End 360. Thomas Sotto had a new QG de l'info right after this show.

In February 2008, the channel set up a new weekend schedule, affecting only the 6 pm – midnight slot, with four changes:

- Marc Autherman became news presenter for 20H Week-end and QG de l'info from 6 to 7 pm each Saturday.
- Rachid M'Barki became news presenter for 19H Week-end and QG de l'info from 9 to 10 pm each weekend.
- Gilane Barret, who had been anchoring BFM Non-Stop from 9 pm to midnight each weekend since 2007, now joined Stéphanie de Muru for Week-end 360 from 10 pm to midnight.
- Ruth Elkrief and Olivier Mazerolle stopped being on air each Friday.

=== 4th version (19 May 2008 – Present) ===
In January 2008 BFMTV announced that the schedule would change somewhere around March and April, before postponing the change until 19 May 2008. The channel would update the morning and evening news block, while showing sports in partnership with RMC in the afternoon. From January 2008, the channel started carrying La Tribune BFM, in partnership with Dailymotion, Sundays at 6 pm.

In this new schedule, BFMTV now branded themselves as "première chaine d'info en France", with continuous live broadcasting. The continuous news block BFM Non-Stop now has two journalists each timeslot, instead of one, including: Diane Gouffrant and Jean-Alexandre Baril (mornings), Stéphanie de Muru and Gilane Barret/Rachid M'Barki (afternoons (already ending 1 hour earlier)). From May to June 2008, Thomas Sotto anchored Partageons nos idées each Saturday at 8:50 pm.

=== Continuous changes ===
Starting from 2008, BFMTV has been updating its schedule every September, with the announcement that it would broadcast "all live" from 6 am to midnight. Here are some changes:

==== September 2008 ====
Alain Marschall and Olivier Truchot, who had been hosting Les Grandes Gueules from 11 am to 2 pm on RMC since 2004, took over Ruth Elkrief's slot (from 7 pm to 8 pm) with an interactive program offering viewers a chance to comment on current events. Ruth Elkrief started anchoring Midi Ruth Elkrief from noon to 2 pm each weekday. BFM Non-Stop now was presented by: Jean-Alexandre Baril and Roselyne Dubois from 9 am to noon, Stéphanie de Muru and Gilane Barret (newsreader in Midi Ruth Elkrief) from 2 pm to 3 pm, then Florence Duprat and Thomas Misrachi from 3 pm to 6 pm.

While presenting La Tribune BFM-Dailymotion from 7 to 8 pm each Sunday, Olivier Mazerolle became political editor and let Thomas Sotto anchor the 8 pm newscast. Candice Mahout, who was a chronicler in Première edition, presented Showtime from 8:30 to 9 pm, a current affairs magazine.

Finally, Karl Zéro anchored Karl Zéro sur BFM TV at 10:10 pm, an interview with 1 or 2 guests inspired by CNN's Larry King. Info 360, presented by Ronald Guintrange and Nathalie Levy, was broadcast weekdays from 9 to 10 pm, then 11 pm to midnight.

Each weekend, Marc Autheman anchored QG de l'info from 6 to 7 pm and from 8 to 9 pm, followed by the 9 pm – midnight Week-end 360 with Rachid M'Barki and Diane Gouffrant.

In November 2008, Marc Menant joined BFMTV for Partageons nos idées from 7 to 8 pm. 6 versions of this show were presented by Thomas Sotto until summer 2008.

In January 2009, the 8 pm edition of QG de l'info and Showtime were combined to Le 20H with Thomas Sotto. Stéphanie Soumier now presented Partageons nos idées.

In July 2009, Info 360 saw two changes: Nathalie Levy, the co-presenter, joined France 5; and Julian Bugier, the business presenter, joined i-Télé, BFMTV's main competitor.

==== September 2009 ====
Karine de Menonville started presenting Info 360 with Ronald Guintrange (this show now ended at 12:15 am instead of midnight).

Graziella Rodriguez anchored Première edition with Christophe Delay.

Karl Zéro presented the live interview Sarko Info each weeknight at 8:35 pm.

From 7 to 8 pm, the interactive show with Alain Marschall and Olivier Truchot was re-introduced, now with Louise Ekland.

In November 2009, BFMTV launched its new website, bfmtv.com (formerly bfmtv.fr), which now allowed users to watch a selection of programs, instead of just watching live.

In January 2010, BFM TV slightly changed its afternoon and early evening schedule on weekdays. Florence Duprat and Thomas Misrachi now presented BFM Non-Stop from 2 to 5 pm, followed by the new "debate for highlight of the day" BFM Story from 5 to 6 pm with Alain Marschall and Olivier Truchot (this show was called Top Story during the first broadcasting week). Then, from 6 to 8:30 pm, Thomas Sotto presented QG de l'info alongside Pauline Revenaz (Pascale de la Tour du Pin from March 2010). Louise Ekland continued her cultural magazine at 7:40 pm.

In March 2010, BFMTV started showing various chronicles on its 6 am – 6 pm image-only weekend block, press reviews in the morning for example.

At the end of April 2010, several presenters exchanged shifts with each other. Ronald Guintrange joined BFM Non-Stop in the morning with Roselyne Dubois (9 am – noon), replacing Jean-Alexandre Baril who took over BFM Non-Stop in the afternoon with Florence Duprat (2 – 5 pm). Thomas Misrachi, who had presented during the afternoon until then, joined Info 360 (9 pm – 12:15 am) with Stéphanie de Muru for Karine de Ménonville, who was on maternity leave until June 2010. Pascale de La Tour du Pin and Graziella Rodriguès changed roles: the former joined Première édition with Christophe Delay, the latter joined QG de l'info.

Throughout the 2010 World Cup, the channel broadcast many World Cup-related magazines throughout the day. During the week before the World Cup started, Thomas Sotto presented QG de l'info live from South Africa. Rolland Courbis, a consultant on Radio RMC, joined BFM TV, where he presented his morning appointment, Le Tackle de Courbis, and at 6:25 pm and 7:25 pm, Rolland Courbis participated in Coup franc, a program presented by Gilbert Brisbois, journalist-anchor at RMC Sport. Two small parts of the After Foot program, presented by the trio Gilbert Brisbois, Rolland Courbis and Daniel Riolo on RMC, were broadcast simultaneously on BFMTV, every night from 10:45 to 11 pm and from 11:40 pm to midnight.

==== September 2010 ====
In the summer of 2010, Nathalie Levy returned to BFMTV, and joined Info 360 from 9 pm to 10 pm and from 11 pm to 12:30 am (the show was interrupted by QG de l'info). As a result, the evening schedule was changed completely: afternoon BFM Non-Stop was brought forward by an hour but had the same duration (now 3-6 pm); as a consequence, BFM Story was also shifted to a new 6 – 7 pm slot. After two years working the midday slot, Ruth Elkrief joined the evening slot, with a new 7 – 8 pm debate show, and Sarko Info was extended to 8 minutes long. Thomas Sotto's 8 pm newscast was extended to an hour long (finishing now at 9 pm), before his QG de l'info. Louise Ekland's cultural magazine wasn't changed, although many changes took place elsewhere on the schedule like above. Karine de Ménonville joined the weekday midday slot with Stéphanie de Muru and Gilane Barret from noon to 3 pm, known as Midi|15H.

At the weekend, the schedule was also shifted a lot; however, QG de l'info was still broadcast from 10 to 11 pm. The new After Foot, presented by Gilbert Brisbois with Rolland Courbis and Daniel Riolo, was broadcast from 11 pm to midnight (however, since January 2011, 11:45 pm to midnight). The rest of the evening (6 – 8 pm, 9 – 10 pm, 11 – 12:30 am (11 – 11:45 pm and 12 – 12:30 am since January 2011)) carried Info 360 with Nathalie Levy.

In January 2011, following the launch of La Tribune BFM, the channel launched a new Sunday political show from 6 to 8 pm, BFM TV 2012 Le Point-RMC, in partnership with Le Point and the radio station RMC (which belongs to the same group as BFMTV). For two hours, a political personality answers the questions of Olivier Mazerolle on particular topics.

In the summer of 2011, Thomas Sotto left BFMTV to join M6 as a "Capital" presenter. Philippe Verdier also left the channel to join France 2 as a weathercaster.

==== September 2011 ====
Jean-Jacques Bourdin now presents, until today, Bourdin Direct from 8:35 to 9 am. Ruth Elkrief, after her show, stayed on the air until 9 pm to co-present the 8 pm newscast with Alain Marschall.

At the end of August 2011, BFMTV reorganised its evening schedule. Alain Marschall left BFM Story to present the 8 pm weekday newscast (with Marc Autheman on the weekend), and as a result, Olivier Truchot became BFM Story's standalone presenter. Jean-Rémi Baudot was responsible for news updates between 6 and 8 pm, in addition to his evening business shift which he has been working since the beginning of 2009. Nathalie Levy stayed on the air on Info 360, but the broadcasting time would increase (no longer two separate hour-long blocks but now a continuous three-hour block from 9 pm to midnight). Her co-partner on this show was now Jean-Baptiste Boursier (after leaving I-Télé) and he also presented the midnight newscast on BFMTV. Fanny Agostini joined the channel from RMC to present evening weather.

In September 2011, BFMTV added several multi-hour shows with set hosts and tone to compartmentalize Non-Stop (which, until then, didn't feature on-air talent of any kind). Fabien Crombé, who joined channel from RMC, and Céline Pitelet presented live news coverage from 6 am to 10 am, known as Week-end Première. Non-Stop, now added a Week-End moniker, only aired in two separate blocks from 10 am to noon and 2 pm to 6 pm. While Stéphanie de Muru and Rachid M'Barki presented the morning edition, the afternoon team was Céline Couratin and Graziella Rodrigues (plus Jean-Alexandre Baril, who left the weekday afternoon edition of Non-Stop and replaced by Mathieu Coache). Also, the morning team presented the all-new midday Midi|14H Week-End. Lucie Nuttin and Damien Gourlet (newcomers from LCP and Europe 1, respectively) presented together Week-End 360 from 6 pm to 8 pm, 9 pm to 10 pm, 11 pm to 11:45 pm and midnight to 12:30 am.

At the beginning of 2012, two chroniclers rejoined the channel: Emmanuel Lechypre in business and Ulysse Gosset in international politics.

==== September 2012 ====
At the end of August 2012, BFMTV updated its evening schedule. From 9 pm to 11 pm, Nathalie Levy presented Info 360 with Jean-Rémi Baudot, and then the midnight newscast. Jean-Baptiste Boursier had a new role: presenting the all-new Le Soir BFM from 11 pm to midnight, a show focusing on the facts of the day's news (however, in March 2013, Le Soir BFM started at 10:30 pm).

The weekday schedule was also refreshed: 9 am – noon: Non-Stop with Roselyne Dubois and Damien Gourlet; noon-3 pm: Midi|15H with Karine de Ménonville and Ronald Guintrange; 3 pm – 6 pm: Non-Stop with Gilane Barret and Florence Duprat. Mathieu Coache left his afternoon shift to become Washington's correspondent.

On weekends, BFMTV had a new weekly analysis programme: 7 Jours BFM, presented by Thomas Misrachi and aired every Saturday from 6 pm to 8 pm. Frédéric de Lanouvelle and François Gapihan rejoined Stéphanie de Muru on morning Non-Stop Week-End and Midi|14H Week-End. At the afternoon Non-Stop Week-End (2 – 6 pm), Sandra Gandoin, who previously worked as a substitute host for Céline Couratin, now became an official presenter alongside Jean-Alexandre Baril. Lucie Nuttin had a new co-host on Week-end 360: Maxime Cogny.

==== September 2013 ====
BFMTV added a new block for Première edition from 4:30 am to 6 am, presented by Céline Pitelet and Jean-Rémi Baudot; then Christophe Delay and Pascale de La Tour du Pin anchored the normal 6 – 8:30 am slot. This decision made Première edition the earliest live news programme in France.

In July 2013, Apolline de Malherbe, who returned to BFMTV, replaced Anna Cabana on the morning political segment at 6:50 am and 7:50 am; plus she also had another political-related show alongside Hedwige Chevrillon, BFM Politique every Sunday from 6 pm to 8 pm.

==== September 2014 ====
Nathalie Levy's Info 360 was replaced by a new show: News et Compagnie alongside Laurent Neumann and Emmanuel Lechypre from 9 pm to 10 pm Mondays to Thursdays.

Jean-Baptiste Boursier's Le Soir BFM was renamed Grand Angle and airing Mondays to Thursdays from 10 pm to midnight. Rachid M'Barki, who presented news bulletins every half-hour between 6 pm and 8 pm, now also presented two new newscasts at 9 pm and midnight.

Dominique Mari replaced Fabien Combé on 6 am – 10 am Week-end Première. Midi|14H Week-end was dropped in favor of an extra two-hour block of Non-Stop Week-End.

Christophe Hondelatte rejoined BFMTV to present the 8 pm weekend newscast as well as Hondelatte Direct from 10 pm to midnight Fridays to Sundays alongside newsreader Lucie Nuttin. Fabien Combé had a new role: presenting News Week-end from 9 pm to 10 pm Fridays to Sundays as well as Le Journal de la Nuit Week-end.

On weekends, Philippe Gaudin anchored Non-Stop Week-End from 2 pm to 6 pm alongside Graziella Rodrigues.

Throughout 2015, BFMTV was, according to Médiametrie, France's number one news channel. In July 2015, almost 34 million French people watched this channel, which is nearly 9 million daily in average.

== Criticism ==
As a rolling news channel, BFMTV has been criticized for "accelerat[ing] reality, and creat[ing] pressure for instant solutions", as well as being conflating what it means to be "popular" and "populist" due to its pursuit of audiences. Thus other media institutions have insinuated that BFMTV has furthered the cause of Marine Le Pen, the head of the nationalist Front national political party. For example, BFMTV "star interviewer" Jean-Jacques Bourdin has been ridiculed for "rejoicing at the prospect of a President Le Pen"; such insinuations tend to arouse "fury" in the BFMTV newsroom. In March 2014 French media regulator Conseil supérieur de l'audiovisuel (CSA) examined BFMTV's distribution of airtime for election candidates, stating that the channel gave UMP and Socialist Party candidates limited access while allowing the Front National "persistent overrepresentation".

Daniel Schneidermann, a media commentator writing for the left-wing Libération, thinks that BFMTV "may not set out to be right-wing but it ends up that way de facto", claiming that BFMTV "over-cover[s] her" because they need good ratings and Le Pen "always gets a good audience". Similarly, Schneidermann notes that they prioritize coverage of sensational issues such as crime stories to the detriment of "social" stories. Indeed, Bourdin and another TV host Christophe Hondelatte have been described as a "duo of shock". For example, Hondelatte revealed that his pay is tied to the size of the audience he attracts.

The French media regulator Conseil supérieur de l'audiovisuel (CSA) has stated in 2014 that BFMTV allowed the Front National "persistent overrepresentation" during the 2014 French municipal elections. BFMTV responded, claiming to "take note of this call to order" and that the news channel "will respect the law well and will reach fairness on 21 March at midnight, as it requires."

BFMTV was sued in April 2015 for its coverage of the 9 January 2015 Porte de Vincennes siege. Six hostages hiding in the Hypercacher kosher grocery store claimed that the network endangered their lives by broadcasting the fact that they were seeking refuge in the grocery's refrigerator while the siege was still ongoing.

In mid-January 2023, Rachid M'Barki, journalist who presents the night newspaper, was suspended following an internal investigation for foreign interference concerning content broadcast by the channel in troubled circumstances about the economic forum of Dakhla. According to an investigation by France Info, the "information" was provided by an Israeli agency, run by former members of the army and the secret services and specialized in influence, electoral manipulation, and disinformation.

== Broadcasting ==
It was launched first on the French digital terrestrial television (TNT, or télévision numérique terrestre) and is broadcast free 24 hours a day, by satellite on CanalSat (see frequencies below), French digital terrestrial television, by DSL providers Free, Neuf, Orange, by mobile television on Orange and SFR, by cable provider Numericable, and live on the channel's website (via Windows Media streaming).

BFMTV has a policy called priorite au direct that mandates that live outside feeds are used whenever possible.

BFMTV is freely broadcast by satellite in DVB-S2 MPEG-4:

- Hot Bird 13°E: 12.692 GHz Pol H, SR 27500 FEC 2/3, SD
- Astra 19.2°E: 11.895 GHz, Pol V, SR 29700 FEC 2/3, HD encrypted in Nagravision and Viaccess

== BFM TV anchors ==
BFMTV journalists, who tend to be young, "pride themselves on doing things differently".

Currently, the channel has 250 journalists, with 49 work on screen.

=== Business ===
- Nicolas Doze
- Emmanuel Lechypre

=== Culture ===
- Philippe Dufreigne
- Candice Mahout
- Lorène de Susbielle

=== Hi-tech ===
- Anthony Morel

=== Justice ===
- Dominique Rizet

=== News ===
Gilane Barret	Jean-Jacques Bourdin
Jean-Baptiste Boursier	Aurélie Casse
Alice Darfeuille	Christophe Delay
Benjamin Dubois	Florence Duprat
Ruth Elkrief	Stefan Etcheverry
Adeline François	François Gapihan
Philippe Gaudin	Damien Gourlet
Ronald Guintrange	Sophie Hébrard
Alain Marschall	Karine de Ménonville
Julien Migaud-Muller	Céline Pitelet
Perrine Storme	Maxime Switek
Bruce Toussaint	Olivier Truchot

=== Politics ===
- Éric Brunet
- Anna Cabana
- Ruth Elkrief
- Hervé Gattegno
- Bruno Jeudy
- Camille Langlade
- Apolline de Malherbe
- Laurent Neumann
- Anne Saurat-Dubois
- Catherine Tricot

=== Sports ===
- Thibaut Giangrande

=== Talk-show ===
- Yves Calvi
- Laurent Ruquier

=== Weather ===
- Patricia Charbonnier
- Marc Hay
- Virgilia Hess
- Virginie Hilssone-Lévy
- Sandra Larue
- Christophe Person
- Loïc Rivières
- Guillaume Séchet

== Prix Spécial BFM Business de la Bourse ==
The Prix Spécial is awarded to a personality or an investment company. Performance, net flows and profile with the French and international financial communities are the key criterion retained to award the prize.

== See also ==
- 24-hour news cycle
- Television in France

== Bibliography ==
- « Un chat rate son TGV, BFM accourt », in Hallier, tout feu tout flamme, Jean-Pierre Thiollet, Neva Editions, 2023, p. 59-64. ISBN 978 2 35055 309 2
