= Ruth Elkrief =

French television journalist (born 1960)

- Born: 1 December 1960 (age 65); Meknes, Morocco
- Education: Sciences Po; Centre de formation des journalistes
- Occupation: Journalist
- Employer: LCI (La Chaîne Info)
- Spouse: Claude Czechowski
- Children: 2 daughters

Ruth Elkrief (born 1 December 1960 in Meknes, Morocco) is a French-Moroccan television journalist. She worked for the 24-hour news channel BFM TV from 2005 to 2021.

== Early life ==
Ruth Elkrief was born in Meknes, Morocco. Her great-uncle, Shalom Messas, was a rabbi. She emigrated to France with her family as a teenager.

Elkrief graduated from Sciences Po and later earned a postgraduate degree in journalism from the Centre de Formation des Journalistes.

== Career ==
Elkrief was a correspondent for TF1 in Washington, D.C. in 1990. A year later, in 1991, she was appointed head of its political programmes. She joined La Chaîne Info in 1994 and BFM TV in 2005. In January 2021, she announced that she was leaving the channel. On 31March 2021, Fabien Namias, vice-managing director of the TF1 group's all-news channel, announced that Ruth Elkrief would be joining LCI.

Elkrief became a Knight of the Legion of Honour in 2008.

== Personal life ==
Elkrief is married to Claude Czechowski. They have two daughters.
