= French Press Institute =

Public institution of research and higher education in Paris, France

Coordinates: 48.850239°N 2.326758°E

- Institut français de presse
- Type: Public
- Established: 1937
- Affiliations: Panthéon-Assas University
- Director: Valérie Devillard
- Students: Approximately 500
- Location: Paris, France
- Website: ifp.u-paris2.fr

The French Press Institute (French: Institut français de presse, commonly referred to as "IFP") is a public institution of research and higher education, which has served as the department for communication and journalism studies at Panthéon-Assas University since 1970. Founded in 1937, the French Press Institute is the oldest and one of the finest French schools in the field of journalism and communication studies.

== History ==
=== The establishment of the institute ===
Founded in 1937 in the Faculty of Law of Paris, the Institut des Sciences de la Presse (Press Sciences Institute) became the Institut français de presse in 1951. The French Press Institute is the first organization to have been dedicated to media studies.

After the war, owing to international partnerships, the French Press Institute became a leading international institute regarding media evolution studies. Its first director, Fernand Terrou, took part in the redaction of the declaration of Press rights of San Francisco in 1948 and formed a bond with the Institute for Communication Research of Stanford University. In 1957, with UNESCO, the French Press Institute supported the establishment of the International Association for Studies and Research on Information and Communication (IAMCR). After the division of the University of Paris in thirteen autonomous universities in 1970, the French Press Institute joined Panthéon-Assas University.

=== The directors of the institute ===
- 1951–1976: Fernand Terrou
- 1976–1986: Francis Balle
- 1986–1994: Pierre Albert
- 1994–1999: Rémy Rieffel
- 1999–2004: Nadine Toussaint-Desmoulins
- 2004–2009: Josiane Jouët
- 2009–2015: Nathalie Sonnac
- Since February 2015: Valérie Devillard

== See also ==
- Education in France
- Panthéon-Assas University

== Sources ==
- Décret n^{o} 70-246 du 21 mars 1970 relatif à la mise en place des universités (in French).
