= List of television stations in France =

This is a list of TV services available on digital terrestrial, satellite, internet streaming and cable systems in France.

== National DTT channels (Metropolitan France) ==
List available from 1st October 2025
| EPG No. | Channel | Type | Format on DTT | Broadcast hours | Owner/parent company | Multiplex | Note |
|---|---|---|---|---|---|---|---|
| 1 | TF1 | Generalist | 16:9 HDTV | 24 hours | Groupe TF1 | R6 | Privatised during 1987. |
| 2 | France 2 | Generalist | 16:9 HDTV | 24 hours | France Télévisions | R1 | |
| 3 | France 3 | Generalist and regional | 16:9 HDTV | 24 hours | France Télévisions | R1 | |
| 4 | France 4 | Educational, children and cultural | 16:9 HDTV | 24 hours | France Télévisions | R1 | |
| 5 | France 5 | Generalist | 16:9 HDTV | 24 hours | France Télévisions | R4 | |
| 6 | M6 | Generalist | 16:9 HDTV | 24 hours | Groupe M6 | R4 | |
| 7 | Arte | Cultural | 16:9 HDTV | 24 hours | ARTE France | R4 | |
| 8 | LCP | Legislature | 16:9 HDTV | 24 hours | National Assembly, Senate | R6 | |
| 9 | W9 | Generalist | 16:9 HDTV | 24 hours | Groupe M6 | R4 | |
| 10 | TMC | Generalist | 16:9 HDTV | 24 hours | Groupe TF1 | R6 | |
| 11 | TFX | Generalist | 16:9 HDTV | 24 hours | Groupe TF1 | R6 | |
| 12 | Gulli | Children | 16:9 HDTV | 24 hours | Groupe M6 | R2 | |
| 13 | BFM TV | News | 16:9 HDTV | 24 hours | RMC BFM | R2 | |
| 14 | CNews | News | 16:9 HDTV | 24 hours | Canal+ S.A. | R2 | |
| 15 | LCI | News | 16:9 HDTV | 24 hours | Groupe TF1 | R6 | |
| 16 | France Info | News | 16:9 HDTV | 24 hours | France Télévisions | R1 | |
| 17 | CStar | Generalist | 16:9 HDTV | 24 hours | Canal+ S.A. | R2 | |
| 18 | T18 | Generalist | 16:9 HDTV | 24 hours | CMI France | R2 | |
| 19 | Novo 19 | Generalist | 16:9 HDTV | 24 hours | Groupe Sipa – Ouest-France | R2 | |
| 20 | TF1 Séries Films | Movies and series | 16:9 HDTV | 24 hours | Groupe TF1 | R7 | |
| 21 | L'Équipe | Sports | 16:9 HDTV | 24 hours | Groupe Amaury | R7 | |
| 22 | 6ter | Generalist | 16:9 HDTV | 24 hours | Groupe M6 | R4 | |
| 23 | RMC Story | Generalist | 16:9 HDTV | 24 hours | RMC BFM | R7 | |
| 24 | RMC Découverte | Documentary | 16:9 HDTV | 24 hours | RMC BFM | R7 | |
| 25 | RMC Life | Generalist | 16:9 HDTV | 24 hours | RMC BFM | R7 | |
| 26 | Paris Première | Generalist | 16:9 HDTV | 24 hours | Groupe M6 | R4 | |
| 30 to 38 | Regional channels | Various | 16:9 HDTV | Various | Various | Various | |
| 52 | France 2 UHD | Generalist | 16:9 UHDTV | 24 hours | France Télévisions | R9 | |

== National DTT Channels (Overseas France) ==
National channels of overseas france
| Channel Number | Channel | Type | Group | Launched | Multiplex | Format |
|---|---|---|---|---|---|---|
| 2/3/4 | France 2 | Public Generalist | France Télévisions | 30 November 2010 | ROM 1 | 576i (SD) |
| 3/4/5 | France 3 | Public Generalist | France Télévisions | 30 November 2010 | ROM 1 | 576i (SD) |
| 4/5/6 | France 4 | Public Educational, children and cultural | France Télévisions | 30 November 2010 | ROM 1 | 576i (SD) |
| 5/6/7 | France 5 | Public Generalist | France Télévisions | 30 November 2010 | ROM 1 | 576i (SD) |
| 7/8/9 | Arte | Public Cultural | Arte France; Arte Deutschland TV | 30 November 2010 | ROM 1 | 576i (SD) |
| 8/9/10 | France Info | Public News channel | France Télévisions | 8 April 2019 | ROM 1 | 576i (SD) |
| 22 | France 2 UHD | Public Generalist | France Télévisions | 23 January 2024 | ROM U | 1080i (UHD) |

Previously, France Ô was on channels 6/7/8 in Overseas France and channel 19 in Metropolitan France until 24 August 2020.

== Regional DTT channels ==
List available from 26 January 2026:

| EPG No. | Channel | Notes | Area | Multiplex | Format |
|---|---|---|---|---|---|
| 30 | Angers Télé | | Angers | R1 | 16:9 |
| 30 | BFM Alsace | | Strasbourg | R1 | 16:9 |
| 30 | BFM Lyon | | Lyon | R1, R15 | 16:9 |
| 30 | BFM Marseille Provence | | Marseille | R1 | 16:9 |
| 30 | BFM Toulon Var | | Toulon, Hyères | R1 | 16:9 |
| 30 | Télé Paese | | Corsica | R15 | 16:9 |
| 30 | TVPI | | Bayonne | R1 | 16:9 |
| 31 | 8 Mont-Blanc | | Annecy Chambéry | R15 | 16:9 |
| 31 | BFM DICI Alpes du Sud | | Gap | R1 | 16:9 |
| 31 | BFM DICI Haute Provence | | Alpes-de-Haute-Provence | R15 | 16:9 |
| 31 | BFM Grand Lille | | Lille | R15 | 16:9 |
| 31 | BFM Nice Côte d'Azur | | Nice | R1 | 16:9 |
| 31 | Tébéo | | Brest | R1 | 16:9 |
| 31 | Télénantes | | Nantes | R1 | 16:9 |
| 31 | TL7 | | Saint-Étienne | R1 | 16:9 |
| 31 | Canal 31 | Shared airtime | Île-de-France | Multi 7 | 16:9 |
| 31 | Vosges TV | | Épinal | R1 | 16:9 |
| 32 | 20 Minutes TV Île-de-France | | Île-de-France | Multi 7 | 16:9 |
| 32 | BFM Grand Littoral | | Boulogne-sur-Mer, Dunkirk | R1 | 16:9 |
| 32 | Canal 32 | | Troyes | R15 | 16:9 |
| 33 | BFM Normande | | Rouen, Neufchâtel-en-Bray | R1 | 16:9 |
| 33 | Via Stella | | Corsica | R1 | 16:9 |
| 33 | LDV Média | | Monistrol-sur-Loire | R15 | 16:9 |
| 33 | LMtv Sarthe | | Le Mans | R1 | 16:9 |
| 33 | Moselle TV | | Metz Forbach Verdun Longwy Sarrebourg | R1 | 16:9 |
| 33 | TébéSud | | Lorient Vannes | R1 | 16:9 |
| 33 | TLC | | Cholet | TVO | 16:9 |
| 33 | TV7 | | Bordeaux Arcachon | R1 | 16:9 |
| 34 | Le Figaro TV Île-de-France | | Île-de-France | Multi 7 | 16:9 |
| 34 | MATÉLÉ | Official site | Saint-Quentin Hirson | R1 | 16:9 |
| 34 | TV Vendée | | La Roche-sur-Yon | TVO | 16:9 |
| 35 | TVR | | Rennes | R1 | 16:9 |
| 36 | Bip TV | | Issoudun | R1 | 16:9 |
| 37 | Val de Loire TV | | Tours Blois | R1 | 16:9 |
| 38 | TG+ | | Grenoble | R1 | 16:9 |

== Regional DTT Channels (Overseas France) ==
Regional Channels of Overseas France
| Broadcast Area | Channel Number | Name | Type | Launched | Multiplex | Format |
|---|---|---|---|---|---|---|
| Guadeloupe | 1 | Guadeloupe La Première | Public Generalist | 1 January 2018 | ROM 1 | 1080i (HD) |
| Guadeloupe | 3 | Canal 10 | Private Generalist | 30 November 2010 | ROM 1 | 576i (SD) |
| French Guiana | 1 | Guyane La Première | Public Generalist | 1 January 2018 | ROM 1 | 1080i (HD) |
| Martinique | 1 | Martinique La Première | Public Generalist | 1 January 2018 | ROM 1 | 1080i (HD) |
| Martinique | 2 | ViàATV | Private Generalist | 11 October 2018 | ROM 1 | 576i (SD) |
| Martinique | 3 | KMT | Community | 30 November 2010 | ROM 1 | 576i (SD) |
| Martinique | 11 | Zitata TV | Private Generalist | 8 May 2021 | ROM L | 576i (SD) |
| Mayotte | 1 | Mayotte La Première | Public Generalist | 1 January 2018 | ROM 1 | 1080i (HD) |
| Mayotte | 9 | Kwezi TV | Private Generalist | 28 March 2012 | ROM 1 | 576i (SD) |
| Mayotte | 10 | Chiconi FM-TV | Community | 16 August 2022 | ROM 1 | 576i (SD) |
| New Caledonia | 1 | Nouvelle-Calédonie La Première | Public Generalist | 1 January 2018 | ROM 1 | 1080i (HD) |
| New Caledonia | 10 | Caledonia | Private Generalist | 4 May 2017 | ROM 1 | 576i (SD) |
| French Polynesia | 1 | Polynésie La 1ère | Public Generalist | 1 January 2018 | ROM 1 | 1080i (HD) |
| French Polynesia | 2 | TNTV | Private Generalist | 30 November 2010 | ROM 1 | 576i (SD) |
| Réunion | 1 | Réunion La Première | Public Generalist | 1 January 2018 | ROM 1 | 1080i (HD) |
| Réunion | 2 | Antenne Réunion | Private Generalist | 30 November 2010 | ROM 1 | 576i (SD) |
| Saint Barthélemy | 1 | Guadeloupe La Première | Public Generalist | 1 January 2018 | ROM 1 | 1080i (HD) |
| Saint-Martin | 1 | Guadeloupe La Première | Public Generalist | 1 January 2018 | ROM 1 | 1080i (HD) |
| Saint Pierre and Miquelon | 1 | Saint Pierre et Miquelon La Première | Public Generalist | 1 January 2018 | ROM 1 | 1080i (HD) |
| Wallis and Futuna | 1 | Wallis et Futuna La Première | Public Generalist | 1 January 2018 | ROM 1 | 1080i (HD) |

== Satellite television ==
=== Bis Télévisions ===
- 6ter
- Automoto La chaîne
- AB1
- AB3
- ABX
- Action
- Animaux
- Arte
- beIN Sports 1
- BFM TV
- BabyFirst
- Chasse et Pêche
- CNews
- CStar
- Dorcel TV
- France 2
- France 2 UHD
- France 3
- France 4
- France 5
- France 24
- France Info
- Golf Channel France
- Gulli
- TF1 Séries Films
- LCP-AN/Public Sénat
- Lucky Jack TV
- M6
- Mangas
- Novo 19
- RMC Découverte
- RMC Life
- RMC Story
- RTL9
- Science et Vie TV
- LCI
- T18
- TF1
- TF1 Séries Films
- TFX
- TMC
- Toute l'Histoire
- Trek
- Téva
- Via Stella
- W9
- XXL

=== Canal+ ===
This is a list of channels carried by Canal+, as of July 2026:

- Automoto La chaîne
- AB1
- Action
- Al Jazeera English
- Animaux
- Arte France
- Arte Germany
- Astrocenter TV
- beIN Sports 1
- beIN Sports 2
- beIN Sports 3
- beIN Sports Max (4-10)
- BFM Business
- BFM TV
- Boomerang France
- Canal+
- Canal+ UHD
- Canal+ Box Office
- Canal+ Cinéma(s)
- Canal+ Docs
- Canal+ Foot
- Canal+ Grand Écran
- Canal+ Kids
- Canal+ Live (1-18)
- Canal+ Premier League
- Canal+ Sport
- Canal+ Sport 360
- Canal J
- Cartoon Network France
- Cartoonito France
- Chasse et Pêche
- Ciné+ Classic
- Ciné+ Émotion
- Ciné+ Famiz
- Ciné+ Festival
- Ciné+ Frisson
- CNBC France
- CNN International
- CNews
- CNews Prime
- Comédie+
- Comedy Central France
- CStar
- DAZN 1
- DAZN 2
- DAZN 3
- DAZN 4
- DAZN 5
- Deutsche Grammophon+
- Discovery Channel France
- Dorcel TV
- Dorcel XXX
- Equidia
- Europe 1 TV
- Europe 2 Pop TV
- Euronews
- Eurosport 1
- Eurosport 2
- Eurosport 360 (1-32)
- France 2
- France 2 UHD
- France 3
- France 4
- France 5
- France 24 French
- France 24 English
- France Info
- Game One
- Golf+
- GONG
- GONG MAX
- Gulli
- Infosport+
- Investigation Discovery France
- I24news
- KTO
- La Chaîne Météo
- LCI
- LCP
- LCP AN Public Sénat
- L'Équipe
- Le Figaro TV
- M6
- M6 Music
- Man-X
- Mangas
- MGG TV
- Melody
- Mezzo
- Mezzo Live HD
- Mieux
- Museum TV
- MTV
- Nickelodeon France
- Nickelodeon Junior France
- Nicktoons France
- Novelas TV
- Novo 19
- NRJ Hits
- OCS
- Paris Première
- Pink X
- Piwi+
- Planète+
- Planète+ Adventure
- Planète+ Crime
- Polar+
- Public Sénat
- RFM TV
- RMC Découverte
- RMC Life
- RMC Story
- RTL9
- Seasons
- sérieclub
- Sport en France
- T18
- TCM Cinéma France
- Télétoon+
- Télétoon+1
- Téva
- TF1
- TF1 Séries Films
- TFX
- TiJi
- TLC France
- TMC
- Toute l'Histoire
- Trace Urban
- TV Breizh
- TV Monaco
- TV5Monde
- 8 Mont-Blanc
- Union TV
- Ushuaia TV
- Vixen TV
- W9
- Warner TV France
- Warner TV Next
- XXL

== Cable television & IPTV ==
=== SFR TV ===
This is a list of channels carried by SFR TV, as of July 2026:

- 6ter
- 13ème Rue
- AB1
- Action
- After Foot TV
- Animaux
- Arte France
- Arte Germany
- Astrocenter TV
- Automoto La chaîne
- Baby TV France
- Bblack Africa
- Bblack Caribbean
- Bblack Classic
- beIN Sports 1
- beIN Sports 2
- beIN Sports 3
- beIN Sports Max (4-10)
- BFM 2
- BFM Business
- BFM DICI Alpes du Sud
- BFM DICI Haute-Provence
- BFM Grand Lille
- BFM Grand Littoral
- BFM Lyon
- BFM Marseille Provence
- BFM Nice Côte-d'Azur
- BFM Normandie
- BFM Toulon Var
- BFM TV
- Boomerang France
- Bravo France
- Canal+
- Canal+ Box Office
- Canal+ Cinéma(s)
- Canal+ Docs
- Canal+ Foot
- Canal+ Grand Écran
- Canal+ Kids
- Canal+ Live (1-7)
- Canal+ Sport
- Canal+ Sport 360
- Canal J
- Cartoon Network France
- Cartoonito France
- Chasse et Pêche
- Ciné+ Classic
- Ciné+ Émotion
- Ciné+ Famiz
- Ciné+ Festival
- Ciné+ Frisson
- Clubbing TV
- CNBC France
- CNews
- CNews Prime
- CNN International
- Comédie+
- Crime District
- CStar
- DAZN 1
- Discovery Channel France
- Dorcel TV
- Dorcel TV Africa
- Dorcel XXX
- DreamWorks TV France
- Equidia
- Europe 1 TV
- Europe 2 Pop TV
- Euronews French
- Euronews English
- Eurosport 1
- Eurosport 2
- Fashion TV
- France 2
- France 2 UHD
- France 3
- France 4
- France 5
- France 24 French
- France 24 English
- France 24 Arabic
- France 24 Spanish
- France Info
- Golf Channel France
- GONG
- GONG MAX
- Gulli
- Histoire TV
- Hot Video TV
- Hustler TV
- I24news French
- I24news English
- InfoSport+
- Investigation Discovery France
- Journal Du Golf TV
- KTO
- L'Équipe
- La Chaîne Météo
- LCI
- LCP AN Public Sénat
- LCP
- Ligue 1+
- Ligue 1+ (2-10)
- Lucky Jack.tv
- Luxe.TV
- M6
- M6 Music
- Man-X
- Mangas
- MCM Top
- Melody d'Afrique
- Men TV
- Men's UP TV
- Mezzo
- Mezzo Live
- MGG TV
- Mieux
- MTV
- Museum TV
- My Zen TV
- Nickelodeon France
- Nickelodeon +1
- Nickelodeon Junior France
- Nicktoons France
- Novo 19
- NRJ Hits
- OCS
- OL Play
- Paris Première
- Penthouse Gold
- Pink TV
- Piwi+
- Planète+
- Planète+ Crime
- Planète+ Aventure
- Polar+
- Private TV
- Public Sénat
- RFM TV
- RMC Découverte
- RMC Life
- RMC Sport 1
- RMC Sport Access
- RMC Sport Live (2-4)
- RMC Story
- RTL9
- Science et Vie TV
- Seasons
- sérieclub
- SciFi
- Sport en France
- T18
- TCM Cinéma France
- Tech & Co
- Télétoon+
- Télétoon+1
- Téva
- TF1
- TF1 4K
- TF1 Séries Films
- TFX
- TiJi
- TLC France
- TMC
- Toute l'Histoire
- Trace Caribbean
- Trace Gospel
- Trace Toca
- Trace Urban
- Trek
- TV Breizh
- TV5 Monde
- Union TV
- Ushuaïa TV
- Vixen TV
- W9
- Warner TV France
- Warner TV Next
- XXL

=== Free TV ===
- 6ter
- 360 Tunebox
- A+
- B SMART
- BFM 2
- BFM Business
- BFM TV
- Canal+
- Canal+ Box Office
- Canal+ Cinéma(s)
- Canal+ Docs
- Canal+ Foot
- Canal+ Grand Écran
- Canal+ Kids
- Canal+ Séries
- Canal+ Sport
- Canal+ Sport 360
- Canal J
- CNews
- CNews Prime
- Comedy Central France
- CStar
- Disney Channel France
- Demain TV
- Drive In Movie Channel
- Eurochannel
- Europe 1 TV
- Europe 2 Pop TV
- France 2
- France 2 UHD
- France 3
- France 4
- France 5
- France Info
- Free Foot
- Gulli
- L'Équipe
- L'Esprit Sorcier TV
- LCI
- LCP AN Public Sénat
- Ligue 1+
- M6
- M6 4K
- M6 Music
- Melody
- Melody d'Afrique
- MGG TV
- Mieux
- MTV
- National Geographic France
- Nickelodeon France
- Nickelodeon Junior France
- Nicktoons France
- Novelas TV
- Novo 19
- NRJ Hits
- Paris Première
- RMC Découverte
- RMC Life
- RMC Story
- RTL9
- Souvenirs From Earth
- Stingray Classica
- Stingray CMusic
- Stingray DJazz
- Stingray Festival 4K
- Stingray iConcerts
- T18
- Téva
- TF1
- TF1 4K
- TF1 Séries Films
- TFX
- TiJi
- TMC
- Trace Africa
- Trace Ayiti
- Trace Caribbean
- Trace Gospel
- Trace Kitoko
- Trace Latina
- Trace Teranga
- Trace Toca
- Trace Vanilla
- Trace Urban
- TV5Monde
- W9

=== Orange TV ===
- 6ter
- Boomerang France
- Boomerang +1 France
- B SMART
- BFM Business
- BFM TV
- Canal+
- Canal J
- Cartoonito France
- CNews
- CNews Prime
- Comedy Central France
- CStar
- Disney Channel France
- France 2
- France 2 UHD
- France 3
- France 4
- France 5
- France Info
- Gulli
- Investigation Discovery France
- L'Équipe
- L'Esprit Sorcier TV
- LCI
- LCP AN Public Sénat
- M6
- M6 4K
- M6 Music
- MTV
- National Geographic France
- Nickelodeon France
- Nickelodeon +1
- Nickelodeon Junior France
- Nicktoons France
- Novo 19
- Paris Première
- RMC Découverte
- RMC Life
- RMC Story
- T18
- Téva
- TF1
- TF1 4K
- TF1 Séries Films
- TFX
- TiJi
- TLC France
- TMC
- TV5Monde
- W9
- Warner TV France
- Warner TV Next

== FAST Channels ==
=== TF1+ ===
- Alice Nevers : Le juge est une femme
- Baby Boom
- Balthazar
- Camping Paradis
- Cédric
- Chante !
- Comédie Fiction
- Cry Babies BFF
- Danse avec les stars
- Demain nous appartient
- Famille d'accueil
- Foudre
- Ici tout commence
- Je te promets
- Joséphine, ange gardien
- La Villa des cœurs brisés
- Le Destin de Lisa
- Les Bracelets rouges
- Les caméras cachées de François Damiens
- Les Enfoirés
- Les Mystères de l'amour
- Les Restaurants du Cœur
- Lolywood TV
- Mamans & célèbres
- Mask Singer France
- Mighty Express
- Naruto
- Nos chers voisins
- Palmashow TV
- Pas de secrets entre nou
- Plus belle la vie, encore plus belle
- Pyjamasques
- Secret Story
- Section de recherches
- Sous le soleil
- Star Academy France 2001-2008
- Super Nanny
- Ushuaïa TV For Change

=== france.tv ===
- france.tv Docs
- france.tv Séries
- france.tv Sport
- INA

=== Canal+/TV+ ===
- Clique TV
- Gym Direct
- Groland
- Comedy Club
- Les Deschiens
- Les Nouveaux Explorateurs
- Les interviews de Raphaël Mezrahi
- Les Animaux de la 8

=== M6+ ===
- Enquêtes criminelles 24/24
- Incroyables Transformations 24/24
- Le Live by M6+ 24/24
- Le Reines du Shopping 24/24
- Les Marseillais 24/24
- NFL 24/24
- Téléfilm 24/24
- Turbo 24/24
- Zone Interdite 24/24

=== SFR TV/RMC BFM Play ===
- BFM Grands Reportages
- RMC Alerte Secours
- RMC J'irai dormir chez vous
- RMC Mecanic
- RMC Mystère
- RMC Talk Info
- RMC Wow

=== L'Équipe ===
- L'Équipe Live 1
- L'Équipe Live 2

== Defunct channels ==
- Alegria
- AlloCiné TV
- Altice Studio
- Angers 7
- Aqui TV
- Bandiagara
- Boing
- Bravo
- C9 Télévision
- C'était Hier
- Canal 15
- Canal 28
- Canal Bis
- Canal Infos
- Cap 24
- Cash TV
- Célà TV
- CFoot
- Ciné Box
- Ciné First
- Ciné Folies
- Ciné Palace
- Ciné Pop
- CLP TV
- Contact TV
- Elle Girl TV
- Eurêka !
- Fit TV
- Foot School TV
- Fun TV
- Golf Channel France
- Gourmet TV
- HGTV
- Humour
- iC1
- IDF1
- JET
- KZTV
- La Chaîne du père Noël
- Ma planète
- Match TV
- Melody
- Musique classique
- Muzzik
- Nantes 7
- Nat Geo Music
- Non Stop People
- Normandie TV
- Nostalgie la télé
- NRJ Paris
- OM TV
- Orléans TV
- Stylia
- Campus Bac
- La Chaîne des Champions
- Planète Juniors
- Régions
- RFO Sat
- Romance
- RT France
- Salto
- Santé Vie
- Spectacle
- Télé Bleue
- Télé locale Provence
- Télé Toulouse
- Télé Sud Vendée
- Tempo
- Territorial TV
- TFJ
- Tfou TV
- TV10 Angers
- TV77
- TV Club
- Télé emploi
- Ultra Nature
- Villages tv
- Virgin Radio TV
- Voo TV
- Wishline
- 'Zik
- France Ô - defunct public station
- Canal+ Play
- Canal+ A la demande
- Direct 8 - defunct commercial station
- Direct Star - defunct commercial music station
- Antennes Locales
- Discovery Real Time France
- Discovery Family
- Equidia Live
- MCS Tennis
- Equidia Life
- Kombat Sport
- SFR Sport
- TV8 Mont-Blanc
- Voyage
- Téléfoot
- Renault TV
- OL TV
- Muzzik
- Motors TV
- Motorsport.tv
- Onzéo
- Sport365
- Encyclo
- Escales
- Foot+
- Rugby+
- MCM Pop
- MCM Africa
- MTV Pulse
- MTV Base
- MTV Idol
- MCM
- MyCuisine
- Planète+ Thalassa
- Best of Shopping
- Nolife
- Vivolta
- La Cinq - defunct commercial network
- La Sept - defunct cultural network (part-time)
- TV6, defunct commercial music station
- Virgin 17 - defunct commercial music station
- Europe 2 TV - defunct commercial music station
- June
- OCS Géants
- OCS Pulp
- OCS Max
- TPS Star
- TPS Cinéstar
- TPS Homecinéma
- TPS Cinéculte
- TPS Cinétoile
- TPS Cinextrême
- TPS Cinéfamily
- TPS Cinéclub
- TPS Cinécomedy
- TPS Foot
- Planète+ A&E
- Canal+ Décalé
- Canal+ Family
- Canal+ 3D
- Campagnes TV
- Planète+ CI
- Ma Chaîne Sport
- Campus
- Stingray Brava
- Girondins TV
- Penthouse HD
- MCS Bien Etre
- MCS Extreme
- M6 Boutique & Co
- M6 Boutique
- Liberty TV
- Frenchlover TV
- Sundance Channel
- MN+
- AB Moteurs
- AB4
- Ciné FX
- Ciné Polar
- Polar
- Nollywood TV
- Numéro 23
- M6 Music Club
- M6 Music Rock
- M6 Music Black
- Ciné+ Club
- Ciné+ Premier
- Ciné+ Star
- OCS Novo
- OCS Happy
- OCS Choc
- Clique TV
- OCS City
- QVC
- Cuisine+
- Libido TV
- Sport+
- TF6 - defunct commercial station
- Jimmy - defunct commercial station
- Maison+ - defunct lifestyle commercial station
- Discovery Science France
- Disney XD France
- Disney Cinema France
- RMC Sport 2
- RMC Sport 3
- RMC Sport 4
- RMC Sport News
- France 3 UHD
- france.tv Paris 2024
- france.tv Roland Garros
- Canal+ Formula 1
- Canal+ Ligue 1
- Canal+ Top 14
- Disney Channel +1 France
- Disney Jr. France
- National Geographic Wild France
- C8
- NRJ 12
- BFM Paris Île-de-France
- Nickelodeon Teen France
- Vià
- Canal+ Séries
- Club MTV
- BET
- Game One
- Game One +1
- J-One
- MTV Hits
- Paramount Network France
- Paramount Network Décalé
- Wéo Nord-Pas-de-Calais
- Wéo Picardie
- Game One Music 3D
- Game One Music HD
- Fox Life
- Terre d'Infos TV
- Télim TV
- TPMP
- La Chaîne de la fin du monde
- La Chaîne Disco
- La Latina TV
- Via Occitanie
- Télé Miroir
- MB Live TV
- Téléssonne
- Télé Alsace
- Olympia TV

== See also ==
- Television in France
- Television in Belgium
- Television in Luxembourg
