= AB Sat =

Digital television channel package

AB Sat is a package of digital terrestrial television channels (encrypted with Viaccess and Mediaguard) offered by the satellite companies Hot Bird and Astra and marketed in France, Belgium, Switzerland and Germany. The channels are all (or partly) run by the cable operators and certain networks ADSL. ABSAT has a stake on two digital terrestrial television channels (TMC and NT1). The company is chaired by Michele Cotta.

== History ==
The company AB Groupe was launched in 1995 as the second satellite package in France (after the launch of CanalSat in 1992), as part of the shift from analogue to digital television. The package creates some big names in media, such as Claude Berda (current president of AB), who hired Christian Dutoit (member of CSA, former head of TF1, the production of Antenne 2, founder of many channels such as La Cinq, LCI and I>Télévision), Ghislain Achard (former head of the France Télévisions group until 2005) and Marc Sillam (former big name in cinema). The society only had a small market share in satellite television compared to CanalSat a few months before the innovation of many points, such as:

- First digital broadcast by satellite on a French package in March 1995 (beating giant Canal+'s broadcast two months later)
- First and only satellite television package offering two choices simultaneously on satellite and cable. This made it possible to put in place digital receivers compatible with access controls (encryption) for all the French packages (AB Sat and CanalSat and/or TPS are available). In 1999, the AB group reviewed the policy, and officially abandoned the sale of these decoders in France. This was reviewed again in 2003, notably with a receiver with an installation disc which permitted the registration functions.
- "Best price" offers for a contract offering one-fifth of the channels (from 49 francs / 7.5 Euros per month) in 1996.
- Launch of 18 digital channels in three months (technical process launched and equipped under technical director Jean-Marc Fonseca).
- Creation of the first themed channels : "life", "animals", "manga", "motors", "FIT TV", etc.
- First encrypted channel reserved for adults to be approved by the CSA (XXL).
- Launch of digital satellite "zapper box" for a very low price in 1996: less than 2 000 francs (around 300 euros).
- In 1999, an agreement was reached allowing the incorporation of AB channels into packages from other companies and allowing the customer to pay for more channels to be incorporated into the basic package, an option still available today.
- Launch in May 2005 of prepaid cards allowing access to contract channels for a period of three to six months (not available with the rental of TPS decoders, but available for other companies).
- In June 2006, AB Sat had 30000 contracts direct to satellite.
- September 2007: the group looks at allowing all satellite customers access to digital terrestrial television channels via Hot Bird and Atlantic Bird 3 satellites.
- On 22 September 2007 a decision was reached obliging the AB SAT package to provide the public service channels France 2, France 3, France 4 and France 5 as well as Arte, LCP and TV5 Monde. On 24 October 2007, the channels France3 sat, France4, France5, France O and LCP arrived in the Absat package. At the end of November TF1 also arrived.
- Since December 2007, Absat have offered the Bis Télévisions package, allowing all terrestrial channels in the ABSat package in their basic offer. The price is 4.90 Euros per month, without the Cinérama and Night options at an extra 4.90 Euros.

== Satellite package ==
Bis Télévisions FRANCE :

- TF1
- France 2
- France 3
- NT1
- France 5
- M6
- ARTE
- Direct 8
- W9
- TMC
- RTL9
- NRJ 12
- LCP-AN/Public Sénat
- France 4
- BFM TV
- Mangas
- Virgin 17
- Gulli
- AB1
- AB moteurs
- Orange Sports Info
- Vidéoclick
- Escales
- Animaux
- Encyclopedia
- Canal Hollywood
- Toute l'Histoire
- Chasse et Pêche
- TV8 Mont-Blanc
- France Ô
- TV5 MONDE
- Action
- Ciné First
- Ciné Fx
- Ciné Polar
- XXL
- Dorcel TV
- ART Prime Sport
- ART Hikayat (séries)
- ART Movies (cinéma)

AB Sat Belgique :

AB3, AB4, AB1, RTL9, TMC, NT1, MANGAS, ANIMAUX, AB MOTEURS, XXL (22h30/05h), ESCALES, ENCYCLOPEDIA, FIT-TV, TOUTE L'HISTOIRE, DORCEL TV (24/24h), CINE FX, CINE FIRST, CINE POP, CINE POLAR, ACTION and CHASSE ET PECHE

ABSat Europe et Moyen-Orient :

AB1, RTL9, TMC, NT1, MANGAS, ANIMAUX, AB MOTEURS, XXL (22h30/05h), ESCALES, ENCYCLOPEDIA, FIT-TV, TOUTE L'HISTOIRE, DORCEL TV (24/24h), CINE FX, CINE FIRST, CINE POP, CINE POLAR, ACTION and CHASSE ET PECHE

== Channels ==
=== General ===
For a long time, the increase in general channels has not translated to a similar acquisition of programmes, with the arrival of the command of Michèle Cotta in the board of AB Sat (In May 2006, Michèle Cotta rejoined the JLA group, the A in AB) and of the digitalisation of programmes which allowed the growth of the portfolio in programmes, the channels have operated a little with a level of coherence and the presence of the same series, films, and telefilms on all three channels.

- AB1
- NT1
- RTL9, acquired 65% in 1998
- TMC Monte Carlo, acquired 40% in 2004 (40% owned by TF1)
- AB3 for contracts in Belgium
- AB4 For contracts in Belgium

=== Cinema ===
The AB Sat package is the first package to theme their cinema channels, an idea copied today by all other French packages. The original five channels offered were : Action, Crime, Cinema Palace, Life and Romance. Action didn't survive, and was replaced by the option of Passions on TPS in 1999, the other channels were also reformatted. In September 2002, AB Sat launched the Ciné Box package with Ciné FX, Ciné Polar, Ciné Comic and Ciné Box. The package was not successful, and two channels disappeared in 2004 : Ciné Comic and Ciné Box. The two other channels, Ciné FX and Ciné Polar were taken in by the cinema package of Canalsat and TPS. The most part of the cinema channels was shared equally on cable in France and Belgium.

- Action
- Ciné Fx (the only French channel 100% dedicated to science-fiction, fantasy and horror)
- Ciné Polar

=== Sport ===
- AB moteurs
- Orange sport Info

=== Documentaries and true-life ===
- Encyclopédia
- Toutel'Histoire
- Animaux
- Escales
- Chasse et Pêche

=== Specialised ===
- Mangas
- XXL (channel reserved for pornography and other pay channels)
- Fit TV (fitness)
- Vidéoclick (Themed)
- Télé Marseille (Local channel that Absat launched)

== Former channels ==
=== Music ===
- Musique classique (television channel) (Cancelled in 2007)
- Nostalgie TV, later RFM TV (Cancelled in April 2005)
- Onyx (German channel) became documentary channel : Terra Nova (since cancelled)
- 'Zik (Cancelled 31 December 2007)

=== Sport ===
- AB Sports, bought from the Pathé group in 1998 (Pathé sport) and since become Sport+
- France Courses (daily live racing)

=== Cinema ===
- Hollywood Stars
- Ciné Box (Cinema channel cancelled end of August 2004)
- Ciné Comic (Cinema channel cancelled end of August 2004)
- Ciné Palace
- Canal Hollywood
- Rire
- Romance

=== Others ===
- Terranova (documentary)
- Vive la vie TV (now Fit TV, now closed in 2003)
- AB5
