= AB1 =

French television channel

- Country: France
- Broadcast area: France; Switzerland; Belgium; Luxembourg; Monaco; Morocco; Algeria; Tunisia; Lebanon; Madagascar; Mauritius; Overseas France; Haiti
- Headquarters: La Plaine Saint-Denis, France

Programming
- Language: French
- Picture format: 1080i (HDTV); 576i (16:9 SDTV)

Ownership
- Owner: Mediawan Thematics
- Sister channels: RTL9, Mangas, Action, Automoto La chaîne, Animaux, Science et Vie TV, Toute l'Histoire, Trek, Chasse et Pêche, Ultra Nature, Crime District, Golf Channel, Lucky Jack.tv, XXL

History
- Launched: 1 December 1995; 30 years ago
- Former names: AB Channel 1 (1995-1997)

Links
- Website: www.ab1.tv

AB1 (formally AB Channel 1 until 1995) is a French television channel aimed at young adults.

== History ==
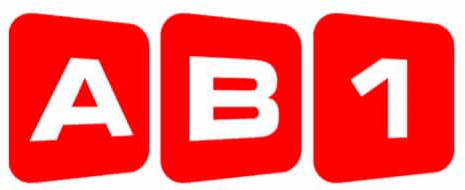
Former logo used before 2024

AB1 launched on Eutelsat's Hot Bird satellite and on cable on December 1, 1995, as AB Channel 1 nearly a year before the launch of the AB Sat digital satellite package as that package's premium mini-generalist channel. The first line-up is made up of sitcoms, series and anime from Club Dorothée, of which AB Groupe is a producer. In 1997, the word Channel disappears and the channel takes its current name AB1, including a change of look.

In its early days, the channel broadcast American series (new to France) in their original version such as Caroline in the City and Malcolm & Eddie. Among the channel's innovations, it offered a window for African-American sitcoms such as Malcolm & Eddie or the Steve Harvey Show and aired certain seasons of the American talk show, The Jerry Springer Show.

In 2000, the channel set up new French programs produced by AB Productions and leaving less room for American productions: T.R.I.K (Trash Ridicule Insolite et Kitsh", Sex Party and Décibels made their appearance, anime also took a more important part and a movie was shown once a week. This slightly more French programming did not appeal to the public and AB1 therefore returned in 2002 to its basics, series, sitcoms and anime.

In July 2002, AB1 was given a new look, as that of the Belgian channel AB3. The sitcom and series programmes returned in force in a format intended for 15- to 34-year-olds.

In May 2006, the channel achieved its best audience since its creation by programming a special evening devoted to Club Dorothée.

In October 2008, the AB group withdrew from subscription DTT, stopping the broadcast of its channel AB1. The reason given is "the lack of visibility" of subscription DTT. The freed frequency had been reassigned to France Ô so that it can be broadcast over the whole of France.

On 27 August 2010, the channel began broadcasting WWE SmackDown on Friday night to complement the WWE Raw broadcast on RTL9, thus giving the premiere of these programs to subscribers of both channels before their broadcast on NT1, previously belonging to the AB Groupe and free-to-air. In March 2013, AB1 obtained the broadcast rights for all 2013 pay-per-view live, including WrestleMania 29 on 7 April. The channel also announced that it will broadcast the WWE Main Event from 5 April 2013, at 20:45. On 6 April 2014 WrestleMania XXX took place in New Orleans, and to celebrate the event Phillipe Chereau and Christophe Agius had their own tables of commentator alongside American and Spanish commentators from the WWE.

AB1 went into high definition at the beginning of July 2014.

On 16 May 2013, the channel had broadcast a new documentary titled La fabuleuse histoire de Dorothée.

On 31 December 2013, the channel had broadcast the event program Et ça vous Amuse? previously broadcast on RTL9, with Gérald Dahan as its presenter.

On 14 February 2014, humorist Daniela Martins and wrestler Sébastien Loew presented My First Great Love, on Valentine's Day.

For the 2014/2015 season, the channel offered new series as well as new episodes. It also featured feature films and reality TV shows.

In 2022, AB1 announces the launch of its first original production, Capucine, in September 2022.

== Programming ==
=== Imported shows ===
- American Dreams
- Arrow
- Dawson's Creek
- Diagnosis: Murder
- CSI: NY
- Family Matters
- Home and Away
- Stargate SG-1
- Supernatural

=== WWE Wrestling ===
- WWE Elimination Chamber
- WWE Extreme Rules
- WWE Hell in a Cell
- WWE Main Event
- WWE Money in the Bank
- WWE Night of Champions
- WWE Over the Limit
- WWE Payback
- WWE Royal Rumble
- WWE Smackdown
- WWE SummerSlam
- WWE Survivor Series
- WWE TLC: Tables, Ladders & Chairs
- WWE WrestleMania
