= Tango (telecom) =

Luxembourgish telecom company

- Company type: S.A._(corporation)
- Industry: Telecommunications
- Founded: May 1998; 28 years ago
- Headquarters: Bertrange, Luxembourg
- Number of locations: 9 Tango points of sale, 17 partners points of sale
- Area served: Luxembourg
- Services: Fixed line and mobile telephony Internet services Digital television
- Revenue: €127 million (end 2013)
- Number of employees: 112 (March 2018)
- Parent: Proximus Group
- Website: www.tango.lu

Tango SA is a Luxembourgish telecom company that offers TV, Internet, fixed and mobile telephony services to residential customers, the self-employed and small businesses.

As of January 2018, Tango counted around 280,000 customers mainly located in Luxembourg, Belgium, France, Germany. The company has 9 outlet stores and 17 partner outlets. Tango has a partnership with Vodafone.

Tele2 sold Tango to Proximus Group in 2008, which also owns Telindus, another telecom company in Luxembourg, and both companies were brought together under one structure in October 2016.

== Competitors ==
Tango is the second largest of Luxembourg's three main mobile telecommunications operators. It competes with Orange Luxembourg (formerly VOX mobile) and POST Luxembourg.

== Tango TV ==
Tango TV propose 4 formulas: S, Luso, L and XL, and thematic TV bouquets. Tango provide a similar French-language channels line-up with its Belgian counterpart Proximus Pickx.

=== S ===
It is the basic offer, which include essential channels with Cartoon Network and Disney premium channels.

- Al Jazeera
- ARD HD
- Baby TV
- BBC Entertainment
- Bloomberg
- C8 HD
- Cartoon Network
- Chamber TV
- CNBC Europe HD
- CNews
- CStar HD
- Disney Channel (DE)
- Disney Channel (FR) HD
- Disney Junior (DE) HD
- Disney Junior (FR)
- Euronews
- FashionTV
- Fix & Foxi
- Fox (DE) HD
- France 2 HD
- KTO
- La Une HD
- Lëtz Kanal
- M6 HD
- Mediaset Italia
- Melody
- National Geographic HD
- National Geographic Wild
- National Geographic (DE) HD
- ProSieben HD
- Record TV HD
- RFM TV
- RTL Nitro
- RTL HD
- RTL Télé Lëtzebuerg HD
- RTL Zwee HD
- RTL Zwei HD
- RTPi
- Sat.1 HD
- Sat.1 Gold HD
- Studio 100 TV HD
- Super RTL HD
- TF1 HD
- TVE Internacional HD
- TVI Internacional
- ZDF HD

=== L ===
S channels +:

- 3sat HD
- AB3 HD
- ABXplore
- Action HD
- Arte HD
- BBC World News
- Bibel TV
- BR Fernsehen
- ARD-alpha
- Canal 24h HD
- Club RTL HD
- CNN HD
- Deutsche Welle
- DMAX
- Eurosport 1
- France 24 (EN)
- France 24 (FR) HD
- France 3 HD
- France 4 HD
- France 5 HD
- Histoire TV
- Hr-fernsehen
- Kabel eins HD
- KiKa
- La Trois HD
- LCI HD
- MDR Fernsehen
- Mezzo Live HD
- MTV Europe
- N-tv
- NDR Fernsehen
- One
- Phoenix
- Plug RTL HD
- ProSieben Maxx HD
- Radio Bremen TV
- Rai 1
- Rai 2
- Rai 3
- Rai News24
- Rai Scuola
- Rai Storia
- RBB Fernsehen
- RTL 4
- RTL 5
- RTL 7
- RTL 8
- Sixx HD
- SR Fernsehen
- SWR Fernsehen
- Tagesschau24
- Tele 5
- Tipik HD
- TMC HD
- Trek HD
- TV Breizh HD
- TV5Monde HD
- Ushuaïa TV HD
- VOX HD
- VOXup
- W9 HD
- WDR Fernsehen
- Welt HD
- ZDFinfo
- ZDFneo

=== Luso ===
The Luso formula propose the S channels plus the bouquets Foot (Eleven Sports and Proximus Sports channels) and Portugal.

=== XL ===
It propose all L channels and one extra: one bouquet or 2 VoDs per month.

=== Bouquet Foot ===
- Eleven Sports HD
- Eleven Pro League HD
- Proximus Sports HD

=== Bouquet Family ===
- 13ème Rue
- Boomerang
- Canal J
- E!
- Gulli HD
- Mangas
- Syfy HD
- TCM Cinéma
- TiJi

=== Bouquet Portugal ===
- Benfica TV HD
- Eurosport 1 (PT)
- Globo Internacional HD
- Porto Canal
- RTP3
- SIC Internacional
- SIC Notícias
- Sporting TV
- TVI Ficção

=== Bouquet Sport & Discovery ===
- Animaux
- Automoto
- Discovery HD
- Eurosport 1 (FR) HD
- Eurosport 1 (PT) HD
- Eurosport 2 (FR) HD
- Eurosport 2 (PT)
- Eurosport News
- Extreme Sports
- National Geographic Wild HD
- National Geographic HD

=== Bouquet Charme ===
- Dorcel XXX
- Passie XXX
- Penthouse HD
- Pink X
