= Eutelsat 5 West A =

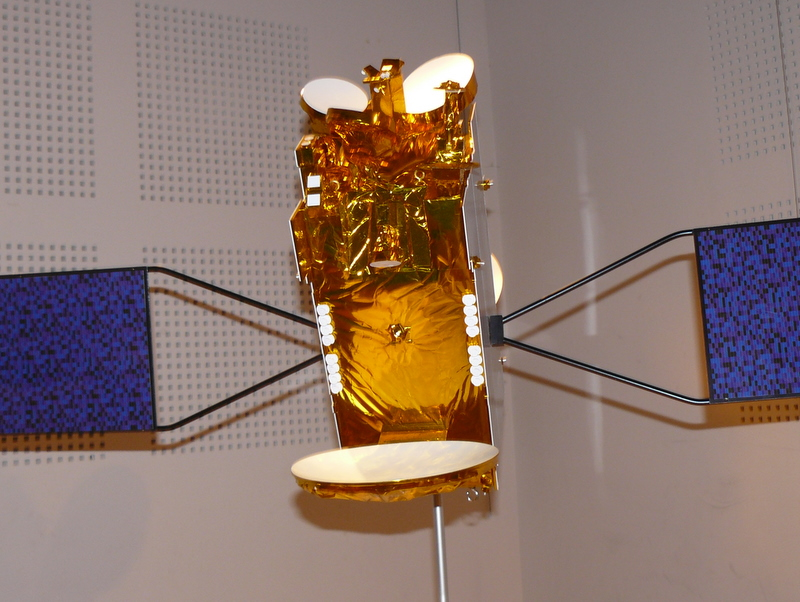
- Atlantic Bird 3 satellite
- Names: Atlantic Bird 3 AB 3 Stellat 5
- Mission type: Communications
- Operator: Eutelsat
- COSPAR ID: 2002-035A
- SATCAT no.: 27460
- Website: https://www.eutelsat.com/en/home.html
- Mission duration: 15 years (planned); 20 years (achieved)

Spacecraft properties
- Spacecraft: Stellat 5 / Atlantic Bird 3
- Spacecraft type: Spacebus
- Bus: Spacebus 3000 B3
- Manufacturer: Alcatel Space
- Launch mass: 4,050 kg (8,930 lb)
- Dry mass: 1,805 kg (3,979 lb)
- Dimensions: 5.47 m x 3.45 m x 2.44 m
- Power: 11 kW

Start of mission
- Launch date: 5 July 2002, 23:22:00 UTC
- Rocket: Ariane 5G (V153)
- Launch site: Centre Spatial Guyanais, ELA-3
- Contractor: Arianespace
- Entered service: September 2002

End of mission
- Disposal: Graveyard orbit
- Deactivated: January 2023
- Last contact: 9:57 Jan. 13 2023 (UTC)

Orbital parameters
- Reference system: Geocentric orbit
- Regime: Geostationary orbit
- Longitude: 5° West

Transponders
- Band: 45 transponders: 10 C-band; 35 Ku-band
- Coverage area: Europe, Africa, Middle East

Eutelsat 5 West A, formerly Atlantic Bird 3 (or AB 3) was a communications satellite belonging to the operator Eutelsat. Situated at 5° West, it broadcast satellite television, radio and other digital data. Developed for France Telecom it was transferred soon after its launch to the operator Eutelsat. It entered operational service in early September 2002. Its anticipated working life was 15 years. It was decommissioned in January 2023.

== History ==
Stellat 5, as it was originally known, was built by Alcatel Space on behalf of Stellat, a joint-venture between France Telecom (70%) and Europe*Star (30%), a subsidiary of Alcatel Space and Loral Space & Communications. It was launched on 5 July 2002 at 23:22:00 UTC by an Ariane 5G launch vehicle from Centre Spatial Guyanais, Kourou in French Guiana along with the Japanese satellite N-STAR c. It had a launch weight of 4050 kg. Victim of financial difficulties, France Telecom withdrew from space operations. In this move it sold Stellat to Eutelsat in July 2002, after the launch. Early September 2002, the satellite entered operational service. On 25 September 2002, Eutelsat completed the acquisition for a sum of €183,900,000 and renamed the satellite Atlantic Bird 3.

Atlantic Bird 3 took on the role covered by the satellites Telecom 1 and Telecom 2C, operational between 1983 and 2002, in the historic French position of 5° of longitude West. In March 2012, EUTELSAT re-baptised its satellite fleet, and Atlantic Bird 3 was renamed Eutelsat 5 West A.

== Technical characteristics ==
Atlantic Bird 3 was assembled by Alcatel Space, later Alcatel Alenia Space, on a Spacebus-3000B3 satellite bus. It was equipped with 35 Ku-band repeaters covering Europe, North Africa and the Middle East as well as 10 C-band repeaters. The Ku-band repeaters were 94 watts. The 10 C-band repeaters were 55 watts. During the eclipse of 19 April 2004 equinox, the satellite lost 6 of its total of 108 battery elements, reducing its performance.

== Transmissions ==
=== French public analogue ===
Atlantic Bird 3 was launched to replace satellite Telecom 2C. It, therefore, took on the mission to continue the transmission of French national analog television channels to:

- Feed terrestrial transmitters of TDF (Télévision de France).
- Reach receivers in zones not covered by the terrestrial transmission network.

In France, Atlantic Bird 3 enabled Eutelsat to serve 1.6 million households (of nearly 23 million with televisions) who otherwise did not receive a signal at all, or who received a poor or unreliable signal ("snow", echos, interference, fog, repeated storm damage of mountain transmitters). No other free alternative existed. Transmissions were made in SÉCAM, the standard used in France.

Reception of analog satellite television could be achieved with relatively basic equipment:

- 80 cm (31 in) monoblock satellite dish.
- Analogue demodulator with vertical polarisation, 22 kHz.

Terrestrial analogue transmissions ceased in France on 29 November 2011 and the analogue satellite service reduced accordingly thereafter.

=== French public digital ===
With the arrival of digital terrestrial television in France, notably 18 or 19 free national channels attributed by the Conseil supérieur de l'audiovisuel (CSA), this satellite was chosen to feed terrestrial transmitters from March 2005. Householders could also use AB 3 to receive French digital TV: Télévision Numérique Terrestre (TNT):

- The majority of public French channels (France 2, France 3 via the signal "France 3 Sat", France 5, La Chaîne parlementaire) can be received with any DVB-S compatible receiver that has a Fransat card.
- Regional programmes of France 3, access to Arte and France 4 are only available within the bouquet of Fransat with a specific Fransat demodulator or otherwise within subscription bouquets of Bis or Orange.
- Numerous local channels have chosen this satellite for free transmission of their programmes: téléGrenoble Isère, Mirabelle TV, TV8 Mont Blanc, Télé Locale Provence (TLP), Normandie TV, Vosges Télévision and NRJ Paris Sat.
- Some private French channels also transmit freely: Télé Monte Carlo (TMC), BFM Business, KTO, Dieu TV, Demain TV as well as the channel TV5Monde (under the French Belgian Swiss version).
- National digital TV channels are also distributed using a Newtec proprietary encapsulation encoding, which is only receivable with a terminal having the related demultiplexing function.

Hybrid analog / digital demodulators have permitted continued access to free-to-air national channels during the transition. Since the end of 2011 and the termination of analogue broadcasting on Atlantic Bird 3, now requires a subscription to one of the two packages present on the satellite or a Fransat labelled terminal.

The various packages offering bouquets of digital channels are:

- Bis Télévisions initiated by AB Sat group
- Orange télévision
- Fransat (Free-to-view)

The terminals compatible with these bouquets employ MPEG-2 or MPEG-4 (thus backwards compatible with 2) for encrypted broadcasts.

==== Regulatory obligations for the FRANSAT bouquet ====
In the 2007 bill "The future of television", French senators voted for an article requiring national digital TV broadcasters to make their free-to-air channels available to viewers via at least one satellite distributor or channel editor within a maximum period of three months from the date of enactment of the law confirmed by the vote of Deputies. This law passed through a fixed joint commission of 2 chambers, because the text was amended and adopted permanently. The Socialist Party (France) (PS) group that had challenged before the Constitutional Council was dismissed on 28 February 2008.

In a report published by the Secretariat of State for Strategic Studies, it was planned to create a 2nd free satellite offer to over 1.5 million households already facing Atlantic Bird 3 without redirecting their existing satellite dish, in addition to the TNTSAT offer managed by the Canal+ Group. Announced on 8 February 2009 by EUTELSAT, this offer designated FRANSAT joined AB 3 in June 2009.

==== Chronology ====
- 2 March 2005: start of French terrestrial digital TV "TNT" transmissions.
- 10 May 2007: TNT group abandoned the management of a project for a TNT satellite bouquet.
- 13 September 2007: reorganisation of multiplexes, France 4 left GR1 and was therefore no longer directly accessible.
- 20 September 2007: initiation of a bouquet under the auspices of AB Group with Eutelsat.
- 25 September 2007: logo appears for the Bis bouquet managed by AB SAT.
- 1 December 2007: the arrival of TNT Algeria channels (Établissement public de télévision (ENTV), Canal Algérie, Algérie 3) on the (adjustable) beam centered on the Maghreb.
- 2 December 2007: CNES TV is seen on AB 3.
- 5 December 2007: official announcement of the arrival of Bis Television on AB 3.
- 18 December 2007: start of the broadcast bouquet Bis Télévisions.
- 28 December 2007: Fox Life is observed on AB 3 and then from mid-April 2008, encrypted in BISS.
- 11 April 2008: Orange (France Telecom) announced the selection of AB 3 for the dissemination of its bouquet.
- 9 September 2008: TMC stopped running unencrypted in DVB-S (SCPC).
- 13 November 2008: Orange TV offer available.
- 7 April 2009: Eutelsat announces the imminent commissioning of free FRANSAT bouquet.
- 23 June 2009: launch of the Fransat bouquet of FTA channels TNT, including HD and France Ô.
- 21 July 2009: restructure of the composition of transponders, pooling Fransat, Bis TV and Orange TV.
- 28 October 2009: addition of 24 digital regional broadcasts of France 3 in Fransat.
- 8 June 2010: the frequency change of Arte on TNT causes the disappearance of digital Arte clear in favour of France Ô.
- 1 August 2011: the arrival of an encrypted bouquet of 3 Berber channels: Berber Youth, Berber Music, Berber Television.
- 29 November 2011: start of termination of analogue broadcasting operational since mid-1980.
- 1 March 2012: new name for AB 3: Eutelsat 5 West A.
- 30 May 2012: diffusion bouquet Bein Sport 1 HD and SD (BeIN Sport 2 during August).
- 12 December 2012: HD broadcast of the latest 6 new channels (HD1, L'Équipe 21, 6ter, Numéro 23, RMC Découverte and Chérie 25).
- 19 May 2015: addition of TMC HD, NT1 and NRJ 12 HD.
- 9 September 2015: Addition of France 4 HD and France 5 HD.

=== Free to air channels on Eutelsat 5 West A ===
KC 110.971 GHz V 29950 7/8
- TV5Monde France Belgique Suisse
- Fransat Info HD

KB4 11.609 GHz V 5969 1/2
- BiS Télévisions Promo

KB1 11.471 GHz V 29950 3/4
- D!CI TV (Alpes-de-Haute-Provence)
KB11 11.634 GHz H 29950 3/4
- Fransat Ultra HD Démo
KC3 11.054 GHz V 29950 7/8
- beIN Sports Actu
KB2 11.512 GHz V 29950 7/8
- BFM Business

KC9 11.059 GHz H 23700 3/4
- Algérie 3
- Canal Algérie
- TV Coran (Algérie)
- TV Tamazight (Algérie)
KB3 11.555 GHz V 29950 7/8
- TMC

KC4 11.096 GHz V 29950 3/4
- beIN Sports Actu HD
KB4 11.591 GHz V 20000 2/3
- France 2
- France 2 HD
- France 3 Toutes Régions
- France 3 HD
- France 5
- France Ô
- France Ô HD
- France 4 HD
- La Chaîne Parlementaire
KA2 12.564 GHz V 29950 7/8
- Astro Center TV
- Vosges Télévision
- KTO
- 8 Mont-Blanc
- Berbère Télévision
- Berbère Jeunesse
- Berbère Music
