= Vidéoclick =

- Country: Belgium
- Headquarters: Chaussée d'Ixelles 227b 1050 Brussels; Tél: (32) (0)2/650.09.20 Fax: (32) (0)2/646.07.12

Programming
- Language(s): French
- Picture format: 576i (4:3 SDTV)

History
- Launched: 3 April 2007; 17 years ago
- Closed: 29 July 2009; 15 years ago
- Former names: AB5 (2005-2006) La Quatre (2006-20 April 2007)

Links
- Website: www.videoclick.com

Vidéoclick was a commercial television channel shown in the French Community of Belgium.

== History of the channel ==
The Youth Channel Television group, which operates the Belgian channels AB3 and AB4, entered negotiations in 2004 with the communications agency (CSA) of the French Community of Belgium to obtain a new broadcasting licence. Named AB5, the projected new channel presented the agency with the chance to become the Belgian version of AB1, with a target market of 15/25 years old and showing a mix of anime and music. AB Groupe, which controlled YTV, proposed other channels for the TVI SA group to rival the RTL Group in Belgium: AB3, a general channel to rival RTL-TVI, AB4, a grown-up channel to rival Club RTL and AB5, the youth channel in competition with Plug TV.

Although Claude Berda, head of AB Groupe, was still in conflict with the Audiovisual Council (CSA) over his non-cooperation with certain regulations with AB3 in 2001 and 2002, the members of the CSA awarded a 9-year licence to AB5 on 18 February 2005. The launch of the channel took place without any agreement being reached with a cable broadcaster. The broadcast tests took place over Idéatel (around Mons) with the channel opening by showing pop videos for a few days, on Igeho (Hainaut Occidental) and channel 72, with the channel showing a black screen for a few days, and on Coditel from February 2005 to August 2006.

In September 2006, the channel was officially launched under the name La Quatre and radically changed from the ideas underlying AB4 at its creation, so that it became a channel showing cult series from the 60s, 70s and 80s, and also classic films. The change of name allowed AB Groupe to re-use programmes originally shown in 2005 on NT1 via digital television in France on the new "La Quatre". It also allowed the channel to place itself directly after the three main channels of the RTBF, as the fourth francophone Belgian channel, in place of RTL-TVI, which returned to Luxembourg in 2005.

Failing to find an audience, and very similar to AB4, AB Groupe decided to stop showing "La Quatre" on 3 April 2007.

On 3 April 2007, Vidéoclick took over from La Quatre (formerly AB5) and became a channel based around a website.

== Organisation ==
=== Managers ===
Président :

- Rolland Berda

=== Capital ===
Vidéoclick is owned 100% by BTV SA (formerly YTV), financed 49% by AB Groupe, and Ipercast SA.

== Programmes ==
Formerly, La Quatre showed similar programs to AB4, such as TV series and old films. There was no call-TV and no teleshopping. When call-TV and teleshopping was shown on AB4, La Quatre showed old series.

To start with, the programs shown on AB4 (including call-TV and teleshopping) were shown at the same time on La Quatre. Sometimes La Quatre showed the same programmes but delayed by a few days. La Quatre started showing pop videos in March 2007 until midday, and repeated these programmes in the evening.

Currently, Vidéoclick shows short advertising films, humorous videos, short clips, films, which are also available on the channel's website. People who visit the website of the channel can vote for the videos which they wish to be shown on the Vidéoclick channel.

Vidéoclick has changed broadcast since July 2008.

== Broadcast ==
La Quatre was shown on Coditel cable in the Brussels region and on Ideatel (Mons and Centre). The channel was also shown on the Select package of Belgacom TV since mid-March 2007.

Since April 2007, Vidéoclick is available via AB Sat and on the channel's website.

== See also ==
- AB4
- AB Groupe
- NT1 (television)
