= Ciné Box =

- Country: France
- Broadcast area: France

Programming
- Language: French
- Picture format: 576i (4:3 SDTV)

Ownership
- Owner: AB Groupe

History
- Launched: September 2002; 23 years ago
- Replaced: Ciné Palace
- Closed: 24 August 2004; 21 years ago
- Replaced by: Ciné First

Ciné Box, broadcast from September 2002 to 24 August 2004, is a former French television channel of AB Groupe devoted to cinema.

== History ==
In 2002, a project for the revision of the cinema channels of AB Groupe was envisaged. The bouquet was to be called Cinétem and had to be composed of 6 channels: Ciné Art, Ciné Box (replacing Ciné Palace), Ciné Comic (replacing Rire), Ciné FX, Ciné Passion (replacing Romance) and Ciné Polar (replacing Polar).

Finally, in September 2002, the new cinema bouquet was born and named Cinébox. It consisted of 4 channels: Ciné Comic, Ciné Polar, Ciné FX and Ciné Box. The last one is the portal chain of the cinema bouquet. Following the redesign of the cinema bouquet of CanalSatellite, named CinéCinéma, Ciné Art and Ciné Passion were not retained, judged too close to CinéCinéma Auteur and CinéCinéma Émotion.

Ciné Box was canceled on August 24, 2004 at the same time as Ciné Comic to release the transponder rented by AB Groupe to welcome Télé Monte Carlo, which was recently bought from the Pathé group on the AB Sat bouquet.
