= Escales (TV channel) =

- Country: France
- Broadcast area: France
- Headquarters: La Plaine Saint-Denis, France

Programming
- Language(s): French
- Picture format: 576i (16:9 SDTV)

Ownership
- Owner: AB Groupe

History
- Launched: 2 April 1996; 28 years ago
- Closed: 2 February 2015; 10 years ago
- Replaced by: Trek

Links
- Website: www.escalestv.fr

Escales was a French television channel in the travelogue and world discovery genre. Currently, the TV station is owned by AB Sat SA and has a budget of 24 million euros, 100% from AB Groupe.

== History of the channel ==
The TV station was launched in 1996 with the launch of the AB Sat satellite package as a documentary channel based on travel, in competition with the CanalSatellite channel, Voyage. To begin with, it was called Evasions.

Since October 2007, the channel has changed ownership, joining with its defunct German cousin Terranova which ceased broadcast in July 2007, and which also showed documentary programmes. Escales took over the broadcast of many its programmes and is still in competition with Voyage.

The channel was renamed Trek on February 2, 2015.

=== Budget ===
Escales is owned by AB Sat SA and has a budget of €24 million, 100% from AB Groupe.

== Programmes ==
It is a channel based on travel and tourism. Its programming looks at tourist destinations and travel.

The channel shows, in a series of documentaries, a country, a region of France, Europe or the world, to give a tourist guide of picturesque sites for visitors, places, or unusual activities.

== Broadcasting ==
Escales was broadcast originally only on AB Sat, but was then available through a subscription to all French and Swiss cable networks, on the Bis Télévisions, Orange, TéléSAT and CanalSat packages as well as on the main ADSL bouquets.
