= The Walt Disney Company France =

French division of The Walt Disney Company

- Formerly: Walt Disney Mickey Mouse, S.A. (1963); Walt Disney Productions France (1963-1987)
- Type: Subsidiary
- Traded as: Disney France
- Industry: Media conglomerate
- Founded: 1951; 75 years ago
- Headquarters: Paris, France
- Area served: France
- Key people: Hélène Etzi (Country Manager and Head of Media)
- Parent: The Walt Disney Company EMEA
- Divisions: The Walt Disney Studios France
- Website: disney.fr corporate.disney.fr (corporate)

The Walt Disney Company France (French: La Société Walt Disney), formerly Walt Disney Mickey Mouse, S.A. and Walt Disney Productions France, is one of The Walt Disney Company's international divisions and also European divisions. It is headquartered in Paris, Île-de-France.

The Walt Disney Company France is in charge of all Disney's brands and productions in France. The company also owns and operates French versions of Disney television channels and the Disneynature film unit. The Walt Disney Company France also co-produces content with other French media companies.

== History ==
=== Gaumont Buena Vista International ===
Gaumont and Buena Vista International formed Gaumont Buena Vista International, their joint venture French distribution company, in 1992. In March 1997, Disney would launch Disney Channel in France, also serving Luxembourg and Switzerland.

After the July 2001 purchase of Fox Family Worldwide, Disney also got a major ownership interest in Fox Kids Europe, which included Fox Kids in France. Fox Kids switched over to Jetix in August 2004.

Toon Disney, Disney Channel +1, a timeshift channel, and a Playhouse Disney channel launched in 2002. As of 30 June 2004, BVPD and Gaumont dissolved their French distribution joint venture, Gaumont Buena Vista International.

=== Buena Vista International France ===
On September 4, 2007, Disney Cinemagic replaced Toon Disney.

On November 30, 2008, at 8:30 PM, Disney Cinemagic HD debuted in France broadcasting on CANALSAT from 6am to 1am daily, making the channel the first "children and family HDTV channel in a French market".

Jean-Francois Camilleri, head of the company, had the company acquire March of the Penguins for the French market. Buena Vista International France also managed to obtain a 20% ownership stake in the French version of the film. However, Buena Vista Pictures Distribution's bid to distribute the film in the US ultimately failed. At the formation of the Disneynature film unit, Camilleri was placed in charge of the unit.

=== Walt Disney Company France ===
In 2011, Disney Channel HD was launched and the channel became available on all ISP in basic offers on 1 April, and Disney Junior replaced Playhouse Disney. Disney Cinemagic in France was replaced by Disney Cinema in May 2015. In 2012, a Disneynature cable TV service was launched in France. It was carried by Orange.

As part of the renewal of Disney contract with Canalsat, its exclusive channels Disney Junior, Disney XD and Disney Cinema were removed of Numericable on 31 December 2015, as it no longer had an exclusivity exemption for its cable network following its purchase of SFR where it has put its channels on fiber-optic offers.

On 26 August 2016, France Télévisions signed a 3-year contract with Disney France to broadcast Disney series for young people on France 3 and France 5, a contract previously held since 2010 by M6 for its block Disney Kid Club (excluding any Marvel shows which used to be on France 4). It wasn't renewed and most Disney shows no longer air on French DTT.

Camilleri resigned his position with Disney France in March 2019. While Helene Etzi was appointed to take over his responsibility as head of Disney's French operations, there was no word on who would helm Disneynature.

In 2019, Canal+ and Disney renewed their partnership for 5 years to launch together Disney+ in France. It included the renewal of channels and services in exclusivity, but with the arrival of Disney+, the channels Disney XD, Disney Cinema, and the services Disney Channel Pop Pick, Disney in English, Holà Disney and Fox Play were closed, while Disney Channel became back exclusive to Canal+. Canal+ was initially the unique distributor of Disney+ outside OTT.

In 2024, the Canal+ and Disney groups didn't find a reagreement with the rise of the importance of streaming against traditional television, involving the termination of its channels and services with Canal+ on 31 December 2024, while Canal+ is celebrating its 40th anniversary which is set to lose the initial broadcast of Disney movies on television.

On 20 December 2024, new deals were announced with Orange and Free for the return of Disney Channel and National Geographic in their basic offers, the distribution of Disney+ and VOD releases. Disney Junior and National Geographic Wild linear channels would then close down in France.

== Divisions ==
Cinema

- Walt Disney Studios Motion Pictures France (former Buena Vista International France), distribution unit.
- Walt Disney Studios Home Entertainment France (former Buena Vista Home Entertainment France), video distribution unit.
- Disneynature, a film unit that produces documentaries.

Television

- Disney Channel, flagship channel, it launched on March 22, 1997.
- Disney Channel +1, a 1-hour time shift channel.
- Disney Jr., a channel aimed mainly at children 2–7 years old. It launched in 2002 as Playhouse Disney.
- National Geographic
- National Geographic Wild
- BabyTV

Video on demand service

All its channels have an on-demand service associated.

- Disney Channel à la demande
- Disneytek, a buy and rent service dedicated to Disney, Marvel and Star Wars productions, which used to be a Free exclusive for a long time and is now part of other services such as Orange and Canal VOD.

Euro Disney S.A.S., Disney Store France and Disney+ are not part of The Walt Disney Company France.

== Closed divisions ==
Film distribution

- Walt Disney Productions France, S.A. a motion picture distributor formed in 1963 as Walt Disney Mickey Mouse, S.A. located in Champs-Élysées in Paris that handled the distribution of Disney films in France from July 1963 to December 1987. It was closed in December 1987.

Cinema and animation

- Walt Disney Animation France (former Brizzi Films), an animation studio launched in 1986 and closed in 2003.
- SIP Animation (Folded into BVS Entertainment)

Press

- Disney Hachette Presse, a magazine publisher co-own with Hachette Filipacchi Médias, closed in 2019. All publications are now published by Unique Heritage Media as part of a licensing agreement with The Walt Disney Company France.

Television

- Toon Disney and Toon Disney +1, a channel launched in 2002 and closed in 2007, replaced by Disney Cinemagic.
- ESPN Classic Sport, a sport channel launched in 2002 and closed in 2013.
- Jetix, a channel launched in 2004 replacing Fox Kids and closed in 2009, replaced by Disney XD.
- Disney XD, a channel launched in 2009 and closed in 2020.
- Disney Cinemagic and Disney Cinemagic +1, a cinema channel launched in 2007 and closed in 2015, replaced by Disney Cinema.
- Disney Cinema, a cinema channel launched in 2015 as a replacement for Disney Cinemagic and closed in 2020, due to the launch of Disney+.
- Voyage, documentary channel acquired in 2019 as part of the acquisition of Fox Networks Group and closed on 1 January 2021.

Video on demand service

- Disney Channel Avant-Première, premium on-demand service of Disney Channel active from 2011 to Summer 2015, replaced by Disney Channel Pop Pick Play which was initially an Orange exclusive.

These three on demand services were closed on 1 April 2020 with the arrival of Disney+.

- Disney Channel Pop Pick Play (2015–2018), Disney Channel Pop Pick (2017–2020), a service dedicated to Disney Channel productions, include in some TV packages.
- Disney English, an educational service include in some Canal+ packages.
- Holà Disney, an educational service include in some Canal+ packages.
- Fox Play, acquired from Fox Networks Group in 2019 and shut down on 31 December 2020, ahead of the launch of Star on Disney+ which was included in the same Canal+ offers.
- ABCtek, a buy and rent service dedicated to ABC Studios productions via Free from 2011 to 2022.
- Disneynature TV, a service dedicated to Disneynature productions.
- Disney Movies on Demand, a service dedicated to Disney movies, available via Zive/SFR Play for example.

== See also ==
- The Walt Disney Company Italy
- The Walt Disney Company Portugal
