= Ciné Palace =

- Country: France
- Broadcast area: France

Programming
- Language: French
- Picture format: 576i (4:3 SDTV)

Ownership
- Owner: AB Groupe

History
- Launched: 1996; 30 years ago
- Closed: September 2002; 23 years ago
- Replaced by: Ciné Box

Ciné Palace was a French television station of AB Groupe, which broadcast from 1996 to September 2002.

== History ==
In 1996, AB Groupe launched a cinema bouquet consisting of 5 channels: Action, Polar, Rire, Romance and Ciné Palace.

In September 2002, AB Groupe set up a new cinema bouquet, which was named Cinébox. It consisted of 4 channels: Ciné Comic, Ciné Polar, Ciné FX and Ciné Box which replaced Ciné Palace.
