= Ciné FX =

Cine FX
- Country: France
- Headquarters: 132, avenue du Président Wilson; 93213 La Plaine Saint-Denis

Programming
- Language: French

Ownership
- Owner: AB Groupe

History
- Launched: 15 September 2002
- Founder: Laurent Zameczkowski; Pascal Goubereau
- Closed: 31 July 2018; 7 years ago

Cine FX was a French television channel, owned by AB Groupe.

The channel was originally only available via AB Sat and as an option on CanalSat, but is now available through contract on the cinema option from AB, on cable, on ADSL, and on digital television packages.

At its start, in 1996, the cinema package of the AB group comprised five channels, but none which dealt with science fiction films. When the cinema package was reformatted on 15 September 2002, the channel created three others: Ciné Comic, Ciné Polar, and Ciné Box to replace the former CINEBOX. Today, the package is named CINERAMA and comprises this channel, as well as Ciné Polar, Cine First, and CinePop.

The programming comprises science fiction films from the 1950s to today, covering every subgenre, including programming the classics, Forbidden Planet, the films of Roger Corman, the studio Troma, and films such as 2001: A Space Odyssey.

Sundance Channel replaces Ciné FX on CanalSat on 1 July 2015 and Orange on 20 November 2015.

Cine FX and Polar are replaced by Paramount Channel and Crime District on 6 December 2016 on Bis Télévisions.

The shutdown of Cine FX and Polar was scheduled for April 30, 2018, but they were finally withdrawn from Bouygues Télécom and Numéricable-SFR. Both channels continued on Free until July 31, 2018.
