= Science et Vie TV =

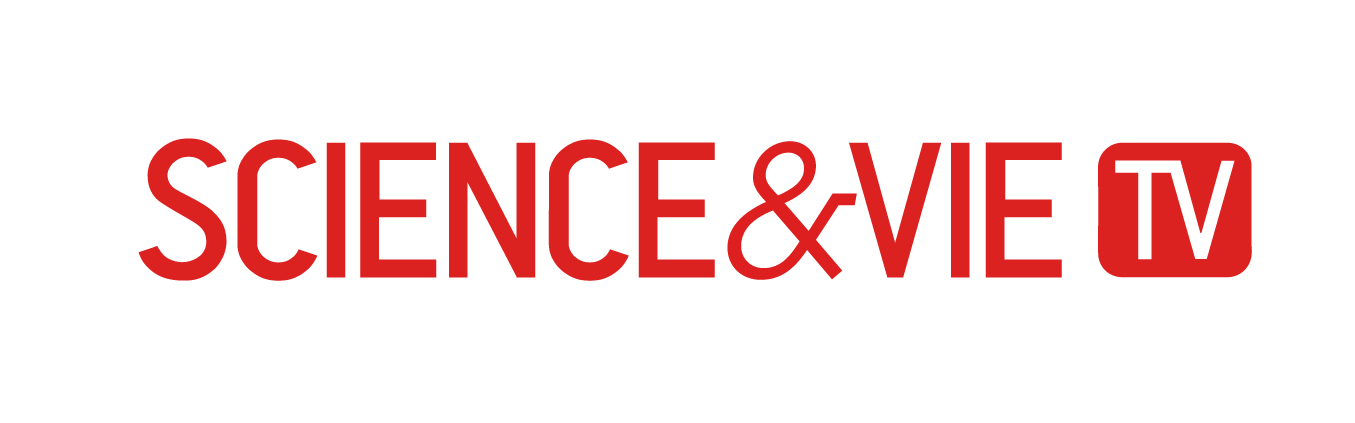
- Country: France
- Broadcast area: France
- Headquarters: La Plaine Saint-Denis, France

Programming
- Language(s): French
- Picture format: 576i (16:9 SDTV); 1080i (HDTV)

Ownership
- Owner: Mediawan Thematics (in partnership with Reworld Media)
- Sister channels: Toute l'Histoire; Trek; Animaux; Chasse et Pêche

History
- Launched: 30 March 2015; 10 years ago
- Replaced: Encyclo

Links
- Website: www.science-et-vie.tv

Science et Vie TV is a French thematic television channel dedicated to the scientific world.

== History ==
Science et Vie TV was launched on 30 March 2015 at 8:45 pm after an association between Mondadori France and AB Groupe, enabling the scientific journal Science & Vie to decline on television to replace the pre-existing Encyclo.

An educational service for young people Mon Science et Vie Junior associated with the magazine Science & Vie Junior was active until 12 January 2023.

In April 2016, Science et Vie TV became included in the basic offer of Canalsat, previously the channel was on its Crescendo option.

On 31 July 2022, Science et Vie TV was removed of Canal+.

== Programming ==
The channel evokes different aspects of science: technology, health, nature and environment, society and space.

- Le mag de la science: a weekly magazine presented by Jérôme Bonaldi dedicated to the man of the future.
- Megastructure: weekly documentary.
