= Trek (TV channel) =

- Country: France
- Broadcast area: France
- Headquarters: La Plaine Saint-Denis, France

Programming
- Language: French
- Picture format: 576i (16:9 SDTV); 1080i (HDTV)

Ownership
- Owner: Mediawan Thematics
- Sister channels: Toute l'Histoire; Science et Vie TV; Animaux; Chasse et Pêche

History
- Launched: 2 February 2015; 11 years ago
- Replaced: Escales (1996-2015)

Links
- Website: www.trekhd.tv

Trek is a French themed television channel owned by Mediawan Thematics.

== History ==
Trek began broadcasting on February 2, 2015, replacing Escales.

Trek was removed of Orange on 9 July 2020, and of Canal+ on 1 September 2020.

== Programming ==
The channel broadcasts programs dedicated to adventure, feats and thrills.

Every night of the week, Trek offers different sports: extreme on Monday, outdoor on Tuesdays, ski / snowboard on Wednesdays, expeditions on Thursdays, challenges on Friday, surfing on Saturdays and climbing on Sundays.
