= Mediawan Thematics =

French broadcasting group

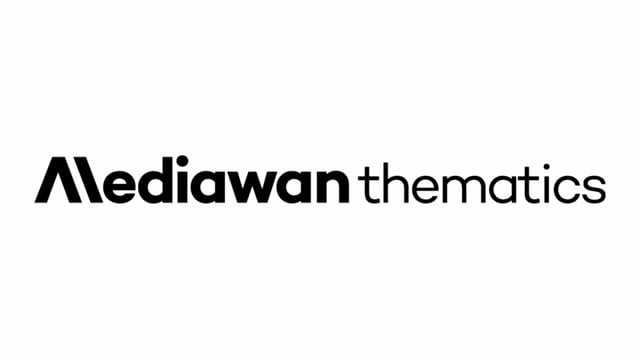
- Formerly: AB Productions (1977–1999); AB Groupe (1999–2018)
- Type: Subsidiary
- Industry: Media
- Founded: 1977; 49 years ago
- Headquarters: La Plaine Saint-Denis, Seine-Saint-Denis, Île-de-France, France
- Area served: Worldwide
- Owner: TF1 Group (2007–2017, 33.5%); Mediawan (2017–present)
- Website: www.mediawan.com/en/publishing

Mediawan Thematics (formerly known as AB Groupe) is a French television channel business and audiovisual distribution group in the field of broadcasting that is owned by Mediawan.

== History ==
Mediawan Thematics had its roots under the name of AB Productions which it was founded in 1977 by Jean-Luc Azoulay and Claude Berda as a music production company, and in 1987 went into the world of television.

In 1991, AB Productions created their own music record publishing label named AB Disques who had published their own music videos.

In December 1995, AB Groupe launched their first television channel named AB Channel 1 (now AB1).

In July 1996, AB Productions announced that they've expanded their catalogue by acquiring Pierre Grimblat's French production company Hamster Productions and its parent company The Hamster Group which had merged with AB Productions to become the biggest French television production company with Hamster Productions becoming a subsidiary of AB Productions.

In July 1999, AB Productions announced that their co-founders Jean-Luc Azoulay and Claude Berda had professionally separated and had split the AB Productions company into two companies.

In late-January 2016, AB Groupe announced that they've acquired Pascale Breugnot's production company Ego Productions.

In January 2017, it was announced that French special acquisition group Mediawan had entered exclusive negotiations to acquire AB Groupe along with their channels and four production companies along with their own distribution division AB International Distribution from its co-founder Claude Berda who had a 53% stake of the company alongside media company TF1 Group who owned a 33.5% stake, for €270 million in order for the former to build a European premium content leader and an audiovisual production and distribution group. The deal could hand over AB Groupe's production companies and their distribution division to Mediawan. Two months later in late-March of that same year, AB Groupe announced that French special acquisition group Mediawan had completed their acquisition of AB Groupe along with their channels, four production companies and their international distribution division from its co-founder Claude Berda who had a 53% stake of the company alongside media company TF1 Group who owned a 33.5% stake with AB Groupe becoming a fully owned subsidiary of Mediawan, marking Mediawan's first step into the premium production and distribution activities.

On 11 October 2018, AB Groupe was rebranded to Mediawan Thematics after the purchase by Mediawan in 2017.

== Television ==
Channel	Country	Category	Information
AB1	France	Entertainment	Pay-TV
AB3	Belgium	General	
ABX	Belgium	Entertainment Documentary	
Action	France	Movie channel	Pay-TV
Animaux	France	Documentary	Pay-TV
Automoto La chaîne	France	Motorsports	
Chasse et Pêche	France	Documentary	Pay-TV
Crime District	Luxembourg	Entertainment documentary	Pay-TV
Clubbing TV	France	Dance Music	Pay-TV
Science et Vie TV	France	Documentary	Pay-TV
Trek	France	Documentary	Pay-TV
Mangas	France	Teen	Pay-TV
Lucky Jack.tv	Luxembourg	Games	
RTL9	Luxembourg	General	Pay-TV
Toute l'Histoire	France	Documentary	Pay-TV
XXL	Netherlands	Adult	Pay-TV

=== Former channels ===
Channel	Country	Category	Start date	Close date
Vidéoclick	Belgium	Youth	3 April 2007	29 July 2009
AB4	Belgium	Entertainment	28 October 2002	13 September 2017 (replaced by ABXplore)
AB Moteurs	France	Sport	26 March 1999	5 November 2018 (replaced by Automoto La chaîne)
Encyclo	France	Documentary	6 June 1996	30 March 2015 (replaced by Science et Vie TV)
Escales	France	Documentary	2 April 1996	2 February 2015 (replaced by Trek)
Ciné Box	France	Movie channel	1996 (Ciné Palace); September 2002	24 August 2004
Ciné Comic	France	Movie channel	2 April 1996 (Rire); 2002	24 August 2004
Ciné Pop	France	Movie channel	21 August 2006	15 July 2007
Ciné First	France	Movie channel	31 December 2007	30 September 2010
Ciné FX	France	Movie channel	15 September 2002	31 July 2018
Ciné Polar	France	Movie channel	2 April 1996	31 July 2018
Fit TV	France	Fitness	2 April 1996	15 October 2007
Musique classique	France	Music	2 April 1996	15 October 2007
Melody	France	Music	1996	10 April 1997
Nostalgie la télé	France	Music	10 April 1997	July 1999
RFM TV	France	Music	5 July 1999	March 2005
Golf Channel	Luxembourg	Sport	26 September 2010	1 September 2024
Ultra Nature	France	Documentary	19 May 2016	12 January 2023
'Zik	France	Music	25 April 1998	31 December 2007
France Courses	France	Sport	9 September 1996	25 April 1998 (replaced by 'Zik on AB Sat, and recovered by the PMU and relaunched as Équidia)
AB Sports	France	Sport	23 December 1996	May 1999 (sold to Pathé and relaunched as Pathé Sport)
Onyx.tv	Germany	Music	6 January 1996	15 September 2004
NT1	France	General	31 March 2005	June 2009
TMC	Monaco	General	19 November 1954	June 2009
Terranova	Germany	Documentary	15 September 2004	10 July 2007

AB sold many channels, notably the free national channels TMC and NT1 taken over by TF1 when they were the main shareholder of AB Groupe.
