= Fit TV =

French fitness TV channel

- Country: France
- Broadcast area: France

Programming
- Language(s): French
- Picture format: 576i (4:3 SDTV)

Ownership
- Owner: AB Groupe

History
- Launched: 1996; 29 years ago
- Closed: 15 October 2007; 17 years ago

Fit TV was a French TV channel of AB Groupe dedicated to fitness.

== History ==
The channel was originally broadcast only on AB Sat, and then through a subscription on certain networks of cable operators and digital broadcasting TV packages.

It was broadcast from 7:30 am to 9 am on the same channel as Toute l'Histoire. Since the channel has stopped broadcasting 2007 without any explanation from AB Groupe, the Conseil supérieur de l'audiovisuel (CSA) was obliged to withdraw the authorization issued for Fit TV in November 2009.

== Programming ==
It was a channel devoted solely to fitness and was still re-broadcasting the same program loops from 1997 on.
