= La Chaîne Météo =

- Country: France
- Headquarters: Vernouillet, Yvelines

Programming
- Language: French
- Picture format: 576i (16:9 SDTV); 1080i (HDTV)

Ownership
- Owner: Météo consult

History
- Launched: 21 June 1995; 31 years ago
- Founder: Jacques-Philippe Broux

Links
- Website: lachainemeteo.com

La Chaîne Météo (lit. The Weather Channel) is a French TV channel, broadcasting weather forecasts 24 hours a day.

The channel is similar to the American cable and satellite service The Weather Channel.

Viewers can buy a paid membership to access the channel on their website.

== History ==
La Chaîne Météo was launched on the first day of summer 1995 at 7:00 a.m. by Jacques-Philippe Broux. The first weather information was presented on air by Alain Goury and Carine Rocchesani.

On 1 October 2008, the Le Figaro group bought the company Météo Consult, which included La Chaîne Météo.

== See also ==
- The Weather Channel
- Canalsat
