= Planète+ =

French television channel

- Logo in Poland since 2014.
- Country: France; Poland
- Broadcast area: France; Belgium; Switzerland; Poland; Africa; Canada

Programming
- Languages: French; Polish
- Picture format: 1080i (HDTV); 576i (SDTV)

Ownership
- Owner: Canal+ Thématiques (Canal+)
- Sister channels: Planète+ Crime; Planète+ Aventure; Télétoon+

History
- Launched: 19 September 1988; 37 years ago
- Former names: Planète Câble (1988-1999); Planète (1999-2011)

Links
- Website: Planète+

Planète+ (formerly Planète Câble and Planète) is a French television network that primarily broadcasts documentaries. It is owned by Canal+. It is available on digital terrestrial television. In Canada, a local version entitled Planète+ Canada is distributed by Thema Canada, a local division of Canal+ international distribution company.

== History ==
Planète Câble was created on 19 September 1988 by Ellipse Câble to enrich the nascent cable TV offering with a new genre for a thematic channel: documentaries. On 14 November 1992, Planète Câble became available by satellite as part of the 4 initial basic channels of the CanalSatellite bouquet.

On 20 September 1995, MultiThématiques took over from Ellipse Câble with TeleCommunications International inc. and Générale d'images in order to develop the group's channels internationally. The channel was exported in Poland on 4 December 1996, and in Italy and Germany in 1997 (in Spain, Canal+ created Documanía in 1993). Canal+ divested most of them and only the Polish channel is still active.

On 4 September 1999, the channel was renamed Planète (since it was no longer broadcast exclusively by cable, this name had become obsolete), and its sister channel Planète 2 was launched that month.

In the early 2000s, the channel applied to be broadcast on pay DTT, which was due to be launched in 2005. Its authorization delivered on 10 June 2003 was cancelled by a Conseil d'État's decision on 20 October 2004, on the grounds that Lagardère Active and Groupe Canal+ jointly controlled Lagardère Thématiques and multiThématiques, whereas a single group is only entitled to hold a maximum of seven national DTT authorisations, and five at the time of the deliberations. Both groups divested their cross-shareholdings in January 2005 while Planète reapplied in December 2004 and got its terrestrial licence back. Planète began broadcasting its programmes on 21 November 2005 on channel 35 via Canal+'s “Minipack” package (which also included the Paris Première, Eurosport and Canal J channels).

On 17 May 2011, Planète, like some of the Canal+ thematic channels, was rebranded using the Canal+ "+" sign, becoming Planète+, like Télétoon+ and Piwi+. The move was also applied in Poland with Planete being rebranded as Planete+ on 11 November 2011, with its launch in HD.

In 2014, the pay DTT channels Planète+, LCI and Paris Première auditioned to be allowed to become free, but they were all refused in June. On 14 September 2015, the same channels were auditioned again for a possible move to free DTT, and on 17 December 2015, the CSA has only granted the move to LCI coincidentally with the full transition of French DTT to HD. The CSA asserted against Planète+ that ‘maintaining the current method of financing would not lead to the disappearance of this service, either in the short or medium term’ (unlike LCI) and that a move to free DTT would have ‘affected RMC Découverte’ and its offering being 'too close to the channels of the France Télévisions group or the Arte service'.

in 2022, Planète+ was refocused as a history channel, following the launch of the premium channel Canal+ Docs in September 2021.

In 2024, Planète+ has applied for the renewal of its DTT frequency for 10 more years. However, In response to ARCOM's withdrawal of the terrestrial licence of C8 and an increasingly restrictive tax and regulatory environment, Canal+ has announced on 5 December that it is withdrawing all its pay-TV channels from DTT, which will not be renewed and will cease broadcasting in June 2025.

== Broadcast ==
In France, Planète+ is exclusively carried through Canal+. On 1 July 2016, Planète+ channels were removed of Numericable as it had lost the exclusivity exemption it had for its cable network after it put its in channels with SFR fiber-optic offers after buying it in 2014.

Planète+ is distributed around all the French-speaking world, including Canada with a locally edited version.

In Poland from 10 December 2021, Planete+ is available (along with other thematic channels) on Polsat Box.

== Sister channels ==
In December 1997, its first sister channel Planète Forum was launched at a time of strong competition with TPS which had Odyssée. On 15 September 1999, Planète 2 was launched.

On 3 December 2001, Planète Forum was replaced by Planète Future. Its programming was changed to focus on the future, inspired by reality and fiction.

In July 2002, MultiThématiques and France Télévisions announced that they had signed an agreement to create a television channel based on the programme Thalassa, broadcast on France 3 since 1975. It was launched on 1 November 2002 under the name Planète Thalassa, replacing Planète 2.

On 5 November 2003, the educational children documentary channel Ma Planète was launched co-owned by France Télévisions at 34%, as a response to Eurêka launched earlier that year by TPS.

On 28 August 2004, Planète Future became Planète Choc. The channel's programming was aimed at a 15-34 year-old audience, and Bruno Thibaudeau, MultiThématiques' Deputy Managing Director of Channels, described it as “explosive” and “sometimes provocative”.

On 6 February 2007, Planète Choc became Planète No Limit. It kept the same focus, but dropped its much-criticised reality show element. Planète Justice was also launched that year as another joint venture with France Télévisions, and as part of Canalsat's merger with TPS, Ma Planète merged with Eurêka closing on 4 May 2007 and was renamed Planète Juniors on 4 September 2007.

Planète Juniors was shut down on 22 March 2009, with programming moving to Télétoon.

On 17 May 2011, the channels all got rebranded as Planète+ Thalassa, Planète+ Justice and Planète+ No Limit.

On 13 November 2013, Planète+ Justice and Planète+ No Limit became respectively Planète+ CI and Planète+ A&E in association with American programme publisher A&E Networks.

On 1 January 2016, Planète+ Thalassa was shut down.

On 17 February 2022, Planète+ Aventure&Expérience and Planète+ Crime+Investigation were renamed Planète+ Aventure and Planète+ Crime, dropping the A&E Networks co-branding.
