= Christian Dutoit =

French journalist (1940–2021)

- Born: Christian Jacques Dutoit; 18 October 1940; Rabat, French Morocco
- Died: 5 September 2021 (aged 80); Paris, France
- Occupation: Journalist

Christian Jacques Dutoit (18 October 1940 – 5 September 2021) was a French journalist.

== Biography ==
Dutoit was close with Pierre Desproges and made his career at the Office de Radiodiffusion Télévision Française (ORTF) in the 1960s and 70s. In 1981, he was appointed director of programs for Antenne 2. He also headed the development and launch of La Cinq in 1985. He became deputy managing director of TF1 in 1987 and was the founder of La Chaîne Info in 1993. In 1995, he designed and launched 18 channels in the AB Sat package and developed i>Télé for Groupe Canal+ in 1997. In 2002, he became director of productions for Expand.

From 2003 to 2009, Dutoit was a member of the Conseil supérieur de l'audiovisuel. In 2009, he joined the French Economic, Social and Environmental Council.

Christian Dutoit died on 5 September 2021 at the age of 80.

== Distinctions ==
- Knight of the Legion of Honour (1994)
- Combatant's Cross
- Medal of the Nation's Gratitude
