= Animaux =

French television channel

- Country: France
- Headquarters: 132, avenue du Président Wilson; 93213 La Plaine Saint-Denis

Programming
- Language(s): French
- Picture format: 16:9 (1080i, HDTV)

Ownership
- Owner: Mediawan Thematics

History
- Launched: 2 April 1996
- Former names: AB Animaux (1996–1999)

Links
- Website: www.animauxtv.fr

Animaux is a French pay television channel themed about animals.

== History ==
Created in April 1996 ahead of the launch of its digital satellite package AB Sat, AB Animaux was dedicated to animal documentaries. In 1999, it was renamed as Animaux.

After rumours of the sale of the channel by AB Groupe at the start of 2006, the channel eventually ended up being exclusively shown on CanalSat by satellite at the time.

On 1 May 2017, Animaux got its current rebranding.

== Owners ==
- President: Jean-Michel Fava
- Programme director: Richard Maroko
- Marketing & Business Development director: Gregg Bywalski

=== Budget ===
Animaux is run by AB Sat SA with a budget of €24 million, 100% provided by Mediawan Thematics.

== Programmes ==
The channel specialises in the environment, and principally shows animal documentaries. It has also introduced regular reports on the protection of flora and fauna. Allain Bougrain-Dubourg joined the channel as a director in 2005.

=== Programmes ===
- Territoires Sauvages : Discovery of inexpored territories and the animals who live there (Tuesday 17:55)
- Des Animaux et des Hommes : Stories about the relationship between man and animal (Saturday 18:25) *Totalement Fauve : Big game, such as lion, puma, tiger and leopard, (Thursday 17:55).
- A Vol d'Oiseau : Programme based on ornithology (Friday 17:55).
- Animaux en Danger : Programme which deals with saving the planet, (Sunday 19:00).
- Histoires d'eaux : The story of animal life in fresh and salt water (Wednesday 17:55).

== Broadcast ==
Animaux was originally only shown via AB Sat, but is now available on a contract on French, Monacan, Belgian, Luxembourgish and Swiss cable and via the Canal+ or Bis TV packages available to customers on satellite and IPTV platforms as well as Non-European ones such as Francophone Africa, Lebanon, Overseas France and Haiti.

== See also ==
- Chasse et Pêche
- Science et Vie TV
- Toute l'Histoire
- Trek
