= National Geographic (French TV channel) =

- Country: France
- Broadcast area: France; Belgium; Luxembourg; Switzerland; Monaco; Overseas France; Francophone Africa
- Headquarters: Paris, France

Ownership
- Owner: The Walt Disney Company France
- Sister channels: National Geographic Wild; Voyage

History
- Launched: 22 September 2001
- Closed: 1 January 2025 (on Canal+)
- Former names: National Geographic Channel (2001–2016)

Links
- Website: http://www.nationalgeographic.fr

National Geographic is a French television channel that broadcasts documentaries and factual programmes produced by the American counterpart, in French. It was launched on 22 September 2001 on CanalSatellite and cable television.

In 2014, National Geographic became a free channel on French IPTV platforms, but it become again a Canal exclusive in 2018.

Since 1 January 2025, the channel, along with National Geographic Wild, Disney Channel and Disney Jr. are no longer available on Canal+ due to the non-renewal of its exclusive agreement with Disney. National Geographic and Disney Channel returned to the basic offers of Orange and Free, while National Geographic Wild and Disney Junior have become unavailable in France., remaining available in Belgium, Luxembourg and Switzerland.
