= Onyx.tv =

- Country: Germany
- Broadcast area: Germany
- Headquarters: Cologne, Germany

Programming
- Language: German
- Picture format: 576i (4:3 SDTV)

Ownership
- Owner: AB Groupe

History
- Launched: 6 January 1996; 30 years ago
- Closed: 15 September 2004; 21 years ago
- Replaced by: Terranova

Links
- Website: www.onyx.tv

Onyx.tv was a German music television channel operated by the French AB Groupe.

Unlike MTV and VIVA, it had a reputation for less mainstream but alternative music such as punk subculture, electronic music or trip hop.

== History ==
The broadcast began on 6 January 1996 under the name Onyx Music Television. On 15 September 2004, the French owner AB Groupe replaced the channel with the documentation channel terranova.
