= Polar (TV channel) =

- Country: France
- Broadcast area: France
- Headquarters: La Plaine Saint-Denis, France

Programming
- Language: French
- Picture format: 576i (16:9 SDTV); 1080i (HDTV)

Ownership
- Owner: AB Groupe
- Sister channels: Ciné FX, Action

History
- Launched: 2 April 1996; 30 years ago
- Closed: 31 July 2018; 8 years ago

Links
- Website: www.cinepolar.com

Ciné Polar was a French television channel owned by AB Groupe.

== History ==
The channel was originally only available on AB Sat and as an option on CanalSat, but is now available through a cinema contract with AB, on cable, on ADSL, and on digital television packages.

Change in cinema package:

- At its launch in 1996, the cinema package of AB Groupe comprised five channels: Ciné Palace, Rire (comedies), Romance (sentimental films), Polar (crime and suspense films) and Action
- Due to the repackaging of the cinema package in September 2002, the cinema bouquet formerly known as CINEBOX now has new channels named Ciné Box, Ciné comic (formerly Rire), Ciné Polar (formerly Polar) and Ciné FX.
- Today, Ciné FX and Ciné Polar are no longer available.

From its cinema channels launched in 1996, only Action is still active.

At the heart of the programming are names in classic films noirs, such as the first works of Alfred Hitchcock.

On 4 December 2012, Ciné Polar became Polar again. On 30 June 2015, it was removed from Canalsat. On 20 November 2015, the channel was removed from the TV d'Orange.

On 6 December 2016, Polar and Ciné FX were replaced by Paramount Channel and Crime District on Bis Télévisions.

Polar and Ciné FX' closure was planned for long-time ago, on 31 December 2015 and later reported to 30 April 2018.

On 31 July 2018, Polar was ultimately closed on Free and was replaced by Crime District.

== Managers ==
Président
Jean-Michel Fava
Director of cinema channels
Laurent Zameczkowsk
Director of programmes
Richard Maroko
