= Voyage (French TV channel) =

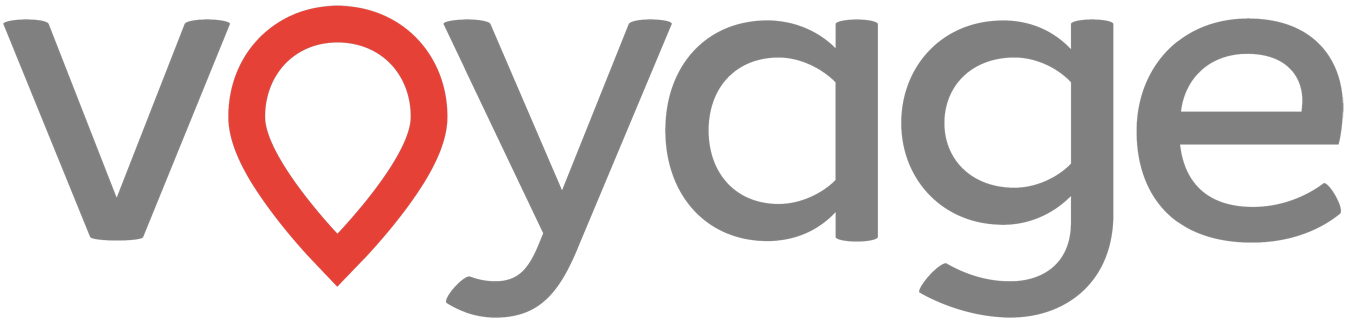
- Country: France
- Broadcast area: France
- Headquarters: Paris, France

Programming
- Language: French
- Picture format: 576i (16:9 SDTV); 1080i (HDTV)

Ownership
- Owner: The Walt Disney Company France
- Sister channels: National Geographic; National Geographic Wild

History
- Launched: May 31, 1996
- Founder: Canal Satellite
- Closed: December 31, 2020 (24 years, 214 days)

Links
- Website: www.voyage.fr

Voyage was a French television channel devoted to discovery and escape through travel which had been owned by the Fox Networks Group since 2004. It was closed on December 31, 2020.

The headquarters of Voyage used to occupy the former headquarters of La Cinq, at 241 Boulevard Pereire in the 17th arrondissement of Paris.

== History ==
Voyage was launched on Canal Satellite on 31 May 1996. The channel was acquired in May 1997 by Pathé, which sold it in 2004 to Fox International Channels. Following Disney's takeover of Fox Networks Group, the channel ceased broadcasting on December 31, 2020.
