= La Latina TV =

French television channel (2005-2006)

La Latina TV was a French television channel catering the Latin American diaspora in Europe, particularly French-speaking areas. The channel existed from 2005 to 2006.

== History ==
The channel was announced on 20 May 2004 with the aim of starting on 12 September, set to become the first channel targeting the Latin American community in France. Its output would consist of programs dedicated to Latin American culture, such as culture, music and tourism, as well as Latin American telenovelas. Its founder Guillermo Spivak, born in Argentina and living in France since 1981, spent €5 million to create the channel, which now had a new tentative launch date of 1 March 2005. At launch, it was scheduled to be carried on Canal Satellite and Noos. It was also expected that the channel's coverage area would increase to include Spain, Portugal, Germany and Italy, and provide 25 hours of original programming per week. Negotiations with major Latin American television companies were underway.

The launch was subsequently delayed to 1 May 2005. Programming was spoken in French, Spanish and Portuguese, with some of its programming being subtitled into French in an initial phase, followed by German and English in a second phase. According to a CSA ruling, 49% of its programming would consist of fiction, 21% music, 18% knowledge and 12% variety. Launch programming consisted of titles such as Oppenheimer presenta, the original program La movida latina about the Latin American cultural scene, Venezuelan telenovela Negra consentida, Mexican telenovela Destino de mujeres and the Colombian animated telenovela Blanca y pura. Feature films and documentaries from Latin American countries were also scheduled. Its programming was curated on purpose to attract Latin and non-Latinophile audiences. In terms of sports, it also announced its intent to air the CONMEBOL qualifiers for the 2006 FIFA World Cup, but none of the matches would be aired live.

Broadcasts of the channel began on 2 May 2005, on Canalsat and on Astra. In July, the channel was added to Freebox TV, increasing its subscriber base.

On 13 January 2006, La Latina TV announced that it would suspend operations at midnight on 31 January in order to improve its finances. The channel was set to resume in September that year with a new formula, consisting exclusively of telenovelas. The channel likely closed without starting under the new format.
