= Olympia TV =

- Country: France
- Broadcast area: France

Programming
- Language: French
- Picture format: 1080i (HDTV); 576i (SDTV)

Ownership
- Owner: Canal+

History
- Launched: 21 January 2020; 6 years ago
- Closed: 30 June 2026; 5 days ago

Olympia TV was a French subscription television channel, owned by Canal+. The channel broadcast theatrical plays and related performances, nightly from 8pm to 1am, exclusively on the Canal+ platform.

== History ==
Canal+ announced the channel in November 2019 as part of an agreement with the Olympia Hall. As part of the synergy plan between both companies, there would be a preface (the Olympia Awards) on C8 in December, with the channel launching in January 2020. The channel was supported by Francis Huster.

The channel launched on 21 January 2020; on 25 February, Delphine Dewost was named its editorial director.

Screen+ reported that the channel was scheduled to close on 30 June 2026. The closure was confirmed by Canal+ to its subscribers on 29 May.

== Programming ==
As of launching time:

- Monday: contemporary theatre
- Tuesday: pop/rock concerts
- Wednesday: modern circus
- Thursday: humour
- Friday: theatre classics
- Saturday: classical operas or ballet
- Sunday: concerts

A daily magazine programme aired at 8pm before the normal programmes began. Performances seen on the channel were from the Olympia Hall, but international concerts, as well as concerts and performances from other French halls, also aired.
