= Encyclo =

French television channel

- Country: France
- Headquarters: La Plaine Saint-Denis, France

Programming
- Language: French
- Picture format: 576i (16:9 SDTV)

Ownership
- Owner: AB Groupe

History
- Launched: 6 June 1996; 30 years ago
- Closed: 30 March 2015; 11 years ago
- Replaced by: Science et Vie TV

Links
- Website: www.encyclotv.com

Encyclopédia (Stylized ENCYCLO) was a French television channel dedicated to encyclopedic knowledge.

== History of the channel ==
Encyclopédia was launched in 1996 with the launch of the AB Sat satellite package as a documentary channel dedicated to encyclopedic knowledge, but mostly on science and engineering, notably medicine and modern inventions.

After rumors of the sale of the channel by AB Groupe in early 2007, he finally remained in the fold of the group.

Officially named Encyclopaedia, it was most of the time called simply Encyclo. This problem was solved on the occasion of its fifteenth birthday, when its name was shortened.

On 30 March 2015, at 8:50 pm, the channel changed its name to Science et Vie TV.

=== Budget ===
Encyclopédia is owned by AB Sat SA and has a budget of €24 million, provided 100% by AB Group.

== Programmes ==
Its programmes consist of documentaries based on discovery, knowledge, and all scientific disciplines (ecology, medical science, astronomy, etc.).

- Au cœur de la science : weekly magazine presented by Michel Chevalet exploring one scientific theme in the news.

== Broadcast ==
Encyclopédia was originally shown only on AB Sat, but is now available through a contract on French and Swiss cable networks, on the Nouveau Canalsat satellite package, and through AB Groupe, the channel is available on the major ADSL packages.
