= Ciné Pop =

- Country: France
- Broadcast area: France

Programming
- Language(s): French
- Picture format: 576i (4:3 SDTV)

Ownership
- Owner: AB Groupe

History
- Launched: 2 August 1996; 28 years ago
- Closed: 21 June 2007; 17 years ago

Links
- Website: Closed

Ciné Pop was a French TV channel owned by AB Groupe shown on satellite which showed exclusive films oriented to families and children.

== History ==
In 1996, AB Group launched a bunch of five cinema channels: Action, Ciné Palace, Polar, Romance and Rire. The latter is centered on humorous cinema.

During the redesign of the cinema channels in 2002 by the group, the bouquet is called Cinébox and the channel becomes Ciné Comic. It maintains the same orientation in its programs, that is to say, humorous cinema. However, it will be suppressed in August 2004 at the same time as the cinema showcase, Ciné Box.

In 2007, 3 years after the stop of Ciné Comic, AB Group decides to re-experience the experience by creating a similar channel centered on family cinema. Initially named Ciné Pop Corn then Ciné Funilly, the channel got the name Ciné Pop.

After 10 months of broadcasting, it was abruptly suppressed to give way to new channels promised by AB Groupe.

== Broadcasting ==
The channel was shown on the satellite packages of Bis Télévisions and AB Groupe.
