= Ultra Nature =

- Broadcast area: France
- Headquarters: La Plaine Saint-Denis, France

Programming
- Language: French
- Picture format: 1080i (HDTV)

Ownership
- Owner: Mediawan Thematics

History
- Launched: 19 May 2016
- Closed: 12 January 2023

Links
- Website: www.ultranature.tv

Ultra Nature was a French themed television channel owned by Mediawan Thematics. Disseminated in ultra-high definition, it is devoted to animal documentaries, discovery, travel and extreme sports. Mediawan Thematics is partnering with The Explorers Network, an ultra-high definition content producer with the documentary series "The Explorers".

== History ==
Ultra Nature began broadcasting on 19 May 2016 on the Livebox of Orange France.

It was announced on Twitter that the channel will stop broadcasting at the end of 2022.

== Programming ==
Ultra Nature broadcasts movies from wildlife, discovery, travel and extreme sports.
