= Lucky Jack.tv =

- Headquarters: Luxembourg City, Luxembourg

Programming
- Language: French
- Picture format: 576i (16:9 SDTV)

Ownership
- Owner: AB Groupe

History
- Launched: 26 September 2010; 16 years ago

Links
- Website: www.luckyjack.tv

Lucky Jack.tv is a television channel broadcasting from Luxembourg, devoted to poker and online sports betting games created in September 2010. It belongs to Mediawan Thematics.

== History ==
Lucky Jack.tv was created by AB Groupe and was officially launched on 26 September 2010 on TV, along with its sister channel Golf Channel.

From 6 April 2020 to 8 July 2020, Luckyjack.tv was replaced by the pop-up channel #àLaMaison, operated by Mediawan in association with other French media groups (France Télévisions, Groupe TF1, Groupe M6, Groupe Canal+, Gaumont, Pathé, the 4 ISPs and digital medias) during the COVID-19 lockdown.

== Programming ==
=== Local tournaments ===
The channel broadcasts or reruns many local poker tournaments held in the United States:

- The Big Game
- High Stakes Poker
- Learn from the Pros
- Poker After Dark
- Pro-Am Poker Equalizer
- World Cup of Poker

=== International tournaments ===
The channel also broadcasts or reruns international tournaments:

- Aussie Millions
- European Poker Tour
- National Heads Up Poker Championship
- Professional Poker Tour
- World Poker Tour

== Broadcasting ==
It is broadcast on the basic ISP bouquets of Bouygues, Free, Orange and SFR.
