= Golf Channel France =

Golf television channel from Luxembourg

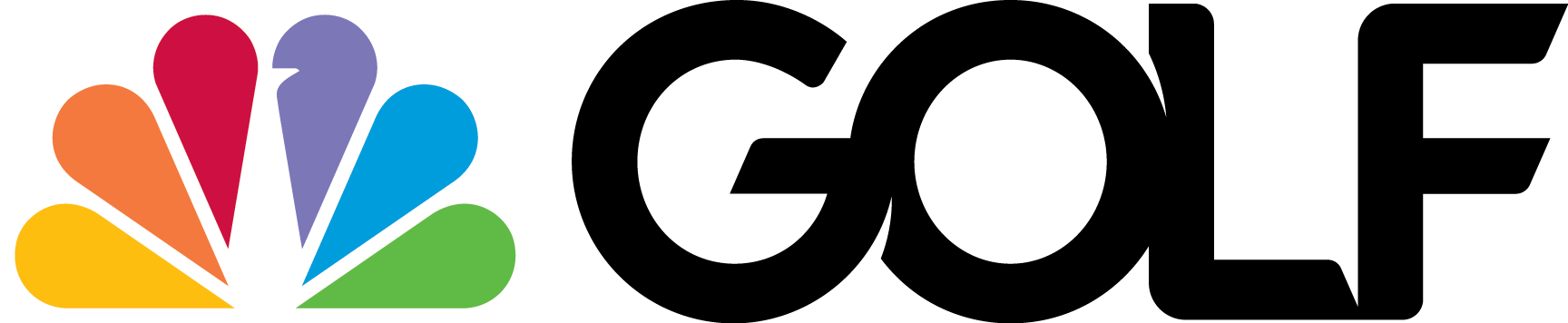
- Country: France
- Broadcast area: France
- Headquarters: Luxembourg City, Luxembourg

Programming
- Language: French
- Picture format: 576i (16:9 SDTV)

Ownership
- Owner: Mediawan Thematics

History
- Launched: 26 September 2010; 15 years ago
- Closed: 1 September 2024; 14 months ago

Links
- Website: Closed

Golf Channel France was a television channel broadcasting from Luxembourg devoted to golf. It was owned by Mediawan Thematics.

== History ==
Golf Channel France was a partnership between Mediawan Thematics and the American television channel Golf Channel. Thus, the French channel broadcasts programs from the US channel. It was the only thematic channel devoted solely to golf in France before the launch of Golf+ by the Canal+ Group in July 2012. Golf+ holds all rights to broadcast European and American tournaments for direct broadcasts. As a result, Golf Channel does not broadcast any of these live tournaments, but instead airs the LPGA Tour, Solheim Cup and Asian Tour.

It ceased broadcasting on September 1, 2024, after not renewing the contract with NBCUniversal.
