= Automoto La chaîne =

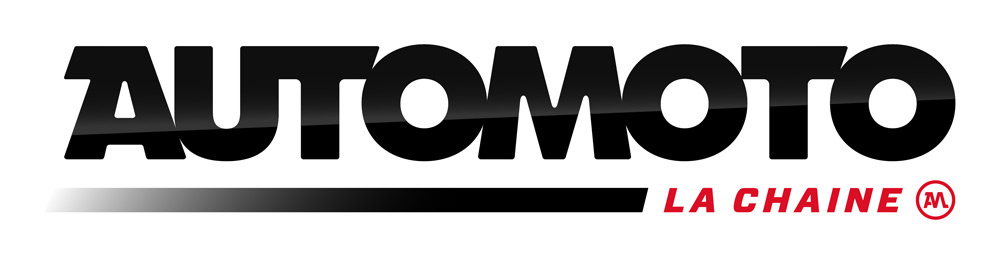
- Country: France
- Broadcast area: Nationwide
- Headquarters: La Plaine Saint-Denis, France

Programming
- Language: French
- Picture format: 1080i (HDTV) (HD feed downgraded to letterboxed 576i for SDTVs)

Ownership
- Owner: Mediawan Thematics

History
- Launched: 26 March 1996; 30 years ago
- Former names: Automobile (1996–1999); AB Moteurs (1999–2018)

Links
- Website: abmoteurs.fr

Automoto la chaîne is a French television channel dedicated to motorsports.

== History of the channel ==
The channel was created in March 1996 for the AB Sat package under the name Automobile as a channel dedicated to cars in all ways (collections, history of classic models, tracks, etc.).

AB Moteurs logo

Due to the same of AB Sports to the Pathé group in 1997, the channel was reformatted to fill the gap on the AB Sat package, and appeal to a young male audience. The channel was renamed AB Moteurs in 1998 and contained programmes around various motorsport: cars, bikes, aeroplanes and boats, broadcasting a number of races live, in competitions with the other French sports channels, Eurosport and Sport+.

In 2008, AB Moteurs tried to attract an even wider audience and consequently reformulates its grid around 4 main axes: live competition, tuning, tests and documentaries.

Its main competitor was the Motors TV channel, which was available on AB Sat for a while.

On 12 July 2018, Mediawan, owner of AB Groupe, announced that it had signed an agreement with TF1 to launch the Automoto channel. In September 2018, AB Moteurs will be rebranded and will bear the name of the TF1 show broadcast every Sunday.

The two audiovisual groups explain that "Automoto's ambition will be to offer the best in car and motorcycle lifestyle while keeping the flagship competitions such as the NASCAR Cup Series or the Paris Supercross. Many new magazines will be added to the network: a magazine dedicated to classic cars, motorcycles and tests, as well as other new products that will be unveiled at the World Car Show. The channel will be available from operators who already offer AB Moteurs, namely Canal, Bis Télévisions, Orange, Free, SFR, Bouygues Telecom, Molotov TV and Watch it.

=== Capital ===
AB Moteurs is owned by AB Sat SA and has a budget of €24 million, provided 50% by AB Groupe.

== Programmes ==
The programmes consist of practical documentaries about car ownership, whether precision (tuning) or general, but also show replays of motorsport events such as NASCAR, the DTM championships, Rally, Moto GP, etc. AB Moteurs shows live NASCAR Sprint Cup Series races uninterrupted with French (Pat Angeli and Philippe Chéreau) and Turkish commentary. Numerous clips of Sprint Cup Series races from recent seasons with Angeli's and Chéreau's excitable and enthusiastic commentary have been uploaded to YouTube.

=== Shows ===
- V6 : Car magazine presented by Stéphane Rotenberg.
- Plein Phares : Magazine to discover motorsport and watersport personalities presented by Alexandre Debanne.

== Broadcast ==
AB Moteurs was originally shown only on AB Sat, but is now available through a contract on French, Belgian, Luxembourgish, Monegasque and Swiss cable and on digital television.
