= TG+ (TV channel) =

téléGrenoble Isère is a private local TV channel of Grenoble's agglomeration in France. It broadcast on digital television and it is also received in a large part of Isère (Voiron and in Oisans for the ski resorts such as Alpe d'Huez and Les Deux Alpes).

téléGrenoble Isère began broadcasting on 20 October 2005. It is headquartered in rue Eugène-Faure in Grenoble.

In 2016, The Superior Council of Audiovisual authorizes the channel to broadcast in high definition.

== Organisation ==
President : Gérard Balthazard.

Presenters : Thibault Leduc, Marie-Caroline Abrial, Lucile Dailly, Laury Baillet, Olivier Escalon, Fanny Chatchate and Mélanie Tournadre.
