= Musique classique =

- Country: France
- Broadcast area: France

Programming
- Language(s): French
- Picture format: 576i (4:3 SDTV)

Ownership
- Owner: AB Groupe

History
- Launched: 2 April 1996; 28 years ago
- Closed: 15 October 2007; 17 years ago
- Replaced by: Ciné First

Links
- Website: www.musiqueclassique.fr

Created on 2 April 1996, Musique Classique was a television channel owned by AB Groupe.

The programming consisted of classical concerts, opera, lyrical works, and magazine programmes (e.g. À livret ouvert...).

The channel was run by Jean-Michel Fava.

Musique Classique was shown on the AB Sat package, some cable operators, such as Noos-Numericable (see also Numericable (NOOS)) and ADSL operators such as Freebox TV. The channel was not available on Canalsat or TPS.

== History ==
On October 15, 2007, at 10:00 AM, the channel ceased broadcasting to make way for Ciné First, which also stopped in September 2010.
