= Terranova (TV) =

- Country: Germany
- Broadcast area: Germany
- Headquarters: Cologne, Germany

Programming
- Language(s): German
- Picture format: 576i (4:3 SDTV)

Ownership
- Owner: AB Groupe

History
- Launched: 15 September 2004; 20 years ago
- Replaced: Onyx.tv
- Closed: 10 July 2007; 17 years ago

Links
- Website: www.terra-nova.de

Terranova was a German television channel based on nature and ecology.

== History of the channel ==
Terranova was launched in September 2004 by AB Groupe to replace the German music channel Onyx.tv. The channel was finally stopped on 10 July 2007 .

== Organisation ==
=== Managers ===
Director general :

- Ludi Boeken

=== Budget ===
Terranova was owned by ONYX Television GmbH, funded 100% by AB Groupe.

== Programmes ==
The channel showed a number of documentaries around animals and nature and the environment.

=== Shows ===
- Cohn-Bendit trifft... : Talk show of one hour, presented by Daniel Cohn-Bendit on political, ecological, and economic news.
- Green Planet : Magazine based on ecology.
