= ABX (TV channel) =

French-language TV channel in Belgium

- Country: Belgium
- Headquarters: Brussels, Belgium

Programming
- Language: French
- Picture format: 1080i (16:9 HDTV)

Ownership
- Owner: Mediawan Thematics
- Sister channels: AB3

History
- Launched: 13 September 2017; 9 years ago
- Replaced: AB4
- Former names: ABXplore (2017-2025)

Links
- Website: www.abxtv.be

ABX is a private commercial thematic television channel of the French Community of Belgium operated by Mediawan Thematics.

== History ==
On September 13, 2017, AB Groupe decided to rename AB4 by becoming ABXplore, and reformat it into a channel devoted to documentaries called entertainment for a public aged 15 to 49.

ABXplore becomes ABX on September 15, 2025.

At its launch in 2017, ABXplore's programming was mainly dedicated to documentaries in partnership with groups such as Discovery Channel, BBC, and National Geographic Channel, with a specific theme for each night of the week.

Wednesdays and Saturdays were dedicated to American wrestling in prime time and as a Belgian premiere with WWE Smackdown and WWE Raw. Until July 2019, the channel also broadcast wrestling Pay-per-view events live.

Since September 12, 2019, in addition to its website, ABX programs are also available for replay on the RTBF's auvio platform.

Starting September 5, 2025, the channel adopted a more generalist tone, broadcasting The Simpsons every Friday in the early evening, starting from season 29, along with the introduction of fiction on Monday nights.

Following the end of wrestling broadcasts on January 1, 2026, due to the move to Netflix, ABX pivoted to other programming and began offering live coverage of the NASCAR Cup Series starting February 15, 2026.

Although it remains a thematic channel, ABX nonetheless maintains a generalist focus:

• Thematic: It maintains a core lineup focusing on action, extreme sports, investigations, and speed.

• Generalist Focus: It has expanded its prime time and other slots with popular programming (blockbuster action films, series like The Simpsons), allowing it to attract and retain a broader audience, typical of a general-interest channel.
