= La Chaîne parlementaire =

French legislature broadcaster

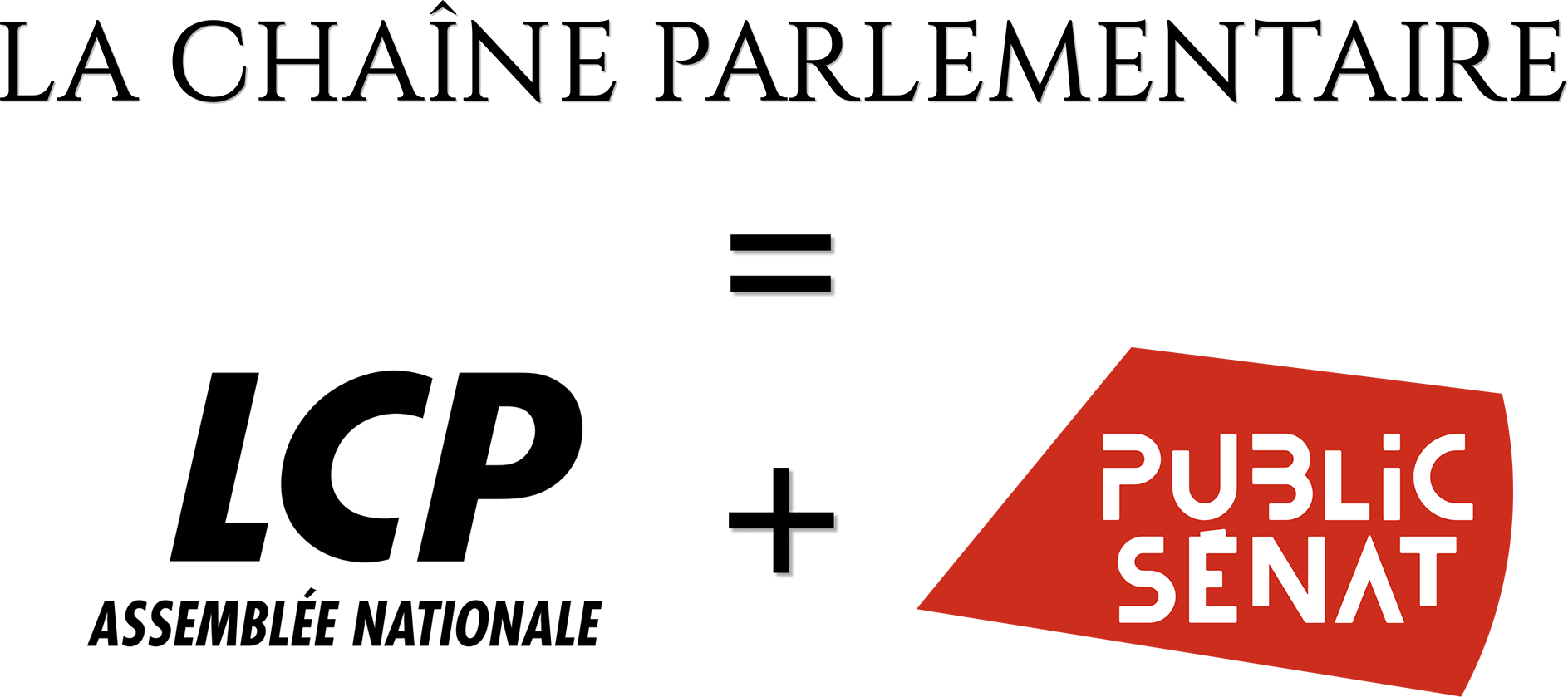
- Country: France

History
- Launched: 2 October 1993; 32 years ago (as Canal Assemblée nationale); April 1996; 30 years ago (as Canal Assemblées); 30 December 1999; 26 years ago (as La Chaîne parlementaire)

Links
- Website: www.lcp.fr www.publicsenat.fr

Availability

Terrestrial
- TNT: Channel 8

La Chaîne parlementaire (pronounced [la ʃɛːn paʁləmɑ̃tɛːʁ]; French for 'The Parliamentary Channel') is a French television network created that combines the station LCP - Assemblée nationale along with its sister station Public Sénat, under one channel station, by law on 30 December 1999. It films and broadcasts live and recorded debates twenty-four hours a day, including committee hearings, questions to the government, and discussions concerning parliamentary debates and government policy. There are programs that focus on different levels of government; some programs are about Europe, others about local government. Linked to Public Sénat from its inception, the two channels share content. The Public Sénat chain also broadcasts a nightly news analysis program and funds and broadcasts documentaries.

== Logos ==
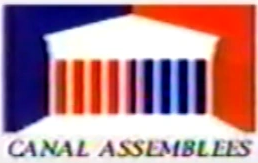
Logo used from 1996 to 1999

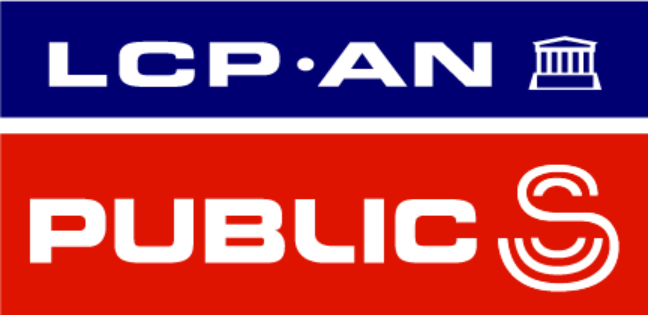
Logo used from 30 December 1999 to 2002

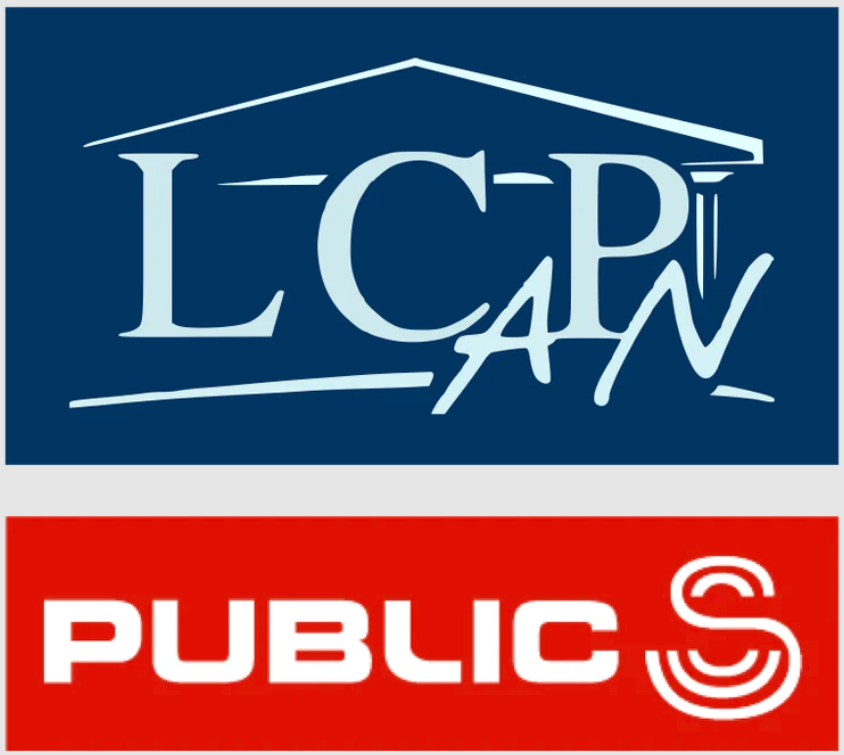
Logo used from 2002 to 2005

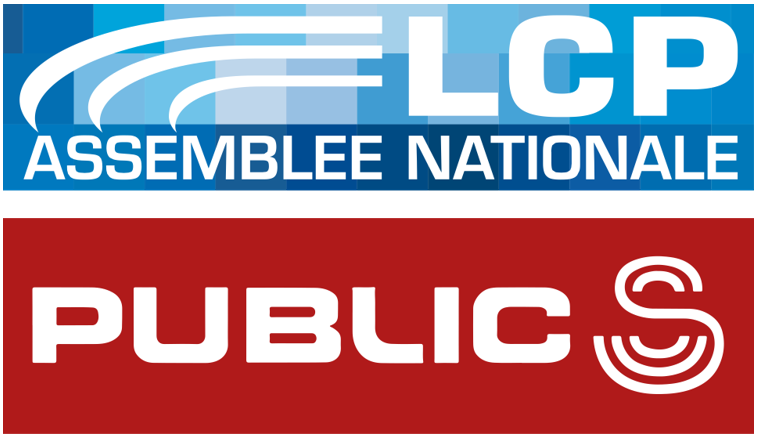
Logo used from 2005 to 2006

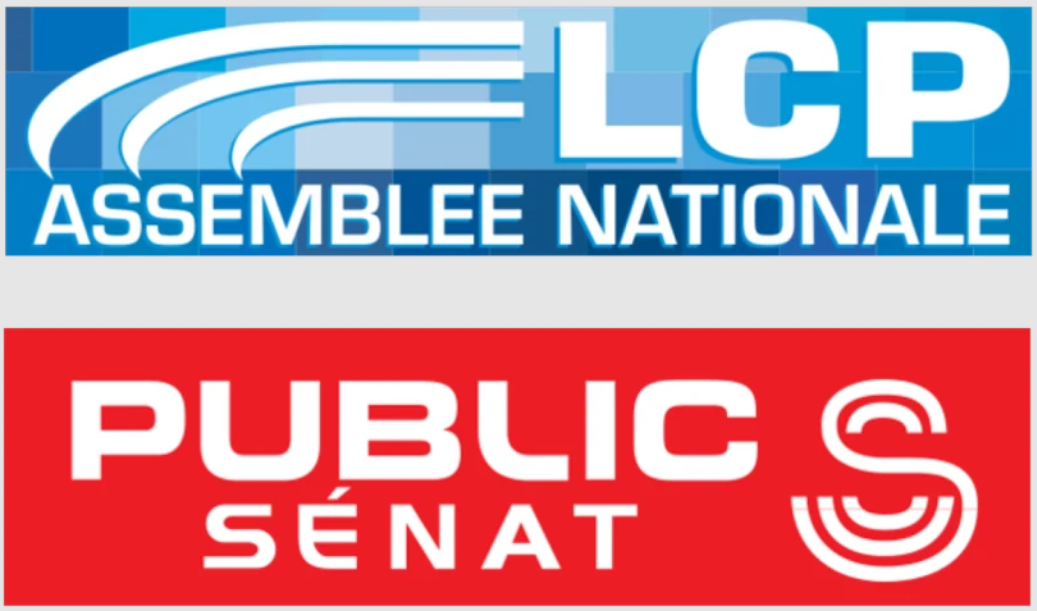
Logo used from 2006 to 2007

Logo used from 2007 to 11 January 2010

== Broadcasting history ==
It started by broadcasting twice a week, Tuesday and Wednesday, in the afternoons on France 3. On 8 February 2000, the channel started broadcasting activity from the Senate of France. On 31 March 2005, the channel obtained its own TNT frequency.

High-definition (HD) broadcasting of the combined LCP/Public Sénat channel started on 1 July 2015 via satellite in the CanalSat mux as an upscaled HD feed. In January 2017 the HD feed was changed from upscaled into native HD (1920x1080).

From June 2025, the channel will move to channel 8, vacated by C8, which got stripped of its terrestrial broadcasting license. The move came as part of a realignment to the terrestrial platform determined by Arcom on 13 January 2025.
