= Sport+ (French TV channel) =

Sport+ (France)
- Country: France
- Broadcast area: France
- Headquarters: Issy-les-Moulineaux, France

Programming
- Language: French
- Picture format: 576i (16:9 SDTV)

Ownership
- Owner: Canal+ Group

History
- Launched: 23 December 1996; 29 years ago (original); 9 October 2026; 6 days ago (relaunch)
- Closed: 27 June 2015; 11 years ago (original)
- Former names: AB Sports (1996-1999), Pathé Sport (1999-2002)

Links
- Website: www.sport-plus.fr

Sport+ is a French cable television channel on cable and satellite owned by Canal+ and is devoted to live sports broadcasting.

== History ==
The channel originally launched on 23 December 1996 as AB Sports. AB Sports was created by AB Groupe to be the sports channel of its AB Sat satellite package.

However, the channel was too expensive for AB Groupe to run and had generated poor viewing figures because of its programming focusing heavily on foreign sports. AB Groupe sold 51% of the capital of AB Sports for 39 million France to Pathé, then launched thematic television channels. Pathé eventually renamed the channel under their own branding, to Pathé Sport in May 1999, with its programming focusing more on the French public, which made the channel gain some notoriety due to that, the live coverage of sport events and the variety of sports they offered.

The acquisition of Eurosport France by the TF1 Group at the beginning of 2001 and the subsequent decision of the Canal+ Group to launch a new sports channel in the autumn of 2002, created a more competitive context in the sports rights market which jeopardized the development plan by Pathé Sport. Pathé sold 60% of the channel's capital in March 2002 to Canal+ Group, and eventually the remaining 40% on 26 October of the same year, in exchange for 80% of the capital of Télé Monte Carlo. The operation allowed Canal+ Group to get back a sports channel it had lost since the absorption of Eurosport France, of which it was a shareholder, by TF1 S.A.. The channel again changed its name to Sport+ on 26 October 2002.

When beIN Sports launched in the country in 2012 and took over various events Sport+ used to have rights to, the channel started to struggle behind this new competition. It eventually ceased broadcasting on 27 June 2015.

On October 7, 2026, Canal+ announced the return of Sport+ on October 9 at 7 a.m., more than ten years after the channel had ceased broadcasting, as a new, free, all-digital channel.

== Programming ==
In its final year of operations, Sport+ broadcast the German Bundesliga, Italian Serie A, Major League Soccer, Brazilian Serie A, UEFA Euro 2016 qualifying, 2018 FIFA World Cup qualification (football), Davis Cup, Fed Cup and French ATP 250 tournaments (tennis), French Pro D2, Super Rugby, The Rugby Championship, Currie Cup and ITM Cup (rugby union), LNB Pro A and Liga ACB (basketball), GP2 Series, World Rally Championship and Formula E (motorsport), PGA Tour, European Tour and Ryder Cup (golf), French women's handball championship, National Hockey League, and UCI cycli-cross, BMX, track cycling and women's road cycling.

The channel previously covered the Wimbledon Championships, ATP World Tour Finals and ATP Masters 1000 (tennis), National Football League, National Basketball Association, UEFA Europa League (football), English Premiership Rugby, EHF Champions League and LNH Division 1 (handball) and UCI road cycling. However, beIN Sports eventually took over those events and is one of the reasons given for the channel's closure.
