= AB4 =

Belgian television channel

- Country: Belgium
- Broadcast area: Belgium
- Headquarters: Brussels, Belgium

Programming
- Language: French
- Picture format: 576i (16:9 SDTV)

Ownership
- Owner: AB Groupe
- Sister channels: AB3

History
- Launched: 28 October 2002; 23 years ago
- Closed: 13 September 2017; 8 years ago
- Replaced by: ABXplore

AB4 was a Belgian broadcast television station owned and operated by BTV, a subsidiary of AB Groupe. It targeted the French community in Belgium. On September 13, 2017, at 20:30 it became ABXplore.

== History ==
Claude Berda, CEO of the French AB Groupe, launched AB4 in October 2002 without authorization from the French Community of Belgium to broadcast its new channel over its territory. He had obtained the authorization of the French Superior Audiovisual Council on 24 September 2002 to activate a dormant operating license existing since 26 March 1996 (amended 24 March 1998) on the AB30 service. On the basis of the European Television Without Borders Directive, a channel which has been granted a license to operate in a European State may be broadcast unhindered in all other Member States, provided that the content broadcast is the same as in the origin.

The AB4 signal was transmitted from France to the Eutelsat satellite system which forwards it to the headquarters of the association of Belgian French-speaking teledistributors who then provides it to contracted networks.

AB4 has been licensed by the Higher Audiovisual Council of the French Community of Belgium since 23 September 2003.

Since the beginning of 2007, the AB3 and AB4 content have been broadcast from the headquarters of AB Groupe in La Plaine Saint-Denis in the Paris suburbs where it creates greater synergy between groups and reduce staff costs in Belgium in the face of an average audience. The diffusion is made between the two countries via digital technologies. This decision would not be foreign to the entry of the TF1 group into the capital of AB Group.

Since May 2009, the TF1 Group has grown from 33.5% to 49% in the Holding WB, which manages the AB3, AB4, and Vidéoclick3 channels.

Philippe Zrihen, Program Director, said in 2010 at tuner.be: "It is under study. It was necessary to go through a hierarchy of priorities, and quite naturally AB3 imposed itself in the recasting. AB4 has not changed its editorial line. This is something we are also considering."

Since March 22, 2010, AB4 shares its antenna with "AB shopping" devoted to tele-shopping. Subsequently, from October 8, 2011, the latter takes a greater place in the AB4's schedule by being broadcast from 8:00 pm to 4:00 pm: AB4 only broadcasts 4 hours of programs.

On April 28, 2011, at 1:00 pm, AB4 switched to 16:9 format. On August 11, 2015, the channel ceased satellite broadcasting (Hotbird 13).

On September 13, 2017, the AB group decided to rename the AB4 chain by becoming ABXplore, and reformat it into a channel devoted to documentaries and entertaining content.
