= 8 Mont-Blanc =

TV8 Mont-Blanc
- Country: France
- Headquarters: Sévrier

Programming
- Language: French
- Picture format: 4:3 SDTV

History
- Launched: 1989
- Former names: 8 Mont-Blanc (1989-1997, 2000-2002)

Links
- Website: www.tv8montblanc.fr

Availability

Terrestrial
- TNT: Channel 21

TV8 Mont-Blanc is a Savoie-based local television channel, broadcast on Télévision Numérique Terrestre, cable and satellite.
