= Mangas (TV channel) =

- Country: France
- Broadcast area: France; Switzerland; Belgium; Luxembourg; Monaco; Morocco; Algeria; Tunisia; Lebanon; Madagascar; Mauritius; Overseas France; Haiti
- Headquarters: Paris, France

Programming
- Language: French
- Picture format: 576i (16:9 SDTV); 1080i (HDTV)

Ownership
- Owner: Mediawan Thematics

History
- Launched: 2 April 1996; 30 years ago
- Former names: AB Cartoons (1996–1998)

Links
- Website: www.mangas.fr

Mangas is a French television channel dedicated to airing anime. It has also aired tokusatsu.

== History of the channel ==
AB Cartoons was launched in 1996 as a youth channel on the AB Sat package. It showed Japanese animation (anime) already shown on Club Dorothée on TF1.

Due to the popularity of the genre with young adults and teens as well as criticism of the violence shown in the programmes, the channel was renamed Mangas, on 1 September 1998 using the logo of the magazine D.MANGAS (the former Dorothée Magazine, although the show on TF1 had ended in 1997).

On February 15, 2011, the channel switched to 16:9 format. During the first few weeks after this change, programs in 4:3 format remain in their original format, before being quickly displayed in 14:9 format.

Since October 2013, the channel has been broadcasting anime the day after its diffusion in Japan to compete with the newly created channel J-One.

== Organisation ==
=== Managers ===
President :

- Jean-Michel Fava

Vice-President :

- Claude Berda

Director of programmes :

- Richard Maroko

Director of Marketing and Business Development :

- Gregg Bywalski

Editor :

- Pierre Faviez

=== Budget ===
Mangas is owned by AB Sat SA with a budget of €24 million, provided 100% by AB Groupe.

== Programmes ==
The programming of the channel is mostly reruns of classic series from the Club Dorothée era, such as Fist of the North Star, Ranma ½, Moero! Top Striker and Dragon Ball and Dragon Ball Z. However, the channel also shows original programming such as One Piece and Wolf's Rain shown in their original version.

Eventually, Mangas also aired several new programs which are now cancelled, such as Galaxie Mangas (hosted by Olivier Ligné and Olivier Fallaix) from 2000 to 2003, Défi Mangas a showcase of short films by young directors, and Mangas à la carte, a program where viewers could vote for the way they wished the series to develop.

Today, the channel is the only French channel with a bimonthly news magazine entirely dedicated to the world of manga, (paper manga, anime, video games, etc.), which has been broadcast since September 2004 : Actu Mangas. The magazine is co-written by Mylène Patou (for manga) and Cédric Derancourt (for video games) who is also in charge of programming for the channel. The show is also shown in a shortened version on NT1.

== Broadcast ==
Mangas is shown on AB Sat and is also available through a contract on cable and on digital packages from France, Belgium, Switzerland, Luxembourg, Monaco, Francophone Africa, Lebanon, Overseas France and Haiti.

In 2020, the AB channels were removed of StarTimes.

== See also ==
- Club Dorothée
