= Ciné First =

- Country: France
- Broadcast area: France

Programming
- Language(s): French
- Picture format: 576i (4:3 SDTV)

Ownership
- Owner: AB Groupe

History
- Launched: 31 December 2007; 17 years ago
- Replaced: Musique classique
- Closed: 30 September 2010; 14 years ago

Links
- Website: Closed

Ciné First was a French television channel, part of the AB Groupe which shows exclusive films, oriented towards an adult audience.

The channel was broadcast on satellite networks Bis Télévisions and AB Groupe. It was also available via ADSL operator Free. The channel occupied the same position as the defunct Cinébox, which broadcast between September 2002 and August 2004.

== History ==
On 31 December 2007 AB Groupe decided to create Ciné Pop for the family and Ciné First to strengthen the cinema offering of the Bis Télévisions satellite package. This one resumed the same dressing and the same thematic positioning as the defunct Ciné Box.

Nevertheless, the channel stopped on various operators on 31 August 2010, with the exception of a few broadcasting the channel until 30 September 2010, since the channel had been abolished because AB Groupe needed space on its transponders to broadcast its new sports channels Golf Channel and Lucky Jack TV on its bouquet.
