= KTO (TV channel) =

French Catholic TV channel

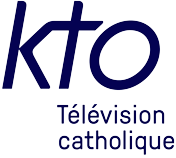
- Country: France

Programming
- Language: French

History
- Launched: December 13, 1999
- Founder: Jean-Marie Lustiger; Jean-Michel Di Falco

Links
- Website: KTO TV

KTO is a French-language Catholic television channel. It is broadcast in France, Belgium, and Switzerland, as well as francophone countries in the Middle East and sub-Saharan Africa.

== History ==
The channel was founded in 1999 by Jean-Marie Lustiger, who served as the Archbishop of Paris from 1981 to 2005. It is privately funded by 250,000 donors.

Programs have included documentaries about the Vatican and Christians in Iraq, as well as funny skits.

On 15 June 2019 KTO broadcast the first service live from Notre-Dame (in Paris) since the fire.

== See also ==
- Catholic television
- Catholic television channels
- Catholic television networks
