= Chasse et Pêche =

- Country: France
- Headquarters: 132, avenue du Président Wilson; 93213 La Plaine Saint-Denis

Programming
- Language: French

History
- Launched: May 2, 1996

Links
- Website: www.chasseetpechetv.com

Chasse et Pêche (French for "Hunting and Fishing") is a French television channel dedicated to hunting and fishing.

== History of the channel ==
Created on May 2, 1996, for the AB Sat package, Chasse et Pêche is a channel dedicated to hunting and fishing for sport, and those who enjoy them.

Its rival is the channel Seasons.

=== Capital ===
Chasse et Pêche is owned by AB Sat SA and has a budget of €24 million, provided 100% by AB Groupe.

== Programmes ==
The theme of the channel is all types of fishing and hunting around the world. With 20 hours per day of programming, Chasse et Pêche deals with all those who are interested in the topic, whether professional or amateur, as well as the landscape and nature in which they take place. The programming alternates hourly between hunting and fishing.

=== Shows ===
- Pêche Passion is shown on Tuesday and Wednesday at 19:00
- Chasse Passion is shown on Monday and Thursday at 18:30
- Destination Pêche is shown on Thursday at 19:00
- Celtic Nature is shown on Sunday at 19:30

== Broadcast ==
Chasse et Pêche was originally only shown on AB Sat, but is now available through a contract on French, Belgian, and Swiss cable and on the Bis TV packages. Canalsat does not broadcast it, as it is in competition with their channel, Seasons. Chasse & Pêche was made available on Canalsat between 2008 and 2009. On 8 November 2016, at the merger of Canalsat and Les Chaînes Canal+ to form Canal, Chasse et Pêche was added to the Seasons and Crescendo option.

== See also ==
- AB Groupe
