= XXL TV =

French television channel dedicated to pornography and erotica

- Country: France
- Broadcast area: France
- Headquarters: Saint-Denis, France

Programming
- Language(s): French
- Picture format: 4:3 (576i, SDTV)

Ownership
- Owner: Thematic Netherlands BV

History
- Launched: March 1996; 29 years ago
- Former names: XXL (1996-2024)

Links
- Website: www.xxltv.fr

XXL is a television channel in France that is dedicated to pornography and erotica. Created in March 1996 and transmitted by the AB Sat satellite, it was at the time the first French channel to broadcast pornography every evening. Nowadays, it is available on every cable and satellite distributor as an option channel.

XXL starts its programming at 22:30 CET with either an erotic film, or a talk show, sometimes hosted by former pornographic film actresses. Starting at midnight, it broadcasts two pornographic films, of which the second is a repeat broadcast from the previous week. It broadcasts a gay movie every Tuesday and an amateur film every Wednesday. At the time of the debate on the protection of the minors with respect to the images in pornographic matter of 2002, the channel was strongly criticized because half of pornographic films on French television, were on this channel.

On 24 December 2013, XXL was sold to Thematic Netherlands BV, an association comprising an AB group executive and the Marc Dorcel (minority shareholder) group is entrusted with the editorial management of the channel and its VOD services.
