= Crime District =

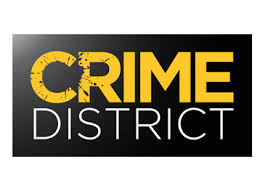
- Broadcast area: France
- Headquarters: Senningerberg, Luxembourg

Programming
- Language(s): French
- Picture format: 576i (16:9 SDTV)

History
- Launched: 11 February 2016; 9 years ago

Links
- Website: www.crimedistrict.tv

Crime District is a French television channel from Luxembourg broadcasting news reports and criminal investigations. It belongs to AB Groupe via its subsidiary AB Luxembourg S.A..

== History ==
Crime District began broadcasting on February 11, 2016 exclusively in the Orange TV package . The channel is now broadcast on Bis Télévisions as well as on the applications of Molotov TV. Since December 15, 2016, it is also broadcast in Switzerland in the Swisscom TV offer.
