= AB3 =

Belgium French-language TV station

- Country: Belgium
- Broadcast area: Belgium, Luxembourg, Switzerland

Ownership
- Owner: Mediawan Thematics
- Sister channels: ABX

History
- Launched: 6 October 2001
- Former names: Young TV (pre-launch 2000-2001)

Links
- Website: www.ab3.be

AB3 (Antenne Belge 3) is a private commercial television channel in the French Community of Belgium.

== History ==
Former logo used until from 2004 to 2009

In 1995, audiovisual consultants André Kemeny and Xavier Debatty applied for a broadcasting licence in the French Community of Belgium with Laurette Onkelinx, Minister-President of the Government of the French Community. In August 2000, the company Youth Channel Television was officially created to operate the new television project. In March 2001 the government of the French Community agreed that YTV could broadcast in its territory, but asked that the English name of the project ("Young TV") be changed to a French name. YTV changed its name to AB3 ("Antenne Belge 3") a reference to the AB Groupe, holder of a 25% stake in it.

On 6 October 2001 at 18:30, AB3 began broadcasting on cable networks to the French Community of Belgium.

The competitors are the channels of RTBF and RTL Group.
