= Action (French TV channel) =

French television channel

- Country: France
- Headquarters: La Plaine Saint-Denis, France

Programming
- Language(s): French
- Picture format: 576i (16:9 SDTV); 1080i (HDTV)

Ownership
- Owner: Mediawan Thematics

History
- Launched: 2 May 1996; 28 years ago

Links
- Website: www.actiontv.fr

Availability

Terrestrial
- Easy TV (Congo): Channel 25

Action is a French television channel which shows action films.

== History ==
A TV channel dedicated to films (cinema and telefilm) in the action genre, was commercially launched as part of the AB Sat package in 1996.

It is also the name of a channel of the Starz Encore Group in Canada.

=== Budget ===
Action is run by AB Sat SA with a budget of €24 million, provided 100% by AB Groupe.

== Programming ==
- Lucha Underground

Season 4 is being broadcast in 2019, narrated by Marc Chavet and Jerome Pourrut.

- WWE NXT

== Broadcast ==
Action is broadcast on the "Ciné-Séries" bouquet of Canal+ and the "Cinérama" (now "Panorama" in satellite) bouquet from Bis Télévisions, on cable, and on ADSL.

It ceased transmissions on StarTimes in 2020.

== See also ==
- AB Groupe
