= Toute l'Histoire =

- Country: France
- Headquarters: 132, avenue du Président Wilson; 93213 La Plaine Saint-Denis

Programming
- Language: French
- Picture format: 16:9 (1080i, HDTV)

History
- Launched: 2 April 1996
- Former names: La Chaîne Histoire (1996–2000)

Links
- Website: www.toutelhistoire.com

Toute l'Histoire is a French television channel based on historical documentaries.

== History ==
La Chaîne Histoire was created in April 1996.

AB Groupe renamed the channel Toute l'Histoire in 2002.

== See also ==
- AB Groupe
