= Canal+ (streaming service) =

French streaming service and subscription satellite provider

- Logo used since 1995

- Screenshot of Canal+ Austria's English website in December 2024
- Former names: Canalsatellite (1992–2005); Canalsat (2005–2016); Canal (2016–2019, for the satellite provider) myCanal (2013–2023, for the OTT platform)
- Website type: OTT streaming platform
- Predecessor: TPS
- Headquarters: Paris
- Country of origin: France
- Area served: Europe, Africa, Oceania, Myanmar and Vietnam
- Industry: Entertainment; mass media
- Products: Streaming media; video on demand; digital distribution
- Services: Film production; film distribution; television production; television distribution
- Parent: Canal+ S.A.
- Website: www.canalplus.com
- Commercial: Yes
- Registration: Required
- Users: ▲26.8 million (as of December 19, 2024)
- Launched: 14 November 1992; 33 years ago (as a digital satellite provider); 1 December 2013; 12 years ago (as a streaming service)
- Current status: Active
- ASN: 29264

Canal+ is a French subscription video on-demand over-the-top streaming service and subscription TV provider. The TV provider was established as CanalSatellite in 1992 and later rebranding to CanalSat and the streaming service was launched as myCanal in 2013. It is a subsidiary of Canal+ S.A.

== History ==
=== CanalSat (pay TV provider) ===
Digital satellite provider CanalSatellite was launched as a wholly owned subsidiary of Groupe Canal+ on 6 December 1991. The shareholders were Canal+ (66 percent) and Lagardère Active (34 percent), a subsidiary of Lagardère. Canal+ began satellite broadcasting in 1992, to reach parts of France not covered by cable.

On 27 April 1996, CanalSatellite launched as a digital satellite platform, with 24 channels and interactive services.

On 23 May 2005, CanalSatellite was renamed Canalsat.

With Canal+, the utilisation of the card pairing (QEV) technology allowed access to many channels such as Eurosport, Paris Premiere, or LCI.

On 31 August 2006, after acquiring competitor TPS, the two companies were merged within the Canal+ Group.

On 7 December 2010, both Canal+ channels and the 90 CanalSat channels became available live on Microsoft's Xbox 360.

In 2011, the merger with TPS was cancelled by the Competition Authority. Canal+ appealed, and the Authority determined that its authorisation would be conditional on a number of injunctions, including "re-establish[ing] sufficient competition in the pay television market".

=== 2013: launch of myCanal (streaming service) ===
In December 2013, CanalSat and Canal+ launched their subscription video on-demand over-the-top streaming service "myCanal".

In September 2015, Vincent Bolloré announced that the service would change its name to simply "Canal". CanalSat adopted the new name on 15 November 2016, accompanied by new offerings, merging with the bouquet Les Chaînes Canal+.

In 2017, Canal lost Discovery and NBCUniversal channels, recovered by SFR. Canal replaced them by exclusive newly launched channels: Warner TV, Polar+, and Novelas TV.

=== 2019: Canal (formerly CanalSat) and myCanal becomes Canal+ ===
The service was renamed Canal+ on 1 August 2019, unifying its brand across the world. In September 2019, Canal+ offered a new upgrade of its subscription package "Canal+ Ciné Séries" which included Netflix. Disney+ was included from its launch on 7 April 2020 for all Ciné Séries subscribers, and similar upgrades were proposed for Paramount+ and HBO Max where Canal+ is their main partner in France.
