= Television in Luxembourg =

On 23 January 1955 the privately owned Compagnie Luxembourgeoise de Télédiffusion (CLT) launched Luxembourg's first television channel, the French-language Télé Luxembourg.

CLT had on 1 July 1954 changed its name from the earlier Compagnie Luxembourgeoise de Radiodiffusion (CLR), founded in 1931.

In 1997, CLT merged with the Bertelsmann subsidiary UFA Film- und Fernseh GmbH, based in Hamburg, Germany, to create CLT-UFA.

In 2000, CLT-UFA merged with Pearson Television and became part of the RTL Group, with its headquarters at Kirchberg, Luxembourg.

== History ==
Télé Luxembourg was inaugurated by Grand Duchess Charlotte of Luxembourg on her 59th birthday together with her husband Prince Felix of Bourbon-Parma. The transmitter used was that at Dudelange, adapted for television broadcasting.

In 1980 the station added the prefix RTL to its name to become RTL Télé Luxembourg. It continued with this name until 1982 when it became RTL Télévision. The station was receivable in Belgium until 11 September 1987 when the transmitting frequency used was given up to RTL-TVI and continued for Luxembourg and French viewers until March 1991 when it then became RTL TV which had one variant in Lorraine known as RTL Lorraine, which lasted only until September 1991. Because of internal conflicts between the older and younger generations, who could not agree on the re-organisation of the station, RTL TV passed on its public service in Luxembourg on 21 October 1991 to RTL Hei Elei, it kept this name until the autumn of 2001 when it was renamed RTL Télé Lëtzebuerg, and it was joined by a second national station in 2004, Den 2. RTL which is now RTL Zwee.

== Programming in Luxembourgish ==
Programming in the Luxembourgish language was inaugurated on 21 September 1969 with the launch of the weekly 45-minute "Hei Elei, Kuck Elei" (roughly translatable as: "Hey there, look at this"), which was broadcast every Sunday until 1991.

== Technologies ==
=== Cable ===
95% of households are connected to a cable provider.

The major cable companies in Luxembourg are:

- Eltrona (in French) Tel: 49 94 66 888
- SFR Luxembourg (in French)
- PostTV Luxembourg
- Orange Luxembourg (100% owned by Orange Belgium)
- Tango (Owned by Belgian Telecom company Proximus Group)

=== Satellite ===
The Société Européenne des Satellites (SES) was formed on the initiative and with the support of the Luxembourg government in 1985. The company is based in the historic Betzdorf Castle, which it acquired in 1986. In 1988 SES became the first European satellite provider when it launched the Astra 1A satellite. RTLplus, a station which had started in Luxembourg but moved its headquarters to Cologne in January 1988, was present for the launch on 8 December 1989.

=== Terrestrial ===
==== DVB-T (Digital Terrestrial) reception ====
The following stations are broadcast using the DVB-T system from the transmitter at Dudelange Radio Tower (Ginsterberg):

- RTL Télé Lëtzebuerg (Channel 27)
- RTL Zwee (Channel 27)
- RTL-TVI (Belgium) (Channel 24)
- Club RTL (Belgium) (Channel 24)
- Plug RTL (Belgium) (Channel 24)
- RTL 4 (Netherlands) (Channel 24)
- RTL 5 (Netherlands) (Channel 24)
- RTL 7 (Netherlands) (Channel 24)
- RTL 8 (Netherlands) (Channel 21)

==== DVB-T Hotline ====
Telephone number : 42142 7373

==== DVB-T Frequency allocation ====
DVB-T Network coverage in Luxembourg:

- Channel 21 (474 MHz) from Dudelange at 100 kW
- Channel 24 (498 MHz) from Dudelange at 40 kW
- Channel 27 (522 MHz) from Dudelange at 180 kW
