= Languages of Luxembourg =

- Official: Luxembourgish, French, German
- Foreign: English, Portuguese, Italian
- Signed: German Sign Language
- Keyboard layout: Swiss QWERTZ

The linguistic situation in Luxembourg is characterized by the practice and the recognition of three official languages: French, German, and the national language Luxembourgish, established in law in 1984. These three languages are also referred to as the three administrative languages, as the constitution does not specify them as being "official". As of 2018, 98% of the population was able to speak French at more or less a high level (usually as a second language), 78% spoke German, and 77% Luxembourgish (which is the most common native language).

Upon the founding of the country, French enjoyed the greatest prestige, and therefore gained preferential use as the official and administrative language. German was used in the political field to comment on the laws and the ordinances in order to make them comprehensible to everyone. At the primary-school level, teaching was limited to German, while French was taught in secondary education. The law of 26 July 1843 reinforced bilingualism by introducing the teaching of French in primary school.

== History of language policy ==
German-French bilingualism dates back at least to the 12th century, when the territory of the Duchy of Luxembourg spread over the traditional Germano-Romance language border. The population comprised roughly equal numbers of Romance- and Germanic-speakers. Later, Burgundian, Spanish, Austrian and French rule favoured the use of French. Also after 1815, under William I of the Netherlands, French was preferred to counter the expansion of Prussia. However, after the Belgian Revolution, language policy changed in favor of German while French was maintained. Further, by 1839, Luxembourg had lost its Walloon and hence native French-speaking areas, so that nowadays, the dialectal foundation of the country is only Germanophone.

== Luxembourgish ==
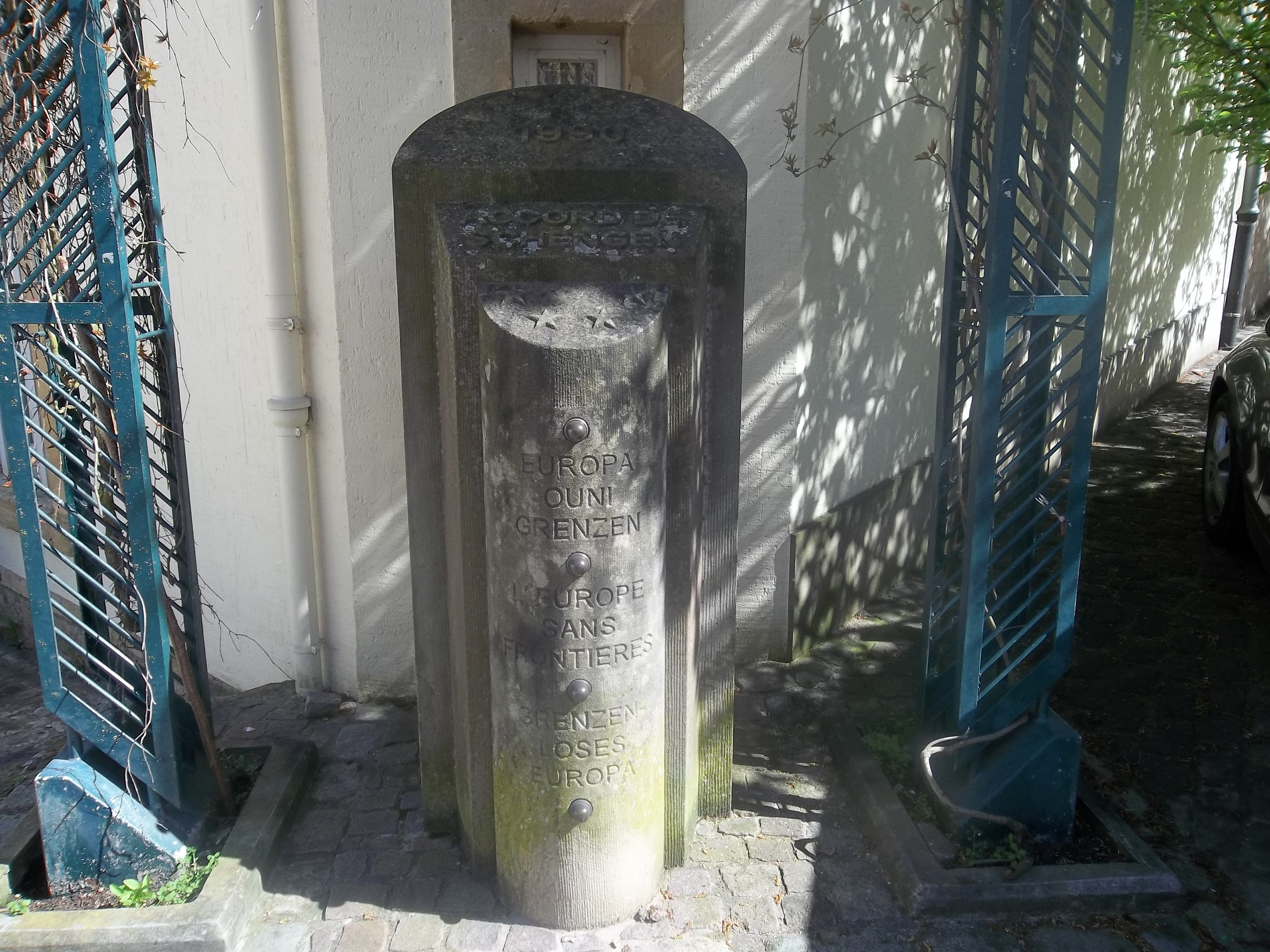
Memorial to the Schengen Agreement in Luxembourgish, French, and German

Luxembourgish (Lëtzebuergesch), a Rhinelandic language of the Moselle region similar to German and Dutch, was introduced in primary school in 1912. It is similar to Moselle-Frankish dialects like the dialects in Germany bordering Luxembourg, and the dialects in Moselle, France. Unlike its German counterparts, it uses many French loanwords and is recognized as a separate language rather than a German dialect. The formalization of regional German dialects into national languages arose from the desire to express a distinct national identity, not associated with the German state. In Switzerland, written German was maintained, albeit with some differences in vocabulary, which differed significantly from the spoken Swiss-German speech that the average German cannot understand. In Luxembourg, the dialect was phonetically transcribed into a new language, and while Luxembourgish and a mix of other languages is spoken on the street, French is often the main language spoken next to German and sometimes Luxembourgish in shops or other commercial sites.

The first printed sentences in Luxembourgish appeared in 1821 in a weekly journal the Luxemburger Wochenblatt. The first book in Luxembourgish was released in 1829 by Antoine Meyer: E' Schrek ob de' Lezeburger Parnassus. Until the 1980s, the language had been used mainly for poetry and drama but has since become increasingly popular for fiction which now represents a significant contribution to Luxembourgish literature. Between 2000 and 2002, Luxembourgish linguist Jerome Lulling developed a lexical database of 185,000 word forms for the first Luxembourgish spellchecker, thus launching the computerization of the Luxembourgish language.

== Constitutional revision ==
Until 1984, the official use of the languages was based on the grand-ducal decrees of 1830, 1832 and 1834, which allowed the free choice between German and French. French was preferred in the administration. Luxembourgish had no official status at all.

The constitutional revision of 1984 gave the legislature the power to regulate the language by law. On February 24, 1984, a law, passed by the Chamber of Deputies, made Luxembourgish the national language. Furthermore, this law recognizes the three languages of Luxembourg (Luxembourgish, French and German) as administrative languages. French remains the language of legislation, due to the application of the Napoleonic Code in Luxembourg.

== Participation in German and French language councils ==
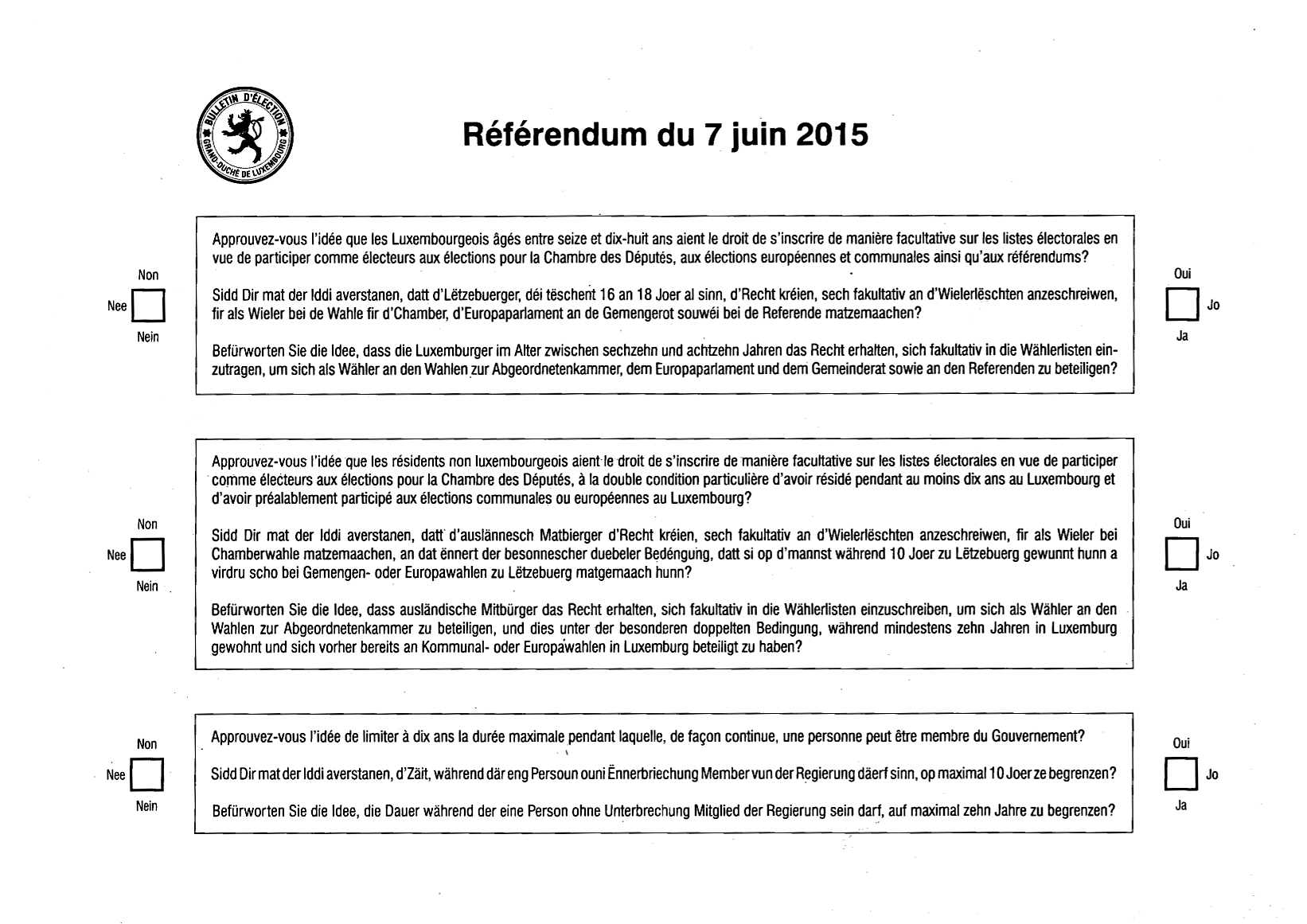
Ballot for the 2015 referendum written in French, Luxembourgish and German

Despite having German as one of its official languages, Luxembourg, which was not involved in devising the German orthography reform of 1996, is merely a non-voting observer in the Rat für deutsche Rechtschreibung (Council for German Orthography). The government of Luxembourg unilaterally adopted the reform and, due to its efficiency, it is well-accepted by the country's teachers. According to the Grand Duchy's largest newspaper, the Luxemburger Wort, Luxembourg does not perceive itself as a "German-speaking country" (the only national language is Luxembourgish) and thus had no right to take part in the council. Despite this, Luxembourg takes part in the annual meetings of German-speaking countries.

Luxembourg does however fully participate in the Francophonie, despite French only being an official, and not national, language. This might be due to the fact that Francophonie as an organization seeks to promote the use of the French language around the world, rather than regulate it, and thus includes many members that are not French-speaking, such as Romania and Greece.

== Education ==
Luxembourgish is taught at pre-primary level, there is an introductory program in French since 2017/18. When Luxembourgish children are first taught to read and write in public schools, it is in German. The language of instruction in public primary school is German. Moreover, Luxembourgish is taught only one hour per week at secondary school and only in the first years. In secondary school, besides German, French and Luxembourgish, English is taught. Optionally Latin, Spanish and/or Italian in the Lycée Classique where most subjects are taught in French after 4e. At the university level, multilingualism makes it possible for Luxembourgish students to continue their higher education in French, German or English-speaking countries.

== Press, police, public services ==
German and French are the primary languages for public service information. German is the main language of the written press and for recording police case files.

== Other languages ==
Foreign-born people and guest workers make up almost half (47%) of the population of Luxembourg. The most common languages spoken by them, other than German and French, are Portuguese, English and Italian.

In addition to Luxembourgish, French, and German, English is frequently an acceptable language for use in and with government services.

== Census data ==
According to 2021 census data, 48.9% of citizens claimed Luxembourgish as their main language, 15.4% Portuguese, 14.9% French, 3.6% English, 3.6% Italian, 2.9% German and 10.8% different languages (the most spoken ones being Spanish, Arabic, Dutch, Russian, Polish and Romanian).

Main language	2011 census		2021 census	
Main language	Absolute	%	Absolute	%
Luxembourgish	265,731	55.8%	275,361	48.9%
Portuguese	74,636	15.7%	86,598	15.4%
French	57,633	12.1%	83,802	14.9%
English	10,018	2.1%	20,316	3.6%
Italian	13,896	2.9%	20,021	3.6%
German	14,658	3.1%	16,412	2.9%
Spanish	—	—	6,473	1.1%
Arabic	—	—	3,904	0.7%
Dutch	—	—	3,661	0.7%
Russian	—	—	3,325	0.6%
Polish	—	—	3,251	0.6%
Romanian	—	—	3,092	0.5%
Chinese	—	—	2,855	0.5%
Serbian	—	—	2,736	0.5%
Bosnian	—	—	2,601	0.5%
Greek	—	—	2,485	0.4%
Other languages	40,042	8.4%	26,199	4.7%
Total	476,614	100%	563,092	100%

== Eurobarometer data ==
The following tables list the percentage of inhabitants who are able to speak one of the three official languages (+ English) natively or as a second language according to the EU Eurobarometer polls.

2023	Luxembourgish	French	German	English	other
Native language	▼38%	▲17%	▲7%	▲3%	▲48%
Second language	▲28%	▼77%	▼59%	▲68%	—N/a
Combined	▼66%	▼94%	▼68%	▲71%	▲48%

2012	Luxembourgish	French	German	English	other
Native language	▼52%	▲16%	▼2%	▲2%	▲30%
Second language	▲18%	▼80%	▼69%	▼56%	—N/a
Combined	▼70%	96%	▼71%	▼56%	▲30%

2005	Luxembourgish	French	German	English	other
Native language	77%	6%	4%	1%	12%
Second language	13%	90%	88%	60%	—N/a
Combined	90%	96%	92%	61%	12%

== See also ==
- Constitution of Luxembourg
- Multilingualism in Luxembourg
- Claims of Luxembourgish being an endangered language
