= RTL Lëtzebuerg =

Television channel in Luxembourg

- Logo used since 2023
- Country: Luxembourg
- Broadcast area: Luxembourg
- Headquarters: 43, boulevard Pierre Frieden Kirchberg, Luxembourg

Programming
- Language: Luxembourgish
- Picture format: 1080i HDTV

Ownership
- Owner: RTL Group
- Sister channels: RTL Zwee

History
- Launched: 21 October 1991; 34 years ago
- Former names: RTL Hei Elei (1991–2001)

Links
- Website: Official website

RTL Lëtzebuerg is the main television channel in Luxembourg, broadcasting in Luxembourgish. It is part of RTL Group.

== History ==
Logo used from 1998 to 2009

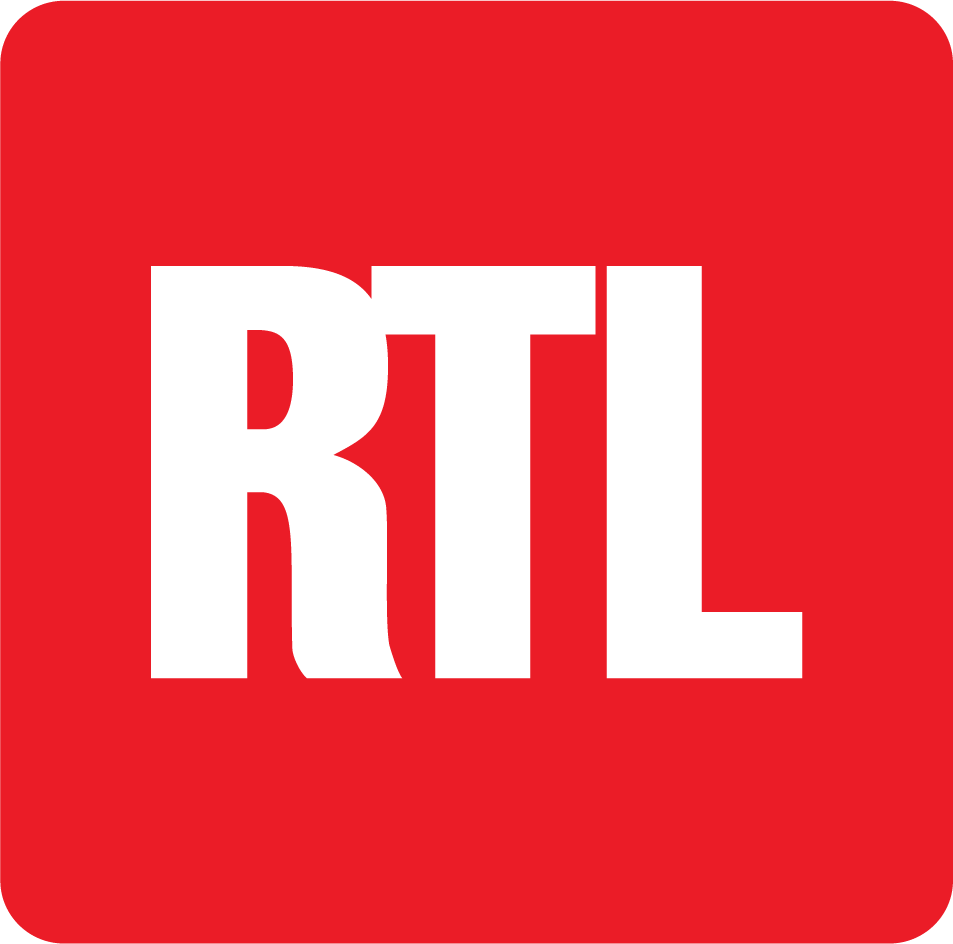
Logo used from 2009 to 2023

The small television market in Luxembourg led to a unique system in Europe: Luxembourg was the only country in the world in which television stations were operated in both the PAL and SECAM formats. Originally, both channels carried the same signal, Tele Luxembourg. Later, the signals were split in the two independent stations RTL-TVI (PAL, system G, on channel 27, the "i" stand for independent), targeting the French-speaking part of Belgium, and RTL Télévision (SECAM, system L, on channel 21), targeting France. Both stations initially continued to carry a lot of the same programming, with regards to foreign series and movies, but produced news and game shows for their target audience.

As restrictions on operating commercial television stations in Europe were relaxed in the mid-1980s, RTL-TVI moved entirely to Brussels, while the popularity of RTL Télévision was somewhat diminished by the success of M6. RTL Télévision was renamed RTL9 and, even though its original terrestrial frequency in Luxembourg remains, it is now primarily a cable station for France.

In 1984, German language RTL Plus (now RTL Television) was added on channel E7 (PAL-B).

All these stations carried a program in Luxembourgish, called Hei elei, kuck elei. The main purpose was to show these stations were essentially broadcasters from Luxembourg and not aiming to be commercial stations in Belgium, France and Germany. When the stations were licensed in their intended broadcasting regions, this program was dropped.

Today, RTL Lëtzebuerg carries entertainment, magazine and news in Luxembourgish. Outside broadcasting hours, a live camera from the radio studio is broadcast, along with text news and traffic cameras. Programs from RTL Shop in French and sometimes German are broadcast a few hours a day, mostly in the morning.

For a few years the station's only competitor was Tango TV, operated by Tele2 from 2002 to 2007. Its main competitors in 2012 are Eldo TV and Den Oppener Kanal (.dok). All other TV stations in Luxembourg only broadcast on a local level (Nordliicht TV in the north or Uelzecht Kanal in the south of the country). RTL also has a second channel, RTL Zwee, with mostly reruns and live sports programmes.

== Broadcast ==
Viewers in Luxembourg can also tune into RTL 4 (channel 41), RTL 5, RTL 7 and RTL 8, which are intended for the Dutch market. Since all these stations have their television licences in Luxembourg, they are available as terrestrial channels. Like television channels in the Netherlands, they show all foreign programming in the original language with subtitles, rather than dubbed.

Since the switch to digital terrestrial television which was implemented overnight on 1 September 2006, RTL Télé Lëtzebuerg and RTL Zwee share channel 27, M6 is on channel 7, and RTL-TVI, Club RTL, Plug RTL, & RTL 4, 5, 7, & 8 are on channel 24.
