= Analog transmission =

Transmission method of conveying voice, data, image, signal or video

Analog transmission is a transmission method of conveying information using a continuous signal which varies in amplitude, phase, or some other property in proportion to that information. It could be the transfer of an analog signal, using an analog modulation method such as frequency modulation (FM) or amplitude modulation (AM), or no modulation at all.

Some textbooks also consider passband data transmission using a digital modulation method such as ASK, PSK and QAM, i.e., a sine wave modulated by a digital bit-stream, as analog transmission and as an analog signal. Others define that as digital transmission and as a digital signal. Baseband data transmission using line codes, resulting in a pulse train, is always considered digital transmission, although the source signal may be a digitized analog signal.

== Methods ==
Analog transmission can be conveyed in many different fashions:

- Optical fiber
- Twisted pair or coaxial cable
- Radio
- Underwater acoustic communication

There are two basic kinds of analog transmission, both based on how they modulate data to combine an input signal with a carrier signal. Usually, this carrier signal is of a specific frequency, and data is transmitted through its variations. The two techniques are amplitude modulation (AM), which varies the amplitude of the carrier signal, and frequency modulation (FM), which modulates the frequency of the carrier.

== Types ==
Most analog transmissions fall into one of several categories. Telephony and voice communication were originally primarily analog in nature, as were most television and radio transmissions. Early telecommunication devices utilized analog-to-digital conversion devices called modulator/demodulators, or modems, to convert analog signals to digital signals and back.

== Benefits and drawbacks ==
The analog transmission method is still very popular, in particular for shorter distances, due to significantly lower costs with complex multiplexing and timing equipment that are unnecessary, and in small "short-haul" systems that simply do not need multiplexed digital transmission.

However, in situations where a signal often has high signal-to-noise ratio and cannot achieve source linearity, or in long distance, high output systems, analog is unattractive due to attenuation problems. Furthermore, as digital techniques continue to be refined, analog systems are increasingly becoming legacy equipment.

As of 2026, more than 70 countries worldwide have transitioned completely to digital television transmissions, starting with Luxembourg in 2005, and the Netherlands in 2006.

== See also ==
- Analog television
- Analog-to-digital converter
- Digital transmission
- Modulation
- Signal
