= RTL9 =

Television station

- Logo used since 2023
- Country: Luxembourg
- Broadcast area: Luxembourg; France; Belgium; Monaco; Switzerland; French Speaking Africa; Lebanon; Overseas France; Haiti
- Headquarters: 2850 Luxembourg City

Programming
- Language: French
- Picture format: 1080i HDTV (downscaled to 576i for the SD feed)

Ownership
- Owner: Mediawan Thematics

History
- Launched: 23 January 1955; 71 years ago
- Former names: Télé-Luxembourg (1955–1972); RTL Télé Luxembourg (1972–1982); RTL Télévision (1982–1991); RTL TV (1991–1995)

Links
- Website: www.rtl9.com

RTL9 is a French-language Luxembourgish television channel shown in Luxembourg, France, Monaco, French Speaking Africa and the French-speaking regions of Switzerland.

== History of the channel ==
=== Télé-Luxembourg ===
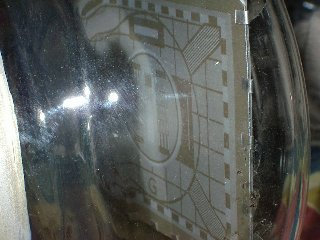
Monochrome Pye Test Card G as seen from a monoscope. Used on Télé-Luxembourg from 1955 until the early-1970s.

On 1 July 1954, CLR (Compagnie Luxembourgeoise de Radiodiffusion) changed their name to CLT (Compagnie Luxembourgeoise de Télédiffusion), to state their new ambition: television. On 20 May 1953, the administrative council of la CLR authorised their president, Robert Tabouis, to sign a contract with the Luxembourg government to run a television channel. They obtained the authority of the Grand Duke to permit a state-run monopoly of the channel.

The achievement of the great works of the Villa Louvigny coincided with the start of the construction of a television antenna at Ginsterberg close to Dudelange, a site which assured good reception, due to its altitude of 430 metres (1,410 ft), and its location only 200 metres (yards) from the French border. The project showed the intention to broadcast eastwards towards France.

On 23 January 1955, the date of her 59th birthday, the Grand Duchess Charlotte I launched Télé-Luxembourg with her husband, Prince Félix, marking the official birth of television in Luxembourg. On screen, a young announcer stated that "Télé-Luxembourg will become a part of your family". The first show consisted of introductions to the channel. At the time no studio had been installed at Villa Louvigny. The shows were directed from the building situated at the foot of the Dudelange Radio Tower. This omni-directional transmitter allowed Télé Luxembourg to be well received at first, with a range of around 150 km (93 mi) around Luxembourg, Ardennes, Lorraine and as far as Reims and Mulhouse. Using a VHF channel of E-07 initially showing programmes at 625 lines, and renamed "canal Luxembourg" in France, the standard was kept at the "Belgium" 819 lines or "819 narrowband" used in Francophone Belgium. It used a narrower bandwidth than Radiodiffusion-Télévision Française (with the result that images appear a little less clear), but have the advantage of being able to cram a greater number of transmitters in the same zone, allowing the channel to be seen by French and Wallonian viewers as well as foreign viewers in Germany, Netherlands, and Dutch-speaking Belgium. They were the first private television channel in Europe. Their mission was to show inter-regional information in French in Luxembourg, Belgium and Lorraine.

Even with the addition of some high-ranking staff from RTF (for which RTF unsuccessfully complained against Tele-Luxembourg), such as Jacques Navadic and Robert Diligent, later of Journal de Télé-Luxembourg, the launch of the channel was hazardous, with few experienced staff, teams consisting of former radio technicians who had moved into television. The productions became more professional and from 1956 to 1957, the CLT built a tower towards the top of Villa Louvigny which became the offices and studios of Télé-Luxembourg. The channel, which was then broadcasting for thirty hours per week, eventually was becoming noticed by the viewing public, and became a part of the audiovisual landscape.

As well as the live programmes, such as L'École Buissonnière, there were reports from around the country and neighbouring Francophone regions on Journal de Télé-Luxembourg, and Télé-Luxembourg delivered key programmes from Paris Productions and foreign films and television series. Little by little, the channel created its identity, and marked its difference from the austerity of the national French and Belgian channels. It was marked out by its sense of levity (gameshows, soaps, and nightly films) and fun (strong presence of French presenters such as Pierre Bellemare and Georges de Caunes and announcers such as Anna-Vera). Advertising was present from the outset, but the presenters themselves delivered the messages live. The popular success was so high that their efforts were recognised by hosting the 7th Eurovision Song Contest in 1962 shown across Europe from the Villa Louvigny. This national event was shown live to every café in the country.

In 1969, the Belgian government moved the frequencies for radio relay to cable. Coditel installed a reception station in the Ardennes at Saint Hubert and broadcast a signal from Télé-Luxembourg via cable from Namur, Brutélé which was distributed to the periphery of Liège and Brussels. From then on, est Belgacom which was then able to sell this on to other television distributors. The development of cable in Belgium, and especially Francophone Belgium, meant that Télé-Luxembourg sat alongside the French channels (TF1, Antenne 2 and FR3). Télé-Luxembourg then drew its main revenue from Belgium.

This family-oriented direction was popular and led Jacques Navadic in the 1970s to become the head of the channel. The programming consisted of films, American serials, gameshows, and chatshows using the same presenters gave Télé-Luxembourg star status in Luxembourg, the East of France and Belgium, reinforced by their move to colour in 1972 : as well as the VHF 819 line transmitter (channel E-07) reconverting to 625 lines SECAM, two new UHF transmitters were launched at the Dudelange Radio Tower, one for channel 21 in SECAM for France, one on channel 27 on PAL for Belgium. Every day, at the start of the channel, the heraldic lion of Luxembourg appeared on the circles symbolising the radio waves and the name Télé-Luxembourg, followed by an image of the Dudelange transmitter, with the voice of Jacques Harvey announcing : "Here is Télé-Luxembourg, channels 7, 21 and 27, Dudelange transmitter, Grand Duchy of Luxembourg.". The game shows soon followed, with Coffre-fort presented by Michèle Etzel, under the slogan Vivement ce soir sur Télé-Luxembourg, and advertising based on car stickers which viewers were encouraged to place in their cars, with these cars then being filmed and broadcast on air.

On 30 July 1981, the Dudelange Radio Tower was totally destroyed after a collision with a Belgian military aircraft, and RTL Télé Luxembourg was off the air for a few hours, until the back-up systems were up and running. The French president, François Mitterrand in person authorised TDF to use the former VHF 819 line transmitters of TF1 in Lorraine to relay RTL Télé Luxembourg in colour until the rebuilding of the tower in Dudelange. However, the 819 line transmitter did not correctly show the programmes. The transmitter at Dudelange was rebuilt in 1983, replaced by an automatic pylon.

RTL Télé Luxembourg created entertainment shows and showed series before any other channels. (It was the first channel in Europe to show Dallas, before even TF1). A regular claim on the channel was that a programme was being broadcast "priority for RTL Television". This policy of "outreach" relied heavily on the personality of the presenters. Jacques Navadic, director of programmes, launched a search for a new presenter in 1977. On a memorable evening, entitled Dix en lice ?, the public, the channel, and a jury of celebrities (Michel Drucker, Jean Lefebvre, Thérèse Leduc, Jacques Navadic, Robert Diligent) chose Marylène Bergmann to become one of the emblematic faces of the channel. A generation of new faces were first seen on the channel: André Torrent, Philippe Goffin, Bibiane Godfroid, Michèle Etzel, Claude Rappé, Anouchka Sikorsky, Jean-Luc Bertrand and Georges Lang.

=== RTL Télévision ===
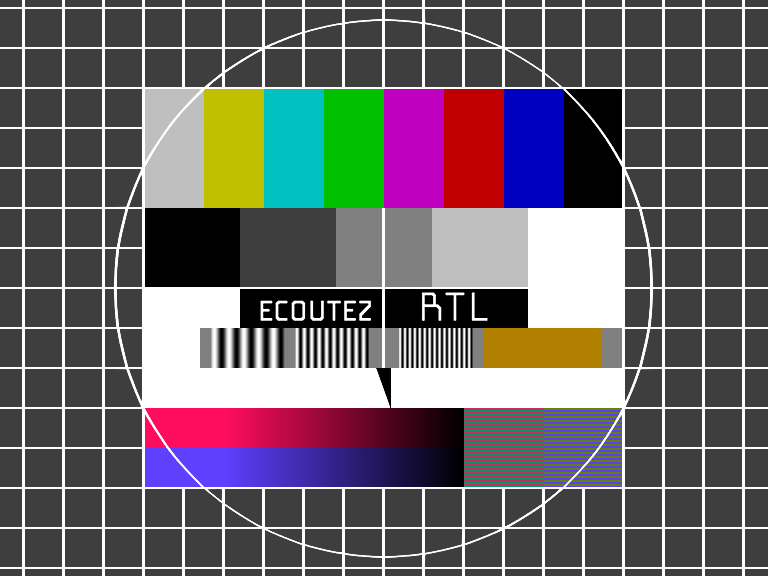
Telefunken FuBK colour test card used by RTL Télévision from 1972 until 1991.

RTL Télé Luxembourg was renamed RTL Télévision in 1982, marking the emergence of the RTL brand. During the 1980s, RTL Télévision had reached their peak. Under the direction of the new programming director, Jean Stock, a clutch of programmes and presenters were successful: Le Train des jouets, Léo contre tous, Citron Grenadine, Tête à Tête, Stop Star, Le Coffre-fort, Fréquence JLB, Atoukado and many presenters.

On 4 March 1983, RTL Télévision launched a microwave between Brussels and Luxembourg. The antenna was split channel between UHF SECAM 21 (Luxembourg / Lorraine) and UHF PAL 27 (Belgium). It allowed the Belgian channel to show Belgian-specific programmes (JTL, presented by Jean-Charles De Keyser and entertainment) alongside programmes for viers in Luxembourg and Lorraine. RTL Télévision then moved to the bottom of Avenue Franklin Roosevelt in Brussels, and built a studio, allowing it to extend its coverage (as part of the compensation package from the Belgian government for the Dudelange accident) to cover all Belgian territory via cable television which meant rapid development in Belgium.

With considerable audience enlargement in Belgium, the channel is finally profitable, and the CLT creates RTL Plus on 2 January 1984 for the German market and shown on the VHF channel E-07, which meant the loss a large part of the French audience of RTL Télévision from the reception zone of channel 21 to Lorraine, to the disappointment of those from Alsace, South-Lorraine, and Champagne-Ardenne, who were no longer able to view the channel. Part of the financial and technical resources of RTL Télévision moved to RTL Plus, while the channel also lost staff in March 1987, when a number of technicians, journalists and presenters took part in the launch of M6, created for the French market (the sixth channel, launched after the collapse of the music channel TV6). In September of the same year, the Belgian channel of RTL Télévision became independent with the launch of RTL-TVi which produced all of its programmes in Brussels. A number of key presenters and creative team of RTL Télévision were involved in these channels. At the same time, the five first cable television channels began broadcast in France.

Deprived of its Belgian audience, and broadcasting to Luxembourg and Lorraine, RTL Télévision was finding great difficulty in positioning itself in the French market. The need for renewal was felt to be essential, and in 1988, RTL Télévision tried to redynamise itself with small touches, such as modifying its logo and graphics (the appearance of the RTL balloon), and signing stars such as Geneviève Guicheney (from FR3) and launching new faces Agnès Duperrin and Martin Igier who had just graduated from the École Supérieure de Journalisme in Lille to replace those who had joined M6 and RTL-TVI. On Christmas Eve 1987, Robert Diligent co-presented his last Journal Télévisé alongside Agnès Duperrin. Those responsible for the channel reorganised the programmes to have a new format which was attractive to the young and more suited to attracting a new audience base. An internal conflict escalated between the old and new generation, which stood in the way of new investment. RTL Télévision abandoned its public service mission in Luxembourg to RTL Hei Elei, a new channel created in Luxembourg at the demand of the government. This was the end of an era.

=== RTL TV ===
To mark the end of the era, RTL Télévision became RTL TV in 1991, becoming the first channel of the CLT Group, while RTL Plus took over the name RTL Television in 1992.

RTL TV changed its format due to the new director of programmes, Hugues Durocher, to attract a younger and more urban public. Films and serials gradually supplemented the traditional programmes and presenters were replaced by a new generation: Agnès Duperrin, Laurent Lespinasse, Katia Schmidt, Thierry Guillaume, Nicolas Albrand, Véronique Buson, Jérôme Anthony, Virginie Schanté, Françoise Gaujour, Fabienne Égal and Charlotte Gomez made their first appearances.

The channel aimed to restore the fundamentals of the channel and capitalise on the presenters and launched a vast publicity campaign under the slogan "l'esprit de famille". This slogan was repeated on air by presenters at the key shows on the air: Scrabble RTL with Thierry Guillaume and Véronique Buson, 40 minutes with Marylène Bergmann at the start of the evening, the 52-minute weekly RTL Santé presented by Agnès Duperrin, the female magazine F comme Femmes every lunchtime with Véronique Buson and Françoise Gaujour, the video shows of Music Family and Ligne Basket with Jérôme Anthony and Virginie Schanté and Galaxie with Thierry Guillaume, shown for the youth at the end of the afternoon and Wednesday afternoons and the job show Help!.

Refocussing on the public in Lorraine, RTL TV became more regionalised, and launched RTL Lorraine, which was separated from its big sister on cable and satellite with local shows (40 minutes en Lorraine, and other programmes on cable and satellite on Wednesday evenings) only available to the public in Lorraine via the radio transmitter on Channel 21 from the Dudelange Radio Tower.

=== RTL9 ===
In 1995, RTL TV marked their 40th anniversary with great ceremony in the grand auditorium of Villa Louvigny and officially renamed the channel RTL9 at the end of the night. The official reason for the change of name was a new youth focus to the channel (RTL9, c'est neuf !), but the CLT stated that the move was to avoid confusion with the Belgian channel, RTL-TVI and the German channel RTL Television.

In 1997, the CLT joined with the German audiovisual group UFA and so controlled production, broadcast, and rights for programmes. Faced with their Belgian and German cousins in direct competition in their countries, and with the increasing success of M6 in France, CLT-UFA faced questions regarding their audience in Lorraine and on French and Swiss cable. The new German-Luxembourger group was less attached to the heritage aspect than to the economic aspect of the company and urgent cost-cutting measures were undertaken. In December 1997, the group cut staff at the channel for economic reasons (RTL9 showed a loss of 50 million French francs) and on 3 March 1998, 65% of the capital of the channel was sold to AB Groupe, with CLT-UFA keeping the remaining 35%. A number of viewers deserted the channel, as did some of the key figureheads of the channel, led by Marylène Bergmann, who had been a presenter at the channel since 1977. Only Jean-Luc Bertrand, director of programmes, remained at the channel.

Reaching 650 000 homes on terrestrial channels in Lorraine and Luxembourg, 2.1 million homes via cable in France and Switzerland, 1.5 million via satellite contracts on the TPS satellite package, and via the CanalSat package, RTL9 is the number one channel in terms of relative audience for cable and satellite for the past ten years, and is the third most watched channel in Lorraine. Due to this, AB Groupe proposed that the channel should move to digital terrestrial television in France on 1 July 2002. The CSA refused, since the channel was a foreign channel, and therefore, it was not subject to the same obligations as its French rivals in terms of the broadcast of films and adverts, leading to unfair competition.

In 2005, RTL9 celebrated 50 years of broadcast with archive footage from between 1955 and 2005, but mostly from the RTL9 period, including a musical spectacular from Olympia in Paris presented by Jean-Luc Bertrand. In contrast to RTL-TVI which broadcast a documentary in March 2005 tracing the history of Télé-Luxembourg and the independence of the Belgian channel, or RTL Télé Lëtzebuerg which showed a documentary at the end of 2005 about the "T" in RTL, RTL9 did not show a similar programme, due to the loss of records when they moved offices in 1995. Instead, for the last week of December 2005, the programme of Jean-Luc Bertrand, Bienvenue chez vous, was taken over by former stars of the channel: Michèle Etzel, André Torrent, Jean Stock, Georges Lang and Marylène Bergmann, specially brought in to talk about their professional memories of the history of RTL Télévision.

Since 4 September 2006, RTL9 has renewed its graphic without changing its logo. The new graphic is 3D, created in-house, using the colours and the three shapes which form the channel's logo. A second event took place at the same time: the return of Marylène Bergmann after nine years away, to take over presenting duties on RTL-TVI, two days per week with her old co-presenter Jean-Luc Bertrand, on Bienvenue chez vous on RTL9 Lorraine.

From its foundation as the station of the Grand Duchy of Luxembourg, the RTL empire is still growing now shown in Germany, France, Belgium, the Netherlands, and Eastern Europe, covering 38 television channels and 29 radio stations in 2007.

In May 2008, AB changed RTL9, changing the regional name RTL9 Lorraine to RTL9 Est accompanied by a dedicated website.

In February 2009, AB rejuvenated the website of the channel with an emphasis on video content and the prominence of various departments of AB Groupe.

Since 16 September 2009, RTL9 have a Swiss feed with local ads.

On 1 June 2010, RTL9 passed in 16:9. On 13 May 2014, RTL9 went on high definition on the Canalsat bouquet and in 2015 on Numericable and SFR. The channel is no longer broadcast in standard definition from this date on Astra.

On 21 July 2017, Mediawan, through its audiovisual company AB Groupe, bought the 35% held by CLT-UFA and became its sole owner.

=== Visual identity (logos) ===
Logo used from 2011 to 2023

Logo used since 2023

== Finance ==
From 23 January 1995 to 2 March 1998, RTL9 was wholly owned by CLT SA, which became CLT-UFA SA in 1997. On 3 March 1998 the CLT-UFA Board of Directors decided, under pressure of the Groupe Bruxelles Lambert, to sell 65% of the capital of RTL9 to AB Groupe SA, with 2.25% of the capital held by the Banque Populaire de Lorraine. RTL9 is now 65% owned by AB Luxembourg SA, a wholly owned subsidiary of AB Groupe SA, and 35% by CLT-UFA SA, a 99.7% subsidiary of RTL Group, which bought in 1998 the 2,25% of the Groupe Banque Populaire de Lorraine.

From 21 July 2017, Mediawan becomes the sole owner of the channel by purchasing the shares held by CLT-UFA.

== Organisation ==
=== Managers ===
Presidents:

- Gust Graas :1955–1984
- Jacques Navadic: 1984–1989
- Jean Stock: 1989–1995
- Christophe Chevrier: 1995–1997

Director of broadcast:

- Laurent Altide: since 3 March 1998

CEO:

- Claude Berda: since 3 March 1998

Programme directors:

- Claude Robert: 1955–1975
- Jacques Navadic: 1975–1984 / Jean Stock (Joint directors): 1981–1984
- Jean Stock: 1984–1987
- Hugues Durocher: 1987–1997
- Richard Maroko: since 3 March 1998

Director of programmes and special operations:

- Jean-Luc Bertrand: since 1998

Directors of information:

- Jacques Navadic: 1955–1984
- Jean Stock: 1984–1986
- Hugues Durocher: 1987–1997
- Jean-Luc Bertrand: since 1998

Director of Marketing and Business Development:

- Gregg Bywalski: since 2002

=== Capital ===
RTL9 is owned 97.75% by Mediawan Thematics (who acquired RTL Group's stake in 1998 and 2017), with 2.25% owned by Banque populaire Alsace Lorraine Champagne.

=== Headquarters ===
The first headquarters of Télé-Luxembourg were based at Villa Louvigny in Luxembourg, a building flanked by an eight-storey tower, built in 1956–1957 by the CLT and housing the offices and studios of the channel. This address has become a legendary site in the audiovisual landscape. RTL Télévision and RTL TV stayed until 1990.

RTL Télévision moved to studios at 3, allée Saint-Symphorien, Metz at the end of 1990 to reach the public of Lorraine, but the final parts of the business remained at Villa Louvigny. In summer 1996, the television services at Villa Louvigny moved to new premises of the CLT named KB2 (KB1 was the building of the CLT dedicated to radio), built in Kirchberg, Luxembourg.

As the first cable and satellite channel in France, in 1995 RTL9 had a studio in Paris built at CNIT in la Défense until 1997.

Unfortunately, this move was not a success due to the declining fortunes of the channel, and people and materials were moved back to Metz and Luxembourg in December 1997, when RTL9 sold 65% of its capital to the AB Group.

This was the end of an era, and forty years of viewing was placed into the hands of the administrators.

In December 2005, the regional station left the Technopôle in Metz to move to 29 boulevard Saint-Symphorien, still in Metz.

== Programmes ==
RTL9 today is a TV station without any regional content, and is dedicated to recent cinema releases and to general entertainment consisting of numerous imports of recent popular US TV shows and of programmes from the AB Groupe catalogue.

== Broadcast ==
Transmission of RTL9 on the terrestrial UHF SECAM channel 21 from the Dudelange Radio Tower in the south of Luxembourg to the Lorraine region ended just after midnight on 1 January 2011. On 28 February 2011, digital TV transmission on channel 21 relaunched with a new TV station, "Air, l'autre télé".

RTL TV was shown on Télécom 2B satellite from 1992 until the end of 1994, but encrypted. A payment of 120 French francs was necessary to decrypt the signal via a decoder that costed 690 francs. At the end of December 1996, the new satellite package TPS launched the analogue signal, shown by the Télécom 2B satellite, to be shown via the Hot Bird satellite at 13° east until the start of 1998, when they would begin to broadcast in digital quality. On 26 December 2001, TPS gave up the exclusive rights for the satellite broadcast to RTL9 and the channel was then shown on CanalSat. AB Groupe, which has operated since April 1998, include it in their AB Sat satellite package.

In 2005, AB Groupe proposed to the CSA that the channel could be shown for free on Télévision Numérique Terrestre (TNT). It would have meant making the channel dedicated to "French fiction" and no longer showing films on Wednesday, Friday or Saturday nights, as the showing of films on these evenings is still banned in France. The project did not go forward, but AB got three other frequencies: TMC and NT1 for free-DTT, and AB1 for pay-DTT.

RTL9 is available with Canal+ and Bis Télévisions satellite packages, on Luxembourgish cable, French (Numericable), Swiss (UPC, Naxoo and Net+) and Lebanon (Cablevision), and on ADSL television packages.

It is also available on Molotov.tv and Watch it.

== See also ==
- Radio Télévision Luxembourg
- Dudelange Radio Tower
- Villa Louvigny
- RTL Television
- M6
- RTL-TVI
- RTL Télé Lëtzebuerg
