= Multilingualism in Luxembourg =

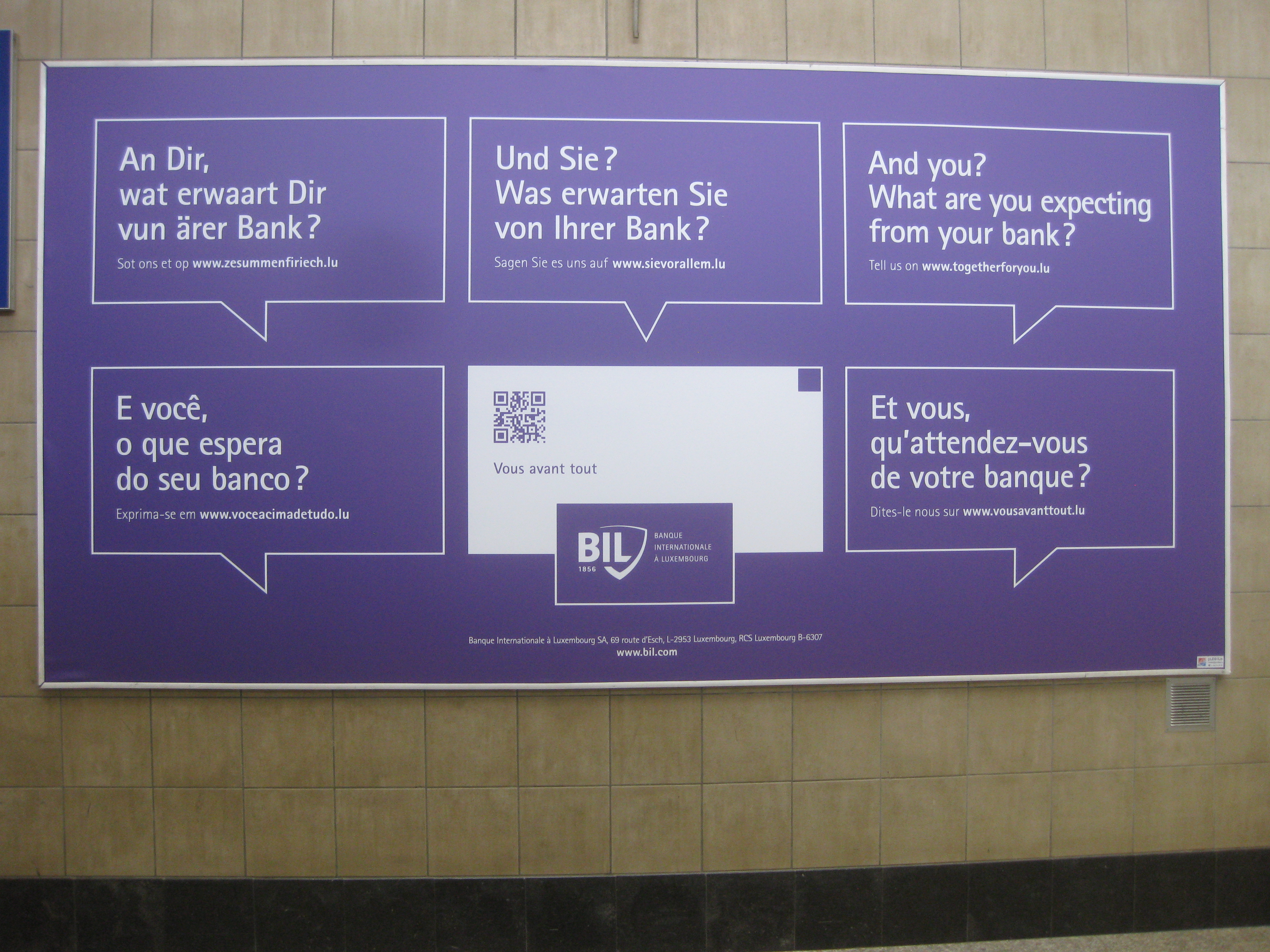
Advertisement from a bank in Luxembourg with translations in (clockwise) Luxembourgish, German, English, French, and Portuguese

Multilingualism is a part of everyday life for the population of Luxembourg. Legally and socially, different sectors of Luxembourg use French, German, and Luxembourgish, which is a variety of Moselle Franconian, partially mutually intelligible with the neighbouring High German but with a large number of loanwords from French. Additionally, most citizens learn English and may study other languages as well. A substantial immigrant population has brought numerous immigrant languages to the small state, notably Portuguese, which is spoken by more than one-fifth of the population. However, the different languages are used in different social situations.

== Official languages ==
The use of languages for legal and administrative purposes is regulated by a law promulgated in 1984, including the following provisions:

- Article 1: The national language of the Luxembourgers is Luxembourgish.
- Article 2: The laws are in French.
- Article 3: The language of the government: Luxembourgish, German and French can be used.
- Article 4: Administrative questions: If a citizen asks a question in Luxembourgish, German or French, the administration must reply, as far as possible, in the language in which the question was asked.

In many other multilingual countries, such as Belgium, Switzerland and Canada, the distribution of the languages is geographic, but in Luxembourg it is functional—that is, the choice of language depends on the situation.

== Education ==
At school, all students are taught in all three official languages, although divided by age group and subject matter. At primary school, the courses are taught in German and explanations are often given in Luxembourgish. In general, at secondary school, up until the 9th grade, every subject is taught in German, except for mathematics and sciences (which are taught in French). From 10th to 13th grade, the language use depends on what level the students are in: In the more difficult level, as well as at the commerce and administrative division, the courses are mostly in French, but throughout the whole of secondary school, explanations are often given in Luxembourgish. The easier level on the other hand tends not to switch to French. As such, Luxembourgers are not able to understand, read, or write French until they are around 8 years old. French always remains a learned (foreign) language for Luxembourgers even though, by the age of 18, the vast majority of them are able to communicate in French on a relatively high level. Due to the high similarity of German to Luxembourgish, and also because German is the first language children are taught (read and write - alphabetization) in school, it is considered by most Luxembourgers their second language, or "reading and writing language".

== Government ==
Government websites are primarily written in French, but are also partially translated into Luxembourgish, German and English. In the Chamber of Deputies, bills are first written in German. Then the language of debate is in Luxembourgish, but sometimes also in French (e.g., when laws are cited). Laws are voted and codified in French.

The website of the Grand Duke of Luxembourg used to be exclusively in French (following redesign it is now available in all three languages plus English) though his personal Christmas speech is done in Luxembourgish (although a French translation is provided). In the Grand Duke's Christmas speech in 2018, he spoke in Luxembourgish for most of the speech, in accordance with tradition. However, when speaking about the importance of foreigners in Luxembourg, he switched to French, as this is the language most widely used by foreign residents.

== Mass media ==
In the written press, most newspapers such as Tageblatt and Lëtzebuerger Journal are in German, while there are a few such as Le Quotidien that are in French. On the other hand, the newspaper of record Luxemburger Wort is trilingual with most articles written in German, but also sometimes written in French and Luxembourgish, often on the same page.

On TV and on the radio, Luxembourgish is mainly used, for example the main news programme RTL's de Journal. Spoken Luxembourgish used in news broadcasts tends to be strongly influenced by standard German in pronunciation and idiom. Radio broadcasters are under pressure to translate news releases sourced from German press agencies in real time and have no special training in the prose style of Luxembourgish. As a result, news tends to be superficially translated into Luxembourgish. Syntax mostly follows standard German and many words and idioms from standard German appear unmodified. Phonology is also affected with the resulting use of intonation phrases alien to Luxembourgish.

=== Advertising ===
In terms of advertising, which language is used depends on three factors: media, audience and origin. In written advertisements like billboards, newspaper and magazine adverts, catalogues and posters, the usual language of communication is French. On occasion to give a local flavour, it is written in part in Luxembourgish. Public signage is usually in French, with occasional markings in Luxembourgish, German and/or English.

For television commercials broadcasting on RTL, if the advert is for an international product or service like a car or a television, it is entirely in French. However, if it is a domestic product or service like for example like Rosport mineral water or Luxair, the spoken language is in Luxembourgish with the taglines in French, or less frequently in Luxembourgish or English.

== Daily use ==
Generally, Luxembourgish is used for most day-to-day life in informal settings throughout the country. Standard German and French are reserved for formal settings and ceremonies. Furthermore, French is commonly used in the hospitality industry. Most newspapers and printed media are in Standard German. Approximately 98% of Luxembourgers can use at least one second language.

== Written Luxembourgish ==
Luxembourgish has a literary tradition that began in the 1820s with the development of serious forms of poetry, followed by drama and eventually narrative prose. However, the average Luxembourger finds Luxembourgish texts difficult to read. Schoolchildren do not read Luxembourgish until the age of 11 or 12. Even then not all teachers adhere to the curriculum requirement to teach written Luxembourgish, some preferring to teach standard German instead, and consequently some students may not be taught written Luxembourgish. As a result, only a minority of literary-minded intellectuals find reading Luxembourgish easy or enjoyable. The majority of Luxembourgers regard their language as a spoken one only. In recent years, the rise of texting and social media has made written Luxembourgish a lot more common between the younger generations.

== See also ==
- Languages of Luxembourg
- Luxembourgish#Endangered status claims
