= Jacques Navadic =

French journalist

Jacques Navadic (3 January 1920 – 2 August 2015) was a Broadcasting editor and journalist who joined Radio Luxembourg in 1955 as Director of information a post in which he stayed until 1984, between 1975 and 1981 he was Programme Director before becoming President of RTL in 1984. He was born in Lille.

For television he worked with Robert Diligent on the show Journal de Télé Luxembourg. He was the regular Luxembourgian commentator of the Eurovision Song Contest between 1966 until 1981 and again in 1984. Navadic retired from RTL Luxembourg in 1989. He died in Nice in 2015.
