= T.TV =

- Type: Cable television network
- Country: Luxembourg
- Availability: National
- Owner: Tele 2
- Key people: Marcus Nylén, President
- Launch date: February 2, 2002
- Dissolved: 2007
- Former names: Tango TV
- Official website: www.ttv.lu

T.TV (initially called Tango TV) was a Luxembourgish satellite, cable, internet, and mobile television channel. It was launched on 2 February 2002 as a competitor to the de facto national broadcaster RTL Télé Lëtzebuerg. The channel was a subsidiary of the Swedish telecommunications company Tele 2 which, at the time, owned the second-biggest mobile phone company in Luxembourg, Tango of which the name comes from.

It was broadcast in Luxembourgish, French and German, but also in English and Portuguese.

TTV stopped broadcasting in 2007.
