= RTL District =

- Country: Belgium
- Broadcast area: Belgium

Programming
- Language: French
- Picture format: 720p HDTV

Ownership
- Owner: DPG Media (50%); Groupe Rossel (50%)
- Parent: RTL Belgium
- Sister channels: RTL-TVI, RTL Club, RTL Plug

History
- Launched: 18 November 2024; 19 months ago

RTL District is a Belgian television channel specialized in true crime programming (reality shows and criminal television series) with seven hours of new programming a day; it is the first Walloon channel to launch in five years.

== History ==
On 6 November 2024, RTL Belgium announced the launch of its fourth channel, RTL District, with the launch date set for 18 November at 16:30. The channel was made available on the five main providers (Proximus, Base TV, Telenet, Orange TV and VOO) from launch. The channel was created due to years of demand for an all-crime network, as the programmes attract a high number of viewers on the main channel.

== Programming ==
The channel is modelled on foreign crime channels, such as the French Crime District. Conceived as "a city under permanent tension", RTL District's aesthetic is centered around a crime-stricken city, with each of the programming blocks representing an individual district:

- Les liens du sang (Blood Ties)
- Les gardiens de la loi (Guardians of the Law)
- Maîtres du crime (Crime Masters)
- Planète police (Police Planet, dedicated to US crime series)
- Quartier des affaires urgentes (Emergency Unit)

Most of its programming consists of reruns of criminal programmes and documentaries produced for the main RTL-TVI channel, such as Un crime parfait, Portraits de tueurs, Appels d'urgence and 112 Helico d'urgence. The daily schedule is built taking into account a block of new programming from 16:30 to 23:30 Mondays to Thursdays and 16:30 to 23:00 Fridays to Sundays. The rest of the schedule consists of reruns, with the last few hours before the evening schedule consisting of highlights of the channel's programming. One notable exception is RTL-TVI's Face au juge, which cannot be seen on RTL District because channel director Julie Denayer, a regular in RTL-TVI's criminal and legal programming, doesn't have the goal of relaying the programme, and also out of respect to some of the people who appeared.

In addition to the Belgian output, the channel airs US crime series Law & Order: Special Victims Unit, Criminal Minds and CSI: Crime Scene Investigation.

Starting from February 2025, RTL District broadcasts a live stream of the newly created Contact Max radio station during off-hours.
