= RTL Zwee =

Television station

- Country: Luxembourg
- Broadcast area: Luxembourg

Programming
- Language(s): Luxembourgish, French, German

Ownership
- Owner: RTL Group
- Sister channels: RTL Télé Lëtzebuerg

History
- Launched: 15 March 2004; 21 years ago
- Former names: Den 2. RTL (2004–2020)

Links
- Website: www.rtl.lu/tele/

Availability

Terrestrial
- Digital: Channel 27

RTL Zwee (formerly Den 2. RTL) is a Luxembourg national general-interest television channel intended for young adults.

== History ==
RTL Zwee is the second specifically Luxembourgish television channel created by RTL Group on March 15, 2004, thirteen years after RTL Télé Lëtzebuerg. The channel is aimed at a younger audience than its predecessor, with live broadcasts of international sporting events for which RTL has acquired the rights in Luxembourg (UEFA Champions League, UEFA European Championship in particular).

On Monday March 23, 2020, due to the epidemic of coronavirus disease 2019 in Luxembourg, RTL Group, parent company of RTL Lëtzebuerg, decided to change to its current name and includes in its schedule, until further notice, the majority of entertainment programs and series produced by RTL Télé Lëtzebuerg as well as Luxembourg and international films.

RTL Télé Lëtzebuerg and RTL Zwee share the same on-air presentation since 2007, only the staff members in both channels are different. The on-air presentation was refreshed in 2011 and in 2017 (2017 being the year of the move of RTL Lëtzebuerg in its new seat called "RTL City"), at the same time as that of the news bulletin ("De Journal") of RTL Télé Lëtzebuerg.
