= RTL Plug =

- Country: Belgium
- Headquarters: Brussels, Belgium

Programming
- Language: French
- Picture format: 16:9

Ownership
- Owner: DPG Media (50%); Groupe Rossel (50%)
- Parent: RTL Belgium
- Sister channels: RTL-TVI, RTL Club, RTL District

History
- Launched: 13 February 2004; 22 years ago

Links
- Website: RTL Plug

RTL Plug is a general Belgian French speaking commercial television channel for Belgium and Luxembourg and targeting adolescents and young people (15-34 age bracket). The station is particularly popular in francophone parts of Belgium (Wallonia and Brussels), but also somewhat in Flanders, the Dutch-speaking region of Belgium as well.

The channel used the slogan "Complètement Plug" in 2005, "Plug RTL, une rentrée Lifestyle" in 2007, "Exprimes ton coté Plug!" in 2010 and presently "La chaîne Lifestyle".

On 28 March 2023, the channel rebranded as RTL Plug.

== History and ownership ==
The station was launched as Plug TV on 13 February 2004 and rename Plug RTL on 7 September 2007. 30 August 2010 marked moving to HD broadcasting as Plug RTL HD.

Plug RTL was run by Société luxembourgeoise RTL Belux S.A. & cie SECS, and was held till march 2022 by:

- 65.6% -- CLT-UFA S.A, affiliate at 99.7% of RTL Group
- 33.8% -- Belgian company Audiopresse S.A.
- 0.6% -- RTL Belux S.A.

Philippe Delusinne was CEO and Eusebio Larrea, head of production.

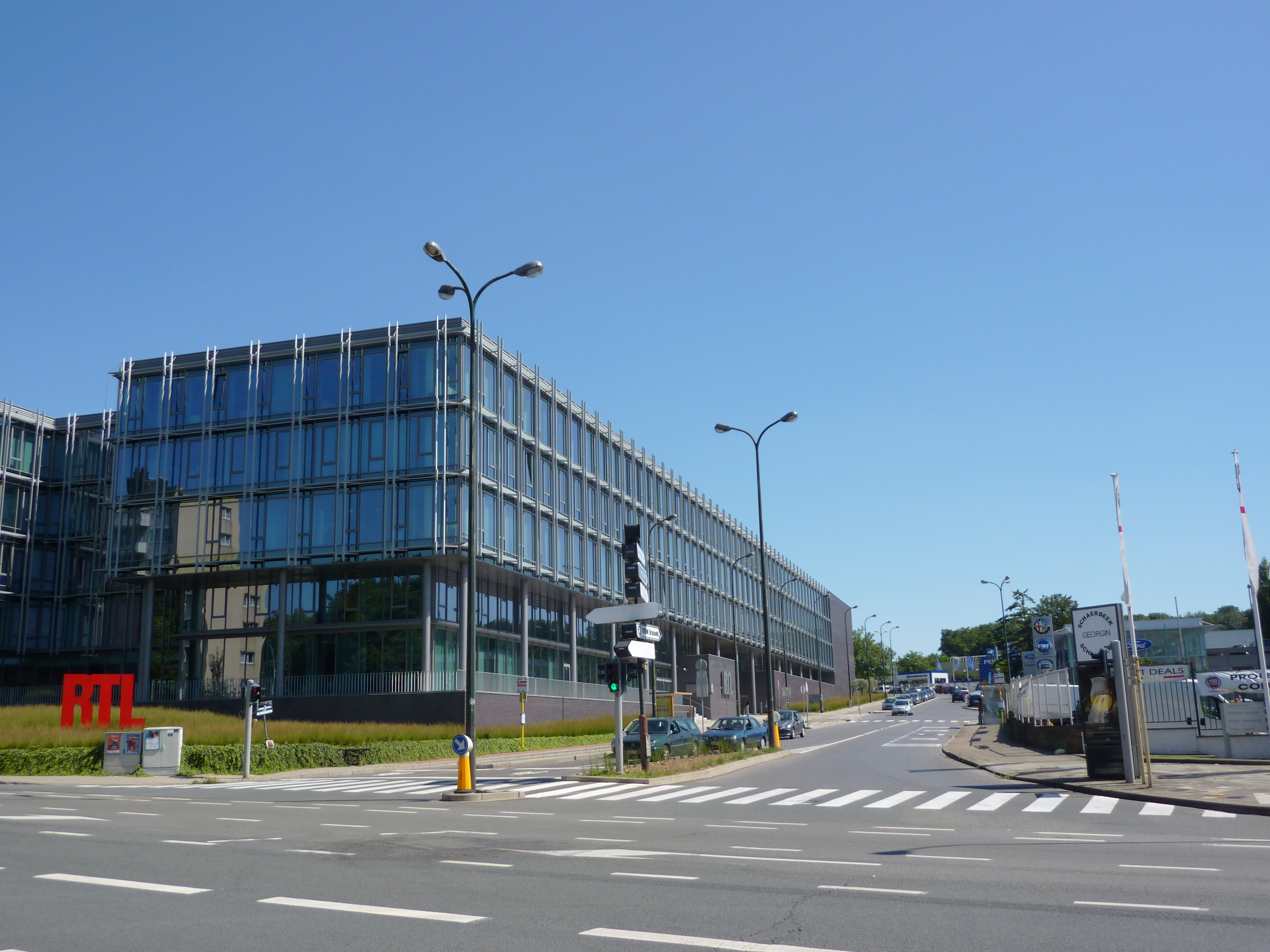
RTL Belgium is located at RTL House, on avenue Jacques Georgin, Schaerbeek (Brussels), Belgium.

RTL Belux S.A. & cie SECS has agreements with RTL Belgium S.A. to produce programmes for Plug RTL and two other stations, RTL-TVI (generalist station) and RTL Club specialising in films, sports, children programming. RTL Belgium S.A. was held till 31 march 2022 by CLT-UFA S.A. (66%) and Audiopresse S.A. (34%).

The head offices of RTL Plug were situated in KB2 building built by CLT-UFA in at 45, boulevard Pierre-Frieden, Kirchberg, Luxembourg, that allowed the chain a Luxembourg location allowing it to continue as a licensed Luxembourg company to broadcast within Luxembourg. RTL Belgium on the other hand is located at RTL House, on avenue Jacques Georgin, Schaerbeek (Brussels), Belgium.

RTL Belgium was acquired by DPG Media and Groupe Rossel on 31 March 2022, ended almost 31 years ownership by RTL Group. RTL Belgium ended the Luxembourg-status in March 2023 to become fully Belgian. The Belgian RTL channels thus lost their terrestrial licence in Luxembourg and ceased their broadcast from the Dudelange Tower on 29 February 2024.

The Belgian RTL channels were also transmitted in the Flemish pay DTT through TV Vlaanderen’s Antenne TV offer, from December 2017 until 1 September 2024.

== Programming ==
It rebroadcasts programming mainly from popular French stations, particularly from M6 and W9, reality TV shows and musical competitions like Nouvelle Star, La France a un incroyable talent, Rising Star, music videos and some internally produced programming like Lifestyle with Agathe Lecaron, Le Mag People and a weekly music programme. Other notable local programming includes Un dîner presque parfait, Criss Angel le magicien gothique etc.
