= Jérôme Lulling =

Luxembourgish linguist

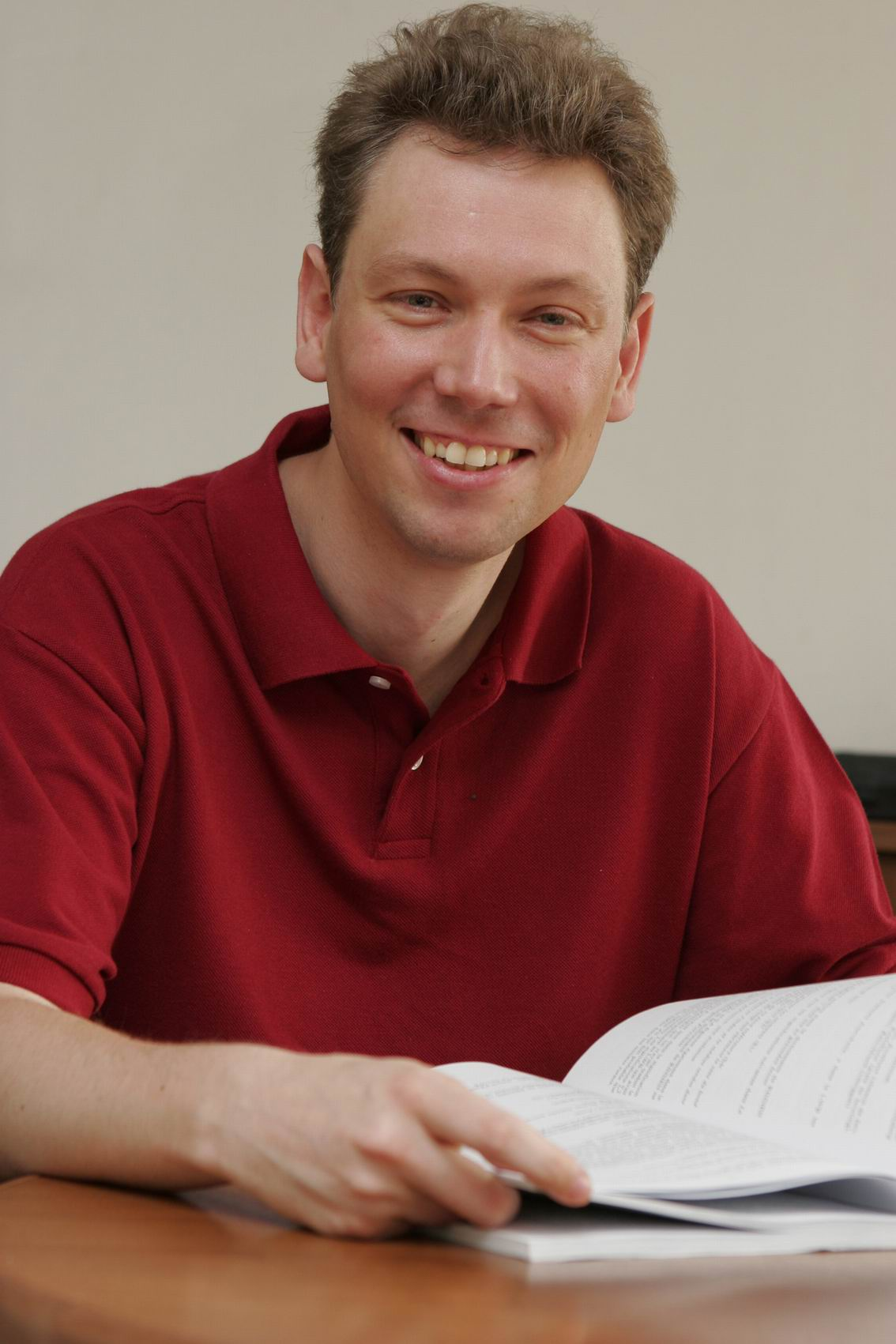
Lulling in 2005

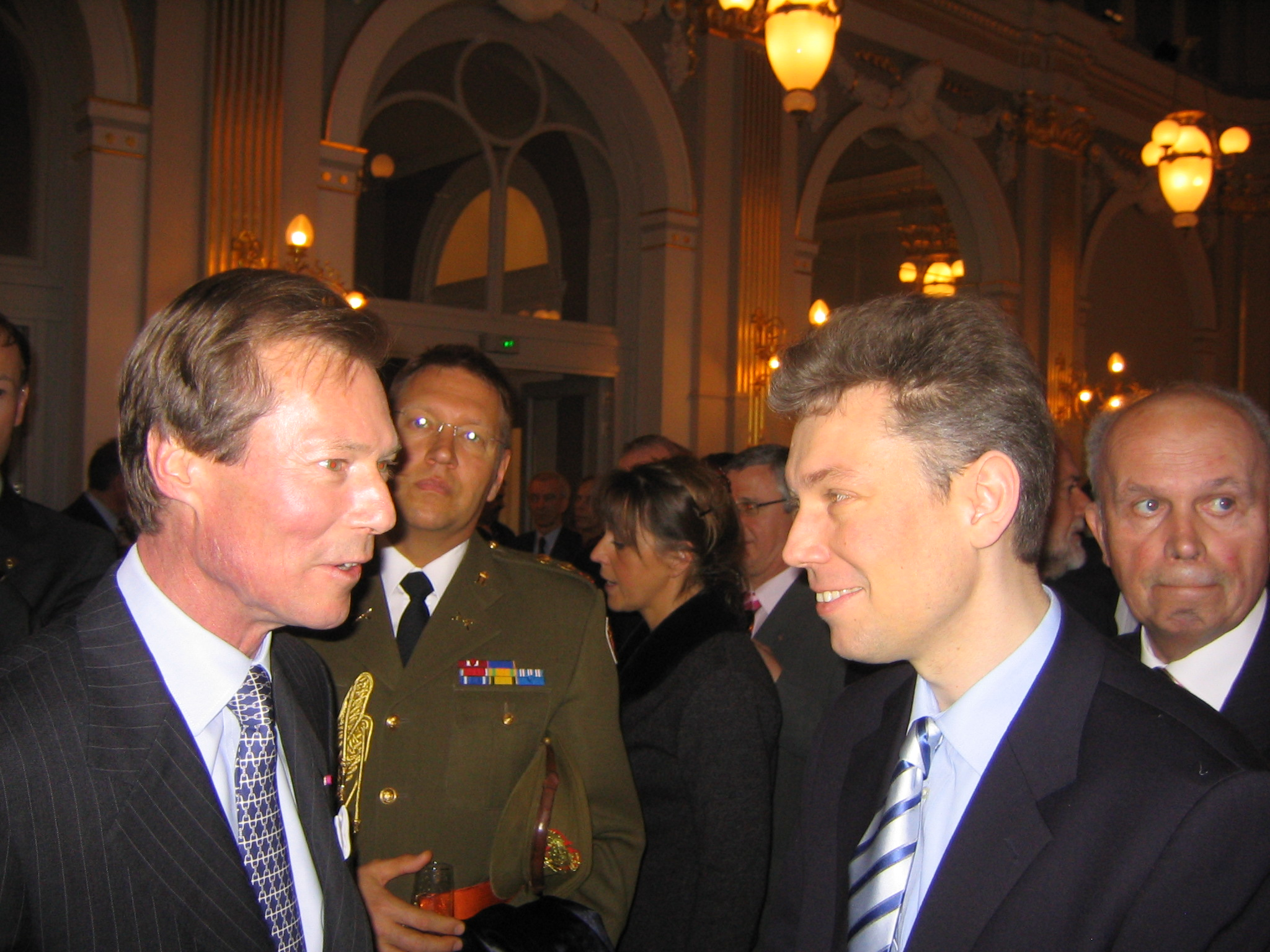
Lulling with Grand Duke Henri in 2007

Jérôme Ernest Léon Lulling (born 11 March 1971) is a Luxembourgish linguist who has been a leading figure in preservation and educational efforts relating to the Luxembourgish language, a Germanic language that has been recognized as the national language of Luxembourg since 1984 and is spoken by approximately 600,000 people worldwide.

His initial contributions to enhancing the language took place between 2000 and 2002, when he compiled the language’s first computer spellchecker as part of his Ph.D. dissertation at the Université Paul Valéry de Montpellier. The spellchecker, which consisted of 125,000 words, was known as Projet C.ORT.IN.A.

Lulling, working in partnership with fellow linguists François Schanen and Manfred Peters, compiled and edited the first Luxembourgish-French dictionary, Dictionnaire Bilingue Français-Luxembourgeois, which was published in 2005. The text consisted of 48,000 translated words and phrases. Lulling is also the co-author of Luxdico, the Luxembourgish online dictionary.

He has also co-authored two academic papers relating to Luxembourgish: Eng Kleng Hëllef fir Lëtzebuergesch ze schreiwen (2001). and Introduction à l’orthographe luxembourgeoise.

In 2011 Lulling published a DVD to learn Luxembourgish called 'LuxDVD - learning luxembourgish with videos'.

He is the nephew of politician Astrid Lulling, who served as a Member of the European Parliament from 1965 to 1974 and from 1989 to 2014, with whom he has co-authored Luxembourgish learning material.
