= RTL Club =

Luxembourg television station

- Country: Belgium
- Headquarters: Brussels, Belgium

Programming
- Language: French
- Picture format: 16:9

Ownership
- Owner: DPG Media (50%); Groupe Rossel (50%)
- Parent: RTL Belgium
- Sister channels: RTL-TVI, RTL Plug, RTL District

History
- Launched: 15 February 1995; 31 years ago

Links
- Website: RTL Club

RTL Club is a French-language Belgian television channel based in Brussels and owned by DPG Media and Groupe Rossel, it was originally owned by RTL Group until 31 March 2022. The channel is transmitted in Belgium and Luxembourg.

The channel is targeted to young audiences in the morning and to adults in primetime. Its programming consists of children’s series and cartoons in the morning and sports and American series in the evening.

Until 28 March 2023, the channel was known as Club RTL.

On 1 February 2016, the channel ceased airing its main animated series The Simpsons due to low ratings (2% share), whose French dub has been airing on the series for twenty years. The show moved to RTL Plug. At the time, RTL Belgium renegotiated with the production company every year to broadcast at least 150 old episodes.

RTL Belgium was acquired by DPG Media and Groupe Rossel on 31 March 2022, ending the 30 years ownership by RTL Group. RTL Belgium channels ended their Luxembourgish status in March 2023 to become fully Belgian, and thus lost their terrestrial licence in Luxembourg and ceased their transmission from the Dudelange transmitter on 29 February 2024. The Belgian RTL channels were also transmitted in the Flemish pay DTT through the Antenne TV service from TV Vlaanderen, from December 2017 until 1 September 2024.

Logo before 28 March 2023.
