= Luxemburger Wochenblatt =

Luxembourgish newspaper

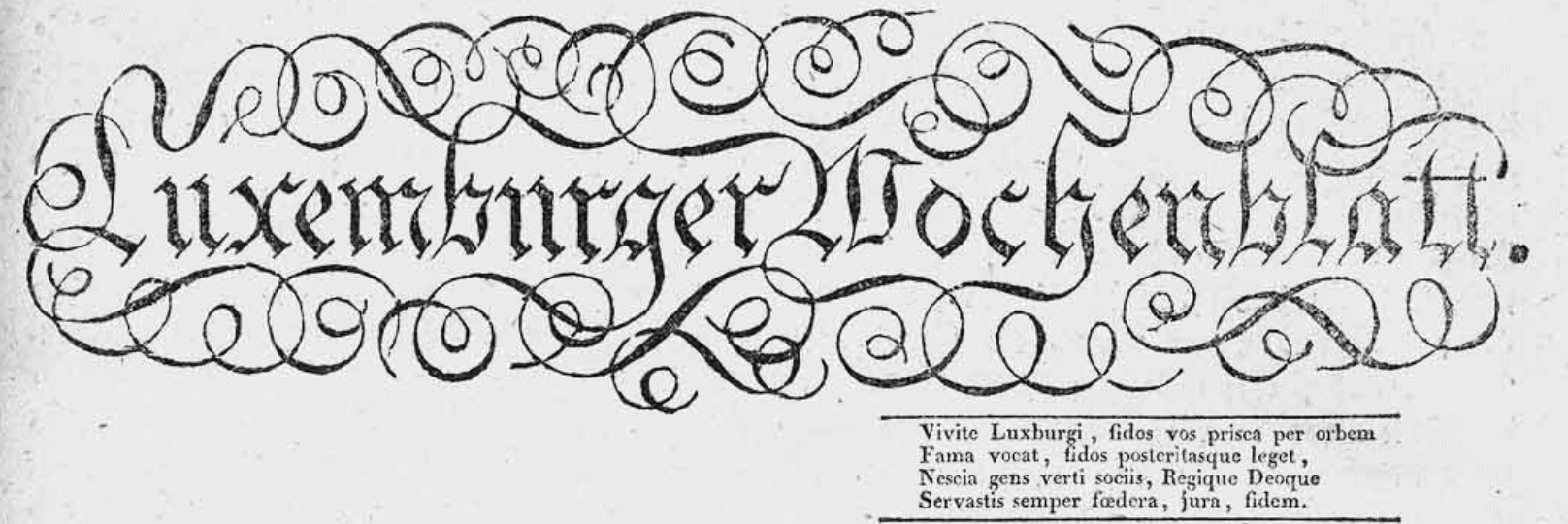
- Founded: 7 April 1821
- Ceased publication: 8 July 1826
- Language: German

Luxemburger Wochenblatt was a newspaper published in Luxembourg between 1821 and 1826. It was authored by Friedrich-Georg Weiß, formerly secretary to the Prussian police of the fortress.
