= RTL-TVI =

Belgian French-language television channel

RTL TVI
- Country: Belgium
- Broadcast area: Belgium; Luxembourg

Programming
- Language: French
- Picture format: 720p HDTV

Ownership
- Owner: DPG Media (50%); Groupe Rossel (50%)
- Parent: RTL Belgium
- Sister channels: RTL Club, RTL Plug, RTL District

History
- Launched: 12 September 1987; 38 years ago
- Former names: RTL Television (1982–1987)

Links
- Website: RTL TVI

RTL-TVI is a private French-language, Belgian-based television station owned by DPG Media and Groupe Rossel, it was originally owned by the RTL Group until 31 March 2022. Until 2022, it was broadcast with a Luxembourgish licence, but the new owners have switched to a Belgian license. Within the French-speaking area of Belgium, it is the most popular channel with a 20 percent viewing share. It was the first commercial television station in Belgium.

RTL-TVI offers a schedule of family-oriented information, entertainment and fiction genres. In French-speaking Belgium, almost all of the foreign programs are dubbed in French, instead of retaining the original soundtrack.

In Belgium, RTL Belgium also operates the French-language channels RTL Club, RTL Plug and RTL District.

== History ==
Since 1955, Télé-Luxembourg, which became RTL Television in 1982, is broadcast from the Dudelange transmitter in Luxembourg. Following the collision of a Belgian military plane with the transmitter on 31 July 1981, the Compagnie Luxembourgeoise de Télédiffusion (CLT) obtained compensation from the Belgian government. The state monopoly on television broadcasting was lifted.

On 12 September 1983, the Belgian version of the JTL show, presented by Jean-Charles De Keyser, Eddy de Wilde and Bibiane Godfroid, was launched from a small studio in Roosevelt villa, Brussels. In December 1985, CLT created a Belgian company called TVI SA, which produced programs and sold advertising space specifically for RTL Belgium.

Belgian TV channel RTL became independent on 12 September 1987 with the launch of RTL-TVI (Télévision Indépendante), which now produces all its programming in Brussels. This was the first independent channel in the French Community of Belgium. The registration by the Government of the French Community on 21 December 1987 enabled it to legally access the Belgian TV advertising market, through its subsidiary IPB. This monopoly was broken in 1989 when the government allowed commercial advertising on RTBF channels.

RTL Belgium was acquired by DPG Media and Groupe Rossel on 31 March 2022, ending the 30 years ownership by RTL Group. RTL Belgium ended the Luxembourg-status in March 2023 to become fully Belgian, and thus lost their terrestrial licence in Luxembourg and ceased their broadcast from the Dudelange transmitter on 29 February 2024.

The Belgian RTL channels were also transmitted in the Flemish pay DTT through TV Vlaanderen’s Antenne TV offer, from December 2017 until 1 September 2024.
