= Robert Diligent =

French journalist (1924–2014)

- Born: 16 June 1924; Roubaix, France
- Died: 3 January 2014 (aged 89); Nice, France
- Occupation: Journalist
- Years active: 1959–93

Robert Diligent (16 June 1924 – 3 January 2014) was a French journalist.

Born in Roubaix, he began his career in journalism in 1959 and was best known for being one of the founding members of Télé Luxembourg. He retired in 1993.

Robert Diligent died on 3 January 2014, aged 89, in Nice.
