= Dudelange Radio Tower =

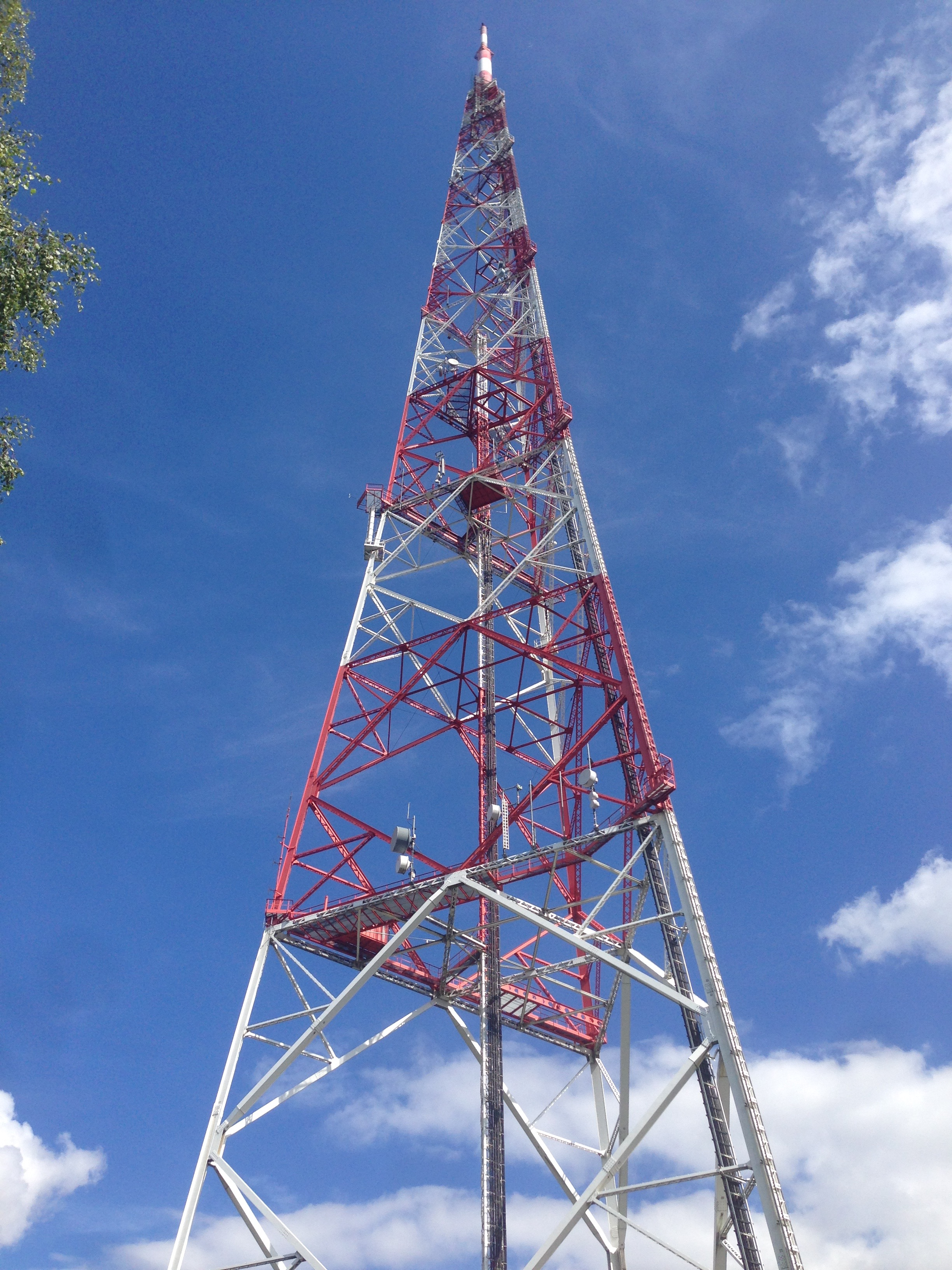

- Location within Luxembourg

General information
- Status: Complete, Rebuilt
- Type: Steel lattice television tower
- Location: Dudelange
- Coordinates: 49°27′48″N 6°05′45″E
- Completed: 1957

Height
- Height: 285 m (935 ft)

The Dudelange Radio Tower is a 285-meter (935 ft) high freestanding steel framework FM radio and television transmission tower, also called a lattice tower, with a triangular cross section located near Dudelange in Luxembourg. When completed in 1957 the Dudelange Radio Tower was the tallest structure in Luxembourg and the fourth tallest lattice tower in the world after the Tokyo, Eiffel and KCTV towers. It remains the tallest freestanding structure in Luxembourg today and the 5th tallest structure overall in the country.

== Plane Crash ==
On 31 July 1981, a Belgian (Mirage IIIE) military aircraft crashed into the tower at mid-height, tearing down the upper section of the tower. The pilot did not survive the crash, additionally debris from the tower also fell on a nearby house and tragically killed a broadcast engineer who lived there & his wife. The tower was reconstructed the following year.

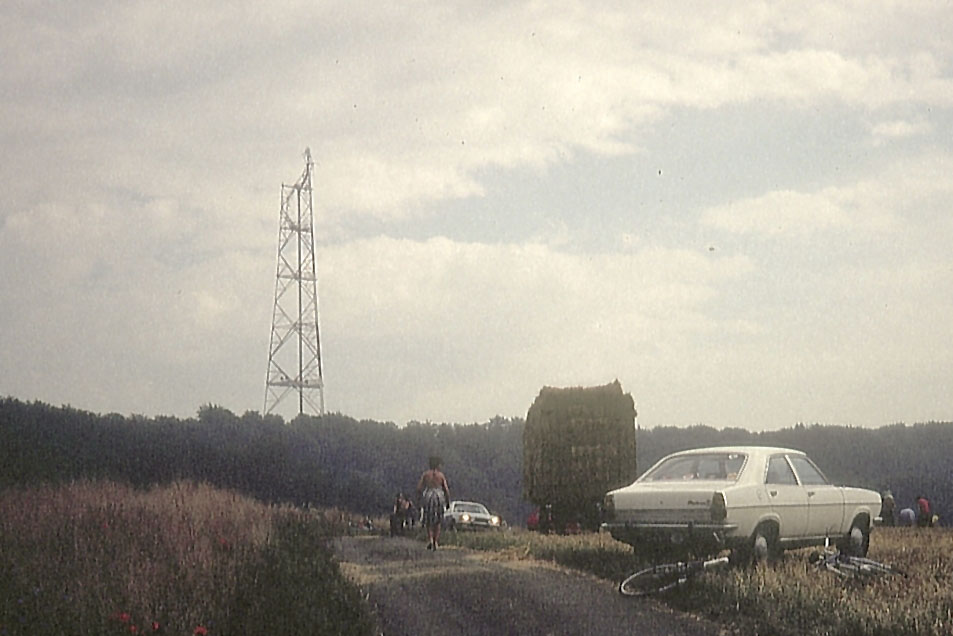
Dudelange tower immediately post accident

== Stations ==
=== Radio ===
FM stations that transmit from the Dudelange Radio Tower include the following

Callsign/Name	Frequency	Format	Owner
RTL Radio Lëtzebuerg	88.90		
RTL Radio	93.30		
Radio 100.7	100.70		

== See also ==
- Lattice tower
- List of tallest freestanding steel structures
- List of catastrophic collapses of broadcast masts and towers
- List of tallest structures in Luxembourg
- List of famous transmission sites
