= Olympia =

Olympia, Greece is a place in Greece where the Ancient Olympic Games were held, and directly or indirectly the namesake of most of the below.

Olympia may refer to:

== Arts and entertainment ==
=== Film ===
- Olympia (1938 film), by Leni Riefenstahl, documenting the Berlin-hosted Olympic Games
- Olympia (1998 film), about a Mexican soap opera star who pursues a career as an athlete
- Olympia (2011 film), about an aspiring porn actress
- Olympia (2018 drama film), an American romantic drama
- Olympia (2018 documentary film), about the career of Academy Award-winning actress Olympia Dukakis

=== Music ===
- Olympia (musician), Australian art-pop singer-songwriter-guitarist Olivia Jayne Bartley (born 1982)
- Olympia (Bryan Ferry album)
- Olympia (Austra album)
- Olympia (EP), by The Maybes?
- "Olympia" (song), by Sergio Mendes

=== Other arts and entertainment ===
- Olympia (Manet), an 1863 oil on canvas painting by Édouard Manet
- Olympia, a 1948 oil on canvas painting by René Magritte
- Olympia (comics), a fictional city in Marvel Comics
- Olympia, a mechanical doll in E. T. A. Hoffmann's short story "Der Sandmann", and in the opera The Tales of Hoffmann by Jacques Offenbach
- Olympia TV, a defunct French television channel

== Buildings and landmarks ==
=== United Kingdom ===
- Kensington (Olympia) station, a station in London, UK
- Liverpool Olympia, a theatre in Liverpool, UK
- Olympia London, an exhibition centre in London, UK

=== United States ===
- Detroit Olympia, the former stadium of the NHL's Detroit Red Wings
- Olympia Apartments (Washington, D.C.), U.S.
- Olympia Building, Atlanta, location of an iconic Coca-Cola sign
- Olympia Theatre (New York), a now-demolished theatre complex in New York City, U.S.

=== Elsewhere ===
- Olympia (Paris), famous music hall in France
- Olympia (São Paulo), former music venue in Brazil
- Olympia Milk Bar, cultural landmark in Sydney, Australia
- Olympia Theatre, Dublin, concert hall in Ireland
- Olympia Theatre, Perth, Australia, now the Luna Leederville
- Wirth's Olympia, venue in Melbourne, Australia

== Businesses ==
- Olympia Compact Discs Ltd., a British CD label active in the 1990s releasing material from the Soviet Union, Poland, the Netherlands and other countries
- Olympia Brewing Company (1896–2003), a brewery in Tumwater, Washington, U.S.
- Olympia Capital Holdings, a holding company for several African businesses
- Olympia Press, a French publisher
- Olympia and York, a now-bankrupt property firm based in Canada
- Olympia-Werke, a former major manufacturer of typewriters in Germany
- Olympia Sports, a sporting goods company

== Military ==
- HMS Olympia, ships of the Royal Navy
- USS Olympia, two US Navy ships named after the city of Olympia
- Olympia-class cruiser, a US Navy class of protected cruisers

== Organisms ==
- Olympia, a section of the plant genus Hypericum (St. John's-worts)
- Olympia oyster, a Pacific coast oyster
- Euchloe olympia, a North American butterfly commonly called the Olympia Marble

== People ==
- Olympia (given name)
- Iris Kyle (born 1974), American professional bodybuilder, nicknamed "Olympia"

== Places ==
=== Greece ===
- Olympia, Greece, the site of the ancient Olympic Games
- Olympia Province, a former province of Greece

=== United States ===
- Olympia, Georgia, a ghost town
- Olympia, Kentucky, an unincorporated community
- Olympia, Missouri, an unincorporated community
- Olympia, South Carolina, a census-designated place
- Olympia, Washington, the state capital

== Schools ==
- Olympia High School (disambiguation), several high schools in the US
- Olympia College, a for-profit group of American colleges, part of the Everest College system

== Sport ==
=== Sports clubs ===
- Olympia FC (disambiguation), several football clubs
- Olympia Club de Bruxelles, a former Belgian football club
- Olympia Sofia, a women's football club in Sofia, Bulgaria
- TSR Olympia Wilhelmshaven, a German sports club
- Olympia Larissa BC, a basketball club based in Larissa, Greece
- Olympia București, a football club based in Bucharest, Romania
- Olympia HC, a handball club in London, UK

=== Facilities ===
- Detroit Olympia, the former stadium of the National Hockey League's Detroit Red Wings
- Olympia Skistadion, a ski-jumping facility in Garmisch, Germany
- Olympia (Helsingborg), a football stadium in Helsingborg, Sweden
- Olympia Ice Center, a hockey rink in West Springfield, Massachusetts, US
- Olympia Leisure Centre (1974), a former swimming pool in Dundee, Scotland
- Olympia Leisure Centre (2013), a swimming pool in Dundee, Scotland

=== Other sports ===
- Olympia (horse), an American Thoroughbred racehorse
- Mr. Olympia, an annual bodybuilding contest
- Ms. Olympia, an annual women's bodybuilding contest

== Transportation ==
=== Maritime ===
- SS Olympia, a steamship that served the northwest US and Alaska
- MV Olympia, original name of SPL Princess Anastasia (1986), a cruiseferry operated by Viking Line between 1986 and 1993
- Olympia, later MS Regal Empress, an ocean liner
- Olympia Terminal, a dock in the South Harbour of Helsinki, Finland

=== Other transportation ===
- Olympia Regional Airport, Olympia, Washington, US, a public use airport
- EoN Olympia, a glider built in numbers in the 1940s in the UK
- Opel Olympia, a family car
- Olympia railway station, Olympia, Greece

== Other uses ==
- 582 Olympia, an asteroid
- Olympia Academy or "Akademie Olympia", a semi-formal group of friends that included Albert Einstein
- Walther Olympia, a 1936 semi-automatic handgun manufactured by Walther
- Olympia (ice resurfacer), a line of ice resurfacers manufactured by Resurfice Corporation

== See also ==
- Olympiastadion (Berlin), a stadium originally built for the cancelled 1916 Summer Olympics
- Olympia Heights, Florida, US
- Olympia Fields, Illinois, US
- DFS Olympia Meise, a glider built in numbers in the 1930s in Germany
- Olympias (disambiguation)
- Olympic (disambiguation)
- Olympus (disambiguation)
- Olympe (disambiguation)
- Olimpia (disambiguation)
- Olimpija (disambiguation)
