= Olimpia =

Olimpia may refer to:

== Sports teams ==
- Club Atlético Olimpia, a sports club based in Montevideo, Uruguay
- Club Deportivo Olimpia, a football team based in Tegucigalpa, Honduras
- Club Olimpia, a sports club based in Asunción, Paraguay
- Olímpia Esporte Clube, a football team from São Luís, Brazil
- Olímpia Futebol Clube, a football team from São Paulo, Brazil
- Olimpia Elbląg, a football team from Elbląg, Poland
- FC Olimpia Bălţi, a football team from Moldova
- FC Olimpia Satu Mare, a football team from Satu Mare, Romania
- FC Olimpia Volgograd, a football team from Volgograd, Russia
- Olimpia Milano, a basketball team based in Milan, Italy
- KK Olimpija, a defunct basketball team based in Ljubljana, Slovenia
- Olimpia Basketball Club, a basketball team based in Venado Tuerto, Argentina

== Other uses ==
- Olimpia (film), a 2018 Mexican adult animated thriller film directed by José Manuel Cravioto
- Olimpia Awards, the most important sports awards in Argentina
- Olimpia Sports Hall, an indoor arena in Ploiești, Romania
- Olimpia, Greater Poland Voivodeship (west-central Poland)
- Olímpia, a city in the Brazilian state of São Paulo
- Olimpia, a character in E.T.A. Hoffmann's short story "The Sandman"

== See also ==
- Olympia (disambiguation)
- Olympus (disambiguation)
- Olympe (disambiguation)
