= Compulsory education in China =

Compulsory education is the law for youth in the People's Republic of China (PRC).

After the Cultural Revolution, the slogan of compulsory education was advanced during the period of order out of chaos. It was written into the Constitution of China (1982 Constitution) by Deng Xiaoping and others.

In 1986 the "Compulsory Education Law of the People's Republic of China" was promulgated, and mainland China formally implemented nine years of compulsory education. In 2001, the State Council stated that mandatory nine-year education was universal.

In the PRC all youths must attend school from age six to fifteen, and parents must allow their children to do so and cover the associated costs. Compulsory education is in effect throughout mainland China. Families with financial difficulties can apply for two exemptions and one subsidy plan.

Compulsory education includes ideological and intellectual aspects and is closely related to the national literacy campaign.

Primary and secondary education is free only for public/state schools. Various private primary and secondary schools (including international schools) that charge fees are available in first- and second-tier cities with developed economies); in 2015, the proportion of private schools reached 10%, and the education market exceeded 315 million yuan.

== Regulations ==
The Constitution of China, adopted in 1982, stipulates that compulsory education should be implemented in mainland China.

The state develops socialist education and raises the scientific and cultural level of the whole nation.
The state organized various schools and popularized the Compulsory primary education， Developing secondary, vocational, and higher education and developing preschool education ... .

— "Constitution of the People's Republic of China", 1982 Edition (Revised in 2005), Article 19

On April 12, 1986, the Sixth National People's Congress's fourth meeting passed the "Compulsory Education Law of the People's Republic of China," which included provisions for nine-year compulsory education.

The state implements a nine-year compulsory education system.
Compulsory education is an education that all school-age children and adolescents must receive, and it is a public welfare undertaking that the state must guarantee.
Implementation of compulsory education, no tuition fees, miscellaneous fees.
The state establishes a compulsory educational funding guarantee mechanism to ensure the implementation of the compulsory education system.

— "Compulsory Education Law of the People's Republic of China", 1986 edition (2015 revision), Article 2

On June 29, 2006, the 22nd meeting of the Standing Committee of the Tenth National People's Congress revised the law, clarifying that the essence of compulsory education should be Quality Education.

Compulsory education must implement the country's education policy, provide quality education, improve the quality of education, and enable school-age children and teenagers to develop in an all-around way regarding morality, intelligence, and physique. This will cultivate socialist construction with ideals, character, culture, and discipline—corrected text: Lay the foundation for successors and successors.

— "Compulsory Education Law of the People's Republic of China", 2006 Edition (2015 Revision), Article 3

== Right to free education ==
In the PRC, the right to education has gradually become taken seriously, especially in urban areas where deprivation is considered a serious crime. The Law on the Protection of Minors has provisions related to the right of school-age children to compulsory education.

Article 13 Parents or other guardians shall respect the right of minors to receive education, enable children of school age to enrol in school to receive and complete compulsory education per the law, and not allow juveniles receiving compulsory education to drop out of school.

......

Article 28 People's governments at all levels shall guarantee the right of minors to receive education and take measures to ensure that children from families with financial difficulties, those with disabilities, and minors among floating populations receive compulsory education.
......

— "Law of the People's Republic of China on the Protection of Minors", 1991 Edition (Revised in 2013)

The starting age for education is six. Absent suspension or repetition midway, children finish compulsory education once they reach fifteen.

In China, the legal minimum age for working is sixteen. Work contracts signed before reaching sixteen have no legal force. Even if children under 16 are recruited in industries such as art and sports, their right to receive compulsory education is guaranteed.

Article 61 No organization or individual may recruit minors under the age of 16 unless otherwise stipulated by the state.
......
Article 125 Violations of the provisions of Article 61 of this law shall be ordered by the departments of culture and tourism, human resources and social security, and market supervision and management to make corrections within a time limit according to the division of responsibilities, give warnings, confiscate illegal gains, and may concurrently impose a fine of less than 100,000 yuan. If it refuses to make corrections or if the circumstances are serious, it shall be ordered to suspend production or business, or its business license and related permits shall be revoked, and a fine of not less than 100,000 yuan shall be imposed. Not more than 1 million yuan shall be imposed.
......

— "Law of the People's Republic of China on the Protection of Minors", 1991 Edition (Revised in 2013)

Article 15 Employers are prohibited from recruiting minors under the age of 16.
Arts, sports, and special craft units recruiting minors under the age of 16 must abide by relevant state regulations and guarantee their right to receive compulsory education.
......

Article 18 The following labor contracts are invalid：
(1) Labor contracts that violate laws and administrative regulations；
......
An invalid labor contract is not legally binding from the moment it is concluded.
......

Article 94 Where an employer illegally recruits minors under the age of 16, the labor administrative department shall order it to make corrections and impose a fine. if the circumstances are serious, the market supervision and management department shall revoke its business license.
......

— "Labor Law of the People's Republic of China", 1994 Edition (2018 Revision)

Governments at all levels in China have implemented two exemptions: tuition and miscellaneous fees are exempted, and textbooks are provided free of charge. For those who have financial difficulties paying tuition fees, the "two exemptions and one subsidy plan" policy was implemented. This means that in addition to the exemptions, living expenses are subsidized. However, schools may charge homework fees, school uniform fees, board fees, boarding school accommodation fees, etc., according to the situation.

== Features ==
According to the Compulsory Education Law, China's compulsory education has four main features：

- It is the obligation of schools, parents, and society to allow school-age children and teenagers to receive education. Whoever fails this obligation violates the law. Parents who do not send their students to school, bear the responsibility. Schools that do not accept school-age children bear the responsibility. Employers who disrupt the education of school-age children to recruit them to work bear the responsibility.
- The state stipulates that "no tuition fees and miscellaneous fees" are charged during compulsory education.
- Unified standards are defined for textbook formatting, teaching practices, funding allocation, construction guidelines and means for public funds for students.
- Education should develop in a balanced manner across each region.

== School-running system ==
School Systems
grade	age	Nine-year consistent system	May-four school system	Six-three school system
Ninth grade	14~15	nine-year consistent school	junior high school	middle school
Eighth grade	13~14	nine-year consistent school	junior high school	middle school
Seventh grade	12~13	nine-year consistent school	junior high school	middle school
sixth grade	11~12	nine-year consistent school	junior high school	primary school
Fifth grade	10~11	nine-year consistent school	primary school	primary school
fourth grade	9~10	nine-year consistent school	primary school	primary school
Third grade	8~9	nine-year consistent school	primary school	primary school
second grade	7~8	nine-year consistent school	primary school	primary school
First grade	6~7	nine-year consistent school	primary school	primary school

In China the government predominantly operates the educational institutions that provide compulsory education. Private schools must comply with classification and placement regulations.

In certain higher-level administrative regions, the education authorities may assume direct management of certain public schools. However, the county or city where these schools are located still bears the ultimate responsibility. The administrative duties of private schools are overseen by the pertinent departments in the county or city where they are situated, although the operator assumes responsibility for financing, administration, and faculty.

The compulsory education stage is categorized into three distinct systems: the 6-3 school system, the 5–4 school system, and the nine-year consistent system.

- The 6-3 school system, consisting of six years of primary education and three years of middle education was first established during the Beiyang government era. It was derived from the Jenxu school system. Jenxu is the prevailing model, and is the most widespread educational system worldwide.
- The 5-4 school system, which consists of a five-year primary school and a four-year middle school, is implemented in some areas of the country.
- The nine-year consistent system is a developing educational and administrative system. Students attend the same school for the entire nine years, during which they are promoted to higher grades but not advanced beyond the school's curriculum.

== Elementary school ==
=== Admission ===
The "Compulsory Education Law of the People's Republic of China" specifies the age at which primary school students are required to start school:

For children who have reached the age of six, their parents or other legal guardians should send them to school to accept and complete compulsory education; children in areas where the conditions are not met can be postponed until the age of seven.

=== Political education ===
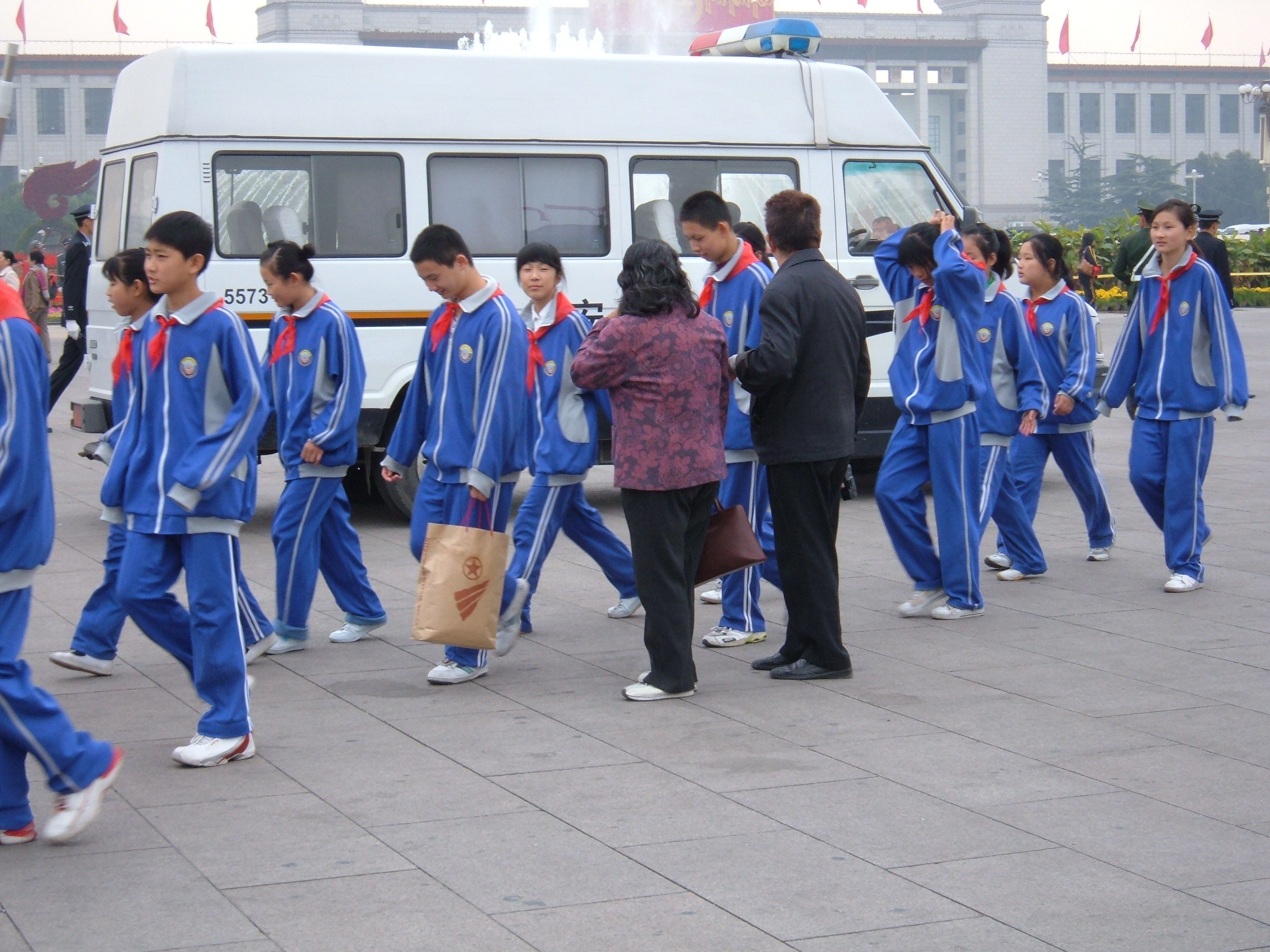
Young Pioneers in Tian 'anmen Square, 2007

The "Articles of Association Young Pioneers of China, " revised in 2005, stipulated that the minimum age for joining the organization would be lowered from 7 to 6 years old. Before this revision, the requirement for newly enrolled primary school students was to wear green scarves for six months to one year due to the one-year gap between joining and enrollment. This differentiated them from students wearing red scarves. Students with poor academic performance were also given green scarves.

After the revision of the "Constitution of the Young Pioneers", most elementary school students were compelled to "immediately join the team upon enrollment" and become members of the Chinese Young Pioneers, with few exceptions. Nearly all primary school students are members of the Young Pioneers, numbering 130 million individuals. It is the world's largest pioneer organization.

The Young Pioneers established associations in every primary and middle school throughout the nation. They are structured into brigades, squadrons, and squads. Each team comprises a minimum of 5 and a maximum of 13 individuals, led by a primary team and deputy team leaders. A squadron consists of two or more subunits, and a committee of 3-7 members is established for each. A brigade comprises two or more squadrons, and a committee of 7 to 13 members is established to oversee its operations. Within this group, the team members elect the squad leader, as well as the members of the squadron and brigade committees. Elections are conducted on a semi-annual or annual basis.

In elementary school, squadron committees work in each class to work in conjunction with the class committees, making them nearly indistinguishable. The squad leader, who is typically also the squadron leader, is responsible for overseeing the collective efforts of the class. The squadron committee of the course typically comprises the following roles:

- Captain
- Deputy captain
- Standard bearer
- Member of the study committee
- Member of the labour committee
- Member of the cultural and entertainment committee
- Member of the sports committee
- Member of the organization committee
- Member of the publicity committee

The squadron is set up under the company, and the squad leader is elected. The brigade is organized as a unit with the primary school, and a dedicated counsellor is assigned to lead it under the guidance of the Communist Youth League Committee of the school.

=== Curriculum ===
Primary schools generally offer the following courses:

- Language. The primary focus of this course is to acquire fundamental knowledge of Chinese characters, pinyin, poetry, classical Chinese, and contemporary Chinese. For example, Chinese textbooks compiled by the People's Education Press in 2017 prioritize teaching Chinese characters before pinyin. 30% of Chinese textbooks is dedicated to ancient poetry and essays, with a greater emphasis on extracurricular reading. A longer classical Chinese report is included in the second semester of fifth grade. The study of contemporary literature provides a solid basis for instructing students in middle school.
- Math
- Morality/rule of law. Political courses.
- Science. The essential content of material science, life science, earth and space science, technology and engineering, and preparing to introduce physics, chemistry, geography, and biology in middle schools. Science courses are taught from the first grade of primary school as an introductory course.
- Music
- Art
- IT
- Sports & health
- Labor. Content is divided into daily life labor (cleaning, storage, cooking, etc.), productive labor (agriculture, traditional crafts, new technologies, etc.), and service labor (public welfare volunteering, etc.)

Depending on the actual situation, the following courses may be offered:

- Foreign languages. Especially for English, almost all qualified schools in the country offer it in the middle and upper grades (starting from third grade). Good primary schools teach English from first grade.
- National language. Minority schools operate in ethnic autonomous areas and mixed-inhabited areas.
- School-based courses, local courses, and extracurricular interest courses.

Since no unified examination applies to graduating from primary school, quality of courses other than Chinese, mathematics, and English vary. Primary schools in rural areas generally offer only Chinese, mathematics, and physical education.

=== Further studies ===
Primary school students are rarely expelled, and most complete their studies without significant obstacles.

== Middle school ==
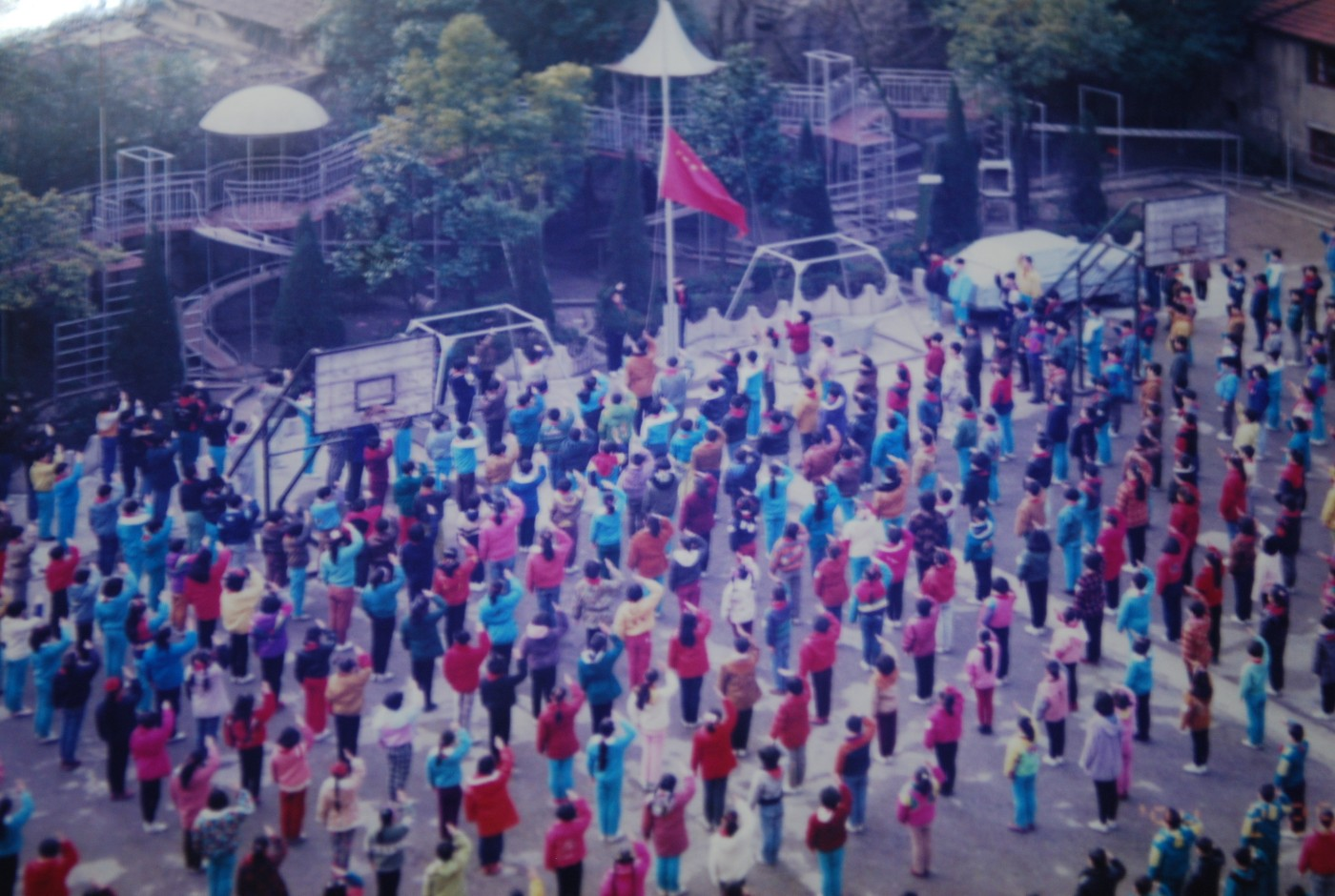
Meeting of the morning of the elementary school, Shanghai, China

Compulsory education continues after primary school. The only means of pursuing higher education is enrolling in a middle school.

=== Admission ===
In mainland China students gain admission to middle schools through various means:

- School choice: Elite middle schools attract and educate outstanding students. However, this method lost popularity.
- Residency: This is the most widely used system in small and medium-sized cities and rural areas. The procedure involves dividing a county into districts. Within each community, a middle school is designated, and all primary school graduates within the district enrol in that school. Some high-quality middle schools or those near district boundaries may also enrol students from neighbouring communities. In urban areas, parents often seek to purchase properties near high-quality educational resources. This is due to the uneven distribution of such resources. In mountainous regions such as Guizhou, Sichuan, and Shaanxi, schools face limited infrastructure, sparse student population, and absence of school transportation. Students may travel more than ten kilometres on foot to attend school daily. In this instance, many students drop out.
- Random allocation: In some metropolitan regions, multiple middle schools are close to each other, or many students cannot secure admission to the best schools. Often, students are assigned to schools randomly through an automated system.
- Nine-year consistent school: During the transition from sixth to seventh grade, certain schools reorganize their class structures.

The typical class size in middle schools is 60 students, although it may vary between 30 and 80 students.

Emblem of the Communist Youth League of China

=== Political education ===
From the second to the third year of middle school, students leave the Young Pioneers and join the Chinese Communist Youth League (CYL). It is one of the world's largest youth organizations with 89 million members. According to the Constitution of the Communist Youth League of China, Chinese youths over the age of 14 and under the age of 28 participate, actively work with it, implement its resolutions, and pay dues. Some people join at age twelve or thirteen, while others join later.

CYL establishes grassroots organizations in local state organs, people's organizations, economic organizations, cultural organizations, schools, the PLA, the Chinese People's Armed Police Force, and leading non-party organizations. It is organized in branches.

CYL has organizations in middle schools across the country, known as Youth League Committees (YLC); and YLCs in all classes to jointly manage the courses with class committees. Branches generally have positions such as secretary, organization committee member, and propaganda committee member who are responsible for specific matters.

=== Curriculum ===
Students must complete nine main subjects, seven examined at the end of Year 9 and two at the end of Year 8.

The nine courses are Chinese, mathematics, foreign languages, physics, chemistry, morality and the rule of law, history, geography, and biology.

Students also study physical education, music, art, information technology, labour technology, and other courses. Students in some areas and schools also receive instruction in ethnic languages, local practices, and school-based procedures.

=== Graduation and further studies ===
In the 1980s the middle and senior high school entrance examinations were integrated. Students who fail the high school entrance examination do not graduate. In the early 1990s, the graduation and entrance examinations separated. In the late 1990s, graduation examinations for middle schools were abolished. As long as the final grades of all courses within three years are above the pass line (60% of the total score), students can graduate. Students who leave before graduating are often expelled for severe violation of school discipline and laws. Students in the ninth year face the middle school entrance examination, namely the senior high school entrance examination. Middle schools adopt various methods to prepare students for the senior high school entrance examination.

According to test scores, students enrol either in key high schools, ordinary high schools, secondary professional schools, secondary vocational schools, or directly enter society. Since this level of education is not compulsory, entering society is an option.

The high school entrance examination time mostly takes place in middle and late June; exam subjects are determined by each district.

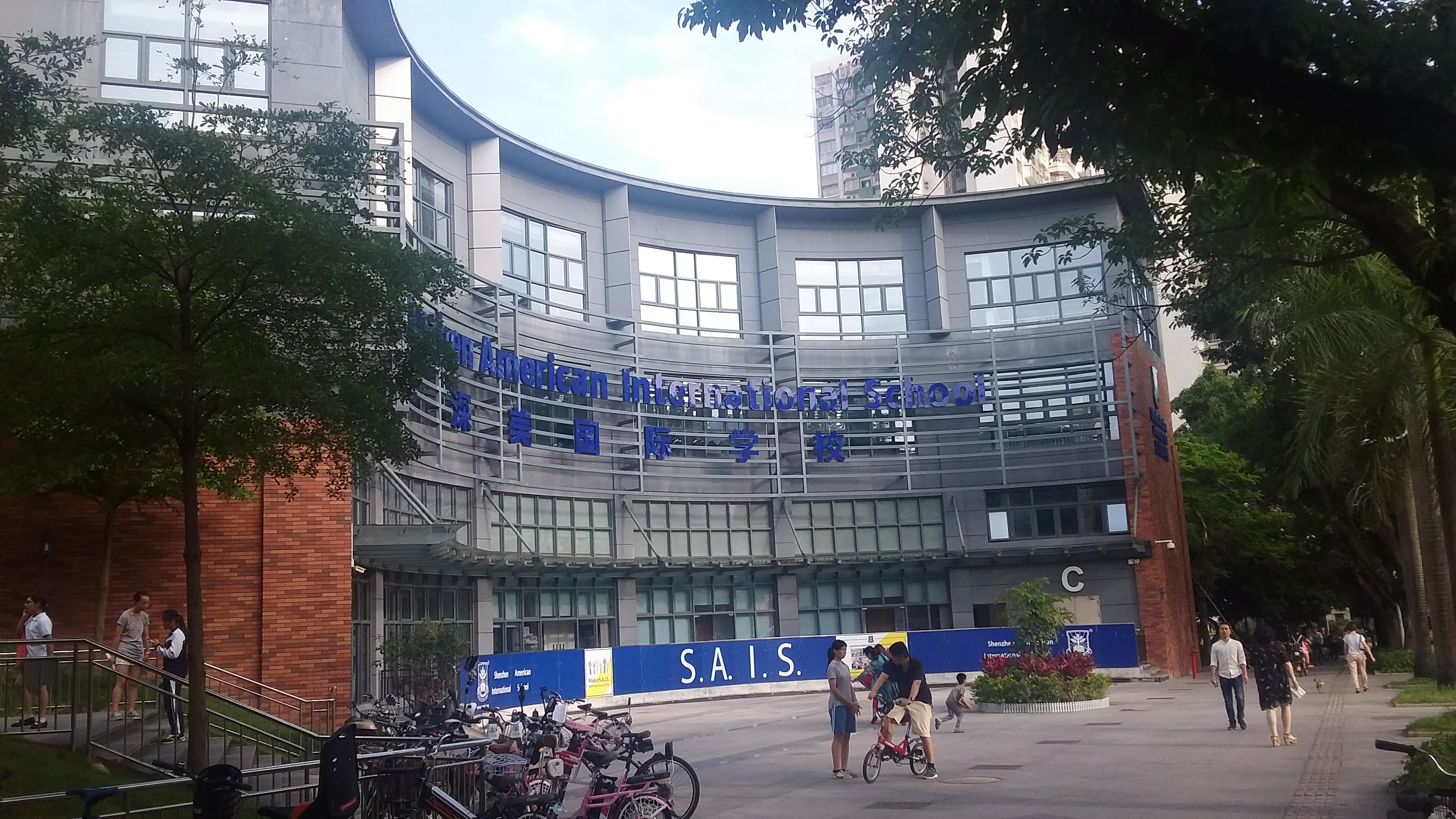
Shenzhen American International School

== Private education ==
Domestic and international groups have entered the education field, establishing high-quality private schools to compete with the public schools. At the end of the 1990s, a wave of private schools opened in large and medium-sized cities. However, many failed due to funding problems.

Most private schools are attached to an housing estate by real estate developers. International schools are operated by foreign institutions.

== After-class life ==
Students have many extracurricular options, juggling them with demands for studying.

=== Vacation ===
Under normal circumstances semesters last 20 weeks, leaving 12 weeks of vacation. These are generally divided into "winter vacation" and "summer vacation." Winter vacation includes the Spring Festival,. Winter and summer vacations are usually about one month in winter and two months in summer. In high latitudes, winter vacation sometimes lasts up to two months.

=== Internet ===
In recent years, more and more children have begun to be influenced by the Internet using electronic devices such as computers, phones, and tablets. Students start information technology courses from elementary school and continue through their first year of middle school. Information technology courses focus on using computers and applications. Some schools teach computer programming. In middle schools. Students can compete in NO IP's division.

Primary and middle school students are exposed to many sites. They may become addicted to online games, webcasting, and other activities. They spend money use lucky cash, or their parents' funds. In middle school, students become interested in gender differences. Pornographic websites are popular. People in mainland China generally do not support sex education.

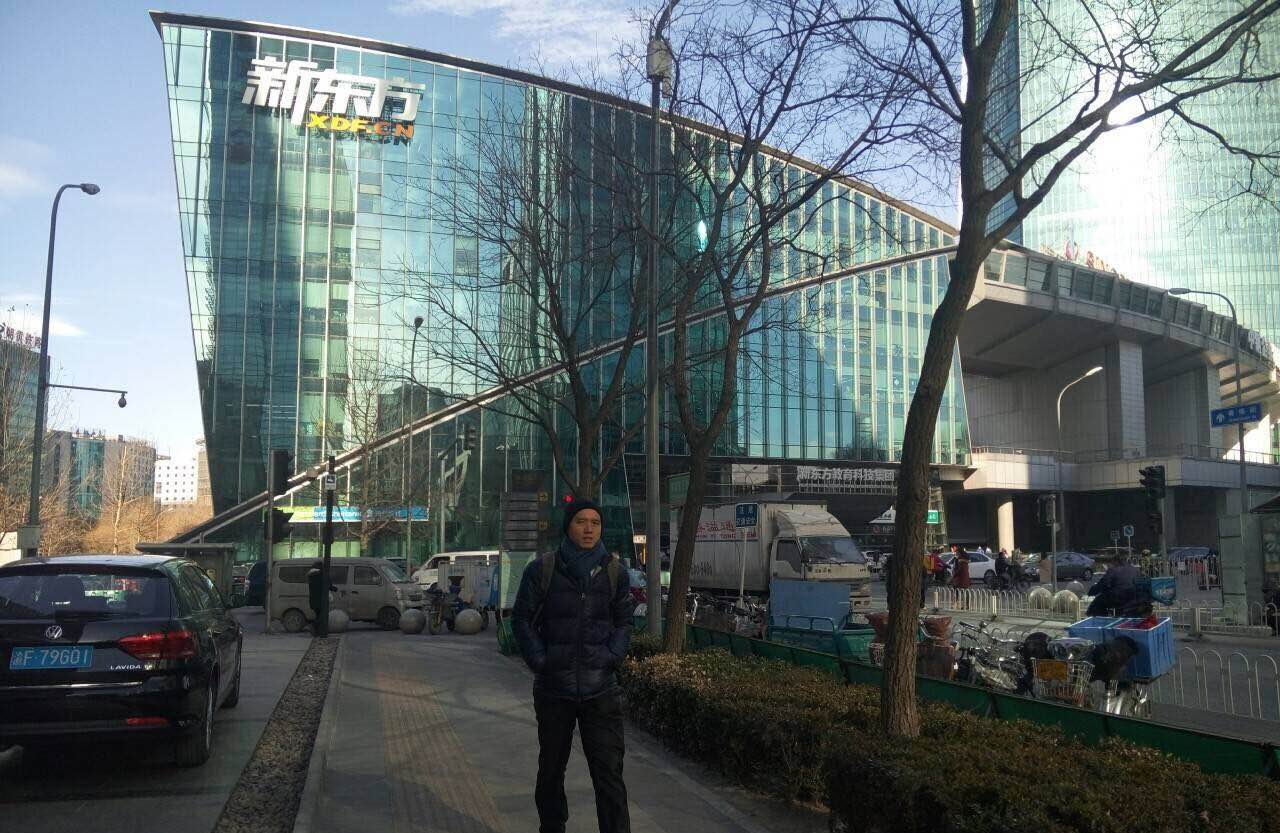
Outside the headquarters of New Oriental

=== Private education ===
Many parents adhere to the idea that "you shouldn't lose at the starting line." They often spend money and save on food and other expenses to enrol their children in training courses.

In mainland China training courses are generally divided into:

- Learning classes. Includes advanced and remedial classes, such as Math Olympiad classes. The Math Olympiad class gradually disappeared once the Olympic competition was no longer a bonus item for college admissions. Remedial training classes mainly refer to students working to catch up to grade level knowledge through one-on-one or small groups outside school with varying quality. Most teachers are outside the system. Some middle school teachers participate, despite strict prohibitions.
- Foreign language class. Especially in English, some training institutions invite foreign teachers to teach oral skills. Some training institutions focus on test-taking skills. Teaching materials include textbooks, "New Concept English" and "Cambridge English: Young Learners."
- Chinese studies. Most of these training courses emphasize traditional culture, ancient poetry, and prose.
- Stylistic category.

== Dispute ==
September 23, 2020. Ministry of Education of the PRC: The number of dropouts from 600,000 to 2,419

=== Expansion of compulsory education ===
Whether to expand compulsory education to 13 years compulsory education from preschool to senior high school is disputed. Some regions in China have begun to promote 12-year free education by reducing or exempting tuition fees for senior high schools and exempting tuition fees for technical secondary schools and vocational schools.

Free education and compulsory education are different concepts:

- Free education means students do not need to pay tuition and miscellaneous fees to attend. In some districts, textbook fees and food expenses are also exempted.
- Compulsory education requires students to attend school. Parents must allow students to attend and cannot force them to leave.

The 12-year free education available in some parts of China is not all compulsory. Those areas now have a "9+3" system (9 years of mandatory and 3 additional years of free education).

=== Exam-oriented education ===
China selects students through quantitative standards, despite "reforms of college entrance examinations", "reforms of high school entrance examinations", and "self-enrollment". The version of the "Law on the Protection of Minors," enacted on June 1, 2007, attempted to curb exam-oriented education with little Some scholars believe that substituting subjective "quality evaluation" for objective examination competition will induce students' parents to bribe teachers, leading to "the upper class has no poor family, and the lower class has no family."

=== Farmers' children's education ===
Due to the household registration system (hukou), the social welfare of urban and rural people is quite different. This problem is highlighted in compulsory education for children of migrant workers.

Farmers who traditionally engaged in agriculture moved into other industries, and moved to cities. The houkou system disadvantages them as the move to areas with better opportunities. They have difficulties with employment, housing, and also education for their children, leading many to leave their children in the countryside with their grandparents.

Education of migrant workers' children is a prominent problem in education in China, although major cities have gradually eased the restrictions on their education.
