= Olympia Leisure Centre =

Olympia Leisure Centre may refer to:

- Olympia Leisure Centre (1974) in Dundee, Scotland
- Olympia Leisure Centre (2013) in Dundee, Scotland
