= Parsada =

Town of ancient Lydia

Coordinates: 38°23′35″N 27°38′20″E

Parsada was a town of ancient Lydia, inhabited during Byzantine times. Its name does not occur among ancient authors, but is inferred from epigraphic and other evidence.

Its site is located near Bağyurdu (formerly Parsa) in Asiatic Turkey.
