= V&A Dundee =

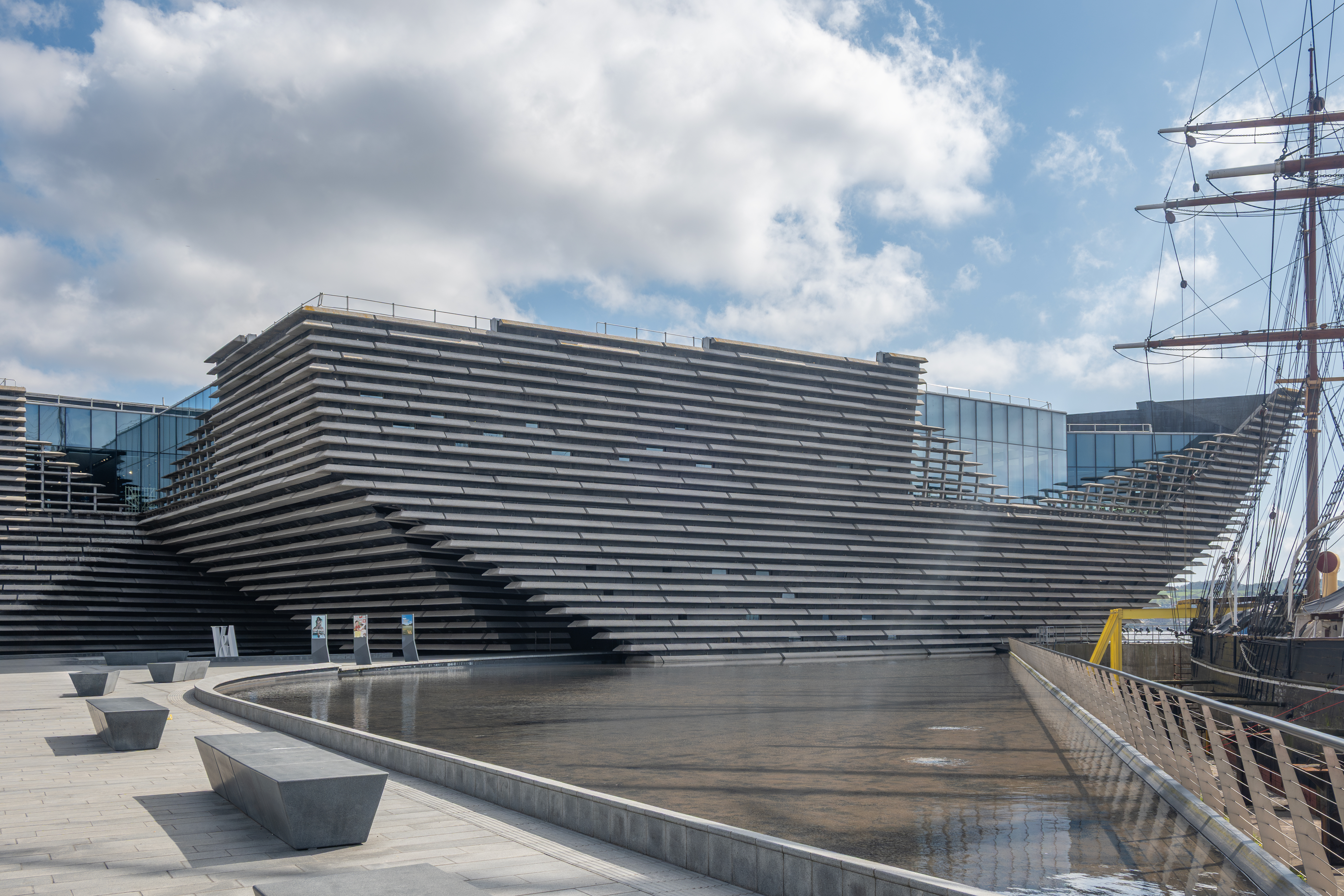
- The museum

- Location of the V&A Dundee within Dundee
- Established: 15 September 2018
- Location: 1 Riverside Esplanade, Dundee, Scotland
- Coordinates: 56°27′26.9″N 02°58′02.0″W
- Type: Design museum
- Visitors: 329,600 (2025)
- Director: Leonie Bell
- Chairperson: Tim Allan
- Architect: Kengo Kuma
- Owner: Design Dundee Ltd.
- Website: vam.ac.uk/dundee

V&A Dundee is a design museum in Dundee, Scotland, which opened on 15 September 2018. The V&A Dundee is the first design museum in Scotland and the first Victoria and Albert museum outside London. The V&A Dundee is also the first building in the United Kingdom designed by Kengo Kuma, whose vision was for a 'living room for the city'.

== History ==
The plan for a V&A museum in Dundee originated at the University of Dundee in 2007 when Georgina Follett (then Dean of Duncan of Jordanstone College of Art and Design) suggested it to the University Principal, Sir Alan Langlands. Subsequently, Joan Concannon, the university's director of external relations, made a 20-minute pitch to Sir Mark Jones, then director of the Victoria and Albert Museum, in which the case for Dundee was made, including its potential as an anchor for the urban regeneration of the waterfront.

A design competition took place in 2010 to decide what the museum would look like. The Japanese architect Kengo Kuma won the competition; his design was inspired by the eastern cliff edges of Scotland, as well as Dundee's industrial history as a shipping port.

The museum was constructed where the Olympia Leisure Centre stood previously. BAM Construction carried out the construction work beginning in April 2014. The original completion date was 2017 but it was delayed to 2018. During construction a cofferdam was installed to allow the outer wing to expand onto the River Tay and 780 tonnes of pre-cast grey concrete slabs were added to the outside of the building. It cost £80.1 million to complete.

The V&A Dundee opened to the public on 15 September 2018 with international and national press previews taking place beforehand from 13–14 September 2018. The opening was celebrated with a 3D Festival which featured acts such as Primal Scream, Be Charlotte and Lewis Capaldi, along with a light show and a firework display. The opening highlights were broadcast on BBC Two Scotland in a programme hosted by Edith Bowman. The museum attracted 27,201 visitors during its first week and 100,000 in its first three weeks.

The museum was officially opened by Prince William, Duke of Cambridge, and Catherine, Duchess of Cambridge, in a private official opening, held on 28 January 2019.

On 30 March 2019, the museum achieved its target of 500,000 visitors within a year, six months earlier than expected.

In early April 2020, V&A Dundee was due to launch its fourth exhibition, focusing on the fashion of Mary Quant, but the museum temporarily closed on 18 March 2020 because of the COVID-19 pandemic. Over the course of 2020, the V&A Dundee relabelled several of the museum's historical exhibits to better reflect their ties to Scottish involvement in colonialism and slavery.

In September 2023, as part of the museum's fifth anniversary, it was revealed that the V&A Dundee had been visited by 1.7 million people, and that, to date, generated £304 million for the Scottish economy, and £109 million for Dundee's economy. On 15 September 2023, a new permanent exhibition, Stories from the Building, which looks at the background and architecture of the museum opened .

In January 2024, it was announced that the V&A Dundee would only host one major exhibition a year, in a cost-cutting exercise.

== Features ==
=== Exhibition galleries ===
The exhibition galleries showcase temporary exhibitions that are curated inhouse, or in collaboration with other national and international museums and institutions. Some have an entrance fee, while others are free to explore.

#	Exhibition	Dates	Ref
1	Ocean Liners: Speed and Style	15 September 2018 – 24 February 2019	
2	Video Games: Design/Play/Disrupt	20 April 2019 – 8 September 2019	
3	Hello, Robot: Design Between Human and Machine	2 November 2019 – 23 February 2020	
4	Mary Quant	27 August 2020 – 17 January 2021	(Note: Originally planned to run from 4 April – 6 September; however, because of the COVID-19 pandemic, the V&A Dundee temporarily closed, with the exhibition moved to later in the year.)
5	Night Fever: Designing Club Culture	1 May 2021 – 9 January 2022	
6	Michael Clark: Cosmic Dancer	5 March 2022 – 4 September 2022	
7	Plastic: Remaking Our World	29 October 2022 – 5 February 2023	
8	Tartan	1 April 2023 – 14 January 2024	
9	Kimono: Kyoto to Catwalk	4 May 2024 – 5 January 2025	
10	Garden Futures: Designing with Nature	17 May 2025 – 25 January 2026	
11	Catwalk: The Art of the Fashion Show	3 April 2026 – 17 February 2027	

=== Scottish Design Galleries ===
The Scottish Design Galleries feature around 300 objects ranging from architecture to fashion, healthcare to furniture, and engineering to video game design. The exhibits are drawn from the V&A’s collections of art, design and performance, as well as museums, private collections and designers across Scotland and the world.

=== Stories from the Building ===
As part of the fifth anniversary celebrations, a new permanent exhibition, Stories from the Building, opened on the ground floor which features artefacts from the construction, a model of the museum and an interactive display board which features objects that were used in the construction of the museum from 2015.

=== The Oak Room ===
Charles Rennie Mackintosh's Oak Room was originally completed in 1908 after being commissioned by Catherine Cranston for use as a tearoom on Ingram Street in Glasgow. The 13.5-metre-long double-height room now forms a part of the permanent Scottish Design Gallery at the museum. The Oak Room was restored from over 700 original parts that had been stored by the Glasgow City Council for over 50 years. The room took 16 months to install, and the total cost of the restoration and conservation was £1.3 million (2018).

== List of directors ==
Tenure	Director
2018–2020	Phillip Long OBE
2020–present	Leonie Bell

== Reception ==
V&A Dundee has received mixed reviews. It had been praised for being Scotland's first design museum and opening interactive and cultural exhibitions such as the Hello Robot exhibition in 2019 and the Tartan exhibition in 2023. The museum was also named as one of the best places to visit in the world by TIME Magazine in 2019, winning the Scottish Design Award for Best Leisure / Culture Project in the same year. It was the subject of a profile in the Sky Arts programme The Art of Architecture. In 2020 the museum was nominated for European Museum of the Year. In 2022 the museum won the 'Building Brighter Futures Through Learning' award from the Family Learning Awards.

In the first few months after opening, the museum was also criticised by architects because of the amount of unused space; some called the building "alarming" for elderly visitors, "silly", and "boring".

As of October 2025, V&A Dundee is ranked 17th in a list of 141 things to do in Dundee on TripAdvisor, with an overall rating of 3.4.

The building has been featured in several tv productions, including 'Succession', 'Antiques Roadshow', 'The Repair Shop on the Road' and 'Secrets of the Museum'. A two-part series 'Icons of Style', presented by Kirsty Wark, aired on BBC in early 2025.

== Gallery ==
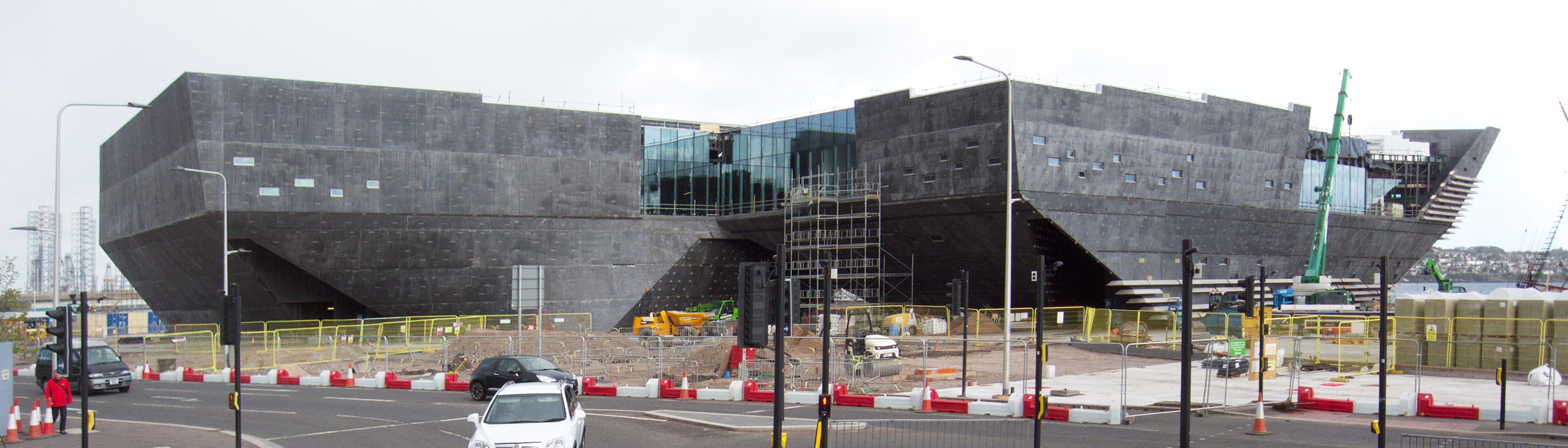
V&A Dundee under construction in 2017

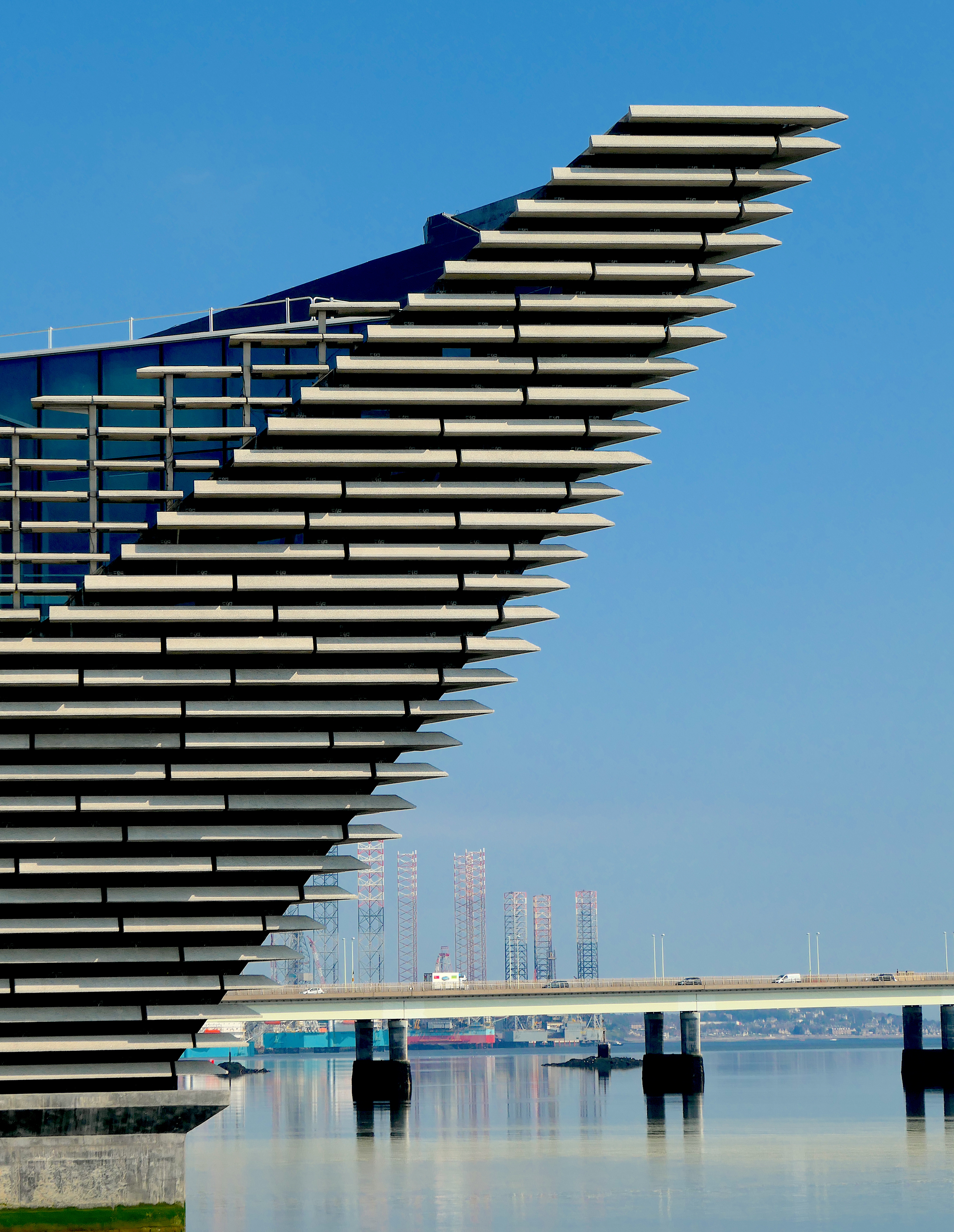
Detail of the building from the west

== See also ==
- List of design museums
- Victoria and Albert Museum § Partnerships
- List of art museums and galleries in Scotland
