= Damian Young =

American actor (born 1961)

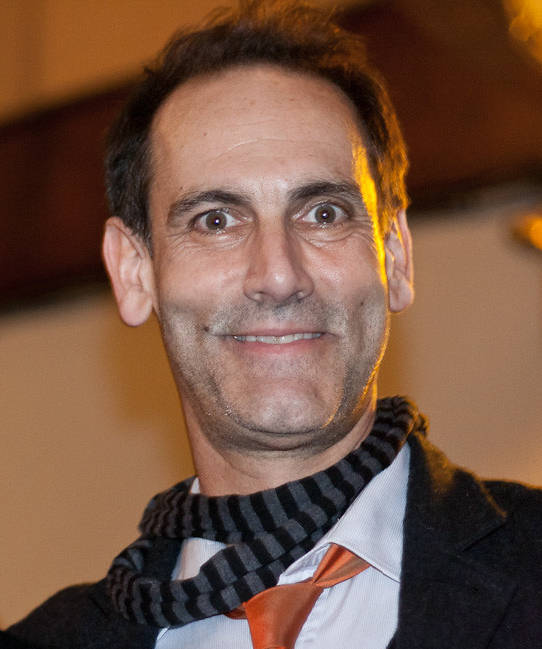
- Young in February 2012
- Born: October 27, 1961 (age 64); Washington, D.C., U.S.
- Occupation: Actor
- Years active: 1988–present
- Spouse: Welker White (m. 1990)
- Children: 2

Damian Young (born October 27, 1961) is an American actor notable for his appearance in the Hal Hartley film Amateur (1994). He also featured in Hartley's earlier film Simple Men (1992), and has appeared in theatre, television, and film. He played bus driver Stu Benedict for three seasons in The Adventures of Pete & Pete (1993–96), Mark Berman in the HBO series The Comeback, Bill Lewis on Californication, Aidan Macallan on House of Cards, and Gabriel in the 2014 film Birdman or (The Unexpected Virtue of Ignorance). Young played Jim Rattelsdorf for four seasons on the Netflix series Ozark, starring Jason Bateman and Laura Linney.

Young performed in productions with Allison Janney at Kenyon College.

== Filmography ==
Film
Year	Title	Role	Notes
1991	The Refrigerator	BBQ Party	
1992	Simple Men	Sheriff	
1994	Amateur	Edward	
1996	Dead Girl	Director	
1997	Chasing Amy	John Selleck	Uncredited
1998	Olympia	Ed Pedernales	
1998	The Object of My Affection	Romeo & Juliet director	
2000	Snow Day	Principal Ken Weaver	
2000	Unbreakable	Green Army-Jacketed Man	
2001	No Such Thing	Berger	
2002	G	Gene Underhill	
2002	The Guru	Hank, the Camera Man	
2003	Nola	Maitre d'	
2003	Kill the Poor	Delilah	
2006	Day on Fire	Mike	
2008	Sex and the City	Karl	
2009	The Good Heart	Roddie	
2009	Everybody's Fine	Jeff	
2010	Edge of Darkness	Senator Jim Pine	
2010	Twelve	Matt McCulloch	
2011	The Oranges	Gideon Allen	
2011	Red State	Agent Carol	
2012	Hello I Must Be Going	Larry	
2012	Hope Springs	Mike, The Innkeeper	
2012	Art Machine	Serge	
2013	Hair Brained	Spencer the Announcer	
2013	Delivery Man	Williams	
2014	Birdman or (The Unexpected Virtue of Ignorance)	Gabriel	
2016	Catfight	Stanley	
2017	Jack and Jill	Dick	Short
2017	Wonderstruck	Otto, Museum Guard	
2017	The Greatest Showman	Mr. Winthrop	
2018	Write When You Get Work	Paolo Manfredi	
2018	Ocean's 8	David Welch	
2018	We Only Know So Much	Gordon Copeland	
2018	Viper Club	Dulaney	
2019	Otherhood	Frank	
2020	I Care a Lot	Sam Rice	
2020	The Trial of the Chicago 7	Howard Ackerman	
2020	Antarctica	Dr. Blake	
2022	Pinball: The Man Who Saved the Game	Ben Chikofsky	
2022	The Independent	Rick Ackerman	
2024	The Luckiest Man in America	Kauffman	
2025	Fucktoys	Robert	

Television
Year	Title	Role	Notes
1993–1996	The Adventures of Pete & Pete	Stu Benedict	8 episodes
1997	Path to Paradise: The Untold Story of the World Trade Center Bombing	Crab Nebula Guy	TV movie
1998	New York Undercover	Jenkins	Episode: "Mob Street"
1999–2023	Law & Order	Various	6 episodes
1999	Law & Order: Special Victims Unit	Hampton Trill	Episode: "...Or Just Look Like One"
1999	Cosby	Howard	4 episodes
1999–2001	Third Watch	Various	3 episodes
2000	The War Next Door	Allan Kriegman	13 episodes
2001	100 Centre Street		Episode: "Domestic Abuses"
2002–2009	Law & Order: Criminal Intent	George Tate / Boaz / Mr. Wetherly	3 episodes
2004	The Jury	Evan Porter	Episode: "Lamentation on the Reservation"
2005–2006	CSI: Miami	Walter Resden	2 episodes
2005–2026	The Comeback	Mark Berman	29 episodes
2006	It’s Always Sunny in Philadelphia	Jack Stanford	Episode: "The Gang Runs for Office"
2006	As the World Turns	Dr. Ross Kreeger	6 episodes
2007–2009	Damages	Well Dressed Man	5 episodes
2007–2011	Californication	Bill Lewis	8 episodes
2008	Cashmere Mafia	Grant Normandy	Episode: "Conference Call"
2008	Numbers	Richard Taylor	Episode: "Breaking Point"
2008	Lipstick Jungle	Jim	Episode: "Chapter Five: Dressed to Kill"
2008	Canterbury's Law	Gabriel Waggett	Episode: "Sick as Your Secrets"
2011–2012	Pan Am	Mr. Bolger	2 episodes
2012	White Collar	Oliver Stringer	Episode: "Identity Crisis"
2012–2013	Person of Interest	Pete Matheson / Therapist	2 episodes
2013	Muhammad Ali's Greatest Fight	Ramsey Clark	TV movie
2014	The Blacklist	Milton Bobbit	Episode: "Milton Bobbit (No. 135)"
2015	Neon Joe, Werewolf Hunter	Doctor	5 episodes
2015–2016	The Good Wife	Clinton Foyle	3 episodes
2016	The Characters	Tom Reskin	Episode: "Kate Berlant"
2016–2017	House of Cards	Aidan Macallan	15 episodes
2016	Your Pretty Face Is Going to Hell	Satan	Episode: "Circle Jerk MCMCVIII"
2017	Elementary	Special Agent Breslin	Episode: "Crowned Clown, Downtown Brown"
2017	Difficult People	Neil Kaplan	Episode: "Fuzz Buddies"
2017	Gotham	Warden Reed	2 episodes
2018	Homeland	Jim	3 episodes
2018–2022	Ozark	Jim Rattelsdorf	19 episodes
2020	Shrill	Ron	2 episodes
2021	Prodigal Son	Jonah Shaw	Episode: "Speak of the Devil"
2021	Snowpiercer	Dr. Headwood	8 episodes
2022	Search Party	Bob Steelhead	Episode: "The Gospel of Judas"
2024	FBI: International	James Gaddis	Episode: "Death by Inches"
2025	The Diplomat	Governor Bob Synar	Episode: "The Riderless Horse"
2025	The Last Frontier	Doctor William Wigg	2 episodes
