= Olympic FC (disambiguation) =

Olympic FC is an Australian soccer team based in Brisbane.

Olympic FC may also refer to:

- Olympic F.C. (London), a defunct football club from London
- Olympic F.C. (Scotland), a defunct football club from Paisley, Scotland
- Adelaide Olympic FC, a soccer club based in Adelaide, Australia
- Canberra Olympic FC, a soccer club in Canberra, Australia
- Darwin Olympic SC, a soccer club in Darwin, Australia
- FC Olympic Varna, a soccer club in Varna, Bulgaria
- Hamilton Olympic FC, a soccer club in Newcastle, Australia
- Hobart Olympic, a previous name used by Olympia FC Warriors, a soccer club in Hobart, Australia
- Olympic Kingsway SC, a soccer club in Perth, Australia
- Olympic FC de Niamey, a football club in Niger
- Radcliffe Olympic F.C., a football club in Nottinghamshire, England
- Riverside Olympic FC, a soccer club in Launceston, Australia
- Sydney Olympic FC, a soccer club in Sydney, Australia

== See also ==
- Olympia FC (disambiguation)
- List of Greek Soccer clubs in Australia
