= Bismarck (footballer, born 1990) =

Brazilian footballer (1990–2026)

Personal information
- Full name: Bismarck Vinicyus Freire do Nascimento
- Date of birth: 25 August 1990
- Place of birth: Natal, Rio Grande do Norte, Brazil
- Date of death: 6 November 2026 (aged 36)
- Place of death: Natal, Rio Grande do Norte, Brazil
- Height: 1.77 m (5 ft 10 in)
- Position: Midfielder

Youth career
- 2006–2009: Fortaleza
- 2008: → Aracati (loan)

Senior career*
Years	Team	Apps	(Gls)
2008–2012	Fortaleza	109	(8)
2008	→ Horizonte (loan)	1	(0)
2010	→ Guarany de Sobral (loan)	12	(1)
2011	→ Santa Cruz (loan)	8	(1)
2011	→ Vila Nova (loan)	1	(0)
2012	→ Guarany de Sobral (loan)	17	(2)
2013	Espérance		
2013	Campinense	21	(2)
2013	Nacional-AM	5	(2)
2014	Paraná	0	(0)
2014	→ Rio Branco-PR (loan)	12	(2)
2014	Campinense	7	(2)
2015	Botafogo-PB	12	(0)
2015	Aparecidense	2	(2)
2016	CSA	32	(4)
2017–2018	Globo	52	(6)
2018	Vila Real-CE	6	(1)
2018	Floresta	3	(0)
2019	Juazeirense	2	(0)
2019–2020	Ríver	19	(1)
2019	→ Treze (loan)	6	(1)
2019	→ Timon (loan)	8	(1)
2020	Campinense	5	(0)
2020–2021	Fluminense-PI	19	(7)
2021	Juventude-MA	9	(0)
2021	Oeirense	9	(0)
2022–2023	Fluminense-PI	36	(2)
2024	Parnahyba	12	(1)
2024	Tocantinópolis	14	(2)
2025	Independente-PA	5	(0)
2025	Parnahyba	14	(4)
2025	Miramar de Cabedelo	8	(0)
2025–2026	Luminense	13	(2)
2026	Rio Branco-PR	8	(2)
2026	Parnahyba	5	(1)
- * Club domestic league appearances and goals

Bismarck Vinicyus Freire do Nascimento (25 August 1990 – 6 November 2026), simply known as Bismarck, was a Brazilian professional footballer who played as midfielder.

== Career ==
Born in Natal, Bismarck was a youth player at Fortaleza. In 2008, the same year as his professional debut, he played for the under-20 team that reached the quarter-finals of the Copa São Paulo de Futebol Júnior for the first time. His team won the Campeonato Cearense three consecutive times, and in 2010 while on loan to Guarany de Sobral, he won the Campeonato Brasileiro Série D, the first national title by a club from the state of Ceará.

In 2013, Bismarck had his only experience outside Brazil, at Espérance de Tunis. Later in the same year, he was one of the key players for Campinense as they won the Copa do Nordeste. With CSA in 2016, he was part of the side that won promotion to the Campeonato Brasileiro Série C as runners-up; he did the same the following year with Globo, in addition to finishing second in the Campeonato Potiguar in his home state of Rio Grande do Norte.

Later in his career, Bismarck played in the state of Piauí, where he won the Campeonato Piauiense with Ríver in 2019 and Fluminense-PI three years later. He played for over 30 clubs across Brazil; his last team was Parnahyba, and he had a deal to join Olímpia, newly promoted to the Campeonato Maranhense for 2027.

== Death ==
On 6 November 2026, Bismarck was killed inside a bar in Natal's Cidade Alta neighborhood. After he and a male patron had argued beforehand over a woman, the patron left the bar and then returned with a gun, shooting both Bismarck and another man. Bismarck was taken to a hospital where he died from his injuries. He was 36 years old.

== Honours ==
Fortaleza

- Campeonato Cearense: 2008, 2009, 2010

Guarany de Sobral

- Campeonato Brasileiro Série D: 2010

Campinense

- Copa do Nordeste: 2013

Ríver

- Campeonato Piauiense: 2019

Fluminense-PI

- Campeonato Piauiense Second Division: 2020
- Campeonato Piauiense: 2022

Oeirense

- Campeonato Piauiense Second Division: 2021

Luminense

- Campeonato Maranhense Second Division: 2025
