= Kemalpaşa =

- District and municipality
- Map showing Kemalpaşa District in İzmir Province

- Location in Turkey Kemalpaşa (İzmir)
- Coordinates: 38°25′40″N 27°24′58″E
- Country: Turkey
- Province: İzmir

Government
  - Mayor: Rıdvan Karakayalı (CHP)
- Area: 681 km^{2} (263 sq mi)
- Population (2022): 114,250
  - Density: 168/km^{2} (435/sq mi)
- Time zone: UTC+3 (TRT)
- Area code: 0232
- Website: www.izmir-kemalpasa.bel.tr

Kemalpaşa is a municipality and district of İzmir Province, Turkey. Its area is 681 km^{2}, and its population is 114,250 (2022). Kemalpaşa town is 29 km (18 mi) from the historical and traditional center of İzmir, (Konak) and has high levels of development in terms of industry and services. İzmir-Ankara highway crosses the district area 8 km (5.0 mi) to the north of the district center. Kemalpaşa district borders the district Bornova to the west, Yunusemre, Şehzadeler and Turgutlu (Manisa Province) in the north and east, and İzmir's districts of Torbalı and Bayındır in the south. The eastern and southern parts of Kemalpaşa district preserve their markedly rural characteristics, which results in an urbanization rate of only 25.7 for the district area as a whole, despite the presence of a strong industrial base in and to the west of Kemalpaşa town. Kemalpaşa's very large organized industrial zone (KOSBİ) brings together producers of construction materials, rubber and plastic goods, textiles and clothing, leather, paper, packaging materials, machinery and other equipment, including electrical tools and installations, dyes and other chemical substances, marble and car parts, as well as foundries and other metalworks. Agriculture also occupies a portion with high added value in Kemalpaşa's economy, its cherries being of nationwide renown (known as Kemalpaşa kirazı in Turkish) and exported. Literacy is at a high level at 90%, and the neighboring Bornova, where Ege University is based, serves as a nearby pool in terms of trained personnel.

== Administration ==
A township depending on the sanjak (subprovince) of Saruhan (Manisa) until the late-Ottoman times, the town was attached to the subprovince of İzmir in 1900 and a municipal administration was constituted the year after.

There are 49 neighbourhoods in Kemalpaşa District:

- 8 Eylül
- Akalan
- Ansızca
- Armutlu 85. Yıl Cumhuriyet
- Armutlu Hürriyet
- Aşağı Yenmiş
- Aşağıkızılca
- Atatürk
- Bağyurdu 29 Ekim
- Bağyurdu Kazımpaşa
- Bağyurdu Kemal Atatürk
- Bağyurdu Yeni
- Bayosb
- Bayramlı
- Beşpınar
- Çambel
- Çınarköy
- Çiniliköy
- Cumalı
- Damlacık
- Dereköy
- Gökçeyurt
- Gökyaka
- Hamzababa
- Kamberler
- Kızılüzüm
- Kuyucak
- Mehmet Akif Ersoy
- Nazarköy
- Ören 75. Yıl Cumhuriyet
- Ören Egemen
- Örnekköy
- Ovacık
- Sarıçalı
- Sarılar
- Sinancılar
- Soğukpınar
- Sütçüler
- Ulucak Cumhuriyet
- Ulucak İstiklal
- Ulucak Mustafa Kemal Atatürk
- Vişneli
- Yenikurudere
- Yenmiş
- Yeşilköy
- Yeşilyurt
- Yiğitler
- Yukarıkızılca Merkez
- Zeamet

== History ==
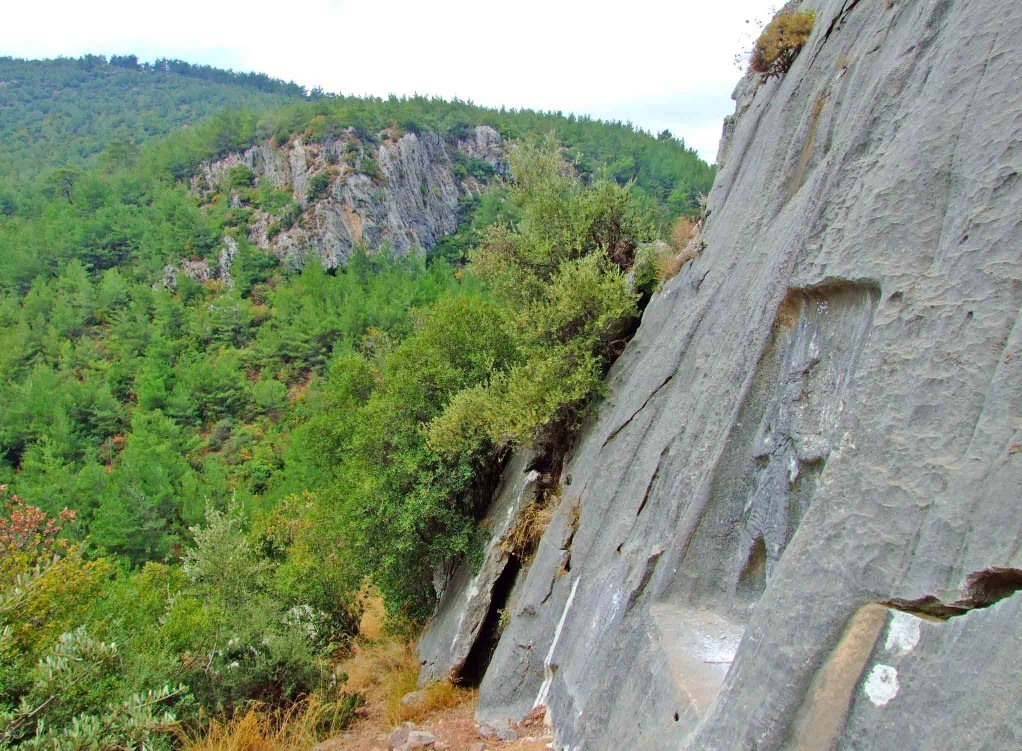
Karabel relief

Kemalpaşa region has always been a key point of passage between the Gulf of İzmir and the lands of the Anatolian interior. The recorded history dates back to 1300 BC. The Karabel relief depicting a Hittite warrior was until recently the only trace of that civilization discovered in western Anatolia. The recent discovery and the explorations that are currently being conducted in the prehistoric mound (höyük) near the depending municipality of Ulucak (Ulucak Höyüğü), is likely to shed new lights to the region's earlier history. There are also numerous tumuli in the Lydian style in the region.

=== Karabel Hittite-Luwian rock relief ===
The relief is a late Hittite-Luwian rock relief about 1.5 meter wide and 2.5 meters high and located in a passage between two mountains on the road south to Torbalı at a distance of six kilometers from Kemalpaşa center. It is dated to the second half of the 13th century BCE during the reign of Tudhaliya IV. A male figure depicted standing with a bow in his right hand and a spear in his left wearing a tunic and a cone-shaped hat is identified as Tarkasnawa, King of Mira, according to a recent reading by David Hawkins, widely approved by scholars and matched with a name mentioned in Hattusa Hittite annals. The relief is called "Eti Baba" (the Hittite father) locally.

=== Nymphaion – Nif – Kemalpaşa ===
“Its fortress is a strongly built edifice on a steep rock and has five corners, the circumference measuring two thousand and two hundred steps and it has two gates, and ice-cold waters flow from the domes built under these. It is not possible to reach one's hands comfortably to take a third bowl of water.”

— Evliya Çelebi, 17th century Turkish traveller on Nif

The town's name in classical and medieval times was Nymphaion (Greek: Νύμφαιον). It rose to prominence during the late Byzantine times, when it became the favourite winter residence of the Nicaean emperors during the 13th century. A palace, whose well-preserved remains are still extant, was built there by John III Doukas Vatatzes. The association with the Nicaean court made Nymphaion a center of imperial politics: the city was raised to an archbishopric, where John III spent his final months, and both Theodore II Laskaris and Michael VIII Palaiologos were crowned. The two 13th-century important treaties in 1214 and 1261 both referred to as Treaty of Nymphaeum were concluded there with the Italian states. The latter was to have an important impact on the region's future, virtually ceding Smyrna to the Republic of Genoa. In the last decades of the 13th century, it became a major Byzantine stronghold against the advances of the Turkish beyliks: both emperor Andronikos II Palaiologos and the celebrated general Alexios Philanthropenos used it as their headquarters in the 1290s. The town fell to the Turkish Bey of Saruhan in 1315. In April of the following year, the archbishop Theodoulos of Nymphaeum was forced to flee the city because of the Sarukhanids and assumed the archbishopric of Derkoi.

[Theodoulos] having been banished from his allotted [seat] because of the spiteful abuse [of the Turks] arising from our sins, and is [now] idle... was appointed to administer the archbishopric of Dercus in Europe.

From 1867 until 1922, Nif was part of Aidin Vilayet.

Under Turkish rule, the town's original name was echoed in the Turkish name "Nif" which was in use until the early years of the Republic of Turkey. The name Nif was changed to Kemalpaşa in honor of Mustafa Kemal Paşa who had spent the night of 9 September 1922 here, before the closing chapter of the Occupation of Smyrna the next day, putting an end to the Greco-Turkish War (1919–1922) in the field. The name "Nif" is no longer used for the city, even colloquially, although its status of former name is common knowledge. Nif was one of the centers that were densely populated by Anatolian Greeks till the first quarter of the 20th century, before the Exchange of Greek and Turkish Populations.

The mountain on the slopes of which the city of Kemalpaşa extends and the district's most important stream are still called Nif (respectively, Nif Dağı and Nif Çayı). With its summit reaching 1,510 meters high, Mount Nif was one of the mountains called Olympus in ancient times and is renowned today for its dense forests of oaks, oleasters, pines and other trees of the Aegean basin, cold springs and trout farms. The River Nif enters the district area near the township of Ulucak, crosses the plain to skip tangentially into the area of the neighboring district of Bornova, at which level a Roman bridge is found, rejoins Kemalpaşa to flow into Gediz River further north near Manisa.

== Industry and professions ==
Industrial Zone name	Year opened	Area (ha)	Nr. of enterprises	Exports	Employment	Vacant space
KOSBİ	1990	1,030	236	1.9 m USD	19,200	83 %
Kemalpaşa Small Ind.Zone	1989	2	60	n/a	n/a	5 %

There are 306 large industrial enterprises based in Kemalpaşa district and the share of the population employed directly or indirectly in industrial activities reaches 60%. The organized industrial zone KOSBİ gathers on its own 236 large enterprises, 7 with full and 41 with partial foreign capital.

The total number of companies based in Kemalpaşa district is 14,831. 463 of these are enterprises active in industrial sectors and 183 are registered exporters, the rest being accounted by establishments oriented towards services or agriculture. 8 banks are present in Kemalpaşa district with a total of 9 branches.

== Cherries, livestock breeding, and forestry ==
The share of the population in Kemalpaşa district who pull their income from agriculture or animal breeding is 60%. Kemalpaşa region is well known for its cherries (Kemalpaşa kirazı in Turkish). 9 cooperatives set up for purposes of irrigation regulation and 6 others with agricultural development as objective bring together 3,137 persons. A large part of the land in Kemalpaşa district (1,310 hectares) is irrigated or has the infrastructure for regular irrigation, which explains the primary place occupied by maize among the grains produced, making Kemalpaşa an exceptional case in western Anatolia. The Union of Cherry Producers has 177 members, mostly large-scale producers. 1,594,600 cherry trees in total produced 47,838 tonnes of fruit in 2006 for Kemalpaşa. The increase compared to 2002 in the number of trees was 71.9% and in production 106.3%.

At about 2,500 hectares each, the respective shares of agricultural lands and forests in Kemalpaşa are roughly equal. Among the lands used for agriculture, fruit orchards, principally cherries, take the lead at 33% (758 hectares), with olive trees (22%, 400 hectares) and vineyards (16%, 370 hectares) following. The portion occupied by vineyards and grains more than halved between 2000 and 2006, while the land used for the production of cherries doubled. Since cherries are relatively easier to maintain and process, and a large national and export market exists, their production increasingly attracts the attention of urban-based and hobby-minded producers who would assure the daily care outside the collect typically through the offices of one villager. There is also a growing tendency towards diversification in the vegetables produced, new breeds in demand by İzmir's customer base and previously unheard of like broccolis, asparagus, soybeans, kiwis, kakis, also making their appearance. The level of mechanisation in agricultural activities is high and well above the national averages.

Livestock	2002	2006	Increase (%)
Bovine animals	13,821	17,780	28.6
Ovine animals	12,622	14,085	11.6
Chicken	1,352,100	1,808,700	33.8
Turkey	54,130	240,200	343.7

There are about 200 large dairies, poultries or livestock breeding farms across the district area, catering İzmir's huge market. The quantity of milk produced in Kemalpaşa in 2007 was 38,065 tonnes. There are 345,000 beehives and 345 tonnes honey and 10 tonnes of beeswax was produced in 2007.

Kemalpaşa center has an open market (bazaar) area covering 8,000 square meters, and the depending townships of Ulucak 3,000 and Armutlu 2,000 square meters, where local and rural products are sold. Outside KOSBİ industrial zone, firms established in Kemalpaşa realized exports reaching 260 million US Dollars in 2006, principally products of agriculture such as cherries, peaches, raisins and olive oil.

== Social life ==
Kemalpaşa's proximity to İzmir and the tendency of the population to head for the big city for activities of social life becomes a factor which plays against Kemalpaşa district center in terms of the availability on the spot of social facilities. While the mountain passage at Karabel where the Hittite monument is located has been arranged into a picnic area and the remains of Vatatzes's palace could attract more visitors, the absence of facilities for overnight visitors tend to limit Kemalpaşa's tourism potential to daily visits or excursions by trekking or hunting groups.

One popular spot at a distance of a few kilometers to Kemalpaşa center is the "Kazakh Valley" or "Kımız Farm", located near the forests on the slopes of the Mount Nif and arranged around Central Asian themes, complete with a yurt built in concrete, serving Kazakh/Uzbek food and reputed to have one of the best offers of the ancestral drink kımız in Turkey. The stock farm within the establishment provide visitors or accomplished riders with the opportunity to ride Haflinger horses.

== See also ==
- Ege University Observatory at Kurudağ
