= Mount Nif =

Mountain in Turkey

- (one among several Mt. Olympus in antiquity)
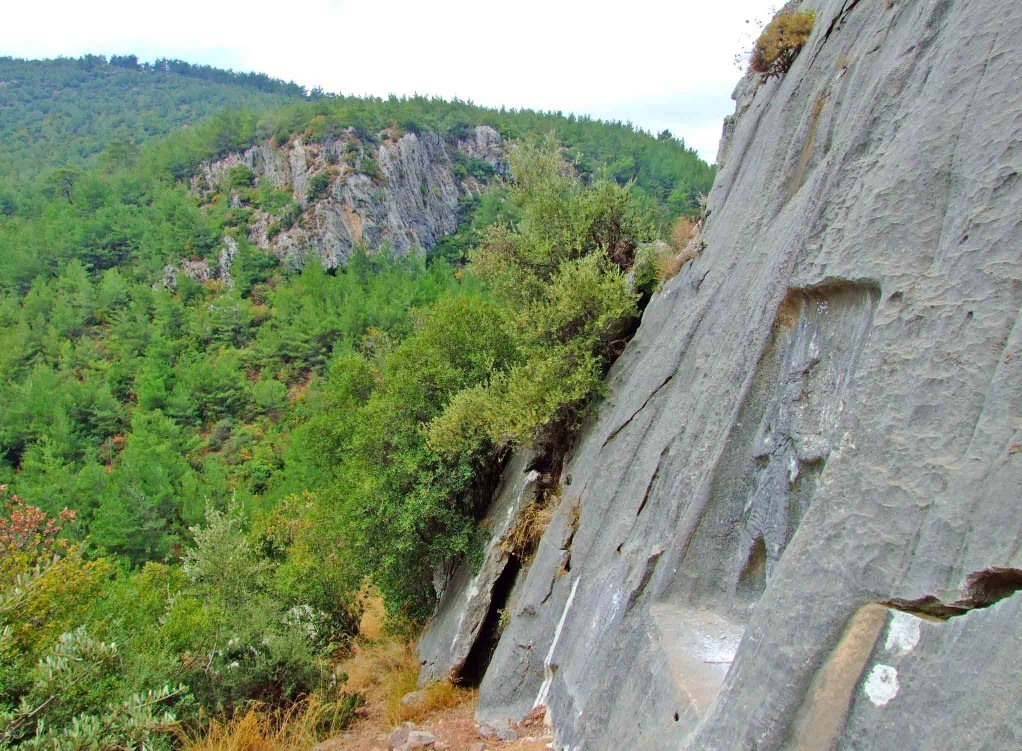
- Luvian warrior prince monument carved in rock dated to late-13th century BC at Karabel Pass on Mount Nif

Highest point
- Elevation: 1,510 m (4,950 ft)see section
- Coordinates: 38°17′58″N 27°1′8″E

Geography
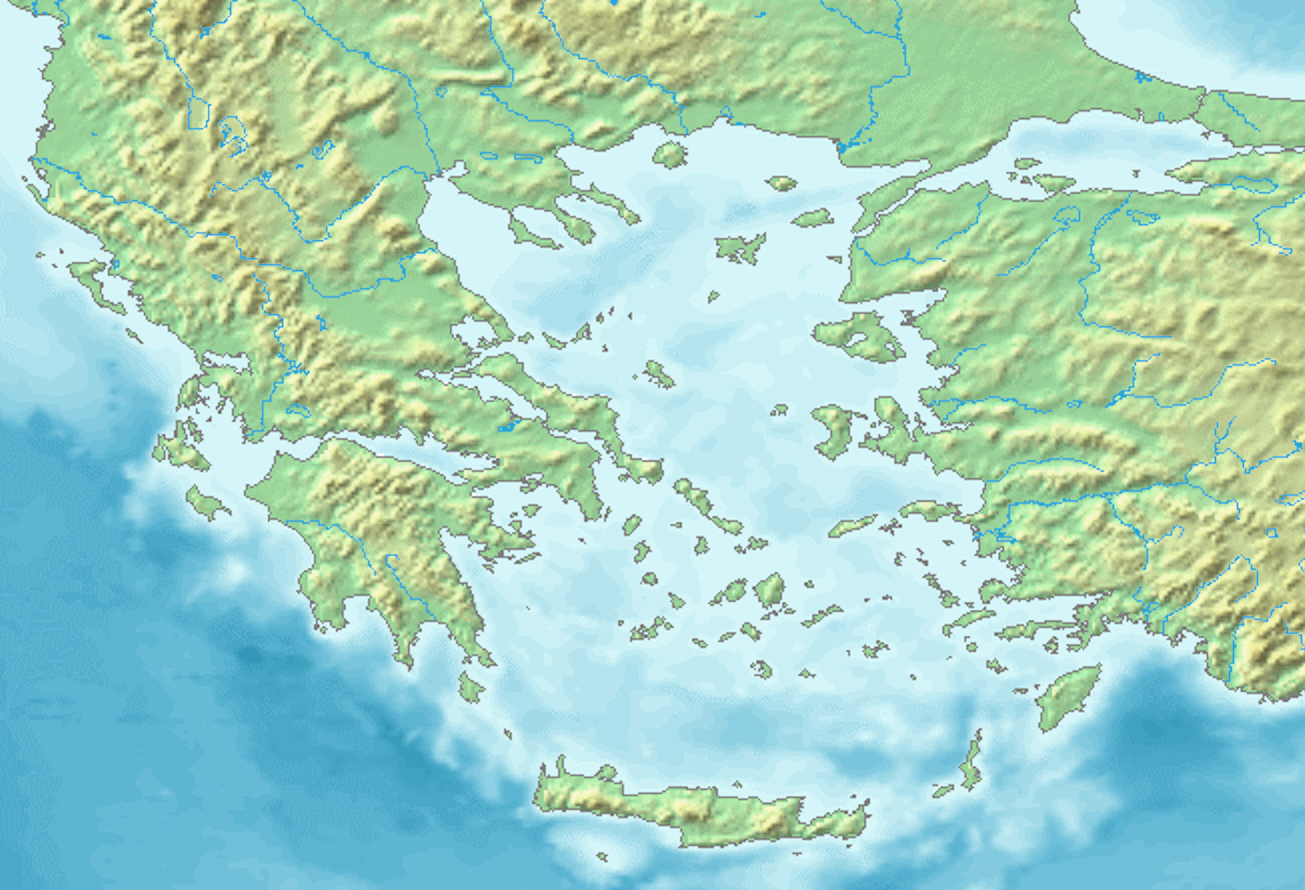
- Location within Turkey Location within Aegean Sea
- Location: Kemalpaşa, İzmir, Turkey

Mount Nif, Turkish: Nif Dağı, (elevation: 1,510 m or 4,954 ft) is a mountain in the district of Kemalpaşa, towering over the district center (formerly also called Nif), located immediately to the east of the city of İzmir, in western Turkey. It was one of the nineteen mountains which carried the name Olympus in ancient times.

Mount Nif's mass is a protrusion in western direction of Bozdağlar mountain chain, which separates the valleys of the rivers Gediz and Küçük Menderes, two principal flows of the region, and of which the Mount Bozdağ (Mount Tmolus in antiquity), with its elevation exceeding 2,000 m (6,562 ft), constitutes the highest peak, as well as being the highest point for the same region of the provinces of İzmir-Aydın-Manisa-Uşak as a whole.

Mount Nif is distinguished from the rest of the mountain chain massif by a narrow but key pass at a locality called Karabel which leads south towards the town of Torbalı.

Karabel Pass is famous for its Luvian warrior prince monument carved in rock and dated to late-13th century BC, inscribed in the name of Tarkasnawa, a younger contemporary and an addressee of the Hittite King Tudhaliya IV. A new reading of its relief inscription, which had been known since the 19th century, was made in 1996 and published in 1998. The monument is called "Eti Baba" (the Hittite father) locally.

A second pass to the north of Mount Nif separates it, or connects it, since it is still at some altitude, from Mount Sipylus, at the locality called Belkahve. Belkahve is the principal point of access from the east to İzmir metropolitan area and commands an impressive view of a large part of the city. Ankara-İzmir highway, notably, is checked by its sinuous slopes.

Mount Nif is sometimes cited as "Kemalpaşa Mountain" in reference to the district center, especially in Turkish sources. But the name "Mount Nif", deriving from "Nymphaion", the name of the region during the Byzantine period when it was an important and imperial center especially at the time of the Nicaean Empire, is the more common appellation in Turkey as well. This is also the case for the principal stream that crosses the district area, the "River Nif" (Nif Çayı). The district center and the depending administrative area almost invariably go by the name of "Kemalpaşa", with the former name used very rarely nowadays and only colloquially.

== See also ==
- Luvians

== Sources ==
- J. David Hawkins (2009), "The Arzawa letters in recent perspective" (PDF), British Museum Studies in Ancient Egypt and Sudan, 14, British Museum: 73–83
- Ekrem Akurgal (2002). Ancient Civilisations and Ruins of Turkey. Kegan Paul. ISBN 978-0-7103-0776-7.
- George E. Bean (1967). Aegean Turkey: An archaeological guide. Ernest Benn, London. ISBN 978-0-510-03200-5.
