= Armutlu, Kemalpaşa =

Armutlu
- Settlement
- Location within Turkey
- Coordinates: 38°24′10″N 27°31′55″E
- Country: Turkey
- Region: Aegean
- Province: İzmir
- District: Kemalpaşa

Population (2007)
  - Total: 7,257
- Time zone: UTC+3 (TRT)
- Area code: 0232

Armutlu is a large town and former municipality in the Kemalpaşa district of İzmir Province, Turkey, in Turkey's Aegean Region. It was merged into the municipality of Kemalpaşa in 2008. Its population was 7,257 in 2007.
