= List of art museums and galleries in Scotland =

Name	Image	Town/City	County/City Council
Aberdeen Art Gallery		Aberdeen	Aberdeen
Aberdeen Arts Centre		Aberdeen	Aberdeen
An Lanntair		Stornoway	Outer Hebrides
Balmoral Castle		Royal Deeside	Aberdeenshire
Broughton Gallery		Broughton	Scottish Borders
Burrell Collection		Pollock	Glasgow
Callendar House		Falkirk	Falkirk (council area)
CCA Glasgow		Glasgow City Centre	Glasgow
Chambers Institution		Peebles	Scottish Borders
Dean Gallery		Edinburgh	Lothian
The Drill Hall		Edinburgh	Lothian
Duff House		Banff	Aberdeenshire
Dundee Contemporary Arts		Dundee	Dundee
Dunfermline Museum and Art Gallery		Dunfermline	Fife
Fine Art Society		New Town, Edinburgh	Edinburgh
Fruitmarket Gallery			Edinburgh
Gallery of Modern Art		Glasgow City Centre	Glasgow
Glasgow Print Studio			Glasgow
Glasgow School of Art			Glasgow
Glenkiln Sculpture Park			Dumfries and Galloway
Hospitalfield House		Arbroath	Angus
Hunterian Museum and Art Gallery		University of Glasgow	Glasgow
Kellie Castle		Arncroach	Fife
Kelvin Hall		Glasgow West End	Glasgow
Kelvingrove Art Gallery and Museum		Glasgow West End	Glasgow
Kirkcaldy Museum and Art Gallery		Kirkcaldy	Fife
Lennoxlove House		Haddington	East Lothian
Mclean Museum		Greenock	Inverclyde
McLellan Galleries		Glasgow City Centre	Glasgow
McManus Galleries			Dundee
Macrobert		University of Stirling	Stirling
Meffan Institute		Forfar	Angus
Montrose Museum		Montrose	Angus
Old Gala House		Galashiels	Scottish Borders
Paxton House		Paxton	Scottish Borders
Peacock Visual Arts, Aberdeen			Aberdeen
Perth Art Gallery		Perth	Perth and Kinross
Pier Arts Centre		Stormness	Orkney
Playfair Project			Edinburgh
Royal Glasgow Institute of the Fine Arts			Glasgow
Royal Scottish Academy Building		The Mound	Edinburgh
Scottish Flair Victorian Art Gallery		Inverness	Scottish Highlands
Scottish National Gallery		The Mound	Edinburgh
Scottish National Gallery of Modern Art			Edinburgh
Scottish National Portrait Gallery			Edinburgh
Sharmanka Kinetic Gallery			Glasgow
St Mungo Museum of Religious Life and Art			Glasgow
Tramway (arts centre)		Pollokshields	Glasgow
Stirling Smith Museum and Art Gallery			Stirling
Stills Centre for Photography			Edinburgh
Talbot Rice Gallery		University of Edinburgh	Edinburgh
Weisdale Mill		Weisdale	Shetland

== See also ==
- Museums Galleries Scotland
- National Galleries of Scotland
