= Olimpija =

Olimpija may refer to:

- Olimpija Liepāja (1926–1940), a football club in Liepāja, Latvia
- Olimpija Ljubljana (disambiguation), several sports clubs in Ljubljana, Slovenia
- Olimpija Osijek, a football club in Osijek, Croatia
- Olimpija Rīga (1992–1995), a football club in Riga, Latvia
