= Olympus (sculpture) =

Public art work by Charles Ginnever

Coordinates: 43°10′33.6″N 87°56′17.1″W

- Artist: Charles Ginnever
- Year: 1976
- Type: weathering steel
- Location: Lynden Sculpture Garden; Milwaukee, Wisconsin
- Owner: Bradley Family Foundation

Olympus is a public art work by American artist Charles Ginnever located at the Lynden Sculpture Garden near Milwaukee, Wisconsin. The sculpture is an abstract made of weathering steel arranged in triangular shapes which rise successively in height; it is installed on the lawn.
