= Olympias (disambiguation) =

Olympias (c. 375–316 BC) was the fourth wife of Philip II of Macedon and mother of Alexander the Great.

Olympias may also refer to:

== People ==
- Olympias II of Epirus, 3rd century BC queen and regent of Epirus
- Olympias of Thebes, Greek medical writer and midwife
- Olympias (Herodian) (fl. 1st century BC), daughter of Herod the Great
- Olympias of Armenia (died 361), Christian Roman noblewoman, one of the wives of King Arsaces II (Arshak II) of Armenia
- Olympias (sister of Praetorian prefect Seleucus), Seleucus being the father of Olympias the Deaconess
- Olympias the Deaconess (ca. 361/368–408), Christian Roman saint and noblewoman, niece of Olympias of Armenia
- Olympias (daughter of Robert Guiscard), 11th-century fiancée of the Byzantine co-emperor Constantine Doukas

== Sports teams ==
- Olympias Frenarou, a volleyball team based in Frenaros, Famagusta District, Cyprus
- Olympias Lympion, a football club based in Lympia, Cyprus
- A.E.P. Olympias Patras, a multi-sport club in Patras, Greece
  - Olympias Patras B.C., a professional basketball club

== Other uses ==
- Olympias (trireme), a reconstruction of an ancient Athenian trireme
- Olympias (Thessaly), a town in ancient Thessaly
- Olympias mine, in northern Greece
- Olympias, the moon of asteroid 317 Roxane
