= Olympia FC =

Olympia F.C. may refer to:

- Olympia FC Warriors, an Australian soccer team based in Hobart which plays in the National Premier Leagues Tasmania
- Olympia F.C. (Dublin), a former League of Ireland team
- Olympia F.C., an American soccer team that entered the National Challenge Cup during the 1920s

== See also ==
- Olympia București a football club based in Bucharest, Romania
- Olympic FC (disambiguation)
