= Olímpia Esporte Clube =

- Manager: Danilo Brito
- League: Campeonato Maranhense
- 2026: Campeonato Maranhense Série B, 1st (promoted)

Olímpia Esporte Clube is a Brazilian professional football club from São Luís in the state of Maranhão. The club competes in the Campeonato Maranhense, the top tier of football in the state.

== History ==
The club was founded as Real Resenha, an amateur club from the Cidade Olímpica neighbourhood in São Luís. The club won the city's main amateur cup in 2020.

In 2026, Real Resenha entered professional football by joining the Campeonato Maranhense Série B, the second tier of football in Maranhão, by using the registration of Araioses. On 25 July, the club won the final 2–1 against Lago Verde, with Mikeias scoring both goals in a comeback victory. The team finished its first season of professional football unbeaten, with seven wins and three draws, 13 goals scored and three conceded.

On 13 October 2026, ahead of playing in the top-tier Campeonato Maranhense in the new year, the club renamed itself Olímpia Esporte Clube and renewed the contract of manager Danilo Brito. Veteran midfielder Bismarck was the first player signed in preparation, but he was fatally shot on 6 November.
