= Olimpija Ljubljana =

Olimpija Ljubljana may refer to:

- HDD Olimpija Ljubljana, an ice hockey club dissolved in 2017
- HK Olimpija, a current ice hockey club
- KK Cedevita Olimpija, a basketball club formed in 2019
- KK Olimpija, a defunct basketball club
- NK Olimpija Ljubljana, an association football club established in 2005 as NK Bežigrad
- NK Olimpija Ljubljana (1945–2005), a defunct association football club
- RK Olimpija, a women's handball club
- ŽNK Olimpija Ljubljana, a women's football club
