= 6–3 school system =

Chinese education system

The 6–3 school system is an education system used in China.

== Origin ==
The 6–3 school system in China originated from the "6–3–3 school system" in the United States in the 1820s. The American system has six years of primary school, followed by three years of junior high school, and finally ending with three years in high school. In 1922, the Beiyang government issued the School System Reform Order and established the Renxu school system.

== Notability ==
With a long history, it is the most dominant school system of compulsory education in mainland China.

== Advantages ==
Children going to school at an early age learn lifelong skills beneficial towards child development. Basic school tools like scissors and pencils are not much of a necessity, and the government considers this portion of the schedule to be of low priority. The junior high era pays attention to the predetermined curriculum so that students quickly grasp the system of cultural and scientific knowledge. In this particular time period, the student begins to take responsibility of their actions. As preparation for the high school years, the student grows emotionally, cognitively, and physically to maximize academic potential.

== Disadvantages ==
Because too much time is spent in primary school, the junior high school curriculum crams too much knowledge into a short amount of time. With only three years to learn the concepts of the junior high school syllabus and textbooks, the student is overwhelmed.
