= Olympus =

Olympus or Olympos (Ancient Greek: Ὄλυμπος) may refer to:

== Mountains ==
=== In antiquity ===
==== Greece ====
- Mount Olympus in Thessaly and Macedonia, northern Greece, the home of the twelve gods of Olympus in Greek mythology
- Mount Olympus (Lesvos), located in Lesbos
- Mount Olympus (Euboea), located in Euboea
- Mount Olympus (Attica), located in East Attica
- Mount Olympus (Skyros), located in Skyros
- Mount Lykaion, located in Arcadia

==== Turkey ====
- Mysian Olympus (present-day Uludağ), in northwest Turkey
- Paphlagonian Olympus (present-day Arıt Dağı near Bartın)
- Mount Nif (present-day Nif Dağı in Aegean Turkey)
- Lycian Olympus (present-day Tahtalı Dağı near Kemer)

==== Cyprus ====
- Mount Olympus (Cyprus), the highest point (1952 m) on the island of Cyprus

=== In modern times ===
==== United States ====
- Mount Olympus (Washington), on the Olympic Peninsula
- Mount Olympus (Utah), on the Wasatch Front
- Mount Olympus (San Francisco), in the Ashbury Heights neighborhood

==== New Zealand ====
- Mount Olympus, the 2,096-meter mountain range, which contains Mount Olympus Ski Area, located in the South Island of New Zealand

==== Solar System ====
- Olympus Mons (Mars), the tallest known volcano and mountain in the Solar System

== Communities ==
=== Greece ===
- Olympos, Karpathos, a town on the island of Karpathos
- Dio-Olympos, Pieria, a municipal unit in the foothills of the mythic Mount Olympus

=== Turkey ===
- Olympos (Lycia), village in the heart of the Olympos coastal national park

=== United States ===
- Mount Olympus, Los Angeles, a neighborhood in the Hollywood Hills, California
- Mount Olympus, Indiana, an unincorporated place
- Mount Olympus, Utah, a census-designated place

== Business ==
- Olympus Corporation, a Japanese medical and scientific solution company, that previously produced optics and imaging (cameras)
- OM Digital Solutions, formed when Olympus Corporation split off its photography and audio recording businesses
- Olympus tension leg platform, an oil rig in the Gulf of Mexico
- Rolls-Royce Olympus, a jet engine and marine turbine
- Mt. Olympus Water & Theme Park, Wisconsin Dells, Wisconsin
- Olympus, a codename for the third version of phpBB, phpBB3

== Entertainment ==
- Olympos (novel), a science fiction novel by American author Dan Simmons
- Olympus Rally, a motorsport event in the Washington State, USA
- Olympus (Marvel Comics), a fictional location in Marvel Comics
- Olympus (TV series), a 2015 Canadian fantasy television series
- Mount Olympus, a major location in the 1997 Disney animated film Hercules

== Other ==
- Olympus (musician), two semi-mythical musicians from the time of Ancient Greece
- Olympus (son of Heracles), son of Heracles and Euboea in Greek mythology
- Olympus (sculpture), a public artwork by Charles Ginnever in Milwaukee, Wisconsin, US
- Olympus High School, a high school in Utah, USA
- USS Mount Olympus (AGC-8), a World War II US Navy ship
- Olympus-1, damaged and decommissioned communications satellite
- Optare Olympus, a British double-decker bus
- Olympus, a New Zealand company sailing ship the brought 159 settlers to Wellington, New Zealand, in 1840
- Olympus, an alternate name for Bigelow Aerospace's BA 2100 spacecraft
- FC Olimp Ungheni, the name of the Moldovan football club CS Moldova-03 Ungheni during 2008–2011

== See also ==
- Olympe (disambiguation)
- Olympia (disambiguation)
