= Olympe (disambiguation) =

Olympe is an ancient Greek city in the region of Epirus. Its location is probably at modern Mavrovë.

Olympe may also refer to:

- Olympe (singer), French singer famous after coming runner-up in season 2 of French The Voice: la plus belle voix
- Olympe de Gouges (1748–1793), born Marie Gouze, French playwright and political activist with feminist and abolitionist writings
- Olympe Aguado (1827–1894), Franco-Spanish photographer and socialite
- Olympe Audouard (1832–1890), French feminist
- Olympe Bhêly-Quénum (born 1928), Beninese writer, journalist and magazine editor
- Olympe Bradna (1920–2012), French dancer and actress
- Olympe Pélissier (1799-1878), French artists' model and the second wife of the Italian composer Gioachino Rossini

== Fictional characters ==
- Olympe Maxime, headmistress of Beauxbatons, the French wizarding school in Harry Potter

== See also ==
- Olympia (disambiguation)
- Olympus (disambiguation)
- Cyprienne Dubernet (aka Madame Olympe Hériot and later Mrs Roger Douine) (1857–1945), French patron and philanthropist
- Olympia Mancini (in French Olympe Mancini) (1638-1708), Countess of Soissons and one of the celebrated Mancini sisters, known as the Mazarinettes
- Olympe-Philippe Gerbet (1798-1864), French Catholic bishop and writer
