= Olympia (2018 drama film) =

2018 American documentary film

- Directed by: Gregory Dixon
- Written by: McKenzie Chinn
- Produced by: McKenzie Chinn; Gregory Dixon; Lucy Lola Manda; Elliott Lonsdale
- Starring: McKenzie Chinn; Charles Andrew Gardner; Ericka Ratcliff; LaNisa Renee Frederick; Penelope Walker
- Cinematography: Christopher Vinopal
- Edited by: Bernard Lewandowski; Sally O'Brien
- Music by: Josh Coffey; Otto Sharp
- Production companies: 30 Pictures; The Line Film Company
- Distributed by: Cow Lamp Films
- Release date: 22 September 2018 (USA)
- Running time: 93 minutes
- Country: USA
- Language: English

Olympia is a 2018 American romantic drama film directed by Gregory Dixon as his directorial debut. Co-produced by Dixon, writer-actress McKenzie Chinn, Lucy Lola Manda, Sarah Sharp, and Elliott Lonsdale for 30 Pictures. The film stars McKenzie Chinn in the title role whereas Charles Andrew Gardner, Ericka Ratcliff, LaNisa Renee Frederick and Penelope Walker make supportive roles.

The film received positive reviews and won several awards at international film festivals. It had its premier on 22 September 2018 at the Los Angeles Film Festival. Then it was screened on 15 October 2018 at Chicago International Film Festival on 5 April 2019. Olympia went on to screen at such festivals as RiverRun International Film Festival, Pan African Film Festival, Gig Harbor Film Festival and Bentonville Film Festival.

== Cast ==
- McKenzie Chinn as Olympia Welles
- Charles Andrew Gardner as Felix
- Ericka Ratcliff as Jemma
- LaNisa Renee Frederick as Grace
- Penelope Walker as Angie
- Sadieh Rifai as AJ
- Shane Kenyon as Damn the Man Dan
- Leah Karpel as Shane
- Stef Tovar as Scott
- Kelly O'Sullivan as Becca
- Charin Alvarez as Gabriella
- Larry Neumann Jr. as Jerry
- Andrew Goetten as Toph
- Joshua Rollins as Nathan
- Ben Fox as Hunter
- Cortney Mckenna as Nurse (as Courtney McKenna)
- Lee Palmer as Stan
- Nyimah Zavaleta as Young Olympia
- Timothy Farrell as Tony
- Emmy Neira as Jen
