= Olympia High School =

Olympia High School may refer to:

- Olympia High School (Orlando, Florida)
- Olympia High School (Stanford, Illinois)
- Greece Olympia High School (Rochester, New York)
- Olympia High School (Olympia, Washington)
- Olympian High School (Chula Vista, California)
