= Sharmanka Kinetic Gallery =

Coordinates: 55°51′26″N 4°14′48″W

The Sharmanka Kinetic Gallery is a theatre of kinetic sculpture, in Glasgow, Scotland. The museum features mechanical figures which perform shows.

It is a collaboration between sculptor-mechanic Eduard Bersudsky, theatre director Tatyana Jakovskaya, and light and sound designer Sergey Jakovsky. The word "sharmanka" (шарманка) is Russian for hurdy-gurdy or barrel-organ.

== History ==
Sharmanka was founded in Saint Petersburg in 1989 and based in Glasgow since 1996. It was exhibited at Eretz Israel Museum in Tel Aviv, Edinburgh Royal Museum, London Theatre Museum, Manchester City Art Gallery, McLellan Galleries, Glasgow, Museum Speelklok, Utrecht, as well as at science and technology museums in Granada, Jerusalem, Switzerland and Copenhagen, performed at Edinburgh Festival Fringe in 2008, London International Mime Festival in 2002 and 2009.

Commissions include The Millennium Clock for Royal Museum (in cooperation with Tim Stead and others) in Edinburgh, "The Flight" for Bloomfield Science Museum, Jerusalem, "St.Mungo-at-the-Tron" in Glasgow, "World of Artist" for Storm P. Museum, Copenhagen etc.

Sharmanka kinetic sculptures are in collections of Glasgow Museums, Museum of Nonconformist Art in Saint Petersburg, and Science Museum in Jerusalem Granada Science Park.
