= Olympia (1998 film) =

- Directed by: Bob Byington
- Written by: Howard Rodman
- Produced by: Adrienne Gruben
- Starring: Jason Andrews; Carmen Nogales
- Cinematography: Paul Kloss
- Edited by: Garret Savage
- Music by: Lisa Hunsacker
- Release date: 1998
- Running time: 76 minutes

Olympia is a 1998 film about a Mexican soap opera star who leaves her career behind to pursue her first love – javelin throwing. She comes to the United States and takes up with a coach who's never coached before.

Director Bob Byingtons' film opened for the SXSW film festival that year.

The movie won the Grand Jury prize for best drama at the Long Island Film Festival.

Lisa Hunsacker, who composed the music for the film, was also the costume designer.
