= Olympia-class cruiser =

Class of US Navy ships

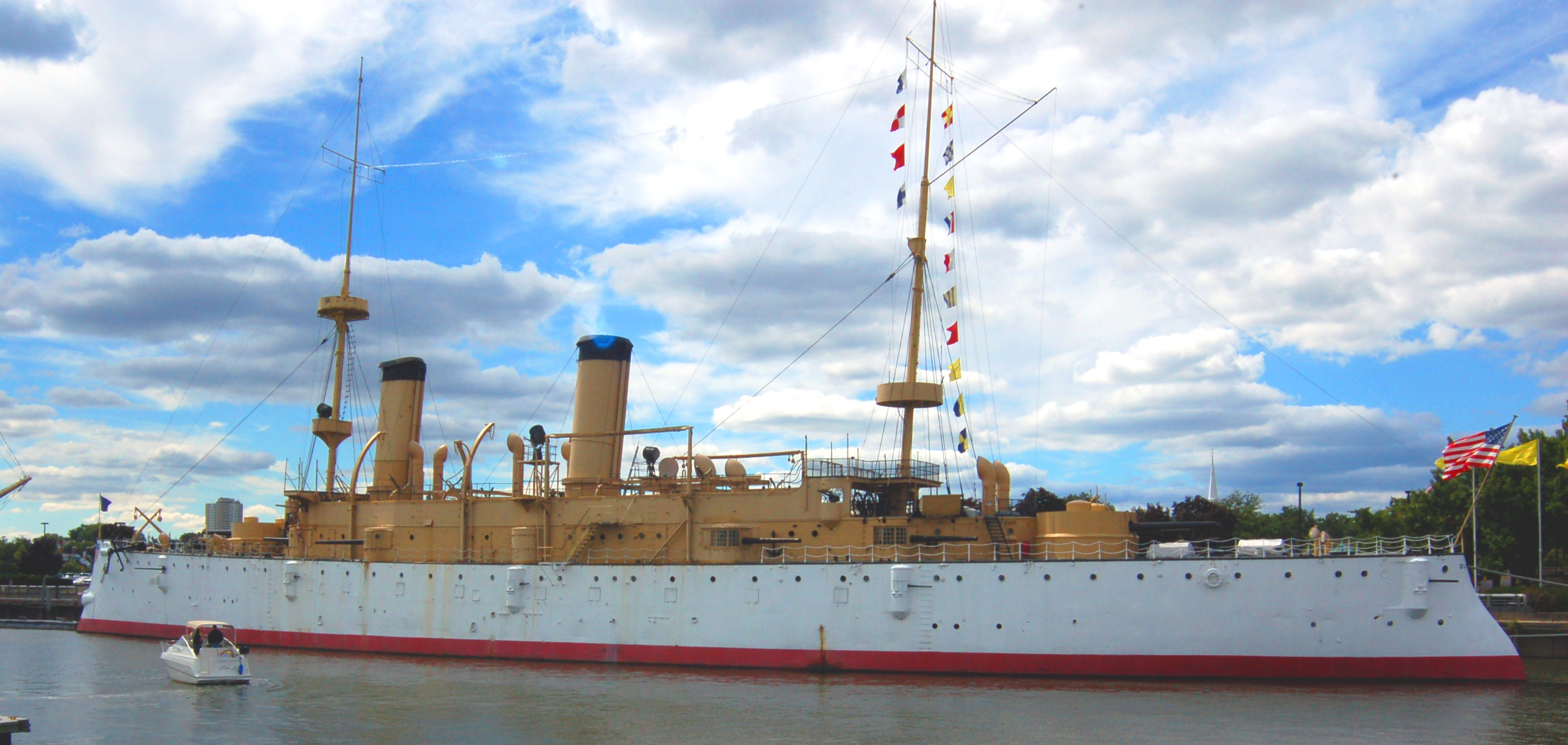
- USS Olympia (C-6)

Class overview
- Name: Olympia-class cruiser
- Operators: United States Navy
- Preceded by: Chicago-class cruiser
- Succeeded by: Columbia-class cruiser
- Completed: 1
- Retired: 1
- Preserved: 1

General characteristics
- Type: Protected Cruiser; (Heavy Cruiser)
- Displacement: 5,870 tons
- Length: 344 ft 8 in (105.05 m)
- Beam: 53 ft
- Draft: 21 ft 6 in
- Propulsion: Triple-expansion; 2 Screws; 18,000 Horsepower
- Speed: 22 knots
- Complement: 33 officers; 396 enlisted men; OR; 17 officers; 282 men
- Armament: 4 - 8-inch guns; 10 - 5-inch guns; 14 - 6 pounder guns; 4 - gatlings
- Armor: Turrets 3.5 in; Barbettes 4.5 in; Protective deck - flat 2 in; slope 4.75 in

The Olympia class was a class of protected cruiser operated by the United States Navy.

== History ==
The Olympia class was built in a transitional period for warship design and for the US Navy. The Navy was expanding its fleet to move beyond coastal defence onto the world stage. The Olympia was larger and faster than the previous generation of Navy ships, built with a new type of vertical triple expansion steam engine. Yet she retained a vestigial suit of sails for emergency propulsion. She was one of the first navy ships to have electricity, hydraulic powered steering gear and refrigeration. The Olympia class was also designed and constructed entirely inside the United States as per a stipulation by Congress. This was to force advances in United States industrial technology. This led to the rise of steel shipbuilding inside the United States.

The Olympia has the distinction of being the third oldest preserved United States Navy ship, after the USS Constitution and the USS Constellation and the only surviving ship of the Spanish–American War.

== List of ships ==
- USS Olympia (C-6)

== Bibliography ==
- Burr, Lawrence (2008). US Cruisers 1883–1904: The Birth of the Steel Navy. New York: Osprey Publishing. ISBN 978-1-84603-267-7. OCLC 437097869.
