= Olympia Leisure Centre (1974) =

Defunct swimming venue in Dundee, Scotland

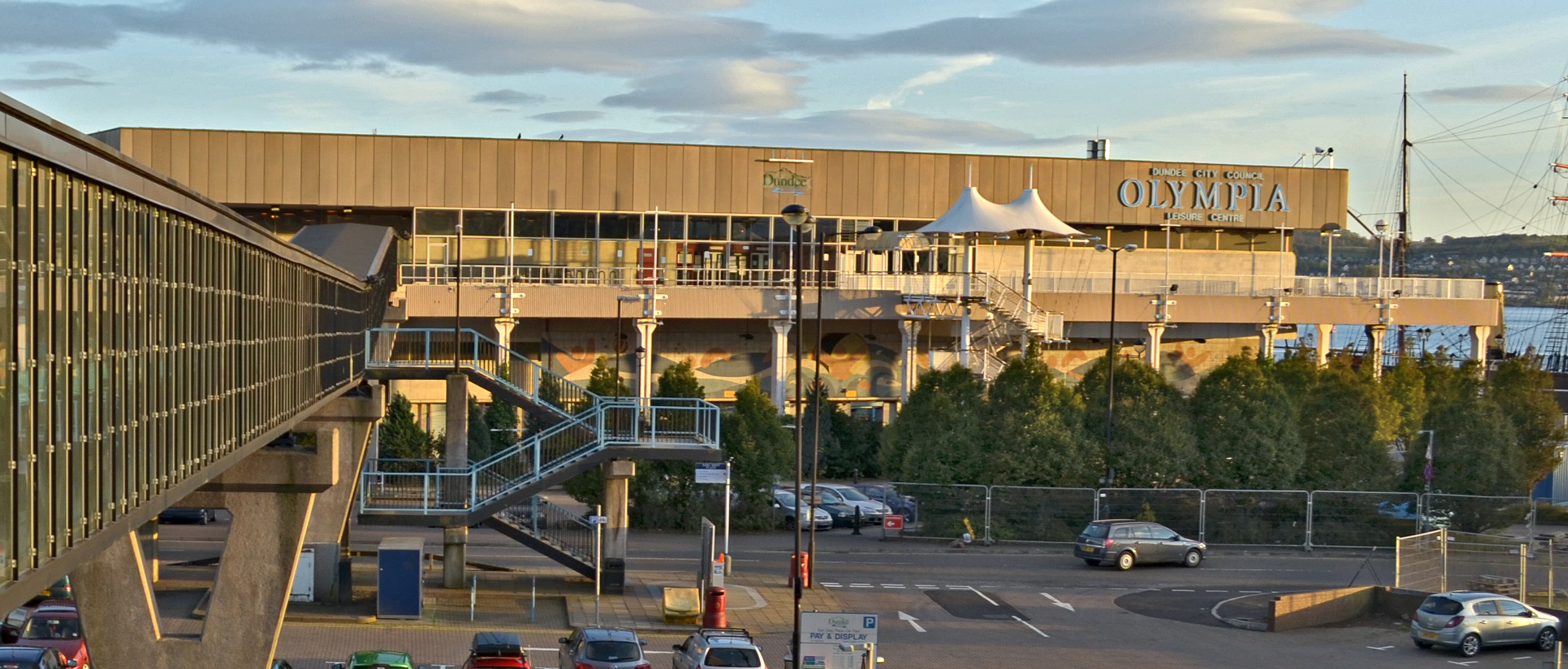
- Interactive map of Olympia Leisure Centre
- Former names: Dundee Leisure Centre
- Coordinates: 56°27′27.4″N 2°58′0.72″W
- Operator: Dundee City Council, later Dundee Leisure

Construction
- Opened: 15 July 1974
- Closed: July 2013

The Olympia Leisure Centre was a swimming pool in Dundee.

== History ==
The facility was built on an infilled dock.

The facility opened on 15 July 1974. The facility reopened on 28 August 1991 as the Olympia. Operation of the pool transferred from Dundee City Council to Dundee Leisure, a charitable trust, in 2006.

The facility closed in 2013, having been replaced with the new Olympia Leisure Centre, and was subsequently demolished. The V&A Dundee was built where the pool stood previously. In 2021, a mural was created by Cobalt Collective outside the V&A depicting the pool.

== Facilities ==
Water slides were added to the original pool in 1987.

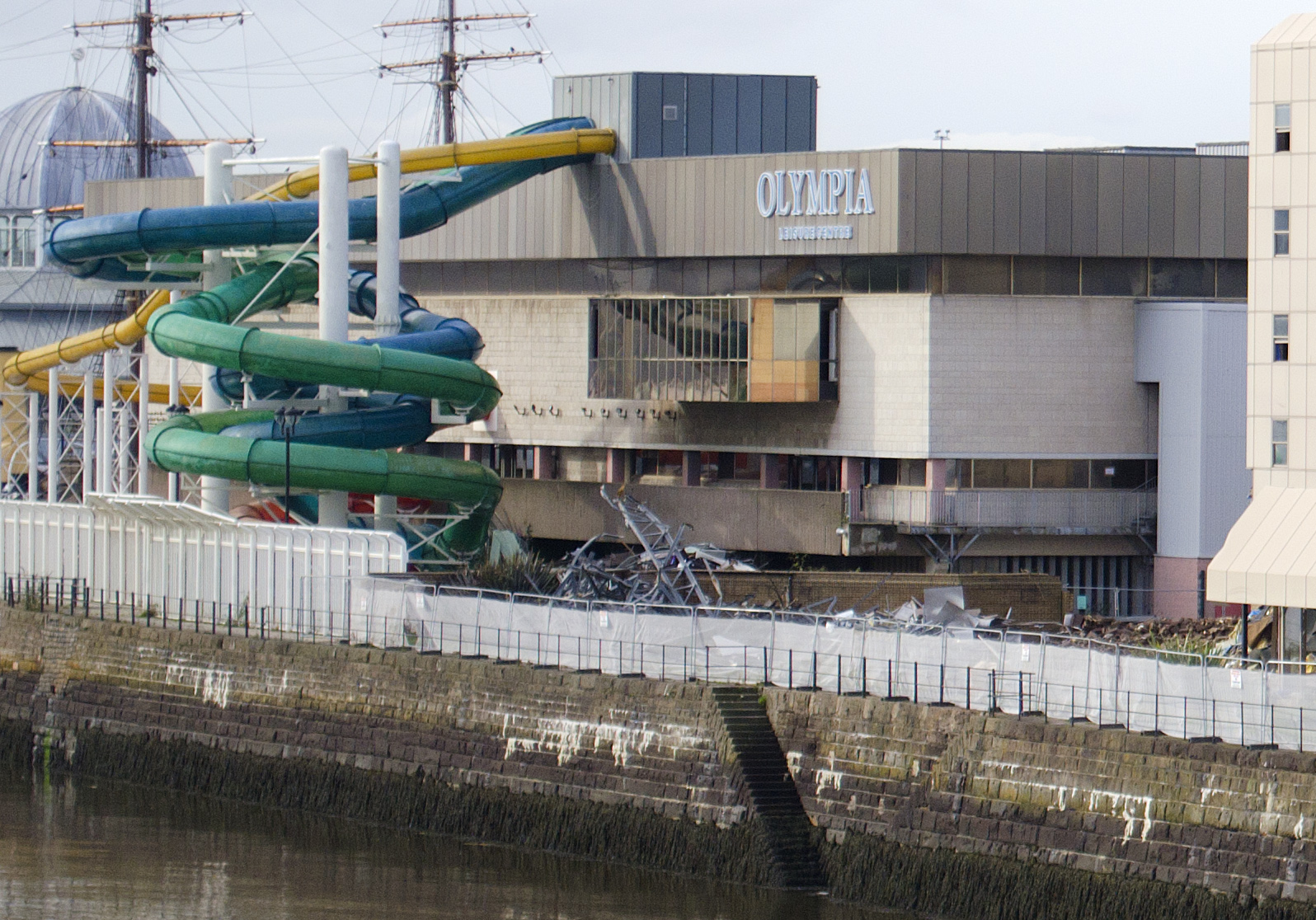
Rear of the pool shortly after closure. The blue, green and yellow slides were originally added in 1987.

Following the 1991 refurbishment, the Centre had four pools. The main pool area had a "beach" entrance where it gradually approached zero depth and also included wave machines, a rapid river, whirlpool, and a hot tub. There was also a diving pool, children's pool, and a 25-metre training pool.

== Incidents ==
On 29 September 2007 shortly before closing time, a seven-year-old boy who could not swim drowned in the wave pool after becoming separated from the two older children he was playing with. After being reported missing, his body was found half-an-hour later underneath the pool covers. An investigation by the Health and Safety Executive found that the boy drowned in a blind spot and that lifeguards had not received adequate training on identifying blind spots and ensuring the pool was fully supervised. The operators of the pool, Dundee Leisure, were fined £40,000 following the investigation. A temporary lifeguarding station was established until the wall that created the blind spot was knocked down.

During the demolition of the building in January 2014, the roof partially collapsed on top of an excavator. The operator escaped unharmed.
