= Olympia Leisure Centre (2013) =

Swimming venue in Dundee, Scotland

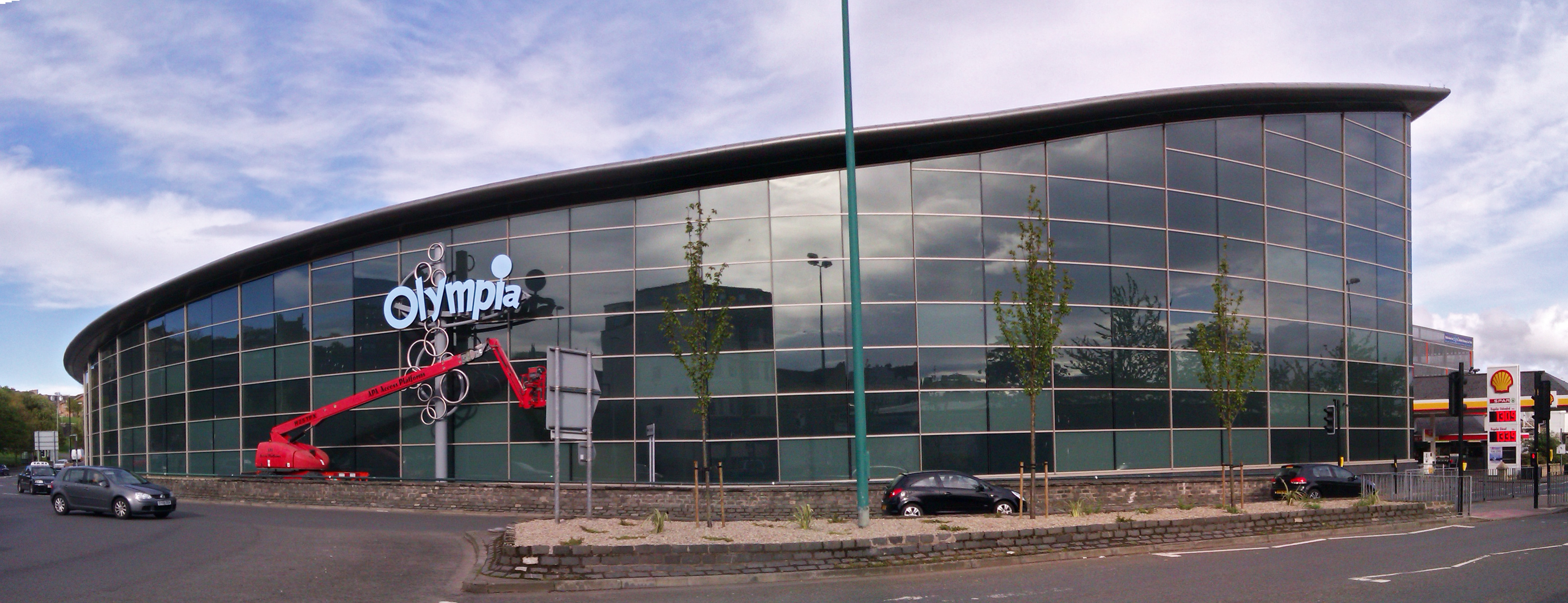
- Interactive map of Olympia Leisure Centre
- Coordinates: 56°27′50.21″N 2°57′47.65″W
- Operator: Leisure and Culture Dundee

Construction
- Opened: June 2013
- Closed: October 2021
- Reopened: 18 December 2023

The Olympia Leisure Centre is a swimming pool in Dundee, Scotland. It was closed for two years until it reopened on 18 December 2023.

== History ==
The building was constructed to replace the original Olympia Leisure Centre and is situated on a former car park. Construction began in January 2011 and was due to be completed in September 2012 with a budget of £31.5 million. The main contractor was Balfour Beatty.

The pool opened in June 2013. An official opening by Shona Robison was held in September 2013.

In September 2021, problems were identified with light fixings, resulting in the closure of the pool in October. Initially the operators stated it would remain closed at least until 18 December 2023. On 10 November the operators stated it would be closed until further notice. Further investigations following the closure found more structural issues. A £4.5 million repair program was launched which is expected to be completed by late 2022. Olympia was reopened on 18 December 2023 after a two year closure.

The flumes, leisure pool, and children's pool were closed in February 2024 after a metal rod fell. They are expected to reopen in May.

== Facilities ==
The Centre includes a 50 metre variable-depth pool, wave pool, rapids, and a fitness suite. There is also a cafe, and a multi-storey car park.
