= Médiamétrie =

French audience measurement company

- Type: S.A.
- Founded: June 1985
- Founder: Jacqueline Aglietta
- Headquarters: Levallois-Perret, France
- Area served: Market studies and surveys
- Products: Audience behaviour and market trends
- Net income: €102.7 in 2018
- Owner: Yannick Carriou
- Number of employees: 674
- Website: mediametrie.fr

Médiamétrie (French pronunciation: [medjametʁi]), established in 1985, is a public limited company specialising in audience measurement and research into audio-visual and digital media usage in France. It is especially well known for its Audimat brand whose name is now part of everyday language; today, however, that brand is named Médiamat.

== About ==
Médiamétrie came into being during the 1980s in response to the new needs of the audio-visual landscape in France which was undergoing rapid change at that time. In television, it was the launch of new channels: Canal+, La Cinq, TV6 and the privatisation of TF1. Furthermore, in radio, the first major private stations emerged with the privatisation of Europe 1 and the rise in popularity of NRJ. Médiamétrie was therefore created to provide scientific measurement of the audience of the main audio-visual (and later digital) media, and was recognised by all stakeholders and professionals (media, advertisers, and agencies). Since the 2000s, the company has expanded its activities to include the internet, digital hobbies and new media. Médiamétrie is also the company that provides the audiovisual watchdog agency ARCOM and the INA with accurate time slots for the programmes broadcast, as well as certification for the airing of advertisements.

== History ==
=== Television ===
In 1981, Audimat was launched in France by the Centre d’Étude d’Opinion (CEO), an opinion research company. It was based on a panel of 600 households equipped with audience meters. Measurement was carried out on a daily basis with results reported the following morning, however, no indication was given as to the profile of the audience watching the television set. In early 1988, Médiamétrie and other market stakeholders agreed to launch a benchmark measurement based on a larger panel and which took individual audiences into account. At that time, Audimat became Médiamat, which from then on was an individual television audience measurement rather than a household one. In 2008, the panel was expanded to its current size: 5,000 households, approximately 11,400 individuals aged four years and over. In 2011, recorded time-shifted viewing was incorporated into television audience measurement, followed by catch-up in 2014. Since 2016, Médiamétrie has measured television audiences on four screens: television, computer, smartphone and tablet.

=== Radio ===
1986 saw the creation of an audience measurement mechanism for the radio based on a telephone survey in mainland France. Back then, it was called the “55,000” in reference to the size of the sample interviewed in one year (excluding the summer). In the 1990s, the “55,000” became the “75,000 +”, before evolving into the “126,000” in 2005, as the sample size was expanded. For each year in radio between September and June, there are four waves of results covering 126,000 people. These individuals are asked about their listening habits in a landline or mobile telephone interview.

=== Internet ===
With the technological developments of the 2000s, Médiamétrie expanded its activities to include measurement of the internet audience in France. Thus in 1999, Médiamétrie initiated measurement of web traffic thanks to its “24,000 Multimedia” survey. In 2000, the company launched a joint-venture with Nielsen to produce an internet / computer measurement in France that was based on a panel of several thousand individuals. The emergence of mobile phones and later, tablets encouraged market stakeholders and Médiamétrie to launch an internet / mobile measurement in 2010, and that was then followed by the measurement of tablet audiences. Since the start of 2018, internet audience measurement has been “global”: it includes browsing on computer, smartphone and tablet.

== Visual identity ==
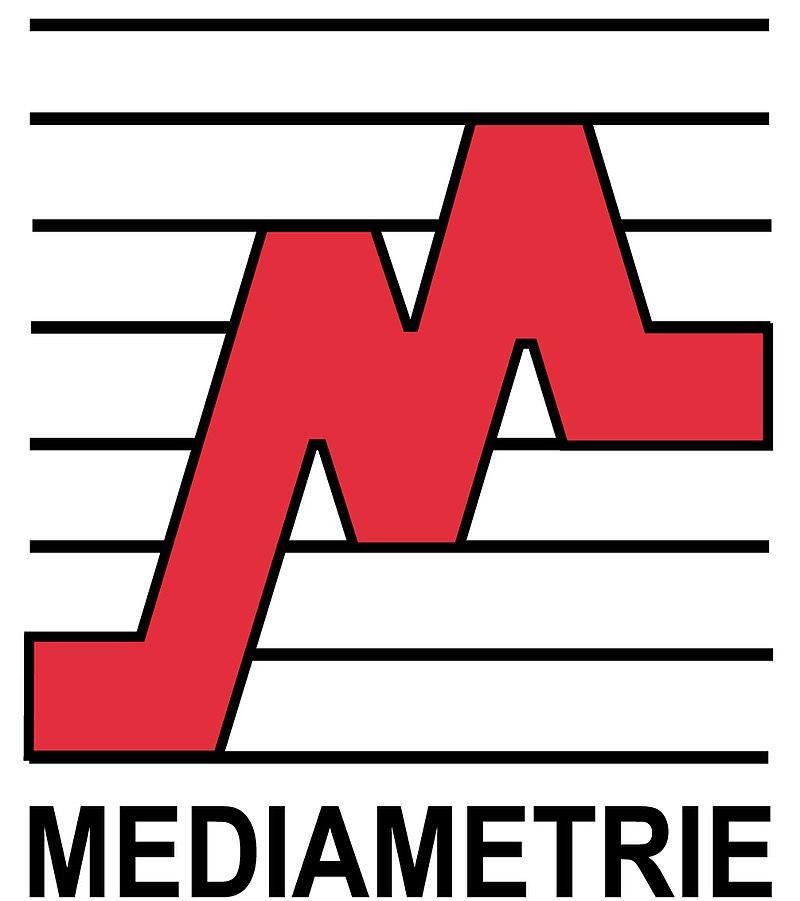
Logo 1999-2001

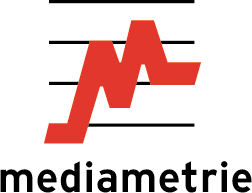
Logo 2001-2013

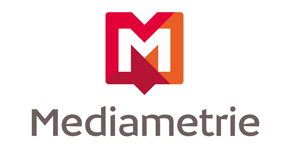
Logo since April 2013

== Company activities ==
=== Audience measurement ===
Médiamétrie conducts media audience measurement in France and covers radio, television, cinema and internet. Its studies are used by media and industry professionals to tailor their editorial content and to obtain data to use when calculating advertising rates.

=== Media behaviour studies and new practices among French consumers ===
Médiamétrie measures the audiences of the main media and it also conducts surveys into new behaviours and practices of French consumers. It also decodes trends in equipment, media consumption and emerging practices such as video on demand, smart speakers, podcasts, etc.

=== Thematic studies ===
Beyond audience measurement and studies into media behaviour, Médiamétrie also surveys the French population about their practices and opinions.

A few examples of non-media related surveys:

- “Illegal video use in France” with the Centre National du Cinéma (CNC) and the ALPA association against audio-visual piracy;
- “The French and management of their personal data” with the Institut des Mines-Télécom;
- “The French and Artificial Intelligence” with Paris-Dauphine University;
- “Citizenship and Civility on the Internet” with Renaissance Numérique.

=== International activities ===
Médiamétrie is present internationally in three business areas.

==== Exporting technology ====
In India, the BARC (Broadcast Audience Research Council) chose the audience meters developed by Médiamétrie as well as watermarking technology to use with its television audience measurement panel. With 33,000 Indian households now equipped, this also represents the largest TV panel in the world. In Norway, TNS Gallup Norway (Kantar Media Group) decided to equip 1,500 of its TV panellists with the RateOnAir mini-audience meter to include measurement of television programme viewing outside the home.

In May 2019, Médiamétrie and three foreign research institutes – BARC (India), Numeris (Canada) and Video Research (Japan) – formed an international alliance in order to collaborate on the future of video audience measurement.

==== Audience measurement in Africa ====
In Morocco, Médiamétrie operates automatic television audience measurement via its subsidiary Marocmétrie, with a similar activity to that carried out in France (representative household panel equipped with audience meters).

In Côte d'Ivoire, Senegal, Cameroon and Madagascar, Médiamétrie and its local partners conduct several “reporting-based” surveys annually to discover the TV, radio and internet practices of the inhabitants of these countries.

==== International programme monitoring and audience data from different countries ====
Glance, Médiamétrie's international television department compiles TV audience data from around the world thanks to its partnerships with Médiamétrie's counterparts abroad. Its data bank includes over 7,000 channels in more than 100 countries around the world. Glance monitors and detects new TV and online programmes around the world.

Since September 2016, Glance has worked closely with TAPE Consultancy, a British company specialising in TV content as well as production and programming consultancy.

== Methods and Operation ==
=== Television ===
==== Television audiences in France ====
===== A sample or "panel" =====
Composed of 5,000 households i.e. almost 11,400 individuals aged 4 years and older equipped with a television set, the sample is representative of the French population. It is constituted and recruited based on the following criteria: socio-demographics (gender, age, PCS from INSEE, France's National Institute of Statistics and Economic Studies); television and multimedia equipment used; television reception modes (broadband internet, cable, satellite, digital terrestrial television).

===== A technology =====
The technology uses a box (the audience meter) fitted to the televisions in sample households and also relies on a special remote control which enables each household member and their guests to be identified individually when they are watching a programme. Each individual on the panel must activate their button whilst watching television, and deactivate it when they stop watching. This system makes it possible to measure the audience on a second-by-second basis. The audience meter uses watermarking technology to identify the channel being watched, as well as the date and time of broadcast. This data is automatically transmitted daily to the Médiamétrie servers at 3 a.m. and 5 a.m. This data is then processed so that it can be extrapolated to the total French population, thus generating the audience results that are delivered every morning at 9 a.m. to measurement clients.

===== The conventions or "rules of the game" =====
Television audience measurement also relies on conventions that lay down the “rules of the game”: what does the measurement include? What size should the sample be? How should we communicate the results? ... These conventions are defined in consultation with the channels, advertisers, and advertising stakeholders at special TV media committee meetings held six times a year. Major decisions regarding the definition, orientation, management and evolution of TV audience measurement are debated at these committee meetings.

===== Time-shifted, catch-up and internet screens =====
Watermarking can be used to distinguish live viewing from time-shifted viewing of programmes: it detects the difference between the broadcast date and time information for the live programme and the time logged by the audience meter as the programme was actually being watched. In 2011, Médiamétrie incorporated time-shifted audiences watching programmes in pre-recorded and live pause modes into Médiamat, and in 2014, it added catch-up audiences (video on demand) for programmes on TV. Each day, 4.4 million French people watch television on internet screens, i.e. computer, smartphone and tablet (Source: Global TV – Oct.-Dec. 2017). In order to take these new practices into account, today, Médiamétrie measures TV audiences on the television set but also on smartphones, tablets, and computers. Derived from the reconciliation of TV and internet measurements, these audience numbers are available for all screens and all viewing times. Médiamétrie received the IAB Europe award for its 4-screen measurement in May 2017.

==== Channels included in the measurement ====
===== DTT channels =====
The 27 digital terrestrial television channels (DTT) which are free-to-air: TF1, France 2, France 3, Canal+, France 5, M6, Arte, C8, W9, TMC, TFX, NRJ 12, LCP - Assemblée Nationale / Public Sénat, France 4, BFM TV, CNews, CStar, Gulli, France Ô, TF1 Séries Films, L'Équipe, 6ter, RMC Story, RMC Découverte, Chérie 25, LCI and Franceinfo.

===== Channels received via cable, satellite, broadband internet or fibre optic =====
Médiamat'Thématik operates just like the Médiamat. This automatic audience measurement covers more than 120 channels and has a catchment population in excess of 46.2 million people aged 4 years and older.

=== Radio ===
==== 126,000 Radio Survey ====
Médiamétrie's 126,000 Radio survey measures the radio audience in France for all listening locations and modes (traditional radio, car radio, computer, mobile phone, etc.). 126,000 individuals aged 13 years and older who are representative of the population are surveyed over a year via computer-assisted telephone interviews. The 126,000 Radio survey is administered from Médiamétrie's survey sites based in Amiens and Petit-Quevilly. Results are published in four waves throughout the year: January/March, April/June, July/August and September/December. “Grilles Radio d’Été”, the July/August wave of summertime radio programming audience results features slightly different programming schedules. Local and regional radio audiences are researched in the Médialocales study.

==== Complementary surveys ====
Other panel-based surveys are also conducted which analyse different behavioural aspects of the French towards radio: their loyalty to particular stations is studied via the Radio Panel; the audiences of podcasts and all other audio content (audio books, music streaming, etc.) are studied via the Global Audio Study.

=== Internet ===
==== Audience measurement of websites and apps on all screens ====
Médiamétrie measures internet usage and audiences through various studies, including the Total Internet Audience study which analyses the audiences of over 6,000 websites and 700 apps. This automated study is carried out via software installed on computer equipment. It records the browsing history of 30,000 individual panellists aged 2 years and older. The data collected is then extrapolated to the total population of internet users living in France. This measurement includes audiences for all connection locations and screens (computer, tablet, mobile phone).

==== Complementary studies ====
Other surveys decode the media and multimedia practices (video streaming, audio streaming, podcasts, etc.) of the French population, in particular on mobile screens (mobile phones and tablets) and via smart speakers. Médiamétrie also measures SVoD practices (subscription video on demand) to determine the consumer habits of French people, as well as the most viewed programmes. Since 2013, Médiamétrie has also measured the effectiveness of online advertising campaigns among market professionals.

== Governance ==
=== Board of directors ===
The Board of Directors of Médiamétrie, chaired by Yannick Carriou, defines the strategy and the general stability of the company. It is made up of 12 stakeholders: Radio France, Métropole Télévision, NextRadioTV, Union des marques, France Télévisions, TF1, Société d’édition de Canal+, Promotions & spectacles d’Europe 1, Dentsu Aegis Network France, Publicis Conseil, Havas et DDB Holding Europe.

=== Decision-making committees ===
Six committees define, guide and validate the measurements and studies conducted by Médiamétrie: Audimétrie (audience measurement), TV Thématiques (special interest TV), Internet, Radio and Métridomet Data. Scientific and technical commissions plus working groups and an internet assembly complement the work of these committees.

=== Capital ===
Médiamétrie's capital amounts to €14,880,000 and is held by market professionals: Media, advertisers, agencies. Médiamétrie's independence is thus guaranteed since none of the latter groups holds a majority.

== Reviews ==
Médiamétrie was the subject of strong criticism during 2006. The audience measurement institution was challenged by two of its directors, Patrice Duhamel and Philippe Santini, who accused the company of opacity and inertia in the face changing technology and new modes of consuming media (broadband internet, DTT, mobile, podcasts). In particular, the audience measurement methods and the reliability of the audience results provided by Médiamétrie for DTT channel audiences were called into question.

In 2009, the novelist Marc Welinski published a thriller entitled: “Indices”, whose plot was based on the internal Médiamétrie manipulation of the audience ratings for a major television channel, TVF.

In 2012, the journalist Eric Leser of slate.fr published a heavily critical article evoking issues such as: conflicts of interest, easily manipulated measurements, back room plots, promotional games and even the lack of competition.

In 2017, Didier Maïsto, President of the Fiducial Media Group and the owner of Sud Radio, announced his intention to file a complaint against Médiamétrie. He called into question the company’s survey methods which he claimed could indicate erroneous figures and he accused it of “being the judge in its own case.

In 2018, the Court of Appeal of Versailles rejected Sud Radio's request concerning a court-appointed expert investigation into the Radio audience measurement methodology.
