= Radio Monte Carlo =

Radio stations

Radio Monte Carlo (RMC) is the name of radio stations owned and managed by several different entities:

== Stations ==
Radio Monte Carlo is considered one of the most popular networks especially in non-European Italian and French-speaking regions for its assumed neutrality. During the Iraq War, it was mentioned by some journalists as a reliable source. Radio Monte Carlo was founded by the Nazis in March 1942, ceased transmission in June 1944 and was back on the air with American help as a joint venture with the Principality of Monaco in August 1944. In 1998, the French government sold its share to a private holding group made up of Sud Radio and la Depeche du Midi.

=== French language ===
- RMC (France) is a French-speaking station, broadcasting in France and Monaco owned by RMC BFM.
  - RMC Sport, a French bouquet of paid TV sport channels, launched on 7 June 2016 as SFR Sport and rebranded as RMC Sport on 3 July 2018:
    - RMC Sport 1, flagship channel
    - RMC Sport Access, multisports
    - RMC Sport Live 2-4, additional channels to broadcast live matches
  - RMC Découverte, RMC Life and RMC Story, three digital free-to-air TV channels focused on talk-shows and documentaries

=== Italian language ===
- Radio Monte Carlo is an Italian-speaking station, broadcasting in Italy and Monaco from both Monaco and Milan, and owned by Mediaset. Radio Monte Carlo was founded in 1966 by Noel Cutisson and its enlisted deejays included: Antonio Devia, Awanagana, Ettore Andenna, Gigi Salvadori, Herbert Pagani, Liliana Dell'Acqua, Luisella Berrino, Manuela De Vito, Marco Odino, Mario Raffaele Conti, Max Pagani, Riccardo Heinen, Roberto Arnaldi, Valeria Porrà, and others. Nowadays deejays are: Paolo Remondini, Alberto Capozzella, Luisella Berrino, Maurizio Di Maggio, Massimo Valli, Max Venegoni, Patrizia Farchetto, Marco Porticelli, "Jackie", Nick "The Nightfly", David Dunn, Kay Rush, "Katamashi", Stefano Bragatto, Monica Sala, Clive Malcolm Griffiths, Mauro Pellegrino and Erina Martelli.
  - Radio Monte Carlo 2 (MC2) is the second Italian-speaking station, formerly associated with RMC Radio Monte Carlo Network broadcasting in Italy and Monaco.

=== Russian language ===
- Radio Monte Carlo (Russia) is broadcast on the following FM frequencies: from Moscow (102.1), Saint Petersburg (105.9), Rostov-on-Don (103.7), Kaliningrad (100.9), Vyborg (99.8), Syzran (92.9), Balakovo (96.6) and Nakhodka (106.7). This is the Russian-speaking radio station which broadcasts modern, new age, and semi classic music along with news and other broadcasts. Between 2008 and 2010 it was broadcasting contemporary lounge and house music and remixes. It is owned by the state company Russian Media Group, the same company behind the Russkoye Radio network.

=== Other languages ===
- Radio Monte Carlo Doualiya is an Arabic-speaking station, broadcasting throughout the Middle East and North Africa.
- Radio Monte Carlo (Uruguay) is a Spanish-speaking station broadcast on 930AM in Montevideo, Uruguay.
- Radio Monte Carlo (Paraguay)
- Radio Monte Carlo (Chile)
- Radio Monte Carlo (Georgia)

=== Former ===
- Radio Monte Carlo Swiss was a German-speaking station broadcasting from Zürich, Switzerland. It ceased in 2014 following bankruptcy of Music First Network AG.
- Radio Monte Carlo International was an English language station on 205 metres on the mediumwave. Launched on December 1, 1970 with British DJs Tommy Vance and Dave Cash with contemporary pop music and considered at the time as a rival of Radio Luxembourg's English programming.

== Broadcasts in other languages ==
Radio Monte Carlo's transmission network includes some high power long wave and medium wave transmitters located at Roumoules in France. For many years the MW unit has been hired out at nighttime to the Middle East Reformed Fellowship through Trans World Radio, with programming in various languages including Arabic and English. In 1970, RMC's transmitters were also used by the short lived British commercial album station Radio Geronimo.

== The World Tomorrow broadcast ==
During the late 1950s The World Tomorrow radio broadcast of Herbert W. Armstrong was carried by Radio Monte Carlo in the English, Spanish and Russian languages. Armstrong claimed that while the Voice of America was jammed by the Soviet Union, his Russian-language broadcast was heard loud and clear in Moscow. The medium wave transmitter of RMC carries mostly Trans World Radio programming during evening hours.

== Transmitters ==
- Transmitter Roumoules
- Col de La Madonne
- Fontbonne
