= Gold Prix de la TNT =

French television awards

Gold Prix de la TNT (en) Gold TNT Award
- Awarded for: Excellence in French television
- Country: France
- Presented by: Télé Star; Europe 1; RTL; Public; Closer
- First award: 2015
- Website: www.goldprixdelatnt.fr

The Gold Prix de la TNT (English: Gold TNT Award), nicknamed as Les Gold, is a French accolade bestowed in a ceremony by various telecom organizations partenant with Télé Star in recognition of excellence in programs and professionals of French and Francophone television. The format and scope were inspired by the Emmy Awards.

The ceremony was preconceived to be the successor of the 7 d'Or (now discontinued) and become one of greatest in French television. The César Award for cinema, the Victoires de la Musique for music and the Molière Award for theater, can be considered as equivalent.

== Organization ==
The five nomination categories are voted by a jury of journalists and news editors of television, representing all French media: Europe 1, RTL, Public, Closer and Télé Star. The list of nominees is communicated May 11, at midnight. The official list of nominations for TNT's Gold Award is then posted on the site of the ceremony.

The first round of voting determines, in each category, emissions, Animators and columnists who received enough votes to enter the second round. The nominations are among 5 categories. The closing of the first round takes place five days before the press conference announces appointments. The second round determines, in each category, or the ones who, having obtained the highest number of votes will be awarded. The announcement of the winners takes place at the ceremony, June 9, in the presence of all named and many personalities of French television.

The closing of the second round takes place in online voting two days before the ceremony. The counting of votes in the second round is controlled and enclosed by the bailiff in his study, from 16h on the day of the ceremony. It then prepares secure envelopes containing the names of the winners of the 12 categories, and then affix his seal them. From that moment, he constantly keeps the 12 envelopes with him. He finally makes it to the place of the ceremony at 20h, and settled behind the scenes. The bailiff then hands personally and personally to each of remitters, as and extent of the advertisement trophies, the sealed envelope, which will then be opened on stage, live, by delivering and its contents revealed to the public.

=== Chamber and jury ===
- Eric Pavon, Editor of Télé Star and Télé Poche
- Gianni Lorenzon, Chief Editor of Public
- Leslie Benaroch, journalist at Public Gaelle
- Placek, Assistant Editor of VSD
- Roman Ambro Europe 1
- Thomas Joubert, Europe 1
- Angevert Luc, Deputy Chief Editor of Closer
- Vatant Kevin, Chief Editor of JeanMarcMorandini.fr
- Nabet Ruth, Journalist

=== Eligible television channels ===
- D8
- W9
- TMC
- NT1
- NRJ 12
- France4
- D17
- gulli
- France Ô
- 6ter
- RMC Story
- Chérie 25

== Categories ==
The Gold Prix de la TNT is awarded in the following categories:

- Outstanding show of Coaching
- Outstanding show of Talent
- Outstanding emission Surveys
- Outstanding show of Televised Game
- Outstanding show Magazine/Documentary
- Outstanding Host/Moderator
- Outstanding Columnist
- Outstanding show of Reality TV
- Outstanding show of Entertainment
- Outstanding Novelty
- Gold of Honor

== Ceremonies ==
Ceremony	Date	Host(s)	Venue	Broadcast Partner(s)
1st TNT's Gold Awards	Juin 09, 2015	Laurie Cholewa	Bobino Theatre	None

== Equivalents ==
United States

- Emmy Awards

France

- César Award (cinema)
- Victoires de la Musique (music)
- Molière Award (theatre)

== See also ==
- Golden Globe Awards
- BAFTA Television Awards
- Screen Actors Guild Awards
- Writers Guild of America Awards
- Critics’ Choice Television Awards
- Directors Guild of America Awards
- Producers Guild of America Awards
- Television Critics Association Awards
