= Antennes Locales =

French television network

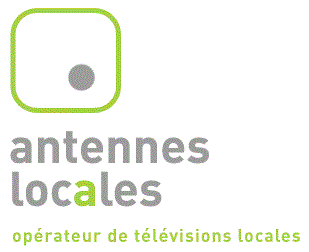
- Type: Free-to-air television network
- Country: France
- Availability: Defunct
- Owner: Groupe Hersant Média
- Launch date: July 2002; 22 years ago
- Dissolved: 29 January 2011; 14 years ago
- Language: French

Antennes Locales (later Cap Télé Groupe) was a French television network established in 2002 and closed in 2011. It aimed to become the country's first private national network by aggregating local stations, either pre-existing or created for the country's then-new digital terrestrial television service (DTT). It eventually succumbed to a combination of low revenue and undercapitalization at parent company Groupe Hersant Média.

== History ==
=== Origins ===
Antennes Locales was launched in July 2002 by Jacques Rosselin, co-founder of Courrier International and Emmanuel de Moutis, president of Wunderman-Cato-Johnson France. As with Courrier International, Pierre Bergé and Yves Saint-Laurent's investment fund Berlys Développement was an early backer. The company's aim was to position itself early on in the local TV market, which was primed for a massive overhaul in the following years. Historically, local TV had been a low value segment of the French television market, often merely subsidized by municipalities for the purpose of boosting the local public cable company's channel count. But the advent of DTT, which by law would guarantee slots to so-called "chaînes de proximité", seemingly held the potential of greater visibility – and viability – for those channels.

Groupe France Antilles was a major newspaper publisher although, as one of the entities resulting from the 1986 antitrust split of media mogul Robert Hersant's empire, its portfolio of titles was viewed as unbalanced. France Antilles had owned a stake in Canal 32, a local channel based in Troyes, since its inception in 2001. The market was a stronghold of the group as it owned both the city's liberal and conservative dailies. Philippe Hersant, son of Robert and principal of Groupe France Antilles, saw a strategic opportunity to re-expand his side of the empire through television.

=== Takeover and growth ===
In March 2004, Groupe France Antilles acquired 34 percent of Antennes Locales. By November 2007, the now renamed Groupe Hersant Média had brought its stake to 100 percent. In early 2008, the Antennes Locales moniker was discontinued as Hersant Média' TV division was reorganized as "Cap Télé Groupe" under newly appointed director general Eric Hersant, Philippe's nephew.

At its peak, the network had seven channels, often co-owned with local investors such as regional branches of the Crédit Agricole and Caisse d'Epargne banks:

- Cap 24 (Greater Paris)
- Canal 32 (Troyes, Aube)
- CityZen TV (Caen-Hérouville, Calvados)
- Orléans TV
- TéléGrenoble
- TéléAlsace
- TéléMiroir (Nîmes, Gard)

In addition, Hersant Média held interests in channels that were not officially part of Antennes Locales/Cap Télé Groupe like TV8 Mont-Blanc, Antilles Télévision (through the France-Antilles newspaper) and La Chaîne Marseillaise (despite its failed bid for the Marseille DTT license, GHM still became involved with the eventual channel through its 2008 acquisition of La Provence, which had a stake in the winning project). Through his Editions Suisses publishing group, Philippe Hersant also held a participation in the Swiss channels Léman Bleu and TVM3, respectively based in the Geneva and Lausanne agglomerations.

To support the young network, Hersant Média partnered with France Télévisions and NRJ Group to start Uni TV, an advertising sales agency tailored for local televisions.

=== Contraction and closure ===
While it was the largest operator of local channels in the country, Hersant Média never managed to secure a truly dominant position nationwide. The network experienced a substantial setback when its TéléAlsace cable channel, a rare wholly owned entity, lost on the new DTT licence in the Strasbourg-Mulhouse market to rival Alsatic TV, which was led by a strong coalition of regional players including Les Dernières Nouvelles d'Alsace, L'Alsace, RC Strasbourg and SIG Basket. This forced the premature shutdown of TéléAlsace after less than two years of existence.

Another market that eluded the group was Lyon where Le Progrès, ironically a former Robert Hersant publication, secured the DTT licence for its Télé Lyon Métropole channel at the expense of Philippe Hersant's project. Other markets the company targeted without success included Perpignan, Montpellier and Le Mans.

In addition, the group never followed through on channels for which it had won licenses in the Champagne-Ardennes, Nice-Cannes and Toulon-Hyères markets.

Ultimately, despite occasionally relying on recognized personalities to promote the venture, Hersant Média was not able to make it a money-making proposition. Harmstrung by a loss of advertising revenue incurred by the 2008 financial crisis and the Great Recession and free Internet competition for its paid classified magazines, the group ceded its portfolio of local channels to separate regional investors. The last remaining Antennes Locales channel, Canal 32, was sold to its management in March 2011. The group lost more than 40 million Euros on the failed network.

== See also ==
- BFM Régions, a successor network
- Vià, a successor network
