= J'irai dormir chez vous =

French travel documentary series

- Created by: Antoine de Maximy
- Presented by: Antoine de Maximy
- Country of origin: France
- No. of seasons: 14
- No. of episodes: 69

Production
- Running time: 52 minutes
- Production companies: Bonne Pioche; RMC Découverte

Original release
- Network: France 5 RMC Découverte
- Release: July 1, 2005 – present

J'irai dormir chez vous (meaning "I'll come sleep at your house") is a French travel documentary series aired on French TV channels Canal+, France 5 and Voyage. It is hosted by Antoine de Maximy. Each episode features self-recorded videos from the solo trip of Antoine in a country. His aim is to meet the locals in the streets, and ultimately try to dine and stay the night at their house, to discover the local trends and way of life.

== Episodes ==
| Broadcasting date | Country or region | Filming order | Episode order in season | Channel | Audiences | References |
Season 1
| 1 July 2005 | Japan | 5 | 1 | Canal+ | N/A | |
| 8 July 2005 | Morocco | 7 | 2 | Canal+ | N/A | |
| 15 July 2005 | Mali | 1 | 3 | Canal+ | N/A | |
| 22 July 2005 | Quebec | 2 | 4 | Canal+ | N/A | |
| 29 July 2005 | Vanuatu | 3 | 5 | Canal+ | N/A | |
| 5 August 2005 | India | 8 | 6 | Canal+ | N/A | |
| 12 August 2005 | Switzerland | 10 | 7 | Canal+ | N/A | |
| 19 August 2005 | Chile | 9 | 8 | Canal+ | N/A | |
| 26 August 2005 | Australia | 6 | 9 | Canal+ | N/A | |
| 2 September 2005 | France | 4 | 10 | Canal+ | N/A | |
| 29 June 2006 | China | 14 | 11 | France 5 | N/A | |
| 6 July 2006 | Ethiopia | 16 | 12 | France 5 | N/A | |
| 3 August 2006 | Cambodia | 13 | 13 | France 5 | N/A | |
| 24 August 2006 | United Arab Emirates | 17 | 14 | France 5 | N/A | |
| 2 December 2006 | Romania | 15 | 15 | France 5 | N/A | |
| 9 December 2006 | Belgium | 12 | 16 | France 5 | N/A | |
| 16 December 2006 | Southern France | 11 | 17 | France 5 | N/A | |
| 23 December 2006 | Madagascar | 19 | 18 | France 5 | N/A | |
| 30 December 2006 | Bolivia then Peru | 20 | 19 | France 5 | N/A | |
| 6 January 2007 | United Kingdom | 18 | 20 | France 5 | N/A | |
Season 2
| 9 September 2007 | Israel | 21 | 1 | France 5 | N/A | |
| 16 September 2007 | French Polynesia | 23 | 2 | France 5 | N/A | |
| 23 September 2007 | Portugal | 24 | 3 | France 5 | N/A | |
| 30 September 2007 | Finland | 22 | 4 | France 5 | N/A | |
Season 3
| 25 April 2009 | Cuba | 25 | 1 | France 5 | N/A | |
| 9 May 2009 | New Zealand | 29 | 2 | France 5 | N/A | |
| 16 May 2009 | Indonesia | 30 | 3 | France 5 | N/A | |
| 23 May 2009 | Iran | 27 | 4 | France 5 | N/A | |
| 30 May 2009 | Greece | 26 | 5 | France 5 | N/A | |
| 20 June 2009 | Mexico | 28 | 6 | France 5 | N/A | |
Season 4
| 1 October 2011 | South Korea | 33 | 1 | France 5 | N/A | |
| 8 October 2011 | Ghana | 32 | 2 | France 5 | N/A | |
| 15 October 2011 | Mongolia | 35 | 3 | France 5 | N/A | |
| 22 October 2011 | Hawaii | 31 | 4 | France 5 | N/A | |
| 29 October 2011 | Albania | 34 | 5 | France 5 | N/A | |
Season 5
| 23 December 2013 | California | 36 | 1 | France 5 | N/A | |
| 11 October 2014 | Namibia | 40 | 2 | France 5 | N/A | |
| 18 October 2014 | Argentina | 38 | 3 | France 5 | N/A | |
| 25 October 2014 | Germany | 37 | 4 | France 5 | N/A | |
| 1 November 2014 | Myanmar | 39 | 5 | France 5 | N/A | |
| 8 November 2014 | Cape Verde | 42 | 6 | France 5 | N/A | |
| 15 November 2014 | Spain | 41 | 7 | France 5 | N/A | |
Season 6
| 2 July 2015 | (Republic of Ireland) Ireland | 43 | 1 | France 5 | N/A | |
| 9 July 2015 | Uruguay | 44 | 2 | France 5 | N/A | |
| 16 July 2015 | Saint Lucia and Barbados | 45 | 3 | France 5 | N/A | |
| 12 September 2015 | Italy | 46 | 4 | France 5 | N/A | |
| 19 September 2015 | Kyrgyzstan | 47 | 5 | France 5 | N/A | |
Season 7
| 14 July 2016 | Bhutan | 48 | 1 | France 5 | 938 000 | |
| 14 July 2016 | Croatia | 49 | 2 | France 5 | 938 000 | |
| 21 July 2016 | Colombia | 50 | 3 | France 5 | 791 000 | |
| 21 July 2016 | Malta | 51 | 4 | France 5 | 791 000 | |
| 27 August 2016 | Malawi | 52 | 5 | France 5 | N/A | |
Season 8
| 15 June 2017 | Nicaragua | 53 | 1 | France 5 | 900 000 | |
| 22 June 2017 | Bosnia and Herzegovina | 54 | 2 | France 5 | 826 000 | |
| 29 June 2017 | Thailand | 55 | 3 | France 5 | 1 236 000 | |
| 6 July 2017 | Tanzania | 56 | 4 | France 5 | 1 107 000 | |
| 13 July 2017 | Netherlands | 57 | 5 | France 5 | 785 000 | |
Season 9
| 5 July 2018 | Armenia | 58 | 1 | France 5 | 1 080 000 | |
| 5 July 2018 | Philippines | 59 | 2 | France 5 | 1 150 000 | |
| 12 July 2018 | Kiribati | 60 | 3 | France 5 | 821 000 | |
Season 10
| 20 June 2019 | Cyprus | 61 | 1 | France 5 | 841 000 | |
Season 11
| 8 October 2021 | Costa Rica | 62 | 1 | RMC Découverte | 499 000 | |
Season 12
| 17 June 2022 | Ivory Coast | 63 | 1 | RMC Découverte | 480 000 | |
| 28 October 2022 | Kazakhstan | 64 | 2 | RMC Découverte | 449 000 | |
Season 13
| 21 April 2023 | Serbia | 65 | 1 | RMC Découverte | 623 000 | |
| 28 April 2023 | Vietnam | 66 | 2 | RMC Découverte | 521 000 | |
| 3 November 2023 | Paraguay | 67 | 3 | RMC Découverte | 479 000 | |
Season 14
| 8 March 2024 | Algeria | 68 | 1 | RMC Découverte | 609 000 | |
| 10 May 2024 | Taiwan | 69 | 2 | RMC Découverte | 442 000 | |
| 29 November 2024 | Estonia, Latvia and Lithuania | 70 | 3 | RMC Découverte | 339 000 | |
Season 15
| 28 February 2025 | Georgia | 71 | 1 | RMC Découverte | 393 000 | |
| 20 June 2025 | Oman | 72 | 2 | RMC Découverte | 246 000 | |
| 5 September 2025 | El Salvador | 73 | 3 | RMC Découverte | 262 000 | |
Season 16
| 27 March 2026 | Alaska | 74 | 1 | RMC Découverte | N/A | |
| 29 May 2026 | Mauritius | 75 | 2 | RMC Découverte | N/A | |

== Special episodes ==
| Name | Date | Country or region | Channel | Audiences | References |
|---|---|---|---|---|---|
| J’irai dormir chez l’homme qui brûle (Burning Man) | 3 January 2014 | United States | France 5 | 1 274 000 | |
J'irai dormir chez les Gaulois
| Episode 1 | 10 November 2023 | Occitania | RMC Découverte | 586 000 | |
| Episode 2 | 6 December 2024 | Auvergne-Rhône-Alpes, Occitania and Nouvelle-Aquitaine | RMC Découverte | 462 000 | |
| Episode 3 | 28 November 2025 | Brittany, Picardy and Auvergne-Rhône-Alpes | RMC Découverte | 323 000 | |

== Feature film ==
| Name | Date | Country or region | References |
|---|---|---|---|
| J’irai dormir à Hollywood | 19 November 2008 | United States | |
| J’irai dormir à Bollywood | 18 December 2011 | India | |
