= Canal 32 =

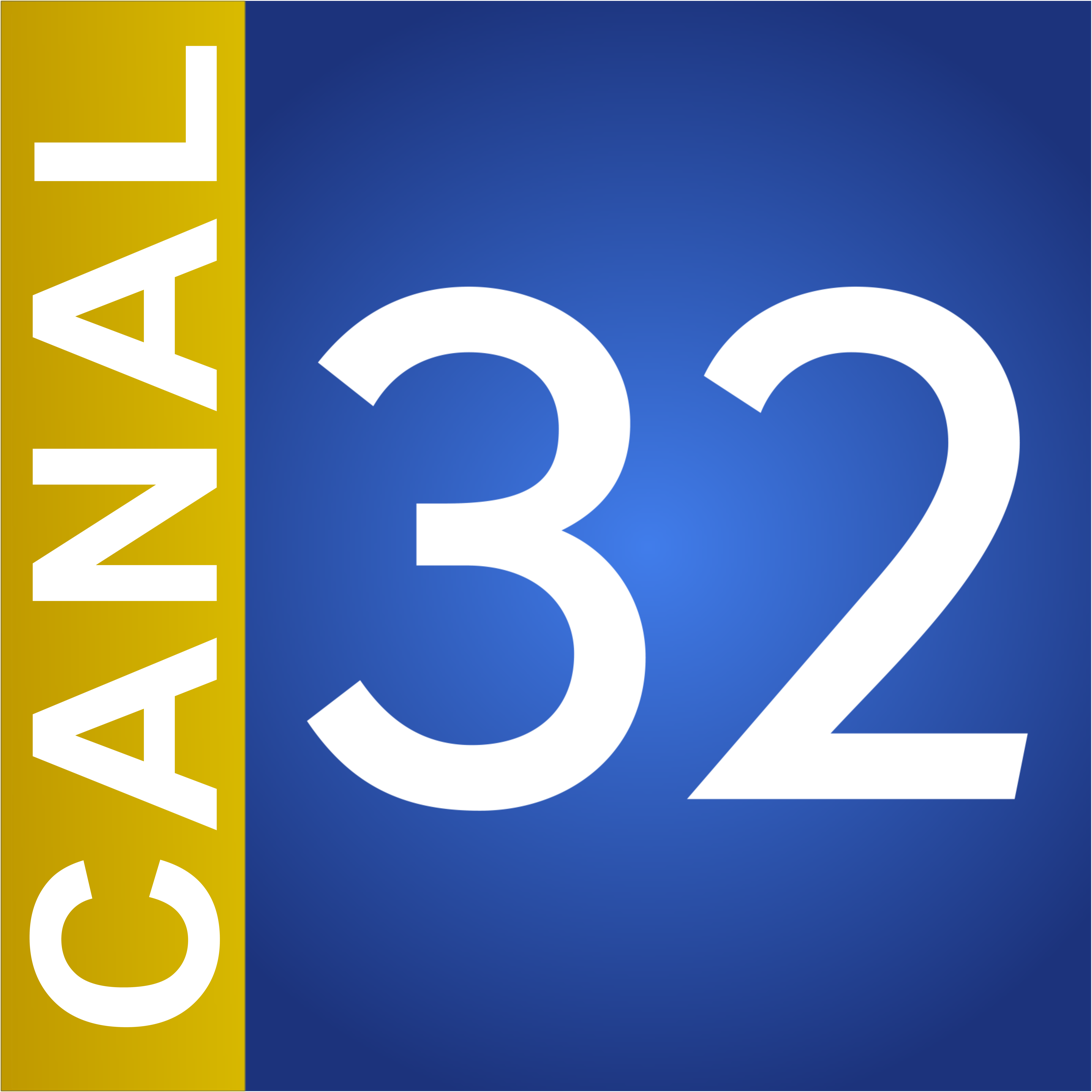
- Country: France

Programming
- Picture format: 576i (16:9 SDTV)

Ownership
- Owner: Antennes Locales (Groupe Hersant Média)

History
- Launched: 23 November 2001

Availability

Terrestrial
- TNT: Channel 32

Canal 32 is a private French generalist television channel from Troyes and the department of Aube visible locally on DTT and everywhere in France for the box owners. It was launched on November 23, 2001 at the initiative of a former journalist, Claude Patin, to publish various cultural, sports and miscellaneous information of the Trojan agglomeration (Claude Patin with Jacques Ségui create this local and departmental channel).

== Programs ==
The program schedule of Canal 32 is composed of magazines and information about the city of Troyes and the department of Aube as well as local events.

It broadcasts a live magazine segment from Monday to Friday between 7:00 pm and 8:00 pm, interspersed with the news at 6:30 pm. The latter is also multi-broadcast at 7:30 pm and 8:30 pm and 9:30 pm. The programs are broadcast several times a week and especially on weekends. The channel proposes a loop of programs with a variable duration between 3 and 4 hours. Nevertheless, this loop can be broken during particular events taking place in the Trojan agglomeration.

Canal 32 participated in the two syndications for the series. It aired season 1 of 24 and the series MASH and The Practice. Every other Wednesday, it also broadcasts Game'In TV, a program about video games.

== Broadcasting ==
Canal 32 is broadcast in Troyes and its agglomeration as well as in the south of the Aube department. Since April 2, 2011, Canal 32 has ceased its analog broadcasting, its hertzian broadcasting area did not cover the entire department of Aube because of the presence of other transmitters located in the west of the department.

=== Visual Identity (Logo) ===
Logo used from 23 November 2001 - 2005

Logo used from 2005 - 2009

Logo used from 2009 - January 2021

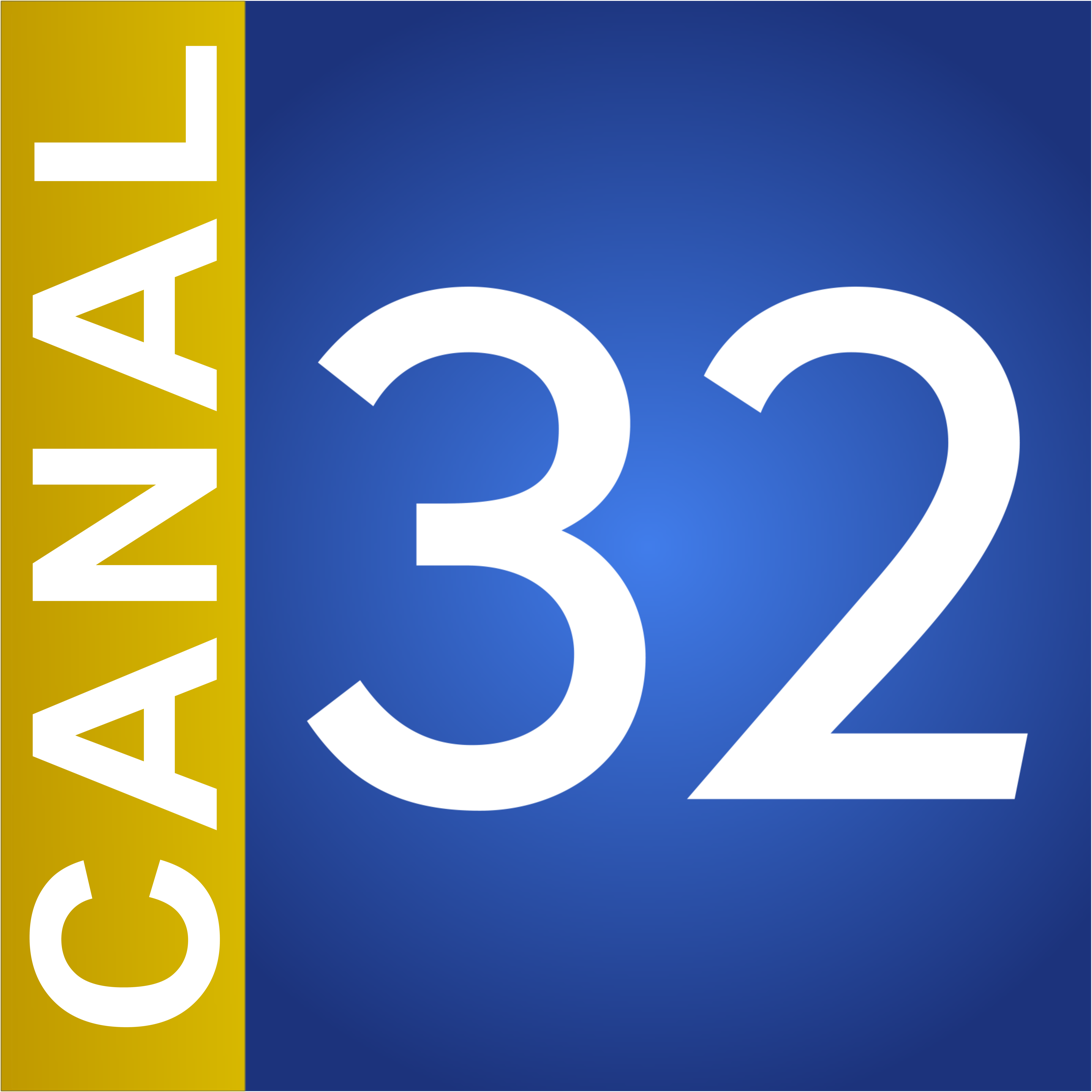
Logo used since January 2021
