= BFM Business =

French business radio and TV station

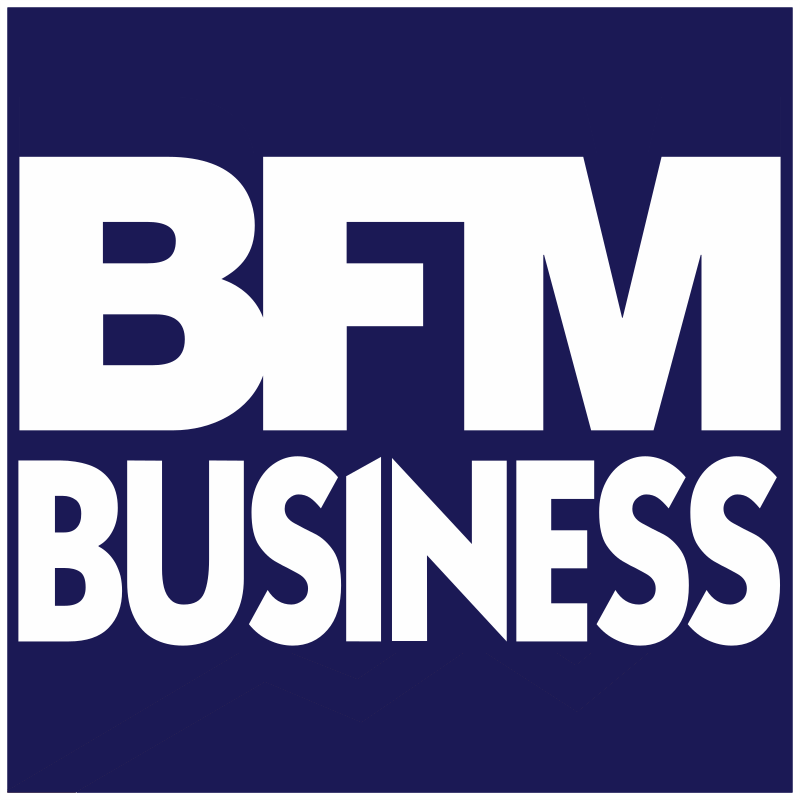
- Logo used from 2023 to 2026
- Country: France

Programming
- Language: French
- Picture format: 16:9 (576i, SDTV)

Ownership
- Owner: RMC BFM
- Parent: CMA CGM
- Sister channels: BFM TV; BFM2; BFM Locales; RMC Découverte; RMC Story; RMC Life; Tech & Co

History
- Launched: 1991

Links
- Website: www.bfmbusiness.com

BFM Business (called BFM for Business FM until April 2009 and BFM Radio until November 2010) is France's first business news channel. It is also the most-listened to business news radio station in this country. From November 2010, BFM Business is a national economic television station offering regional variation in Ile-de-France. That regional variation was shut down in November 2016 and replaced by a local news channel, BFM Paris.

Founded in 1991 (radio), it has been part of RMC BFM group since 2024.

== Organization ==
=== Management ===
The chief executive officer is Guillaume Dubois and the assistant CEO is Nicolas Lespaule.

=== Capital ===
BFM Business is held by the French group RMC BFM which also owns the national news channel BFM TV and RMC radio station.

== Broadcasting ==
From November 2010 to November 2016, the television station was broadcast in 16:9 format on TNT in the Paris region (channel 24). It is still available by satellite in Western Europe and North Africa via Eutelsat 5 West A, available through Fransat, BiS TV and TV Orange-labeled or not.

By land line in France, the channel is available via ADSL, SD streams, Internet and IPTV, through most operators. It is also distributed by a number of cable networks.

The website offers live streaming and a variety of podcasts (also available on the iTunes Store). BFM is also available on most internet radios and via streaming.

== Presenters ==
- Guillaume Sommerer
- Cédric Decoeur
- Grégoire Favet
- Sébastien Couasnon
- Hedwige Chevrillon
- Fabrice Lundy
- Stéphane Soumier
- and others.

== Slogan ==
- December 2002 – November 2010: "La radio de l'économie" (The radio of economy)
- November 2010 – September 2014: "Numéro un sur l'économie" (Number one for economy)
- Since September 2014: "La France a tout pour réussir" (France has everything to succeed)

== See also ==
- List of radio stations in France
- List of television stations in France
