= Patrick Sabatier =

French radio and television presenter

- Born: 12 November 1951 (age 74); Paris, France
- Occupations: Television presenter Radio presenter
- Employer(s): RTL Radio (1976-1993); TF1 (1976-1992); La Cinq (1987); Monte Carlo TMC (1995-2003); France Bleu (2005-2007); Cap 24 (2008); France 2 (2009-2016); C8 (2018-)
- Spouse: Isabelle Laburthe
- Children: Margaux; Thomas

Patrick Sabatier (born 12 November 1951 in Paris, France) is a French presenter for both radio and television. He hosted the game show Mot de Passe (French counterpart of the American, Million Dollar Password) between 2009 and 2016.

== Early career ==
Born is Paris, Sabatier began his radio and television career as a presenter on the morning show for RTL Radio he continued to host the show until 1993. In addition Sabatier also worked as a television presenter for TF1, hosting the show Les visiteurs du mercredi.

== Success ==
Between 1978 and 1980 Sabatier hosted the afternoon show Atout Cœur, he rose to fame in 1980 when he hosted the shows Porte-bonheur, Avis de recherche and Le Jeu de la vérité. He commented on the Eurovision Song Contest twice in 1980 and 1981 for TF1 viewers and commented the Contest on radio twice in 1989 and 1990. In 1985 Patrick Sabatier had a look-alike puppet created of him for the show Les Guignols de l'info. In 1987 Sabatier went to work for the broadcaster La Cinq and began to host shows such as Il était une fois où, but continued to host shows for TF1. By 1990 two of his shows were cut off air.

== Controversies ==
Back in 1992, Sabatier was kicked off television and both Sabatier and his wife were charged with fraud after Sabatier made allegations on air saying he knew a cure for AIDS and Cancer on the show Si on se disait tout ?. Sabatier and his wife were acquitted of fraud in 1995. On September 14, 1993, Sabatier was given a four-year suspended sentence and fined 250,000 francs for tax evasion.

== Return to television ==
Sabatier returned to television in 1995 and began hosting various television programmes for Monte Carlo TMC, he continued to work for TMC until 2003. Between 2005 and 2007 he hosted the radio show Tous Ensemble on France Bleu. In 2008 he started hosting shows on Cap 24. From 2009 to 2016 he has been working for France 2 and has been hosting the show Mot de Passe.
