= Antoine de Maximy =

French backpacker, television host and producer

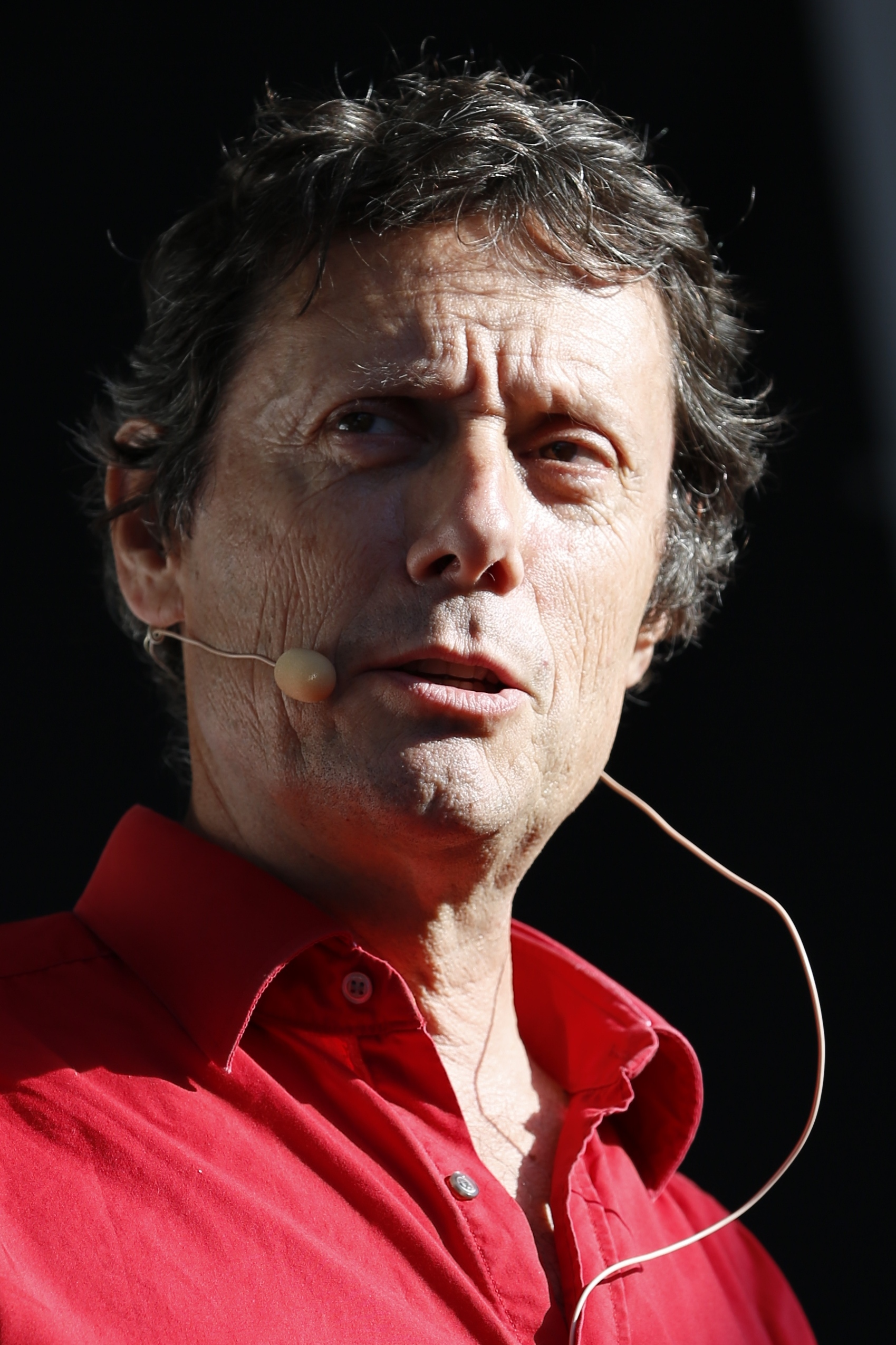
Antoine de Maximy in 2013

Antoine de Maximy (born May 21, 1959) is a French backpacker, television host and producer. He is best known as the TV host and producer of J'irai dormir chez vous (I'll come sleep at your house), a tourism TV show on France 5.

Antoine de Maximy is the eldest of four children. He grew up in a family of artists. His parents struggled to sell their paintings and therefore experienced financial difficulties. The family lived primarily on family allowances.

He was married to Sandrine Gallo, with whom he had a daughter, Lucie, born in 1994. Since 2022, he lives with his partner Magali Benet, an event professional.
