= TPS Star =

- Country: France
- Broadcast area: France
- Network: TPS
- Headquarters: Issy-les-Moulineaux, France

Programming
- Picture format: 576i (16:9 SDTV)

Ownership
- Owner: Télévision Par Satellite (2001-2008); Canal+ Group (2008-2012)

History
- Launched: 19 September 2001; 24 years ago
- Closed: 4 May 2012; 13 years ago

Links
- Website: http://www.tpsstar.fr

Availability

Terrestrial
- TNT: Channel 30

TPS Star was a French general entertainment channel broadcasting movies, sports and sitcoms.

== History ==
It started broadcasting in 2001 as the flagship general channel of TPS satellite platform, competing with Canal+ of the CanalSat platform. It started broadcasting in the TNT digital terrestrial television platform on 3 November 2005 as a pay channel with certain slots broadcast free-to-air. After the merger between TPS and CanalSat in 2007, it also became available on CanalSat.

The channel shut down on 4 May 2012.
