= L'Équipe (TV channel) =

French sports television channel

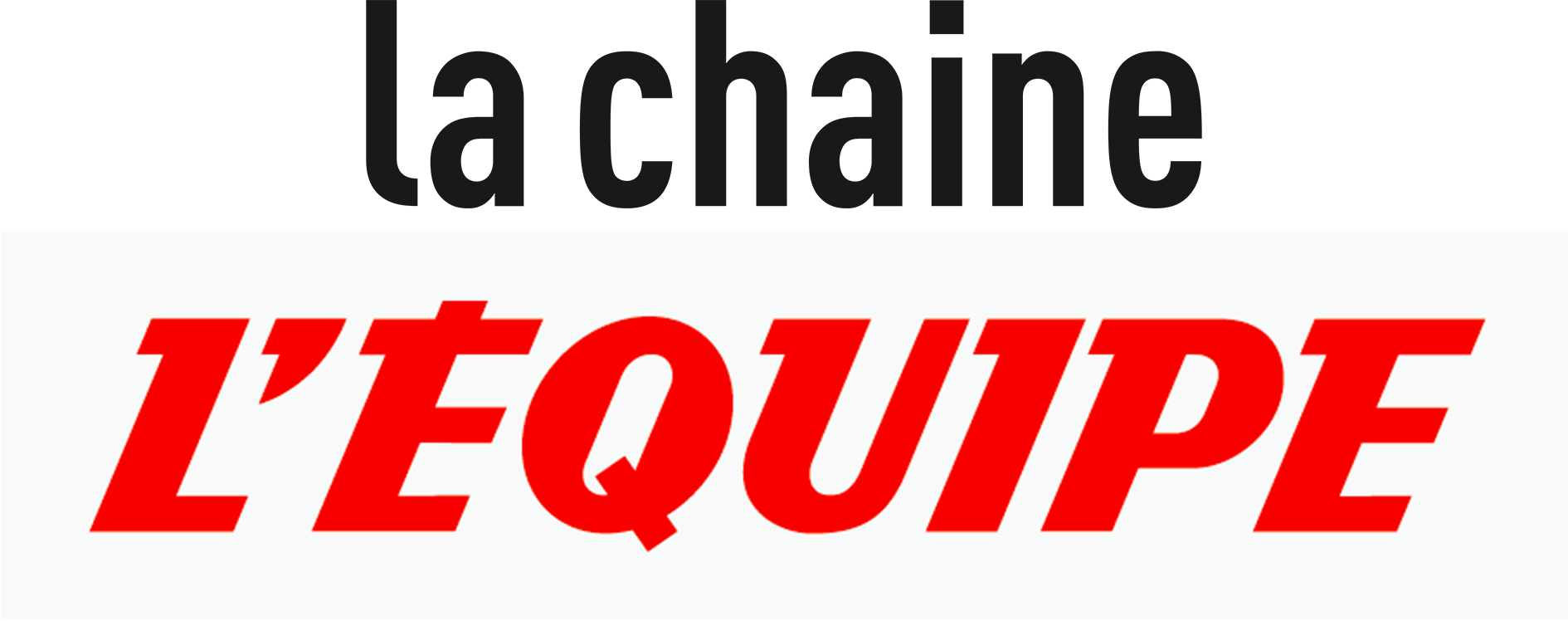
- Country: France
- Headquarters: Boulogne-Billancourt

Programming
- Picture format: 576i (16:9 SDTV); 1080i (HDTV)

Ownership
- Owner: Amaury Group

History
- Launched: 31 August 1998; 28 years ago
- Founder: Jean Hornain
- Former names: L'Équipe TV (1998–2012); L'Équipe 21 (2012–2016)

Links
- Website: lequipe.fr/tv

Availability

Terrestrial
- TNT: Channel 21

L'Équipe, often called La Chaîne L'Équipe (English: L'Équipe Channel) to distinguish it from its newspaper namesake, is a French sports television channel. It launched as a basic subscription channel in 1998, under the name L'Équipe TV. In late 2012, L'Équipe TV became L'Équipe 21 and started broadcasting in high definition on France's free digital terrestrial television (DTT). It was rebranded again to L'Équipe in September 2016.

L'Equipe 21 logo from 2012 to 2016.

== History ==
On 31 August 1998, Groupe Amaury launched a television channel spun off from its daily sports newspaper L'Équipe. It served as Canalsatellite's sports news channel, and competed with TPS' Infosport.

On 5 March 2012, Groupe Amaury answered an invitation to tender for one of six new high definition DTT channel slots extended by the French television regulatory authority, the CSA. Amaury's proposal to bring its existing L'Equipe TV to the platform, with an increased focus on live events, was backed by the French National Olympic and Sports Committee and the country's horse racing industry against the other bidder, NextRadioTV's RMC Sport HD.

On 27 March 2012, the CSA announced that L'Équipe HD (the channel's tentative new name) had been selected for one of the six new slots.

On 25 July 2012, the CSA awarded Channel 21 on the French DTT network, known as TNT (Télévision Numérique Terrestre), to Amaury. To better convey its position on the channel list, L'Équipe HD was renamed L'Équipe 21 on 14 November 2012.

The channel's TNT relaunch took place on 12 December 2012. On 3 September 2016, L'Équipe 21 was rebranded again to its present name: L'Équipe.

The channel shares its premises in Boulogne-Billancourt with its sister publication, and some of the newspaper's columnists have acted as on-air pundits.

== See also ==
- Sport en France, France's other free-access sports channel
