= T18 (TV channel) =

French television channel

- Country: France
- Broadcast area: France

Programming
- Language: French
- Picture format: 1080i (HDTV)

Ownership
- Owner: CMI France

History
- Launched: 6 June 2025; 12 months ago

Links
- Website: t18.fr

Availability

Terrestrial
- TNT: Channel 18

T18, also referred to by its project names Réels TV and CMI TV, is a French free-to-air television channel, that began broadcasting on 6 June 2025 on channel 18 at 19:45 CET.

This channel is owned by the Czech Media Invest (CMI) group, the main shareholder of which is Daniel Křetínský, who notably controls famous French press magazines, including the weeklies Elle, Télé 7 jours, Marianne, Public, France Dimanche, Ici Paris, Franc-Tireur and Version Femina as well as a stake in the Le Monde Group. The Loopsider media, also owned by CMI, must participate in the launch of the channel.

== History ==
In July 2024, Arcom decided not to renew the digital terrestrial television frequencies of C8 and NRJ 12 and to grant one of these two frequencies to Réels TV. The other was attributed to OFTV, a project presented by the SIPA Ouest-France press group.

On 23 September 2024, Christopher Baldelli was appointed president of the channel.

On 12 December 2024, Arcom formalized the allocation of a frequency, the name of the channel became CMI TV. On 20 December 2024, Réels TV announced that TF1 PUB would take care of its advertising management.

On 13 January 2025, during the renumbering of the TNT channels, Arcom allocated channel no. 18, until then occupied by Gulli, by a draw with the OFTV channel, which inherits channel 19.

On 15 January 2025, the chairman of the supervisory board of CMI France, Denis Olivennes, announced that the definitive name of the channel would be “T18”.
