= Roumoules radio transmitter =

Transmitter for Radio Monte Carlo, in southeastern France

Coordinates: 43°47′39″N 6°09′05″E

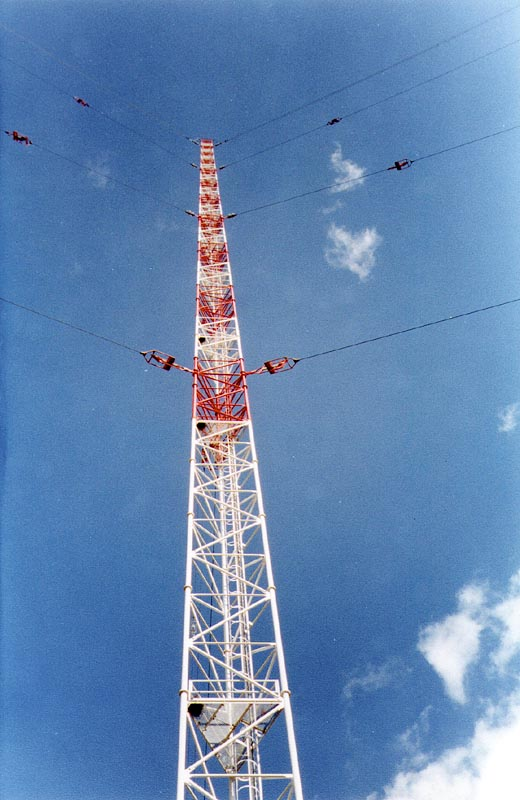

The Roumoules transmitter is the main broadcasting facility for longwave and mediumwave broadcasting of Radio Monte Carlo near Roumoules, France and is owned by Monaco Media Diffusion. The 1000 and 2000kW transmitters installed are among the most powerful in the world and can be received well at nighttime throughout Europe.

== Longwave transmitter ==
The longwave transmitter at Roumoules, which was inaugurated in 1974, transmits at 216 kHz (until 1988: 218 kHz) with a transmission power of 1400 kW (until 1976: 2000 kW). It consists of two 1000 kW transmitters switched in parallel, which are however run with 700 kW output power. A third 1000 kW unit has been available since 1983. Although this unit is only used as backup unit, it is possible to switch all three units in parallel, which would allow an operation with a transmission power of 3000 kW. Since 31 March 2020 the transmitter has ceased transmitting the French programme of Radio Monte Carlo but remains available for contract use.

The longwave transmitter uses a directional aerial with a maximum strength pointing northwest (azimuth: 309°). It consists of three 300-metre (980 ft)-high guyed masts, which are insulated against ground and ground-fed. As a backup a 330-metre (1,080 ft)-high guyed, ground-fed lattice steel mast radiator is available on the site, which only allows an omnidirectional radiation pattern.

The grounding system of the long wave transmitter is very large. The total length of all wires of the grounding system is 200 kilometres (100 mi), covering an area of 150 hectares (370 acres). Because the area around the mast is used for agriculture, the ground wires are laid to a depth of 80 centimetres (31 in).

== Medium wave transmitter ==
In 1987 a switchable directional antenna consisting of five ground-fed guyed masts was built nearby for the 1467 kHz medium wave frequency, which was previously transmitted from a transmitter at La Madonne. This antenna allows a switchable directional radiation in the following directions:

| Destination | Azimuth |
|---|---|
| Scandinavia | 25° |
| Eastern Europe | 85° |
| Italy and Greece | 150° |
| Spain, Portugal, Northern Africa | 241° |
| UK | 325° |

Changing the signal direction takes only 5 seconds. There are no matching network buildings at the bottom of the masts used for medium wave transmission – the devices for tuning the masts to the transmission line are placed in the open air, similar to those in the longwave antenna system.

The medium wave Roumoules transmitter has an output power of 1000 kW. It is also used for transmitting the religious programmes of Trans World Radio. In comparison to the longwave transmitter, which can be received well both at day and night in Southern France, Northern Italy, Switzerland and Southern Germany, this transmitter cannot be normally received well more than 100 kilometres (60 mi) from Roumoules. However at night its transmissions may have at least the same range as those of the longwave system due to its skywave propagation.

== Power supply ==
The Roumoules Transmitter consumes significant amounts of power, supplied by two transformers each capable of providing 5000 kW. The power is delivered to the transformers by a 150 kV and a 220 kV power line. The transmitter's power supply is larger than required (an equivalent supply would provide a community of 5000 with its own substation to the 150 kV grid supply). This redundant supply ensures reliable power for the transmitter. There is a backup generating set of 2,500 kW on the site and a possibility to supply the station at reduced power from the local 20 kV grid.

== See also ==
- List of masts
