= Novo 19 =

French TV channel

- Logo used since 2025
- Country: France
- Broadcast area: France

Programming
- Language: French
- Picture format: 1080i (HDTV)

Ownership
- Owner: Ouest-France

History
- Launched: 1 September 2025; 6 months ago
- Replaced: Culturebox (channel space)

Links
- Website: novo19.ouest-france.fr

Availability

Terrestrial
- TNT: Channel 19

Novo 19 (stylised as NOVO19), also referred to by its project names OFTV and Ouest-France TV, is a French free-to-air generalist national television channel that started broadcasting on 1 September 2025.

Owned by the group Ouest-France/Association pour le soutien des principes de la démocratie humaniste (ASPDH), a non-profit organization, the future channel aims to defend media and information independence, democracy, and to address issues affecting rural areas.

Unlike other generalist TV channels on French digital terrestrial television, it will be based in Rennes and not in Paris in a deliberate move away from the capital to develop the channel.

== History ==
=== Background ===
After the suspension of C8 and NRJ 12 by the Regulatory Authority for Audiovisual and Digital Communication (ARCOM) in July 2024, the project presented by Ouest-France was selected by the organization to be included on DTTV.

The channel, owned by the Association for the Support of the Principles of Humanist Democracy (ASPDH), aims to defend democracy, freedom of information and the press, and to focus particularly on issues affecting rural areas. It also aims to target "young adults aged 25 to 49 who live outside city centers".

=== Start of broadcast and future shows ===
When Novo 19 started broadcasting on 1 September 2025, the channel plans to hire at least 58 people in addition to the 700 journalists of the newspaper and undertake significant modifications to the newspaper's headquarters to prepare for the new channel.

The future media outlet will offer "live broadcasts, magazines, documentaries, news, entertainment, fiction, cinema, and sports". It plans to launch the program Marins et terriens, nos héros du quotidien, dedicated to biographies, the show La vie en vraie, focusing on themes related to issues affecting the French, and the show Manon Bril sonne les cloches, hosted by historian Manon Bril, to "revitalize history and heritage".

== Organisation ==
=== Head office ===
It plans to be based in Rennes, the historical headquarters of the Ouest-France newspaper, unlike other digital terrestrial channels, which are generally based in Paris.

On 2 October 2024, Guénaëlle Troly was appointed general manager of the channel.

=== Broadcasting ===
The launch must be made by 1 September 2025.

=== Budget ===
The budget is planned at 10 million euros by 2028.

== Editorial line ==
According to the director of Ouest-France, the channel will present "how the French live and will take a view both entertaining and grounded in reality".
