= Vià =

French television network

- Type: Free-to-air television network
- Country: France
- Launch date: 4 July 2018; 7 years ago (ViàRéseau); 25 June 2010; 15 years ago (Médias du Sud)
- Former names: TVSud
- Official website: viaoccitanie.tv
- Language: French

Vià (stylised as vià) is a French television network. It started as a southern regional network in 2010, before going national in 2018, and subsequently contracting again due to economic problems.

== History ==
=== Origins ===
When its national network Antennes Locales did not take off, Paris-based Groupe Hersant Média sold off its television stations to various regional investors. In 2009 TéléMiroir, based in the southern city of Nîmes, was sold to Christophe Musset and his associate Pierre-Paul Castelli, who had previously partnered with GHM in free print publications.

In 2010, Musset founded an umbrella company called Médias du Sud (French for 'Southern Media'), and acquired more stations in the southern cities of Montpellier, Perpignan, and Marseille (the latter went off the air in 2016). Consequently, Musset's stations adopted the common branding TVSud (French for 'TVSouth'), followed by the name of their specific submarket.

Musset also served as president of Télévision Locales de France, a trade association of French local televisions, between 2013 and 2017.

=== Expansion ===
In 2016 Musset proposed a new channel, tentatively named TVSud Toulouse and serving the eponymous regional capital. To gain access to his largest market yet, he secured an investment in Médias du Sud from fr:Bruno Ledoux, leading shareholder in print magazine Le Nouvel Économiste and local TV channel Télif (short for Télévision Ile-de-France). Shortly before the Toulouse launch in September 2017, the TVSud channels were rebranded as ViàOccitanie (after the southern region of Occitanie where all four are based). Ledoux's Télif was similarly rebranded as ViàGrand Paris.

Médias du Sud further expanded in May 2018 through the acquisition of Antilles Télévision (ATV), an embattled regional network consisting of three stations based in the French overseas departments of Guadeloupe, Guyane and Martinique. The channels were to be managed in cooperation with martiniquais businessman Xavier Magin. In an effort to cut down costs, the financially crippled Guadeloupe and Guyane channels switched to simulcasting the Martinique broadcast, but they remained nominally separate entities, with a possible return to original programming at a later date. The ATV channels would transition to the Vià branding in October 2018.

=== National network ===
Ledoux and Musset's next step was the creation of ViàRéseau, a network that would aggregate their own channels with independent stations under the Vià brand to form a true national footprint, allowing for the mutualization of certain production efforts and advertising sales. The business plan was viewed as ambitious, since local programming in France has historically been dominated by France 3 (previously France Régions 3), a heavily subsidized public network.

On 4 July 2018 the new network was officially launched, boasting a reach of 32 million potential viewers across 22 affiliates.

In March 2019, Médias du Sud and Magin opted to cut their losses in the French Antilles market by officially closing down their offices in Guadeloupe and Guyane, rather than resuming their production of original content. Later that month, Médias du Sud registered the trademark ViàGroupe, which would become the company's new name shortly after.

=== Aborted merger and contraction ===
In April 2020, French media regulatory authority CSA approved a merger plan between ViàGroupe's five channels and Altice's own nascent network BFM Régions. BFM already held a minority participation in ViàGroupe's ViàOccitanie Toulouse.

In December 2020, Altice rescinded its merger offer, alleging that it had discovered unexpected liabilities while examining the network's financials in prevision of the merger. Days later, Ledoux's channel ViàGrand Paris went into receivership, followed in January 2021 by ViàGroupe. Their respective assets were sold to separate investors.

ViàGrand Paris went to an alliance between daily newspaper Le Figaro, and Lille area media company Groupe SECOM. In early July 2021, it was replaced by Museum TV Paris, a local version of SECOM's national art channel Museum TV.

The ViàOccitanie channels went to Groupe La Dépêche du Midi, publisher of the eponymous daily, although the Nîmes broadcast licence was subjected to a new tender by the CSA, which La Dépêche du Midi won uncontested.

With ViàRéseau's national infrastructure in disarray following the demise of its founders' companies, affiliates ViàLMTV Sarthe, ViàMoselle TV and ViàVosges have reverted to their original identity.

== Programming ==
The failure of previous French local television ventures has been attributed to a lack of recognizable properties like sports, a deficiency that Vià sought to address.

=== Rugby league ===
With most of France's top rugby league clubs based in the network's historic market of Occitanie, Vià has been a natural broadcasting partner for the sport. The national ViàRéseau network broadcast Team France games from the 2018 Rugby League European Championship. Coverage of domestic club competitions such as the Elite 1 league and the Coupe de France has typically been shown on the ViàOccitanie subnetwork.

=== Other sports ===
Vià's first sports broadcasting agreement was with women's basketball team Lattes Montpellier, whose Euroleague games have been shown on the ViàOccitanie subnetwork since its days as TVSud.

In May 2019, Vià broadcast volleyball's Ligue A Masculine finals.
In the summer of 2019, the network expressed interest in a Game of the Week program featuring women's handball's Ligue Butagaz Énergie, but the bid did not get past the preliminary stages and the broadcasting rights went to Sport en France.

In 2021 and 2022, the ViàOccitanie channels broadcast live tennis from Montpellier's ATP 250 tournament.

In 2022, ViàATV started broadcasting live stages from the Tour de Martinique, a road cycling race.

=== Other programming ===
Vià's flagship entertainment property was Bethewone, a short-lived interactive game show using a mobile app, broadcast during the fall of 2017. It was hosted by Julien Lepers, the former host of Questions pour un champion (the French version of Going For Gold).

== ViàRéseau channel roster ==
Original channels, brought to the network by founding partners Musset and Ledoux:

- ViàOccitanie subnetwork
  - ViàOccitanie Montpellier
  - ViàOccitanie Pays Catalan
  - ViaOccitanie Pays Gardois
  - ViàOccitanie Toulouse
- ATV subnetwork
  - ViàATV (Martinique)
  - ~~ViàGuadeloupe~~
  - ~~ViàGuyane~~
- ~~ViàGrand Paris~~

Third-party channels that adopted the Vià branding and participated in viàfrance.tv, a collaborative Internet news portal:

- ViàAngers
  Channel name has since reverted to Angers Télé
- ViàLMtv Sarthe
  Channel name has since reverted to LMtv Sarthe
- ViàMATÉLÉ (Saint-Quentin)
  Channel name has since reverted to MATÉLÉ
- ViàMoselle TV
  Channel name has since changed to Moselle TV
- ViaTéléPaese (Corsica)
  Channel name has since reverted to TéléPaese
- ViàVosges
  Channel name has since reverted to Vosges TV

Channels that signed the network's protocol, but opted for a waiting period and did not transition to the Vià branding:

- Wéo
  - Wéo Lille
  - Wéo Picardie
- Télévision Bretagne
  - Tébéo (Western Brittany)
  - Tébésud (Morbihan)
- La Chaîne Normande
  Channel name has since reverted to BFM Normandie
- Télénantes
- Télévision Locale du Choletais
- Demain TV (employment and entrepreneurship channel)
