= Television in France =

Television in France was introduced in 1931, when the first experimental broadcasts began. Colour television was introduced in October 1967 on La Deuxième Chaîne.

== History ==
During the regime of Charles De Gaulle, television was seen as "the government in the dining room every evening", as the 8pm news bulletin often started with a report on his activities. Instead of opting for the PAL format, France invented its own (SECAM).

During the events of May 1968, it was evident that ORTF's television news was manipulated and its Friday night programme Panorama was suppressed because it aimed to talk about students' complaints.

== Digital terrestrial television ==
TNT logo.

France's digital terrestrial television network, known locally as TNT (from the literal translation in French, télévision numérique terrestre), was launched on 31 March 2005 after a short testing period. Like Freeview in the UK, it provides many new channels, as well as the current terrestrial television stations. Like the rest of Europe, France uses the DVB-T transmission technology.

The 14 first digital free channels were launched on 31 March 2005: TF1, France 2, France 3, Canal+ (unencrypted programmes only), France 5, Arte, C8, W9, TMC, NT1, NRJ 12, La Chaîne parlementaire and France 4. In October and November, 4 additional free channels were added: the 24h news channels BFM TV and I-Télé, the music and entertainment youth channel Europe 2 TV, and the free children's channel Gulli, a joint-venture between Lagardère Active and France Télévisions. Pay channels were progressively added until March 2006: TPS Star, Paris Première, Canal+ Sport, Canal+ Cinéma(s), AB1, Planète, TF6, Canal J, LCI and Eurosport.

Regional channels started to launch on the TNT on 13 September 2007.

Due to the unsuccess of the pay-DTT, the terrestrial broadcast was abandoned by AB1 on 30 October 2008 and Canal J on 30 April 2009.

On 14 December 2010, the CSA selected CFoot to relaunch a pay terrestrial channel. This channel was owned by the Ligue de Football Professionnel, to raise the stakes of French football leagues, and was launched on 28 July 2011 on the LCN 34 of the TNT (formerly assigned to AB1). With the arrival of BeIN Sports, CFoot closed on 31 May 2012. In addition, TPS Star closed in the same month.

TF1 and M6 closed their pay channel TF6 on 31 December 2014. On 21 January 2015, Eurosport ceased its terrestrial broadcast after TF1 sold it to Discovery.

By 2012, the digital terrestrial television services were expected to cover at least 95% of the French metropolitan population. Five high-definition (HD) channels (four free-to-air and one subscription) were launched in October 2008 using also the H.264 format. In September 2005, pay television channels were launched that use the MPEG-4 format, unlike most of Europe, which uses MPEG-2.

Pay-per-view terrestrial channels use H.264. TNT is the first service to implement Dolby Digital Plus as an audio codec on its high-definition channels. Viewers must buy a TV set (or set-top box) that supports both MPEG-4 H.264 and DD+ to enjoy HD channels.

Analog broadcasts were switched off on 30 November 2011 on all platforms, whether it is terrestrial, satellite or cable. Overseas departments and territories (such as French Guiana and Martinique) also terminated all analog broadcasts on the same day.

=== DTT transition ===
By 2008, 34% of the French population was using analogue TV as an only reception mode. The next year, the city of Coulommiers switched to digital-only TV, serving as a test city for TDF. By the end of 2009, analog TV was shut off in the Nord Cotentin, and TDF reported no major reception problems. Citizens in DTT test zones were informed that analog TV would shut down by early 2009, and consequently they adapted their installation.

For the rest of the country, the shut-off progressed by regions, more precisely France 3 regions. It means that every transmitters broadcasting France 3 Méditerranée Provence-Alpes went digital-terrestrial on the same date, another date for those that broadcast France 3 Bourgogne Franche-Comté. The analog shut-off occurred in 2010 in the north; the south was the last to phase out analog television broadcasts.

For three months before shutting down an analogue transmitter, it transmitted the DTT multiplexes so that viewers could adapt their installation on time. Also, a message was displayed as marquee on analog channels warning the viewer that they would no longer receive TV if they did not switch to digital. To help people installing their DTT reception equipment, the French government created "France Télé Numérique". It made didactic videos, television advertisements, and went through the local markets, to meet people and solve their problems regarding DTT reception.

Elderly people and those with restricted financial conditions, received help from the French government; so that they could switch to DTT easily.

The most common adapters sold in the market only decode MPEG-2 and have only one SCART output socket. Old TV sets (before 1980) need a UHF modulator between the TV and the set-top box, as they have no SCART socket. Unlike VCRs, DVB-T set-top boxes rarely include such a modulator, and a SCART to RCA adaptor is often needed to feed the modulator with the signal. The solution recommended by France Télé Numérique is just to buy a new TV set instead of using a modulator.

On 30 October 2008, the TNT HD was launched with four national channels: TF1, France 2, M6 and Arte.

On 8 June 2010, the overseas France dedicated channel France Ô became available nationally on TNT channel 19, taking the vacant frequencies of AB1 which left the pay-DTT. Before, it was available locally in Île-de-France starting from 24 September 2007.

On 30 November 2010, the digital terrestrial television launched in Overseas France, with 8 public channels: La Première, France 2, France 3, France 4, France 5, France Ô, Arte and France 24 (replaced by France Info on 8 April 2019). Most territories also have up to three local private channels.

On 12 December 2012, six new HD national channels were launched (HD1, L'Équipe 21, 6ter, Numéro 23, RMC Découverte and Chérie 25).

On 5 April 2016, the Metropolitan France fully transitioned to MPEG-4 with HDTV for almost all channels, and LCI became free-to-air.

On 1 September 2016, France Télévisions launched its news channel France Info on channel 27. France Ô was downgraded to SD to make place for France Info.

France Ô closed on 24 August 2020. France Info was upgraded to HD in Metropolitan France, and La Première were upgraded to HD in Overseas France.

On 1 February 2021, France Télévisions launched Culturebox on channel 19, to promote cultural events during the COVID-19 pandemic. France 4 and France Info were downgraded to SD to make room on the multiplex. On 1 May, Culturebox starts timesharing with France 4, which returned to HD with France Info.

France 2 started to roll out its Ultra HD feed in January 2024 on the DTT, after many experimental UHD tests from TDF since 2018, and France 3 UHD has also been available during the 2024 Summer Olympics.

In 2024, the ARCOM reviewed the DTT licences, and cancelled the frequencies from C8 and NRJ 12 which ended on 28 February 2025, on the main basis of their failure to fulfill their programming obligations, and reallocated them to new groups with Réels TV and OFTV projects then launched as T18 and Novo 19. As a consequence, Canal+ has cancelled the terrestrial licenses of all its pay channels which ended on 6 June 2025. The Arcom thus used this date to introduce its re-numbering, when the public services France 4 and LCP-Public Sénat were reallocated to channels 4 and 8 respectively, creating a block of news channels from 13 to 16, Gulli was awarded the channel 12, after TFX which is partially aimed at the same target in morning time slots and T18 launched on its former slot. In same day, pay-TV Paris Première was reallocated to channel 26. Novo 19 launched later on 1 September.

=== DTT on satellite ===
TNT channels are also available for reception by satellite, broadcast from the Astra satellites at 19.2° east with TNT SAT and from Eutelsat 5 West B with FRANSAT. Some of the channels are encrypted but there is no subscription charge, and both the set-top box and viewing card (valid for four years) that are required are available from hypermarkets. The Franco-German channel Arte is available in free-to-air.

During the 2010 FIFA World Cup, France 2 and France 3 were blacked out to viewers outside France. France 2, 3 and 4 were also blacked out outside France during the 2018 FIFA World Cup when they shared French TV rights for the tournament with TF1 and beIN Sports.

== Other technologies ==
Most internet service providers in France now offer digital television (IPTV) packages through triple-play set-top box as part of fibre link packages or DSL link packages. However, some DSL subscribers have too much attenuation distortion on their lines to benefit from the service, and France does not yet have 100% DSL coverage. The main IPTV providers are Orange, SFR, Free and Bouygues Telecom.

French cable providers France Telecom Cable, Noos SA and UPC France SA and Numericable merged to become the largest cable operator in France, which was then merged info SFR. The SFR cable offer is part of their high speed offer and provides cable television and IPTV using FTLA approach EuroDocsis 3.0 compatible set top boxes.

Digital satellite television in France was launched in 1996. HDTV transmissions began in April 2006, when CanalSat launched its first HD channel (Canal+ HD). Télévision Par Satellite and CanalSat merged in 2007, leaving Nouveau Canalsat and Bis Télévisions as the two main competitors for the satellite television market in the country.

== Media groups ==
=== Dominant groups ===
Four companies dominate the French TV market:

- Groupe TF1 (owned by Bouygues), which owns TF1, TMC, TFX, TF1 Séries Films and LCI
- France Télévisions, which regroups state-owned channels with France 2, France 3, France 4, France 5, franceinfo: and 45% of Arte
- Groupe M6 (owned by RTL Group), which owns M6, W9, 6ter and Gulli
- Canal+ S.A., which is the main pay-TV company and owns CNews and CStar

==== Other important groups ====
- RMC BFM (owned by CMA CGM): BFM TV, RMC Story, RMC Découverte, RMC Life and a BFM regional network
- Mediawan Thematics: Pay channels

==== Minor group ====
- Groupe Amaury: L'Équipe
- CMI France: T18
- Groupe Sipa – Ouest-France: Novo 19

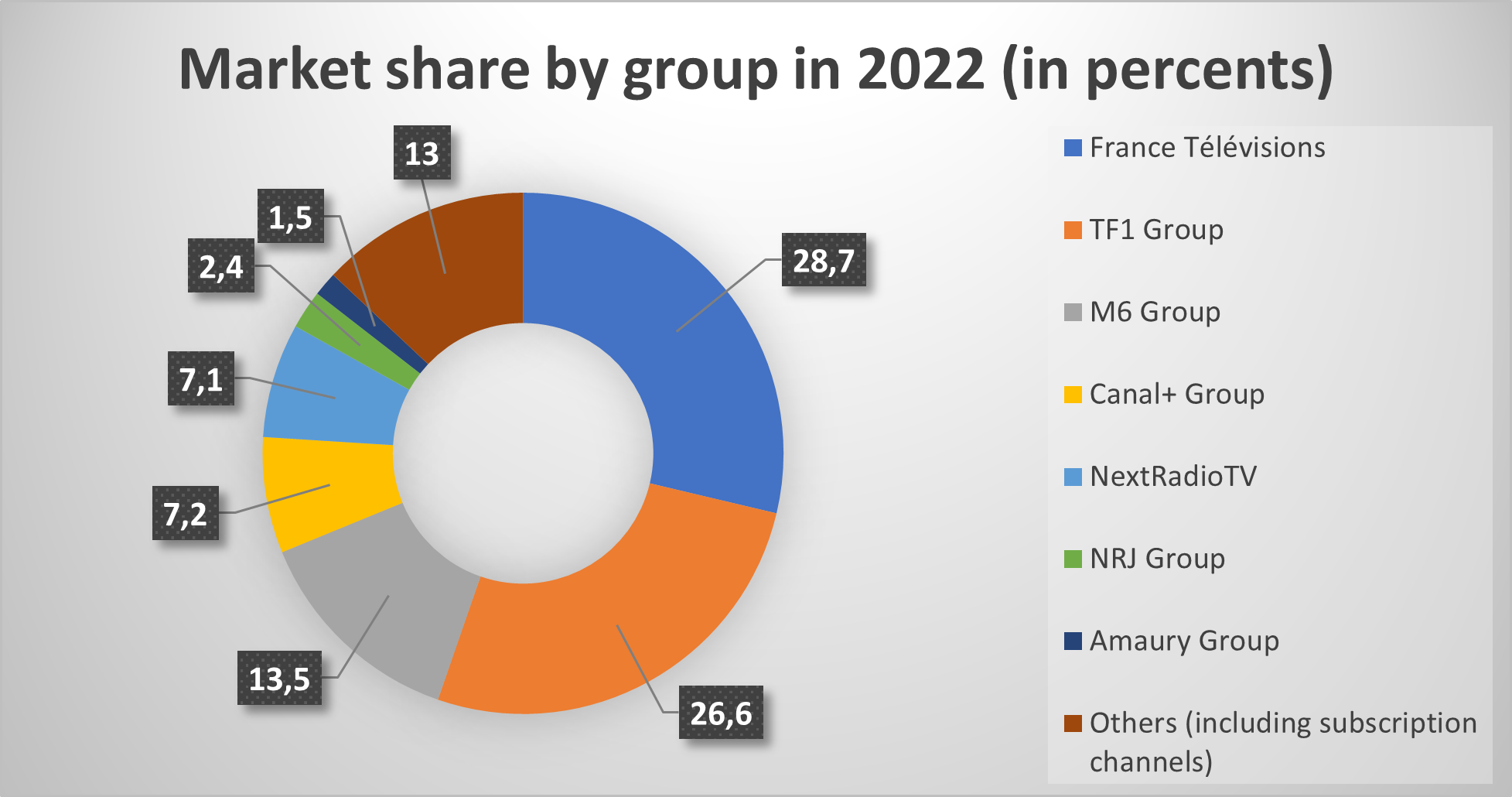
Market shares by groups in 2022

== Viewing shares ==
Yearly viewing shares in 2022 (not including subscription channels):

LCP-Public Sénat is not counted because it is not destined to be profitable. France 4 shared its channel with Culturebox from May 3, 2021 and was no longer counted in the ratings until June 2025.

Canal	Channel	Position	Owner	Theme(s)	Share of total viewing (%) in 2022	Evolution in comparison to 2021 (%)
1	TF1	1	TF1 Group	General programs	18.7	-1.0
2	France 2	2	France Télévisions (state-owned)	General programs	14.8	+0.1
3	France 3	3	France Télévisions (state-owned)	General programs, Regional	9.4	=
6	M6	4	M6 Group	General programs	8.4	-0.7
5	France 5	5	France Télévisions (state-owned)	General programs, Culture, Family	3.6	+0.3
10	TMC	7	TF1 Group	General programs	3.0	=
7	Arte	8	Arte (state-owned)	Culture	2.9	=
9	W9	10	M6 Group	General programs, Music	2.3	-0.2
13	BFM TV	6	NextRadioTV	24/7 news	3.3	+0.4
24	RMC Découverte	12	NextRadioTV	Documentaries	1.9	-0.1
11	TFX	17	TF1 Group	General, Reality TV, Children	1.5	=
20	TF1 Séries Films	14	TF1 Group	Fiction, Movies	1.7	-0.2
22	6ter	16	M6 Group	Family	1.6	+0.1
4	France 4 / Culturebox	-	France Télévisions (state-owned)	General programs, Youth, Culture	Uncounted	-
12	Gulli	20	M6 Group	Family/Children	1.2	=
21	L'Équipe	18	Amaury Group	Sports	1.5	+0.2
23	RMC Story	13	NextRadioTV	General programs	1.9	+0.3
17	CStar	23	Canal+ Group	Music	1.1	=
25	RMC Life	19	NextRadioTV	-	-	-
15	LCI	15	TF1 Group	24/7 news	1.7	+0.6
14	CNews	11	Canal+ Group	24/7 news	2.1	+0.1
16	franceinfo:	24	France Télévisions, Radio France, INA, France Médias Monde (state-owned)	24/7 news	0.9	+0.2
18	T18	-	-	-	-	-
19	Novo 19	-	-	-	-	-
8	LCP-Public Sénat	-	French Parliament	Politics, News	Uncounted	-

== See also ==
- List of television stations in France
- List of French-language television channels
- List of French television series
- List of years in French television
