= Roumoules =

- Commune
- Coat of arms
- Location of Roumoules
- Location within France Location within Provence-Alpes-Côte d'Azur
- Coordinates: 43°49′35″N 6°07′50″E
- Country: France
- Region: Provence-Alpes-Côte d'Azur
- Department: Alpes-de-Haute-Provence
- Arrondissement: Forcalquier
- Canton: Riez
- Intercommunality: Durance-Luberon-Verdon Agglomération

Government
  - Mayor (2026–32): Gilles Megis
- Area^{1}: 26.04 km^{2} (10.05 sq mi)
- Elevation: 600 m (2,000 ft)
- Highest elevation: 783 m (2,569 ft)
- Lowest elevation: 545 m (1,788 ft)
- Population (2023): 725
  - Density: 27.8/km^{2} (72.1/sq mi)
- Time zone: UTC+01:00 (CET)
  - Summer (DST): UTC+02:00 (CEST)
- INSEE/Postal code: 04172 /04500
- ^{1} French Land Register data, which excludes lakes, ponds, glaciers > 1 km^{2} (0.386 sq mi or 247 acres) and river estuaries.

Roumoules (French pronunciation: [ʁumul]; Occitan: Romolas) is a commune in the Alpes-de-Haute-Provence department in southeastern France.

== Population ==
Historical population
Year	Pop.	±% p.a.
1968	214	—
1975	249	+2.19%
1982	301	+2.75%
1990	469	+5.70%
1999	631	+3.35%
2007	733	+1.89%
2012	694	−1.09%
2017	746	+1.46%
2023	725	−0.47%
Source: INSEE

== See also ==
- Roumoules radio transmitter
- Communes of the Alpes-de-Haute-Provence department
