= Télé Lyon Métropole =

Private local TV channel

Télé Lyon Métropole was a private local TV channel in the greater Lyon area.

== History ==
Télé Lyon Métropole (TLM) was launched on 25 November 1988 by Roger Caille, director of Jet Services, in the Tour du Crédit Lyonnais. Programming took place at 21 Boulevard Yves Farge in Lyon on 20 February 1989. TLM is the oldest local TV channel in France.

On 10 October 2018, Altice acquired the channel, announcing its integration into the BFM network. On 1 July 2019, it was announced that the channel would shut down and be replaced by BFM Lyon, part of the BFM Locales network. Of its successor's fifteen reporters, a part of them were inherited from TLM.

== Organisation ==
Directors: Jean-Marc Dubois became the boss of TLM, Jean-Pierre Vacher succeeded him in 2004 and he will remain the general director of the channel until 2019.

1988–1993:

- Roger Caille, Director of Jet Services (Creator of the Channel, 1988–1989)

1994–2001:

- Louis-Bertrand Raffour.
- Etienne Mallet.

2001–present:

- Christian Coustal, SocPresse: 2001–2006
- Gérard Colin, General Director of Le Progrès: 2006–2007.
- Pierre Fanneau, General Director of Le Progrès: 2007–present.

== See also ==
- Website of TLM
- https://archives.rhone.fr/media/4ea4fb16-05e8-45ae-aee1-61745e2892c3.pdf
