= RMC Life =

- Logo used since 1 October 2025
- Country: France

Programming
- Language: French
- Picture format: 1080i (HDTV)

Ownership
- Owner: RMC BFM
- Parent: CMA CGM
- Sister channels: RMC Découverte; RMC Story; BFM TV; BFM2; BFM Business; BFM Locales; Tech & Co

History
- Launched: 12 December 2012; 13 years ago
- Former names: Chérie HD (project); Chérie 25 (2012–2025)

Availability

Terrestrial
- TNT: Channel 25 (HD)

RMC Life, formerly known as Chérie 25 (pronounced [ʃeʁi vɛ̃sɛ̃k]), is a French TV channel, controlled by the RMC BFM. Chérie 25 was launched on TNT, satellite, and xDSL on 12 December 2012.

== History ==
In 2011, Jean-Paul Baudecroux, the president of NRJ Group, proposed a television project to launch a new channel named Chérie HD.

In 2012, following the shutdown of analogue television, the Conseil supérieur de l'audiovisuel (CSA) auditioned the NRJ Group following its application for an additional channel from one of the six national high-definition channels on TNT, and finally had chosen Chérie HD.

In October 2012, two months before the station was launched, the name Chérie HD was changed to Chérie 25, with 25 referring to the channel's number on the French digital terrestrial television (TNT).

In 2025, after that NRJ 12's digital terrestrial television frequency was not renewed by ARCOM, the NRJ Group considered selling or returning frequency number 25 (it was due to be renewed in 2027), to leave the digital terrestrial television sector. The sale was confirmed on March 21, 2025 and will be mandated by the Lazard bank. Rodolphe Saadé (CMA-CGM which owns RMC-BFM as well as a 10.25% stake in the capital of the M6 group) and the Czech billionaire Daniel Kretinsky (CMI France) who owns the future television channel T18, showed keen interest in the purchase of Chérie 25.

== Programmes ==
- 10 ans de moins
- 99% plaisir
- Good Morning Business
- Ma vie de femme criminelle
- Ma vie de femme d'ailleurs
- Ma vie de femme intime
- Ma vie de femme enceinte
- Real Housewives of Beverly Hills
- Sans tabou,
- Si vous voulez mon avis
- Tout le plaisir est pour moi
- La nouvelle vie de Tori Spelling

=== TV Series ===
- Blood Ties
- Bomb Girls
- Dos au mur
- Hot in Cleveland
- La Vie secrète d'une ado ordinaire
- Melrose Place
- Orgueil et Préjugés
- Pacific Homicide
- Roxane ou la Vie Sexuelle de ma Pote
- Rookie Blue
- Royal Pains
- The Middle
- The Tudors
- Titanic: Blood and Steel
- The X-Files

== See also ==
- List of television stations in France
