= RMC (France) =

French radio station

Monte-Carlo Paris (Studios); France
- Broadcast area: France; Monaco
- Frequencies: 103.1 (Paris); 98.8 (Monaco); 104.3 (Marseille); 104.2 (Lyon); Full list of frequencies

Programming
- Language: French
- Format: Talk; News; Sports

Ownership
- Owner: RMC BFM (99.9 %); Principality of Monaco (0.1 %)
- Sister stations: RMC Gold; BFM Business; BFM Radio

History
- First air date: July 1, 1943; 82 years ago
- Former call signs: Radio Monte-Carlo (1943–1981); RMC (1981–2001); RMC Info (2001–2002)

Links
- Webcast: RMC Live Stream
- Website: rmc.bfmtv.com

RMC is a private French-Monégasque radio station created in 1943, broadcasting from France with studios in Paris and Monte-Carlo. RMC stands for Radio Monte-Carlo.

== History ==
Radio Monte-Carlo was created on 1 July 1943. In 1950, Radio Monte-Carlo became one of 23 founding broadcasting organisations of the European Broadcasting Union. Since 1995, the Monegasque membership has been held by Groupement de Radiodiffuseurs Monégasques (GRMC), a joint organisation by Monaco Media Diffusion (MMD), Radio Monte-Carlo (RMC) and Télé Monte-Carlo (TMC).
