= RMC Story =

- Logo used since 17 December 2025
- Country: France
- Broadcast area: France
- Headquarters: Paris, France

Programming
- Language: French
- Picture format: 576i (16:9 SDTV); 1080i (HDTV)

Ownership
- Owner: RMC BFM
- Parent: CMA CGM
- Sister channels: RMC Découverte; RMC Life; BFM TV; BFM2; BFM Business; BFM Locales; Tech & Co

History
- Launched: 1 December 2012; 13 years ago
- Founder: Pascal Houzelot
- Former names: Numéro 23 (2012–2018)

Links
- Website: www.rmcstory.bfmtv.com

Availability

Terrestrial
- TNT: Channel 23

RMC Story, formerly known as Numéro 23 and initially as TVous La télédiversité, is a French independent TV television channel founded by Diversité TV France. It launched its broadcasts on 12 December 2012 and is the 23rd national television channel in France.

== History ==
=== Origin and beginning of broadcasts ===
When process was announced for the addition of six new national channels in France on TNT (Télévision Numérique Terrestre en France), the Conseil supérieur de l'audiovisuel (CSA) accepted the application of société Diversité TV France on 8 March 2012 as the 23rd national channel with La télédiversité, URb TV et TVous La télédiversité combined as one entity on TNT HD, on condition of incorporating the programming of URb TV under the umbrella of TVous La télédiversité.

On 5 June 2012, TVous La télédiversité signed the convention with the CSA but requested change of name of the licensed channel from TVous La télédiversité to Numéro 23. Official broadcasts started on 12 December 2012. Facing competition by HD1 (20th channel), L'Équipe 21 (21st channel), 6ter (22nd channel), RMC Découverte (24th channel), Numéro 23 could sustain increasing audiences from 0.2% initially in 2014 to almost 0.7% in March 2015.

=== Sale of the channel and threat of revocation of license ===
On 2 April 2015, Pascal Houzelot, owner of the channel announced he was negotiating sale of the channel now estimated at 88.3 million euros to NextRadioTV that already owned BFM TV and RMC Découverte both on TNT as well as BFM Business. Controversy arose about the sale as being a contradiction of the stated objectives in the allocation of transmission authorization given by the Conseil supérieur de l'audiovisuel (CSA), the authority entrusted with distribution of French broadcast channels. Also opposing the deal that would consolidate substantial broadcasting rights in one corporation were made by managements of TF1, M6 and Canal+ amongst many. Olivier Schrameck, president of CSA, described the sale deal as shocking and troubling. In July 2015, a partnership of Alain Weill and Altice bought shares of NextRadioTV. On 9 December 2015, CSA announced it was referring the matter to the Conseil d'État alleging fraud by the original owners of Numéro 23 in acquiring the licence under false pretexts. It also announced its revocation of the broadcasting license to Numéro 23 on TNT effective 30 June 2016.

On 30 March 2016, the Conseil d’État reversed this decision by CSA also saying fraudulent representation alleged by CSA on behalf of the owners of Numéro 23 could not be established. On 16 April 2016 Numéro 23 officialized NextRadioTV's capitalization at 39% of the shares of Numéro 23.

=== Ownership and key people ===
Pascal Houzelot founder of Pink TV is its president and Damien Cuier its director general. The channel is headquartered in 17 rue du Pont-aux-Choux in 3e arrondissement in Paris.

=== Selection of programming ===
Popular series included rebroadcasts reality television series from USA, Canada, Germany, Australia etc. in addition to a string of French programming like Baie des flamboyants, B.R.I.G.A.D., Crimes en série, Fortunes, Les Bleus, Les Vacances de l'amour, Les Tricheurs and PJ. Popular series also included America's Best Dance Crew, Amazing Race USA, the tattooing programme Best Ink, X Factor USA, X Factor UK, You Can Dance USA etc.

In 2016, due to the involvement of Altice in NextRadioTV, the channel began to broadcast a weekly English Premier League match.
