= Cap 24 =

- Country: France
- Broadcast area: Île-de-France

History
- Launched: 20 March 2008
- Closed: 12 October 2010

Links
- Website: www.cap24.com

Availability

Terrestrial
- TNT (Île-de-France): Channel 24

Cap 24 was a French regional television channel, available in Paris and Île-de-France region, broadcasting from the Eiffel Tower. It began broadcasting on 20 March 2008.

== History ==
On 5 June 2007, the Conseil supérieur de l'audiovisuel (CSA) gave Cap 24 (under the name Côté Seine), one of the four regional slots on the Télévision Numérique Terrestre (TNT) service. The channel changed to its current name at its launch on 20 March 2008.
