= RMC Découverte =

- Logo used since 17 December 2025
- Country: France
- Broadcast area: France
- Headquarters: Paris, France

Programming
- Language: French
- Picture format: 576i (16:9 SDTV); 1080i (HDTV)

Ownership
- Owner: RMC BFM
- Parent: CMA CGM
- Sister channels: RMC Story; RMC Life; BFM TV; BFM2; BFM Business; BFM Locales; Tech & Co

History
- Launched: 12 December 2012; 13 years ago

Links
- Website: rmcdecouverte.bfmtv.com

Availability

Terrestrial
- TNT: Channel 24

RMC Découverte is a French television channel broadcast on channel 24 and owned by RMC BFM. Created in 2012, it mainly broadcasts documentaries such as Wheeler Dealers, Ancient Aliens, Swamp Loggers. RMC Découverte broadcasts the French version of the British show Top Gear.

== History ==
After the announcement of the Superior council of audiovisual for a call for candidate of six channels emitting on French TNT in high definition, the group NextRadioTV sends three files: RMC Sport HD (a sport channel), RMC Découverte broadcasting documentaries and BFM Business, an economic channel already broadcasting in the Paris TNT area. NextRadioTV chooses the name RMC Découverte for its documentary channel in order to promote RMC radio, which the group also owns but which is not received by all the French population due to its broadcasting on FM broadcasting.

== Programming ==
- +39-45 mégastructures
- Auction Hunters
- Alien Theory
- Aquamen
- Américars (Fast N' Loud)
- Bush Alaska
- Car SOS
- Cars restoration (Overhaulin')
- Champs de bataille
- Chasseurs de coffres-forts (The Safecrackers)
- Chasseur de pierres 'précieuses
- Constructions sauvages
- Destruction tout bénef ! (Bid & Destroy)
- Dirty Jobs
- Enchères à l'aveugle (Property Wars)
- Jade Fever
- Les Bûcherons de l'extrême (American Loggers)
- Les Bûcherons du marais (Swamp Loggers)
- Machines de génie
- Retour à l'instinct primaire
- Seuls face à l'Alaska (Mountain Men)
- Top Gear
- Top Gear France
- Top Gear USA
- Vintage Mecanic
- Wheeler Dealers France
- Wheeler Dealers
- Yukon Gold
- Convois XXL
- X machines de titan
