= BFM Locales =

French television network

- Network logo (2024–present)
- Type: Free-to-air television network
- Country: France
- Availability: France
- Owner: RMC BFM
- Parent: CMA CGM
- Launch date: 14 February 2019; 6 years ago (BFM Régions); 22 November 2010; 15 years ago (BFM Business Paris)
- Official website: bfmtv.com/regions
- Language: French

BFM Locales, known until 2024 as BFM Régions, is a French network of local news television channels established in 2019. It is part of the BFM family of news and financial media properties. It was partially modeled after the American News 12 Networks, and originally belonged to the same conglomerate, Altice. Today, it is a subsidiary of CMA CGM.

== Channel roster ==
=== Current ===
- BFM Lyon
- BFM Grand Lille
- BFM Grand Littoral
- BFM DICI Alpes du Sud
- BFM DICI Haute-Provence
- BFM Marseille Provence
- BFM Toulon Var
- BFM Nice Côte-d'Azur
- BFM Alsace
- BFM Normandie

=== Former ===
- BFM Paris Île-de-France

== History ==
=== Origins as BFM Business Paris ===
At the inception of French digital terrestrial television in the second half of the 2000s, BFM's then parent company NextRadioTV only expressed moderate interest in the local TV market. It did bid for a licence to broadcast in Paris, but was not selected. However one of the winning channels, Cap 24, found itself on the market in 2010 after parent company Groupe Hersant Media decided to wind down its struggling Antennes Locales network. Cap 24 was first sold to Bernard Krief Consulting, a controversial LBO specialist, then quickly sold again to NextRadioTV.

NextRadioTV did not immediately put a full-fledged local channel in Cap 24's slot. Beginning in November 2010, it broadcast BFM Business Paris, a variant of its non-terrestrial national business news channel BFM Business. It was largely the same as the national version, with three hours of daily local programming thrown in to comply with France's local television mandates.

=== Expansion and BFM Régions network ===
In the summer of 2015, French multinational Altice became a major shareholder in NextRadioTV, with the latter's chairman Alain Weill touting the expanded strategic opportunities afforded by the alliance. In the fall of 2016, BFM bid for the Toulouse local broadcast licence (left vacant by the previous operator's bankruptcy), but withdrew at the last minute and took a minority participation in the competing project, TV Sud Toulouse (later ViàOccitanie Toulouse), following some pushback from independent television trade groups.

2019–24 logo, as BFM Régions

In November 2016, BFM Business Paris was rebranded as BFM Paris, now a true capital region channel built around a majority of local programming. In October 2018, BFM finally added another local station to its portfolio: TLM (Télé Lyon Métropole). Access to the country's second largest media market formally paved the way for a national network. In February 2019, the network officially became known as "BFM Régions". TLM started broadcasting as BFM Lyon Métropole in September 2019 and just BFM Lyon in January 2020.

In November 2019, BFM acquired a significant minority share in two local channels owned by Lille area company Groupe SECOM: Grand Lille TV and Grand Littoral TV (the latter serving the Calais-Dunkirk market). In February 2020, both channels officially became BFM Grand Lille and BFM Grand Littoral. In the same transaction, BFM bought a stake in Grand Lille TV's sister radio station Grand Lille Info, which became Radio BFM Grand Lille.

=== Aborted merger with Vià and continued expansion ===
In March 2020, Altice entered an agreement with Vià to merge that network's owned-and-operated stations with BFM Régions. Altice later backed out of the deal, arguing that its prospective partners had purposely underestimated the debt load of Vià's corporate entities. They went into receivership soon after. Altice bid for some of their assets but in April 2021, the Nîmes Commercial Court decided in favor of another buyer, La Dépêche du Midi, which was the employees' preferred choice.

In the summer of 2020, BFM acquired DICI (stylized D!CI), a small market but highly rated channel serving the southern part of the French Alps. In March 2021, it was replaced by two sister channels: BFM DICI Alpes-du-Sud (Hautes-Alpes) and BFM DICI Haute-Provence (Alpes-de-Haute-Provence). In February 2021, Altice bought Azur TV, a regional network of three southeastern channels: Azur TV (Nice), Provence Azur TV (Marseille-Menton) and Toulon Azur TV, from Valeurs Actuelles publisher Iskandar Safa. In July 2021, their replacements BFM Nice Côte d'Azur, BFM Marseille Provence and BFM Toulon Var went on air.

In March 2022, BFM Paris was renamed "BFM Paris Île-de-France" to signify its broader regional reach. A few months after their respective purchases by Altice, Strasbourg-based Alsace 20 joined the network as BFM Alsace in June 2022, while La Chaîne Normande, whose headquarters are located in Rouen, became BFM Normandie in September.

=== Sale, rebrand as BFM Locales and closure of Paris channel ===
On 2 July 2024, the sale of Altice's media division to freight company CMA CGM was finalized, which included BFM Régions. That fall, member channels underwent a graphic makeover and the network was renamed "BFM Locales." In December 2024, it was announced that BFM Paris Île-de-France would close in the first half of 2025. The channel's persistent losses were attributed to redundancy with Paris-based national media and insufficient support from local authorities. It was shut down on 14 March 2025. BFM Locales announced that it would migrate its Paris-centric content to its web platforms, and prioritize beefing up the remaining affiliates' schedules in the face of impending competition from a new national channel aimed at provincial audiences, Novo 19.

== Sports ==
In addition to general news coverage, BFM Locales has branched out into live sports, which make for an attractive content differentiator. Some of this programming is produced by sister premium channel RMC Sport, another CMA CGM property.

=== Association football ===
- Championnat National (2025–present)
- Network affiliates have also broadcast qualifying rounds of the UEFA Champions League and UEFA Conference League on a per-game basis.

=== Basketball ===
- Network affiliates have broadcast the LNB Pro B and men's Coupe de France on a per-game basis.

=== Ice hockey ===
- Synerglace Ligue Magnus (2024–present)

=== Rugby union ===
- Network affiliates have broadcast the Nationale division on a per-game basis.

=== Volleyball ===
- LNV Ligue A Féminine (2022–23)
- Network affiliates have also broadcast other events on a per-game basis, such as the men's and women's Coupe de France finals in 2024.
