= RMC BFM =

French media company

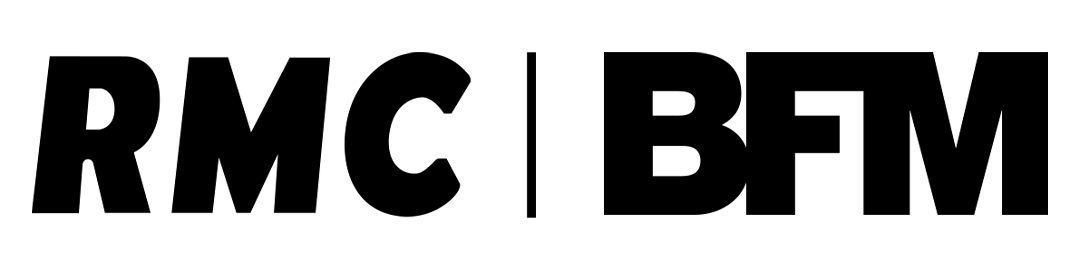
- Formerly: NextRadio (2000–2005); NextRadioTV (2005–2021); Altice Média (2021–2024)
- Type: Division
- Founded: 2000; 26 years ago
- Headquarters: Paris, France
- Area served: France
- Parent: CMA Média (CMA CGM)
- Website: rmcbfm.com

RMC BFM is a French media company, division of CMA CGM.

== History ==
In 2000, the NextRadioTV company was founded by Alain Weill, who was chairman and chief executive officer. In 2021, NextRadioTV was renamed to Altice Média to accentuate the group's multi-media convergence around 5 themes: information, economy, sport, high-tech and discovery.

Four months after announcing that it had reached a deal, Altice completed the sale of its media division in July 2024 to CMA CGM. The company was later renamed RMC BFM.

== Operations ==
=== Radio stations ===
- BFM Business
- BFM Radio
- RMC
- RMC Gold
- BFM Grand Lille (radio)

=== TV stations ===
- BFM TV – national news channel, launched on November 28 2005 at 6pm
- BFM2 – news channel, launched on September 25th 2024 at 3pm
- BFM Business – business news channel, launched in the morning of November 22 2010
- RMC Story – generalist channel, formerly called Numéro 23, who airs Apolline Matin, Les GG, Estelle Midi and Super Moscato Show, launched on December 12 2012 at 8:30pm
- RMC Découverte – documentary channel, launched on December 12 2012 at 1pm
- RMC Life – generalist channel, formerly called Chérie 25, who airs Good Morning Business, on BFM Business, launched on December 12 2012 at 12:55pm
- BFM Locales – regional news networks
  - BFM Alsace (launched on June 28 2022 at 5pm)
  - BFM DICI (launched on March 9 2021 at 5pm)
  - BFM Grand Lille (launched on February 3 2020 along with BFM Grand Littoral at 7pm)
  - BFM Grand Littoral launched on February 3 2020 along with BFM Grand Lille at 7pm)
  - BFM Lyon (launched on September 3 2019 at 8pm)
  - BFM Marseille Provence (launched on July 5th 2021 along with BFM Nice Côte d'Azur and BFM Toulon Var at 6pm, then officially on October 26 2021 at 5pm)
  - BFM Nice Côte d'Azur (launched on July 5th 2021 along with BFM Marseille Provence and BFM Toulon Var, then officially on October 27 2021 at 5pm, 5 hours after BFM Toulon Var)
  - BFM Normandie (launched on September 28 2022 at 5pm)
  - BFM Toulon Var (launched on July 5th 2021 along with BFM Nice Côte d'Azur and BFM Marseille Provence, then officially on October 27 2021 at 12pm, 5 hours before BFM Nice Côte d'Azur)
- RMC Sport – sports channels
  - RMC Sport 1, formerly called SFR Sport 1
  - The defunct RMC Sport 2, formerly called Ma Chaîne Sport and SFR Sport 2
  - The defunct RMC Sport 3, formerly called MCS Extrême and SFR Sport 3
  - The defunct RMC Sport 4, formerly called Kombat Sport and SFR Sport 5
  - The defunct RMC Sport 1 UHD, formerly called SFR Sport 4K and RMC Sport UHD
- The defunct My Cuisine, formerly called MCS Maison
- The defunct MCS Bien Etre, now on Dailymotion
- The defunct MCS Tennis, Fused with SFR Sport 2
- The new MCS Extrême, a brand new platform
- The defunct UFC Premium, Fused with SFR Sport 5.
- Tech & Co – a channel based on 01net.com, formerly called 01TV, and launched on January 6th 2020.

=== Groupe 01 ===
NextRadioTV also owns the media group Groupe 01 (formerly Groupe Tests), which specializes in the field of printed magazines and on the Web:

==== Websites ====
- 01Net
- 01Men

==== Magazines ====
- Micro Hebdo
- L'Ordinateur Individuel
- 01 Informatique
