= NRJ 12 =

Former French television channel

- Country: France

Programming
- Picture format: 1080i HDTV (downscaled to 16:9 576i for the SDTV feed)

Ownership
- Owner: NRJ Group
- Sister channels: Chérie 25; NRJ Hits

History
- Launched: 31 March 2005; 21 years ago
- Closed: 1 March 2025; 18 months ago (19 years, 11 months and 1 day)

Links
- Website: www.nrj12.fr

Availability

Terrestrial
- Digital terrestrial television: Channel 12

NRJ 12 was a French commercial generalist television channel belonging to the NRJ Group, created on 31 March 2005 on DTT. The channel was available on DTT, cable, satellite and ADSL.

In 2024, its authorization to broadcast on DTT was not renewed by Arcom. With the end of its broadcasting on DTT on 1 March 2025, the channel has been shut down on all platforms.

== History of the channel ==
Originally called NRJ TV, this television channel project had been on the NRJ Group's agenda for a very long time. The group did not despair of returning to television following the failure of its first trial in 1986 when it joined forces with Publicis, the advertising agency Gilbert Gross, and Gaumont to create the music channel TV6 on the sixth analogue terrestrial network, which appeared in February 1986 and disappeared on Saturday 28 February 1987 at midnight after Jacques Chirac's government cancelled the concession contract signed between the State and the channel for M6.

Finally, Jean-Paul Baudecroux (Chairman of the Supervisory Board of NRJ Group) and Marc Pallain (Chairman of NRJ 12) inaugurated NRJ 12 on 31 March 2005 at 7 pm with the arrival of DTT in French households. The launch of this new channel, godchild of NRJ radio, which has existed since 1981, allowed Jean-Paul Beaudecroux to say that NRJ is taking "a revenge on time, a return to the future...". In its beginnings, in 2005, the channel broadcast many music-related shows (La tête dans le clip, Hit NRJ 12, Hit Music Only, Dedicated Hit, Tout pour la musique, etc.), series (Couleur Pacifique, Weird Science, Good Morning Miami, Time of Your Life, Susan, etc.) and anime (Gunslinger Girl, Blue Gender).

From 2007, the channel retired anime and music programs in favor of magazine shows (e.g. Tellement vrai, Tellement People, Tellement Chic) and reality television (e.g. Les Anges, L'Île des vérités, Allô Nabilla, Friends Trip, Star Academy).

In 2015, NRJ 12 set out to become a more generalist channel. The channel cut much of its former magazine and reality programming. Hosts like Matthieu Delormeau, Clara Morgane and Cauet were dismissed. New presenters like Benjamin Castaldi, Karima Charni and Valérie Damidot were introduced. At the end of 2015, NRJ 12's programme director was fired after failing to set up the new programmes: Talk Club, Unique au Monde, L'Académie des 9, Le Labo de Damidot, Face à France and Mission Plus-value. Jean-Paul Baudecroux took control and reinstated former successes like Les Anges, Friends Trip and Le Mad Mag.

Its terrestrial slot, vacated by its closure on terrestrial television, has been granted to Gulli, formerly on channel 18.

== Former logos ==
Logo from 31 March 2005 to 1 September 2007

Logo from 1 September 2007 to 31 August 2015
