= Jean-Pierre Dusséaux =

French TV film producer

Jean-Pierre Dusséaux (born 28 January 1950 in Cambrai, France) is a French television producer, screenwriter, and theatre director.

== Works ==
=== Television ===
==== Producer ====
- 1997: Le Roi en son moulin
- 1997: Les Précieuses ridicules
- 1998: Tartuffe ou l'Imposteur
- 1998: La Femme du Veuf
- 1998: Toutes les Femmes sont des Déesses, with Francis Huster
- 1998: Louis la Brocante
- 1998: Louise et les Marchés, with Line Renaud
- 1999: Ouriga with Daniel Russo
- 1999: Objectif Bac, with Clémentine Célarié
- 1999: Le Piège
- 2000: Roule routier, with Line Renaud
- 2000: L'Impromptu de Versailles
- 2000: Ça s'appelle grandir, by Alain Tasma
- 2001: L'Avare
- 2001: Écoute Nicolas
- 2002: La Grande brasserie, with Line Renaud
- 2002: Par amour, with Marthe Keller
- 2002: L'Enfant éternel with Catherine Frot
- 2002: Le Monde de Yoyo
- 2003: Les Femmes savantes
- 2003: Le Lion, with Alain Delon
- 2003: Agathe, with Florence Pernel
- 2003: Sami, le pion, with Faudel
- 2003: Le Dirlo (Lucie), with Jean-Marie Bigard
- 2003: Le Prix de l'honneur, with Michel Sardou
- 2004: Navarro, with Roger Hanin
- 2005: Mademoiselle Navarro
- 2005: La Légende vraie de la tour Eiffel, by Simon Brook
- 2005: Une famille pas comme les autres, with Line Renaud and Guy Bedos
- 2005: Mes deux maris, with Patrick Bosso
- 2005: SOS 18, by Didier Cohen and Alain Krief
- 2006: Hé M'sieur, with Jean-Marie Bigard
- 2006: Quai numéro un
- 2006: Chassé-croisé amoureux, with Ingrid Chauvin
- 2007: Adriana et moi, with Adriana Karembeu
- 2007: La Lance de la destinée, with Jacques Perrin and Jacques Weber
- 2008: La Main blanche, with Ingrid Chauvin and Bruno Madinier
- 2008: Un vrai Papa Noël, with Jean-Marie Bigard
- 2008: Oradour les voix intérieures, about the Oradour-sur-Glane massacre
- 2008: Dragon 17
- 2009-2012: Victoire Bonnot with Valérie Damidot.
- 2012: Chez Victoire with Valérie Damidot,
- 2013: La Disparue du Pyla with Véronique Genest.
- 2014: Terres de France
- 2014: Une chance de trop, adapted from Harlan Coben's novel No Second Chance.
- 2016: Juste un regard, adapted from Harlan Coben's novel Just One Look.
- 2018: La Faute, adapted from Paula Daly's book.

==== Screenwriter ====
- 1998: Louise et les Marchés, with Line Renaud;
- 2007: La Lance de la destinée, with Jacques Perrin et Jacques Weber.

=== Cinema ===
==== Producer ====
- 2003: Zéro défaut by Pierre Schoeller
- 2011: Je m'appelle Bernadette by Jean Sagols.

=== Theater ===
- 1976: Abahn Sabana David by Marguerite Duras, Biothéâtre,
- 1977: La Jeune Fille Violaine by Paul Claudel, at the Biothéâtre,
- 1978: L'Aigle à deux têtes by Jean Cocteau, Théâtre de l'Athénée,
- 1978-1979: La Tragique Histoire du Docteur Faust by Christopher Marlowe, at the Théâtre royal de Mons and Théâtre de Poche Bruxelles,
- 1979: La Cantate à trois voix by Paul Claudel, Théâtre Le Ranelagh,
- 1980: Il barbiere di Siviglia by Gioachino Rossini, Vaison-la-Romaine theater.
- 1981: La Célestine by Fernando de Rojas, Théâtre royal du Parc.

=== Book ===
- Économie de la communication TV et Radio, Presses universitaires de France, Que sais-je ? n. 2607, Paris, 1991, 128 p.
