= 1983 in French television =

This is a list of French television related events from 1983.

== Events ==
- 20 March – Guy Bonnet is selected to represent France at the 1983 Eurovision Song Contest with his song "Vivre". He is selected to be the twenty-sixth French Eurovision entry during a national final by Antenne 2.

== Debuts ==
- Yakari – 13 September

== Television shows ==
=== 1940s ===
- Le Jour du Seigneur (1949–present)

=== 1950s ===
- Présence protestante (1955–)

=== 1960s ===
- Les Dossiers de l'écran (1967–1991)
- Les Animaux du monde (1969–1990)
- Alain Decaux raconte (1969–1987)

=== 1970s ===
- 30 millions d'amis (1976–2016)
- Les Jeux de 20 Heures (1976–1987)

=== 1980s ===
- Dimanche Martin
- Julien Fontanes, magistrat (1980–1989)
- Mardi Cinéma (1982–1988)

== Ending this year ==
- Télé-Philatélie

La vérité est au fond de la marmite

== Deaths ==
- Denise Glaser

== See also ==
- 1983 in France
- List of French films of 1983
