= 1998 in French television =

This is a list of French television related events from 1998.

== Events ==
- 25 March – France Ô starts broadcasting.
- 12 July – France beat Brazil 3–0 to win the 1998 World Cup at Saint-Denis.

== Debuts ==
=== Domestic ===
- 14 September – Cap des Pins (1998–2000) (France 2)

=== International ===
- 1 April – (United States) / (Canada) Pocket Dragon Adventures (1998–1999) (France 3)

== Television shows ==
=== 1940s ===
- Le Jour du Seigneur (1949–present)

=== 1950s ===
- Présence protestante (1955–)

=== 1970s ===
- 30 millions d'amis (1976–2016)

=== 1990s ===
- Sous le soleil (1996–2008)

== Ending this year ==
- Dimanche Martin

== Networks and services ==
=== Launches ===
Network	Type	Launch date	Notes	Source
Canal+ Vert	Cable and satellite	Unknown		
Festival	Cable and satellite	Unknown		
M6 Music	Cable and satellite	5 March		
Mezzo	Cable television	21 March		
France O	Cable and satellite	25 March		
'Zik	Cable and satellite	25 April		
TFJ	Cable and satellite	14 May		
Infosport+	Cable television	10 July		
L'Équipe TV	Cable and satellite	31 August		
Planete+ Adventure	Cable television	2 September		
Game One	Cable and satellite	6 September		

=== Conversions and rebrandings ===
Old network name	New network name	Type	Conversion Date	Notes	Source
France Supervision	Mezzo TV	Cable and satellite	21 March		

== Deaths ==
- 19 April – Armand Jammot, television producer (b. 1922)

== See also ==
- 1998 in France
- List of French films of 1998
