= List of French films by year =

This is a list of films produced in the French cinema, ordered by year and decade of release on separate pages.

== Before 1910 ==
- List of French films before 1910

== 1910–1999 ==
- 1910
- 1911
- 1912
- 1913
- 1914
- 1915
- 1916
- 1917
- 1918
- 1919
- 1920
- 1921
- 1922
- 1923
- 1924
- 1925
- 1926
- 1927
- 1928
- 1929
- 1930
- 1931
- 1932
- 1933
- 1934
- 1935
- 1936
- 1937
- 1938
- 1939
- 1940
- 1941
- 1942
- 1943
- 1944
- 1945
- 1946
- 1947
- 1948
- 1949
- 1950
- 1951
- 1952
- 1953
- 1954
- 1955
- 1956
- 1957
- 1958
- 1959
- 1960
- 1961
- 1962
- 1963
- 1964
- 1965
- 1966
- 1967
- 1968
- 1969
- 1970
- 1971
- 1972
- 1973
- 1974
- 1975
- 1976
- 1977
- 1978
- 1979
- 1980
- 1981
- 1982
- 1983
- 1984
- 1985
- 1986
- 1987
- 1988
- 1989
- 1990
- 1991
- 1992
- 1993
- 1994
- 1995
- 1996
- 1997
- 1998
- 1999

== 21st century ==
- 2000
- 2001
- 2002
- 2003
- 2004
- 2005
- 2006
- 2007
- 2008
- 2009
- 2010
- 2011
- 2012
- 2013
- 2014
- 2015
- 2016
- 2017
- 2018
- 2019
- 2020
- 2021
- 2022
- 2023
- 2024
- 2025
- 2026
- 2027
- 2028
- 2029

== Alphabetical list ==
- See Category:French films

== See also ==
- Lists of films
- List of French erotic films
- List of French-language films
- List of years in France
- List of years in French television
- List of films set during the French Revolution and French Revolutionary Wars
