= 1985 in French television =

This is a list of French television related events from 1985.

== Events ==
- 31 March – Roger Bens is selected to represent France at the 1985 Eurovision Song Contest with his song "Femme dans ses rêves aussi". He is selected to be the twenty-eighth French Eurovision entry during a national final.
- December – A law is passed allowing the government to impose public service concessions and other constraints on private television companies.

== Television shows ==
=== 1940s ===
- Le Jour du Seigneur (1949–present)

=== 1950s ===
- Présence protestante (1955–)

=== 1960s ===
- Les Dossiers de l'écran (1967–1991)
- Les Animaux du monde (1969–1990)
- Alain Decaux raconte (1969–1987)

=== 1970s ===
- 30 millions d'amis (1976–2016)
- Les Jeux de 20 Heures (1976–1987)

=== 1980s ===
- Dimanche Martin
- Julien Fontanes, magistrat (1980–1989)
- Mardi Cinéma (1982–1988)

== Networks and services ==
=== Launches ===
Network	Type	Launch date	Notes	Source
Canal J	Cable and satellite	23 December		

== Births ==
- 26 July – Guillaume Pley, TV & radio presenter

== See also ==
- 1985 in France
- List of French films of 1985
