= 1999 in French television =

This is a list of French television related events from 1999.

== Events ==
- 2 March – Nayah is selected to represent France at the 1999 Eurovision Song Contest with her song "Je veux donner ma voix". She is selected to be the forty-second French Eurovision entry during a national final held at the Olympia in Paris.

== Debuts ==
- 11 October – Un gars, une fille (1999–2003) (France 2)
- Les Monos (1999–2004) (France 2)

=== International ===
- 20 December – (France) / (Canada) / (United Kingdom) Rayman: The Animated Series (1999–2000) (Gulli)
- (United Kingdom) Thomas the Tank Engine & Friends (1984–present) (Cartoon Network)

== Television shows ==
=== 1940s ===
- Le Jour du Seigneur (1949–present)

=== 1950s ===
- Présence protestante (1955–)

=== 1970s ===
- 30 millions d'amis (1976–2016)

=== 1990s ===
- Sous le soleil (1996–2008)
- Cap des Pins (1998–2000)

== Networks and services ==
=== Launches ===
Network	Type	Launch date	Notes	Source
OM TV	Cable and satellite	16 January		
RFM TV	Cable television	5 July		
Cartoon Network	Cable and satellite	23 August		
i>Télévision	Cable and satellite	4 November		
La Chaîne parlementaire	Cable and satellite	30 December		

=== Conversions and rebrandings ===
Old network name	New network name	Type	Conversion Date	Notes	Source
AB Animaux	Animaux	Cable and satellite	Unknown		
Automobile	AB Moteurs	Cable and satellite	Unknown		
AB Sports	Pathe Sport	Cable and satellite	April		

== Deaths ==
Date	Name	Age	Cinematic Credibility
27 December	Pierre Clémenti	57	French actor

== See also ==
- 1999 in France
