= 1969 in French television =

This is a list of French television related events from 1969.

== Events ==
- 29 March – France shares the win of the 14th Eurovision Song Contest, in a four-way tie with Spain, the United Kingdom and the Netherlands. Frida Boccara represents France, singing "Un jour, un enfant".

== Debuts ==
- 20 January – Les Animaux du monde (1969–1990)
- 10 July – Alain Decaux raconte (1969–1987)

== Television shows ==
=== 1940s ===
- Le Jour du Seigneur (1949–present)

=== 1950s ===
- Discorama
- Magazine féminin (1952–1970)
- La Piste aux étoiles (1956–1978)
- Présence protestante (1955–)

=== 1960s ===
- Dim Dam Dom (1965–1971)
- La Tête et les Jambes (1960–1978)
- La Caméra invisible (1964–1971)
- Les Coulisses de l'exploit (1961–1972)
- Les Dossiers de l'écran (1967–1991)
- Monsieur Cinéma (1967–1980)
- Colorix (1967–1973)
- Télé-Philatélie

== Ending this year ==
- Chambre noire
- Voyage sans passeport (1957–1969)

== Births ==
- 13 May – Nikos Aliagas, television presenter
- 26 September – Anthony Kavanagh, Haitian Canadian comedian, actor, singer & television personality
- 2 November – Claudy Siar, singer & TV & radio presenter

== See also ==
- 1969 in France
- List of French films of 1969
