= 2011 in French television =

This is a list of French television related events from 2011.

== Events ==
- 19 March – Singer Matt Pokora and his partner Katrina Patchett win the first series of Danse avec les stars.
- 28 June – Matthew Raymond-Barker wins the second and final series of X Factor.
- 14 October – Marie Garet wins the fifth series of Secret Story.
- 19 November – Singer Shy'm and her partner Maxime Dereymez win the second series of Danse avec les stars.
- 30 November – Analog television was switched off in all of France, including overseas territories.
- 14 December – 13-year-old singer Marina Dalmas wins the sixth series of La France a un incroyable talent

== Debuts ==
- 12 February – Danse avec les stars (2011–present)

== Television shows ==
=== 1940s ===
- Le Jour du Seigneur (1949–present)

=== 1950s ===
- Présence protestante (1955–present)

=== 1970s ===
- 30 millions d'amis (1976–2016)

=== 2000s ===
- Plus belle la vie (2004–2022)
- La France a un incroyable talent (2006–present)
- Secret Story (2007–2017, 2024-present)

== Ending this year ==
- X Factor (2009–2011)

== Networks and services ==
=== Launches ===
Network	Type	Launch date	Notes	Source
TVSud	Cable and satellite	7 February		
Trace Sport Stars	Cable television	June		
AlloCiné TV	Cable and satellite	5 September		
Trace Africa	Cable television	15 November		

=== Conversions and rebrandings ===
Old network name	New network name	Type	Conversion Date	Notes	Source
Playhouse Disney	Disney Junior	Cable and satellite	28 May		

=== Closures ===
Network	Type	End date	Notes	Sources
Antennes Locales	Cable and satellite	29 January		

== Deaths ==
- Évelyne Pagès

== See also ==
- 2011 in France
