= 2013 in French television =

This is a list of French television related events from 2013.

== Events ==
- 26 February – Sophie-Tith Charvet wins the ninth series of Nouvelle Star.
- 28 February – Laurène Bourvon wins the ninth and final series of Star Academy.
- 18 May – Yoann Fréget wins the second series of The Voice: la plus belle voix.
- 13 September – Anaïs Camizuli wins the seventh series of Secret Story.
- 23 November – Singer Alizée and her partner Grégoire Lyonnet win the fourth series of Danse avec les stars.
- 10 December – 23-year-old pole dancer Simon Heulle wins the eighth series of La France a un incroyable talent.

== Television shows ==
=== 1940s ===
- Le Jour du Seigneur (1949–present)

=== 1950s ===
- Présence protestante (1955–present)

=== 1970s ===
- 30 millions d'amis (1976–2016)

=== 2000s ===
- Nouvelle Star (2003–2010, 2012–2017)
- Plus belle la vie (2004–2022)
- La France a un incroyable talent (2006–present)
- SamSam (2007–2024)
- Secret Story (2007–2017, 2024-present)

=== 2010s ===
- Danse avec les stars (2011–present)
- The Voice: la plus belle voix (2012–present)

== Ending this year ==
- Star Academy (2001–2008, 2012–2013, 2022-present)

== Networks and services ==
=== Launches ===
Network	Type	Launch date	Notes	Source
Campagnes TV	Cable and satellite	15 January		
i24 News	Cable television	17 January		
Paramount Channel	Cable television	5 September		
Canal+ Series	Cable and satellite	21 September		
June	Cable and satellite	4 October		

=== Closures ===
Network	Type	End date	Notes	Sources
Foot School TV	Cable and satellite	Unknown		

== See also ==
- 2013 in France
