= 1980 in French television =

This is a list of French television related events from 1980.

== Events ==
- 23 March – Profil are selected to represent France at the 1980 Eurovision Song Contest with their song "Hé, hé M'sieurs dames". They are selected to be the twenty-fourth French Eurovision entry during a national final.

== Debuts ==
- 27 February – Julien Fontanes, magistrat (1980–1989)
- Dimanche Martin
- The Ghosts of Motley Hall

== Television shows ==
=== 1940s ===
- Le Jour du Seigneur (1949–present)

=== 1950s ===
- Présence protestante (1957–)

=== 1960s ===
- Les Dossiers de l'écran (1967–1991)
- Les Animaux du monde (1969–1990)
- Alain Decaux raconte (1969–1987)
- Télé-Philatélie

=== 1970s ===
- La vérité est au fond de la marmite
- Aujourd'hui Madame (1970–1982)
- 30 millions d'amis (1976–2016)
- Les Jeux de 20 Heures (1976–1987)
- 1, rue Sésame (1978–1982)

== Ending this year ==
- Monsieur Cinéma (1967–1980)

== Births ==
- 26 April – Laurent Ournac, actor & comedian
- 5 July – Lætitia Milot, actress & author
- 25 October – Laurie Cholewa, TV personality

== See also ==
- 1980 in France
- List of French films of 1980
