= 1982 in French television =

This is a list of French television related events from 1982.

== Debuts ==
- Mardi Cinéma

== Television shows ==
=== 1940s ===
- Le Jour du Seigneur (1949–present)

=== 1950s ===
- Présence protestante (1955–)

=== 1960s ===
- Les Dossiers de l'écran (1967–1991)
- Les Animaux du monde (1969–1990)
- Alain Decaux raconte (1969–1987)

=== 1970s ===
- 30 millions d'amis (1976–2016)
- Les Jeux de 20 Heures (1976–1987)

=== 1980s ===
- Dimanche Martin
- Julien Fontanes, magistrat (1980–1989)

== Ending this year ==
- Aujourd'hui Madame (1970–1982)
- 1, rue Sésame (1978–1982)

== Births ==
- 3 February – Laurent Maistret, model & television presenter
- 25 April – Karine Ferri, TV personality & model

== Deaths ==
Date	Name	Age	Cinematic Credibility
23 February	Robert Beauvais	70	French writer & journalist

== See also ==
- 1982 in France
- List of French films of 1982
