= 1967 in French television =

This is a list of French television related events from 1967.

== Debuts ==
- 6 April – Les Dossiers de l'écran (1967–1991)
- 18 September – Monsieur Cinéma (1967–1980)
- 20 September – Lagardère (1967)
- 2 October – Colorix (1967–1973)

== Television shows ==
=== 1940s ===
- Le Jour du Seigneur (1949–present)

=== 1950s ===
- Cinq colonnes à la une
- Discorama
- Magazine féminin (1952–1970)
- Lectures pour tous (1953–1968)
- La Piste aux étoiles (1956–1978)
- Présence protestante (1955–)

=== 1960s ===
- Chambre noire
- Dim Dam Dom (1965–1971)
- La Caméra invisible (1964–1971)
- La Tête et les Jambes (1960–1978)
- Les Coulisses de l'exploit (1961–1972)
- Télé-Philatélie
- Voyage sans passeport (1957–1969)

== Births ==
- 25 January – David Ginola, actor, TV presenter & former international footballer
- 18 March – Olivier Minne, Belgian-born producer, actor & TV presenter

== See also ==
- 1967 in France
- List of French films of 1967
