= 2007 in French television =

This is a list of French television related events from 2007.

== Events ==
- 6 March – Les Fatals Picards are selected to represent France at the 2007 Eurovision Song Contest with their song "L'amour à la française". They are selected to be the fiftieth French Eurovision entry during a national final held at the La Plaine-St-Denis Studios in Paris.
- 13 June – Julien Doré wins the fifth series of Nouvelle Star.
- 23 June – The television reality show Secret Story debuts on TF1. This carries on from the previous similar show, Loft Story.
- 31 August – The first series of Secret Story is won by 23-year-old triplets Marjorie, Cyrielle and Johanna Bluteau.
- 11 December – 27-year-old breakdancer Junior wins the second series of Incroyable Talent.

== Debuts ==
- 23 June – Secret Story (2007–2017, 2024-present)
- 24 November Sushi Pack (French Dub)

== Television shows ==
=== 1940s ===
- Le Jour du Seigneur (1949–present)

=== 1950s ===
- Présence protestante (1955–present)

=== 1970s ===
- 30 millions d'amis (1976–2016)

=== 1990s ===
- Sous le soleil (1996–2008)

=== 2000s ===
- Star Academy (2001–2008, 2012–2013, 2022-present)
- Nouvelle Star (2003–2010, 2012–2017)
- Plus belle la vie (2004–2022)
- Incroyable Talent (2006–present)

== Ending this year ==
- 5, Rue Sésame (2005–2007)

== Networks and services ==
=== Launches ===
Network	Type	Launch date	Notes	Source
Gong	Cable television	Unknown		
Canal+ Kids	Cable and satellite	1 January		
NRJ Hits	Cable television	23 March		
Planete+ Crime	Cable television	27 March		
Nolife	Cable and satellite	1 June		
CGTN French	Cable television	1 October		
Fit TV	Cable and satellite	15 October		
Canal+ Family	Cable and satellite	20 October		
MTV Base	Cable and satellite	21 December		
Cine First	Cable and satellite	31 December		
Vivolta	Cable and satellite	31 December		

=== Conversions and rebrandings ===
Old network name	New network name	Type	Conversion Date	Notes	Source
i-MCM	Virgin 17	Cable and satellite	Unknown		
Toon Disney	Disney Cinemagic	Cable and satellite	4 September		

=== Closures ===
Network	Type	End date	Notes	Sources
Cine Pop	Cable and satellite	21 June		
Musique classique	Cable and satellite	15 October		
TPS Foot	Cable and satellite	31 December		

== Deaths ==
- Jacques Martin

== See also ==
- 2007 in France
