= 1986 in French television =

This is a list of French television related events from 1986.

== Events ==
- 22 March – Cocktail Chic are selected to represent France at the 1986 Eurovision Song Contest with their song "Européennes". They are selected to be the twenty-ninth French Eurovision entry during a national final.

== Television shows ==
=== 1940s ===
- Le Jour du Seigneur (1949–present)

=== 1950s ===
- Présence protestante (1955–)

=== 1960s ===
- Les Dossiers de l'écran (1967–1991)
- Les Animaux du monde (1969–1990)
- Alain Decaux raconte (1969–1987)

=== 1970s ===
- 30 millions d'amis (1976–2016)
- Les Jeux de 20 Heures (1976–1987)

=== 1980s ===
- Julien Fontanes, magistrat (1980–1989)
- Mardi Cinéma (1982–1988)

== Networks and services ==
=== Launches ===
Network	Type	Launch date	Notes	Source
La Cinq	Cable and satellite	28 February		
TV6 France	Cable and satellite	1 March		
Paris Premiere	Cable television	15 December		

=== Conversions and rebrandings ===
Old network name	New network name	Type	Conversion Date	Notes	Source
[[]]		Cable and satellite	Unknown		

=== Closures ===
Network	Type	End date	Notes	Sources
[[]]	Cable and satellite			

== See also ==
- 1986 in France
- List of French films of 1986
