= 1970 in French television =

This is a list of French television related events from 1970.

== Events ==
- 21 February – Guy Bonnet is selected to represent France at the 1970 Eurovision Song Contest with his song "Marie-Blanche". He is selected to be the fifteenth French Eurovision entry during a national final.

== Debuts ==
- 19 May – Aujourd'hui Madame (1970–1982)

== Television shows ==
=== 1940s ===
- Le Jour du Seigneur (1949–present)

=== 1950s ===
- Discorama
- La Piste aux étoiles (1956–1978)
- Présence protestante (1955–)

=== 1960s ===
- Dim Dam Dom (1965–1971)
- La Tête et les Jambes (1960–1978)
- La Caméra invisible (1964–1971)
- Les Coulisses de l'exploit (1961–1972)
- Les Dossiers de l'écran (1967–1991)
- Monsieur Cinéma (1967–1980)
- Colorix (1967–1973)
- Les Animaux du monde (1969–1990)
- Alain Decaux raconte (1969–1987)
- Télé-Philatélie

== Ending this year ==
- Magazine féminin (1952–1970)

== Births ==
- 28 March – Benjamin Castaldi, television personality
- 30 December – Sandrine Quétier, television presenter

== See also ==
- 1970 in France
- List of French films of 1970
