= 2003 in French television =

This is a list of French television related events from 2003.

== Events ==
- 27 March – The French version of Pop Idol debuts on M6.
- 10 July – Jonatan Cerrada wins the first series of À la Recherche de la Nouvelle Star.
- 20 December – Élodie Frégé wins the third series of Star Academy.

== Debuts ==
- 27 March – Nouvelle Star (2003–2010, 2012–2017)
- 3 September – Code Lyoko (2003–2007)

== Television shows ==
=== 1940s ===
- Le Jour du Seigneur (1949–present)

=== 1950s ===
- Présence protestante (1955–)

=== 1970s ===
- 30 millions d'amis (1976–2016)

=== 1990s ===
- Sous le soleil (1996–2008)

=== 2000s ===
- Star Academy (2001–2008, 2012–2013, 2022-present)

== Networks and services ==
=== Launches ===
Network	Type	Launch date	Notes	Source
Beur TV	Cable and satellite	3 March		
Boomerang	Cable and satellite	23 April		
TFOU TV	Cable and satellite	23 April		
Trace TV	Cable television	27 April		
TV7 Bordeaux	Cable and satellite	June		
MCM Top	Cable and satellite	28 November		
Piwi+	Cable television	9 December		

=== Conversions and rebrandings ===
Old network name	New network name	Type	Conversion Date	Notes	Source
Canal+ Jaune	Canal+ Cinéma(s)	Cable and satellite	Unknown		
Canal+ Vert	Canal+ Sport	Cable and satellite	1 November		
TMC	TMC Monte-Carlo	Cable and satellite	Unknown		

== Deaths ==
- 13 June – Guy Lux, game show host and producer (born 1919).

== See also ==
- 2003 in France
