= 1987 in French television =

This is a list of French television related events from 1987.

== Events ==
- 4 April – Christine Minier is selected to represent France at the 1987 Eurovision Song Contest with her song "Les mots d'amour n'ont pas de dimanche". She is selected to be the thirtieth French Eurovision entry during a national final.

== Debuts ==
=== Domestic ===
- 12 September – La Une est à vous (1973–1976, 1987–1994)

=== International ===
- 4 May – (United States) Kate & Allie (1984–1989) (Antenne 2)

== Television shows ==
=== 1940s ===
- Le Jour du Seigneur (1949–present)

=== 1950s ===
- Présence protestante (1955–)

=== 1960s ===
- Les Dossiers de l'écran (1967–1991)
- Les Animaux du monde (1969–1990)

=== 1970s ===
- 30 millions d'amis (1976–2016)

=== 1980s ===
- Dimanche Martin
- Julien Fontanes, magistrat (1980–1989)
- Mardi Cinéma (1982–1988)
- Questions à domicile (1985–1989)

== Ending this year ==
- Alain Decaux raconte (1969–1987)
- Les Jeux de 20 Heures (1976–1987)

=== Conversions and rebrandings ===
Old network name	New network name	Type	Conversion Date	Notes	Source
TV6 France	M6	Cable and satellite	28 February		

== Births ==
- 10 November – Caroline Receveur, TV & web personality

== See also ==
- 1987 in France
- List of French films of 1987
