= 1973 in French television =

This is a list of French television related events from 1973.

== Events ==
- 6 March – Martine Clemenceau is selected to represent France at the 1973 Eurovision Song Contest with her song "Sans toi". She is selected to be the eighteenth French Eurovision entry during a national final held at the Buttes-Chaumont Studios in Paris.

== Debuts ==
- 15 September – La Une est à vous (1973–1976, 1987–1994)

== Television shows ==
=== 1940s ===
- Le Jour du Seigneur (1949–present)

=== 1950s ===
- Discorama
- La Piste aux étoiles (1956–1978)
- Présence protestante (1955–)

=== 1960s ===
- La Tête et les Jambes (1960–1978)
- Les Coulisses de l'exploit (1961–1972)
- Les Dossiers de l'écran (1967–1991)
- Monsieur Cinéma (1967–1980)
- Les Animaux du monde (1969–1990)
- Alain Decaux raconte (1969–1987)
- Télé-Philatélie

=== 1970s ===
- Aujourd'hui Madame (1970–1982)

== Ending this year ==
- Colorix (1967–1973)
- Bonne nuit les petits13 December 1973

== See also ==
- 1973 in France
- List of French films of 1973
