= 2001 in French television =

This is a list of French television related events from 2001.

== Events ==
- 26 April – The television reality show Loft Story debuts on M6.
- 5 July – The first series of Loft Story is won by Christophe Mercy and Loana Petrucciani.
- 3 September – David Pujadas debuts as the anchorman of France 2's 8pm newscast.
- 11 September – TF1 interrupts the American made-for-television movie Another Woman's Husband for a thirty-minute simulcast with its news channel LCI, about a terrorist attack on the United States and the collapse of the Twin Towers in New York City. The channel then starts its own news coverage with successively Patrick Poivre d'Arvor, Jean-Pierre Pernaut, Claire Chazal and Jean-Claude Narcy who takes turns to anchor the this coverage, which airs until 0:05am UTC, when TF1 airs the unscheduled Perry Mason made-for-television movie The Case of the Heartbroken Bride. France 2 starts their news special at 3:33pm UTC, after the German series Die Kommissarin, with David Pujadas and Daniel Bilalian taking their turn as presenters. France 2 tries to return to normal programming at 11:08pm UTC, with the 2000 German television movie www.madechenkiller.de - Todesfalle Internet, but the channel then returns to the newsroom at 0:14am UTC, with the film returning to the air at 1:26am UTC. France 3 interrupts the 1988 American television movie Promised a Miracle at 3:49pm UTC, with Élise Lucet announcing the news. Promised a Miracle then resumes at 4:03pm UTC, with France 3 returning to the newsroom at 4:46pm UTC, with Lucet alternating with Marc Autheman.The public channel's coverage ends at 10:35pm UTC, when they air the film One Deadly Summer. Canal+ continues with normal programming until 6:29pm UTC, when the channel simulcasts i>Télévision's news coverage until 8:33pm UTC, when it airs coverage of the 2001–02 UEFA Champions League first group stage. It is presented by Bruce Toussaint, Marie Drucker and Charlotte Le Grix de la Salle. M6 first only makes newsflashes between some of normal programming, with its first news report being shown after the American series Early Edition, before proposing a special edition of the 6 Minutes newscast, followed by a special programme at 9:02pm UTC, presented by Bernard de La Villardière and Laurent Delahousse. It was followed by a delayed showing of the 1998 American made-for-television movie Outrage at 0.11am UTC. During nighttime programming, the channel simulcasts CNN's news coverage. Among the programmes to be pulled from the day's schedule are Passions, Beverly Hills, 90210, Exclusif, Le Bigdil, and The Fugitive on TF1, Diagnosis: Murder, Des chiffres et des lettres, Qui est qui ?, Le Groupe Heartbreak High, On a tout essayé, Un gars, une fille, City of Angels and Paths of Glory on France 2, the afternoon showing of MNK, À toi l'actu@ !, C'est pas sorcier, Un livre, un jour, Questions pour un champion, Tout le sport and coverage of the International Circus Festival of Monte-Carlo on France 3, The Simpsons, + de cinéma, Le Zapping and Les Guignols de l'info on Canal +, and Caméra café on M6.

== Debuts ==
- 26 April – Loft Story (2001–2002)
- 20 October – Star Academy (2001–2008, 2012–2013, 2022-present)

=== International ===
- (United States) CSI: Crime Scene Investigation (Unknown)

== Television shows ==
=== 1940s ===
- Le Jour du Seigneur (1949–present)

=== 1950s ===
- Présence protestante (1955–)

=== 1970s ===
- 30 millions d'amis (1976–2016)

=== 1990s ===
- Sous le soleil (1996–2008)

== Networks and services ==
=== Launches ===
Network	Type	Launch date	Notes	Source
MCM 2	Cable and satellite	3 April		
TPS Star	Cable and satellite	19 September		
TV7 Bordeaux	Cable and satellite	June		
National Geographic	Cable and satellite	22 September		
Canal 32	Cable and satellite	23 November		
Melody	Cable television	3 December		

=== Conversions and rebrandings ===
Old network name	New network name	Type	Conversion Date	Notes	Source
Monte Carlo TMC	TMC	Cable and satellite	Unknown		

== Deaths ==
- Igor Barrère – (17 December 1931 – 24 June 2001)

== See also ==
- 2001 in France
