= 2000 in French television =

This is a list of French television related events from 2000.

== Events ==
- 15 February – Sofia Mestari is selected to represent France at the 2000 Eurovision Song Contest with her song "On aura le ciel". She is selected to be the forty-third French Eurovision entry during a national final held at the Olympia in Paris.

== Debuts ==
=== International ===
- (United States) Law & Order: Special Victims Unit (Unknown)

== Television shows ==
=== 1940s ===
- Le Jour du Seigneur (1949–present)

=== 1950s ===
- Présence protestante (1955–)

=== 1970s ===
- 30 millions d'amis (1976–2016)

=== 1990s ===
- Sous le soleil (1996–2008)

== Ending this year ==
- Cap des Pins (1998–2000)

== Networks and services ==
=== Launches ===
Network	Type	Launch date	Notes	Source
BRTV	Cable and satellite	January		
Public Senat	Cable television	25 April		
MTV	Cable and satellite	20 June		
TV Breizh	Cable and satellite	1 September		
TiJi	Cable and satellite	15 December		
TF6	Cable and satellite	18 December		

== Deaths ==
Date	Name	Age	Cinematic Credibility
26 August	Odette Joyeux	85	French actress & writer

== See also ==
- 2000 in France
