= 2016 in French television =

This is a list of French television related events from 2016.

== Events ==
- 3 May – Patrick Rouiller wins the twelfth series of Nouvelle Star.
- 14 May – Slimane Nebchi wins the fifth series of The Voice: la plus belle voix.
- 1 September – The television version of franceinfo: launches.

== Television shows ==
=== 1940s ===
- Le Jour du Seigneur (1949–present)

=== 1950s ===
- Présence protestante (1955–present)

=== 2000s ===
- Nouvelle Star (2003–2010, 2012–2017)
- Plus belle la vie (2004–2022)
- La France a un incroyable talent (2006–present)
- Secret Story (2007–2017, 2024-present)

=== 2010s ===
- Danse avec les stars (2011–present)
- The Voice: la plus belle voix (2012–present)

== Ending this year ==
- 30 millions d'amis (1976–2016)

== Networks and services ==
=== Launches ===
Network	Type	Launch date	Notes	Source
Crime District	Cable and satellite	11 February		
Toonami	Cable television	11 February		
Ultra Nature	Cable and satellite	19 May		
RMC Sport	Cable television	7 June		
France Info	Cable and satellite	1 September		

=== Conversions and rebrandings ===
Old network name	New network name	Type	Conversion Date	Notes	Source
D8	C8	Cable and satellite	5 September		
D17	CStar	Cable and satellite	5 September		

=== Closures ===
Network	Type	End date	Notes	Sources
June	Cable and satellite	1 September		

== See also ==
- 2016 in France
