= 2005 in French television =

This is a list of French television related events from 2005.

== Events ==
- 15 March – Ortal is selected to represent France at the 2005 Eurovision Song Contest with her song "Chacun pense à soi". She is selected to be the forty-eighth French Eurovision entry during a national final held at the La Plaine-St-Denis Studios in Paris.
- 31 March – France 4 starts broadcasting.
- 12 May – Myriam Abel wins the third series of Nouvelle Star, becoming the show's first female winner.
- 16 December – Magalie Vaé wins the fifth series of Star Academy.

== Debuts ==
- 22 October – 5, Rue Sésame (2005–2007)
- 24 December- Yakari

== Television shows ==
=== 1940s ===
- Le Jour du Seigneur (1949–present)

=== 1950s ===
- Présence protestante (1955–present)

=== 1970s ===
- 30 millions d'amis (1976–2016)

=== 1990s ===
- Sous le soleil (1996–2008)

=== 2000s ===
- Star Academy (2001–2008, 2012–2013, 2022-present)
- Nouvelle Star (2003–2010, 2012–2017)
- Plus belle la vie (2004–2022)

== Networks and services ==
=== Launches ===
Network	Type	Launch date	Notes	Source
Sailing Channel	Cable and satellite	Unknown		
Europe 2 TV	Cable and satellite	17 October		
Eurosport 2	Cable and satellite	10 January		
M6 Music Black	Cable and satellite	10 January		
Ushuaïa TV	Cable and satellite	14 March		
Direct 8	Cable and satellite	31 March		
France 4	Cable television	31 March		
NRJ 12	Cable and satellite	31 March		
NT1	Cable and satellite	31 March		
W9	Cable television	31 March		
OL Play	Cable television	27 July		
TPS Foot	Cable and satellite	13 August		
Discovery Real Time	Cable and satellite	1 October		
Nickelodeon	Cable and satellite	16 November		
Gulli	Cable and satellite	18 November		
BFM TV	Cable and satellite	28 November		
MTV Idol	Cable and satellite	17 November		
MTV Pulse	Cable and satellite	30 November		
Syfy	Cable and satellite	2 December		

=== Conversions and rebrandings ===
Old network name	New network name	Type	Conversion Date	Notes	Source
i-MCM	Europe 2 TV	Cable and satellite	17 October		
Canal+ Confort	Canal+ Décalé	Cable and satellite	5 March		
Festival	France 4	Cable and satellite	31 March		

=== Closures ===
Network	Type	End date	Notes	Sources
RFM TV	Cable television	31 March		

== Deaths ==
Date	Name	Age	Cinematic Credibility
8 January	Jacqueline Joubert	83	French continuity announcer, producer & director

== See also ==
- 2005 in France
