= 2002 in French television =

This is a list of French television related events from 2002.

== Events ==
- 12 January – Jenifer Bartoli wins the first series of Star Academy.
- 4 July – Karine Delgado and Thomas Saillofest win the second and final series of Loft Story.
- 21 December – Nolwenn Leroy wins the second series of Star Academy.

== Television shows ==
=== 1940s ===
- Le Jour du Seigneur (1949–present)

=== 1950s ===
- Présence protestante (1955–)

=== 1970s ===
- 30 millions d'amis (1976–2016)

=== 1990s ===
- Sous le soleil (1996–2008)

=== 2000s ===
- Star Academy (2001–2008, 2012–2013, 2022-present)

== Ending this year ==
- Les Minikeums (1993–2002)
- Loft Story (2001–2002)

== Networks and services ==
=== Launches ===
Network	Type	Launch date	Notes	Source
Antennes Locales	Cable and satellite	July		
Ciné Box	Cable and satellite	September		
Teletoon +2	Cable television	2 September		
Ciné FX	Cable and satellite	15 September		

=== Conversions and rebrandings ===
Old network name	New network name	Type	Conversion Date	Notes	Source
i>Télévision	i>Télé	Cable and satellite	Unknown		
Pathe Sport	Sport+	Cable and satellite	25 October		

=== Closures ===
Network	Type	End date	Notes	Sources
Ciné Palace	Cable and satellite	September		

== Births ==
- Céleste Brunnquell

== Deaths ==
Date	Name	Age	Cinematic Credibility
6 December	Marcel Cravenne	94	French director

- Jacques Rouland

== See also ==
- 2002 in France
