= 2008 in French television =

This is a list of French television related events from 2008.

== Events ==
- 15 February – Quentin Mosimann wins the seventh series of Star Academy.
- 11 June – Amandine Bourgeois wins the sixth series of Nouvelle Star.
- 5 September – Matthias Pohl wins the second series of Secret Story.
- 13 November – 23-year-old fire artist Alexandre wins the third series of Incroyable Talent.
- 19 December – Mickels Réa wins the eighth series of Star Academy.

== Television shows ==
=== 1940s ===
- Le Jour du Seigneur (1949–present)

=== 1950s ===
- Présence protestante (1955–)

=== 1970s ===
- 30 millions d'amis (1976–2016)

=== 2000s ===
- Nouvelle Star (2003–2010, 2012–2017)
- Plus belle la vie (2004–2022)
- Incroyable Talent (2006–present)
- Secret Story (2007–2017, 2024-present)

== Ending this year ==
- Sous le soleil (1996–2008)
- Star Academy (2001–2008, 2012–2013, 2022-present)

== Networks and services ==
=== Launches ===
Network	Type	Launch date	Notes	Source
Virgin 17	Cable and satellite	Unknown		
my Zen TV	Cable television	23 January		
Cap 24	Cable and satellite	20 March		
IDF1	Cable and satellite	20 March		
National Geographic Wild	Cable television	9 September		
OCS	Cable and satellite	13 November		
Berber Music	Cable and satellite	25 November		
Berber Youth	Cable and satellite	25 November		

=== Conversions and rebrandings ===
Old network name	New network name	Type	Conversion Date	Notes	Source
TFOU TV	Foot School TV	Cable and satellite	28 February		

== See also ==
- 2008 in France
