= 2004 in French television =

This is a list of French television related events from 2004.

== Events ==
- 13 May – Steeve Estatof wins the second series of Nouvelle Star.
- 7 October – Documentary The Staircase (Soupçons) is premiered in miniseries format on Canal+.
- 22 December – Grégory Lemarchal wins the fourth series of Star Academy, becoming the show's first man to be crowned as winner.

== Debuts ==
- 6 August – Atomic Betty
- 30 August – Plus belle la vie (2004–present)
- Eurasia : À la conquête de l'Orient (2004–2004)

== Television shows ==
=== 1940s ===
- Le Jour du Seigneur (1949–present)

=== 1950s ===
- Présence protestante (1955–)

=== 1970s ===
- 30 millions d'amis (1976–2016)

=== 1990s ===
- Sous le soleil (1996–2008)

=== 2000s ===
- Star Academy (2001–2008, 2012–2013, 2022-present)
- Nouvelle Star (2003–2010, 2012–2017)

== Networks and services ==
=== Launches ===
Network	Type	Launch date	Notes	Source
Discovery Channel	Cable and satellite	1 August		
Filles TV	Cable and satellite	1 September		
Pink TV	Cable and satellite	25 October		

=== Closures ===
Network	Type	End date	Notes	Sources
Cine Box	Cable and satellite	24 August		

== See also ==
- 2004 in France
