= 2006 in French television =

This is a list of French television related events from 2006.

== Events ==
- 8 June – Christophe Willem wins the fourth series of Nouvelle Star.
- 7 December – 27-year-old popper/b-boy Salah Benlemqawanssa wins the first series of Incroyable Talent.
- 22 December – Cyril Cinélu wins the sixth series of Star Academy.

== Debuts ==
- 6 November – Incroyable Talent (2006–present)

== Television shows ==
=== 1940s ===
- Le Jour du Seigneur (1949–present)

=== 1950s ===
- Présence protestante (1955–present)

=== 1970s ===
- 30 millions d'amis (1976–2016)

=== 1990s ===
- Sous le soleil (1996–2008)

=== 2000s ===
- Star Academy (2001–2008, 2012–2013, 2022-present)
- Nouvelle Star (2003–2010, 2012–2017)
- Plus belle la vie (2004–2022)
- 5, Rue Sésame (2005–2007)

== Networks and services ==
=== Launches ===
Network	Type	Launch date	Notes	Source
Stingray iConcerts	Cable television	Unknown		
Luxe.tv	Cable television	23 June		
Memories from Earth	Cable television	Unknown		
France 24	Cable television	Unknown		

== See also ==
- 2006 in France
