= 1981 in French television =

This is a list of French television related events from 1981.

== Events ==
- 8 March – Jean Gabilou is selected to represent France at the 1981 Eurovision Song Contest with his song "Humanahum". He is selected to be the twenty-fifth French Eurovision entry during a national final.

== Television shows ==
=== 1940s ===
- Le Jour du Seigneur (1949–present)

=== 1960s ===
- Les Dossiers de l'écran (1967–1991)
- Les Animaux du monde (1969–1990)
- Alain Decaux raconte (1969–1987)

=== 1970s ===
- Aujourd'hui Madame (1970–1982)
- 30 millions d'amis (1976–2016)
- Les Jeux de 20 Heures (1976–1987)
- 1, rue Sésame (1978–1982)

=== 1980s ===
- Julien Fontanes, magistrat (1980–1989)
- Dimanche Martin

== Births ==
- 10 February – Natasha St-Pier, Canadian-born singer & TV personality
- 16 March – Vincent Cerutti, TV & radio presenter
- 22 April – Virginie de Clausade, actress & TV & radio presenter

== Deaths ==
- 10 November – Abel Gance, film director, producer, writer, actor and editor (born 1889).

== See also ==
- 1981 in France
- List of French films of 1981
