= Shirley Bousquet =

French actress

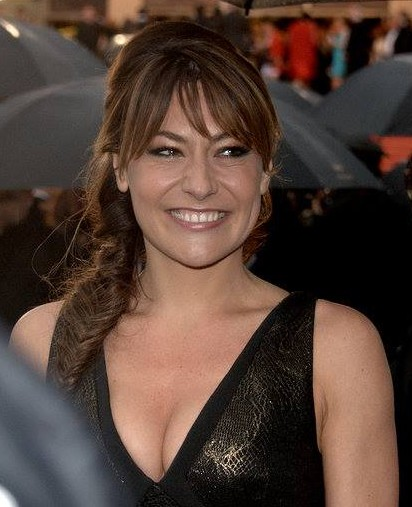
- Shirley Bousquet in 2013
- Born: 5 March 1976 (age 50); France
- Occupation: Actress
- Years active: 1996–present

Shirley Bousquet (born 5 March 1976) is a French actress.

== Life and career ==
From 1998 to 2004, Shirley Bousquet played the recurring role of Jeanne Bouvier in the television series Sous le soleil. In 2001, she was revealed to the public on television with her character Nancy Langeais in the series Camera Café. In 2005, she takes the character of Nancy in the film adaptation of the series Camera Café, in Espace détente.

In 2012, she plays in "L'amour c'est mieux à deux" of Dominique Farrugia and Arnaud Lemort where she is the enterprising and offbeat secretary of Clovis Cornillac. In 2012, she plays in "Plan de table" of Christelle Raynal where she plays the role of Edith, one of the main characters of the film.

In 2015, she is the mistress of ceremony at the opening of the 17th edition of the La Rochelle Festival

In 2016, she participated in the spot "Safety for all" by Frédéric Chau. This video shows personalities, like Josiane Balasko, Édouard Montoute, Michel Boujenah, and anonymous people from all backgrounds expressing their turn face camera by proclaiming strong sentences like "Prejudices kill", "Silence, we kill" or "Where is the freedom if going out kills us?". The same year, she participated with several artists in the clip "Seul Ensemble" for the benefit of the parents' home of the Margency pediatric hospital.

== Filmography ==
=== Feature films ===
Year	Title	Role	Director	Notes
1999	Les Migrations de Vladimir	Fleurist	Mika Assaf	
2000	Taxi 2	The Woman of the pool	Gérard Krawczyk	
2001	Gamer	The Journalist	Patrick Levy	
2002	Gangsters	Judith	Olivier Marchal	
2005	Espace Détente	Nancy	Bruno Solo & Yvan Le Bolloc'h	
2006	Incontrôlable	Catherine	Raffy Shart	
2006	Hell	Tatyanna	Bruno Chiche	
2007	Our Earthmen Friends	The Photographer	Bernard Werber	
2008	Lady Blood	Véronique	Jean-Marc Vincent	
2009	Neuilly Yo Mama!	The Airport employee	Gabriel Julien-Laferrière	
2010	Les Princes de la nuit	Anabel	Patrick Levy	
2010	L'amour c'est mieux à deux	Swan	Dominique Farrugia & Arnaud Lemort	
2011	Omar Killed Me	Joséphine	Roschdy Zem	
2011	You Will Be My Son	Jessica	Gilles Legrand	
2011	Bienvenue à bord	The Player's wife at the casino	Éric Lavaine	
2012	Plan de table	Edith	Christelle Raynal	
2013	Paris à tout prix	Emma	Reem Kherici	
2017	Jour J	Juliet's teacher	Reem Kherici	
2017	À deux heures de Paris	Jeanne	Virginie Verrier	

=== Television ===
Year	Title	Role	Director	Notes
1996-1998	Les Années fac	Laetitia / Marie-Hélène	Jean-François Porry	TV series
1997	Les vacances de l'amour	Patricia		TV series - Season 2 Episode 18
2000-2004	Sous le soleil	Jeanne Bouvier	Olivier Brémond & Pascal Breton	TV series - Seasons 5 to 9
2001-2002	Avocats et Associés	The Assistant photographer	Valérie Guignabodet & Alain Krief	TV series - Episodes "La Grande Muette" & "Partie civile"
2002-2004	Caméra Café	Nancy		TV series
2003	Julie Lescaut	Hélène	Klaus Biedermann	TV series - Season 12 Episode 1
2004	Joe Pollox et les mauvais esprits	The Brunette	Jérôme Foulon	TV movie
2004	SOS 18		Didier Cohen & Alain Krief	TV series - Episode "Tête à l'envers"
2004	Fargas	Valérie	Charlotte Brandström	TV series - Episode "Pour solde de tout compte"
2005	Blandine l'insoumise	Angélique		TV series - Season 1 Episode 8
2005	Louis la Brocante	Martine		TV series - Season 7 Episode 2
2006	Mademoiselle Gigi	Lola Courcelles	Caroline Huppert	TV movie
2006	Profils criminels	Emma Sinclair	Laurent Carcélès	TV movie
2008	Roue de secours	Céline	Williams Crépin	TV movie
2009	Les Amants de l'ombre	Nicole	Philippe Niang	TV movie
2009	Mes amis, mes amours, mes emmerdes...	Sonia		TV series - Season 1 episodes 1, 2 & 3
2009	Nous ne sommes pas des saints	Eve	Nicolas Ragni	TV series - Season 1
2010-2012	Victoire Bonnot	Valéria	Jean-Pierre Dusséaux	TV series
2013	Paradis amers	Aline	Christian Faure	TV movie
2013	Vaugand	Audrey Varennes	Charlotte Brandström	TV series - Season 1 Episode 1
