= 2010 in French television =

This is a list of French television related events from 2010.

== Events ==
- 16 June – Luce Brunet wins the eighth series of Nouvelle Star. This was the final series to be broadcast on M6.
- 22 October – Benoit Dubois wins the fourth series of Secret Story.
- 22 December – 8-year-old dance couple Alex and Alizée win the fifth series of La France a un incroyable talent.

== Television shows ==
=== 1940s ===
- Le Jour du Seigneur (1949–present)

=== 1950s ===
- Présence protestante (1955–present)

=== 1970s ===
- 30 millions d'amis (1976–2016)

=== 2000s ===
- Plus belle la vie (2004–2022)
- La France a un incroyable talent (2006–present)
- Secret Story (2007–2017, 2024-present)
- X Factor (2009–2011)

== Ending this year ==
- Nouvelle Star (2003–2010, 2012–2017)

== Networks and services ==
=== Launches ===
| Network | Type | Launch date | Notes | Source |
|---|---|---|---|---|
| Nickelodeon Junior | Cable television | 26 January | | |
| Nickelodeon Teen | Cable television | 26 January | | |
| Mezzo Live | Cable and satellite | 7 April | | |
| Boing | Cable and satellite | 8 April | | |
| Médias du Sud | Cable and satellite | 25 June | | |
| Direct Star | Cable and satellite | 1 September | | |
| Lucky Jack.tv | Cable and satellite | 26 September | | |
| Golf Channel France | Cable and satellite | 28 September | | |
| BFM Business Parts | Cable and satellite | 22 November | | |
| Museum TV | Cable and satellite | December | | |

=== Conversions and rebrandings ===
| Old network name | New network name | Type | Conversion Date | Notes | Source |
|---|---|---|---|---|---|
| 13eme Rue | 13eme Rue HD Universal | Cable and satellite | Unknown | | |
| Virgin 17 | Direct Star | Cable and satellite | Unknown | | |
| Trace TV | Trace Urban | Cable television | Unknown | | |

=== Closures ===
| Network | Type | End date | Notes | Sources |
|---|---|---|---|---|
| Discovery Real Time | Cable and satellite | 26 January | | |
| Virgin 17 | Cable and satellite | 1 September | | |
| Cine First | Cable and satellite | 30 September | | |
| Cap 24 | Cable and satellite | 12 October | | |

== See also ==
- 2010 in France
