= 1998 in France =

- Decades: 1970s; 1980s; 1990s; 2000s; 2010s
- See also: History of France; Timeline of French history; List of years in France

Events from the year 1998 in France.

== Incumbents ==
- President: Jacques Chirac
- Prime Minister: Lionel Jospin

== Events ==
- 6 February – The French prefect Claude Erignac is assassinated in the streets of Ajaccio, Corsica.
- 15 March – Cantonales Elections held.
- 15 March – Regional Elections held.
- 22 March – Cantonales Elections held.
- April – The Renault Laguna is restyled more than four years after its launch. An all-new model is due in the year 2000.
- 11 May – The first euro coins are minted in Pessac, France. Because the final specifications for the coins were not finished in 1998, they will have to be melted and minted again in 1999.
- 12 June – The Football World Cup commences in France. The host nation defeats South Africa 3–0 in their opening group game. Christophe Dugarry and Thierry Henry are on the scoresheet, with an own goal from opponent Pierra Issa completing the victory.
- 18 June – France's World Cup quest continues in fine form with a 4–0 win over Saudi Arabia in which Thierry Henry scored twice, with the other goals coming from David Trezeguet and Bixente Lizarazu.
- 24 June – France are group winners and progress to the last 16 of the World Cup with a 2–1 win over Denmark in which Youri Djorkaeff and Emmanuel Petit score.
- 28 June – An extra time goal by Laurent Blanc gives France a 1–0 win over Paraguay in the last 16 of the World Cup.
- 3 July – France win the World Cup quarter final against Italy on penalties after a goalless draw.
- 8 July – France reach the World Cup final with a semi-final win over Croatia. Defender Lilian Thuram is on the scoresheet twice in a 2–1 win.
- 12 July – France are football world champions for the first time ever with a 3–0 win over holders Brazil at the Stade de France. Zinedine Zidane scores twice before Emmanuel Petit's injury time goal completes the victory.
- 10 September – Peugeot launches the all-new 206 supermini, a replacement for the long-running 205. It gives Peugeot a much more modern car to rival the likes of the Ford Fiesta and Volkswagen Polo.
- 31 December – The final Peugeot 205 rolls off the assembly line, more than 15 years after production began. It was mostly sold only in France for the last two years of its production, having been one of Europe's best selling cars in the late 1980s and early 1990s. Its replacement is the 206, which has been built in France and Britain since the autumn.

== Arts and literature ==
- Claude Serre, French cartoonist (b. 1938)

== Sport ==
- 10 June – 1998 FIFA World Cup begins in France.
- 28 June – French Grand Prix takes place, won by Michael Schumacher of Germany.
- 11 July – Tour de France begins in Dublin, Ireland.
- 12 July – World Cup ends, won by France.
- 2 August – Tour de France ends, won by Marco Pantani of Italy.

== Births ==
- 11 March – Axel Disasi, footballer
- 2 October – Maxime Godart, actor
- 22 October – Cécile Haussernot, chess player
- 17 December – Pierre Gouzou, trampoline gymnast
- 20 December – Kylian Mbappé, footballer

== Deaths ==
=== January to March ===
- 18 January – Georges Coudray, politician (b. 1902)
- 28 January – Louise Laroche, one of the last remaining survivors of the sinking of the RMS Titanic (b. 1910)
- 6 February – Marcela Delpastre, author (b. 1925)
- 9 February – Maurice Schumann, politician (b. 1911)
- 1 March – Jean Marie Balland, Roman Catholic cardinal (b. 1934)
- 30 March – Michèle Arnaud, singer, producer and director (b. 1919)

=== April to June ===
- 4 April – Pierre Lantier, composer and pianist (b. 1910)
- 8 April – René Pellos, artist (b. 1900)
- 13 April – Patrick de Gayardon, skydiver, skysurfer and BASE jumper (b. 1960)
- 19 April – Armand Jammot, television producer (b. 1922)
- 21 April – Jean-François Lyotard, philosopher and literary theorist (b. 1924)
- 22 April – Régine Pernoud, historian and medievalist (b. 1909)
- 27 April – Anne Desclos, journalist and novelist (b. 1907)
- 13 May – Chantal Mauduit, alpinist (b. 1964)
- 14 June – Ginette Mathiot, food writer (b. 1907)
- 14 June – Éric Tabarly, sailor (b. 1931)
- 29 June – Louis Hostin, weightlifter and Olympic champion (b. 1908)
- 30 June – Léon Arthur Elchinger, Bishop of Strasbourg (b. 1908)
- June – Jean Emile Charon, nuclear physicist (b. 1920)

=== July to December ===
- 4 July – Roger Calmel, composer (b. 1920)
- 6 August – André Weil, mathematician (b. 1906)
- 6 October – Jean-François Jenny-Clark, double bass player (b. 1944)
- 20 October – René Pleimelding, soccer player (b. 1925)
- 8 November – Jean Marais, actor (b. 1913)
- 10 November – Jean Leray, mathematician (b. 1906)
- 11 November – Gérard Grisey, composer (b. 1946)
- 13 November – Edwige Feuillère, actress (b. 1907)
- 13 November – Claude Serre, cartoonist (b. 1938)
- November – Gustave Malécot, mathematician (b. 1911)
- 15 December – Paul Rivière, Resistance fighter and politician (b. 1912)

=== Full date unknown ===
- Maurice Bardèche, essayist, literary and art critic, journalist and Neo-Fascist (b. 1907)
- Lucien Bodard, reporter and writer on events in Asia (b. 1914)
- Jean-Pierre Brucato, soccer player (b. 1944)
- Philippe Charbonneaux, product designer (b. 1917)
- Louis Dumont, anthropologist (b. 1911)
- Jacques Médecin, politician (b. 1928)
- Jean-Jacques Millant, bow maker (b. 1928)
- Jackie Sardou, actress (b. 1919)
- Marc Sautet, philosopher and writer (b. 1947)
- Pierre Villette, composer (b. 1926)

== See also ==
- 1998 in French television
- List of French films of 1998
