= 2012 in French television =

This is a list of French television related events from 2012.

== Events ==
- 12 May – Stéphan Rizon wins the first series of The Voice: la plus belle voix.
- 7 September – Nadège Jones wins the sixth series of Secret Story.
- 1 December – Singer Emmanuel Moire and his partner Fauve Hautot win the third series of Danse avec les stars.
- 26 December – Shadow theatre company Die Mobilés win the seventh series of La France a un incroyable talent.

== Debuts ==
- 25 February – The Voice: la plus belle voix (2012–present)
- 12 November – Harry (2012–2013)
- 6 December – Star Academy (2001–2008, 2012–2013, 2022-present)
- 11 December – Nouvelle Star (2003–2010, 2012–2017)

== Television shows ==
=== 1940s ===
- Le Jour du Seigneur (1949–present)

=== 1950s ===
- Présence protestante (1955–present)

=== 1970s ===
- 30 millions d'amis (1976–2016)

=== 2000s ===
- Plus belle la vie (2004–2022)
- La France a un incroyable talent (2006–present)
- Secret Story (2007–2017, 2024-present)

=== 2010s ===
- Danse avec les stars (2011–present)

== Ending this year ==
- Tsilla Chelton
- Jacques Duby

== Networks and services ==
=== Launches ===
Network	Type	Launch date	Notes	Source
beIN Sport	Cable and satellite	1 June		
Golf+	Cable television	4 July		
Discovery Science	Cable television	18 September		
D8	Cable and satellite	7 October		
Numero 23	Cable and satellite	1 December		
6ter	Cable and satellite	12 December		
Cherie 25	Cable and satellite	12 December		
RMC Découverte	Cable and satellite	12 December		
RMC Story	Cable television	12 December		
TF1 Series Films	Cable and satellite	12 December		

=== Conversions and rebrandings ===
Old network name	New network name	Type	Conversion Date	Notes	Source
Direct Star	D17	Cable and satellite	Unknown		
13eme Rue HD Universal	13eme Rue	Cable and satellite	Unknown		
BRTV	Berbère Télévision	Cable and satellite	May		

=== Closures ===
Network	Type	Closure date	Notes	Source
AlloCiné TV	Cable and satellite	15 April		
TPS Star	Cable and satellite	4 May		
Direct 8	Cable and satellite	7 October		
Direct Star	Cable and satellite	7 October		

== See also ==
- 2012 in France
