= 1974 in French television =

This is a list of French television related events from 1974.

== Events ==
- 6 April – France's entrant Dani withdraws from the Eurovision Song Contest 1974 as a mark of respect due to the recent death of the French President Georges Pompidou

== Debuts ==
- 3 January – Le secret des Flamands (1974)
- 6 May – Nans le berger (1974)
- 19 October – Histoires insolites (1974–1979)
- 20 December – Chéri-Bibi (1974–1975)
- 21 December – The Tiger Brigades (1974–1983)

=== 1950s ===
- Discorama
- Présence protestante (1955–)

=== 1960s ===
- La Tête et les Jambes (1960–1978)
- Les Coulisses de l'exploit (1961–1972)
- Les Dossiers de l'écran (1967–1991)
- Monsieur Cinéma (1967–1980)
- Les Animaux du monde (1969–1990)
- Alain Decaux raconte (1969–1987)
- Télé-Philatélie

== Ending this year ==
- Arsène Lupin (since 1971)
- Aux frontières du possible (since 1971)

== See also ==
- 1974 in France
- List of French films of 1974
