= 1976 in French television =

This is a list of French television related events from 1976.

== Events ==
- 29 March – Catherine Ferry is selected to represent France at the 1976 Eurovision Song Contest with her song "Un, deux, trois". She is selected to be the twentieth French Eurovision entry during a national final.

== Debuts ==
- 6 January – 30 millions d'amis (1976–2016)
- 22 March – Les Jeux de 20 Heures (1976–1987)

== Television shows ==
=== 1940s ===
- Le Jour du Seigneur (1949–present)

=== 1950s ===
- La Piste aux étoiles (1956–1978)

=== 1960s ===
- La Tête et les Jambes (1960–1978)
- Les Coulisses de l'exploit (1961–1972)
- Les Dossiers de l'écran (1967–1991)
- Monsieur Cinéma (1967–1980)
- Les Animaux du monde (1969–1990)
- Alain Decaux raconte (1969–1987)
- Télé-Philatélie

=== 1970s ===
- Aujourd'hui Madame (1970–1982)

== Ending this year ==
- La Une est à vous (1973–1976, 1987–1994)

== Births ==
- 23 March – Elisa Tovati, singer, actress & TV personality
- 5 October – Alessandra Sublet, TV & radio presenter

== Deaths ==
- 19 March – Albert Dieudonné, actor, screenwriter, film director and novelist (born 1889).

== See also ==
- 1976 in France
- List of French films of 1976
