= 2014 in French television =

This is a list of French television related events from 2014.

== Events ==
- 26 January – Twin Twin are selected to represent France at the 2014 Eurovision Song Contest with their song "Moustache". They are selected to be the fifty-seventh French Eurovision entry during a national final held at the France 3 Studios in Paris.
- 20 February – Mathieu Saikaly wins the tenth series of Nouvelle Star.
- 10 May – Kendji Girac wins the third series of The Voice: la plus belle voix.
- 20 September – 10-year-old Carla Georges wins the first series of The Voice Kids.
- 26 September – Leila Ben Khalifa wins the eighth series of Secret Story.
- 29 November – Pep's actor Rayane Bensetti and his partner Denitsa Ikonomova win the fifth series of Danse avec les stars.

== Television shows ==
=== 1940s ===
- Le Jour du Seigneur (1949–present)

=== 1950s ===
- Présence protestante (1955–present)

=== 1970s ===
- 30 millions d'amis (1976–2016)

=== 2000s ===
- Nouvelle Star (2003–2010, 2012–2017)
- Plus belle la vie (2004–2022)
- La France a un incroyable talent (2006–present)
- Secret Story (2007–2017, 2024-present)

=== 2010s ===
- Danse avec les stars (2011–present)
- The Voice: la plus belle voix (2012–present)

== Networks and services ==
=== Launches ===
Network	Type	Launch date	Notes	Source
Nickelodeon Teen	Cable and satellite	19 November		

=== Closures ===
Network	Type	End date	Notes	Sources
TF6	Cable and satellite	31 December		

== See also ==
- 2014 in France
