= 2009 in French television =

This is a list of French television related events from 2009.

== Events ==
- 9 June – Soan wins the seventh series of Nouvelle Star.
- 25 September – Emilie Nefnaf wins series 3 of Secret Story.
- 28 September – Launch of the French version of The X Factor.
- 28 September – Sébastien Agius wins the first series of X Factor.
- 30 December – Dance troupe Les Echos-liés win the fourth series of La France a un incroyable talent.

== Debuts ==
- 28 September – X Factor (2009–2011)

== Television shows ==
=== 1940s ===
- Le Jour du Seigneur (1949–present)

=== 1950s ===
- Présence protestante (1955-present)

=== 1970s ===
- 30 millions d'amis (1976–2016)

=== 2000s ===
- Nouvelle Star (2003–2010, 2012–2017)
- Plus belle la vie (2004–2022)
- La France a un incroyable talent (2006–present)
- Secret Story (2007–2017, 2024-present)

== Networks and services ==
=== Launches ===
Network	Type	Launch date	Notes	Source
Clubbing TV	Cable and satellite	9 January		
Trace Caribbean	Cable television	12 February		

== Deaths ==
Date	Name	Age	Cinematic Credibility
16 September	Filip Nikolic	35	French actor & singer from 2Be3

== See also ==
- 2009 in France
