= 2004 in France =

- Decades: 1980s; 1990s; 2000s; 2010s; 2020s
- See also: History of France; Timeline of French history; List of years in France

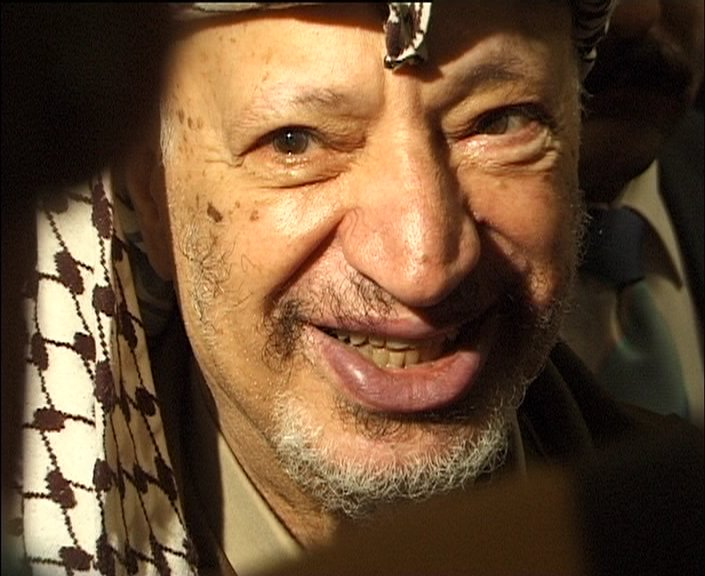
Yasser Arafat

Events from the year 2004 in France.

== Incumbents ==
- President – Jacques Chirac
- Prime Minister – Jean-Pierre Raffarin

== Events ==
- 3 January – Flash Airlines Flight 604 headed for Cairo crashes into the Red Sea. All 148 people on board are killed, of whom more than 120 were French tourists.
- 30 January – Former prime minister and current mayor of Bordeaux, Alain Juppé, is convicted of a party funding scam in the 1980s and early 1990s.
- 31 January – Air France and British Airways cancel five upcoming US flights to Washington, D.C., and Miami, Florida, amid fears of Al-Qaida.
- 10 February – The French National Assembly votes to pass a law banning religious items and clothing from schools.
- 20 February – The insecticide Regent (fipronil), from BASF, is banned in France for its implication in pollinator decline.
- 1 March – French troops are deployed to Haiti.
- 21–28 March – Regional elections held, in which the government of Prime Minister Jean-Pierre Raffarin suffers a stunning and unprecedented defeat.
- 5 April – Elizabeth II, Queen of the United Kingdom, begins a state visit to France in honour of the centennial of the Entente Cordiale. The following day, she addresses the French Senate.
- 23 April – The last coal mine in France closes, La Houve near Creutzwald, ending nearly 300 years of coal mining.
- 23 May – A section of the ceiling in Terminal 2E at Paris's Charles de Gaulle Airport collapses, claiming at least 6 lives.
- 27 May – Peugeot launches the 407 range of sedans, estates and coupes. It replaces the successful 406.
- 5 June – Noël Mamère, the mayor of Bègles, conducts a marriage ceremony for two men, even though same-sex marriage in France has not yet been legalised.
- 8 June – The pickled heart of Louis XVII is buried in the royal crypt at Saint-Denis.
- 13 June – European Parliament election in France.
- July – France released five of six suspects after their repatriation from Guantanamo Bay detainment camp.
- 26 September – Senate election held.
- 6 November – Clash between the armed forces of Côte d'Ivoire and French peacekeepers takes place (see: 2004 Ivorian-French violence).
- 14 December – The world's tallest bridge, the Millau bridge over the river Tarn in the Massif Central mountains, is opened by President Jacques Chirac
- 26 December – 95 French people are among thousands of people killed and 189 seriously injured by the 2004 Indian Ocean tsunami.

== Arts and literature ==
- 31 October – Denoël in Paris publishes Irène Némirovsky's Suite française, consisting of two novellas, Tempête en juin and Dolce, written and set in 1940–1941, from a sequence left unfinished on the author's death in Auschwitz concentration camp in 1942.

== Sport ==
- 3 July – Tour de France begins.
- 4 July – French Grand Prix won by Michael Schumacher of Germany.
- 25 July – Tour de France ends, won by Lance Armstrong of the United States.

== Births ==
- 4 January – Victor Wembanyama, basketball player
- 2 June – Leïla Lacan, basketball player
- 2 December – Aidan Chollet, snowboarder

== Deaths ==
=== January to March ===
- 3 January – Pierre Flamion, soccer player and manager (born 1924).
- 8 January – Franck Ténot, press agent, pataphysician and jazz critic (born 1925).
- 15 January
  - Robert-Ambroise-Marie Carré, priest and author (born 1908).
  - André Barrais, basketball player (born 1920).
- 22 January – Ticky Holgado, actor (born 1944).
- 13 February – François Tavenas, academic in Canada (born 1942).
- 18 February – Jean Rouch, filmmaker and anthropologist (born 1917).
- 21 February – Alex Métayer, comedian.
- 25 February – Jacques Georges, soccer administrator (born 1916).
- 4 March – Claude Nougaro, singer and songwriter (born 1929).
- 13 March – René Laloux, animator and film director (born 1929).
- 28 March – Robert Merle, novelist (born 1908).

=== April to June ===
- 25 April – Jacques Rouxel, animator (born 1931).
- 28 April – Patrick Berhault, mountain climber.
- April – Daniel Bernard, diplomat (born 1941).
- 1 May Jean-Jacques Laffont, economist (born 1947).
- 2 May – Paul Guimard, writer (born 1921).
- 28 May – Jean-Philippe Charbonnier, photographer (born 1921).
- 29 May – Gérard de Sède, author (born 1921).
- 31 May – Étienne Roda-Gil, songwriter and screenwriter (born 1941).
- 10 June – Antoine Argoud, twice attempted to assassinate Charles de Gaulle (born 1914).
- 11 June – Michel Roche, equestrian (born 1939).
- 18 June – André Gillois, writer and radio pioneer (born 1902).

=== July to September ===
- 9 July – Jean Lefebvre, actor (born 1919).
- 17 July – Lucien Leduc, soccer player and manager (born 1918).
- 18 July – Émile Peynaud, oenologist and researcher (born 1912).
- 24 July – Claude Ballif, composer (born 1924).
- 28 July – Bernard Saint-Hillier, General (born 1911).
- 3 August – Henri Cartier-Bresson, photographer (born 1908).
- 4 August – Cécile Guillame, first woman who engraved French postal stamps (born 1933).
- 9 August – Robert Lecourt, jurist, fourth President of the European Court of Justice (born 1908).
- 17 August – Gérard Souzay, baritone (born 1918).
- 20 August – Amelie Delagrange, murder victim (born 1982).
- 29 August – Jean-Louis Nicot, Air Force officer involved in the Algiers putsch (born 1911).
- 8 September – Raymond Marcellin, politician (born 1914).
- 9 September – Jean-Daniel Pollet, film director and screenwriter (born 1936).
- 24 September – Françoise Sagan, playwright, novelist and screenwriter (born 1935).
- 25 September – Alain Glavieux, professor in electrical engineering.
- 29 September – Richard Sainct, Rally Raid Motorcycle rider (born 1970).

=== October to December ===
- October – Jacques Noël, fencer (born 1920).
- 3 October – Jacques Benveniste, immunologist (born 1935).
- 8 October – Jacques Derrida, philosopher (born 1930).
- 22 October – Louis Bouyer, priest and writer (born 1913).
- 27 October
  - Pierre Béarn, writer (born 1902).
  - Claude Helffer, pianist (born 1922).
- 26 November – Philippe de Broca, film director (born 1933).
- 31 December – Gérard Debreu, economist and mathematician, won 1983 Nobel Memorial Prize in Economics (born 1921).

== See also ==
- 2004 in French television
- List of French films of 2004
