= Raymond Pichard =

French priest and television presenter

Raymond Pichard OP
- Born: Raymond Émile Guillaume Désiré Pichard; 19 April 1913; Moyaux, France
- Died: 24 February 1992 (aged 78); Caen, France
- Occupations: Television presenter, priest
- Known for: Le Jour du Seigneur

Raymond Pichard OP (10 April 1913 – 24 February 1992) was a French Dominican priest, who became best known for presenting the television show Le Jour du Seigneur.

== Biography ==
Raymond Pichard organized one of the earliest televised broadcasts of a mass on December 24, 1948 from Notre-Dame de Paris. This success inspired him to persuade the French Minister of Information, François Mitterrand to create a weekly 90-minute religious program on RTF. From 9 October 1949, a Catholic program was broadcast consisting of Mass, news, the history of the Church, and Christian lectures.

In 1950, Pichard created the production company Comité français de radio-télévision (CFRT) to broadcast religious programming on a weekly basis for 90 minutes, which would be entitled Le Jour du Seigneur in 1954. Le Jour du Seigneur is the longest running French television show. Raymond Pichard presented Le Jour du Seigneur from 1954 to 1975. Raymond Pichard was also the co-founder of Radio-Loisirs which later became Télérama.

Pichard also created Missionnaires de l'Audiovisuel in Rwanda in 1963.

== Bibliography ==
- Radio-télévision pour le Christ: histoire de la radio et de la télévision catholiques Janick Arbois, Raymond Pichard, A. Fayard, 1960, 120 p.
- André Morelle, Raymond Pichard, le dominicain cathodique, Buchet-Chastel, 2009, 197 p. ISBN 978-2283610893
