= Sud Ouest (newspaper) =

French newspaper

- Type: Daily newspaper
- Owner(s): Groupe Sud Ouest
- Editor: Patrick Venries
- Founded: 1944
- Language: French
- Headquarters: 23 Quai des Queyries, 33100 Bordeaux
- Country: France
- Circulation: 213,712 (as of 2020)
- ISSN: 1760-6454
- Website: sudouest.fr

Sud Ouest (pronounced [syd wɛst]; French for 'South West') is a daily French newspaper, the second largest regional daily in France in terms of circulation. It was created in Bordeaux, on August 29, 1944, by Jacques Lemoine, as a successor to La Petite Gironde. In 1949, the Sunday edition, Sud Ouest Dimanche was launched. Sud Ouest covers the Gironde, the Charente, the Charente-Maritime, the Dordogne, the Lot et Garonne, the Landes and the Pyrénées Atlantiques départements. It is owned by the Groupe Sud Ouest, which was directed by Jacques Lemoine from 1944 to 1968, and by his son Jean-François Lemoine from 1968 to 2001. The president of the group since February 2008 has been Pierre Jeantet. 80% of the group belongs to the Lemoine family, 10% to the journalists, and the remaining 10% to the staff.

== The Sud Ouest group ==
Besides Sud Ouest, the group has progressively broadened and now also owns La Charente Libre, La Dordogne Libre, La République des Pyrénées and L’Eclair des Pyrénées-Pays de l’Adour. In 2007, the Groupe Sud Ouest bought Le Midi Libre, L’Indépendant, Centre Presse (Aveyron) and Montpellier Plus from the group Le Monde, which was forced to sell these titles because of its crushing debt. These local papers of the Languedoc-Roussillon region, allow Groupe Sud Ouest to extend outside the Aquitaine and Poitou-Charentes regions. Besides the dailies, the Groupe Sud Ouest also owns the weekly magazines Le Résistant (Libourne), Haute Saintonge (Jonzac), Haute Gironde (Blaye), l’Hebdo de Charente Maritime (Surgères), La Semaine du Pays Basque, La Dépêche du Bassin and Le Journal du Médoc. The weeklies La Semaine du Roussillon, le Journal de Millau, l’Aveyronnais, le Catalan Judiciaire, Terre de Vins and Terres Catalanes, all published in Languedoc-Roussillon, were also sold by Le Monde to Groupe Sud Ouest in 2007. Groupe Sud Ouest publishes various surf magazines, including Surf Session, Bodyboard and Surfer's Journal. A publishing house, éditions Sud Ouest, specializes in local history, tourism and food and owns the local TV station, TV7 Bordeaux. The revenue of the group was 325 million euros in 2006, and after the absorption of the Languedoc-Roussillon papers, it expected a 555 million Euro revenue.

== The newspaper ==
The newspaper Sud Ouest distinguishes itself by a coverage more thorough than usual for a French local daily of the national and international news. Politically, the paper is rather neutral although it has once compared Bruno Mégret with Philippe Henriot after a meeting of the Front National in Bordeaux in the 1990s. It features an editorial cartoonist, Michel Iturria, and a regular opinion column signed by Franck de Bondt.

== Circulation ==
The paper circulation dropped from around 300,000 copies in 2007 to 210,000 copies in 2021.

Year	2010	2011	2012	2013	2014	2015	2016	2021
Sud Ouest	299,192	294,301	285,334	269,395	261,587	252,584	243,988	210,456
Sud Ouest Dimanche	273,846	270 293	257,470	245,558	244,779	232,597	224,855	
