= Vivolta =

- Country: France
- Broadcast area: France
- Headquarters: Ivry-sur-Seine, France

Programming
- Language: French
- Picture format: 576i (16:9 SDTV)

Ownership
- Owner: Télévista (Altice (80%); Discovery Networks CEEMEA (20 %))

History
- Launched: 10 December 2007; 18 years ago
- Founder: Philippe Gildas; Gaspard de Chavagnac
- Closed: 31 December 2018; 7 years ago

Links
- Website: vivolta.supadu.com

Vivolta was a French pay-tv-channel devoted "to the art of everyday feminine living" launched on December 10, 2007 at 8:45am. The channel ceased operations on December 31, 2018 at midnight.

== History ==
Created by Philippe Gildas and Gaspard de Chavagnac, Vivolta was operated by Télévista. Initially named Vista, the channel had to change its name before its launch, due to a copyright dispute with the Microsoft giant for its Windows Vista software.

Vivolta targeted the senior public segment (50 to 65 years), considered to be more mobile than other age groups. In April 2010, the programming was revised to fit a younger and more feminine audience.

In March 2012, Discovery International France took a 20% stake in Télévista to accompany the latter in its bid to obtain a TNT (Télévision numérique terrestre en France) frequency and in strengthening the Vivolta channel.

== Programming ==
Vivolta presented itself as "the channel of the art of everyday feminine living", since 2010 the company Televista has become beneficiary, three years after its launch.

From 2010 to 2012, Vivolta programming dealt with practical and everyday questions about family, couple, well-being, psychology, home, and cooking. The core programming targeted women aged 25 to 49. Since September 2012, Vivolta had evolved its programming into lifestyle entertainment programs.

== Broadcasting ==
Vivolta was initially exclusive on CanalSat and Numericable until 2011 when it arrives at ADSL operators. Having a poor audience, it ceased broadcasting on satellite and on Canalsat on 31 March 2014. It is no longer broadcast on SFR since 4 May 2015.

Vivolta was broadcast on French ISP networks (Orange, SFR and Free), on certain cable networks in France, Belgium, Luxembourg and Switzerland (Numericable, BeTV) and on Proximus TV.
