= Évelyne Pagès =

French journalist

- Born: Nicolle Évelyne Liberman; 25 February 1942; Nice, France
- Died: 13 June 2011 (aged 69)
- Occupations: Journalist, television producer

Évelyne Pagès ( 25 February 1942-June 13, 2011) was a French journalist and television host. She is most famous for presenting the RTL television show Aujourd'hui Madame which ran from 1970 to 1982. Pagès died of cancer.
