= 1998 French cantonal elections =

Cantonale elections to renew the first series of cantons general councillors were held in France on 15 and 22 March 1998.

== Electoral system ==
The cantonales elections use the same system as the regional or legislative elections. There is a 10% threshold (10% of registered voters) needed to proceed to the second round.

== Change in control ==
=== From right to left ===
- Aisne
- Allier
- Ardèche
- Finistère
- Gers
- Meurthe-et-Moselle
- Nord
- Puy-de-Dôme
- Pyrénées-Orientales
- Essonne
- Haute-Saône

== National results ==
Party/Alliance	% (first round)	% (second round)
PS	23.93%	34.42%
RPR	13.86%	16.52%
FN	13.83%	7.37%
UDF	13.50%	15.11%
Miscellaneous Right	13.23%	13.06%
PCF	10.15%	6.17%
Miscellaneous Left	5.28%	5.02%
Les Verts	3.43%	0.53%
Ecologists	0.72%	0.10%
MDC	0.69%	0.36%
Far-Left	0.61%	0.28%
Miscellaneous	0.50%	0.00%
PRG	0.19%	1.02%
Far-Right	0.08%	0.00%

== Sources ==
E-P
