= Campagnes TV =

- Country: France
- Broadcast area: France
- Headquarters: Paris, France

Programming
- Language: French
- Picture format: 576i (16:9 SDTV); 1080i (HDTV)

History
- Launched: 15 January 2013; 13 years ago
- Founder: Thierry Laval
- Closed: 31 October 2017; 8 years ago

Links
- Website: www.campagnestv.com

Campaigns TV was a French television channel specialized in rurality, environment and agriculture, broadcasting its program in France by cable, satellite and ADSL networks. The channel was founded by Thierry Laval.

== History ==
The TV channel was born on January 15, 2013. Inspired by its American-British sister channel, Rural TV, it was the leading news and entertainment channel in France, offering programs around the art of living in the country, terroirs, agriculture, agro-food and environment. In December 2014, Guy Vasseur, President of the Chambers of Agriculture (Chambres d'agriculture/APCA) also became President of the channel and Olivier Alleman was appointed as Deputy Chief Executive Officer. In March 2015, Campaigns TV launched its replay channel on the platform Wat.tv. Since June 2015, the program schedule of Campaigns TV was taken over by the weekly Télécâble Sat Hebdo. At the end of October 2017, the channel announced by video message that it will definitely cease broadcasting on October 31, 2017.

== Partnerships ==
Since its creation, Campagnes TV has been a partner of many events, like Fête de la Gastronomie, Game Fair, Grand National du Trot, Anjou Vélo Vintage.
