= OM TV =

- Country: France

Programming
- Picture format: ilgm

Ownership
- Owner: Olympique de Marseille

History
- Launched: 16 January 1999
- Closed: 1 September 2018

Links
- Website: www.om.net

OM TV is a subscription based-channel, entirely dedicated to the French football team Olympique de Marseille. The channel offers Marseille fans exclusive interviews with players and staff, full matches, including replays of all Ligue 1, Coupe de France, Coupe de la Ligue, Champions League/UEFA Cup and friendly games, in addition to vintage matches, football news and other themed programming. OM TV stopped broadcasting on 31 August 2018 for digital modernization on the social networks and the website.

Old logo.
