= Télévision Par Satellite =

Former French subscription television company

TPS
- Company type: Société anonyme
- Industry: Mass media
- Founded: 1996
- Defunct: 2008
- Fate: Acquired by Canal+
- Successor: CanalSat
- Headquarters: Paris, France
- Products: Satellite television ADSL television Digital television Television channels
- Owner: Eutelsat; Arte (France Télévisions (45%); French state (25%); Radio France (15%); INA (15%); TF1 Group; M6 Group; France Télévisions (1996–2002); CLT-UFA; France Telecom; Suez Environnement (1996–2008); Canal+ (2008)

Télévision Par Satellite (French: [televizjɔ̃ paʁ satɛlit]; TPS) was a French company that offered subscription television packages via satellite.

It was created in 1996 by Eutelsat and Arte, soon joined by the TF1 Group, the M6 Group, France Télévisions, RTL Group, France Telecom and Suez Environnement. France Télévisions left the company in 2002.

== Channels ==
TPS offered various channels, including some not owned by TPS:

- TPS Star, the general entertainment flagship channel
- TPS Foot, a football channel
- Multivision, a 7-channel premium PPV service
- And several movie channels: TPS Cineclub, TPS CinéComedy, TPS Cinéculte, TPS Cinextrême, TPS Cinéfamily, TPS Cinéstar, TPS Cinétoile and TPS Homecinéma.

Several of its channels made it to French Polynesia on the Tahiti Nui Satellite package in 2000.

On 31 August 2006 TPS merged with its competitor CanalSat, owned by the Canal+ Group.

The two distributors merged their packages on 21 March 2007. Essentially, TPS merged into CanalSat which was then branded as Nouveau CanalSat. All the TPS branded movie channels were merged into the Canal+-owned CinéCinéma package, TPS Star and TPS Foot being the only channels still using the TPS brand. Some new channels were launched on both platforms.

In 2011, the merger with TPS was cancelled by the Competition Authority. Canal+ appealed, and the Authority determined that its authorisation would be conditional on a number of injunctions, including "re-establish[ing] sufficient competition in the pay television market".
