= List of French films of 1982 =

A list of films produced in France in 1982.

Title	Director	Cast	Genre	Notes
À toute allure	Robert Kramer	Bernard Ballet	Drama	
All Night Long	Chantal Akerman	Angelo Abazoglou, Natalie Akerman, Michele Blondeel	Drama	French–Belgian co-production
The Angel	Patrick Bokanowski	Maurice Baquet, Jean-Marie Bon, Martine Couture	Drama	
Antonieta	Carlos Saura	Isabelle Adjani, Hanna Schygulla, Ignacio Tarso	Drama	French–Mexican–Spanish co-production
Aphrodite	Robert Fuest	Horst Buchholz, Valérie Kaprisky, Catherine Jourdan	Adult	
A Thousand Billion Dollars	Henri Verneuil	Patrick Dewaere, Mel Ferrer, Michel Auclair, Caroline Cellier, Charles Denner, Anny Duperey, Jeanne Moreau	Crime	
A Captain's Honor	Pierre Schoendoerffer	Jacques Perrin, Nicole Garcia, Georges Wilson, Charles Denner, Claude Jade, Georges Marchal, Jean-François Poron, Christophe Malavoy	Drame	
Espion, lève-toi	Yves Boisset	Lino Ventura, Bernard Fresson, Bruno Cremer, Krystyna Janda, Michel Piccoli, Heinz Bennent	Spy film	
Fanny and Alexander	Ingmar Bergman	Pernilla Allwin, Bertil Guve, Gunn Wållgren	Drama	Swedish–West German-French co-production
Five and the Skin	Pierre Rissient	Féodor Atkine, Eiko Matsuda, Gloria Diaz	Drama	French-Filipino co-production
The Hatter's Ghost	Claude Chabrol	Michel Serrault, Charles Aznavour, Monique Chaumette	Mystery, thriller	
Identification of a Woman	Michelangelo Antonioni	Tomas Milian, Daniela Silverio, Christine Boisson	Drama	Italian–French co-production
Invitation au voyage	Peter Del Monte	Laurent Malet, Nina Scott, Aurore Clément	Drama	French–Italian–West German co-production
L'amour des femmes	Michel Soutter	Heinz Bennent, Pierre Clémenti, Jean-Marc Bory	Comedy	Swiss–French co-production
L'As Des As	Gérard Oury	Jean-Paul Belmondo, Marie-France Pisier, Rachid Ferrache	Comedy, adventure	
L'Étoile du Nord	Pierre Granier-Deferre	Simone Signoret, Philippe Noiret, Fanny Cottençon	Drama	
La Balance	Bob Swaim	Nathalie Baye, Philippe Léotard, Richard Berry	Crime	
La Boum 2	Claude Pinoteau	Claude Brasseur, Brigitte Fossey, Sophie Marceau	Comedy, romance	
La Morte Vivante	Jean Rollin	Marina Pierro, Françoise Blanchard, Carina Barone	Horror	
Le Beau Mariage	Éric Rohmer	Béatrice Romand, André Dussollier, Arielle Dombasle	Comedy drama, romance	
Le Choc	Robin Davis	Alain Delon, Catherine Deneuve, Philippe Léotard	Thriller	
Le gendarme et les gendarmettes	Jean Girault, Tony Aboyantz	Louis de Funès, Michel Galabru, Maurice Risch	Comedy	
Le Père Noël est une ordure	Jean-Marie Poiré	Josiane Balasko, Anémone, Thierry Lhermitte	Comedy	
Les Maîtres du temps	René Laloux		Science fiction	Swiss-French-West German-British-Hungarian co-production
Les Misérables	Robert Hossein	Lino Ventura, Michel Bouquet, Jean Carmet	Drama	
Les Sous-doués en vacances	Claude Zidi	Daniel Auteuil, Guy Marchand, Grace de Capitani	Comedy	
The Magic Mountain	Hans W. Geißendörfer	Christoph Eichhorn, Marie-France Pisier, Flavio Bucci		West German–French–Italian–Austrian co-production
Parsifal	Hans-Jürgen Syberberg	Armin Jordan, Wolfgang Schöne, Martin Sperr	Musical	French–West German co-production
The Passerby	Jacques Rouffio	Romy Schneider, Michel Piccoli, Helmut Griem	Drama	French–West German co-production
Passion	Jean-Luc Godard	Hanna Schygulla, Michel Piccoli, Isabelle Huppert	Drama	Swiss–French co-production
Pour cent briques, t'as plus rien...	Édouard Molinaro	Daniel Auteuil, Gérard Jugnot	Comedy	
The Roaring Forties	Christian de Chalonge	Jacques Perrin, Julie Christie, Michel Serrault	Drama	
Qu'est-ce qu'on attend pour être heureux!	Coline Serreau	Henri Garcin, Évelyne Buyle	Comedy	
Que les gros salaires lèvent le doigt!	Denys Granier-Deferre	Jean Poiret, Michel Piccoli	Comedy, Drama	
Querelle	Rainer Werner Fassbinder	Brad Davis, Franco Nero, Jeanne Moreau	Drama	West German–French co-production
The Return of Martin Guerre	Daniel Vigne	Gérard Depardieu, Bernard-Pierre Donnadieu, Roger Planchon	Drama	
The Scorpion with Two Tails	Sergio Martino	Claudio Cassinelli, Elvire Audray, John Saxon	Horror, thriller	Italian–French co-production
Shot Pattern	Jean-Claude Missiaen	Gérard Lanvin, Véronique Jannot, Michel Constantin	Crime	
Sweet Inquest on Violence	Gérard Guérin	Michael Lonsdale, Prune Bergé, Elise Caron		
T'empêches tout le monde de dormir	Gérard Lauzier	Philippe Khorsand, Tanya Lopert	Comedy	
That Night in Varennes	Ettore Scola	Jean-Louis Barrault, Marcello Mastroianni, Hanna Schygulla	Historical	French–Italian co-production
Tir groupé	Jean-Claude Missiaen	Corinne Touzet, Franck Capillery	Crime, Drama	
Tout Feu, Tout Flamme	Jean-Paul Rappeneau	Yves Montand, Isabelle Adjani, Alain Souchon		
The Trout	Joseph Losey	Isabelle Huppert, Jean-Pierre Cassel, Jeanne Moreau	Drama	
Une chambre en ville	Jacques Demy	Dominique Sanda, Richard Berry, Danielle Darrieux	Comedy-drama, musical	
Violence in a Women's Prison	Bruno Mattei	Laura Gemser, Gabriele Tinti, Lorraine de Selle	Adult	Italian–French co-production

== See also ==
- 1982 in France
- 1982 in French television
