= List of French films of 1969 =

berb

A list of films produced in France in 1969.

French films released in 1969
Title	Director	Cast	Genre	Notes
Army of Shadows	Jean-Pierre Melville	Lino Ventura, Simone Signoret, Jean-Pierre Cassel	Drama	French-Italian co-production
The Auvergnat and the Bus	Guy Lefranc	Fernand Raynaud, Julien Guiomar, Christiane Minazzoli	Comedy	
The Battle of El Alamein	Giorgio Ferroni	Frederick Stafford, Ira von Fürstenberg, Robert Hossein	War	Italian-French co-production
The Brain	Gérard Oury	Jean-Paul Belmondo, David Niven, Eli Wallach	Comedy	French-Italian co-production
Calcutta	Louis Malle		Documentary	
Cemetery Without Crosses	Robert Hossein	Robert Hossein, Michèle Mercier, Serge Marquand	Western	French-Italian co-production
The Christmas Tree	Terence Young	William Holden, Bourvil, Virna Lisi	Drama	French-Italian co-production
The Devil by the Tail	Philippe de Broca	Yves Montand, Madeleine Renaud, Maria Schell	Comedy	French-Italian co-production
Erotissimo	Gérard Pirès	Annie Girardot, Jean Yanne, Francis Blanche	Comedy	French-Italian co-production
A Gentle Woman	Robert Bresson	Dominique Sanda, Guy Frangin, Jane Lobre	Drama	
A Golden Widow	Michel Audiard	Michèle Mercier, Claude Rich, Roger Carel	Comedy	French-Italian-West German co-production
Goto, Island of Love	Walerian Borowczyk	Pierre Brasseur, Ligia Branice, Jean-Pierre Andréani	Drama	
The Great Love	Pierre Étaix	Pierre Étaix, Annie Fratellini, Nicole Calfan	Comedy	
Hibernatus	Edouard Molinaro	Louis de Funès, Claude Gensac, Michael Lonsdale	Comedy	French-Italian co-production
Jeff	Jean Vautrin	Alain Delon, Mireille Darc	Crime	French-Italian co-production
Joy of Learning	Jean-Luc Godard	Juliet Berto, Jean-Pierre Léaud	Avant-garde	
La Piscine	Jacques Deray	Alain Delon, Romy Schneider, Maurice Ronet, Jane Birkin	Drama	French-Italian co-production
La Promesse	Robert Freeman	Jacqueline Bisset	Drama	
Les Femmes	Jean Aurel	Brigitte Bardot, Maurice Ronet, Anny Duperey	Comedy	French-Italian co-production
Medea	Pier Paolo Pasolini	Maria Callas, Giuseppe Gentili, Laurent Terzieff	Drama	Italian-French-West German co-production
The Milky Way	Luis Buñuel	Laurent Terzieff, Paul Frankeur, Alain Cuny	Comedy-drama	French-Italian co-production
Mississippi Mermaid	François Truffaut	Catherine Deneuve, Jean-Paul Belmondo, Michel Bouquet	Drama	French-Italian co-production
More	Barbet Schroeder	Mimsy Farmer, Klaus Grünberg, Heinz Engelmann	Drama	French-Luxembourgian co-production
Mr. Freedom	William Klein	John Abbey, Delphine Seyrig, Donald Pleasence	Comedy, Fantasy	
My Night at Maud's	Éric Rohmer	Jean-Louis Trintignant, Françoise Fabian, Antoine Vitez	Comedy-drama	
My Uncle Benjamin	Edouard Molinaro	Jacques Brel, Claude Jade, Rosy Varte	Comedy	French-Italian co-production
One on Top of the Other	Lucio Fulci	Elsa Martinelli, Jean Sorel, Marisa Mell, John Ireland	Mystery	Italian-French-Spanish co-production
Orgasmo	Umberto Lenzi	Carroll Baker, Lou Castel, Colette Descombes	Thriller	Italian-French co-production
Pigsty	Pier Paolo Pasolini	Pierre Clémenti, Jean-Pierre Léaud, Alberto Lionello	Comedy-drama	Italian-French co-production
The Sicilian Clan	Henri Verneuil	Jean Gabin, Alain Delon, Lino Ventura	Crime	French-Italian co-production
Slogan	Pierre Grimblat	Serge Gainsbourg, Jane Birkin, Andréa Parisy	Romantic drama	
So Sweet... So Perverse	Umberto Lenzi	Carroll Baker, Jean-Louis Trintignant, Erika Blanc	Thriller	Italian-West German-French co-production
The Specialists	Sergio Corbucci	Johnny Hallyday, Gastone Moschin, Françoise Fabian, Mario Adorf	Western	French-Italian-West German co-production
This Man Must Die	Claude Chabrol	Michel Duchaussoy, Caroline Cellier, Jean Yanne	Thriller	French-Italian co-production
Time to Live	Bernard Paul	Marina Vlady, Frederic de Pasquale, Catherine Allegret	Comedy-drama	
Under the Sign of the Bull	Gilles Grangier	Jean Gabin, Suzanne Flon	Drama	
The Unfaithful Wife	Claude Chabrol	Stéphane Audran, Michel Bouquet, Maurice Ronet	Drama	French-Italian Co-production
The Witness	Anne Walter	Claude Jade, Gérard Barray, Jean-Claude Dauphin	Thriller	French-Italian co-production
Z	Costa Gavras	Irene Papas, Jean-Louis Trintignant, Yves Montand	Thriller	French-Algerian co-production

== See also ==
- 1969 in France
- 1969 in French television
