= Yoann Sover =

French actor and television presenter

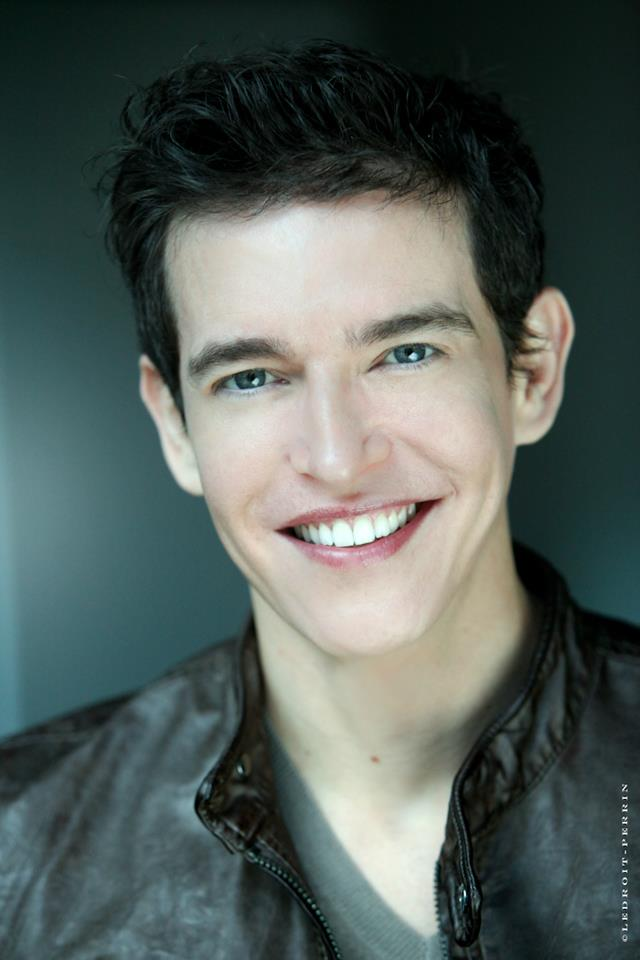
- Born: February 20, 1980 (age 45); Bois-Colombes (France)
- Occupations: Actor, television presenter & dubbing artist.
- Years active: 1980–present
- Website: www.yoannsover.com

Yoann Bellot Sover (born February 20, 1980) is a French actor and television presenter primarily known as one of the most prolific dubbing artist in the French-speaking world having lent his voice to over a hundred mainstream international productions. Sover is the regular voice of numerous actors such as Zac Efron, Chad Michael Murray, Jackson Rathbone, Dave Franco, Drew Fuller or Ben Whishaw. In gaming, his voice credits include Hayner in Kingdom Hearts II (2005), Spider-Man in Disney Infinity 2.0 (2014), Otta Baseballson in Assassin's Creed Valhalla (2020) or Bala-Tik in Lego Star Wars : The Skywalker Saga (2022). He was also the voice of numerous advertising campaigns and vocal guidance for leading brands such as l'Oréal, Disney, Disneyland Paris, Hasbro, Lego, Paco Rabanne, Orange, Carrefour, Spotify, Monopoly, Rimmel or even the French national postal service La Poste. As of 2023, as a thespian, Sover appeared in 15 stage productions, 4 feature films and over 20 television productions.

== Filmography ==
=== Video games ===
- Kingdom Hearts II (2006) : Hayner
- Disney Infinity 2.0 (2014) : Spider-Man
- Watch Dogs: Legion (2020) : Radio voice
- Assassin's Creed Valhalla (2020) : Otta Baseballson
- Ratchet & Clank: Rift Apart (2021) : Additional voices
- Dying Light 2 (2022) : Additional voices
- Horizon Forbidden West (2022) : Additional voices
- Lego Star Wars : The Skywalker Saga (2022) : Bala-Tik, additional voices
- Cookie Run: Kingdom (2022) : Milk Cookie

== See also ==
- Dubbing in France
