= Jacques Rouland =

French actor, director, and television presenter

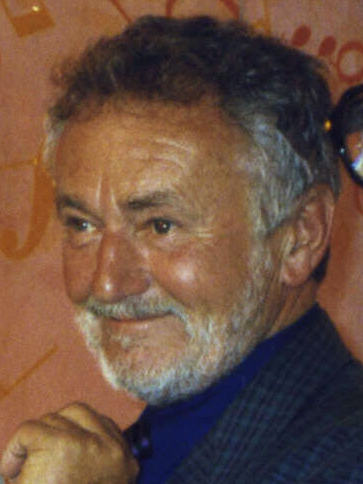
- Jacques Rouland, circa 1991.
- Born: 13 November 1929; Saint-Sauveur-le-Vicomte, France
- Died: 14 June 2002 (aged 72); Bois-Guillaume, France
- Occupation(s): Actor, director, screenwriter, and playwright
- Known for: La Caméra invisible

Jacques Rouland (13 November 1929 – 14 June 2002) was a French radio and television broadcaster.

== Biography ==
In 1964 created and presented the hidden camera show La Caméra invisible where he made practical jokes on unsuspecting members of the public. the show ended in 1970. After the show ended Rouland created another popular French television show called Mardi Cinéma.

Jacques Rouland died on 14 June, following a battle with cancer.

== Bibliography ==
- Les Fous rires de la caméra cachée, Paris, Acropolis (ISBN 2-7357-0122-0)
- Les Employés du gag « Garder le sourire » « La caméra invisible », Paris, Calmann-Lévy, 1989 (ISBN 270210746X)
- Les Sacapoux, Paris, Seine, 1998 (ISBN 2738206875)
- Ma caméra invisible, Paris, Pygmalion, 1999 (ISBN 2857046006)
- Les Amoureux du 7e art, Paris, Jade, 1985; J'ai lu, 2001 (ISBN 227722300X)
