= TFJ =

- Country: France

Programming
- Language: French

History
- Launched: 1 May 1998
- Founder: Ghislain Allon
- Closed: 24 November 2006

TFJ (Télévision Française Juive, Jewish French television) was a French television station. The first Jewish TV station in Europe, TFJ began broadcasting on 14 May 1998, and stopped broadcasting on 24 November 2006.

== History ==
=== Shalom Channel Europe ===
The channel was founded in 1997 as Shalom Channel Europe (SCE), with the goal of launching in 1998. The channel was created to fill in a gap in the European Jewish media scene, where countries like France and Belgium had successful Jewish radio stations, but there was no dedicated television channel, while other religious communities already had such resources. Its aim was to broadcast a free-to-air satellite signal to find an audience, under the goals that it would not propagate Zionism and would not limit itself to ethnical minorities, being rather a channel with universal appeal and the possibility of inter-religious dialogue. The founder of SCE was Albert Myara, of the Jewish Community of Geneva (at the time, it was not clear if the channel would broadcast from Paris or Geneva), with a 30 April 1998 deadline. From November 1997 to the end of the deadline, it would air its test transmissions in the clear, and later move to a subscription service.

Israel also had a key role in its development. Its financial aid came from a company registered in Tel Aviv and the second-largest channel in Israel at the time, through The News Company, would provide a substantial amount of its news content. News was going to take 30% of its airtime; 25% to education and culture, 20% to entertainment and 10% to children and youth. It was scheduled to air daily from 5 pm to 12:30 am with the exception of Shabbat and Jewish holidays. Myara set a 50,000 subscriber goal for its third year on air; the channel was also funded by advertising.

=== Early years of TFJ ===
Shalom Channel started receiving competition from TFJ in April 1998. The channel was created by Ghislain Allon and Michaela Heine in 1997 with a capital of 250,000 francs, in time for the 50th anniversary of the creation of the State of Israel (which was also SCE's goal) and both channels went regular at the same time. The channel opened on 30 April and, by 3 May, had broadcast over 80 hours of programming, more than SCE's limited schedule, including live broadcasts from Trocadéro, debates, documentaries and movies. It also broadcast in several languages, like its competitor (French, German, English, Russian, Hebrew). With an annual budget of 20 million francs, it was aimed at having a 12-hour line-up, which would have two to three hours of new content a day. A half-hour newscast was also included on its offer, which, like SCE, was split evenly between footage from Israeli Television (in this case, selected footage from Channel 1's Mabat) and field reports from the Jewish diaspora.

On 10 September 1999, the channel launched on Lyonnaise Câble.

=== Financial problems ===
The channel's situation deteriorated in 2002, when an agreement signed between TFJ and Charisma in August 1999 caused a debt. In the terms of the contract, Charisma should supply staff and equipments to TFJ. In exchange, the channel had no resources, which led to a lengthy debt process which was being accumulated for three years. After a raise in its finances in November 2001, these debts turned into capital investments. Without paying a cent, supplier Charisma became responsible for the control of the channel, eventually selling a large part of its shares to its executives, who later became in charge. The lack of transparency, including the lack of publicly disclosed data on the transactions, led to the opening of an investigation. Charisma's executives were also in negotiations with CNC due to its refund of part of its 1.7 million franc investment in funding programs for the channel.

On 30 March 2003, Ghislain Allon and a group of guests set up a seven-hour fundraising campaign (5 pm to midnight) in order to raise more capital for the channel; if the goals weren't met, the channel would be taken off the air from TPS and Noos on 2 April. By the end of the event, 2,200 investors, including non-Jews, had made their donations. The exact figures were not publicly disclosed, but this would help TFJ stay afloat for one more year. At the time, the annual budget was of €1,5 million, airing three-and-a-half hours of new content every day and news bulletins every two hours.

=== Judicial liquidation ===
TFJ was put under judicial liquidation on 20 April 2005 by the Commercial Court of Nanterre after a lack of contractual renewal with Charisma Films.

=== Relaunch ===
In the wake of the liquidation, Marc Fiorentino, a Tunisian Jew, acquired the channel in 2005, with the aim of relaunching it.

On 26 February 2006, TFJ relaunched with a new look, a new identity and a new schedule. The new format was centered on three axes: news, culture and religion, with a 50% minimum for in-house productions. 20% of the new line-up was Israeli, with IBA Channel 1 providing content, especially the news. It also had plans to get a digital terrestrial license for a multi-religious channel.

In order to diversify its finances, it was now inspired by M6's business model, generating more revenue from diversifying its activities rather than just advertising (advertising alone accounted for 40% of the revenue). In 2007, it was projected that the channel would have €1 million in ad revenue for a one-year period. There was also the establishment of a viewers' club,

Under the new format, the channel was now known as "the channel promised to all" (la chaîne promise à tous), based on the notion of the Promised Land.

=== Closure ===
Facing financial difficulties, TFJ suspended its operations at 11 am on 24 November 2006. The channel was converting its distribution method from satellite (Globecast) to cable (Noos) but the channel was suspended by Globecast before a fiber connection was established.

== Controversies ==
On 17 November 2004, TFJ announced its intent to issue a complaint against comedian Dieudonné for "outrageous" comments about the channel, who compared it to the Hezbollah-owned Al-Manar. Dieudonné made his comments on France 2's Tout le monde en parle, claiming TFJ to be a "religious" channel that "represents interests", which was contrary to its beliefs of being apolitical and ideologically open.
