= June (TV channel) =

French TV channel

june
- Country: France
- Broadcast area: France, Switzerland and Belgium
- Headquarters: Levallois-Perret

Programming
- Language: French

Ownership
- Owner: Lagardère Active
- Sister channels: Canal J, TiJi, MCM

History
- Launched: 1 September 2004
- Closed: 1 September 2016 (12 years)
- Replaced by: Elle Girl
- Former names: Filles TV (2004–2009)

June (stylized as june and formerly called Filles TV until October 2009) was a French TV channel which launched on 1 September 2004. This channel was mainly distributed in France in exclusivity on Canalsat and other cable networks, and also in neighbouring French-speaking countries.

== History ==
At launch, June was launched as Filles TV, the channel aired series and emissions for pre-teen and teen girls aged 10 to 18 such as South of Nowhere, Frequency 4, So?, Degrassi: The Next Generation, My Lifestar, Is there a brain in this model? or The Janice Dickinson Modeling Agency. All the programmes which used to air in June was dubbed in French. But Sabrina, the Teenage witch was given only in French subtitles.

In September 2006, Filles TV unveiled a new logo meant to be less girly. It unveiled another logo the following year which kept its epsilon, with Filles TV assuming a 15-24 target range.

On 13 October 2009, Filles TV became June, refocusing as a young adult channel with the ambition to become the channel of reference for women aged 20 to 30, turning to be a feminine counterpart to MCM instead of Canal J as it initially was created. The rebranding was launched with a campaign starring Jonathan Cohen wanting to integrate for the channel "which makes you want to be a girl", according to its motto. Hence, June started broadcasting shows like Skins and some animated series like Sabrina and Nana

From Summer 2014, the exploitation of the June website (as well as MCM and Virgin Radio) was given to the infotainment digital media Melty. June was also renamed June TV in its final years.

June ended its programming on 1 September 2016 past midnight, to get replaced by Elle Girl launching on 15 September, as a full Canal exclusive in France (not getting carried by Numericable), and expanded its target range into women from 18 to 50. The channel would share the prestigious brand of the magazine Elle and made productions and promotion in association with the latter which was also owned by Lagardère.

On 16 July 2019, Elle Girl TV shut down for good ahead of the acquisition of Lagardère Active by Groupe M6, and Canal+ not renewing its exclusive contract.

=== Slogans ===
- Filles TV (2004 – October 2009): "Enterrez votre vie de jeune fille"
- June (October 2009 – August 2016): "La télé qui donne envie d'être une fille"

== Programs ==
=== 2006–2007 season ===
- Emily
- Kawai

The show features a "tribe" pretty facilitators, each with a specific personality. Brown, blonde, Mediterranean or angelic, each giving his opinion and style in writing his columns. They offer a blog, via the website of the chain. Facilitators: Leah, Emmy, Baya, Alison, Laureline, Djenne and Audrey

=== 2009–2010 season ===
June offers seven days with them, a weekly magazine run by Claire Elizabeth Beaufort accompanied by five journalists aged 20–30 years including Zazon. In a setting of apartment, they review the news of the week. Each columnist for his chosen field: fashion, environment, welfare, cheap ...

June offers the weekly June's people Gossip, a period of six minutes. Juliette Longuet, French designer based in New York, says the collaboration already established with Girls TV for the appointment New York City. The show delivers tips and useful addresses for the American metropolis and also address the capital of Paris, with Paris, Paris.

Regarding fiction, June diffuse season 2 of the seriesSamantha Who?, Season 1 The L Word, Season 2 of Skins and first five seasons of Dawson.

The chain is also involved in the emission of reality TV to deal with fashion and art. Anne Slowey, editor of a famous American women's magazine offers Stylista, the subject of the recruitment of an assistant. The Janice Dickinson Modeling Agency reveals the castings made by the former wife of Sylvester Stallone and boss of a modeling agency, Janice Dickinson. Going against the foot of a beauty contest which it takes the form, the show In search of inner beauty is in competition of candidates who unbeknownst to them, their human qualities.

== Series ==
Title	Origin
4 Frequency	Argentina
Being Eve	New Zealand
Blue Water High	Australia
Blue Water High: New Promo	Australia
Clueless	US
Dawson's Creek	US
Degrassi: The Next Generation	Canada
Don't Trust the B— in Apartment 23	US
FreeTime	UK
Friday Wear	France
Greek	United States
Hart of Dixie	United States
Helen and the Boys	France
Hellcats	US
Life as it is	US
Love's Holiday	France
My life as a star	Canada
Nana	Japan
Our Secret Lives	Australia
Pajama Party	Australia
Physics or Chemistry	Spain
Plus belle la vie	France
Presserebelle.com	Canada
Pretty Little Liars	US
Radio Free Roscoe	Canada
Sabrina, the Teenage Witch	US
Samantha who ?	US
Sarah	US
S Club 7	UK
Secrets Girls!	UK
Short Cuts	Australia
Skins	UK
So?	UK
South of Nowhere	US
Student Bodies	Canada
Studio South	France
Taina	US
The Best Years	United States
The L Word	United States
The Nightmare Room	US
Trinity	UK
Under the Sun	France

== Related ==
- Canal J
- Gulli
- Lagardère Active
- TiJi
