= Foot School TV =

Defunct Luxembourgish-French television channel

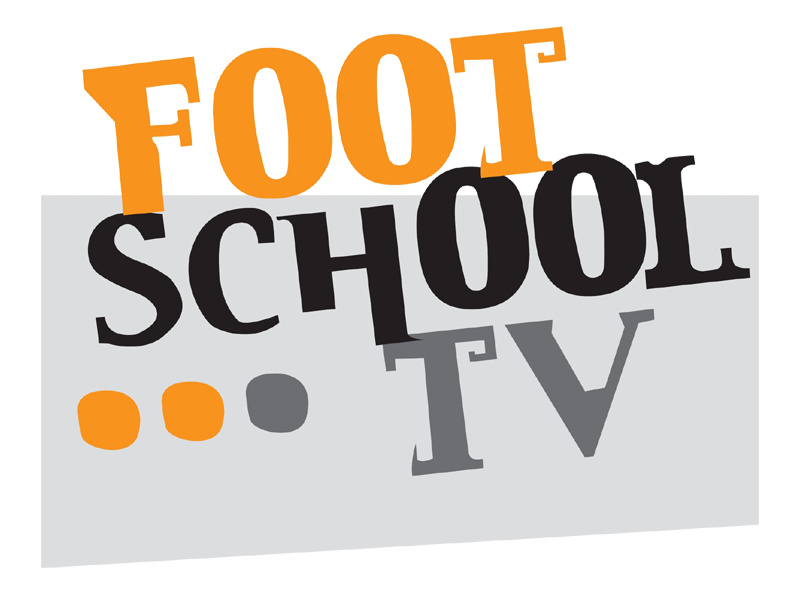

History
- Launched: April 23, 2003
- Closed: August 20, 2013
- Former names: TFOU TV (until 28 February 2008)

Foot School TV (formerly TFOU TV) was a Luxembourgish-French television channel owned by the Luxembourgish company Premium2Home (P2H), with offices in Paris. It was originally launched as TFOU TV by TF1 on 23 April 2003, and was available on multichannel television platforms like TPS, Orange TV, Club Internet and Freebox TV. On 29 February 2008, the channel was relaunched as Foot School TV, before it was shut down on 20 August 2013.

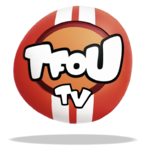
The last logo of TFOU TV, used from 2007 until 2008

The TFOU name continues to be used by a programming block on TF1, which was launched on 1 January 2007.

== History ==
Foot School TV started test broadcasts on the ABS-1 and Eutelsat W1 satellites in November 2006, being financed by notable footballers and investment funds. The channel launched with eight audio tracks, English, Russian, German, French, Spanish, Portuguese, Italian and Arabic. In early 2008, the channel launched on linear IPTV providers in France, replacing the former linear TFOU channel, which moved entirely online.

In December 2008, Flor Latina Entertainment was put in charge of the distribution of its content in Latin America.
