= List of French films of 1985 =

A list of films produced in France in 1985.

French films released in 1985
Title	Director	Cast	Genre	Notes
Adieu Blaireau	Bob Decout	Philippe Léotard, Annie Girardot, Juliette Binoche	Crime	
Adieu Bonaparte	Youssef Chahine	Michel Piccoli, Patrice Chéreau, Christian Patey	Historical film	French–Egyptian co-production
A.K	Chris Marker	Robert Kramer, Akira Kurosawa	Documentary	
Asterix Versus Caesar	Gaëtan Brizzi, Paul Brizzi		Animated	
Chicken with Vinegar	Claude Chabrol	Jean Poiret, Stéphane Audran, Michel Bouquet	Mystery	
Dawn	Miklós Jancsó	—N/a	—N/a	
Death in a French Garden	Michel Deville	Christophe Malavoy, Nicole Garcia, Michel Piccoli	Thriller	
Détective	Jean-Luc Godard	—N/a	—N/a	
Gwen, or the Book of Sand	Jean-François Laguionie		Animation	
Hail Mary	Jean-Luc Godard	Myriem Roussel, Thierry Rode, Philippe Lacoste	Avant-garde, drama	French–Swiss–British co-production
Harem	Arthur Joffé	Nastassja Kinski, Ben Kingsley, Dennis Goldson	Drama	
Hell Train	Roger Hanin	Roger Hanin, Gérard Klein, Christine Pascal	Crime	
Hold-Up	Alexandre Arcady	Jean-Paul Belmondo, Kim Cattrall, Guy Marchand	Comedy, crime	French–Canadian co-production
Honeymoon	Patrick Jamain	Nathalie Baye, John Shea, Richard Berry	Thriller	French–Canadian co-production
Hurlevent	Jacques Rivette	Fabienne Babe, Lucas Belvaux, Olivier Cruveiller	Drama, romance	
An Impudent Girl	Claude Miller	Charlotte Gainsbourg, Bernadette Lafont, Jean-Claude Brialy	Comedy-drama	
L'amour braque	Andrzej Żuławski	Francis Huster, Sophie Marceau, Tchéky Karyo	Drama, romance	
La Cage aux Folles 3: The Wedding	Georges Lautner	Michel Serrault, Ugo Tognazzi, Antonella Interlenghi	Comedy	French–Italian co-production
La Vie de famille	Jacques Doillon	Sami Frey, Mara Goyet, Juliet Berto	Comedy-drama	
Leave All Fair	John Reid	John Gielgud, Jane Birkin, Féodor Atkine, Simon Ward	Drama	NZ-French co-production
Les Rois du gag	Claude Zidi	Macha Méril, Didier Kaminka	Comedy	
Les Spécialistes	Patrice Leconte	Bernard Giraudeau, Gérard Lanvin, Christiane Jean	Crime	
Manoel's Destinies	Raúl Ruiz	—N/a	—N/a	
Monsieur de Pourceaugnac	Michel Mitrani	Michel Galabru, Roger Coggio, Fanny Cottençon	Comedy	
The Mystery of Alexina	René Féret	Phillippe Vuillemin, Véronique Silver, Bernard Freyd	Drama	
November Moon	Alexandra von Grote	Maria Krasna, Gabriele Osburg, Christiane Millet	Drama, romance	West German–French co-production
On ne meurt que deux fois	Jacques Deray	Michel Serrault, Charlotte Rampling, Xavier Deluc	Thriller	
Parking	Jacques Demy	Francis Huster, Keïko Ito, Laurent Malet	Drama, fantasy	
Parole de flic	José Pinheiro	Alain Delon, Jacques Perrin, Fiona Gélin	Action	
Partir, revenir	Claude Lelouch	Annie Girardot, Jean-Louis Trintignant, Évelyne Bouix	Drama	
Police	Maurice Pialat	Gérard Depardieu, Sophie Marceau, Richard Anconina	Drama, action	
P.R.O.F.S.	Patrick Schulmann	Patrick Bruel, Fabrice Luchini, Laurent Gamelon	—N/a	
Ran	Akira Kurosawa	Tatsuya Nakadai, Akira Terao, Jinpachi Nezu	Epic	French–Japanese co-production
Red Kiss	Véra Belmont	Charlotte Valandrey, Lambert Wilson, Marthe Keller	—N/a	
Rendez-vous	André Téchiné	Juliette Binoche, Jean-Louis Trintignant, Wadeck Stanczak	Drama	
Scout toujours	Gérard Jugnot	Gérard Jugnot, Jean-Claude Leguay, Jean Rougerie	Comedy	Set in 1965.
Shoah	Claude Lanzmann		Documentary	
Subway	Luc Besson	Isabelle Adjani, Christopher Lambert, Jean-Pierre Bacri	Thriller	
Tea in the Harem	Mehdi Charef	—N/a	—N/a	
Three Men and a Cradle	Coline Serreau	André Dussollier, Roland Giraud, Michel Boujenah	Comedy	
Vagabond	Agnès Varda	Sandrine Bonnaire, Macha Méril, Stéphane Freiss	Drama	
