= TV7 Bordeaux =

Local TV channel in Bordeaux, France

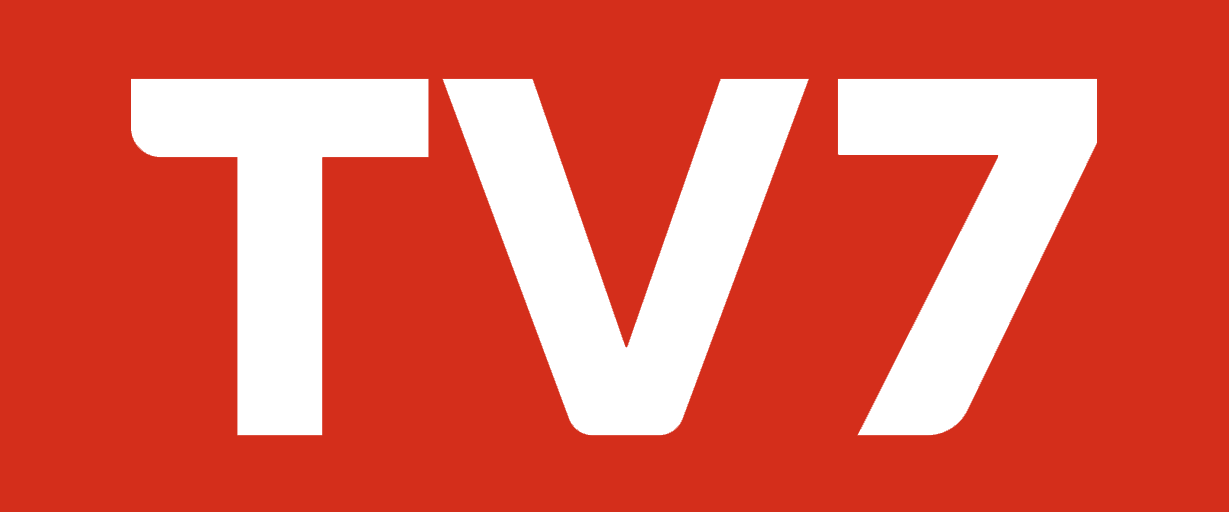
- Country: France
- Broadcast area: Bordeaux

Programming
- Language: French

Ownership
- Owner: Groupe Sud Ouest

History
- Launched: June 2001

Links
- Website: http://www.tv7.com

TV7 Bordeaux is a local television channel in Bordeaux, France.

The TV7 channel was founded on June 7, 2001, by the Sud Ouest Group. The studios have been situated in the core of the Group's newsrooms on Quai de Queyries in Bordeaux since 2017.
