= TPS Foot =

- Country: France
- Broadcast area: France
- Network: TPS
- Headquarters: Issy-les-Moulineaux, France

Programming
- Picture format: 576i (4:3 SDTV)

Ownership
- Owner: Télévision Par Satellite (2001-2007); Canal+ Group (2007)

History
- Launched: 13 August 2005; 19 years ago
- Closed: 31 December 2007; 17 years ago

TPS Foot was a French sports channel that was dedicated to airing football matches and was owned by French satellite provider TPS.

The channel began its programs on 13 August 2005 via the TPS package and on certain cable networks. TPS Foot stopped its live broadcast on 31 December 2007.

== Programming ==
TPS Foot featured football matches from all the top leagues and competitions including:

- FA Premier League (0 live games)
- Bundesliga (German 1st Division) along with TPS Star
- Serie A (1 or 2 live games per week) along with TPS Star
- La Liga (Spanish 1st Division) (1 live game per week)
- Football League Championship (English 2nd Division)
- UEFA Cup
- UEFA Champions League
- International friendlies
- Copa Libertadores

TPS Foot also aired programming from Barça TV, Chelsea TV, MUTV and Real Madrid TV.

Other than that, TPS Foot showed both the preview and review for the Bundesliga and the FA Premier League.
