= List of French films of 1986 =

A list of films produced in France in 1986.

French films released in 1986
Title	Director	Cast	Genre	Notes
Asterix in Britain	Pino van Lamsweerde		Adventure, comedy	French–Danish co-production
Betty Blue	Jean-Jacques Beineix	Béatrice Dalle, Jean-Hugues Anglade, Consuelo de Haviland	Drama	
Les Exploits d'un jeune Don Juan	Gianfranco Mingozzi	Fabrice Josso, Claudine Auger, Serena Grandi	—N/a	French–Italian co-production
Ginger and Fred	Federico Fellini	Marcello Mastroianni, Giulietta Masina, Franco Fabrizi	Comedy-drama	Italian–French–West German co-production
The Green Ray	Éric Rohmer	Marie Rivière, Rosette, Béatrice Romand	Drama	
Hôtel du Paradis	Jana Boková	Fernando Rey, Fabrice Luchini, Hugues Quester	Drama	French–British co-production
I Love You	Marco Ferreri	Anémone, Eddy Mitchell, Christopher Lambert	Comedy drama	French–Italian co-production
Jean de Florette	Claude Berri	Yves Montand, Daniel Auteuil, Gérard Depardieu	—N/a	
Kamikaze	Didier Grousset	Michel Galabru, Richard Bohringer, Dominique Lavanant	Thriller, science fiction	
Le couteau sous la gorge	Claude Mulot	Florence Guérin, Alexandre Sterling	Crime	
Les Fugitifs	Francis Veber	Gérard Depardieu, Pierre Richard, Anaïs Bret	Comedy	
A Man and a Woman: 20 Years Later	Claude Lelouch	Anouk Aimée, Jean-Louis Trintignant, Évelyne Bouix	Drama	
Manon des Sources	Claude Berri	Yves Montand, Daniel Auteuil, Emmanuelle Béart	Drama	
Mauvais Sang	Léos Carax	Denis Lavant, Michel Piccoli, Juliette Binoche	Crime, romance	
Max mon amour	Nagisa Oshima	Charlotte Rampling, Anthony Higgins, Diana Quick	—N/a	
Ménage	Bertrand Blier	Gérard Depardieu, Michel Blanc, Miou-Miou	Comedy	
My Brother-in-Law Killed My Sister	Jacques Rouffio	Michel Serrault, Michel Piccoli, Juliette Binoche	Comedy	
The Name of the Rose	Jean-Jacques Annaud	Sean Connery, Christian Slater, Helmut Qualtinger	Mystery	West German–Italian–French co-production
Pirates	Roman Polanski	Walter Matthau, Damien Thomas, Richard Pearson	Adventure	French–Tunisian co-production
Round Midnight	Bertrand Tavernier	Dexter Gordon, François Cluzet, Sandra Reaves-Phillip	Drama	French–American co-production
The Sacrifice	Andrei Tarkovsky	Erland Josephson, Susan Fleetwood, Allan Edwall	Drama	Swedish–French co-production
Salomè	Claude d'Anna	Jo Champa, Fabrizio Bentivoglio	Drama	
Sarraounia	Med Hondo	Aï Keïta, Jean-Roger Milo, Féodor Atkine	—N/a	French–Burkina Faso co-production
Scene of the Crime	André Téchiné	Catherine Deneuve, Wadeck Stanczak, Nicolas Giraudi	Drama	
Terminus	Pierre-William Glenn	Johnny Hallyday	Adventure	
Twist again à Moscou	Jean-Marie Poiré	Philippe Noiret, Christian Clavier, Martin Lamotte	Comedy	
