= List of French films of 1983 =

A list of films produced in France in 1983.

French films released in 1983
Title	Director	Cast	Genre	Notes
2019, After the Fall of New York	Sergio Martino	Michael Sopkiw, Valentine Monnier, Anna Kanakis	Science fiction, action	Italian–French co-production
À Nos Amours	Maurice Pialat	Sandrine Bonnaire, Maurice Pialat, Dominique Besnehard	Drama	
A Good Little Devil	Jean-Claude Brialy	Alice Sapritch, Bernadette Lafont, Philippe Clay, Michel Creton	Drama	
And the Ship Sails On	Federico Fellini	Freddie Jones, Barbara Jefford, Victor Poletti	Comedy	Italian–French co-production
L'Argent	Robert Bresson	Christian Patey, Sylvie van den Elsen, Michel Briguet	Drama	French–Swiss co-production
Le Bal	Ettore Scola	Etienne Guichard, Régis Bouquet, Francesco de Rosa	Musical	French–Italian–Algerian co-production
La Belle captive	Alain Robbe-Grillet	Daniel Mesguich, Gabrielle Lazure, Cyrielle Claire	Avant-garde	
Cap Canaille	Juliet Berto, Jean-Henri Roger	Richard Bohringer, Jean-Claude Brialy, Juliet Berto	Crime, thriller	French–Belgian co-production
Les Compères	Francis Verber	Pierre Richard, Gérard Depardieu, Anny Duperey	Comedy	
Confidentially Yours	François Truffaut	Fanny Ardant, Jean-Louis Trintignant, Philippe Laudenbach	Mystery	
Danton	Andrzej Wajda	Gérard Depardieu, Wojciech Pszoniak, Patrice Chéreau	Drama	French–Polish co-production
Deadly Circuit	Claude Miller	Michel Serrault, Isabelle Adjani, Geneviève Page	Thriller	
The Death of Mario Ricci	Claude Goretta	Gian Maria Volonté, Magali Noël, Heinz Bennent	Drama	Swiss–French–West German co-production
Le Dernier Combat	Luc Besson	Pierre Jolivet, Jean Bouise, Jean Reno	Science fiction	
Entre Nous	Diane Kurys	Miou-Miou, Isabelle Huppert, Guy Marchand	Drama	
Équateur	Serge Gainsbourg	Barbara Sukowa, Francis Huster, René Kolldehoff	Crime, Romance, Thriller	
Eréndira	Ruy Guerra	Irene Papas, Cláudia Ohana, Oliver Wehe		Mexican–French–West German co-production
First Name: Carmen	Jean-Luc Godard	Maruschka Detmers, Jacques Bonnaffé, Myriem Roussel	Avant-garde	
Ironmaster	Umberto Lenzi	Sam Pasco, George Eastman, Elvire Audrey	—N/a	Italian–French co-production
The Man in the Silk Hat	Maud Linder		Documentary	
Le Marginal	Jacques Deray	Jean-Paul Belmondo, Henry Silva, Claude Brosset	Action, thriller	
Liberty Belle	Pascal Kané	Jerome Zucca, Dominique Laffin, André Dussollier	Drama	
Life Is a Bed of Roses	Alain Resnais	Vittorio Gassman, Ruggero Raimondi, Fanny Ardant	Comedy drama	
La matiouette ou l'arrière-pays	André Téchiné	Jacques Nolot, Patrick Fierry		
Moon in the Gutter	Jean-Jacques Beineix	Gérard Depardieu, Nastassja Kinski, Victoria Abril	Drama, mystery	French–Italian co-production
News Items	Raymond Depardon		Documentary	
One Deadly Summer	Jean Becker	Isabelle Adjani, Alain Souchon, Suzanne Flon	Drama	
Pauline at the Beach	Éric Rohmer	Amanda Langlet, Arielle Dombasle, Pascal Greggory	Comedy drama	
The Ruffian	José Giovanni	Lino Ventura, Bernard Giraudeau, Claudia Cardinale	Adventure	
S.A.S. à San Salvador	Raoul Coutard	Miles O'Keeffe, Sybil Danning, Raimund Harmstorf	Action, thriller	French–West German co-production
Sans Soleil	Chris Marker		Documentary	
So Long, Stooge	Claude Berri	Coluche, Richard Anconina, Agnès Soral	Drama	
Sugar Cane Alley	Euzhan Palcy	Garry Cadenat, Darling Légitimus, Douta Seck	Drama	
Three Crowns of the Sailor	Raúl Ruiz	Jean-Bernard Guillard, Philippe Deplanche, Jean Badin	Fantasy	
The Wounded Man	Patrice Chéreau	Jean-Hugues Anglade, Vittorio Mezzogiorno, Roland Bertin	Drama	
