= Tide of Life =

- Genre: Drama,
- Written by: Nicolas Cohen
- Starring: Claude Jade; Paul Barge; Raphaël Baudoin; Mélanie Maudran; Dora Doll
- Ending theme: Contre vents et marées, sung by Françoise Hardy
- Country of origin: France
- Original language: French
- No. of episodes: 281

Original release
- Release: 14 September 1998 – March 31, 2000

Tide of Life ("Cap des Pins") is the first French French television soap opera that is released every week-day. (1998–2000).

starring: Paul Barge (Gérard Chantreuil), Claude Jade (Anna Chantreuil), Raphaël Baudoin (Brice Chantreuil), Mélanie Maudran (Louise Chantreuil), Dora Doll (Agathe Chantreuil).

Set in a small village in Brittany, and focusing on the activities at a health resort, led by Gérard Chantreuil. Tide Of Life incorporates all of the traditional soap ingredients – villains, unrequited love, ambition, murder and money. A new approach to all of those elements allows The Tide Of Life to explore stories that would have been considered taboo 10 years ago. The series focuses on the Chantreuil family and three local families entangled in a web of power, money and passion. The title song, "Contre vents et marées", is written by Eric Clapton and sung by Françoise Hardy.

== About the series ==
During its first season in September 1998, the series, broadcast at 6pm, struggled to establish itself1. By airing earlier in the afternoon, it ended up attracting almost 1.5 million viewers. The second season underwent a number of upheavals and a change of schedule, ending in March 2000.

Claude Jade wrote in her autobiography Baisers envolés: "With the change in management at France 2, it was decided to abandon Cap des Pins, which ended up in the doldrums. By giving pride of place to the stories of teenagers, sometimes to the detriment of other characters, and by multiplying the roles, did the scriptwriters lose the thread of the action and forget the initial purpose? Viewers, who had missed an episode, may have had difficulty understanding the plot, to which the writers' imagination brought unexpected twists and turns, but when the broadcast of Cap des Pins ended, many of them wrote to the channel to ask for a sequel. In my opinion, this adventure was a bit of a missed opportunity, and that's a shame, because there was plenty of material for a real, high-quality French soap opera. All the actors gave the best of themselves and were, I think, happy to work together; the audience sensed that. I was disappointed to stop filming, but I was also happy to have a breather. I wanted to move on to something completely different."
