= List of French films of 1998 =

A list of films produced in France in 1998.

| Title | Director | Cast | Genre | Notes |
|---|---|---|---|---|
| Alice et Martin | André Téchiné | Juliette Binoche, Mathieu Amalric, Carmen Maura | Drama | |
| Une chance sur deux | Patrice Leconte | Jean-Paul Belmondo, Alain Delon, Vanessa Paradis | Action comedy | |
| Le Dîner de Cons | Francis Veber | Jacques Villeret | Comedy | Won 3 César & 2 Lumiere Awards, +4 nom. |
| The Dreamlife of Angels | Erick Zonca | Élodie Bouchez, Natacha Régnier | Drama | Nomin. for Golden Palm, +14 wins, +9 nom. |
| The Eleventh Child (Nguol thùa) | Dai Sijie | | Drama | |
| L'ennui | Cédric Kahn | Charles Berling, Sophie Guillemin | Drama | |
| For Sale | Laetitia Masson | Sandrine Kiberlain | | Screened at the 1998 Cannes Film Festival |
| L'inconnu de Strasbourg | Valeria Sarmiento | Ornella Muti, Charles Berling | Thriller | |
| I Stand Alone | Gaspar Noé | Philippe Nahon | Thriller drama | 5 wins & 5 nominations |
| Killer | Darezhan Omirbayev | Talgat Assetov | Crime drama | |
| Kirikou and the Sorceress | Michel Ocelot | Doudou Gueye Thiaw, Maimouna N'Diaye, Awa Sène Sarr | Animation | 11 wins & 1 nomination |
| Lautrec | Roger Planchon | Régis Royer, Elsa Zylberstein, Anémone, Claude Rich | Biographical | 3 wins & 3 nominations |
| Louise (Take 2) | Siegfried | Élodie Bouchez | Drama | Screened at the 1998 Cannes Film Festival |
| The Perfect Guy | Olivier Ducastel, Jacques Martineau | Virginie Ledoyen, Mathieu Demy | Musical | Entered into the 48th Berlin International Film Festival |
| Place Vendôme | Nicole Garcia | Catherine Deneuve | Crime drama | 1 win & 13 nominations |
| Riches, belles, etc. | Bunny Schpoliansky | Lola Naymark, Claudia Cardinale, Marisa Berenson | Comedy | |
| The School of Flesh | Benoît Jacquot | Isabelle Huppert | | Entered into the 1998 Cannes Film Festival |
| Sitcom | François Ozon | | Dark Comedy | 3 wins & 3 nominations |
| Sombre | Philippe Grandrieux | Marc Barbé, Elina Löwensohn | Drama | 1 win & 1 nomination |
| Taxi | Gérard Pirès | Samy Naceri | Action comedy | 3 wins & 5 nominations |
| Tell Me I'm Dreaming | Claude Mouriéras | | | Screened at the 1998 Cannes Film Festival |
| Those Who Love Me Can Take the Train | Patrice Chéreau | Pascal Greggory | Drama | Entered into the 1998 Cannes Film Festival |
| Too Much (Little) Love | Jacques Doillon | Lou Doillon | Comedy | Entered into the 48th Berlin International Film Festival |
| Train of Life | Radu Mihăileanu | Lionel Abelanski, Rufus | Romance / War | 9 wins & 4 nominations |
| Les Visiteurs II | Jean-Marie Poiré | Jean Reno, Christian Clavier | Fantasy / Comedy | |
| War in the Highlands | Francis Reusser | Marion Cotillard, Yann Trégouët, François Marthouret | Drama / War | Screened at the 1999 Berlin Film Festival |
