= Magazine féminin =

French television show

- Directed by: Aimé Chabrerie
- Presented by: Maïté Célérier de Sannois
- Country of origin: France
- Original language: French
- No. of seasons: 18

Production
- Camera setup: Multi-camera
- Running time: 22–24 minutes

Original release
- Network: RTF
- Release: 3 May 1952 – 2 February 1970

Magazine féminin is a French television show that aired for female audiences on RTF from 21 April 1952 to 2 February 1970. It was presented by Marie Claire's editor, Maïté Célérier de Sannois.

== Premise ==
The show dealt with traditional homemaking pursuits such as sewing and cooking for housewives, supported with illustrated images. Magazine féminin was one of few television shows exclusively aimed at women in France in the 1960s (the other being Dim Dam Dom, which aimed you a younger demographic as opposed to housewives).
