= Mardi Cinéma =

French television show

- Presented by: Pierre Tchernia; Jacques Rouland
- Country of origin: France
- Original language: French

Production
- Running time: 30 minutes

Original release
- Release: January 12, 1982 – 1988

Mardi Cinéma is a French television show and game show devoted to cinema, created and presented by Pierre Tchernia and Jacques Rouland.

== Premise ==
After the screening of the film of the first part of the evening, Pierre Tchernia and Jacques Rouland receive live from the Théâtre de l'Empire, then from the Cognac-Jay studios, two actors and offer reports and trailers. During the show, two teams of people, would answer questions relating to the film, with the help of the guests of the show.

== Revival ==
The show was revived with Laurent Ruquier presenting the show in 2016. The show was cancelled due to low ratings.
