= Discorama =

French television program

- Presented by: Georges de Caunes; Claude Darget; Jean Desailly; Pierre Tchernia; Philippe Noiret; Jean-Pierre Darras; Denise Glaser
- Country of origin: France
- Original language: French

Production
- Camera setup: Multi-camera
- Running time: 50 minutes

Original release
- Network: RTF
- Release: February 4, 1959 – January 5, 1975

Discorama is a French musical television show, created and presented by Denise Glaser and broadcast from 1959 - 1975 on RTF.
