= Dimanche Martin =

French television show

- Presented by: Jacques Martin
- Country of origin: France
- Original language: French

Production
- Running time: 30 minutes

Original release
- Network: France 2
- Release: December 21, 1980 – June 21, 1998

Dimanche Martin is a French variety show created and presented by Jacques Martin from 1980 to 1998 on Antenne 2. At its peak it achieved 72% viewership in 1983.
