= Télé-Philatélie =

- Created by: Jacqueline Caurat
- Country of origin: France
- Original language: French

Production
- Camera setup: Multi-camera
- Running time: 30 minutes

Original release
- Network: TF1
- Release: 5 April 1961 – 11 May 1983

Télé-Philatélie, was a 30-minute French television program devoted to philately and broadcast from 1961 to 1983.

Jacqueline Caurat presented the show with Lucien Berthelot and produced it.
