= Sous le soleil =

French soap opera

- Created by: Olivier Brémond and Pascal Breton
- Starring: Bénédicte Delmas; Adeline Blondieau; Tonya Kinzinger
- Country of origin: France
- No. of episodes: 480

Production
- Running time: 60 minutes

Original release
- Network: TF1
- Release: 13 March 1996 – 20 December 2008

Sous le soleil (Under the sun; French pronunciation: [su lə sɔ.lɛj]) is a French soap opera broadcast on French major channel TF1 from 1996 to 2008. A spin-off, Sous le soleil de Saint-Tropez has been broadcast in French channel TMC since 2013.

== Broadcast ==
It has been a success in many countries, particularly in Latin America, France, Belgium, Bulgaria, Switzerland, Italy, Slovakia, Russia, Turkey and Poland. In different times it was also shown in Hungary, Ukraine, Lebanon, Azerbaijan, Georgia, Greece, Estonia, Finland, Sweden, Denmark, Mexico, Bosnia and Herzegovina, Serbia, USA and many other countries. In Serbia, the show has been on air continuously since 1998 on several different channels; as of 2009, the show is being syndicated in its entirety on several local television channels. In Montenegro (as well as in Serbia through cable), new episodes are being shown on Atlas TV.

== Plot and characters ==
The plot focuses on the lives and romances of Laure, Caroline and Jessica, three young women living in Saint-Tropez, on the French Riviera. Laure is a sensitive woman working as a doctor in a hospital of Saint-Tropez. Caroline is a willful and smart woman who works hard to make it as a singer and a lawyer. Jessica is a beautiful American blonde who works as a bartender, model, and dancer.

== Cast ==
- Bénédicte Delmas as Laure Olivier (243 episodes)
- Adeline Blondieau as Caroline Drancourt (207 episodes)
- Tonya Kinzinger as Jessica Lowry (344 Episodes)
- Marie-Christine Adam as Blandine Olivier (150 Episodes)
- Grégory Fitoussi as Benjamin (62 Episodes)
- Lucie Jeanne as Victoria (34 Episodes)
- Arnaud Binard as Manu (18 Episodes)
- Claude Gensac as Aunt Clarissa (4 Episodes)
- Yoann Sover as Fabrice (season 6)

== Guest ==
- Agnès Soral as Lise Hamon
- Alice Pol as Chloé
- Babsie Steger as Sylviane
- Delphine Chanéac as Charlotte Lacroix
- Jean Dell as Lawyer Belgrand
- Lucien Jean-Baptiste as Bob Robin

== Music ==
The Sous Le Soleil (Theme Song) is by Avy Marciano.

== See also ==
- List of French television series
