= 30 millions d'amis =

- Created by: Jean-Pierre Hutin
- Narrated by: Sylvie Bariol; Didier Gircourt
- Theme music composer: Jack Arel; Henri Garella
- Country of origin: France
- No. of seasons: 39

Production
- Running time: 25 minutes (1976–2014); 45 minutes (2014–15)
- Production company: Pro TV

Original release
- Release: 6 January 1976 – 1 June 2016

30 millions d'amis (English: "30 Million Friends") is a French television program, a French monthly magazine with its posters, and a French foundation: the Fondation 30 Millions d'Amis. All three focus on pets, especially cats, dogs, horses, ferrets, rabbits, guinea pigs, rats, hamsters, mice, canaries, parakeets, parrots, terrarium reptiles, goldfish, aquarium fish, and other exotic pets, but also wild animals like for example, bonobos and cheetahs.

== Television program ==
The first episode of the program, initiative of the French journalist Jean-Pierre Hutin, who was worried about the fate of pets, was broadcast on 6 January 1976 on TF1. It is one of the television programs that has the fifth-longest longevity of the French audiovisual field, after Des chiffres et des lettres, Automoto, Thalassa and Stade 2. The music of the title sequence was composed by Jack Arel.

The program was ended by the channel on 27 December 2003 and was transferred on 6 March 2004 on France 2. It was then broadcast since 10 September 2006 on France 3. Since 27 April 2004, the program was expanded of 20 minutes and started in September of that year its 39th season. In 2015, the program got back its initial length of 25 minutes. The voices of the program were Sylvie Bariol and Didier Gircourt.

The director of France 3 announced on 8 January 2016 on Europe 1 that after 40 years of existence, the program would definitely end in June 2016. A petition was published online on the official site, the Fondation 30 Millions d'Amis, to fight against the decision of the channel.

== Magazine ==
30 millions d'amis
- Frequency: Monthly
- Founded: 1978
- Company: Télé-Animaux
- Country: France
- Language: French
- Website: www.30millionsdamis.fr

The magazine was created in 1978. In 2001, while the magazine reached 85,000 copies with 48,000 subscribers and 36,000 sales in newsstands, Empa France sells it back to the French media group Aniwa, founded by Bernardo Gallitelli, where the main stockholder is the animal food maker Royal Canin. Aniwa also recovers the rights to use the brand on both paper and Internet.

In January 2005, Bernardo Gallitelli left Aniwa while in restructuration and buys back the magazine to create the media group Télé-Animaux, and where the subsidiary company Buena Média Plus publishes through 30 Millions d'Amis, as well as other animal magazines like L'Essentiel, Petmarket, Lignées, Pharmanimal and Vet Focus. In 2013, the magazine launches its numerical version on pad and Smartphone (IOS and android). In 2014, the total broadcast of the magazine reached over 73,000 copies with 70% of subscribers. It is largely the leader of the animal media in France.

== Foundation ==
30 millions d'amis
- Founded: 1995
- Founder: Jean-Pierre Hutin
- Purpose: Animal welfare
- Location: Paris, France
- Website: www.30millionsdamis.fr

The Fondation 30 Millions d'Amis was created in 1995 by Jean-Pierre Hutin, who became the president. At his death on 1 June 1996, his wife Reha Hutin replaced him for the presidency of the foundation. The objective is to battle any kind of animal sufferance. For this, it uses various forms of action: help, struggle, pedagogy, as well as the encouragements through prizes and visas.

=== Help to animals ===
The help concerns any animal in difficulty, whatever it is mistreated, abandoned or wandering. It often takes form of a financial support in favor of different refuges but also bearing the cost of veterinary expenses.

=== Struggle ===
The foundation is opposed to all activity that engenders sufferance to animals. Since then, it is implicated with other foundations, at the abolition of hunting and corrida, ending animal trafficking, the use of fur as well as the animal experimentation. It also watches over the life conditions of the farm animals.

To reinforce its action, it has the judicial possibility to file a complaint against any person or organism breaking the laws but also to be the civil part at lawsuits. In parallel, it incites at the evolution of the judicial status of the animal in order to ease the protection. In addition, it often demands the support of the public opinion, via petitions, in order to reinforce the impact of its opinions.

Its actions are not limited to France. Indeed, the foundation expands itself on all continents and all fields. Massacres of Eastern dogs and elephants in Africa, martyrized bears in China, protection of monkeys in South America are some examples of its international implication.

=== Pedagogy ===
The foundation frequently organizes campaigns of sensitization about different themes like mistreating and abandoning. In parallel, it favors any action that permits the presence of animals to fragilized persons like blind or handicapped people, children in psychological difficulty or persons in institution.

== Rewards ==
The objective of the rewards is to honor the initiatives that put the animals in value, by defending them and/or watching over their good living. Two prizes exist until now, one concerns the literary field and the other the municipalities. The foundation also delivers a visa to film productions who respect the characteristics of animal good when these are used.

=== Literary prize ===
Since 1982, the foundation delivers every year a literary prize to a novel or an essay who has honored the animals. The laureate must then give the amount of the prize to the foundation of their choice.

=== Ruban d'honneur ===
Created in 2008, this prize has for vocation to honor the municipalities which the engagement in favor of the animals have been particularly remarkable.

=== Visa 30 Millions d'Amis ===
This visa appeared in 1995. It attests of the good treating of the animals during the filming. Thus the film The Fox and the Child has beneficiated of this visa.

== Mascots ==
The television program has had several successive mascots who have always been dogs owned by Jean-Pierre Hutin and his wife Reha Hutin. These mascots, all German Shepherds, have been in order, Mabrouk, Mabrouk Junior and Mabrouka.

== See also ==
- Pet
- Guide dog
- Animal-assisted therapy
- Blood sport
- Animal testing
- Fur
- Fondation Brigitte Bardot
- People for the Ethical Treatment of Animals
- Animal welfare
