= Présence protestante =

- Genre: Religious broadcasting
- Created by: Marcel Gosselin
- Country of origin: France
- Original language: Italian

Production
- Running time: 30 minutes

Original release
- Network: France 2
- Release: 2 October 1955 – present

Présence protestante is a France 2 religious programme that presents Protestant Christianity. It has been produced since the 1950s broadcast every Sunday morning since October 9, 1955.

== History ==
Présence protestante debuted on October 2, 1955 which was presented by Marcel Gosselin, under the leadership of Marc Boegner who was the president of the Protestant Federation of France. Broadcast by RTF, it was originally titled Émission protestante, then renamed to Présence protestante after a similar French-speaking Swiss program. The show was presented by Marcel Gosselin, who was replaced by Jean Doman in 1980.

Présence protestante deals with theology on French television from a Protestant perspective.

In 1961, the Protestant clergy made an agreement that meant that Présence protestante was afforded 1 hour broadcasting time on Easter and Christmas.

Since the privatisation of French television channels in 1986, religious programs are broadcast on Antenne 2 (now France 2).
