= Le Jour du Seigneur =

- Also known as: L'Emission religieuse
- Genre: Religious broadcasting
- Created by: Raymond Pichard
- Country of origin: France
- Original language: French

Production
- Running time: 90 minutes
- Production company: Comité français de radio-télévision

Original release
- Network: France 2
- Release: 9 October 1949 – present

Le Jour du Seigneur (English: The Lord's Day) is a France 2 religious programme that presents Christianity, usually broadcasting Catholic mass and services, amongst other things related to religion. It was the first broadcast Vatican Catholic mass and is the longest running French television show. The show was first broadcast in October 1949, an overall total of 73 years, one of the highest lengths ever for a TV show. The show was originally called L'Emission religieuse (The Religious Show) and later renamed Le Jour du Seigneur in 1954. The show has experienced a significant drop of television viewers over the span of several decades due to the decline of religious observance, and overall decline in rates of Christianity.
