= List of French television series =

This is a list of television programs that have been produced by France. It includes series made by France alone as well as those produced in collaboration with various other countries. Almost all are in the French language; exceptions to this rule are also included in this list.

Most of the programs on this list are original French creations. However, many French game shows and reality shows are based on one or more series or television show franchises from other countries, most commonly from the UK. These and other programs that have been remade in France are also included in another section, at the bottom of this article.

Jean-Marc Doniak has documented all the French fiction series that have been programmed on French television in 2 volumes published in 1998: Volume 1 with 15,000 titles and covering the years 1945–1990 and Volume 2 with 5,000 titles and covering the years 1991–1996.

== Original French programs ==
=== Action-drama ===
Original title in France	English title (or literal meaning)	Year	Country of origin	Original language	Summary
Reporters	N/A	2007–2009	France; Belgium	French	In the competitive field of journalism, television and newspaper reporters face diverse challenges and dangers while pursuing the truth and trying to keep the public interested.

=== Children's series (non-animated) ===
Original title in France	English title (or literal meaning)	Year	Country of origin	Original language	Summary
Belle et Sébastien	Belle and Sebastian	1965–1968	France	French	After his Romani mother dies giving birth to him, Sébastien is raised by an old shepherd along with his own two grandchildren. When Sébastien is six years old, he meets Belle, a white Pyrenean mountain dog. They become inseparable and have many adventures together. Cécile Aubry wrote and directed the series, which she based on her novel Belle et Sébastien. Her son, Mehdi El Glaoui, plays Sébastien. Two series followed, titled Sébastien parmi les hommes and Sébastien et la Mary-Morgane.
La Baie des fugitifs	Runaway Bay	1992–1993	France; United Kingdom; United States	English	A group of children have adventures on the Caribbean island of Martinique.
Barnèy et Ses Amis	Barney & Friends.	1992–2009	France; United States	English	Children loves Barney, a purple loving-hugging Dinosaur in the world.
Tèlètubbiès	Teletubbies.	1997–2001 and 2015–present	France; United Kingdom	English	Teletubbies are wonderful place called Teletubbyland.
Bob le Bricoleur	Bob the Builder.	1998–2015 and 2015–present	France; United Kingdom; United States	English	Bob and the gang who working hard together.

=== Comedy ===
==== Comedy ====
Original title in France	English title (or literal meaning)	Year	Country of origin	Original language	Summary
Des soucis et des hommes	Partners, Fathers, Lovers (lit. Worries and men)	2012	France	French	Also known in English as Partners, Fathers and Lovers.
Fais pas ci, fais pas ça	Desperate Parents (lit. Don't do this, Don't do that)	2007–2017	France	French	Two couples, the free spirited Bouleys and the conservative-authoritarian Lepics, agree to star in a reality program along with their children. The focus is mainly on the differences between how both sets of parents raise their children and how the children differ from their parents expectations. The first season is a mockumentary/pretend reality show. From the second season on all documentary aspects are discarded and the two families have become next-door neighbors.
Kaboul Kitchen	(lit. Kabul Kitchen)	2012–present	France	French	The series is based on the true story of Radio France Internationale journalist Marc Victor, who ran a restaurant for French expatriates in Kabul until 2008.
Nos enfants chéris	(lit. Our precious children)	2007–2008	France	French	The series follows the 2003 French film of the same name in which childhood sweethearts Constance and Martin, both married with children, reunite and leave their spouses for each other. The series begins three years later as the new couple, with their respective children, leave for a relaxing vacation at Martin's parents' house. Once there, their rest is constantly interrupted by family, friends and exes.
Vive la colo !	(lit. Long live the colony !)	2012–2013	France	French	Thirty-five-year-old Morgane has just broken up with her significant other and her father has been hospitalized. She goes to fill in for her father as director of a summer camp for 10- to 14-year-olds.

==== Comedy-drama ====
Original title in France	English title (or literal meaning)	Year	Country of origin	Original language	Summary
Clash	N/A	2012	France	French	Six episodes of 52 minutes length following a group of adolescent friends. Each episode focuses on a different member of the group and examines their relationship with their parents and family.
Hard	N/A	2008–present	France	French	Retired lawyer, Sophie's spouse dies and she discovers that instead of running a successful software company, he actually ran a pornographic film company, which she has now inherited.
Une famille formidable	A Wonderful Family	1992–present	France	French	Follows the lives of the Beaumont family.
Victoire Bonnot	N/A (Title is main character's name.)	2010–2012	France	French	

==== Satire ====
Original title in France	English title (or literal meaning)	Year	Country of origin	Original language	Summary
Le Bébête Show		1982–1995	France	French	
Les Guignols de l'info	(lit. The Puppets of info)	1988–2018	France	French	Satirical news show with puppets.
C’est Canteloup		2011–2025	France	French	Satirical news commentary

==== Shortcom ====
Shortcom or programme court is a television program genre that is between sketch comedy and sitcom. Shortcom episodes typically range in length from one to seven minutes, though many shortcom series do include longer episodes. Un gars, une fille, based on the French-language Canadian series of the same name, began in 1999 and was the first shortcom series that was not a sequence in another series to air in France.

Original title in France	English title (or literal meaning)	Year	Country of origin	Original language	Summary
4 jeunes, 1 voiture	(lit. 4 young people, 1 car)	2013–2015	France	French	Djamel, Stéphanie, Patrick and Samuel are four young people who encounter comical situations while driving around together in the same car and taking turns at the wheel.
bref.	(lit. brief) The word is used in this case to mean something like, in brief, in short or anyway.	2011–2012	France	French	Episodes that are less than two minutes long follow an unnamed young man in his, often failed, attempts to better his love/sex life, career, housing situation, etc. Originally aired as a segment of Le Grand Journal series.
Caméra Café	(lit. Coffee Camera)	2001–2004	France	French	Series consisting of seven-minute episodes taking place in an office lunch room. All action is shot from the point of view of the coffee machine.
Kaamelott	N/A (Intentional misspelling of Camelot, which is spelt the same in both French and English.)	2004–2009	France	French	Medieval fantasy, comedy about the legendary King Arthur and his quest for the Holy Grail. The episodes range in duration from three and a half minutes to forty-four minutes, getting longer as the series progresses.
nos chers voisins	(lit. our dear neighbours)	2012–2017	France	French	Families with children, single people, partying roommates, old people... The life and neighbourhood relations of the inhabitants of a building located at 28, rue de la Source, who meet on the landing, in the hall, the courtyard or in the elevator. .
Objectif: Nul	(lit. Objective: None)	1987	France	French	With absolutely no mission to complete, Capitaine Lamar and his crew roam the cosmos in their spaceship, Libérator (lit. Liberator). Objectif: Nul is a spoof of popular sci-fi multimedia that was originally a segment of the series Nulle Part Ailleurs.
Pep's - Parents - Eleves - Profs.	(lit: Pep's - parents - students - teachers)	2013–2015	France	French	Whether you work there as a teacher, study there or drop off your children every morning, the school leaves no one indifferent. Depressive teachers, stressed parents and daydreamer students, Pep's plunges us into the daily life of this infernal triangle. In front of the gate, in the cafeteria, in the hallways or in the classrooms, relationships are intertwined for better and often for worse. .
Samantha oups!	(lit. Samantha oops!)	2004–2007	France	French	The daily lives of two young women, Samantha Lo and Chantal Matieu, played by two young male actors, David Strajmayster and Guillaume Carcaud.
Soda	(Anagram for Ados, lit. Teens or Teenagers.)	2011–present	France	French	Adam is a carefree teenager who spends most of his time having fun with his two friends and being bothered by his little sister.
Sophie et Sophie	(lit. Sophie and Sophie)	2012–2013	France	French	A spin-off of the 2012–present series, WorkinGirls, which is a French adaptation of the 2008–present Dutch series, Toren C. Sophie and Sophie are a pair of lazy receptionists who work in the same office and always wear matching uniforms. They are rude to the clients and constantly critical of their coworkers.

==== Sitcom ====
Original title in France	English title (or literal meaning)	Year	Country of origin	Original language	Summary
Blague à Part	(lit. Joke Aside), meaning all kidding aside.	1998–2003	France	French	A series depicting the daily lives of psychiatrist Isabelle and comedian Nicolas, a married couple and their friends.
H	N/A	1998–2002	France	French	A surrealistic comedy series about the daily lives of the wacky staff and interns at a hospital in a Paris suburb.
Hélène et les garçons	(lit. Hélène and the Boys)	1992–1994	France	French	Hélène et les Garçons is a spin-off of Premiers Baisers. The romantic adventures begin when college student Hélène Girard, played by French singer Hélène Rollès, and her roommates Cathy and Johanna meet three male college roommates.
Jamais deux sans toi...t	(lit. Never two without you/roof)	1996–1997	France	French	Thomas Dubreuil inherits an apartment in Paris from his recently deceased father. When he goes to move in, he finds Valentine Léger, a young woman who is already living there. It turns out that his father co-owned the apartment with his secret lover and that Valentine is her daughter, from a previous relationship. As co-inheritor, Valentine refuses to sell Thomas her half and they agree to live together in the apartment.
La Croisière foll'amour	(lit. The crazy love Cruise) The ship's name is Foll'amour (lit. Crazy Love).	1995–1997	France	French	The sequel to Salut les Musclés. Now the musical band, Les Musclés, and their friends have moved out of their apartment and are running cruises on their new ship, Foll'amour. They are joined by Estrella, the sister of their extraterrestrial friend, Hilguegue. She has come to earth to learn about humans. Their romantic adventures continue.
La Famille Guérin	(lit. The Guérin Family)	2002	France	French	In the Guérin family, Ludivine is the only reasonable one. Her brother Stanislas is obsessed with money, her mother is self-obsessed and her father hasn't a clue what is going on.
Le miracle de l'amour	(lit. The miracle of love)	1995–1996	France	French	First sequel series to Hélène et les Garçons.
Les années bleues	(lit. The blue years)	1998	France	French	Sequel to Les années fac, which is itself a sequel to Premiers Baisers. The love stories, friendships and daily lives of Justine Girard's friends continue but without Justine.
Les années fac	(lit. The college years)	1995–1998	France	French	First sequel to Premiers Baisers. Continues the story of Justine Girard, played by Camille Raymond, and her friends, now college aged, in their friendships, romances and daily lives. Followed by Les années bleues.
Les Filles d'à côté	(lit. The Girls next door)	1993–1995	France	French	Claire, Fanny and Magalie leave their husbands and they and their children move into one apartment together. The three of them develop an attraction for their new neighbor, Daniel, an American fashion photographer. He is already engaged and not at all interested. However, Marc, his live-in guest, is immediately attracted to the three of them and is continually hatching plans to seduce them.
Les mystères de l'amour	Love in Paris (lit. The mysteries of love)	2011–present	France	French	The romances continue in this third sequel series derived from Hélène et les Garçons.
Les Nouvelles Filles d'à côté	(lit. The New Girls next door)	1995–1996	France	French	Sequel to Les Filles d'à côté. Claire is in the same apartment but now lives with her sister Karen and her friend Sabine. Marc is still living in Daniel's apartment but Daniel is no longer there. Marc is now obsessed with Adeline. She just moved into the building with Gérard, who works at a gym.
Les vacances de l'amour	(lit. The holidays of love)	1996–2007	France	French	Second sequel series of Hélène et les Garçons.
Mes pires potes	(lit. My worst buddies)	2000–2001	France	French	Simon inherited a house in a Parisian suburb and now lives there with his three friends who crash his car, use his money to buy bad sculptures, have many sexual partners over and so on.
Premiers Baisers	(lit. First Kisses)	1991–1995	France	French	This story follows the romantic adventures of sixteen-year-old Justine Girard, played by Camille Raymond, and her friends. Also the character of Hélène Girard, Justine's older sister and the main character of Hélène et les garçons and its sequels is first introduced in Premiers Baisers.
Salut les Musclés	(lit. Hello the Muscular Ones) Les Musclés, which means The Muscular Ones, is the name of a fictional musical band.	1989–1994	France	French	The lives and loves of Minet, Éric, Rémy, Framboisier and René who are the musical band, Les Musclés. They live together with their friend from the planet Vega, Hilguegue, played by Babsie Steger. The series spawned the sequel, La Croisière foll'amour. Framboisier's niece, Justine, is the main character of Premiers Baisers and Les années fac. Justine's friends' stories continue in Les années bleues. Justine's older sister, Hélène, is the main character of Hélène et les garçons and its three sequels.

==== Sketch comedy ====
Original title in France	English title (or literal meaning)	Year	Country of origin	Original language	Summary
SAV des émissions		2005–2012	France	French	Also known as Le Service après-vente des émissions. Each episode is approximately two minutes, fifteen seconds long.
Vous les femmes	WOMEN! (lit. You the women)	2007–2011	France	French	A series written by and starring Judith Siboni and Olivia Côte. The two play various women from all walks of life in ordinary circumstances that often turn absurd.

=== Crime ===
==== Crime drama ====
Original title in France	English title (or literal meaning)	Year	Country of origin	Original language	Summary
Arsène Lupin	N/A (Title is main character's name.)	1971–1974	France; Canada; Netherlands; Switzerland; Italy; Germany; Austria	French	Loosely based on the novels by Maurice Leblanc, Arsène Lupin is a gentleman thief and master of disguise.
Les Beaux Mecs	Tony's Revenge (lit. The Handsome Guys) French title refers to gangsters and means something like The Wise Guys.	2011	France	French	Old school gangster, Tony Roucas, shares a tiny prison cell with street hoodlum, Kenz, with whom he has next to nothing in common. When Kenz breaks out he tags along. Betrayed by his old gang, Tony is forced to stay with Kenz. He is appalled yet intrigued by the young crook's cavalier criminal methods as compared to the codes and meticulous planning of his era. Throughout the series, Tony's past is revealed in flashbacks of the 1950s to 1980s.
Mafiosa	The title is the Italian word for a female mafia member. see: mafiosa	2006–2014	France	French; Italian; Corsican	After her uncle is assassinated, thirty year-old Sandra Paoli inherits his position as the leader of a powerful mafia clan.
Le transporteur - la série	Transporter: The Series	2012–present	France; Canada; Germany; United States	English	Based on the Transporter film series. Frank Martin is a freelancer who will deliver anything to anywhere in Europe for the right price, no questions asked, so long as his three rules are followed. These are that no names are exchanged, the deal never changes and that the package is not opened en route. However, he has a habit of breaking these rules himself.

==== Legal drama ====
Original title in France	English title (or literal meaning)	Year	Country of origin	Original language	Summary
Alice Nevers: Le juge est une Femme	The Judge Is a Woman	1993–present	France	French	The investigations of the titular character who is a juge d'instruction (examining magistrate). The 1993 pilot episode's title was Le juge est une femme (The judge is a woman). For the first seven seasons (1994–2002), the show was named Florence Larrieu, le juge est une femme after the main character Florence Larrieu, played by Florence Pernel. In 2002, when Pernel left the series, the name changed to match that of the new lead character, Alice Nevers, played by Marine Delterme.

==== Mystery ====
Original title in France	English title (or literal meaning)	Year	Country of origin	Original language	Summary
Les Petits Meurtres d'Agatha Christie	(lit.Agatha Christie's Little Murders)	2009–present	France; Switzerland	French	French adaptations of some of Agatha Christie's mysteries.

==== Police comedy-drama ====
Original title in France	English title (or literal meaning)	Year	Country of origin	Original language	Summary
Élodie Bradford	N/A (Title is main character's name.)	2004–2007	France	French	Follows the adventures of a police lieutenant, Élodie Bradford.
Les Bleus: premiers pas dans la police	(lit. The Rookies: first steps in the police)	2006–2010	France	French	A group of young police officers participate in their first investigations ranging from dog napping to murder. In addition to these challenges Laura suspects that the Commissaire is her father, Lyès tries to keep his siblings in line, Kévin has nowhere to live, Nadia is having an affair with the boss and Alex's friends are all petty criminals. Mostly humorous, but sometimes tragic, as when Laura's refusal to believe a victim ends in suicide. The show is popular for the same-sex romance between Kévin and Capitaine Yann Berthier.
Marie Pervenche	N/A (Title is main character's name.)	1984–1991	France; Switzerland	French	While working at a Paris Commissariat, Marie Lorieux grows tired of her limited assignment of handing out parking tickets. She begins to conduct her own investigations into the city's crimes.

==== Police drama ====
Original title in France	English title (or literal meaning)	Year	Country of origin	Original language	Summary
Antigone 34	N/A (The title is the name of the police district where the story takes place.)	2012	France	French	Set in Antigone, an area in the city of Montpellier. Police detective Léa Hippolyte solves crimes with the help of her two unconventional friends, psychologist Hélène de Soyère and doctor Victor Carlier.
Braquo	Slang for Braquage (armed robbery).	2009–2016	France	French	Max Rossi of the SDPJ of Hauts-de-Seine (a branch of the criminal investigation division of the Police Nationale) commits suicide after being wrongfully accused of criminal negligence. Devastated by the loss of their superior, Eddy, Walter, Roxane and Théo vow to do whatever it takes to right this wrong, even if they must step outside of the law to do it.
Les Brigades du Tigre	The Tiger Brigades	1974–1983	France	French	Period police series set in the early twentieth century, following cases investigated by one of the mobile police units set up by Georges Clemenceau (the ‘Tiger’).
Candice Renoir	N/A (Title is main character's name.)	2013–present	France	French	After a decade spent raising her four children, Commandant Candice Renoir returns to the police force.
Cherif	N/A (Title is main character's name.)	2013–2019	France	French	Dedicated police officer Capitaine Kader Cherif lives across the street from the police station. He and partner Capitaine Adeline Briard, both from the Brigade criminelle in Lyon, solve crimes using effective yet unusual methods.
Commissaire Cordier	(lit. Commissioner Cordier), though the position is not actually identical. See: Commissaire de police	2005–2008	France	French	After his promotion to Commissaire Principal, Pierre Cordier continues his fight against crime without the aid of his children, who have both left home. This is a spin-off of the series Les Cordiers: Juge et Flic, which followed Pierre Cordier's adventures with his daughter and son who are an investigative journalist and an examining magistrate.
Commissaire Moulin	(lit. Commissioner Moulin), though the position is not actually identical. See: Commissaire de police	1976–1982 and 1989–2008	France	French	A long running police series following the adventures of Jean-Paul Moulin, a lighthearted police commissaire, and his team as they solve crimes.
Dolmen	N/A (see: Dolmen)	2005	France	French	A young police officer, Marie Kermeur, returns to the island she was born on to marry her childhood sweetheart, Christian. Once there, she is again haunted by nightmares she had as a child. Her brother, Gildas, is found dead at the bottom of a cliff and the menhirs outside of town begin to bleed. A series of murders follows. Marie decides to investigate with the help of the local police inspector.
Julie Lescaut	N/A (Title is main character's name.)	1992–2014	France	French	A twenty-two season series about the adventures of Commissaire Julie Lescaut. Commissaire Lescaut (played by Véronique Genest) is the single mother of two girls, Sarah and Élisabeth ("Babou"), and runs a Commissariat de Police staffed with about thirty officers, who are under her command.
Les Témoins	Witnesses	2014	France; Belgium	French	Bodies of murder victims are pulled from graves, and the former police chief is implicated.
Navarro	N/A (Title is main character's name.)	1989–2006	France; Switzerland	French	Antoine Navarro, a single father, raises his daughter (Yolande) and works as a Parisian Commissaire de Police.
Nox (mini-series)		2018	France	French	A mass murderer/s is hiding bodies in the catacombs beneath Paris.
P.J.	C.I.D. Not to be confused with C.I.D., the 1998–present Indian police drama series.	1997–2009	France	French	A window into the daily lives of the officers of a Paris Commissariat de Police. P.J. is also known in France as P.J.: Police judiciaire (lit. P.J.: judicial Police).
Profilage	(lit. Profiling)	2009–2020	France	French	Created by Sophie Lebarbier and Fanny Robert. Criminal psychologist, Chloé Saint-Laurent, puts herself in the shoes of victims and criminals alike to assist the police in solving crimes.
Section de Recherches	(lit. Research Section)	2006–present	France	French	The Section de recherches (SR) is a research unit of the Gendarmerie nationale. They regularly handle difficult cases such as disappearances, child abductions and sex crimes and are empowered to extend their investigations beyond French borders.
Trois femmes flics	(lit. Three women cops)	2005	France	French	Three friends and roommates (Lisa, Manu and Justine) begin their careers in the police.
Une femme d'honneur	(lit. A woman of honor)	1996–2008	France	French	Isabelle Florent, an adjudant-chef in France's Gendarmerie nationale, directs criminal investigations while raising her son.

==== Police-legal drama ====
Original title in France	English title (or literal meaning)	Year	Country of origin	Original language	Summary
Engrenages	Spiral (lit. Gears)	2005–present	France	French	Most seasons begin with a gruesomely realistic corpse or two being found. Then Capitaine Laure Berthaud aggressively investigates these crimes along with Lieutenants "Gilou" and "Tintin" and the rest of her team. Meanwhile, at the Palais de Justice, François Roban a juge d'instruction (examining magistrate) and Pierre Clément a substitut du procureur (assistant prosecutor) deal with other crimes and corrupt politics in the community. Often on the other side of the law, Joséphine Karlsson, a young lawyer, will defend anyone and resort to anything in an effort to become wealthy and powerful.
Femmes de loi	(lit. Women of law)	2000–2009	France	French	Elisabeth Brochène, a substitut du procureur (assistant prosecutor), and police Lieutenant Marie Balaguère team up to solve criminal cases.
Les Cordiers: Juge et Flic	(lit. The Cordiers: Judge and Cop)	1992–2005	France	French	Depicts the crime fighting adventures of the Cordier family. Pierre Cordier is a police commissaire in Nanterre, a region of Paris. His son, Bruno, is a juge d'instruction (examining magistrate) and his daughter, Myriam, is an investigative journalist. This series is followed by a spin-off, Commissaire Cordier, which continues Commissaire Pierre Cordier's career after both his children have left.

==== Spy ====
Original title in France	English title (or literal meaning)	Year	Country of origin	Original language	Summary
Le Bureau des Légendes	The Bureau (TV series)	2015–2020	France	French	In the heart of the DGSE, a department called the ‘Bureau des légendes’ (‘cover story office’) runs a network of clandestine agents abroad. One of their number, Guillaume Debailly, alias Paul Lefebvre, alias Malotru, returns from a mission unable to shake off his emotional commitments, creating difficulties for his department and tensions with the CIA.
Léa Parker	Lea Parker	2004–2006	France	French	Léa Parker is an elite agent for the D.O.S. (Division des Opérations Spéciales, lit. Division of Special Operations), a secret section of the Police Nationale. However, this life and its adventures are kept hidden from her friends and family, all of whom believe her to be a simple police archivist.
No Limit	N/A	2012–present	France	French	

=== Documentary series ===
Original title in France	English title (or literal meaning)	Year	Country of origin	Original language	Summary
Des racines et des ailes	(lit. roots and wings)	1997–present	France	French	Series that explores cultures and periods of history in France and other countries.
Échappées Belles	(lit. Beautiful Escapes)	2006–present	France	French	Each week the host tours a country or region, focusing on the sites and interacting with local inhabitants. Near the end of the program there is a short segment that is part of the monthly voyage, entitled Les Routes mythiques (lit. mythic routes).
Enquêtes Extraordinaires	(lit. Extraordinary Investigations)	2010-	France	French	An investigative program that conducts scientific examinations of unexplained phenomena and experiences.
Faut pas rêver	(lit. Mustn't dream)	1990–present	France	French	A series that takes its audience around the world. Each episode concentrates on a different country, often leaving the beaten track, to take an in-depth look into persons, lifestyles, cultures or occupations.
L'Abécédaire de Gilles Deleuze	(lit. The ABCs of Gilles Deleuze)	1996	France	French	French philosopher Gilles Deleuze converses with journalist, friend and former student, Claire Parnet, on twenty-five themes in alphabetical order.
Le Grand Tour	(lit. The Grand Tour); See: Grand Tour	2012–2014	France	French	Producer and host, Patrick de Carolis, presents a worldwide cultural and historical exploration. Most episodes cross two or more countries to study the effect that a product, trade or ethnic group from the past has had on global culture. A recurring theme throughout the series is the influence of France on the world and vice versa.
Thalassa	Named for Thalassa, Greek primordial personification of the sea whose name means "Sea".	1975–present	France	French	Thalassa focuses on the sea from an ecological, geographical, sporting, transportation and historical point of view.
Ushuaïa Nature		1998–present	France	French	

=== Drama ===
==== Drama ====
Original title in France	English title (or literal meaning)	Year	Country of origin	Original language	Summary
3 x Manon	Three Times Manon	2014	France	French	Fifteen-year-old Manon is sent to a rehabilitation center after stabbing her mother. She has six months to prove herself. Also known as Trois fois Manon.
Clem	N/A (Title is main character's name)	2010–present	France	French	Clémentine (Clem), a sixteen-year-old girl, discovers she is fourteen weeks pregnant. It being too late for her to choose, she must carry her son to term.
Un village français	(lit. A French village)	2009–present	France	French	During World War II, German forces invade and occupy Villeneuve (lit. New town), a fictional French village on the French-Swiss border. Residents try to cope under the new regime.
Marseille	N/A (named after the French city Marseille)	2016–present	France	French	After 20 years as mayor of Marseille, Robert Taro (Depardieu) enters into a war of succession with his former protégé turned rival Lucas Barres (Benoît Magimel).[6][7] Both men are members of the "UPM" party, based on the centre-right UMP (Union for a Popular Movement).

==== Historical drama ====
Original title in France	English title (or literal meaning)	Year	Country of origin	Original language	Summary
Borgia	N/A	2011–2014	France; Germany; Czech Republic	English	
Napoléon	Napoleon	2002	France; Canada	French	A historical miniseries based on the four-part biography of Napoléon Bonaparte written by French writer-historian-politician, Max Gallo.

==== Medical drama ====
Original title in France	English title (or literal meaning)	Year	Country of origin	Original language	Summary
Fabien Cosma	N/A (Title is main character's name.)	2001–2007	France	French	Medical series starring Louis-Karim Nébati, named after the main character, Dr. Fabien Cosma.

==== Soap opera ====
Original title in France	English title (or literal meaning)	Year	Country of origin	Original language	Summary
Plus belle la vie	(lit. "more beautiful life")	2004–present	France	French	Popular show that plays five days a week. It already has over four thousand episodes and five million regular viewers.
Sous le soleil	(lit. Under the sun)	1996–2008	France	French	
Sous le soleil de Saint-Tropez	(lit. Under the Saint-Tropez sun)	2013–2014	France	French	
Demain nous appartient	(lit. "Tomorrow belongs to us")	2017–present	France	French	Popular show that plays five days a week. It already has over eight hundred episodes and three million regular viewers.

=== Erotic/adult ===
Original title in France	English title (or literal meaning)	Year	Country of origin	Original language	Summary
Série Rose	Softly from Paris (lit. Pink Series)	1986–1991	France	French	An anthology series where each episode features an author.
X Femmes	(lit. X Women)	2008–2009	France	French	A series of erotic short films made by female directors on the topic of sex/love.

=== Game show ===
Original title in France	English title (or literal meaning)	Year	Country of origin	Original language	Summary
Avec ou Sans Joker	(lit. With or without joker)				
Des chiffres et des lettres	(lit. numbers and letters)	1965–present	France	French	Originally titled Le Mot le plus long (lit. the longest word). Contestants formed words from seven random letters. The longest words received the most points. Off air from 1970 to 1972, the series returned under the current title. Since then it has been in two segments. The first was still the original word game, Le Mot le plus long. In the new segment, Le compte est bon (lit. the total is right), players were given a set of random numbers to add, subtract, divide or multiply to reach a predecided total. Since 2010 the number of letters drawn to form words has increased to ten. Spawned the 1982–present British adaptation, Countdown, as well as other international versions.
Fort Boyard	N/A (named after the real Fortress in France)	1990–present	France	French	The original version of the now international show. It has been remade by many countries, usually under the same title or one that is similar.
Le 4ème duel	(lit. The fourth duel)	2008–present	France	French	
Motus					
Pékin Express	(lit. Peking Express)				
Qui chante le plus juste ?	(lit. Who sings the most correctly)	2013–present	France	French	A karaoke style singing competition that the entire studio audience, about one hundred people, takes part in. The only judge, a computer named SAM aka système analytique de musique (lit. music analytic system), awards points based on who can sing the right notes. In the end there is a showdown between the last two competitors. Finalists win prizes such as mini-PCs and ski trips depending on how many points they accumulate.
Tout le monde aime la France	(lit. Everyone loves France)	2012–2013	France	French	
Tout le monde veut prendre sa place	(lit. Everyone wants to take their place)	2006–present	France	French	

=== News ===
Original Title in France	English Title (or Literal Meaning)	Year	Country of Origin	Original Language	Summary
12/13	N/A	1990–present	France	French	A midday news report that lasts 50 minutes and plays all seven days of the week on France 3. Past names include 12H45 and 12/14.
19/20	N/A	1986–present	France	French	A France 3 program that begins at 7:25 p.m. and lasts thirty minutes on weeknights and twenty-five minutes on Saturday and Sunday nights. 19/20 covers national, European and international news stories.
66 minutes	N/A	2006–present	France	French	A Sunday night general news program, made by M6, that has a run-time of 66 minutes.
90' Enquêtes					
Appels d'urgence					
Au cœur de l'enquête					
Au cœur du crime					
C'est un monde !	(lit. It's a world!)	2014–present	France	French	A half-hour sequence of the daily news show, Télématin.
Capital					
Complément d'enquête					
En quête d'actualité		2012–present	France	French	A ninety-minute news series on France's channel D8. Originally a bi-weekly program alternating with En quête de solutions. As of September, 2013 En quête d'actualité airs weekly.
En quête de solutions					
Encore plus d'action	(lit. Even more action)				
Enquête d'action					
Enquête exclusive	(lit. Exclusive investigation)				
Enquêtes criminelles : le magazine des faits divers					
Enquêtes et révélations					
Envoyé spécial					
Expression directe	(lit. direct expression)	1975–present	France	French	Government funded radio and television broadcasts by political parties, unions and professional organizations designed to create a direct dialogue between these groups and French citizens.
Faites entrer l'accusé					
Harry Roselmack en immersion					
Journal de 13 heures or 13 heures		1981–present	France	French	
Journal de 20 heures or 20 heures		1975–present	France	French	
Kiosque					
Le Journal télévisé					
Parole Directe	(lit. Direct Speech)				
Pièces à Conviction		2000–present	France	French	
Point route		1993–present	France	French	A Monday to Friday, 3–5 minute bulletin on road conditions, reported in real time. It is a segment of the daily news show, Télématin.
Reportages					
Sept à huit	(lit. Seven to eight)				
Suspect n° 1					
Télématin	(lit. Tele-morning)	1985–present	France	French	A daily show that is similar in style to The Today Show. Includes segments on news, weather, culture, traffic conditions, etc.
Zone Interdite	(lit. Forbidden Zone)	1993–present	France	French	

=== Reality show ===
Original title in France	English title (or literal meaning)	Year	Country of origin	Original language	Summary
Allo Nabilla	(lit. Hello Nabilla)				
L'École des fans		1976–present	France	French	
L'Île des vérités	(lit. Island of truths)	2011–2014	France	French	
La Maison du bluff	(lit. The House of bluff)	2010–present	France	French	A reality show about poker that is sponsored by the online poker room, PokerStars.
Les Anges (Previously: Les Anges de la télé-réalité)	(lit. The Angels or The Angels of reality tv)	2011–present	France	French	Former French reality show stars live together in a large villa in a foreign country. They attempt to break into their chosen field in the entertainment industry with the help of celebrity sponsors.
Les Ch'tis	(lit. The Ch'tis) Ch'tis are people who speak "Ch'ti", the Picard language.	2011–present	France	French	Follows nine to ten candidates from the Nord-Pas-de-Calais region of France and from Belgium as they travel to a different country in each season. There are no challenges or eliminations. The focus is on the culture shock exhibited by the participants.
Les Marseillais	(lit. The people of Marseille)	2012–present	France	French	Based on Les Ch'tis but with candidates from the French region of Marseille.
Qui sera le prochain grand pâtissier ?	(lit. Who will be the next great pastry chef?)	2013–present	France	French	
Qui veut épouser mon fils ?	(lit. Who wants to marry my son)	2010–present	France	French	A handful of mothers try to find wives for their adult sons, who still live with them. Similar to the 2012–2013 Australian series, Please Marry My Boy.
Une semaine pour faire la fête	(lit. One week to party)				

=== Religious ===
Original title in France	English title (or literal meaning)	Year	Country of origin	Original language	Summary
Le Jour du Seigneur	(lit. The Lord's Day)	1949–present	France	French	The oldest French television series that is still running. Since 1949, it has aired every Sunday morning for an hour and a half. The program airs Catholic religious ceremonies, interviews and testimonials.

=== Speculative fiction ===
==== Horror ====
Original title in France	English title (or literal meaning)	Year	Country of origin	Original language	Summary
Les Revenants	The Returned	2012–present	France	French	Long dead citizens of a small town return and try to pick up where they left off with their living friends and relatives. Based on the 2004 French film, Les Revenants.

==== Science fiction ====
Original title in France	English title (or literal meaning)	Year	Country of origin	Original language	Summary
Code Lyoko: Evolution	N/A	2013	France	French	A year after the events of Code Lyoko, Jeremie and his friends are again forced from their regular lives as X.A.N.A., inadvertently released by a mad scientist, returns to threaten humanity once more.
Éternelle	(lit. Eternal)	2009	France	French	
Mystère	Lost Signs	2007	France; Belgium; Switzerland	French	A mini-series about alien abductions.
Métal Hurlant Chronicles	(lit. Howling Metal Chronicles)	2012–present	France; Belgium	French, English	An anthology series where every episode takes place on a different planet and with a completely new cast of characters. The only thing linking the stories is a comet named Métal Hurlant that passes by each planet. Based on the ongoing French comic book series, Métal hurlant, created in 1974 by Jean Giraud, Philippe Druillet, Jean-Pierre Dionnet and Bernard Farkas.

==== Superhero ====
Original title in France	English title (or literal meaning)	Year	Country of origin	Original language	Summary
Hero Corp	N/A	2008–present	France	French	A comedic superhero series.

==== Supernatural ====
Original title in France	English title (or literal meaning)	Year	Country of origin	Original language	Summary
Joséphine Ange Gardien	(lit. Joséphine Guardian Angel)	1997–present	France; Belgium; Switzerland	French	For the first season known as Joséphine, profession ange gardien (lit. Joséphine, profession guardian angel). A comedy-drama about a guardian angel who solves people's problems with her insight and magical powers.
Une Fille D'Enfer	(lit. A Girl from Hell)	2004–2005	France	French	A demon in the form of a young girl tries to trick a teenage boy into selling his soul.

=== Talk show ===
Original title in France	English title (or literal meaning)	Year	Country of origin	Original language	Summary
Apostrophes		1975–1990	France	French	Discussions on literature with one or more well-known authors per episode.
Bienvenue chez Cauet					
Bouillon de culture	(lit. culture bouillon or culture broth)	1991–2001	France	French	Created by Bernard Pivot as a replacement for his earlier show, Apostrophes. Like its predecessor, Bouillon de culture consists mainly of literary discussions but also covers many other cultural topics.
C à vous					
Ce soir avec Arthur	(lit. This evening with Arthur)	2010–2013	France	French	Also known as Vendredi, tout est permis avec Arthur and Ce soir tout est permis avec Arthur.
Courbet sans aucun doute					
Jusqu'ici tout va bien					
Le Grand 8					
Le Grand Journal		2004–present	France	French	Previously named Le Grand Journal de Canal+.
Le Petit Journal					
Les Feux de la Rampe		2001–2003	France	French	Bernard Rapp interviews famous actors from French theater and cinema, one on one.
On n'est pas couché					
Touche pas à mon poste !					
Tout le monde en a parlé					
Zemmour et Naulleau					

=== Variety show ===
Original title in France	English title (or literal meaning)	Year	Country of origin	Original language	Summary
Le plus grand cabaret du monde	(lit. The biggest cabaret in the world)	1998–present	France	French	

== See also ==
- Cinema of France
- Culture of France
- List of French animated television series
- List of French-language Canadian television series
- List of French-language films
- Lists of French films
