= Rebecca Hampton =

French actress (born 1973)

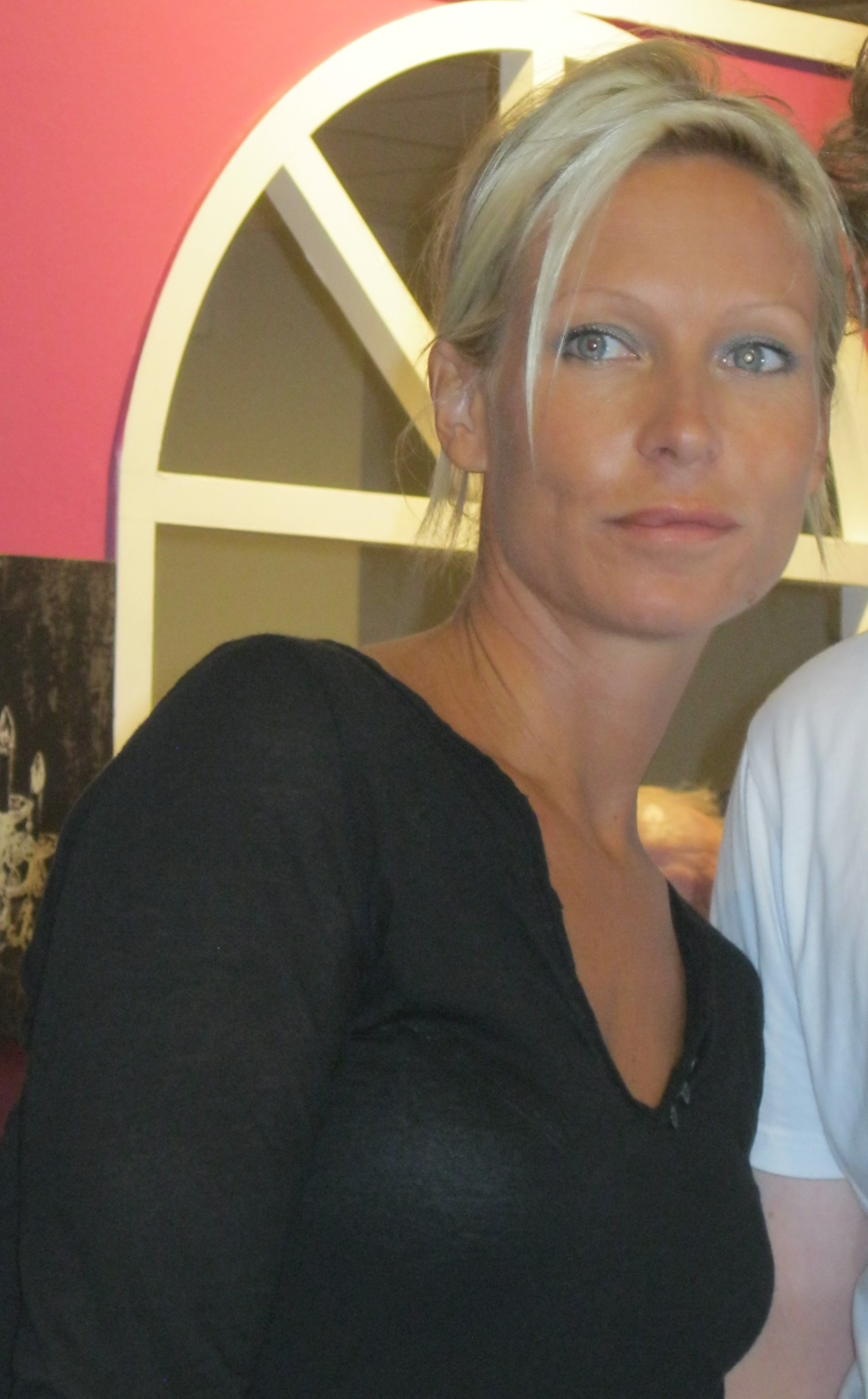
- Rebecca Hampton in 2011
- Born: Rebecca Hampton; 1 May 1973 (age 53); 15th arrondissement of Paris, France
- Occupation: Actress
- Years active: 1985–present
- Television: Plus belle la vie (2004–2022)

Rebecca Hampton (born 1 May 1973) is a French actress and television presenter.

She is best known for her role as Céline Frémont in the soap opera Plus belle la vie and for having played Commissioner Paloma Ruiz in the series Duval et Moretti in 2008.

Furthermore, she co-hosts the show Y'a que la vérité qui compte with Pascal Bataille and Laurent Fontaine, first on TF1 from 2002 to 2004, then from 2023 when the programme returned to C8.

== Biography ==
=== Family ===
Hampton was born in Paris to an English father and a Polish mother who was a dance teacher. Rebecca Hampton has a sister, Justine, and a brother, Jean-Baptiste Pellerin, who is a photographer.

=== Career ===
As a child, she played in Chantal Goya's show The Flying Shoe.

She began acting in the cinema in 1985, in the short film Le Livre de Marie.

In the 1990s, she played various roles in Mediawan Thematics productions on TF1: notably a groupie in an episode of Hélène et les Garçons in 1992, in Les Années fac in 1995 where she played Clarisse, a man-eater who was Daniel's unfaithful girlfriend in 19 episodes and also played Patricia in Les Vacances de l'amour in 1997.

In 2001, she made an appearance in the action film Yamakasi: Modern Samurai. The same year, she appeared in the video for the song Le vent nous portera by the rock group Noir Désir in which she played the little boy's mother as a brunette.

She then became known to the general public between 2002 and 2004, after appearing on the entertainment show Y'a que la vérité qui compte hosted by Pascal Bataille and Laurent Fontaine, first on TF1 in which she accompanied the people invited in waiting to find out who invited them.

Then, she played in the successful soap opera Plus belle la vie on France 3 from 2004 to 2022, playing the character of Céline Frémont in regular episodes, as well as in special TV films broadcast occasionally in the first part of the evening on the same channel .

She appeared in TF1 police series such as Commissaire Moulin between 2003 and 2004, La Crim' in 2004 and Julie Lescaut in 2005.

In 2008, on the same channel, she played one of the main roles, commissioner Paloma Ruiz, in the series Duval et Moretti alongside Alexandre Brasseur and Emmanuel Patron.

In 2009 and 2010, she played in the theatre in the boulevard play Attache-moi au radiator, by Raffy Shart, with Anthony Delon and Arsène Mosca, then in 2010 and 2011 in Le Chêne d'Allouville with Georges Beller.

In 2011, at the Studio des Ursulines, she paid tribute to the actress and singer Colette Renard (died in 2010), with François Leterrier, Jacques Ferchit, Alexandre Laborde and Sinan Bertrand as part of a Nod to Colette Renard by Pascal Maurice known as Paul Melchior.

On 4 August 2007, 20 August 2011, 25 August 2012, 19 August 2017 and 13 August 2022, she participated in the game show Fort Boyard on France 2.

On 25 April 2013, she announced that she was expecting a baby and that she wishes to move away from film sets during her maternity leave.

She wrote Lettres de là-bas, a book of correspondence with Pascal Maurice known as Paul Melchior, published in September 2013, followed by New letters from there in 2018.

She appeared again on television (notably in Touche pas à mon poste !) and presented the show PBLV part en live! alternating with Alexandre Fabre from 28 September to 7 October. She announced her return to Plus belle la vie on 11 November 2013.

She notably played in a prime-time special of the series Nos chers voisins on TF1, in TV films from the Meurtres à... and Les Mystères de... series and in episodes of Commissaire Magellan and La Stagiaire for France 3, as well as in the series Léo Matteï and Camping Paradis on TF1.

In 2023, she starred in the play For Better and for Worse, alongside Booder. The same year, she again co-hosted Y'a que la vérité quicompte with Bataille et Fontaine, when the show returned to C8.

== Personal life ==
After a two-year relationship with actor Serge Dupire from 2004 to 2006, she had a relationship with comedian Patrick Bosso.

In April 2013, she announced an unexpected pregnancy. Her daughter Eléa was born on 21 August 2013. She subsequently revealed that the father was radio host David Bérard.

In an issue of Gala published in November 2022, she revealed her new relationship, Vincent Azé, theatre author with whom she has been in a relationship with since 2021.

== Filmographies ==
=== Films ===
Year	Film	Type	Producer	Role
1984	Le Livre de Marie	Short film	Anne-Marie Miéville	Marie
1996	Portraits chinois	Film	Martine Dugowson	Sophie
2000	Far from Syracuse	Short film	Éric Paccoud	Cléa
2001	Yamakasi	Film	Ariel Zeitoun and Julien Seri	the secretary of the minister's advisor
2003	Two Cars, One Night	Short film	Taika Waititi	
2006	Incontrôlable	Film	Raffy Shart	Rebecca
2009	Amélie au pays des Bodin's	Film	Éric Le Roch	Princess Bodin
2017	Des amours, désamour	Film	Dominic Bachy	Catherine
2019	Amon Amour	Short film	Dominic Bachy	Catherine
2022	Les SEGPA	Film	Ali Bougheraba and Hakim Bougheraba	Claire's mother
2023	Les SEGPA au ski	Film	Ali Bougheraba and Hakim Bougheraba	Claire's mother

=== Television ===
- 1992: Hélène et les Garçons (saison 1, épisode 67: Les groupies): une groupie
- 1992: Carré d'as, série télévisée de Marc Lobet
- 1995: Les Années fac, de Jean-François Porry: Clarisse (dans 19 épisodes)
- 1996: Studio des artistes de Jean-François Porry (dernier épisode: Quitte ou double)
- 1996: Les Vacances de l'amour de Jean-François Porry (saison 2, épisode 5: Le roi de cœur): Patricia
- 1996: Troubles (saison 1, épisode 13: Cinéma Vérité): Alison Kendall
- 2001: Le Prix de la vérité, téléfilm de Joël Santoni: Maryse Spontini
- 2001: Blague à part de Daive Cohen (saison 3, épisode 14: Black à part): la fille qui dîne avec Mike
- 2003: Commissaire Moulin (saison 6, épisode 3: Sale bizness): le médecin de Méka
- 2004: Commissaire Moulin (saison 6, épisode 5: Bandit d'honneur): Catherine
- 2004: La Crim' (saison 9 épisode 6: Meurtre sous influence): Mathilde
- 2004 - 2022: Plus belle la vie: Céline Frémont, in 1510 episodes, and some special episodes:
  - 2009: Les Filles du désert
  - 2013: Petits arrangements avec l'amour
  - 2022: Sept mariages et un enterrement
- 2005: Julie Lescaut (saison 14, épisode 2: Mission spéciale): Céline
- 2005: Rosalie s'en va, téléfilm de Jean-Dominique de La Rochefoucauld: Carole
- 2006: Préjudices (saison 1, épisode 5: Gendarme): Zoe Turner
- 2008: Duval et Moretti (21 épisodes): commissaire Paloma Ruiz
- 2014: Meurtres à Carcassonne de Julien Despaux: Angélique Demange
- 2015: Plus belle la vie: ensemble (saison 1, épisode 11: Partager l'information)
- 2017: Nos chers voisins au ski: une employée du zoo
- 2017: Camping Paradis (saison 9, épisode 3: Une nouvelle vie): Caroline
- 2018: Commissaire Magellan (saison 10, épisode 2: Rêve brisé réalisé par Etienne Dhaene): Mathilde Saunier
- 2019: Léo Matteï, Brigade des mineurs (saison 6, épisode 2: La Piste aux étoiles): Hélène Dolbeault
- 2020: La Stagiaire (saison 5, épisode 1: Espace détente): Éléonore Montel
- 2020: Les Mystères de la chorale d'Emmanuelle Dubergey: Laurence Virlax
- 2020: PBLV et le Défenseur des droits
  - Season 1, episode 3: Céline and Charles Frémont
  - Season 1, episode 4: César and Céline
- 2023: Camping Paradis (season 14, episode 3: Les Bleus à La Réunion ): Delphine Rivière

=== Television (as herself) ===
==== As host ====
- 2002-2004: Y'a que la vérité qui compte on TF1
- 2009: Brit Week on Virgin 17
- 2013: PBLV part en live ! on France 3
- 2014: Les animaux font leur show on NRJ12
- Depuis 2023: Y'a que la vérité qui compte on C8

==== As participant ====
- 2007, 2011, 2012, 2017, 2022: Fort Boyard on France 2: participant
- 2009: Mot de passe on France 2: candidate
- 2018: Élection de Miss Prestige National 2018 on TL7: head of jury
- 2020: Boyard Land on France 2: participant

=== Music videos ===
- 2001: Le vent nous portera by Noir Désir: young woman
- 2001: Ich will by Rammstein

== Théâtre ==
- 1980–1981: The Flying Shoe, musical comedy by Jean-Jacques Debout with Chantal Goya
- 2009–2010: Tie me to the radiator, comedy by Raffy Shart with Anthony Delon and Arsène Mosca
- 2013–2014: Get out of this body, by Willy Liechty
- 2016: La Surprise de Pierre Sauvil, directed by Olivier Macé and Jean-Pierre Dravel, on tour
- 2017–2018: We die if we want!, written and directed by Kanouk
- 2020–2022: Panic in the ministry by Jean Franco and Guillaume Mélanie, directed by Guillaume Mélanie, Théâtre Tête d'Or and tour: Gabrielle Bellecour
- 2023: The Way of Women, directed by Séverine Ferrer
- 2023: For better and worse, by Audrey Garcia, directed by Benjamin Massard, and tour: Jeanne
