= Les Mystères de l'amour =

- Genre: Drama; Romance
- Created by: Jean-Luc Azoulay
- Starring: Hélène Rollès; Patrick Puydebat; Laure Guibert; Philippe Vasseur; Laly Meignan; Sébastien Roch; Rochelle Redfield; Tom Schacht; Isabelle Bouysse
- Country of origin: France
- Original language: French
- No. of seasons: 37
- No. of episodes: 966

Production
- Running time: 45-55 minutes
- Production company: JLA Productions

Original release
- Network: TMC
- Release: 12 February 2011 – 28 December 2025

Les Mystères de l'amour (English Title: Love in Paris) is a French television series originally broadcast by TMC. It was created by Jean-Luc Azoulay. The original French title literally translates to The Mysteries of Love.

This is the third spin-off from the series Hélène et les Garçons, which ran from 1992–1994 and was followed by Le Miracle de l'amour (1994–1996), Les vacances de l'amour (1996–2007), Les Mystères de l'amour (2011–2025) and finally Amis pour toujours (2026–present).

== Plot ==
The series begins six years after the events of Les vacances de l'amour. The group of friends, now in their forties, have left Love Island after having lived there for many years and have returned to settle in Paris, the setting of the first series Hélène et les Garçons.

Everyone but Rudy thinks Jeanne died in a terrible plane crash and Nicolas is the only one who knows what has happened to Hélène. Nicolas, now a photographer, is living on a barge that is moored to the bank of the River Seine. He's in a relationship with Ingrid, the manager of a seedy bar. Bénédicte and José are managing a restaurant on Île de la Jatte. After rescuing his granddaughter, Olga has become Bénédicte's best friend. Christian has rejoined the group now that Johanna has returned to Texas. He is being financially supported by his young fiancee Angèle, while he pursues his dream of becoming a famous musician.

== Cast ==
Information as of last episode of last ended season

Actor : Character	Quantity of episodes:	Seasons		
Actor : Character	Quantity of episodes:	Opening titles: (Main cast)	In titles: (Recurring actors)	In titles: (Guest actors)
Patrick Puydebat : Nicolas Vernier	960	01-37		
Sébastien Roch : Christian Roquier	959	01-37		
Laly Meignan : Laly Polleï	951	01-37		
Laure Guibert : Bénédicte Breton Da Silva	950	01-37		
Hélène Rollès : Hélène Girard Watson Vernier	946	01-37		
Macha Polikarpova : Olga Poliarva Mirchtein	839	01-37	03	
Elsa Esnoult : Fanny Greyson	811	03-09, 14-37	02	
Philippe Vasseur : José Da Silva	750	01-33		
Carole Dechantre : Emilie (Ingrid) Soustal	743	01-09, 14-37		13
Tom Schacht : Jimmy Werner	737	01-08, 10-37	09	
Angèle Vivier : Aurélie Breton	607	13-29	03, 04, 10-12, 30-37	
Richard Pigois : John Greyson	560	05-25	03, 04, 26-37	
Marjorie Bourgeois : Le capitaine Stéphanie Dorville	534	13-29	08, 10-12, 30-37	
Isabelle Bouysse : Jeanne Garnier	527	01-09, 22-37	10, 21	
Cathy Andrieu : Cathy Soulagnet Da Silva	516	09-37	08	
Serge Gisquière : Peter Watson	430	04-24	03, 27, 33, 34, 37	
Jean-Luc Voyeux : Le lieutenant Claude Guéant	403	21-29	10, 12-20, 30-37	
Lakshan Abenayake : Rudy Ayake	388	01-37		
Marion Huguenin : Chloé Girard Roquier	386	03-08, 10-17	09, 22, 27-37	21
Magali Semetys : Le capitaine Marie Dumont	377	09-22	06-08	
Jean-Baptiste Sagory : Sylvain Potier	371	15-29	09-14, 30-37	
Benoît Dubois : Victor Sanchez	352	21-29	20, 30-37	
Julie Chevallier : Béatrice Goutolescou	309	19-24	09, 12-18, 26-37	
Elliot Delage : Julien Da Silva	308	19-25	08-18, 26-37	
Frank Delay : Pierre Roussell	279	19-29	16-18, 30-37	
Audrey Moore : Audrey McAllister Mallet Watson	265	08-14, 19	05-07, 16-18, 24-29, 36	
Charlène François : Sophie Grangier	249	19-22, 26-28	15-18, 23-25, 31, 32, 35-37	
Manon Schraen : Léa Werner # 3	235	09, 13-29	08, 10-12	33
Hélène Julie Renard : Alexandre "Alex" Pottier	209	26-29	18, 19, 22-25, 30-35	
Benjamin Cotte : Nicky McAllister Vernier # 2	207	16-29	32, 33, 35-37	
David Proux : Étienne Proudon	181	26-37		
Tony Mazari : Hugo Sanchez	179	15-20	12-14	
Allan Duboux : Éric Fava	176	26, 27	06-09, 16-22, 24, 25	
Valentin Byls : Nicky McAllister Vernier # 1	148	09, 13-15	05-08, 10-12	
Blanche Alcy : Lou Blanchet Vernier	146	23-29	22, 32, 33	
Ambre Rochard : Mélanie Gutteau	140	15-18	12-14	
Ève Peyrieux : Ève Watson	135	05, 06, 09	01, 02, 04, 08, 32-34, 36, 37	
Frédéric Attard : Le capitaine Anthony Maugendre	135	13-15	07-12	
Guillaume Gronnier-Henouil : Stephane-Guillaume Carrat	135	28, 29	19-21, 24-27, 30, 33-36	
Fabrice Josso : Étienne Varlier	132	09, 13, 14	06-08, 10-12, 16-18	
Xavier Delarue : Antoine/Bruno Valès-Tony Vargas	131	21-24	15, 16, 18-20, 25-27	14
Maëva El Aroussi : Gwen Watson	111	13-18	08-12	
Rochelle Redfield : Johanna McCormick	102	01, 05	04, 10, 11, 13, 17, 29, 30, 32, 35	12, 15, 16, 21
Manuela Lopez : Manuela Roquier	99	21-24	19, 20	
Mathilda Delecroix Denquin : Élise Beaulais-Bollet	98	23-29	22, 30, 31, 35	
Sophie Gemin : Clémence Dubois	81	25-27	23, 24, 28	
Michel Robbe : Jean-Paul Lambert	79	13-15	04-12	
Moise Crespy : Dr. Bob Blake	70	28, 29	26, 27, 30, 31	
Coralie Caulier : Angèle Dumont	62	01-03	03, 11	
Mallaury Nataf : Lola Garnier	57	21, 22	34, 35	33
Miglé Rimaityte Gumbriene : Valentina Douchkaia Watson	55	15	13, 14	
Sowan Laube : Erwan Watson # 2	53	13-18	12	
Legrand Bemba-Debert : Dr. Dylan Blake	53	25-27	24, 28	
Stéphane Sacre : Samuel M'Balembale	26	23-25	20-22, 34, 35, 37	
Ambroise Di Maggio : Diego Polleï de Carvalho # 2	23	09	08, 13	

== Episodes ==
=== Season 1 (2011) ===
#	Episode	Title	French title	Air date
001	01	The impossible return (Part 1)	L'impossible retour (Partie 1)	February-12-2011
002	02	The impossible return (Part 2)	L'impossible retour (Partie 2)	February-12-2011
003	03	Deliverance	Délivrance	February-19-2011
004	04	Drifts	Dérives	February-19-2011
005	05	Stratagems	Stratagèmes	February-26-2011
006	06	Lies	Mensonges	February-26-2011
007	07	Ultimatum	Ultimatum	March-05-2011
008	08	Sacrifice	Sacrifice	March-05-2011
009	09	Immediate Danger	Danger immédiat	March-12-2011
010	10	Injuries	Blessures	March-12-2011
011	11	Traps	Pièges	March-19-2011
012	12	Memories	Souvenirs	March-19-2011
013	13	Bait	L'appât	March-26-2011
014	14	Unscheduled Returns	Retours imprévus	March-26-2011
015	15	Confessions	Confessions	April-02-2011
016	16	Disappearance	Disparition subite	April-02-2011
017	17	Fatal obsession	Obsession fatale	April-09-2011
018	18	Sequestration	Séquestration	April-09-2011
019	19	In extremis	In extremis	April-16-2011
020	20	New start	Nouveau départ	April-16-2011
021	21	Troubled investigation	Troublante investigation	April-23-2011
022	22	Machination	Machination	April-23-2011
023	23	To the wall	Au pied du mur	April-30-2011
024	24	The exchange	L'échange	April-30-2011
025	25	Homecoming	Retrouvailles	May-07-2011
026	26	Ultimate revelations	Ultimes révélations	May-07-2011

=== Season 2 (2011–2012) ===
#	Episode	Title	French title	Air date
027	01	A Strange Tenant	Une étrange locataire	November-05-2011
028	02	Close monitoring	Surveillance rapprochée	November-05-2011
029	03	As a miracle	Comme un miracle	November-12-2011
030	04	Handling	Manipulation	November-12-2011
031	05	Threat	Menaces	November-19-2011
032	06	Reversals	Retournements	November-19-2011
033	07	Disappearance	Disparition	November-26-2011
034	08	The pursuit	La traque	November-26-2011
035	09	An unsustainable expectation	Une attente insoutenable	December-03-2011
036	10	Reciprocal attraction	Attirance réciproque	December-03-2011
037	11	Dishonest Selection	Sélection malhonnête	December-10-2011
038	12	Spying	Espionnage	December-10-2011
039	13	Uncertain memory	Mémoire incertaine	December-17-2011
040	14	Crossover	Chassé-croisé	December-17-2011
041	15	Redemption	Rédemption	January-07-2012
042	16	Slip in love	Dérapage amoureux	January-14-2012
043	17	Dangerous outlets	Sorties dangereuses	January-21-2012
044	18	Dramatic suspicions	Dramatiques soupçons	January-28-2012
045	19	Lies and betrayals	Mensonges et trahisons	February-04-2012
046	20	Wolves in the sheepfold	Des loups dans la bergerie	February-11-2012
047	21	Strange reactions	Étranges réactions	February-18-2012
048	22	Trafficking and Confessions	Trafics et confessions	February-25-2012
049	23	The Incredible Return	L'incroyable retour	March-03-2012
050	24	Flagrants Offenses	Flagrants délits	March-10-2012
051	25	Terrible confessions	Terribles aveux	March-17-2012
052	26	Till next time...	Jusqu'à la prochaine fois...	March-24-2012

=== Season 3 (2012–2013) ===
#	Episode	Title	French title	Air date
053	01	The family spirit	L'esprit de famille	May-26-2012
054	02	Youth mistakes	Erreurs de jeunesse	May-26-2012
055	03	Focus	Mise au point	June-02-2012
056	04	Separation	Séparation	June-09-2012
057	05	The Australian fiance	Le fiancé australien	June-16-2012
058	06	Leaky loves	Amours en fuites	June-23-2012
059	07	Dramatic surprises	Dramatiques surprises	June-30-2012
060	08	Back	Retour agité	July-07-2012
061	09	Between two lights	Entre deux feux	July-07-2012
062	10	Lies or betrayals?	Mensonges ou trahisons?	October-13-2012
063	11	Misconceptions	Méprises	October-20-2012
064	12	A love story	Une histoire d'amour	October-21-2012
065	13	The horrible doubt	L'horrible doute	October-28-2012
066	14	Anxious romance	Inquiétante romance	November-04-2012
067	15	Crazy in Love	Fou d'amour	November-11-2012
068	16	Seductions	Séductions	November-18-2012
069	17	Reversals	Retournements	November-25-2012
070	18	Difficult decision	Décision difficile	December-02-2012
071	19	Extreme tensions	Tensions extrêmes	December-09-2012
072	20	The pariah	La paria	December-16-2012
073	21	Solidarity	Solidarité	January-06-2013
074	22	Trades	Échanges	January-13-2013
075	23	All for all	Le tout pour le tout	January-20-2013
076	24	New start	Nouveau départ	January-27-2013
077	25	Preparations	Préparatifs	February-03-2013
078	26	Wedding	Mariage	February-10-2013

=== Season 4 (2013) ===
#	Episode	Title	French title	Air date
079	01	Daddy looking for Mom	Papa cherche maman	February-17-2013
080	02	Beautiful projects	De beaux projets	February-24-2013
081	03	Blackmail	Chantage	March-03-2013
082	04	Misleading appearances	Trompeuses apparences	March-10-2013
083	05	Pretty dolls	Jolies poupées	March-17-2013
084	06	To each his toy	À chacun son jouet	March-24-2013
085	07	Worry	Inquiétude	March-31-2013
086	08	A little bit of me	Un petit peu de moi	April-07-2013
087	09	Fevers	Fièvres	April-14-2013
088	10	Resurgences	Résurgences	April-21-2013
089	11	Traveling	Voyages	April-28-2013
090	12	Rivalries	Rivalités	May-05-2013
091	13	Love Island	Love Island	May-12-2013
092	14	Good news	Bonnes nouvelles	May-19-2013
093	15	Reconciliation	Rapprochement	May-26-2013
094	16	Lies	Mensonges	June-02-2013
095	17	Glacial	Glacial	June-09-2013
096	18	Sorrows	Tristesses	June-16-2013
097	19	Parallel Lines	Lignes parallèles	June-23-2013
098	20	The End of the Journey	La fin du voyage	July-06-2013
099	21	The die is cast	Les dés sont jetés	September-08-2013
100	22	The miracles of love	Les miracles de l'amour	September-15-2013
101	23	Homecoming	Retrouvailles	September-22-2013
102	24	In Vitriol	Au vitriol	September-29-2013
103	25	Tortures	Tortures	October-06-2013
104	26	Everything is fine !	Tout va bien !	October-13-2013

=== Season 5 (2013–2014) ===
#	Episode	Title	French title	Air date
105	01	Honeymoon	Bruits de noces	October-19-2013
106	02	Unions	Des unions	October-20-2013
107	03	Oversight	Oubli	October-26-2013
108	04	A heavy secret	Un lourd secret	October-27-2013
109	05	Departures	Départs	November-02-2013
110	06	Blows of follies	Coups de folies	November-03-2013
111	07	The test	Le test	November-09-2013
112	08	The man and the child	L'homme et l'enfant	November-10-2013
113	09	Temptations	Tentations	November-16-2013
114	10	Deceptions	Tromperies	November-17-2013
115	11	Upheavals	Bouleversements	November-23-2013
116	12	New life	Nouvelle vie	November-24-2013
117	13	Child games	Jeux d'enfants	November-30-2013
118	14	Decisions	Décisions	December-01-2013
119	15	Interrogations	Interrogations	December-07-2013
120	16	Research	Recherches	December-08-2013
121	17	Surveys	Enquêtes	December-14-2013
122	18	At the edge of the chasms	Au bord des gouffres	December-15-2013
123	19	Christmas mysteries	Les mystères de Noël	December-21-2013
124	20	A Merry Christmas	Un si joyeux Noël	December-22-2013
125	21	Father hopes	Père espère	December-28-2013
126	22	Risk taking	Prises de risques	December-29-2013
127	23	Happy New Year!	Bonne année!	January-05-2014
128	24	Feast of the kings ... and then Fanny	Fête des rois... et puis Fanny	January-12-2014
129	25	A master stroke	Un coup de maître	January-19-2014
130	26	The end of a story	La fin d'une histoire	January-26-2014

=== Season 6 (2014) ===
#	Episode	Title	French title	Air date
131	01	Overtures	Ouvertures	March-23-2014
132	02	Explanations	Explications	March-30-2014
133	03	At the same time (Part 1)	Parallèlement (Partie 1)	April-06-2014
134	04	At the same time (Part 2)	Parallèlement (Partie 2)	April-13-2014
135	05	Coup of the Fate	Coup du sort	April-20-2014
136	06	Laughter and tears	Des rires et des larmes	April-27-2014
137	07	At the water	À l'eau	May-04-2014
138	08	Life goes on	La vie continue	May-11-2014
139	09	Accusations	Accusations	May-18-2014
140	10	The trap closes	Le piège se referme	May-24-2014
141	11	Takeover	Prise de pouvoir	May-25-2014
142	12	An Ideal Guilty	Un coupable idéal	May-31-2014
143	13	Scandals	Scandales	June-01-2014
144	14	Calculations and manipulation	Calculs et manipulation	June-07-2014
145	15	Love, Lies and Rock and Roll	Amour, mensonges et Rock and Roll	June-08-2014
146	16	The key to the mysteries	La clé des mystères	June-14-2014
147	17	A funny ghost	Un drôle de revenant	June-15-2014
148	18	Out of sight	Loin des yeux	June-21-2014
149	19	The exile	L'exilé	June-22-2014
150	20	Too late?	Trop tard?	June-28-2014
151	21	The big jump	Le grand saut	June-28-2014
152	22	Returns	Retours	June-29-2014
153	23	Tours and Returns	Tours et retours	July-05-2014
154	24	Memory Failure	Défaut de mémoire	July-06-2014
155	25	Happy Birthday	Joyeux anniversaire	July-12-2014
156	26	In lights!	En feux !	July-13-2014

=== Season 7 (2014) ===
#	Episode	Title	French title	Air date
157	01	Laughter and flames	Des rires et des flammes	August-31-2014
158	02	The impossible choice	L'impossible choix	September-06-2014
159	03	Scandal!	Scandale !	September-07-2014
160	04	Traps and feelings!	Pièges et sentiments !	September-13-2014
161	05	The fruits of lies	Les fruits du mensonge	September-14-2014
162	06	Misunderstandings and surprises	Méprises et surprises	September-20-2014
163	07	Trapped	Pris aux pièges	September-21-2014
164	08	Flight	Fuite	September-27-2014
165	09	Confessions	Aveux	September-28-2014
166	10	Kisses given	Baisers donnés	October-04-2014
167	11	Couples and lies	Couples et mensonges	October-05-2014
168	12	Disappointments	Déceptions	October-11-2014
169	13	Proofs and proofs	Preuves et épreuves	October-12-2014
170	14	Truth inquiry	Enquête de vérité	October-18-2014
171	15	The Kiss of Cinderella	Le baiser de Cendrillon	October-19-2014
172	16	The Weapon of Crime	L'arme du crime	October-25-2014
173	17	Surprise dinner	Dîner surprise	October-26-2014
174	18	Returns and detours	Retours et détours	November-01-2014
175	19	Unmasked!	Démasqué !	November-02-2014
176	20	Terrible surprise	Terrible surprise	November-08-2014
177	21	Disappearing disappearance	Disparition inquiétante	November-09-2014
178	22	The big cleaning	Le grand nettoyage	November-15-2014
179	23	Misconceptions	Méprises	November-16-2014
180	24	Explosion	Explosion	November-22-2014
181	25	Destructive Differences	Différences destructrices	November-23-2014
182	26	Cloudy	Éclaircies	November-29-2014
183	27	Explosive Truths	Vérités explosives	November-30-2014

=== Season 8 (2014–2015) ===
#	Episode	Title	French title	Air date
184	01	A new life	Une nouvelle vie	December-06-2014
185	02	Lies and Feelings	Mensonges et sentiments	December-07-2014
186	03	Dedication	Dédicace	December-13-2014
187	04	The End of the Dream	La fin du rêve	December-14-2014
188	05	Love, Ghosts and Marriage (Part 1)	Amour, fantômes et mariage (Partie 1)	December-14-2014
189	06	Love, Ghosts and Marriage (Part 2)	Amour, fantômes et mariage (Partie 2)	December-14-2014
190	07	Show case	Show case	December-20-2014
191	08	The Christmas triumph	Le triomphe de Noël	December-21-2014
192	09	Use of forgery	Usage de faux	January-17-2015
193	10	Return of women	Retour de femmes	January-18-2015
194	11	The ghost	Le revenant	January-24-2015
195	12	Heart problem	Problème de cœur	January-25-2015
196	13	Shots of the Spell	Coups du sort	January-31-2015
197	14	Mirror to treasons	Miroir aux trahisons	February-01-2015
198	15	Then we dance	Alors on danse	February-07-2015
199	16	New tracks	Nouvelles pistes	February-08-2015
200	17	Taken and Misunderstood	Prises et méprises	February-14-2015
201	18	Happy Valentine's day	Bonne saint Valentin	February-15-2015
202	19	On other tracks	Sur d'autres pistes	February-21-2015
203	20	Hopes	Des espoirs	February-22-2015
204	21	Traps in series	Pièges en série	February-28-2015
205	22	Unity is strength	L'union fait la force	March-01-2015
206	23	Brothers and sisters	Frères et sœurs	March-07-2015
207	24	Pardon dangerous	Pardon dangereux	March-08-2015
208	25	The other child	L'autre enfant	March-14-2015
209	26	Pair of Fathers	Paire de pères	March-15-2015
210	27	Conspiracy	Conspiration	March-21-2015
211	28	False pretenses	Faux semblants	March-22-2015

=== Season 9 (2015) ===
#	Episode	Title	French title	Air date
212	01	New data	Nouvelles donnes	March-28-2015
213	02	Dinners in couples	Dîners en couples	March-29-2015
214	03	The Curse of the Guarani	Le sortilège des Guarani	April-04-2015
215	04	Shocks in series	Chocs en série	April-05-2015
216	05	New traps	Nouveaux pièges	April-11-2015
217	06	Odd and fathers	Impairs et pères	April-12-2015
218	07	Preparations of all kinds	Préparatifs en tout genre	April-18-2015
219	08	This is	Tel est pris	April-19-2015
220	09	Fugue	Fugue	April-25-2015
221	10	Hidden games	Les jeux cachés	April-26-2015
222	11	Masks fall	Des masques tombent	May-02-2015
223	12	Memories of the past	Souvenirs du passé	May-03-2015
224	13	The sick child	L'enfant malade	May-09-2015
225	14	Traps and Threats	Pièges et menaces	May-10-2015
226	15	Lies or Truth	Mensonges ou vérité	May-16-2015
227	16	Troubleshooting	Troublantes évidences	May-17-2015
228	17	Secrets and Preparations	Secrets et préparatifs	May-23-2015
229	18	Wedding surprise	Mariage surprise	May-24-2015
230	19	Honeymoon	Lendemain de noces	May-30-2015
231	20	Distress	Détresse	May-31-2015
232	21	Signatures	Signatures	June-06-2015
233	22	The night of lies	La nuit des mensonges	June-07-2015
234	23	Crazy in Love	Fou d'amour	June-13-2015
235	24	Spectacular turn of events	Coup de théâtre	June-14-2015
236	25	A handyman	Un homme à tout faire	June-20-2015
237	26	Painful decision	Douloureuse décision	June-21-2015
238	27	Day of Truth	Jour de vérité	June-27-2015
239	28	Sad end	Triste fin	June-28-2015

=== Season 10 (2015) ===
#	Episode	Title	French title	Air date
240	01	Back from holidays	Retour de vacances	August-29-2015
241	02	Attacks	Attaques	August-30-2015
242	03	The other man	L'autre homme	September-05-2015
243	04	The secret of Olga	Le secret d'Olga	September-06-2015
244	05	Removal requested	Enlèvement demandé	September-12-2015
245	06	Traps and gifts	Pièges et cadeaux	September-13-2015
246	07	A memorable anniversary	Un anniversaire mémorable	September-19-2015
247	08	Family Problems	Problèmes de famille	September-20-2015
248	09	Trapped	Pris au piège	September-26-2015
249	10	Surprises and Misunderstandings	Surprises et méprises	September-27-2015
250	11	Sneak attack	Sournoise attaque	October-03-2015
251	12	Identities	Identités	October-04-2015
252	13	The rival	La rivale	October-10-2015
253	14	Racketeering	Racket	October-11-2015
254	15	Injuries	Blessures	October-17-2015
255	16	Confessions	Aveux et désaveux	October-18-2015
256	17	Chassé Croisé	Chassé Croisé	October-24-2015
257	18	Fly face	Volte face	October-25-2015
258	19	Happy Halloween	Happy Halloween	October-31-2015
259	20	The announcement	L’annonce	November-01-2015
260	21	A friend ?	Une amie ?	November-07-2015
261	22	Homecoming	Retrouvailles	November-08-2015
262	23	Doubles games	Doubles jeux	November-14-2015
263	24	Reversals	Retournements	November-15-2015
264	25	The Hypocrites Ball	Le bal des hypocrites	November-21-2015
265	26	Precipitated departures	Départs précipités	November-22-2015

=== Season 11 (2015–2016) ===
#	Episode	Title	French title	Air date
266	01	Little Lies with Friends	Petits mensonges entre amis	November-28-2015
267	02	Loves and dislikes	Amours et désamours	November-29-2015
268	03	Side effects	Effets secondaires	December-05-2015
269	04	Socks and surprises	Prises et surprises	December-06-2015
270	05	Restless nights	Nuits agitées	December-12-2015
271	06	Guilty attraction	Coupable attirance	December-13-2015
272	07	Naughty and naughty	Coquins et coquines	December-19-2015
273	08	Everything is mystery in love	Tout est mystère dans l'amour	December-20-2015
274	09	Rendez-vous secrets	Rendez-vous secrets	January-09-2016
275	10	Serial lover	Serial lover	January-10-2016
276	11	Flagrants Offenses	Flagrants délits	January-16-2016
277	12	Songs and lies	Songes et mensonges	January-17-2016
278	13	Ultimate Betrayal	Ultime trahison	January-23-2016
279	14	Double betrayal	Double trahison	January-24-2016
280	15	The fall	La chute	January-30-2016
281	16	Worries	Inquiétudes	January-31-2016
282	17	Risk of explosion	Risques d’explosions	February-06-2016
283	18	Stress and Distress	Stress et détresse	February-07-2016
284	19	Anguish	Angoisse	February-13-2016
285	20	Sad Valentine's Day	Triste Saint Valentin	February-14-2016
286	21	Substitute	La remplaçante	February-20-2016
287	22	Release and arrest	Libération et arrestation	February-21-2016
288	23	Defects and procedures	Vices et procédures	February-27-2016
289	24	Unmasked	Démasqué	February-28-2016
290	25	Difficult returns	Retours difficiles	March-05-2016
291	26	The Sons of Destiny	Les fils du destin	March-06-2016

=== Season 12 (2016) ===
#	Episode	Title	French title	Air date
292	01	A month later	Un mois après	March-12-2016
293	02	Unreasonable	Déraisonnable	March-13-2016
294	03	The refusal	Le refus	March-19-2016
295	04	The fight	Le combat	March-20-2016
296	05	Doubt and Sequestration	Doute et Séquestration	April-02-2016
297	06	The family	La Famille	April-03-2016
298	07	Mysterious Disappearances	Disparitions mystérieuses	April-09-2016
299	08	An uncertain future	Un futur incertain	April-10-2016
300	09	The night of all dangers	La nuit de tous les dangers	April-16-2016
301	10	A love so violent	Un amour si violent	April-17-2016
302	11	Uncertainties	Incertitudes	April-23-2016
303	12	Cuddly Night	Nuit câline	April-24-2016
304	13	Lourdes presumptions	Lourdes présomptions	April-30-2016
305	14	Evidence and suspicion	Preuves et soupçons	May-01-2016
306	15	Dramatic remorse	Dramatiques remords	May-07-2016
307	16	In extremis	In extremis	May-08-2016
308	17	Surprising confessions	Surprenants aveux	May-14-2016
309	18	Not so bad	Pas si méchant	May-15-2016
310	19	Traps of all kinds	Pièges en tous genres	May-21-2016
311	20	Children Stories	Histoires d’enfants	May-22-2016
312	21	Dangerous crosses	Croisements dangereux	May-28-2016
313	22	Double twists	Doubles rebondissements	May-29-2016
314	23	Returns to sources	Retours aux sources	June-04-2016
315	24	Blow of fate?	Coup du sort ?	June-05-2016
316	25	Injuries and Healings?	Blessures et Guérisons ?	June-11-2016
317	26	The Past Deleted?	Le Passé Effacé ?	June-12-2016

=== Season 13 (2016) ===
#	Episode	Title	French title	Air date
318	01	Back to life	Retour à la vie	August-28-2016
319	02	Dangerous Operations	Opérations périlleuses	September-03-2016
320	03	Like the first day	Comme au premier jour	September-04-2016
321	04	Leaks and disappearances	Fuites et disparitions	September-10-2016
322	05	Newcomer	Nouveau venu	September-11-2016
323	06	Alliances	Alliances	September-17-2016
324	07	It's party !	C'est la fête !	September-18-2016
325	08	The happiness of some	Le bonheur des uns	September-24-2016
326	09	A day to pinball	Une journée à flipper	September-24-2016
327	10	Luck and bad luck	Chance et malchance	October-01-2016
328	11	Flagrant delirium!	Flagrant délire !	October-02-2016
329	12	A forbidden love	Un amour interdit	October-08-2016
330	13	Suspicions	Soupçons	October-09-2016
331	14	Tours and Returns	Tours et retours	October-15-2016
332	15	Aches	Malaises	October-16-2016
333	16	Difficult confessions	Difficiles aveux	October-22-2016
334	17	The scoop of the year!	Le scoop de l'année !	October-23-2016
335	18	Destiny	Le destin	October-29-2016
336	19	Removal requested	Enlèvement demandé	October-30-2016
337	20	Leaks and returns	Fuites et retours	November-05-2016
338	21	The harder the fall	Plus dure sera la chute	November-06-2016
339	22	When the child appears	Lorsque l'enfant paraît	November-12-2016
340	23	Well-ordered chastity	Chasteté bien ordonnée	November-13-2016
341	24	In Search of Truth	En quête de vérité	November-19-2016
342	25	The bottom of the cards	Le dessous des cartes	November-20-2016
343	26	Confessions and Revelations	Aveux et révélations	November-26-2016

=== Season 14 (2016–2017) ===
#	Episode	Title	French title	Air date
344	01	A sublime day	Une sublime journée	November-27-2016
345	02	Serial tests	Tests en série	December-03-2016
346	03	Homicide projected	Homicide projeté	December-04-2016
347	04	Joint Projects	Projets communs	December-10-2016
348	05	Arrival at Love Island	Arrivée à Love Island	December-11-2016
349	06	Dangers on Love Island	Dangers sur Love Island	December-11-2016
350	07	Weddings and reunions	Mariages et retrouvailles	December-17-2016
351	08	The robbery of the century	Le braquage du siècle	January-08-2017
352	09	Issuances	Délivrances	January-15-2017
353	10	Pairs and Mothers	Paires et mères	January-22-2017
354	11	Fathers	Pères experts	January-29-2017
355	12	Stories of girls	Histoires de filles	February-05-2017
356	13	Secrets Revealed	Secrets dévoilés	February-12-2017
357	14	When Mom appears	Lorsque maman paraît	February-19-2017
358	15	A deadly scoop	Un scoop mortel	February-26-2017
359	16	Great news	Grandes nouvelles	March-05-2017
360	17	Vengeances	Vengeances	March-12-2017
361	18	Guilty infidelities	Infidélités coupables	March-19-2017
362	19	Amazing revelations	Étonnantes révélations	March-26-2017
363	20	Pitfalls and encounter	Pièges et rencontre	April-02-2017
364	21	Murders on order	Meurtres sur commande	April-09-2017
365	22	Small murder and fat lies	Petit meurtre et gros mensonges	April-15-2017
366	23	Horrible discovery	Horrible découverte	April-16-2017
367	24	On two tables	Sur deux tableaux	April-22-2017
368	25	Danger of death	Danger de mort	April-23-2017
369	26	Weapons, tears and alarms	Armes, larmes et alarmes	April-29-2017

=== Season 15 (2017) ===
#	Episode	Title	French title	Air date
370	01	Stories of Sisters	Histoires de sœurs	April-30-2017
371	02	Surprise effect	Effet de surprise	May-06-2017
372	03	Fatal recklessness	Fatale imprudence	May-07-2017
373	04	Serial killeuse	Sérial killeuse	May-13-2017
374	05	Russian salads	Salades russes	May-14-2017
375	06	Dangerous loves	Amours dangereux	May-20-2017
376	07	Departure and rebirth	Départ et renaissance	May-21-2017
377	08	Ranimate the Past	Ranimer le passé	May-27-2017
378	09	Uncertain memory	Mémoire incertaine	May-28-2017
379	10	Vows and confessions	Vœux et aveux	June-03-2017
380	11	Imminent departures	Départs imminents	June-04-2017
381	12	Memories memories	Souvenirs, souvenirs	June-10-2017
382	13	Traps and confessions	Pièges et aveux	June-11-2017
383	14	This music in me	Cette musique en moi	June-17-2017
384	15	Marignan	Marignan	June-18-2017
385	16	Removal	Enlèvement	June-24-2017
386	17	Because it's you	Parce que c'est toi	July-01-2017
387	18	Holiday Returns	Retours de vacances	September-10-2017
388	19	Despairing love	Désespoirs amoureux	September-16-2017
389	20	Worrying vision	Inquiétante vision	September-17-2017
390	21	A tragic end	Une fin tragique	September-23-2017
391	22	An angel passes	Un ange passe	September-24-2017
392	23	Identification	Identification	September-30-2017
393	24	Disappointed Hopes	Espoirs déçus	October-01-2017
394	25	Amazing surprises	Aveux surprenants	October-07-2017
395	26	An Air of Tennessee	Un air de Tennessee	October-08-2017

=== Season 16 (2017-2018) ===
#	Episode	Title	French title	Air date
396	01	Nashville blues	Nashville blues	October-14-2017
397	02	Love for one piece of luggage	L’amour pour seul bagage	October-15-2017
398	03	Arrivals and departures	Arrivées et départs	October-21-2017
399	04	Trapped	Pris aux pièges	October-22-2017
400	05	Surprising confessions	Surprenants aveux	October-28-2017
401	06	The vise is tightening	L’étau se resserre	October-29-2017
402	07	Insoluble traps	Pièges insolubles	November-04-2017
403	08	Backfire	Retour de bâton	November-05-2017
404	09	Sad departure	Triste départ	November-11-2017
405	10	A simple prayer	Une simple prière	November-12-2017
406	11	Short respite	Court répit	November-18-2017
407	12	Between life and love	Entre la vie et l’amour	November-19-2017
408	13	Surprising back	Surprenant retour	November-25-2017
409	14	Please to love	Prière d’aimer	November-26-2017
410	15	By elimination	Par élimination	December-02-2017
411	16	Religiously yours	Religieusement vôtre	December-03-2017
412	17	The spirit of evil	L’esprit du mal	December-09-2017
413	18	Head returned	La tête retournée	December-10-2017
414	19	Accidental encounters	Rencontres accidentelles	December-16-2017
415	20	Search be expensive	Recherche être cher	December-17-2017
416	21	The Mysteries of Christmas: Part One	Les Mystères de Noël : Première partie	December-17-2017
417	22	The Mysteries of Christmas: Part Two	Les Mystères de Noël : Deuxième partie	December-17-2017
418	23	Serial returns	Retours en série	January-07-2018
419	24	Surprises in series	Surprises en série	January-14-2018
420	25	Flagrant delusions	Flagrants délires	January-21-2018
421	26	Very angry	Très fâchée	January-28-2018
422	27	Revenge with hazel eyes	La vengeance aux yeux noisettes	February-04-2018
423	28	Break points	Points de rupture	February-11-2018

=== Season 17 (2018) ===
#	Episode	Title	French title	Air date
424	01	Breaks and confessions	Ruptures et aveux	February-18-2018
425	02	False interpretations	Fausses interprétations	February-24-2018
426	03	Fat coincidences	Fatales coïncidences	February-25-2018
427	04	Partner changes	Changements de partenaires	March-03-2018
428	05	Worse and worse	De mal en pis	March-04-2018
429	06	Consultations	Consultations	March-10-2018
430	07	Difficult breaks	Ruptures difficiles	March-11-2018
431	08	Broken loves	Amours brisés	March-17-2018
432	09	Surprising encounters	Rencontres surprenantes	March-18-2018
433	10	Trap and decision	Piège et décision	March-24-2018
434	11	Unexpected encounter	Rencontre inattendue	March-25-2018
435	12	Hostages	Otages	March-31-2018
436	13	Chain complication	Complication en chaîne	April-01-2018
437	14	Surprise departure	Départ surprise	April-07-2018
438	15	Nashville 2	Nashville 2	April-08-2018
439	16	Unexpected news	Nouvelle inattendue	April-14-2018
440	17	Traps and surprises	Pièges et surprises	April-15-2018
441	18	Murphy's law	La loi de Murphy	April-21-2018
442	19	Sad Surprises	Tristes Surprises	April-22-2018
443	20	Multiple requests	Demandes multiples	April-28-2018
444	21	Outcomes	Dénouements	April-29-2018
445	22	Sad return	Triste retour	May-06-2018
446	23	Supreme sacrifices	Suprêmes sacrifices	May-12-2018
447	24	Solitudes	Solitudes	May-13-2018
448	25	The eyes of love	Les yeux de l'amour	May-19-2018
449	26	New danger	Nouveau danger	May-20-2018

=== Season 18 (2018) ===
#	Episode	Title	French title	Air date
450	01	A new star	Une nouvelle étoile	May-26-2018
451	02	R1 Superstar	R1 Superstar	May-27-2018
452	03	The revenge of a dead person	La vengeance d'un mort	June-02-2018
453	04	Malignant night	Nuit maligne	June-03-2018
454	05	Key messages	Messages déterminants	June-09-2018
455	06	Blows of Fate (Multiple Lies)	Coups du sort (Mensonges multiples)	June-10-2018
456	07	Backfire	Retour de flamme	June-16-2018
457	08	Laughter and tears	Des rires et des larmes	June-17-2018
458	09	Ramped back	Rentrée agitée	September-02-2018
459	10	Fortuitous meeting	Rencontre fortuite	September-09-2018
460	11	Weddings and worries	Mariages et inquiétudes	September-15-2018
461	12	Various complications	Complications diverses	September-16-2018
462	13	Evidence and proofs	Preuves et épreuves	September-22-2018
463	14	Exhausted	À bout de forces	September-23-2018
464	15	Saving images	Images salvatrices	September-29-2018
465	16	Fatale meets	Fatale rencontre	September-30-2018
466	17	Heavy consequences	Lourdes conséquences	October-06-2018
467	18	Fatal error	Erreur fatale	October-07-2018
468	19	A tomorrows that cry	Des lendemains qui pleurent	October-13-2018
469	20	Miraculous	Miraculeux	October-14-2018
470	21	Immediate threat	Menace immédiate	October-20-2018
471	22	Rumors	Rumeurs	October-21-2018
472	23	Back to the sources	Retour aux sources	October-27-2018
473	24	Various thoughts	Pensées diverses	October-28-2018
474	25	Double joy, double punishment	Double joie, double peine	November-03-2018
475	26	Dramatic comedies	Comédies dramatiques	November-04-2018

=== Season 19 (2018-2019) ===
#	Episode	Title	French title	Air date
476	01	Forgotten threat	Menace oubliée	November-10-2018
477	02	Jealousy	Jalousie	November-11-2018
478	03	Tender confession	Tendre aveu	November-17-2018
479	04	Trapped	Prise au piège	November-18-2018
480	05	Burning love	Amour brûlant	November-24-2018
481	06	Lightning new	Foudroyante nouvelle	November-25-2018
482	07	Dark projects	Sombres projets	December-01-2018
483	08	Confidences and jealousies	Confidences et jalousies	December-02-2018
484	09	Radio pursuit	Radio poursuite	December-08-2018
485	10	Traps and ambushes	Pièges et embuscades	December-09-2018
486	11	Double misunderstanding	Double méprise	December-15-2018
487	12	Change of ownership	Changement de propriétaire	December-16-2018
488	13	In full gas	À plein gaz	January-13-2019
489	14	Meeting of the second type	Rencontre du deuxième type	January-27-2019
490	15	Spied	Épiée	February-03-2019
491	16	Stolen photos	Photos volées	February-10-2019
492	17	Execution	Exécution	February-16-2019
493	18	Passion perverse	Passion perverse	February-17-2019
494	19	Dangers in the night	Dangers dans la nuit	February-23-2019
495	20	Deadly blackmail	Chantage fatal	February-24-2019
496	21	Wonder Fanny	Wonder Fanny	March-02-2019
497	22	Fatal record	Dossier fatal	March-03-2019
498	23	Smiles and tears	Des sourires et des larmes	March-09-2019
499	24	Right-of-way and mistakes	Emprises et méprises	March-10-2019
500	25	Multiple concerns	Multiples inquiétudes	March-16-2019
501	26	Dangerous hesitations	Hésitations dangereuses	March-17-2019

=== Season 20 (2019) ===
#	Episode	Title	French title	Air date
502	01	In family	En famille	March-23-2019
503	02	Love story	Love story	March-30-2019
504	03	Macabre threats	Macabres menaces	March-31-2019
505	04	Marriage and paternity	Mariage et paternité	April-06-2019
506	05	The ghost	La revenante	April-07-2019
507	06	Princely return	Retour princier	April-13-2019
508	07	Vengeance from beyond the grave	Vengeance d'outre-tombe	April-14-2019
509	08	Convincing methods	Des méthodes convaincantes	April-20-2019
510	09	The revenge of a brunette	La vengeance d’une brune	April-21-2019
511	10	A new love	Un nouvel amour	April-27-2019
512	11	Settlement of accounts	Règlements de comptes	April-28-2019
513	12	The end of a myth	La fin d’un mythe	May-04-2019
514	13	Like the Phoenix	Tel le Phoenix	May-05-2019
515	14	Cut	Coupez	May-11-2019
516	15	Open book	A livre ouvert	May-12-2019
517	16	Plotting	Complots	May-19-2019
518	17	Dangerous cross-hunt	Chassés croisés dangereux	May-19-2019
519	18	Near the goal	Tout près du but	May-25-2019
520	19	Forgery and use of forgery	Faux et usage de faux	May-26-2019
521	20	Rebirths	Renaissances	June-01-2019
522	21	For our homeland	Pour notre patrie	June-02-2019
523	22	New departures	Nouveaux départs	August-25-2019
524	23	Love and lies	Amour et mensonges	August-31-2019
525	24	Salutary meditation	Méditation salutaire	September-01-2019
526	25	Difficult negotiations	Négociations difficiles	September-07-2019
527	26	The sacrifice of a father	Le sacrifice d’un père	September-08-2019

=== Season 21 (2019) ===
#	Episode	Title	French title	Air date
528	01	Royal performance	Royale performance	September-14-2019
529	02	The taste of danger	Le goût du danger	September-15-2019
530	03	Under control	Sous contrôle	September-21-2019
531	04	Embraces and surprises	Emprises et surprises	September-22-2019
532	05	Hypnotic shock	Choc hypnotique	September-28-2019
533	06	Party preparations	Préparatifs de fêtes	September-29-2019
534	07	Marriage at risk, Part One	Mariage en péril, première partie	September-29-2019
535	08	Marriage at risk, Part Two	Mariage en péril, deuxième partie	September-29-2019
536	09	The son of the sun	le fils du soleil	October-05-2019
537	10	A world to save	Un monde à sauver	October-06-2019
538	11	The shadow of the demons	L'ombre des démons	October-12-2019
539	12	Following the eagle	En suivant l’aigle	October-19-2019
540	13	Difficult admissions	Aveux difficiles	October-20-2019
541	14	By fire	Par le feu	October-26-2019
542	15	Apocalypse soon	Apocalypse bientôt	October-27-2019
543	16	Never won!	Jamais gagné !	November-02-2019
544	17	Need escapes	Besoin d'évasions	November-09-2019
545	18	Odd and father	Impair et père	November-10-2019
546	19	Love, happiness and betrayals	Amour, bonheur et trahisons	November-16-2019
547	20	The forgotten talisman	La talisman oublié	November-17-2019
548	21	Requested execution	Exécution demandée	November-23-2019
549	22	Deadly gas	Gaz mortel	November-24-2019
550	23	Reason of state	Raison d’état	November-30-2019
551	24	A surprising love	Un amour surprenant	December-01-2019
552	25	Surprising romance	Surprenante romance	December-07-2019
553	26	Sighs and feelings	Soupirs et sentiments	December-08-2019

=== Season 22 (2019-2020) ===
#	Episode	Title	French title	Air date
554	01	Permanent Dangers	Dangers Permanents	December-14-2019
555	02	Demons and wonders	Démons et merveilles	December-15-2019
556	03	In the sheepfold	Dans la bergerie	January-12-2020
557	04	Explosive threat	Menace explosive	January-19-2020
558	05	Unexpected return	Retour Imprévu	January-26-2020
559	06	Unplanned prosecution	Poursuite imprévue	February-02-2020
560	07	Blatant delusions	Délires flagrants	February-09-2020
561	08	Serial concerns	Inquiétudes en série	February-16-2020
562	09	Target error	Erreur de cible	February-22-2020
563	10	Catches, retention, mistakes and surprises	Prises, emprises, méprises et surprises	February-23-2020
564	11	Suspected suspect	Suspect écarté	February-29-2020
565	12	Mysteries and prayers	Mystères et prières	March-01-2020
566	13	In the heat of the night	Dans la chaleur de la nuit	March-07-2020
567	14	Sisters and stupor	Soeurs et stupeur	March-08-2020
568	15	Immense sorrows	Immenses Tristesses	March-14-2020
569	16	False brothers	Faux frères	March-15-2020
570	17	Fatal revelations	Fatales révélations	March-22-2020
571	18	Turning situations	Retournements de situations	March-29-2020
572	19	Blood and tears	Du sang et des larmes	April-05-2020
573	20	Releases	Releases	April-12-2020
574	21	Multiple dangers	Multiples dangers	April-19-2020
575	22	Multiple complications	Multiples complications	April-26-2020
576	23	Actions and reactions	Actions et réactions	May-03-2020
577	24	Double drama	Double drame	May-10-2020
578	25	Sad losses	Tristes pertes	May-17-2020
579	26	Uncertain futures	Futurs incertains	May-24-2020

=== Season 23 (2020) ===
#	Episode	Title	French title	Air date
580	01	Of hearts and hearts	De cœurs et cœurs	May-31-2020
581	02	Efforts and comforts	Efforts et réconforts	June-07-2020
582	03	Serious accusations	Graves accusations	June-14-2020
583	04	In the sweetness of the night	Dans la douceur de la nuit	June-21-2020
584	05	False joys	Fausses joies	June-28-2020
585	06	Relapses of all kinds	Rechutes en tous genres	July-05-2020
586	07	Hopes and despair	Espoirs et désespoirs	August-23-2020
587	08	Operative shock	Choc opératoire	August-23-2020
588	09	Tender evolutions	Tendres évolutions	August-23-2020
589	10	Doubts and revelations	Doutes et révélations	August-30-2020
590	11	A burning love	Un amour brûlant	September-05-2020
591	12	Dangerous confessions	Dangereuses confessions	September-06-2020
592	13	pray for us	Priez pour nous	September-12-2020
593	14	Serial complications	Complications en série	September-13-2020
594	15	Bad starts	Mauvais départs	September-19-2020
595	16	Dangerous selfie	Selfie dangereux	September-20-2020
596	17	Revenge and revenge	Revanche et vengeance	September-26-2020
597	18	Night hazards	Dangers nocturnes	September-27-2020
598	19	God's hand	La main de Dieu	October-03-2020
599	20	One for the other	L’un pour l’autre	October-04-2020
600	21	Burning night	Nuit brûlante	October-10-2020
601	22	Flaming love	Amour enflammé	October-17-2020
602	23	Personal messages	Messages personnels	October-18-2020
603	24	Woman return	Retour de femme	October-24-2020
604	25	Double lie	Double mensonge	October-25-2020
605	26	Eternal love	Un amour éternel	October-31-2020

=== Season 24 (2020-2021) ===
#	Episode	Title	French title	Air date
606	01	Doctor Blake	Docteur Blake	November-01-2020
607	02	Disturbing memories	Souvenirs troublants	November-07-2020
608	03	Research and development	Recherches et développements	November-08-2020
609	04	Temporary breaks	Ruptures temporaires	November-14-2020
610	05	Internal conflicts	Conflits internes	November-15-2020
611	06	Finds and reunions	Trouvailles et retrouvailles	November-21-2020
612	07	Improvised filming	Tournage improvisé	November-22-2020
613	08	Pitfalls and conflicts	Pièges et conflits	November-28-2020
614	09	Requests and questions	Demandes et questions	November-29-2020
615	10	Flagrant offenses	Délits flagrants	December-05-2020
616	11	Dissension	Dissensions	December-06-2020
617	12	Confessions and marriages	Aveux et mariages	December-12-2020
618	13	Incredible break	Incroyable rupture	December-13-2020
619	14	Christmas soon	Bientôt Noël	December-19-2020
620	15	A Christmas Together (Part 1)	Un Noël tous ensemble (Partie 1)	December-20-2020
621	16	A Christmas Together (Part 2)	Un Noël tous ensemble (Partie 2)	December-20-2020
622	17	General recovery	Reprise générale	January-09-2021
623	18	Too bad for him	Tant pis pour lui	January-10-2021
624	19	Love at first sight	Coup de foudre	January-16-2021
625	20	Jealousies	Jalousies	January-17-2021
626	21	Alternative solutions	Solutions alternatives	January-23-2021
627	22	Day after parties	Lendemain de fêtes	January-30-2021
628	23	Resignation	Démission	January-31-2021
629	24	Unceremoniously	Sans ménagement	February-06-2021
630	25	Departure and arrival	Départ et arrivée	February-07-2021
631	26	The beautiful story	La belle histoire	February-13-2021

=== Season 25 (2021) ===
#	Episode	Title	French title	Air date
632	01	Saint Valentine's Day	Saint Valentin	February-14-2021
633	02	Lovers' day	La fête des amoureux	February-20-2021
634	03	Divorce	Divorce	February-21-2021
635	04	All-round	Tous azimuts	February-27-2021
636	05	Unconditional freedom	Liberté inconditionnelle	February-28-2021
637	06	Expected results	Résultats attendus	March-06-2021
638	07	Unexpected phenomena	Phénomènes inattendus	March-07-2021
639	08	Impediments in series	Empêchements en série	March-13-2021
640	09	Surprising results	Résultats surprenants	March-14-2021
641	10	Family reunion	Regroupement familial	March-20-2021
642	11	Taken hostage	Pris en otages	March-21-2021
643	12	New complications	Nouvelles complications	March-27-2021
644	13	A few minutes away	A quelques minutes près	March-28-2021
645	14	Decision impossible	Décision impossible	April-03-2021
646	15	Night of drunkenness, tenderness	Nuit d'ivresse, de tendresse	April-04-2021
647	16	One day I let you go	Un jour je t’ai laissé partir	April-10-2021
648	17	Climate change	Changement de climat	April-11-2021
649	18	Under hypnosis	Sous hypnose	April-17-2021
650	19	Return to Fryars Bay	Retour à Fryars Bay	April-18-2021
651	20	Budding friendship	Amitié naissante	April-24-2021
652	21	Painful announcement	Douloureuse annonce	April-25-2021
653	22	Mysteries at Love Island	Mystères à Love Island	May-01-2021
654	23	Multiple eliminations	Multiples éliminations	May-02-2021
655	24	Planned disappearances	Disparitions programmées	May-08-2021
656	25	Terrible machinations	Terribles machinations	May-09-2021
657	26	Star hour	L’heure des étoiles	May-15-2021

=== Season 26 (2021) ===
#	Episode	Title	French title	Air date
658	01	Surprise lovers	Amoureux surprise	May-16-2021
659	02	Collapse	Effondrement	May-22-2021
660	03	Departure and return	Départ et retour	May-23-2021
661	04	Road accidents	Accidents de parcours	May-29-2021
662	05	Love and poetry	Amour et poésie	May-30-2021
663	06	Desires of children	Désirs d'enfants	June-05-2021
664	07	In midair	En plein ciel	June-12-2021
665	08	Reliefs	Soulagements	June-13-2021
666	09	Unexpected return	Retour inattendu	June-19-2021
667	10	A faithful friend	Une amie fidèle	June-20-2021
668	11	Memories of times gone by	Souvenirs du temps passé	June-26-2021
669	12	At the starting point	Au point de départ	June-27-2021
670	13	Lovingly yours	Amoureusement vôtre	August-22-2021
671	14	Flames of Passion	Les flammes de la passion	August-28-2021
672	15	Reincarnation	Réincarnation	August-29-2021
673	16	And even though I feel sorry	Et même si j’ai de la peine	September-04-2021
674	17	Surprise arrest	Arrestation surprise	September-05-2021
675	18	Smiles and betrayals	Sourires et trahisons	September-11-2021
676	19	False leads	Fausses pistes	September-12-2021
677	20	Blood brother	Frère de sang	September-18-2021
678	21	Serial hostages	Otages en série	September-19-2021
679	22	End of career	Fin de carrière	September-25-2021
680	23	Comedy comedies	Comédie comédies	September-26-2021
681	24	Binary and non-binary	Binaire et non binaire	October-02-2021
682	25	Rehearsals	Répétitions	October-03-2021
683	26	Starting point	Point de départ	October-09-2021

=== Season 27 (2021-2022) ===
#	Episode	Title	French title	Air date
684	01	Problems on display	Problèmes à l’affiche	October-10-2021
685	02	An extraordinary party	Une fête extraordinaire	October-16-2021
686	03	Police police police	Police police police	October-17-2021
687	04	Worrying news	Nouvelles inquiétantes	October-23-2021
688	05	Intrusions	Intrusions	October-24-2021
689	06	Poker shot	Coup de poker	October-30-2021
690	07	Night of drunkenness	Nuit d'ivresse	October-31-2021
691	08	Hands in the air	les mains en l’air	November-06-2021
692	09	Night Perils	Périls nocturnes	November-07-2021
693	10	Money change	Monnaie d’échange	November-13-2021
694	11	My daughter my treasure	Ma fille mon trésor	November-14-2021
695	12	Anguish at Love Island	Angoisse à Love Island	November-20-2021
696	13	Night decision	Décision nocturne	November-21-2021
697	14	Mysterious explosion	Mystérieuse explosion	November-27-2021
698	15	Poetry in danger	Poésie en danger	November-28-2021
699	16	Mission and resignation	Mission et démission	December-04-2021
700	17	The shadow of dishonor	L'ombre du déshonneur	December-05-2021
701	18	Cascading problems	Problèmes en cascade	December-11-2021
702	19	Waiting for Christmas	En attendant Noël	December-12-2021
703	20	One Santa Too Many, Part 1	Un père noël de trop, partie 1	December-18-2021
704	21	One Santa Too Many, Part 2	Un père noël de trop, partie 2	December-19-2021
705	22	Dark presentiments	Sombres pressentiments	January-08-2022
706	23	Corridor noises	Bruits de couloirs	January-09-2022
707	24	Case of conscience	Cas de conscience	January-15-2022
708	25	Loss of consciousness	Perte de connaissance	January-16-2022
709	26	The night of mysteries	La nuit des mystères	January-22-2022

=== Season 28 (2022) ===
#	Episode	Title	French title	Air date
710	01	Brutal confession	Aveu brutal	January-23-2022
711	02	Maybe not	Peut-être pas	January-29-2022
712	03	Return of holiday	Retour de fête	January-30-2022
713	04	Rainbow and diamonds	Arc en ciel et diamants	February-05-2022
714	05	Separate departures	Départs séparés	February-12-2022
715	06	Brussels	Bruxelles	February-13-2022
716	07	Sad journey	Triste voyage	February-19-2022
717	08	The sad story	La triste histoire	February-20-2022
718	09	Persistent danger	Danger persistant	February-26-2022
719	10	Once again	Encore une fois	February-27-2022
720	11	Unveiled	Dévoilée	March-05-2022
721	12	Impending revenge	Vengeance imminente	March-06-2022
722	13	Unforeseen reversals	Retournements imprévus	March-12-2022
723	14	Host family	Famille d'accueil	March-13-2022
724	15	Close to the sky	Tout près du ciel	March-19-2022
725	16	The time of suspicion	Le temps des soupçons	March-20-2022
726	17	I kill... them (Girls)	Je tue... elles	March-26-2022
727	18	Unexpected concert	Concert inattendu	March-27-2022
728	19	Dangerous return	Dangereux retour	April-02-2022
729	20	It's good to come back	C'est bon de revenir	April-03-2022
730	21	Research and meditation	Recherches et méditation	April-09-2022
731	22	Loves, prayers and danger	Amours, prières et danger	April-10-2022
732	23	Rescue at sea	Sauvetage en mer	April-16-2022
733	24	Disturbing coincidence	Troublante coïncidence	April-17-2022
734	25	Dangerous Bouquet	Dangereux bouquet	April-23-2022
735	26	At last!	Enfin!	April-24-2022

=== Season 29 (2018) ===
#	Episode	Title	French title	Air date
736	01	Tender birthday	Tendre anniversaire	April-30-2022
737	02	Sweet confessions and disavowals	Doux aveux et désaveux	May-01-2022
738	03	Double I	Double Je	May-07-2022
739	04	Dramatic explanation	Dramatique explication	May-08-2022
740	05	New Hazards	Nouveaux dangers	May-14-2022
741	06	In duet	En duo	May-15-2022
742	07	From one to the other	De l'une aux autres	May-22-2022
743	08	Triple play	Triple jeu	May-28-2022
744	09	Unplanned rescue	Sauvetage imprévu	May-29-2022
745	10	Stars and asteroid	Etoiles et astéroide	June-04-2022
746	11	Delayed removal	Enlèvement retard	June-05-2022
747	12	Marriage in danger	Mariage en danger	June-11-2022
748	13	Like a bouquet of flowers	Comme un bouquet de fleurs	June-12-2022
749	14	Terror to all hostages	Terreur à tous les otages	June-18-2022
750	15	Dangerous Amazons	Amazones dangereuses	June-19-2022
751	16	Abductions and release	Enlèvements et libération	June-25-2022
752	17	In all directions	Dans tous les sens	June-26-2022
753	18	Wedding?	Mariage?	July-03-2022
754	19	Back to school eventful	Rentrée mouvementée	August-28-2022
755	20	Under surveillance	Sous surveillance	September-04-2022
756	21	Quadruple game	Quatruple jeu	September-10-2022
757	22	Danger in Nashville	Danger à Nashville	September-11-2022
758	23	The handyman	L'homme à tout faire	September-17-2022
759	24	Disturbing vision	Troublante vision	September-18-2022
760	25	End of Game	Fin du jeu	September-24-2022
761	26	Explosive	Explosif	September-25-2022

=== Season 30 (2022-2023) ===
#	Episode	Title	French title	Air date
762	01	Fatal outcome	Dénouement fatal	October-01-2022
763	02	Only one being is missing	Un seul être vous manque	October-02-2022
764	03	The forces of the street	Les forces de la rue	October-08-2022
765	04	The court of miracles	La cour des miracles	October-09-2022
766	05	Between dogs and wolves	Entre chiens et loups	October-15-2022
767	06	Unscheduled stop	Arrêt imprévu	October-16-2022
768	07	Good and bad news	Bonnes et mauvaises nouvelles	October-22-2022
769	08	Looking for brother and sister	Recherche frère et soeur	October-23-2022
770	09	Research and discoveries	Recherches et découvertes	October-29-2022
771	10	Leaked memory	Mémoire en fuite	October-30-2022
772	11	Dangerous vision	Dangereuse vision	November-05-2022
773	12	Planned assaults	Assauts programmés	November-06-2022
774	13	Like brother and sister	Comme frère et soeur	November-12-2022
775	14	Prediction realized	Prédiction réalisée	November-19-2022
776	15	Fatal friendships	Amitiés fatales	November-20-2022
777	16	Jail for cops	Prison pour flics	November-26-2022
778	17	Storm for a bracelet	Tempête pour un bracelet	November-27-2022
779	18	Return of flames	Retour de flammes	December-03-2022
780	19	One problem less	Un problème en moins	December-04-2022
781	20	Final preparations	Derniers préparatifs	December-10-2022
782	21	In concert	En concert	December-11-2022
783	22	Replay	Replay	December-17-2022
784	23	Reunion	Retrouvailles	December-18-2022
785	24	Basic instinct	l’instinct basique	January-07-2023
786	25	Colombian Angel	L’ange de Colombie	January-08-2023
787	26	The sad end	La triste fin	January-14-2023

=== Season 31 (2023) ===
#	Episode	Title	French title	Air date
788	01	Love in detention	L’amour en détention	January-15-2023
789	02	Disturbing memories	Souvenirs troublants	January-21-2023
790	03	All together	Tous ensemble	January-22-2023
791	04	Prisoner	Prisonnier	January-28-2023
792	05	Charges (Dangerous Contract)	Accusations (Contrat dangereux)	January-29-2023
793	06	Serial problems	Problèmes en série	February-04-2023
794	07	Nefarious vision	Vision néfaste	February-05-2023
795	08	Mandatory distrust	Méfiance obligatoire	February-11-2023
796	09	Tests and proofs	Épreuves et preuves	February-12-2023
797	10	Research group	Groupe de recherches	February-18-2023
798	11	Complications	Complications	February-19-2023
799	12	Explosive revelation	Révélation explosive	February-25-2023
800	13	Jealousies	Jalousies	February-26-2023
801	14	Perfumes	Parfums	March-04-2023
802	15	Sounds and smells	Des sons et des odeurs	March-05-2023
803	16	Double revelation	Double révélation	March-11-2023
804	17	Camouflages irreplaceable	Camouflages indispensables	March-12-2023
805	18	Research at the summit	Recherches au sommet	March-18-2023
806	19	Radical solution	Solution radicale	March-19-2023
807	20	New stroke of fate	Nouveau coup du sort	March-25-2023
808	21	Confrontations	Affrontements	March-26-2023
809	22	Drop the masks	Bas les masques	April-01-2023
810	23	Unforeseen outcomes	Dénouements imprévus	April-02-2023
811	24	Rewards and punishments	Récompenses et punitions	April-08-2023
812	25	Imminent results	Résultats imminents	April-09-2023
813	26	Arrest	Arrestation	April-15-2023

=== Season 32 (2023) ===
#	Episode	Title	French title	Air date
814	01	Handjob fight	Branle-bas de combat	April-16-2023
815	02	All for Helen	Tous pour Hélène	April-22-2023
816	03	Dangerous hunt	Traque dangereuse	April-23-2023
817	04	Mad love	Un amour fou	April-29-2023
818	05	Dangerous shore	Dangereux rivage	April-30-2023
819	06	Nashville or not Nashville?	Nashville or not Nashville ?	May-06-2023
820	07	The lost child	L'enfant perdu	May-07-2023
821	08	Multiple conflicts	Conflits multiples	May-13-2023
822	09	Nashville rock	Nashville rock	May-14-2023
823	10	Last kiss	Dernier baiser	May-20-2023
824	11	Research	Recherches	May-21-2023
825	12	Cockfight	Bataille de coqs	May-27-2023
826	13	New York, New York	New York, New York	May-28-2023
827	14	Such in love who believed to take	Tel épris qui croyait prendre	June-03-2023
828	15	Deadly accident	Accident mortel	June-04-2023
829	16	Returns in Paris	Retours Paris	June-10-2023
830	17	Analyzes	Analyses	June-11-2023
831	18	Bad news	Mauvaises nouvelles	June-17-2023
832	19	Fake friends	Faux amis	June-18-2023
833	20	Impossible decision	Impossible décision	June-25-2023
834	21	Family pictures	Photos de famille	July-02-2023
835	22	Medication	Médicament	July-09-2023
836	23	Provisional image	Image provisoire	July-16-2023
837	24	Gambling debt	Dette de jeu	July-23-2023
838	25	A terrifying grandmother	Une grand-mère terrifiante	July-30-2023
839	26	Daddy or not	Papa ou pas	August-06-2023

=== Season 33 (2023-2024) ===
#	Episode	Title	French title	Air date
840	01	Double disappearance	Double disparition	August-13-2023
841	02	Unanswered calls	Appels sans réponse	August-20-2023
842	03	Without news	Sans nouvelles	August-27-2023
843	04	Usurpation of Identity	Usurpation d’identité	September-03-2023
844	05	Incredible betrayal	Incroyable trahison	September-10-2023
845	06	Reversal of the situation	Revers de situation	September-17-2023
846	07	Confessions and wishes	Aveux et voeux	September-24-2023
847	08	Babies	Bébés	October-01-2023
848	09	Quarrels and quarrels	Brouille et embrouilles	October-08-2023
849	10	First kiss	Premier baiser	October-15-2023
850	11	Selfie dirty girl	Selfie sale fille	October-22-2023
851	12	The wolf in the sheepfold	Le loup dans la bergerie	October-29-2023
852	13	Back to the source	Retour à la source	November-05-2023
853	14	Praying is not winning	Prier n’est pas gagner	November-12-2023
854	15	New story	Nouvelle histoire	November-19-2023
855	16	Emergency departure	Départ d’urgence	November-26-2023
856	17	Overwhelming evidence	Preuves accablantes	December-03-2023
857	18	Breakups	Ruptures	December-10-2023
858	19	The Christmas of Love - Part 1	Le Noël de l'amour - 1ère partie	December-10-2023
859	20	The Christmas of Love - Part 2	Le Noël de l'amour - 2ème partie	December-10-2023
860	21	Restless return	Retour agité	December-17-2023
861	22	Double ending	Double fin	January-07-2024
862	23	Police custody	Garde à vue	January-14-2024
863	24	Statement	Déclaration	January-21-2024
864	25	Father fusion	Père fusion	January-28-2024
865	26	Everything is almost fine	Tout va presque bien	February-04-2024

=== Season 34 (2024) ===
#	Episode	Title	French title	Air date
866	01	Valentine's Day 2024	Saint Valentin 2024	February-11-2024
867	02	Meeting a different type	Rencontre d’un autre type	February-18-2024
868	03	Warrior of love	Guerrier de l'amour	February-25-2024
869	04	Golden ticket	Golden ticket	March-3-2024
870	05	Message in mid-flight	Message en plein vol	March-10-2024
871	06	Dangerous games	Jeux dangereux	March-17-2024
872	07	Amazing results	Résultats étonnants	March-24-2024
873	08	Night chase	Poursuite nocturne	March-31-2024
874	09	Unexpected decision	Décision inattendue	April-7-2024
875	10	Return and detour	Retour et détour	April-14-2024
876	11	Change of partner	Changement de partenaire	April-21-2024
877	12	Intimate dinners	Dîners intimes	April-28-2024
878	13	Like rookies	Comme des bleus	May-5-2024
879	14	Unbearable	Insupportable	May-12-2024
880	15	Crossed sorrows	Chagrins croisés	May-19-2024
881	16	Births and rebirth	Naissances et renaissance	May-26-2024
882	17	Last sequence	Dernière séquence	June-2-2024
883	18	No mercy	Sans pitié	June-9-2024
884	19	Family reunion	Réunion de famille	June-16-2024
885	20	New artists	Nouveaux artistes	June-23-2024
886	21	Change of life	Changement de vie	June-30-2024
887	22	Personal conflict	Conflit personnel	July-7-2024
888	23	Fatal blow	Coup fatal	July-14-2024
889	24	Hunted!	Traquée !	July-21-2024
890	25	Rumors in the corridor	Bruits de couloir	July-28-2024
891	26	In the name of the brother	Au nom du frère	August-4-2024

=== Season 35 (2024-2025) ===
#	Episode	Title	French title	Air date
892	01	Surprise surprises	Surprise surprises	August-11-2024
893	02	Let the music play	En avant la musique	August-18-2024
894	03	Serious mistake	Faute grave	August-25-2024
895	04	Life is beautiful	La vie est belle	September-1-2024
896	05	Brutal disappearance	Brutale disparition	September-8-2024
897	06	Computer portrait	Portrait robot	September-15-2024
898	07	Savage!	Sauvage !	September-22-2024
899	08	Silence is golden	Le silence est d'or	September-29-2024
900	09	Double anguish	Double angoisse	October-6-2024
901	10	Double declaration	Double déclaration	October-13-2024
902	11	Inevitable catastrophe	Inévitable catastrophe	October-20-2024
903	12	Costa Rica	Costa Rica	October-27-2024
904	13	Like father	Tel père	November-3-2024
905	14	Truth restored	Vérité rétablie	November-10-2024
906	15	The schemer	L'intrigante	November-17-2024
907	16	Under the throat	Sous la gorge	November-24-2024
908	17	At knives drawn	A couteaux tirés	December-1-2024
909	18	Fatal hold	Fatale emprise	December-8-2024
910	19	Under the spell	Sous le charme	December-15-2024
911	20	If we got married at Christmas - Part 1	Si on se mariait à Noël - 1ère partie	December-22-2024
912	21	If we got married at Christmas - Part 2	Si on se mariait à Noël - 2ème partie	December-22-2024
913	22	If we got married at Christmas - Part 3	Si on se mariait à Noël - 3ème partie	December-22-2024
914	23	Backtracking	Retour en arrière	December-29-2024
915	24	A new year	Une nouvelle année	January-5-2025
916	25	Battle of love	Bataille d'amour	January-12-2025
917	26	Serial disappearances	Disparitions en série	January-19-2025

=== Season 36 (2025) ===
#	Episode	Title	French title	Air date
918	01	Double search	Double recherche	January-26-2025
919	02	Unexpected declaration	Déclaration inattendue	February-2-2025
920	03	Gold fever	La fièvre de l'or	February-9-2025
921	04	Happy news	Heureuses nouvelles	February-16-2025
922	05	Cha Cha Chat	Cha Cha Chat	February-23-2025
923	06	Stolen Images	Images volées	March-2-2025
924	07	Compromised marriage	Mariage compromis	March-9-2025
925	08	Strange jealousy	Etrange jalousie	March-16-2025
926	09	Perverse manipulations	Perverses manipulations	March-23-2025
927	10	Serial deceptions	Tromperies en série	March-30-2025
928	11	Double surprise	Double surprise	April-6-2025
929	12	In a duel	En duel	April-13-2025
930	13	Ideal profile	Profil idéal	April-20-2025
931	14	Conflicts	Conflits	April-27-2025
932	15	Tears and alarms	Larmes et alarmes	May-4-2025
933	16	Surprising proposal	Proposition surprenante	May-11-2025
934	17	Romantic encounter	Rencontre sentimentale	May-18-2025
935	18	Conquer and convince	Vaincre et convaincre	May-25-2025
936	19	Together	Ensemble	June-1-2025
937	20	Finally in the know	Enfin au courant	June-8-2025
938	21	Triumphant concert	Concert triomphal	June-15-2025
939	22	The day after	Le jour d'après	June-22-2025
940	23	Among friends	Entre amis	July-6-2025
941	24	Fatal weakness	Fatale faiblesse	July-13-2025
942	25	Shocks	Chocs	July-20-2025
943	26	Curious wiretaps	Ecoutes indiscrètes	August-3-2025

=== Season 37 (2025) ===
#	Episode	Title	French title	Air date
944	01	On the road again	On the road again	August-10-2025
945	02	Change of atmosphere	Changement d'ambiance	August-17-2025
946	03	Multiple questions	Multiples questions	August-31-2025
947	04	The good news	La bonne nouvelle	September-7-2025
948	05	Strange change	Etrange changement	September-21-2025
949	06	Sweet night	Douce nuit	September-28-2025
950	07	Suspicions and jealousies	Soupçons et jalousies	October-5-2025
951	08	Between sky and sea	Entre ciel et mer	October-12-2025
952	09	On a beach in summer	Sur une plage en été	October-19-2025
953	10	Strange kiss	Etrange baiser	October-26-2025
954	11	From party to party	De fête en fête	November-2-2025
955	12	Double revelations	Doubles révélations	November-9-2025
956	13	Remorse	Remords	November-16-2025
957	14	Abusive contract	Contrat abusif	November-23-2025
958	15	Sad realization	Triste constatation	November-30-2025
959	16	Danger on the beach	Danger sur la plage	December-7-2025
960	17	The demons of the night	Les démons de la nuit	December-14-2025
961	18	Double return	Double retour	December-21-2025
962	19	Happy ending	Heureux dénouement	December-21-2025
963	20	Last Christmas - Part 1	Last Christmas - 1ère partie	December-21-2025
964	21	Last Christmas - Part 2	Last Christmas - 2ème partie	December-21-2025
965	22	Friends forever - Part 1	Amis pour toujours - 1ère partie	December-28-2025
966	23	Friends forever - Part 2	Amis pour toujours - 2ème partie	December-28-2025
