= Babsie Steger =

- Born: 1968 (age 57–58); Waidhofen an der Ybbs, Lower Austria, Austria
- Occupations: Dancer; singer; television actress; television presenter
- Years active: 1988–present
- Television: Les pâtisseries de Babsie
- Website: babsie-steger.com

Babsie Steger (born 1968) is an Austrian television actress, dancer, singer and television presenter.

== Biography ==
Babsie Steger was born in Waidhofen an der Ybbs in Lower Austria. She left her native Austria at age 18 after studying classical dance at the Vienna State Opera, where she worked with Rudolf Nureyev, Mikhail Baryshnikov in the ballets of Maurice Béjart. She arrived in France studying at the École de Danse Princesse Grace in Monaco with prestigious teachers like Mariska Besobrasova. She then came to Paris learning French and Italian while working as a dancer and model. She appeared in fashion shows and advertisements, and took theater classes with John Strasberg at the Actors Studio.

Her first job was a classical dancer and permitted her to know well the human body and the correct way to feed herself. She has always been interested on dietetic and the welfare, and thus for over 20 years. She founded in 2003 a restaurant in Paris, where she tested for the first time her Austrian pastry recipes, which later appeared in 2011 in her book Strudel, Kouglof et Cie.

== Career ==
A few months after arriving in Paris, she was engaged as a dancer in the television series Palace. She was noticed by Jean-Luc Azoulay who then engaged her to portray the role of Hilguegue in the series Salut les Musclés, which was declining. The series became successful once again and Babsie Steger became very famous. After over a hundred episodes broadcast until 1994, the series were re-titled La Croisière foll'amour and still with the same actors. This spin-off of Salut les Musclés was also successful until 1997 on TF1.

In 1993, she became a singer at AB Groupe with the single "Dance with Me", which permitted her to perform live during the first part of the concert s of Hélène Rollès at the Zénith de Paris and on tour in France in autumn 1993. She later released two singles, "Juste un petit peu d'amour" and "Le Yaya".

She is also known for her minor roles in French television series where she played along with Roger Hanin, Pierre Arditi, Charlotte Gainsbourg, Gérard Depardieu, Bernard Le Coq, Pierre Mondy, Mimie Mathy, Patrick Timsit and many others. She has appeared in series such as Navarro, Le G.R.E.C., Fabien Cosma (2005), L'Été rouge, Joséphine, ange gardien, Nestor Burma (2003), Père et Maire (2003), Le fond de l'air est frais (2004), Le Proc (2004–06), Commissaire Moulin (2005), Avocats et Associés (2005) and Désiré Landru (2005).

In addition to her acting career, Babsie Steger is also a television presenter on the channels IDF1 and Vivolta from 2008 to 2012. She presents from 2012 to 2013 the pastry program Les pâtisseries de Babsie on channels Chérie 25 and Cuisine+.

== Filmography ==
Year	Title	Role	Director	Notes
1988	Palace	Dancer	Jean-Michel Ribes	TV series (1 episode)
1989–94	Salut les musclés	Hilguegue	Jean-Pierre Spiero, Gérard Espinasse, ...	TV series (263 episodes)
1993	Famille fou rire	Hilguegue	Jacques Samyn & Gérard Espinasse (2)	TV movie
1995–98	La croisière Foll'amour	Hilguegue	Olivier Altman, Gérard Espinasse (3), ...	TV series (159 episodes)
1997	Les vacances de l'amour	Ingrid	Gérard Espinasse (4)	TV series (1 episode)
1999	C'est pas ma faute !	The Dutch woman	Jacques Monnet	
1999	Maître Da Costa	Julie Nahon	Nicolas Ribowski	TV series (1 episode)
2000	Chacun chez soi	Inge	Élisabeth Rappeneau	TV movie
2000	Toute la ville en parle	Evelyne	Marc Rivière	TV movie
2000	Les Misérables	Fantine's friend	Josée Dayan	TV mini-series
2000	Le G.R.E.C.	Diane	Fred Béraud-Dufour	TV series (1 episode)
2001	De toute urgence	Lise Keller	Philippe Triboit	TV movie
2001	Ma vie en l'air		Arnaud Sélignac	TV movie
2001	Largo Winch	Anna Faubert	Daniel Grou	TV series (1 episode)
2001	Méditerranée	DASS Director	Henri Helman	TV series (1 episode)
2002	Patron sur mesure	Clara	Stéphane Clavier	TV movie
2002	Le miroir d'Alice	The magician	Marc Rivière (2)	TV movie
2002	Sentiments partagés	Carole	Daniel Janneau	TV movie
2002	L'été rouge	Linda Porter	Gérard Marx	TV mini-series
2002	Josephine, Guardian Angel	Ingrid	David Delrieux	TV series (1 episode)
2002	Sous le soleil	Sylviane	Sylvie Ayme	TV series (1 episode)
2002	Navarro	Delphine	Gilles Béhat	TV series (1 episode)
2003	Valentine	Jessica	Eric Summer	TV movie
2003	Nestor Burma	Olga	Maurice Frydland	TV series (1 episode)
2003	Père et maire	Natacha	Philippe Monnier	TV series (1 episode)
2004	Menteur ! Menteuse !	Sacha	Henri Helman (2)	TV movie
2004	Le fond de l'air est frais	Sylvie	Laurent Carcélès	TV movie
2004–06	Le proc	Sandra Nielsen	Didier Albert, Claudio Tonetti, ...	TV series (6 episodes)
2005	Désiré Landru	Odile	Pierre Boutron	TV movie
2005	Vous êtes libre ?	Laure	Pierre Joassin	TV movie
2005	Commissaire Moulin	Fidèle	Eric Summer (2)	TV series (1 episode)
2005	Navarro	Diane de Pasquelier	Jean Sagols	TV series (1 episode)
2005	Fabien Cosma	Sofia Vrina	Marion Sarraut	TV series (1 episode)
2005	Avocats & associés	Me Jenny Blake	Patrice Martineau	TV series (1 episode)
2006	Chassé-croisé amoureux	Luisa	Gérard Cuq	TV movie
2006	Camping paradis	Laura	Didier Albert (2)	TV series (1 episode)
2007	Nous nous sommes tant haïs	Katharina	Franck Apprederis	TV movie
2007	Valentine & Cie	Jessica	Patrice Martineau (2)	TV movie
2007	Lost Signs	Erika de Lestrade	Didier Albert (3)	TV mini-series
2009	La taupe 2	Justine	Vincenzo Marano	TV movie
2009	Adresse inconnue	Christine Devillard	Alain Wermus	TV series (1 episode)
2010	Diane, femme flic	Carole Jalabert	Jean-Michel Fages	TV series (1 episode)
2013–14	Borgia	Giovanna Farnese	Metin Hüseyin, Dearbhla Walsh, ...	TV series (14 episodes)
