= IDF1 =

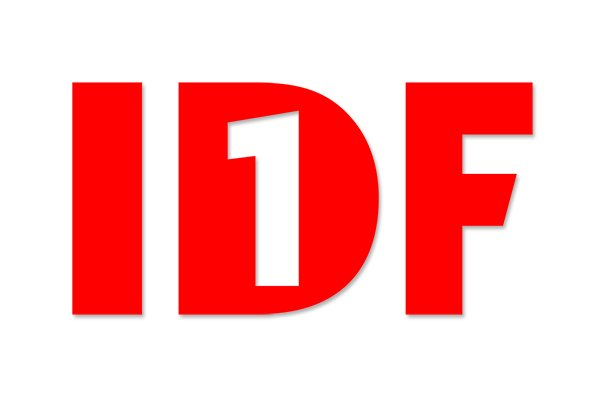
- Country: France
- Broadcast area: Île-de-France

Ownership
- Owner: Groupe JLA

History
- Launched: 20 March 2008
- Founder: Jean-Luc Azoulay
- Closed: 26 May 2023
- Replaced by: 20 Minutes TV Île-de-France

Links
- Website: www.idf1.fr

Availability

Terrestrial
- TNT (Île-de-France): Channel 32

IDF1 was a French family oriented, local television channel. Broadcasting on the TNT service to the Île-de-France region from the Eiffel Tower. It is owned by Groupe JLA.

== History ==
After the rejection of "DO-TV" and "CLUB-RECRE" on the TNT service, IDF1 was finally selected by the Conseil supérieur de l'audiovisuel (CSA) on 5 June 2007, to broadcast on channel 22 on the TNT service in Île-de-France.

On the evening of 20 March 2008, IDF1 was launched. It was closed on 26 May 2023.

== Broadcasting ==
20 March 2008 to 26 May 2023, IDF1 Was broadcast on channel 22 of the TNT service in Île-de-France from the Eiffel Tower, and is also present on Numericable (Channel 17) and soon on ADSL networks. It will therefore cover a population area of nearly 12 million people, or an area equivalent to three times the size of the French Community of Belgium.

== TV shows airing on IDF1 ==
- Vivement lundi
- London's Burning
- Marc et Sophie
- Flipper
- Le groupe
- Baie des flamboyants
- T. and T.
- Skippy the Bush Kangaroo
- Fame
- Island détectives
- Les vacances de l'amour
- Fame L.A.
- Tropical Heat
- Le G.R.E.C.
- Saved by the Bell
- Marina
- Parker Lewis Can't Lose
- Le miracle de l'amour
- Da Cor Do Pecado
- SOS 18
- 21 Jump Street
- Dieu
- Pat et les filles
- Le tuteur
- Laços de Familia
- Paginas da Vida
- Pas de pitié pour les croissants
- Salut les Musclés
- La croisière foll'amour
