= Commissaire Moulin =

- Also known as: Commissaire Moulin, police judiciaire
- Created by: Paul Andréota and Claude Boissol
- Starring: Yves Rénier
- Country of origin: France
- No. of episodes: 70

Production
- Running time: 90 minutes

Original release
- Network: TF1
- Release: 4 August 1976 – 5 June 2008

Commissaire Moulin (English: Police Commissioner Moulin) is a French television series created by Paul Andréota and Claude Boissol and starring Yves Rénier as the title character, Commissaire Jean-Paul Moulin. The show started in 1976 and was canceled in 1982. It resumed in 1989 and had seasons into 2008. The entire series spans seventy 90-minute episodes.

== Plot ==
The series follows the adventures of lighthearted Police Commissaire Jean-Paul Moulin and his team as they solve crimes.

== Actors ==
- Yves Rénier : Commissaire Jean-Paul Moulin
- Clément Michu : Inspector Galland
- Guy Montagné : Guyomard
- Jean-Pierre Kérien : Rocard
- Jean-Luc Moreau : Alex
- Diane Simenon : Poupette
- Laurence Charpentier : Lolo
- Natacha Amal : Samantha Beaumont
- Annie Balestra : Baba
- Tchee : Le Chinois
- Francis Lax : Director
- Régis Anders : Deputy Director
- Samantha Rénier : Marie Moulin
- Bernard Rosselli : Commander Léon Guermer
- Alice Béat : Lieutenant Charlotte Marszewski
- Anne-Charlotte Pontabry : Doctor Sophie Moulin
- Daniel Russo : Shalom

=== Other actors appearing in the series ===
- Jean-Claude Dauphin (Bernard Deffoux, Ricochets, 1976)
- Sophie Barjac (Joëlle, Ricochets, 1976)
- Pierre Vernier (Jacques Frémont, La peur des autres, 1976)
- Paul Crauchet (Cassius, Choc en retour, 1976)
- Marie-Christine Adam (Orlane, Choc en retour, 1976)
- Tsilla Chelton (Tante Moulin, Petite hantise, 1977)
- Bernard Alane (Judge, Marée basse, 1977)
- Henri-Jacques Huet (Coral, Marée basse, 1977)
- Michel Auclair (Commissaire Kirs, Affectation spéciale, 1977)
- Véronique Jannot (Corinne, Intox, 1978)
- Jean Benguigui (Max, Intox, 1979)
- Olga Georges-Picot (Cécile, Fausse note, 1978)
- Michèle Baumgartner (Rom, Les brebis egarées, 1979)
- Jean-Pierre Castaldi (José, Les brebis egarées, 1979)
- Lorraine Bracco (Jenny, Le transfuge, 1980)
- Claude Jade (Isabelle Mencier, L'amie d'enfance, 1981)
- Philippe Nahon (Pillette, L'amie d'enfance, 1981)
- Dorothée Jemma (Gigite, L'amie d'enfance, 1981, Françoise Brunetti, "Le récidiviste", 1994)
- Vincent Grass (Inspector Gervoise, L'amie d'enfance, 1981)
- Hans Meyer (Assassin, L'amie d'enfance, 1981)
- Raymond Pellegrin (Neubauer, La bavure, 1981)
- Paul Le Person (Pierre Chartier, Le Patron, 1982)
- Philippe Laudenbach (Valeri, Le Patron, 1982)
- Béatrice Agenin (Camille Chartier, Le Patron, 1982)
- Élisabeth Wiener (Anne Loven, Une promenade en fôret, 1982)
- Dominique Paturel (Toscane, Une promenade en fôret, 1982)
- Nelly Benedetti (Sylvie Callot, Une promenade en fôret, 1982)
- Gilles Segal (Jean Caradec, Un hanneton sur le dos, 1982)
- Robert Etcheverry (Manuel Coeixera, Courvée de bois, 1989)
- Bruno Pradal (Bertrand, Match nul, 1990)
- Charles Gérard (Mario, Bras d'honneur, 1990)
- Dani (la mère de Momo, Non-assistance à personne en danger, 1992)
- Jean-Pierre Bisson (le beau-père de Momo, Non-assistance à personne en danger, 1992)
- François Levantal (Franck, Les zombies, 1992)
- Jean-Pierre Malo (Mirko, Le Simulateur, 1992)
- Jacques Dacqmine (Cattoire, L... comme Lennon, 1992)
- Franck de la Personne (Gilles Lecourbe, Syndrome de menace, 1993)
- Philippe Leroy (Fabian, Syndrome de ménace, 1993)
- Viktor Lazlo (Marie, Mort d'un officier de police, 1994)
- Olivier Marchal (le chat, Mort d'un officier de police, 1994, Vava, "Serial Killer", 1999)
- Jean-Pierre Kalfon (Le récidiviste, 1994)
- Tristan Calvez (Laurent Leguen, Illégitime défense, 1995)
- Nicolas Marié (Maitre Boileau, Illégitime défense, 1995)
- Michel Creton (Louis, Silence radio, 1998)
- Nadège Beausson-Diagne (Serial killer, 1999)
- Mike Marshall (Machard, Une protection très rapprochée, 2000)
- Jean-Marie Winling (Simon-Grangier, "Mortelle séduction", 2000, Un coupable trop parfait, 2005)
- François Dunoyer (Staub, Au nom des enfants, 2001)
- Roger Dumas (Ferrandini, Un flic sous influence, 2001)
- Étienne Chicot (Guy Giuliani Série noire, 2003)
- Mhamed Arezki (Mouss, Sale bizness, 2003)
- Rebecca Hampton (2003-2004)
- Anthony Delon (Hugo Arragio, Bandit d'honneur, 2004)
- Frank Geney (Frédéric Menguy, Les lois de Murphy, 2004)
- Christopher Buchholz (Gérard Brovinsky, Un coupable trop parfait, 2005)
- Patrick Fierry (Maurice Guibert, Le sniper, 2005)
- Cécile Pallas (Catherine Garnier, Le sniper, 2005)
- Jean-Yves Berteloot (Pierre Sébastien, Sous pression, 2005)
- Johnny Hallyday (William Torrano, Kidnapping, 2005)
- Xavier Deluc (Veraghen, "Kidnapping", 2005)
- Jean-François Stévenin (Jacques Mirvin, "Kidnapping", 2005)
- Babsie Steger (Fidèle, La pente raide, 2005)
- Christian Vadim (Paul Guersant, Le profil de tueur, 2006)
- Paul Barge (Me Boistard, La promesse, 2006)
- Mathieu Carrière (Michel Léobard, La dernière affaire, 2006)
- Fanny Sidney (Véronique Léonard, La dernière affaire, 2006)
- Olivier Saladin (Peruz, La fille du chef, 2007)

== Directors ==
Guy Lefranc & Gérard Marx direct 1 Episode.

== See also ==
- List of French television series
