= Hélène et les Garçons =

- Genre: Sitcom
- Created by: Jean-François Porry
- Starring: Hélène Rollès; Patrick Puydebat; Phillipe Vasseur; Sebastien Courivaud; Rochelle Redfield; Sébastien Roch; Cathy Andrieu; David Proux; Fabrice Josso
- Country of origin: France
- No. of episodes: 280

Production
- Producer: TF1
- Camera setup: Multi camera
- Running time: 26 minutes

Original release
- Network: TF1
- Release: 11 May 1992 – 22 November 1994

Hélène et les Garçons (Helen and the Boys) is a French romantic television sitcom that aired from 1992 to 1994 on TF1. The original series featured a group of 20-year-old actors with no experience and became an instant hit. The series is now considered an international cult classic.

The series was followed by The Miracle of Love (1995–1996) and Les vacances de l'amour (1996–2007), which had loyal viewers but were less popular than the original series. In 2011, the series Les Mystères de l'amour revisited characters from the original series 19 years after its debut.

== Background ==
It was created in 1992 by Jean-Luc Azoulay. Hélène, the main character, is performed by the actress Hélène Rollès who is also a famous singer in France.

It is a spin-off from the series First Kisses, and follows Hélène Girard and her friends in their life as students.

== Synopsis ==
Hélène shares her college room with Cathy and Johanna. One day, the three friends meet three young men, who share a college room and play in a rock band together. Hélène and her friends will be in love.

== Detailed plot ==
In the first episode three young girl students meet three boy musicians. The series deals with love, friendship, betrayal, sadness, joy. Over the episodes, the actors and their roles grow. In 1994, the series The Miracle of Love (Le miracle de l'amour) takes over. The merry band leaves the hospice room and rents a large house together.

The departure of the central actors Hélène Rollès (Helen) and Patrick Puydebat (Nicolas) caused a loss of audience. A replacement was then proposed for Helen and the Boys. So Les vacances de l'amour (The holidays of love) began in 1996 and lasted until 2004, with 160 episodes aired. The format of the series goes to 52 minutes and left the studios of the plain of St. Denis and cardboard sets. Natural scenery and rich in the fictitious island of Love Island in the Caribbean. The band goes on vacation for three weeks and will find Nicolas who was exiled there. Eventually they will all move there. Helen will also be returning. But also detective stories and endless surprises.

In 2010, Helen and her boys were back in the new series Mysteries of Love (Les Mystères de l'amour).
