= Sébastien Roch (singer) =

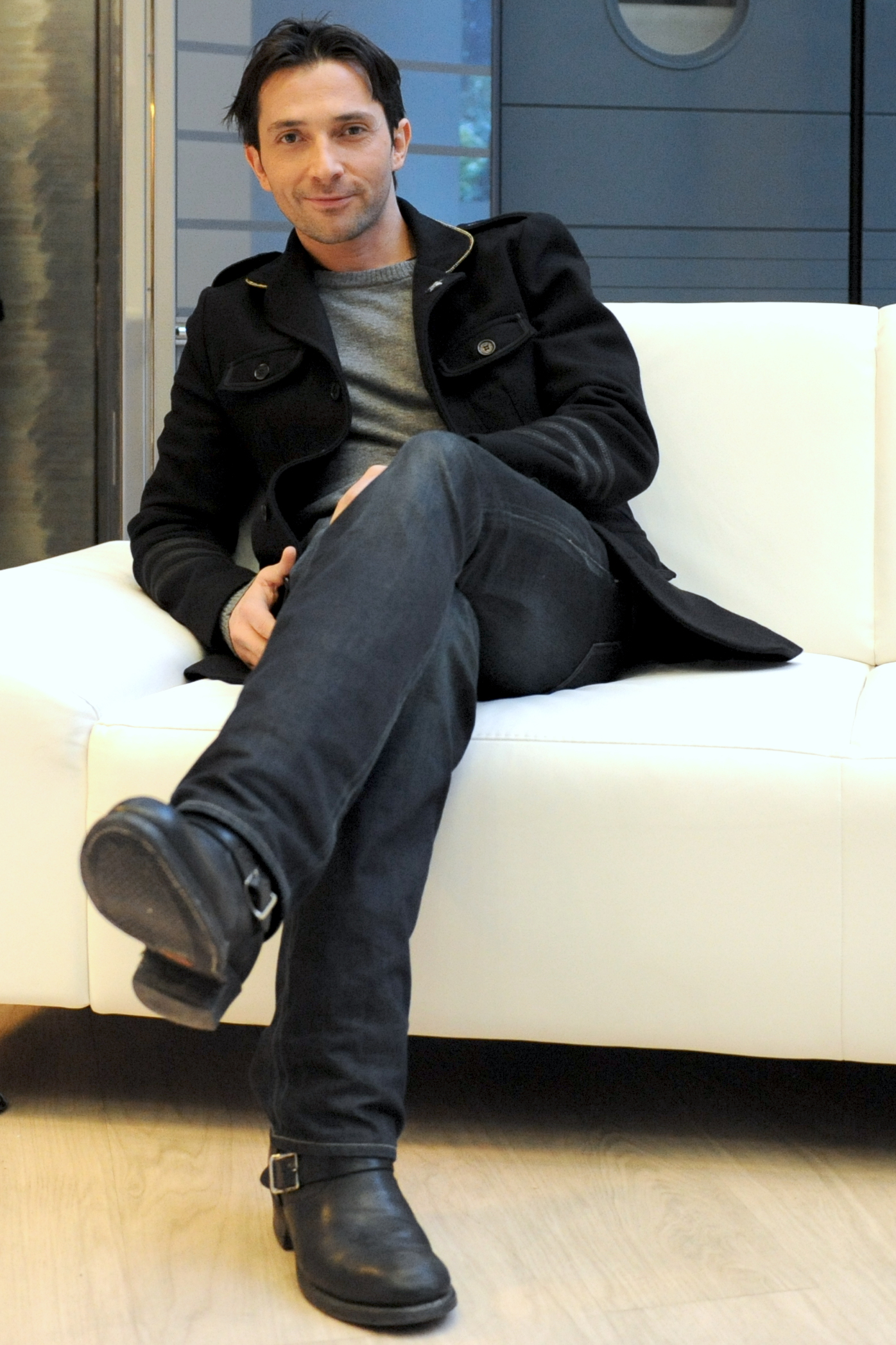

Background information
- Born: 3 December 1972 (age 53)
- Origin: Toulouse, France
- Genres: Pop
- Occupations: Singer, actor, television host
- Years active: 1992–present

Sébastien Roch (born 3 December 1972) is a French actor, singer and television host. He achieved notability with his role of Christian in the TV series Hélène et les Garçons and Les Vacances de l'amour. He had also a success with his 1993 single, "Au Bar de Jess", which peaked at number 17 in France.

== Filmography ==
=== Cinema ===
- 1992 : Les Paroles invisibles
- 1997 : La Fin de la nuit
- 2000 : In extremis
- 2003 : Le Principe du canapé
- 2004 : Prisonnier
- 2005 : Ze Film
- 2005 : Rue des Vertus

== Television ==
- 1991 : Cas de divorce (TV series) – as Mr. Laurier
- 1992–1994 : Hélène et les Garçons (TV series) – as Christian
- 1995 : Fils de flic
- 2004 : Les Vacances de l'amour (TV series) – Christian
- 2006 : Sous le soleil (TV series) – as Tony
- 2007 : King Size – as Pierre
- 2007 : Baie des flamboyants saison 1 (TV series)
- 2008 : SOS 18 (TV series)
- 2008 : Disparitions (TV series)
- 2009 : Comprendre et pardonner (TV series)
- 2010 : Les Mystères de l'amour (TV series)

== Discography ==
=== Albums ===
- 1993 : Silences
- 2007 : Puce de luxe

=== Singles ===
- 1993 : "Le Bar de Jess" – #17 in France
- 1993 : "Pousse petit vent"
- 2007 : "Mes sandales"

== Presenter ==
- Since 6 April 2009 : IDF1 Matin, with Laly Meignan
