= Hélène Rollès =

French actress and singer

- Born: 20 December 1966 (age 58); Le Mans, France
- Genres: Pop
- Occupation(s): Singer, Actress
- Instrument(s): Vocals, guitar
- Years active: 1979–2005; 2010–present

Hélène Rollès (French pronunciation: [elɛn ʁɔlɛs]; at times just the mononym Hélène; born 20 December 1966) is a French actress and singer, primarily known for her major role in the TV sitcom Hélène et les Garçons (Helen and the Boys), alongside Sébastien Roch.

== Life and career ==
In the 1990s, she played Hélène Girard, Justine's old sister, in the sitcom Premiers Baisers. Due to the interest around the role character, Jean-Luc Azoulay decided to create a sitcom based on her character in 1992 and named it Hélène et les Garçons.

Hélène et les Garçons became an instant television success. The show, which recounts love stories of a student band at the university, garnered up to 6,500,000 viewers every night.

The show has been adapted for foreign countries like the US, Norway, Spain, Denmark, Greece, Sweden and Russia.

Rollès made her musical debut with Pour l'amour d'un garçon and Peut être qu'en septembre.

Her career peaked in 1993, when she published her most popular album, Je m'appelle Hélène, which sold 900,000 and went triple platinum. In February 1993, Rollès was nominated for a Victoires de la Musique. The same year, the book Je m'appelle Hélène was published by editions Montjoie.

The director Morgan Delaunay has published a documentary on the net titled Hélène Rolles, une étoile pas comme les autres.

She participated in a spin-off series of la Ferme Célébrités and Première Compagnie (reality show).

In February 2013, Rollès adopted two children, a brother and a sister, from Ethiopia.

== Filmography ==
Date	Titles
1979	The Black Sheep (Le Mouton noir)
1991	First Kisses (Premiers baisers) (TV)
1992	Helen and the Guys (Hélène et les garçons) (TV)
1994	The Miracle of Love (Le Miracle de l'amour) (TV)
2000	Exit (film)
2000	Holidays of Love (Les vacances de l'amour) (TV)
2011	Mysteries of Love (Les mystères de l'amour) (TV)

== Discography ==
=== Albums ===
Year	Album	Alternative title	Peak positions	
Year	Album	Alternative title	FRA	BEL (Wa)
1989	Hélène	Ce train qui s'en va	—	—
1992	Hélène 1992	Pour l'amour d'un garçon	7	—
1993	Hélène 1993	Je m'appelle Hélène	—	—
1994	Hélène 1994	Le miracle de l'amour	—	—
1995	Toi... émois		—	—
1997	Hélène 1997	À force de solitude	39	—
2003	Tourner la page		—	—
2012	Hélène 2012		127	—
2016	Hélène 2016		5	109
2021	Hélène 2021		18	20

=== Compilation albums ===
Year	Album	Peak positions		Details
Year	Album	FRA	BEL (Wa)	Details
2012	Hélène Compilation	—	—	
2016	L'Essentiel	69	196	Triple CD compilation + rare tracks

=== Live albums ===
Year	Album	Peak positions
Year	Album	FRA
2017	Hélène à l'Olympia 2016	80

=== Singles ===
- 1988: Dans ses grands yeux verts
- 1989: Ce train qui s'en va
- 1989: Sarah
- 1990: Jimmy, Jimmy
- 1990: Makko (Générique du dessin animé)
- 1992: Pour l'amour d'un garçon (#4 in France)
- 1993: Peut être qu'en septembre (#11 in France)
- 1993: Dona, Dona (duo Dorothée)
- 1993: Je m'appelle Hélène (#5 in France)
- 1994: Dans les yeux d'une fille
- 1994: Amour secret
- 1994: Le Miracle de l'amour
- 1995: Moi aussi je vous aime
- 1995: Imagine
- 1995: Toi
- 1996: Je t'aime
- 1997: À force de solitude
- 1998: C'est parce que je t'aime
- 2003: Que du vent
- 2003: Sur mon étoile
- 2010: Salut, ça va? (duo Dorothée)
- 2011: Les Mystères de l'amour
- 2012: C'était à toi que je pensais
- 2012: Robin des bois
- 2016: Effacer le passé
- 2016: Nos tendres années
- 2017: Di dou dam
- 2021: Un amour

== Videography ==
- Hélène 1992
- Hélène 1993
- Zénith 1993
- Hélène 1994
- Hélène 1995
- Bercy 1995
