= Les vacances de l'amour =

- Genre: Comedy; Drama
- Created by: Jean-François Porry
- Starring: Hélène Rollès; Patrick Puydebat; Laure Guibert; Tom Schacht; Philippe Vasseur; Laly Meignan; Rochelle Redfield; Ludovic Van Dorm; Isabelle Bouysse; Mike Marshall
- Country of origin: France
- Original language: French
- No. of seasons: 5
- No. of episodes: 160

Production
- Running time: 45 minutes
- Production companies: AB Productions; JLA Productions

Original release
- Network: TF1
- Release: 4 August 1996 – 23 March 2007

Les vacances de l'amour (lit. The holidays of love) is a French TV series, the continuation of the series Le miracle de l'amour (lit. The miracle of love) which is the continuation of the successful series Hélène et les garçons (lit. Hélène and the Boys). The main character is played by Hélène Rollès, a famous actress and singer in France. Les vacances de l'amour started in 1996 and finished in 2007.

== Cast ==
=== Main characters ===
- Laly Meignan as Laly Pollei
- Lynda Lacoste as Linda Carlick
- Manuela Lopez as Manuela Roquier
- Laure Guibert as Bénédicte Breton
- Philippe Vasseur as José Da Silva
- Olivier Casadesus as Olivier Legendre
- Karine Lollichon as Nathalie
- Annette Schreiber as Cynthia Stegger
- Tom Schacht as Jimmy Werner
- Patrick Puydebat as Nicolas Vernier
- Rochelle Redfield as Johanna McCormick
- Isabelle Bouysse as Jeanne Garnier
- Mike Marshall as Captain Oliver
- Hélène Rollès as Hélène Girard

=== Secondary characters ===
- Ludovic Van Dorm as Stéphane Charvet
- Sébastien Roch as Christian Roquier
- Lucie Jeanne as Gaëlle Mulligan

=== Guest ===
- Babsie Steger as Ingrid
- Delphine Chanéac as Daphné/Sophie
