= Jean-Luc Azoulay =

French television producer

Jean-Luc Azoulay also known by the pseudonym Jean-François Porry (born 1947 in Sétif, then French Algeria) is a French television producer. He was born in Algeria to a Sephardic Jewish family.

In 1987, with the Club Dorothée, he developed a new concept for a youth TV show which had great success beginning in the 1980s until 1997, on TF1, one of the most important French TV channels. In 1997 TF1 somewhat mysteriously cancelled all its contracts with Azoulay production company' "AB", even though AB content was, by far, the most popular on French TV at the time.

In the 1990s he created an astonishing number of extremely successful so-called "sitcoms", including "Salut les Musclés", "Premiers Baisers", "Hélène et les Garcons", "Le Miel et les Abelles", "Le Philo selon Philippe", "Les Filles d'a coté". In addition to these he created many others which had lesser success, such as "Le College des Coeurs Brisés", "Un homme a Domicile", "Talk Show", L'un Contre L'autre", "Les Garcons de la Plage" or "Else, un roman photo". "Premieres Baisers" and its spin-off, "Hélène et les Garcons", each of about 200 episodes, both had several sequels. "Hélène et les Garcons" in particular was followed by "Le Miracle de l'Amour" and then "Les Vacances de l'Amour" (produced on location in the carabian) and Azoulay has recently revived the series, with the same actors, now 20 years older, in "Les Mysteres de l'Amour", which has so far seen three seasons.

Azoulay's "sit-coms" are based on both American sitcoms and soap opera, though in fact they are a genre in their own right, which adds elements from French theatrical farce and the old traditional 'roman'. The AB production method called for shooting 4 episodes per week; of the many hundreds of episodes produced during the period from the launch of "Salut les Musclés" in the late 1980s until the 1997 close-down, Azoulay is either author or co-author of most of them.

Jean-Luc Azoulay is the songwriter for Dorothée and Hélène, also producing all of their shows at the largest venues in France as well as major sites in Asia.

In October 2004, he produced 12 shows at the Palais des congrès de Paris for the legendary French singer Sylvie Vartan.

In 2000, he produced the successful TV series Navarro, L'Instit, Quai n°1, along with other prestigious TV series like Les Liaisons Dangereuses and Les Rois maudits, establishing him as one of the top primetime TV producers.

In October 2007, he adapted Baie des Flamboyants from the Mexican telenovela Codigo Postal.
