= André Gillois =

French writer

Maurice Diamant-Berger (8 February 1902 – 18 June 2004), known as André Gillois, was a French writer, radio pioneer and - during the Second World War - general Charles de Gaulle's spokesman in London.

== Life ==
Before the war he worked for the cinema (with René Clair and his brother Henri), as a radio journalist and producer on Le Poste Parisien (with Jean Nohain, meeting Georges Feydeau, Edmond Rostand, Henri Bergson, Georges Courteline, Tristan Bernard or Sacha Guitry), and as an editor with François Bernouard (editing Jules Renard, Courteline, Zola). In 1940, he left Paris and spent two years in the Midi, establishing the first Résistance networks and links with the British. On 31 August 1942, he left from Cannes for Gibraltar at night on the sail-boat Seadog, then went by plane to London, with Nicholas Bodington.

From 17 May 1943 to 24 September 1944, he was the daily presenter of Honneur et patrie, the programme for the French resistance, creating le Chant des partisans and announcing every day "Ici Londres, les Français parlent aux Français" ("This is London, the French talk to the French"). On 1 June 1944, he replaced Maurice Schumann as general de Gaulle's spokesman.

After the war, he dedicated himself to writing plays and novels, as well as television and radio scripts. In the 1950s he, Emmanuel Berl and Maurice Clavel presented the radio series Qui êtes-vous ?. In 1954, Gillois created one of the first French TV gameshows, Télé Match, with Jacques Antoine and Pierre Bellemare, and in 1958 a jury (including Georges Simenon) awarded him the prix du Quai des Orfèvres for his crime novel 125, rue Montmartre.

In 1973, André-Gillois he published La Vie secrète des Français à Londres de 1940 à 1944, and in 1980 his memoirs were published as Ce siècle avait deux ans. He died in Paris in 2004 and is buried at Passy cemetery.

== Family ==
He was the son of Dr Mayer Saül Diamant-Berger and Jenny Birman, and his brother was Henri Diamant-Berger. He married Suzon.

== Works ==
- c.1945. De la Résistance à l'Insurrection, preface by Emmanuel d'Astier de la Vigerie, Éditions Sève, s.d.
- 1947. La Corde raide, Nouvelles Éditions Latines.
- 1950. La Souricière, Les Éditions de Minuit.
- 1953. Les grandes Familles de France, André Bonne.
- 1953. Qui êtes-vous ?, texte des émissions de radio (1949–1951), Gallimard.
- 1954–55. L'Art d'aimer à travers les âges, 3 vol., André Vial.
- 1957. Polydora, pièce en 3 actes, L'Avant-Scène, fémina-théâtre, n° 150.
- 1958. 125, Rue Montmartre, coll. Le Point d'interrogation, Hachette.
- 1959. Le petit Tailleur de Londres, roman, Julliard.
- 1959. Le Dessous des Cartes, pièce en 4 actes, L'Avant-Scène, fémina-théâtre, n° 194.
- 1963. La Corde pour le pendre, coll. Le Point d'interrogation, Hachette.
- 1966. La France qui rit... La France qui grogne, Hachette.
- 1967. Filous et Gogos, Hachette.
- 1968. Les petites Comédies, Julliard.
- 1970. Information contre X, Julliard.
- 1973. La Vie secrète des Français à Londres de 1940 à 1944, Hachette Littérature.
- 1980. Ce siècle avait deux ans. Mémoires, préface de Jean-Louis Crémieux-Brilhac, Belfond; rééd. Mémoire du Livre, 2002.
- 1981. Voyage surprise. Les folles vacances de 20 Français, with Jean Nohain, Alain Lefeuvre.
- 1982. Un Roman d'amour, récit, Pierre Belfond.
- 1985. Gallifet, le fusilleur de la Commune, France Empire.
- 1986. Boulevard du Temps qui passe; de Jules Renard à de Gaulle, Le Pré aux Clercs.
- 1986. Le Secret de la Tsarine, Payot.
- 1990. Le Mensonge historique, Robert Laffont.
- 1992. La Mort pour de rire, Le Cherche Midi.
- 1995. L'Homme éberlué, chronique du XXe siècle (1940–1975), Les Éditions de Paris.
- 1997. Le Penseur du dimanche, Éditions de Paris.
- 2000. Adieu mon siècle, Ornican.

== Selected filmography ==
- My Aunt from Honfleur (1931)
- Narcisse (1940)
- 125 Rue Montmartre (1959)
