= A la caza del tesoro =

Spanish game show

- Genre: Game show
- Based on: La Chasse aux trésors
- Presented by: Isabel Tenaille; Miguel de la Quadra-Salcedo
- Opening theme: "Fu Man Chu" by Azul y Negro
- Country of origin: Spain
- Original language: Spanish
- No. of series: 1
- No. of episodes: 18

Production
- Running time: 50 min.
- Production companies: Televisión Española; Télé-Union

Original release
- Network: TVE-1
- Release: 8 January – 13 May 1984

A la caza del tesoro is the Spanish version of the French game show La Chasse aux trésors. It was produced by Televisión Española (TVE) and Télé-Union, and was broadcast on TVE-1 between 8 January and 13 May 1984. It was presented by Isabel Tenaille in the studio, with Miguel de la Quadra-Salcedo searching for the treasures abroad.

The show was one of the international adaptations of the format, which was also adapted in the United Kingdom as Treasure Hunt; and Germany, Italy, the Netherlands, Portugal, and Scandinavia.

== Premise ==
Presenter Isabel Tenaille greets a pair of contestants, a man and a woman, at the show's studio. They are then given a mission: to find three treasures in under 45 minutes in a remote location without leaving the studio. Using the clues they receive and the maps, travel guides, and books available to them, they must give instructions to Miguel de la Quadra-Salcedo, who will travel by helicopter to locate the treasures in the remote area. Once they find one of the treasures, they receive the clue for the following one. For each treasure found, they win 100,000 pesetas (€601), and if they find all three, they win an all-expenses-paid trip around the world.

== Production ==
A la caza del tesoro is the Spanish version of the French game show La Chasse aux trésors, which was created by Jacques Antoine and produced by Télé-Union. Televisión Española (TVE) produced the Spanish version with the collaboration of Télé-Union. The show used the same technical equipment as the French version and the same studio in Paris. Communication with the remote location was carried out with a radio-telephone link via satellite in audio only, since there was no live television connection. The footage filmed in the remote location was added in post-production. The opening theme was "Fu Man Chú" by synthpop music duo Azul y Negro.

The eighteen episodes of the single season were broadcast on TVE-1 between 8 January and 13 May 1984.

== Episodes ==
A la caza del tesoro
Ep.	Remote location	Original release date	Contestants	Treasures found
1	Central Province, Sri Lanka	8 January 1984	Ana and Jerónimo	Two
2	Brittany, France	15 January 1984	Alejandro and Carmen	Two
3	Sydney, Australia	22 January 1984	Asunción and Juan Ignacio	Three
4	Bosnia, Yugoslavia	29 January 1984	Fernando and María Jesús	Two
5	North Gyeongsang, South Korea	5 February 1984	Carmen and Enrique	Three
6	Hong Kong	12 February 1984	Antonio and Maribel	Two
7	Kangaroo Island, Australia	19 February 1984	Juan Luis and Laura	Two
8	Fez-Meknes, Morocco	26 February 1984	Antonio and Elena	Three
9	Sicily, Italy	4 March 1984	Ana and Pedro	Two
10	Cartagena, Colombia	11 March 1984	Antonio and María Antonieta	Two
11	Granada, Spain	18 March 1984	Ángeles and Juan Ignacio	Three
12	Las Vegas, United States	25 March 1984	Juan Francisco and Marina	Two
13	Habana, Cuba	1 April 1984	Ángel and Celsa	Two
14	Moyen-Ogooué, Gabon	8 April 1984	José and María Jesús	Two
15	Cádiz, Spain	15 April 1984	Antonio and Marisa	Three
16	Malta	22 April 1984	Carlos and Silvia	Two
17	Kongo Central, Zaire	6 May 1984	Montserrat and Óscar	Three
18	Hautes-Pyrénées, France	13 May 1984	Bartolomé and Remedios	Two
