= Télé Match =

- Created by: Jacques Antoine
- Presented by: Pierre Bellemare
- Country of origin: France

Original release
- Network: RTF
- Release: 25 October 1954 – June 8, 1961

Télé Match was one of the first game shows on French television. It was created in 1954 by André Gillois, Pierre Bellemare and Jacques Antoine, broadcast on TF1, at that time the sole television channel of RTF, and presented by Pierre Bellemare.
