= Claire King (author) =

English author (born 1972)

Claire King (born Claire Nortcliff on 5 January 1972 in Mexborough, West Riding of Yorkshire) is an English author, best known for her novel The Night Rainbow.

== Biography ==
King went to school at Mexborough School, Mexborough, and studied at Newnham College, University of Cambridge, graduating in economics. In 1990 she appeared on The Crystal Maze.

== The Night Rainbow ==
King's debut novel was released on 14 February 2013 by Bloomsbury UK (ISBN 978-1408824672). The book was first published in the United Kingdom through Bloomsbury Publishing and narrates the story of two sisters living in a small village in Southern France.

Kirkus Reviews and Library Journal both reviewed the work, with Kirkus giving it a mixed review stating it was "hampered by a limited perspective, though well-written and sometimes quite moving".

== Everything Love Is ==
King's second novel was released on 28 July 2016 by Bloomsbury UK (ISBN 978-1408868423). The book was first published in the United Kingdom through Bloomsbury Publishing and narrates the story of Baptiste Molino, a therapist attempting to resolve the mystery of the identity of his birth mother. Shelf Awareness called it a "haunting, rewarding memory novel".

== Personal life ==
King lived for 15 years in Languedoc-Roussillon, France, the setting for The Night Rainbow. She now lives in Gloucestershire with her husband and children. King's third novel is underway; set in Yorkshire, it will examine issues of love and social class.
