= List of The Crystal Maze games =

This is a list of games in the 2017 version of British game show The Crystal Maze, sorted by zone.

The coloured backgrounds denote the type of game:

- Mental
- Mystery
- Physical
- Skill

ALIS - Automatic Lock-in Situation

== Aztec Zone ==
| Name of game | Explanation | Time | ALIS |
|---|---|---|---|
| Balancing scales | Use a raft to retrieve sandbags and balance a set of scales to release the crystal | 3:00 | None |
| Word wheel | Turn concentric wheels to make twelve 8 letter words | 2:00 | None |
| Water pipes | Make three pipes to divert water into containers. As the containers fill with water, the contestant can grab keys to release the crystal | 3:00 | None |
| Dragon totem pole | Stack four blocks of a totem pole in the correct order to release the crystal | 3:00 | None |
| Raise the balls | Use ropes to raise a tray of balls and direct them into a pipe to release the crystal | 3:00 | By allowing three balls to fall onto the floor |
| Log balance | Carry parts of a temple across a log to release the crystal | 3:00 | None |
| Sliding planks | Slide planks to create a walkway to reach the crystal | 2:30 | By touching the floor covered in fog or jumping across sections without using the sliding planks |
| Memory blocks | Navigate a water obstacle course whilst remembering the order of blocks with symbols | 3:00 | None |
| Face symbols | Arrange blocks so each face shows all four symbols | 3:00 | None |
| Symbol wheels | Spin wheels so all the adjacent symbols match | 2:00 | None |
| Water transport | Carry water across a balance beam, avoiding swinging rocks | 3:00 | None |
| Water symbols | Move symbols into the correct section to release the crystal | 3:00 | None |
| Skull swing | Swing a skull to knock down five gold skulls | 2:30 | By knocking off three black skulls |
| Tile words | Spin tiles to create five words, then rearrange the last letter of each word to release the crystal | 3:00 | None |
| Vine swing | Clamber through hanging vines to reach the crystal | 2:00 | By touching the floor covered in fog |
| Unique symbols | Find three unique symbols from a wall of 100 symbols | 2:30 | None |
| Fossil assemble | Assemble a spiral fossil then guide the crystal round it | 3:00 | None |
| Triple symbol match | Turn both wheels to find the matching three symbols on different sides of a rope ladder | 3:00 | None |
| Consonant crossword | Complete the words by placing the consonants into the crossword | 2:30 | None |
| Ball roll | Roll three balls over a zigzag platform into a net. | 3:00 | None |
| Water symbols | Walk along a flat chord over water with a few ropes for support, put the four magnetic puzzle pieces hanging from the ceiling into the right place | 3:00 | None |
| Underwater labyrinth | Navigate the chained crystal through a labyrinth which goes under water and across the walls | 2:00 | None |
| Red sand | Throw bean bags at the targets which will release red sand into the hourglass which already contains sand but is losing sand, to release the crystal the red sand must be up to the white line | 2:00 | None |
| Lasso swing | Throw a lasso at a hook and use this to swing across to the crystal | 2:00 | By touching the floor |

== Futuristic Zone ==
| Name of game | Explanation | Time | ALIS |
|---|---|---|---|
| Planet swing | Swing between five planets to reach the crystal | 3:00 | By falling off the planets onto the floor |
| Radioactive chamber | Use grabs to pass the crystal along a chamber without touching the top or bottom | 2:30 | By touching the top or bottom with the capsule three times |
| Block grid | Place blocks into a grid, whilst adhering to a set of rules | 3:00 | None |
| Laser maze | Navigate a maze of laser gates to reach the crystal. Each gate opens for a fixed amount of time, during which you can pass through. Breaking a laser beam three times means the contestant is locked in. | 2:00 | By breaking a laser beam three times |
| Laser shards | Pass through laser beams, collecting shards to release the crystal | 3:00 | By breaking a laser beam three times |
| Piano tune | Memorise a tune, fix the piano then play back the tune to release the crystal | 3:00 | None |
| Microchip motherboard | Navigate a maze, plugging in microchips to release the crystal | 2:00 | None |
| Chemical riddles | Answer two out of three riddles correctly to release the crystal | None | None |
| Asteroid fuel | Connect a flexible pipe to release the crystal | 2:00 | By disturbing three asteroids |
| Laser guide | Guide a ring along a laser beam | 2:30 | By breaking the laser beam three times |
| Planet balance | Balance across five wobbly planets to reach the crystal | 2:00 | By falling off the planets onto the floor |
| Decoy balls | Spin dials to the correct position to open a container, then find the crystal within the balls | 3:00 | None |
| Laser targets | Shoot a laser at numbered targets to add up to 100 | 2:30 | None |
| Ball sort | Sort coloured balls into the correct tubes to release the crystal | 3:00 | None |
| Tube spectrum | Arrange coloured tubes in the correct order to create a colour spectrum | 3:00 | None |
| Button combination | Press the correct combination of buttons to illuminate the word CRYSTAL | 2:30 | None |
| Moving blocks | Stop all of the coloured blocks moving within their perimeter using different coloured buttons | 3:00 | None |
| Virtual reality | Navigate through a virtual obstacle course that can only be seen by assisting team mates, going back to the start if player accidentally touches an obstacle | 3:00 | None |
| Planet ropes | Swing across the planets hanging from the ceiling to get to the crystal | 3:00 | By falling off the planets onto the floor |
| Countdown | Press every numbered button on the wall from 100 to 1 | 3:00 | By pressing the wrong button |
| Planet order | Slide the 8 planets into the correct distance from the sun | 3:00 | None |
| Button sequence | Whilst sitting on a spinning chair, memorise a sequence of eight coloured buttons, then repeat the sequence within ten seconds. If the wrong button is pressed or the sequence isn't repeating in ten seconds, the sequence will be played again. | 3:00 | None |
| Stroop balls | Place each coloured ball into the tube stated on the screen, each tube will be a certain colour with a different colour written on the side in a different colour. The name of the colour written on the screen must match the name colour written on the side of the tube to be correct. Put twenty balls in the correct place to release the crystal | 2:00 | None |

== Industrial Zone ==
| Name of game | Explanation | Time | ALIS |
|---|---|---|---|
| Reactor box | Navigate five spinning podiums, pressing buttons along the way to release the crystal | 2:00 | By falling onto the floor three times |
| Reset buttons | Press a combination of buttons to turn off lights and reveal a code to release the crystal | 2:30 | None |
| Carousel generator | Turn a carousel to access tools used to open a box containing the crystal | 3:00 | None |
| Pipe maze | Navigate the crystal along a pipe to release it | 2:00 | None |
| Number pairs | Connect wires between pairs that are the same value | 3:00 | None |
| Pathway roll | Stop moving blocks to create a pathway for the crystal to roll down and be released | 2:00 | None |
| Clock calculation | Add and subtract various times to clocks in a sequence to release the crystal | 3:00 | None |
| Door codes | Calculate the code to open a series of doors. The code to each door must be remembered to be able to exit. | 3:00 | None |
| Phone sequence | Answer phones in a sequence, each giving a clue to the next one to answer. | 3:00 | None |
| Word grid | Place shapes on a grid of letters to make four four-letter words | 2:00 | None |
| Ball drop | Collect balls as they drop from various mechanisms and fill a tube to release the crystal | 3:00 | None |
| Air jet maze | Use an air jet to navigate a ball around a maze | 3:00 | None |
| Pipework puzzle | Use puzzle pieces to complete a pipe network on the floor | 3:00 | None |
| Shutter maze | Navigate a shutter maze to find the crystal and then escape the room | 2:00 | None |
| Pathway gaps | Raise bridges in the correct order as the crystal rolls down a pathway | 3:00 | None |
| See-saw balance | Balance on see-saws to guide and release the crystal | 2:30 | None |
| Rope swing | Swing on a rope to reach and press ten buttons within ten seconds | 3:00 | By touching the floor |
| Crate crawl | Navigate through a three dimensional maze of crates to get to the crystal | 2:00 | None |
| Moving path | Stop the moving parts in the right place to make a path for the crystal | 3:00 | None |
| Incinerator | Reverse the conveyor belt that's carrying the crystal to the incinerator by connecting the correct numbers, letters and symbols using the correctly coloured wires. | 2:30 | None |
| Upside down puzzle | Complete the puzzle (such as jigsaw or slide) on top of a transparent window on the floor, then go underneath the window to see the eight digit code that opens the safe that the crystal is in | 3:00 | None |
| Letter search | Find the eight letters hidden around the room which are an anagram of the password that will release the crystal | 3:00 | None |
| Spinning maze | Whilst lying on top of a suspended plank, roll the crystal to the middle of a rotating maze | 2:00 | By falling onto the floor |
| Stop clock | Stop all of the clocks in the room (each starting with different times) at exactly 28 seconds | 2:00 | If three clocks are not stopped after 28 seconds |
| Ball pipes | Move the red pipes so fifteen balls can each fall into the matching coloured container | 2:30 | If three balls fall into the wrong coloured container |

== Medieval Zone ==
| Name of game | Explanation | Time | ALIS |
|---|---|---|---|
| Riddle scrolls | Answer two out of three riddles correctly to escape with the crystal | None | By answering two out of three riddles incorrectly |
| Balancing tree | Balance twelve apples on a tree to release the crystal | 2:00 | None |
| Word chain | Use objects to form a word chain and release the crystal | 3:00 | None |
| Drawbridge | Put planks in the wall to make a bridge to escape with the crystal | 2:00 | By touching the floor covered in fog |
| Room escape | Follow the clues to escape the room | 3:00 | None |
| Cannon anagram | Fire a cannon at targets to reveal an anagram of the crystal location | 2:30 | None |
| Fan assemble | Build a fan to blow a target and release the crystal | 2:00 | None |
| Synonym dominoes | Arrange the dominoes so adjacent words are synonyms to release the crystal | 3:00 | None |
| Numeral grid | Arrange Roman Numerals in a 3x3 grid such that the numbers in each 2x2 grid add up to a specific value | 2:00 | None |
| Portcullis maze | Navigate a maze of portcullises, raising each one fully before passing through | 3:00 | Being touched by the knight |
| Key collection | Use a hook to collect keys through a grill to open a chest | 3:00 | None |
| King's wages | Solve riddles to distribute coins between five containers | 3:00 | None |
| Potion riddles | Answer two out of three riddles correctly to release the crystal | None | None |
| Closing walls | Guide keys through mazes to unlock gates and escape the room with the crystal | 2:00 | None |
| Jester's puzzle | Decode instructions to find where in the room the crystal is located | 2:30 | None |
| Jewel mine | Transport jewels up a hill in a mine cart to release the crystal | 3:00 | By touching the floor covered in fog |
| Angled mirrors | Move mirrors to direct the beam of light to a target | 2:00 | None |
| Map string | Place flags on a world map in answer to five questions. Then join a string between the flags and open the box with the same shape. | 2:30 | None |

== Eastern Zone ==
| Name of game | Explanation | Time | ALIS |
|---|---|---|---|
| Spot the difference | Spot the five differences between two adjacent rooms by placing a large ring on each difference | 3:00 | None |
| Candle pathway | Raise the gates to move the candle along a conveyor belt to burn the string | 2:30 | None |
| Yin Yang | Roll a black ball and a white ball down a ramp onto the correct place on a spinning Yin Yang | 2:30 | None |
| Dragon tube | Use levers to shake the crystal uphill through the dragon tube | 2:00 | None |
| Tiered house | Build a tiered house on the hinged platform making sure the platform stays upright using the rope. | 3:00 | By letting three pieces of the house fall on the floor |
| Cannon and gong | Use a cannon to fire a rock at the gong so it will bounce off and knock the crystal off of its stand | 2:00 | None |
| Knick-knack riddles | Answer two out of three riddles correctly by putting the correct objects on the table to be transported into the basket | None | None |
| Number Tower | Rotate the blocks so that each side of the tower adds up to 15 | 3:00 | None |
