= Challenge Anneka =

British entertainment reality programme

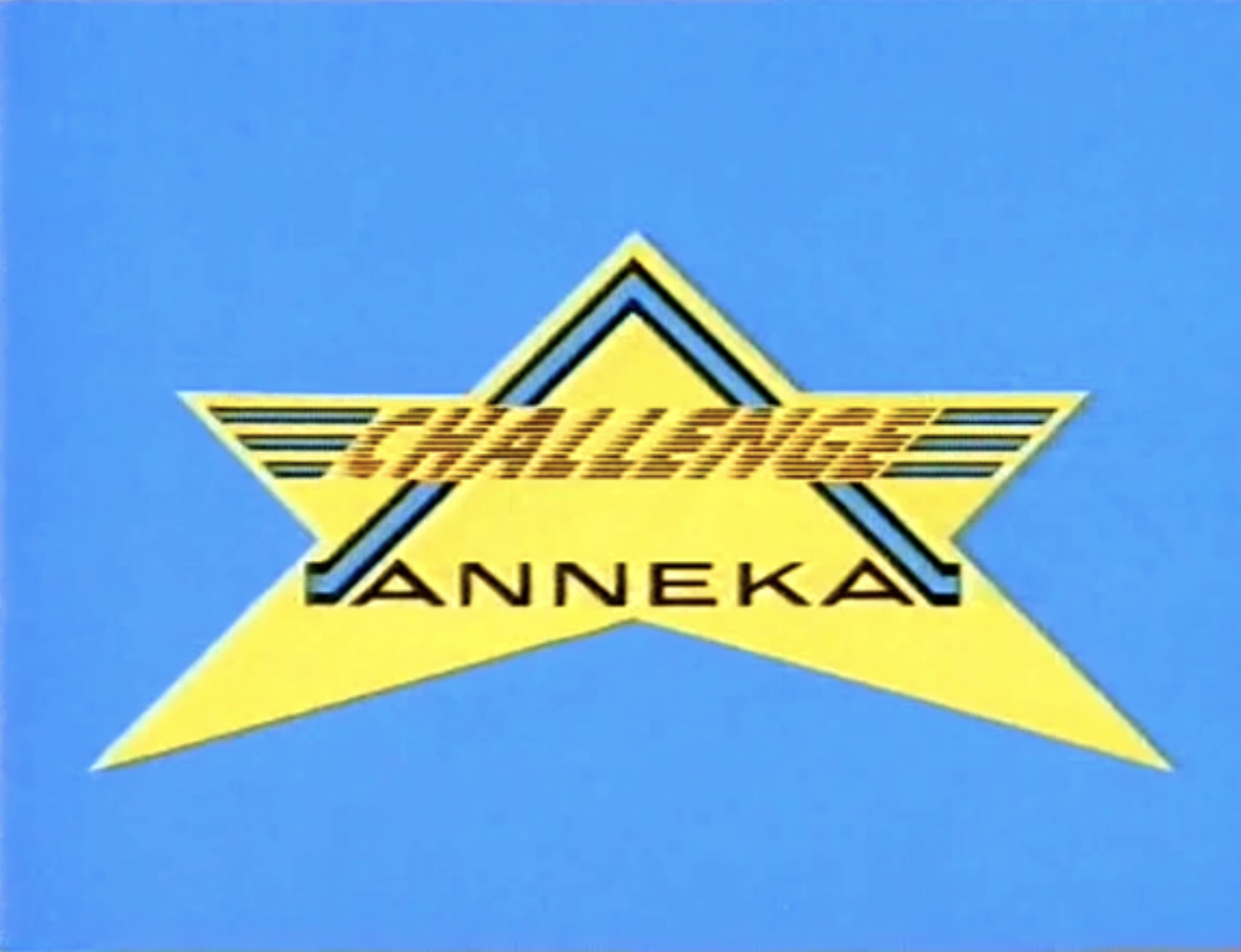
- Series 3-6 Logo (1991–1994)
- Genre: Reality
- Created by: Anneka Rice; Malcolm Heyworth
- Presented by: Anneka Rice
- Country of origin: United Kingdom
- Original language: English
- No. of series: 8
- No. of episodes: 70 (list of episodes)

Production
- Running time: 40–70 minutes
- Production companies: Chatsworth Television (1987); Mentorn (1989–95); ITV Productions (2006–07); Twofour & Krempelwood (2023-25)

Original release
- Network: BBC1
- Release: 8 September 1989 – 15 October 1995
- Network: ITV
- Release: 26 December 2006 – 6 June 2007
- Network: Channel 5
- Release: 18 March 2023 – 5 October 2025

Challenge Anneka is a British reality television programme that originally aired on BBC1 from 8 September 1989 to 15 October 1995 and is hosted by Anneka Rice. The series was revived on two occasions: for two specials by ITV for Christmas 2006 and summer 2007; and with a four-part series broadcast from 2023 to 2025 by Channel 5.

== Transmissions ==
Series	Episodes	Originally released		
Series	Episodes	First released	Last released	Network
Pilot	1	27 November 1987 (Live); 1 January 1988 (Edited)		BBC1
1	10	8 September 1989	10 November 1989	BBC1
2	10	10 November 1990	12 January 1991	BBC1
3	11	14 September 1991	3 January 1992	BBC1
4	9	11 September 1992	27 November 1992	BBC1
5	8	27 August 1993	16 October 1993	BBC1
6	7	3 September 1994	15 October 1994	BBC1
7	8	27 August 1995	15 October 1995	BBC1
Specials	2	26 December 2006	6 June 2007	ITV1
8	4	18 March 2023	5 October 2025	5

== Format ==
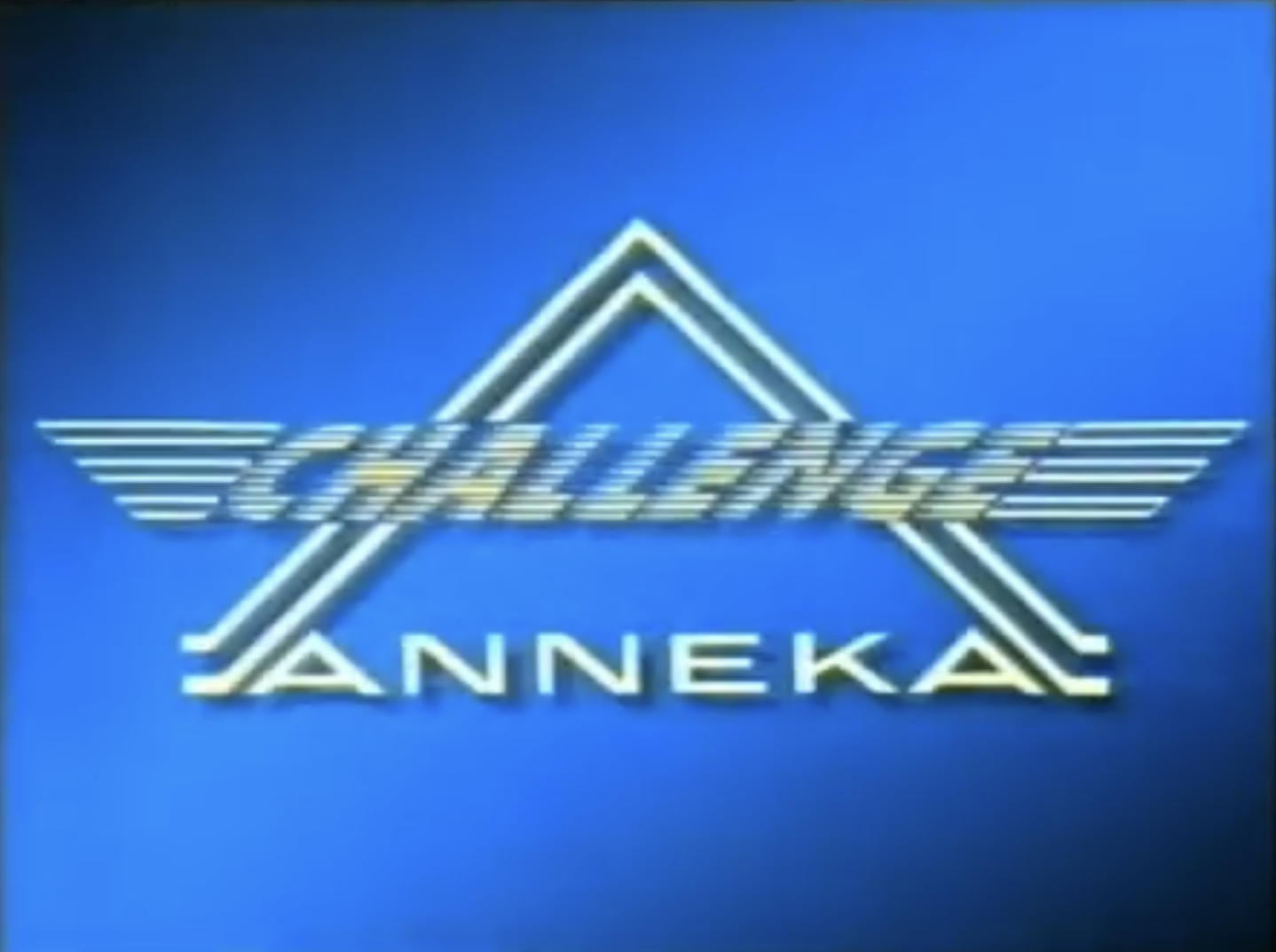
Series 1 and 2 logo (1989–1991)

Series 7 logo (1995)

The series was devised by Hugh Wooldridge (Creative Consultant) and Malcolm Heyworth as a vehicle for Anneka Rice, who had previously appeared on Treasure Hunt, one of the first big hits for Channel 4 and was initially produced by Chatsworth Television and piloted ad part of 1987's edition of Children in Need. It then went to series and produced by Mentorn Films for the original BBC run.

The format of Challenge Anneka involved Rice being given a task to accomplish within a certain period, usually two or three days. She was supposed to have no knowledge of what the task of each particular episode would be before it began, and would have to organise its accomplishment by persuading companies and people to contribute their time and resources for free. The task would usually be in aid of a charitable cause, for example building a play area for children within the local community, or something similar.

Rice would be based during the 'challenges' in a large blue truck, and for her frequent trips to persuade companies and people to take part she initially employed the use of; a Volkswagen based beach buggy in the first three series, a kit built Dakar 4x4 vehicle from series 4-7, a Jeep buggy in the ITV specials, and both a beach and 4x4 buggy in the eighth series. Rice was also accompanied by a dog named Pedro in the sixth and seventh series. The seventh series evolved from the previous, with a new variation of theme tune, logo and, on alternating episodes, a format tweak involving small scale mini Challenges running alongside the main Challenge. She was also distinguished by her frequent use of her mobile phone to organise the projects, years before they became common everyday objects for people in Britain.

Another trademark aspect of the series would be the frequent on-screen presence of Rice's soundman, Dave Chapman, part of the camera team who followed her around as she attempted to accomplish the challenges and who often found himself having to lend a helping hand. Most of the popularity of the series came from the tension of whether Rice and her teams of volunteers would accomplish their tasks before the deadlines set. Sometimes they would fail, but usually on such occasions those who had agreed to help out would carry on the following day to complete the work.

The original Mentorn/BBC series was usually shot April–July/August and transmitted September–October; the exception being series 2, which was shot August–November 1990 and broadcast November 1990–January 1991 due to Rice having a baby between the first and second series. The two ITV Specials were shot November 2006 and April 2007 and the Channel 5 series September–November 2022.

The format was sold to many European countries, each with a different host. In the late 1990s, the show was produced by Mentorn in the United States as Challenge America (ABC), hosted by Erin Brockovich.

== ITV revival ==
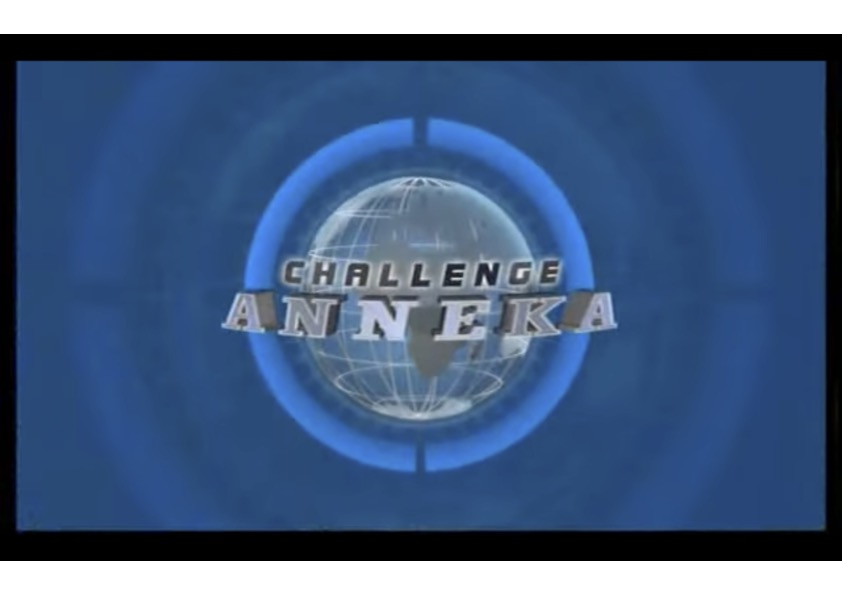
ITV Specials Logo (2006-07)

Challenge Anneka returned in December 2006 with a 'one-off' special on ITV, on Boxing Day and featured the team helping World Vision to rebuild a maternity clinic, a cricket pavilion and a children's play centre in Sri Lanka after the 2004 Tsunami disaster. This was shot in November 2006.

The premise of the 2007 special originated from Rice walking on stage, along with television crew, during a McFly concert in Cambridge, to ask the band if they would record a single for charity – to accomplish the Challenge of recording an album to raise money for children's hospices around the UK. Shot in April 2007, it was broadcast on 6 June 2007, with the charity album released two days prior.

The two specials achieved audiences of 3.3m and 2.9m viewers, respectively, barely entering the channel's top 30 programmes of the given weeks. A third special, reported in the press at the time of the revived format, was never completed, as ITV dropped their plans to revive the series in a frequent format.

Following ITV abandoning their plans of a full revival, in 2009 Rice approached the BBC about a proposed revival as part of Children in Need night (where the format of Challenge Anneka had first been tested in 1987) to mark the 20th anniversary of the series. The BBC did not proceed with the proposal, citing that the series was no longer in the public consciousness.

== Channel 5 revival ==
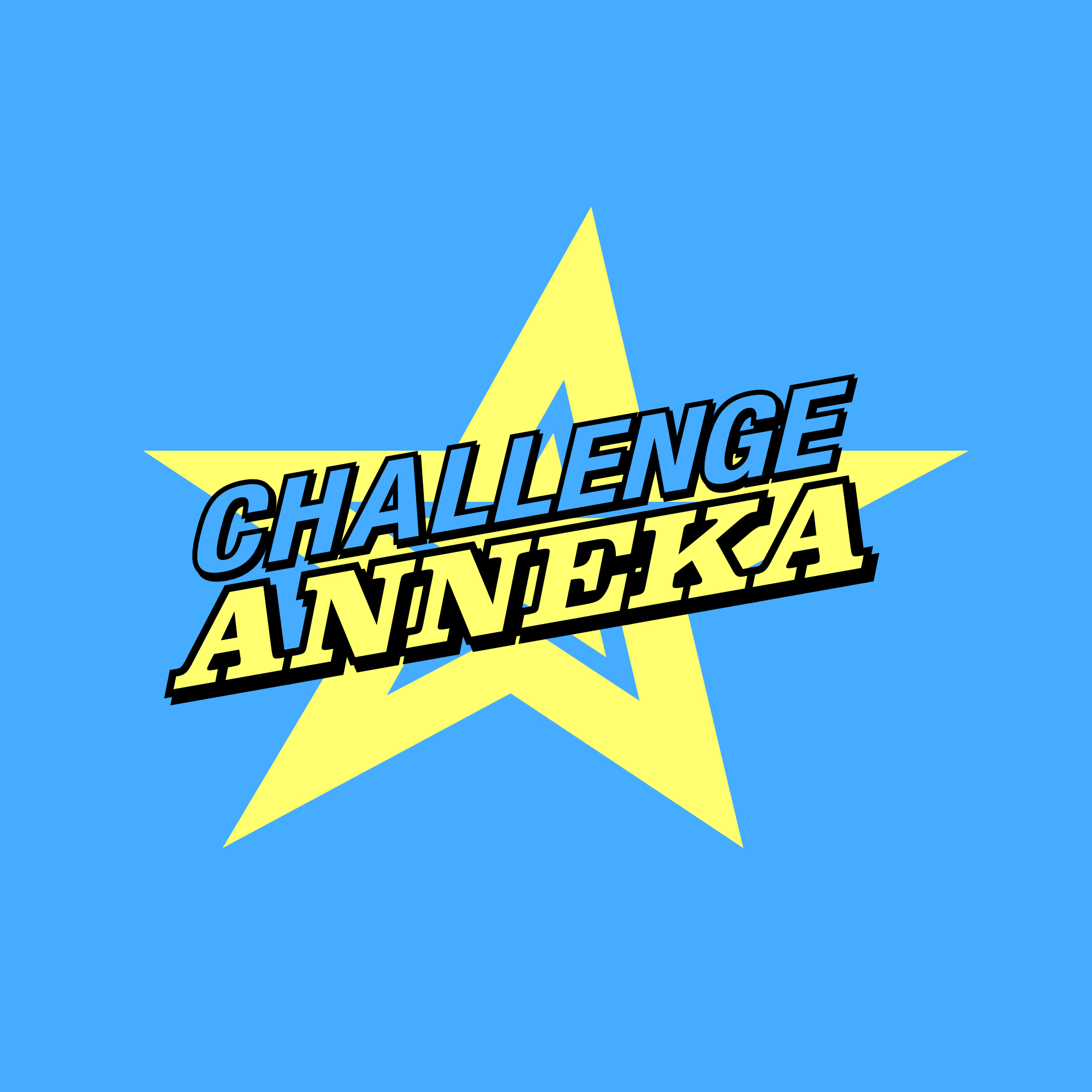
Series 8 logo (2023–25)

On 23 May 2022, it was announced that the series would be revived again, this time on Channel 5 for a four-part series. This was shot from September to November 2022; the first two broadcast in March 2023, with the postponement of the remaining two - attributed to low ratings - to May 2023 and October 2025 respectively.The 4 episodes achieved ratings of 1.25m, 660k, 520k and 163k.

The revival received a mixed reception. A review for the i newspaper opined that it lacked "emotional clout" and explicitly suffered from "diminished brand recognition" that mean it struggled to "justify [its] existence" against other similar shows, while a review in The Guardian was more positive, writing that it "is odd for a show that was so of its time [...] to feel as if it has never really been away, but Challenge Anneka slots back into the schedules perfectly well".

In August 2025, Channel 5 controller Ben Frow announced that the show would not be returning for a new series. Speaking at the Edinburgh International Television Festival, Frow stated that "we realised two weeks before we put it out, it's a make up show and they did home renovation shows since then. And the world changed so much what Anneka was doing which was innovative 30 years ago it was [different to] now, and we won't go there again."
