= La Tête et les Jambes =

French television game show

- Created by: Jacques Antoine
- Presented by: Pierre Bellemare
- Country of origin: France

Original release
- Network: RTF
- Release: 20 October 1960 – June 26, 1978

La Tête et les Jambes (English: Head and Legs) is a French game show which was broadcast from October 20 1960 to September 15 1975 to June 26 1978. It was created by Jacques Antoine in 1957 as a sequence in the show Télé Match, it was presented by Pierre Bellemare.

== Principle of the game show ==
The game combines two competitors: a competitor ("the head") has to answer complex questions on a specific topic. In a case of failure, a high-level competitor ("legs"), must catch up with their opponent by performing a minimum performance to allow him to stay in the game.

If one competitor reaches the end of the 24 questions (6 questions per week for 4 weeks), they will earn 100,000 francs.

== Bibliography ==
- Michel Drucker et Gilles Verlant, Les 500 Émissions mythiques de la télévision française, Coll. Histoire et Act, Flammarion, 2012 ISBN 978-2081245624
