= Interceptor (game show) =

British television game show (1989)

- Created by: Jacques Antoine; Jean-Jacques Pasquier; Malcolm Heyworth
- Presented by: Annabel Croft
- Starring: Sean O'Kane (as the Interceptor)
- Country of origin: United Kingdom
- Original language: English
- No. of series: 1
- No. of episodes: 8

Production
- Running time: 60 minutes (including adverts)
- Production companies: Chatsworth and Thames

Original release
- Network: ITV
- Release: 19 July 1989 – 1 January 1990

Related
- Treasure Hunt; The Crystal Maze

Interceptor is a British game show created by Jacques Antoine, Jean Jacques Pasquier and Malcolm Heyworth. It was produced by Chatsworth in association with Thames and shown on the ITV network during the summer of 1989, with one last episode held back and shown on 1 January 1990 for a New Year special. It was made in between Treasure Hunt and The Crystal Maze, game shows from the same production company.

The show was hosted by former tennis player and Treasure Hunt sky-runner Annabel Croft. The eponymous Interceptor was played by actor Sean O'Kane.

Only eight episodes (one series) were made (after an un-aired test pilot). It was re-run on digital TV channel Challenge many times between 2001 and 2015. A public vote on UKGameshows in 2002 saw the series voted the UK's 13th best game show.

== Format ==
Each episode of the series was based, like Treasure Hunt, in a region of the UK and began from a local tourist attraction. The host, Annabel Croft, would introduce the episode's two contestants, one woman (the yellow contestant) and one man (the blue contestant). Each contestant would be given a locked backpack - one would contain £1,000 in cash, the other containing nothing but weights. Both backpacks had five large infrared receptors on the back. The contestants would be blindfolded and taken by helicopter to locations in the area. The challenge was for both contestants, under radio guidance from Croft, to obtain the key to their opposite number's backpack - usually, some distance away from their start point - and meet up, all within a 40-minute time limit.

The task was simple enough, except for some obstructions placed in their way. Principal among these was the titular Interceptor, a tall man dressed in black, armed with an infrared projector mounted on his left forearm (the technology for which was procured from the British Army), and possessed of an intimidating fish-eagle screech and a catchphrase, "I LIKE IT!" whenever he spotted a contestant from his helicopter or if he won at the end of an episode. His role was to pursue the contestants and - to the accompaniment of post-production sound effects - 'zap' the receptors on their backpacks, causing the locks to jam. Thus, if the contestant carrying the money is 'zapped', neither contestant wins. (Although not declared in the programme, the Interceptor was only allowed a maximum of 20 "zaps" per show, and had a digital readout on his laser projector which informed him of how many shots he had left).

Distance was also a major enemy to the contestant, causing them to ask or borrow any mode of transport available to them. During the course of the series, more or less everything from bicycles to Sea King helicopters were used. The Interceptor, too, was able to hijack available transportation, but had his own fleet available to him. The most-used of these was his black-and-yellow Agusta A109 helicopter registered G-MEAN, piloted by his long-suffering pilot 'Mikey' (played by helicopter pilot Michael Malric-Smith). Also, at his disposal, was a Maserati Biturbo Spyder sports car registration INT 1, and a Kawasaki ZX10 motorbike registration INT 2. There was also an offroad Kawasaki KMX200 motorbike available with the registration INT 3 but was never used and only seen at the Interceptors lair in a few episodes. It was also claimed that a hovercraft was available to him, though, this was never used. The INT number plates were not real; the producers had special permission to film whilst using them.

The contestants' other major enemy was the time limit. Once they had located their key, they often had to perform a task in order to obtain it. Examples included participating in a limited jousting exercise, or removing the key from a horse's braided mane.

== Airing ==
The eight episodes were recorded over the summer of 1989 and shown soon afterwards. The first seven episodes were aired on a Wednesday. The only exception was the eighth and final episode, which was intended for a Christmas airing but was instead shown in the New Year. This episode included seasonal greetings from both Annabel and the Interceptor.

== Cancellation ==
Interceptor was shown at the time when ITV was undergoing major changes, and it became a casualty of them. Interceptor was never recommissioned for a subsequent series. While ITV franchise Thames wanted to propose Interceptor for another ITV network commission in 1990, Thames was already responsible for a very large section of ITV's prime-time shows and other companies wanted a greater proportion. A new round of franchise bidding was impending, and Thames was concerned to improve its profitability; Interceptor was a relatively expensive show and was made by an independent contractor. In the event, Thames lost its franchise to Carlton which had put in a larger bid.

No further series of the programme were made and on New Year's Eve 1992, Thames lost its franchise, being replaced by Carlton on New Year's Day 1993. Thames continued as an independent production company.

== Repeats ==
Despite its termination, Interceptor retains a cult following. Pressure exerted by fans led to digital TV channel Challenge repeating the series occasionally from 2001 to 2015 alongside other game shows, among which were stablemates Treasure Hunt and The Crystal Maze.

== Memorable moments ==
=== Episode 1: Kent ===
Contestant Mark had to get his key from a hive of bees. The Interceptor chased contestant Candy (who was traveling in a Rolls-Royce) on horseback. Towards the end of the episode, the Interceptor successfully snuck up on an oblivious Mark and zapped his backpack at point-blank range. After doing so, he screamed into his ear. Ironically, the vehicles both contestants were traveling in actually passed each other with seconds to go. Even if they had realised and stopped the vehicles, they wouldn't have won the money as, although Candy's backpack opened, Mark's backpack had been zapped with the money in it. As it ended up, Mark and Candy did not meet up within the 40-minute time limit anyway.

First broadcast on 19 July 1989.

=== Episode 2: Norfolk ===
While contestant Roger tried to get his key in the middle of a maze garden in Somerleyton Hall, the Interceptor planned an ambush. However, Roger got away before the Interceptor could zap him. Contestant Claire taunted the Interceptor from a train then went on a pleasure cruise to get near her key on the River Yare as Roger approached. The Interceptor hijacked a boat and attempted to stop them, but Roger and Claire met up within the time limit - they had well over a minute still to go - and won the £1,000, which was in Roger's backpack; in fact, it turned out the Interceptor had failed to zap either backpack. The Interceptor was also arrested by the police because he went over the speed limit on the river.

First broadcast on 26 July 1989.

=== Episode 3: Wye Valley ===
Contestant Mark enlisted the help of the army to find his key, and his partner Sue later used a canoe to collect her key from under a bridge. The episode ended with the Interceptor screeching over the bridge in his Maserati while Mark and Sue struggled to find each other. Unfortunately, although the two contestants met up with 1 minute remaining, the Interceptor had zapped both their backpacks (the money was in Sue's backpack).

First broadcast on 2 August 1989.

=== Episode 4: Cumbria ===
Contestant Max made his way on the Ravenglass and Eskdale Railway to his key challenge and the Interceptor climbed along the train in pursuit of Max. Contestant Suzanne got soaked in Wast Water while trying to get her key. At the end of the episode, the Interceptor blocked the entrance to the Eskdale Outward Bound Centre where contestant Suzanne was coming but her partner Max grabbed her just in time before the Interceptor, with only 6 seconds remaining. The two contestants won the money, which was in Suzanne's backpack (additionally, it turned out that the Interceptor had also failed to zap Max's backpack).

First broadcast on 9 August 1989.

=== Episode 5: Derbyshire ===
Contestant Martin had a brief chase with The Interceptor but got away in the nick of time. Contestant Hillary was unaware that she was taken on a ride in a tractor by the Interceptor. The farmers at the farm where she got the tractor even go as far as helping him, all because, of a money bribe of ten pounds, and a further ten pounds if his ambush was a success. When he locked Hillary's pack, he shrieked many times and yelled in joy, only for Hillary to jump on a nearby van, jokingly threatening to hit The Interceptor with a spade if he didn't leave her alone. Nevertheless, the ambush effort was futile, as the contestants failed to meet each other within the 40-minute time limit; as it happened, even had they succeeded in meeting up within the time limit, it would have been in vain, as, although Martin's backpack opened, Hilary's zapped backpack contained the money.

First broadcast on 16 August 1989.

=== Episode 6: Scottish Borders ===
The Interceptor wouldn't leave contestant Mike alone as he got his key from the top of a factory in a quarry, but while attempting an ambush, he was spotted by Mike and gave up. Contestant Sarah cycled down from her starting position to get to her key challenge on a river, only to see the Interceptor nearby in a dinghy. Mike and Sarah narrowly failed to meet up within the 40-minute time limit; and unfortunately, as it turned out, the Interceptor had also failed to zap either backpack, so the contestants would have won the £1,000, which was in Sarah's backpack.

First broadcast on 23 August 1989.

=== Episode 7: Cotswolds ===
Contestant Marcel had to escape the chasing Interceptor by quadbike. Contestant Nikki was taken to her key in the Fire Service College at the top of a burning building and when he started chasing her on foot she finds a way to escape quicker and the Interceptor lost her and at the end of the episode, Marcel was getting his key on a chariot race and the Interceptor was ready to zap him but he was too late as the contestants met with 28 seconds left. The contestants also won the £1,000 prize money as Nikki's backpack, which had the money in it, opened - and, as it happened, the Interceptor had in fact failed to zap Marcel's backpack as well.

First broadcast on 30 August 1989.

=== Episode 8: Cornwall ===
Contestant Clive was successfully ambushed by the Interceptor and had his backpack zapped from point-blank range; but he came up with a plan to save his partner Sarah from the Interceptor on a lifeboat. Contestant Sarah had a mini hovercraft ride before coming with the Interceptor but was protected by locals. Clive had arranged for an RAF helicopter to come and get her to meet him at the lifeboat but in a dramatic chase, the Interceptor's and the RAF helicopter both raced to reach Sarah. The episode was memorable for the Interceptor going to the extreme of going up to Sarah's face, shrieking, shooting his infrared gun only for the locals to protect her. Clive and Sarah succeeded in meeting up within the 40 minute time limit, with just 15 seconds remaining. Unfortunately, although Sarah's backpack opened, Clive had the money.

First broadcast on 1 January 1990.

== Production ==
Although each episode appeared to be filmed in real time, it was not. The introduction was filmed the day before the game itself, giving the producers opportunity to re-randomise the backpacks the contestants had chosen. The 40-minute game time was also somewhat elastic, with filming and gameplay often suspended.

Two helicopters were used in the production of the series supplied, as in Treasure Hunt by Cornwall-based company Castle Air. One of these was the Interceptor's aircraft, the black and yellow Agusta A109, with the registration G-MEAN. The other was G-BHXU, the same Agusta-Bell Jetranger helicopter used in Treasure Hunt, piloted here by Jerry Grayson.

The theme music, composed by Chatsworth's resident composer Zack Laurence, is an adaptation of Chopin's Etude in C minor, Opus 10 Number 12 titled Rock Revolution. It was released as a single with an 'instrumental' B-side (essentially the track minus the piano) titled Interceptor Boogie.

== Attempted U.S. version ==
The series was first tried as a possible American entry in 1989, with a pilot produced by Fries Entertainment airing in syndication during April of that year. Hosted by actor Erik Estrada, along with celebrity guests Barbi Benton and Bruce Boxleitner, it was not picked up as a series.
