= Chatsworth Television =

British television production company

Chatsworth Television was a British television production company, trading between 1973 and 2006. The best-known examples of their programmes are Treasure Hunt (Channel 4, 1982–1989 / BBC Two, 2002–2003), Interceptor (Thames Television for ITV, 1989–1990) and The Crystal Maze (Channel 4, 1990–1995). The company also collaborated with Central Television in the production of the darts quiz show Bullseye and produced the 1987 pilot of Challenge Anneka.
