= Sandra Caron =

British actress (1936–2025)

- Born: Sandra Leila Cogan; 27 August 1936; Stepney, East London, England
- Died: 1 September 2025 (aged 89); Los Angeles, California, U.S.
- Education: Aida Foster Theatre School
- Occupation: Actress
- Television: The Crystal Maze

Sandra Leila Cogan (27 August 1936 – 1 September 2025), known professionally as Sandra Caron, was a British actress. Born in Stepney in east London, she trained at the Aida Foster Theatre School. She took her stage name in honour of Leslie Caron in part to avoid accusations that she was trading on the popularity of her sister, Alma Cogan, who The Guardian described in 2002 as "the most highly paid woman in British show business in the 1950s and 1960s". In the late 1960s, Caron acted as part of The Second City in 20,000 Frozen Grenadiers and appeared in the films The Bliss of Mrs. Blossom and Carry On Camping. She married American actor Brian Greene in 1985 and made her final on-screen appearance in Agony Again. She also appeared on the Channel 4 game show The Crystal Maze, playing the fortune teller Mumsey in series 1, 2 and 4, and her sister Auntie Sabrina in series 3, from 1990 to 1993.

Caron published Alma Cogan: A Memoir in 1991 to commemorate the 25th anniversary of Cogan's death, and was performing Fifty Million Frenchmen at the Royal Opera House in London with Jessica Martin in June 2002 when she heard from Martin about the planned BBC Radio 4 series Stage Mother, Sequinned Daughter. It did not mention Caron, but did depict Alma as a drunkard and their mother as overbearing; she consulted with her barrister cousin, Ivan Lawrence, who advised her to seek an injunction to halt its broadcast. The injunction was unsuccessful, on the grounds that it did not devalue Cogan's estate; however, the BBC did apologise in December 2003, after the Broadcasting Standards Commission ruled that the series had been unfair on Cogan's surviving relatives. Caron had lived in Maida Vale, west London, though moved with Greene to Los Angeles in 2015. She died at the city's Cedars-Sinai Medical Center on 1 September 2025, six weeks after being hospitalised following extreme weight loss and several falls. She was 89.

== Filmography ==
Filmography per unless cited otherwise
Title	Year	Role
Not Only... But Also	1965	The White Woman
The Late Show	1966	Self
Don't Raise the Bridge, Lower the River	1968	Pinto's nurse
The Bliss of Mrs. Blossom	1968	Pet shop assistant
Carry on Camping	1969	Fanny
About Face	1989	Wife
The Green Man	1990	Mrs Klinger
Agony Again	1995	Lily

== Stage work ==
=== Selected stage credits ===
- The Boy Friend – ensemble cast member in touring productions of Sandy Wilson's musical, which played at the New Theatre, Hull, in March 1959 and March 1960.
- The Kitchen – played Monique, a waitress, in Arnold Wesker's play at the Royal Court Theatre, London, in 1961.
- From Rush Hour with Love – performer in a cabaret-style James Bond spoof staged at the Poor Millionaire, London EC2 (7 September – 10 October 1964) and at the Guinea and the Piggy, Leicester Square, London (October–November 1964).
- Billy Liar – cast member in a 1962 touring production of Keith Waterhouse and Willis Hall's play at the Grand Theatre, Wolverhampton, with the Alexandra Repertory Company.
- Inadmissible Evidence – appearance in a 1968 production of John Osborne's play at the Watford Palace Theatre for the Watford Palace Theatre Trust.
- ...And Another Thing – performer in the original London production of the musical revue at the Fortune Theatre, London, which opened on 6 October 1960.
- Ruby, Alfie – cast member in Corner Table Productions' 1992 tour of Hilary Gibb's stage adaptation, which played the New Theatre, Hull, the Lyceum Theatre, Sheffield, and other UK venues (28 October – 12 December 1992).
- Love and Maple Syrup – appeared in Louis Negin's Canadian musical revue, produced by Ruth Kalkstein and Edward Specter at the Mercer–Hansberry Theatre, New York, in 1970.
