= List of Challenge Anneka episodes =

The following is an episode list of the BBC, ITV and Channel 5 television series Challenge Anneka, with their related challenges. In all, there have been 70 episodes; the first 64 of these were broadcast on BBC One, two were broadcast on ITV1 and four on Channel 5. Episode names given are not official and are shown for reference only.

== Series overview ==
| Series | Episodes | Originally released | | |
| Series | Episodes | First released | Last released | Network |
|---|---|---|---|---|
| Pilot | 1 | 27 November 1987 (Live); 1 January 1988 (Edited) | | BBC1 |
| 1 | 10 | 8 September 1989 | 10 November 1989 | BBC1 |
| 2 | 10 | 10 November 1990 | 12 January 1991 | BBC1 |
| 3 | 11 | 14 September 1991 | 3 January 1992 | BBC1 |
| 4 | 9 | 11 September 1992 | 27 November 1992 | BBC1 |
| 5 | 8 | 27 August 1993 | 16 October 1993 | BBC1 |
| 6 | 7 | 3 September 1994 | 15 October 1994 | BBC1 |
| 7 | 8 | 27 August 1995 | 15 October 1995 | BBC1 |
| Specials | 2 | 26 December 2006 | 6 June 2007 | ITV1 |
| 8 | 4 | 18 March 2023 | 5 October 2025 | 5 |

== Episodes ==
=== Pilot (1987) ===
| No. overall | No. in series | Title | Running time | Original release date |
|---|---|---|---|---|
| 1 | — | "The Symphony Orchestra" | 80 minutes (Live); 40 minutes (Edited) | 27 November 1987 Live Inserts 1:50pm (10min), 3:35pm (5min), 5:35pm (25min), 8:20pm (40min)(Live); 1 January 1988 12.20pm (Edited) |
In aid of Children in Need, Anneka has to arrange a symphony orchestra to play the 1812 Overture in the middle of the River Thames to a backdrop of fireworks and ice dancing.

=== Series 1 (1989) ===
| No. overall | No. in series | Title | Running time | Original release date |
|---|---|---|---|---|
| 2 | 1 | "The Playbuses" | 40 minutes | 8 September 1989 8:20pm |
Ten double decker buses were converted into playbuses in 3 days for the National Playbus Association. Two buses were completed on time; the other eight partially refurbished for completion by the charity.
| 3 | 2 | "The Playground" | 40 minutes | 15 September 1989 8:20pm |
A rubbish tip in Northern Ireland was converted to a children's playground for the Ballynahinch community.
| 4 | 3 | "The White Horse" | 40 minutes | 22 September 1989 8:20pm |
The ancient chalk horse above Weymouth was renovated with the help of local scouts and mountain climbing enthusiasts. The challenge was not completed in time but the work was finished by local volunteers the following week. The work was subsequently criticised.
| 5 | 4 | "The Football Field" | 40 minutes | 29 September 1989 8:20pm |
A football pitch was returfed and new changing rooms were installed for the youngsters of Norbury Athletic Football Club, a group of youth teams in Stockport.
| 6 | 5 | "Ray Cooney Farce 'Dead Trouble' for Calibre Cassette Library for the Blind" | 40 minutes | 6 October 1989 8:20pm |
In 2 days, playwright Ray Cooney wrote and directed a new farce for the "Calibre" cassette library for the blind.
| 7 | 6 | "Walled Garden" | 40 minutes | 13 October 1989 8:20pm |
With the help of Alan Titchmarsh, and in aid of the Country Houses Association, a huge neglected Victorian walled garden in Royal Berkshire was transformed back to its original state in 33 hours.
| 8 | 7 | "Kent Railway Restoration" | 45 minutes | 20 October 1989 8:15pm |
At the request of the local community and volunteers of the Kent and East Sussex Railway, the local station at Northiam in Kent and the lines leading to it were renovated to allow steam trains to come to the town.
| 9 | 8 | "Recycled Joke Book" | 45 minutes | 27 October 1989 8:15pm |
In 36 hours, a joke book printed on recycled paper was put together in aid of Friends of the Earth. Ten thousand copies were produced.
| 10 | 9 | "Disabled Skiing Trip" | 45 minutes | 3 November 1989 8:15pm |
Twenty disabled young people were taken to Switzerland where they skied for the first time in their lives.
| 11 | 10 | "Series 1 Highlights" | 45 minutes | 10 November 1989 8:15pm |
Highlights from the first series.

=== Series 2 (1990–91) ===
| No. overall | No. in series | Title | Running time | Original release date |
|---|---|---|---|---|
| 12 | 1 | "Children's Parties" | 50 minutes | 10 November 1990 7:25pm |
In 2 days, a simultaneous party for six thousand needy children was organised in Scotland, Northern Ireland and Wales to coincide with the Paul O'Gorman Leukaemia Foundation's annual party in Battersea Park.
| 13 | 2 | "Seal Sanctuary" | 50 minutes | 17 November 1990 7:25pm |
In 2 days, a pool was made for orphan seals at the Middlebank Centre for the SSPCA.
| 14 | 3 | "Buxton Riding Centre for Disabled" | 50 minutes | 24 November 1990 7:25pm |
An old disused stables at a farm near Buxton were converted into a riding centre for the disabled.
| 15 | 4 | "Scilly Isles Jetty" | 50 minutes | 1 December 1990 7:25pm |
A low water quay was built on the island of Bryher in the Scilly Isles. The challenge was completed a day late due to the bad weather.
| 16 | 5 | "Barge" | 50 minutes | 8 December 1990 7:25pm |
An old Dutch barge was transformed into floating education centre for the community of Richmond in Surrey.
| 17 | 6 | "Lighthouse" | 50 minutes | 15 December 1990 7:25pm |
The Happisburgh Lighthouse was painted from top to bottom after Trinity House passed responsibility for its upkeep to the local village.
| 18 | 7 | "Romanian Orphanage" | 60 minutes | 22 December 1990 6:30pm |
Anneka and the team took on possibly their biggest challenge when they were given the task of renovating an orphanage in Siret which was home to 600 children, all living in appalling conditions. There was no sanitation or electricity and many of the children were seriously ill and emotionally and physically abused. The babies lived three to a cot in filthy rags and it was impossible to tell the children's ages or sex as they all had shaved heads and were so undernourished. The workforce from the UK pledged to make Siret a long term plan and made yearly visits to carry on renovation and repairs, not only in the orphanage but in the nearby town as well.
| 19 | 8 | "Pantomime" | 50 minutes | 29 December 1990 7:25pm |
The pantomime Cinderella was staged in Newcastle in 2 days with a cast entirely composed of members of the public for the benefit of local needy children and the elderly.
| 20 | 9 | "Reminiscence Centre" | 50 minutes | 5 January 1991 6:05pm |
In 2 days an unused ward at Rochford Hospital in Essex was converted into a reminiscence centre for elderly patients.
| 21 | 10 | "Homeless Hostel" | 50 minutes | 12 January 1991 6:05pm |
The conversion of a chapel in Telford into a hostel for homeless teenagers was completed in just 24 hours.

=== Series 3 (1991) ===
| No. overall | No. in series | Title | Running time | Original release date |
|---|---|---|---|---|
| 22 | 1 | "USPCA Dog Kennels" | 50 minutes | 14 September 1991 5:45pm |
The kennels at the USPCA's shelter in Carryduff were renovated in time for its open day.
| 23 | 2 | "Road" | 50 minutes | 21 September 1991 7:15pm |
In 4 days, an unmade-up road was surfaced for the residents of a small community in County Durham.
| 24 | 3 | "Paralympics Commercial" | 50 minutes | 28 September 1991 7:15pm |
A TV commercial was made in just 36 hours on behalf of the British Paralympics Association. It was transmitted on ITV at the end of the challenge.
| 25 | 4 | "Gloucester Theatre" | 50 minutes | 5 October 1991 7:15pm |
In 60 hours, the Gloucester Operatic and Dramatic Society's New Olymus Theatre was restored to its Edwardian splendour.
| 26 | 5 | "Church" | 50 minutes | 12 October 1991 7:15pm |
The challenge allowed just under 60 hours to renovate Mitcham Parish Church and organise the catering, outfits, flowers for the wedding of a young couple who would otherwise not have afforded to get married.
| 27 | 6 | "Monkey World" | 50 minutes | 19 October 1991 7:15pm |
The challenge, on behalf of the charity Zoo Check, was to build two quarantine houses for chimpanzees at Monkey World in Dorset.
| 28 | 7 | "Birmingham Children's Hospital" | 50 minutes | 26 October 1991 7:15pm |
In two and half days, a piece of hospital wasteland was transformed into a specialised playground to cater for the needs of sick children at the Birmingham Children's Hospital. The challenge was issued by the then Duke of Edinburgh, Prince Philip, on behalf of the National Playing Fields Association.
| 29 | 8 | "Cambridgeshire Holiday Camp" | 50 minutes | 2 November 1991 7:15pm |
In 2 days, a field was transformed into a fully equipped holiday camp in time for the arrival of six children from inner city London who were being treated to the holiday of a lifetime by the charity the Children's Country Holiday Funds.
| 30 | 9 | "Childline Calendar" | 50 minutes | 9 November 1991 7:15pm |
In 73 hours, 10,000 copies of the 1992 Childline Calendar "Children at Play" were printed using photos chosen from thousands received in response to a public appeal.
| 31 | 10 | "180-foot Bridge" | 50 minutes | 16 November 1991 7:15pm |
In just under 4 days, a footbridge of steel and wood was built over the River Camel at Wadebridge, Cornwall. Its completion culminated in a huge party for the whole town which had been reunited by the footbridge. This is known locally as the Challenge Bridge.
| 32 | - | "Return To Siret" | 40 minutes | 3 January 1992 8:20pm |
40 minute update on the Romanian orphanage project.

=== Series 4 (1992) ===
| No. overall | No. in series | Title | Running time | Original release date |
|---|---|---|---|---|
| 33 | 1 | "Best of Challenge Anneka Series 1–3" | 60 minutes | 11 September 1992 8:00pm |
A compilation of the best and worst moments from the previous 3 series. Presented from Monkey World, Dorset.
| 34 | 2 | "Heeley City Farm" | 60 minutes | 18 September 1992 8:00pm |
A 77-hour challenge to partially refurbish and rebuild the animal housing at the Heeley City Farm in Sheffield run by the volunteers. It also included an appeal for new animals.
| 35 | 3 | "Tommy's Tape" | 60 minutes | 25 September 1992 8:00pm |
Anneka was challenged by Tommy's Campaign to produce a cassette tape (plus 9,999 copies) of children's songs and nursery rhymes performed by celebrities in time for premature baby, Danielle Healy, to go home.
| 36 | 4 | "Ilfracombe Library" | 60 minutes | 2 October 1992 8:00pm |
The challenge involved moving a dilapidated old library building from its site in the middle of Ilfracombe to be resurrected as a community centre in the Slade Valley, half a mile away. The time set was 51 hours.
| 37 | 5 | "Albrighton Angling Centre" | 60 minutes | 9 October 1992 8:00pm |
A two and half day challenge was to create an angling facility for the disabled. Anneka had to evacuate the site, have a moat designed and take delivery of 200 fresh fish and 200,000 gallons of water in time for an angling competition.
| 38 | 6 | "Mencap Nursery" | 60 minutes | 16 October 1992 8:00pm |
The challenge involved renovating a dilapidated old school building into a nursery for Leeds Mencap in 55 hours. Additionally, from the thousands of paintings sent in response to a radio appeal, Anneka had to select a winning entry and have 25,000 copies of a Christmas card produced in time for the nursery's opening.
| 39 | 7 | "Red Sea Diving" | 60 minutes | 23 October 1992 8:00pm |
Anneka was challenged by Trevor Jones, a tetraplegic, to give himself and nine other disabled people the chance to learn to scuba dive. After a day's training in London, the team flew to Eilat for a further day in a pool and finally into the Red Sea.
| 40 | 8 | "Cumbrae Sports Centre" | 60 minutes | 6 November 1992 8:00pm |
The 72 hour challenge involved transforming a derelict shell of an old building into a recreation/sports centre for the Greycraigs Outdoor Centre on the Isle of Cumbrae. The climax was a rally of 1,000 cyclists arriving at the renovated building at the deadline.
| 41 | 9 | "Africa Medical Centre" | 60 minutes | 27 November 1992 8:00pm |
Anneka has 5 days to equip a medical centre in Malawi as well as drill a new bore hole for fresh water.

=== Series 5 (1993) ===
| No. overall | No. in series | Title | Running time | Original release date |
|---|---|---|---|---|
| 42 | 1 | "Live Croatia Appeal" | 60 minutes | 27 August 1993 8:00pm |
Anneka launched the Croatia appeal live from the BT Tower appealing for materials to rebuild a school in Pakrac and the goods to be taken on convoy to Croatia. Simon Bates delivered the challenge to Anneka on behalf of the British Red Cross hours before she was due to transmit her live compilation programme. The show also included a look back at the best and worst moments from the past four series and interviewed past participants live on air.
| 43 | 2 | "Boathouse" | 50 minutes | 4 September 1993 7:25pm |
Anneka received a challenge from two children from West Buckland School in North Devon to refurbish a derelict barn and turn it into a boathouse for use by disabled people. The boathouse belonged to the Exmoor Calvert Trust based at Wistlandpound Farm near Barnstaple.
| 44 | 3 | "Soup Kitchen" | 50 minutes | 11 September 1993 8:15pm |
Anneka was challenged to refurbish the soup kitchen for the homeless at the Social Care Unit at St Martin in the Fields in London and to provide a 150 meals a day for a year.
| 45 | 4 | "Maze" | 55 minutes | 18 September 1993 7:05pm |
Anneka was challenged by the RNIB College in Worcester to build a multi-sensory maze for the blind.
| 46 | 5 | "NCH Commercial" | 55 minutes | 25 September 1993 7:05pm |
Anneka had just 3 days to make a commercial for the National Children's Home to be premiered in front of 1,000 children at the Odeon Leicester Square.
| 47 | 6 | "Disabled Bungalows" | 55 minutes | 2 October 1993 7:05pm |
Anneka had 52 hours to convert two bungalows in Edgware for wheelchair use by two disabled residents. The challenge also involved renovating the day room at the nearby hospital for Aspire and the Guinness Trust.
| 48 | 7 | "Fashion Range for The Rainbows Trust" | 50 minutes | 9 October 1993 7:20pm |
Gail Moore, of the Cope Children's Trust's Rainbow Appeal, challenged Anneka to create a range of clothes for children and mothers, the sale of which was to raise money to run the sixth children's hospice in the UK.
| 49 | 8 | "Croatia" | 55 minutes | 16 October 1993 7:15pm |
The British Red Cross challenged Anneka to take food and hygiene supplies to the former Yugoslavia and to renovate a school in Pakrac, Croatia to enable children returning to an area of devastation to renew their education. 30 trucks, as a result of a nationwide appeal, travelled to Croatia. The school was renovated just in time for the children to arrive for their first school day.

=== Series 6 (1994) ===
| No. overall | No. in series | Title | Running time | Original release date |
|---|---|---|---|---|
| 50 | 1 | "Wormwood Scrubs Riding School" | 50 minutes | 3 September 1994 8:10pm |
The challenge involved improving the facilities at Wormwood Scrubs Pony Centre by building an indoor riding school and thus helping the disabled riders to carry on during the winter months. The time set for the challenge was 72 hours.
| 51 | 2 | "Burnham-on-Sea" | 50 minutes | 10 September 1994 8:10pm |
Burnham-on-Sea area rescue boat crew challenged Anneka to build and equip an inshore rescue boat station on the esplanade at Burnham-on-Sea in 72 hours.
| 52 | 3 | "Patti Pavilion" | 50 minutes | 17 September 1994 7:10pm |
The Patti Pavilion Trust challenged Anneka to renovate the 19th century Winter Gardens donated by Adelina Patti in 1920. The challenge took 54 hours and included the staging of the inaugural concert.
| 53 | 4 | "Playboats" | 50 minutes | 24 September 1994 7:10pm |
The Harriet Trust challenged Anneka to move a 70ft trawler from Holyhead, Wales to Millom, Cumbria – take it out of the water and place it in dry dock next to their existing boat. Both boats were then transformed into playspaces for the benefit of children with disabilities who attend the outdoor holiday centre. The challenge time set was 54 hours.
| 54 | 5 | "Recipe Book" | 50 minutes | 1 October 1994 7:10pm |
Breakthrough Breast Cancer challenged Anneka to create a charity recipe book featuring dishes by celebrities and members of the public, then cook a banquet for 100 invited guests to celebrate the launch of "100 Recipes in No Time at All".
| 55 | 6 | "YCTV Studio" | 50 minutes | 8 October 1994 7:10pm |
Anneka was challenged to create a television studio out of a disused showroom in West London to become the base for a children's TV station, YCTV, to teach TV skills to inner city children.
| 56 | 7 | "Romanian Hospital" | 50 minutes | 15 October 1994 7:10pm |
Medic One challenged Anneka to move an entire hospital Casualty Unit from Dunfermline Scotland to rebuild it 1,830 miles away in a remote town in Central Romania. The programme also included an update on the Romanian orphanage in Siret.

=== Series 7 (1995) ===
| No. overall | No. in series | Title | Running time | Original release date |
|---|---|---|---|---|
| 57 | 1 | "Sheffield Circus" | 50 minutes | 27 August 1995 7:00pm |
At the Meadowhall Shopping Centre in Sheffield, Anneka was challenged to transform a redundant church into a circus skills centre for the Greentop Community Circus in 53 hours. Also undertaken were 15 smaller projects by local volunteers.
| 58 | 2 | "Royal Albert Hall Deaf Concert" | 50 minutes | 3 September 1995 7:30pm |
The RNID issued a challenge to stage a concert in 28 hours featuring deaf performers for a deaf audience at the Royal Albert Hall.
| 59 | 3 | "The War Memorial" | 50 minutes | 10 September 1995 7:30pm |
Anneka Rice and the team have 2 days to move a war memorial from the top of a hill to a landscaped garden in Bathgate in Lothian in time for the VE day parade. Also undertaken were 127 smaller projects by local volunteers.
| 60 | 4 | "WRVS Book" | 50 minutes | 17 September 1995 7:30pm |
Anneka Rice and the team have 52 hours to create and publish a book called 500 Ways on Making You Feel Better. The book contains jokes, games, stories etc. Starting with a visit on the Big Breakfast and with help at the BT Tower.
| 61 | 5 | "County Antrim Meeting Place" | 50 minutes | 24 September 1995 7:30pm |
The community of Corrymeela challenged Anneka to knock down their Tara – meeting house – and replace it with 3 buildings for arts and crafts, dancing and meeting. In the 74 hours it took to complete the challenge, a further 128 smaller challenges were undertaken by local volunteers.
| 62 | 6 | "UK Blood Transfusion Service" | 50 minutes | 1 October 1995 7:30pm |
Anneka was challenged by the UK Blood Transfusion Service to find 100,000 new donors (1 year's supply) in 1 day. 41,000 pledged to give blood on the actual day across the country and 31,000 pledged after the programme aired.
| 63 | 7 | "Birmingham Homeless Mothers Hostel" | 50 minutes | 8 October 1995 7:30pm |
St Basil's Housing Centre in Birmingham challenged Anneka to renovate a disused shop and abattoir transforming it into a 10 bed unit for young homeless mothers and their babies. Over the 58 hours for the challenge, some 16 smaller projects were tackled by volunteers.
| 64 | 8 | "Lion Sanctuary" | 50 minutes | 15 October 1995 7:30pm |
Anneka was challenged to renovate the RSPCA at Grafty Green, Kent as well as rescue two lions based in Athens and transport them to their newly built Big Cat Sanctuary in 61 hours. The challenge was set by the Born Free Foundation.

=== Specials (2006–07) ===
| No. overall | No. in series | Title | Running time | Original release date |
|---|---|---|---|---|
| 65 | – | "Sri Lanka" | 50 minutes | 26 December 2006 8:00pm |
Anneka returns to be challenged to help World Vision to rebuild a maternity clinic, a cricket pavilion and a children's play centre in Sri Lanka after the 2004 Tsunami disaster; all in 5 days.
| 66 | – | "Hospice CD" | 70 minutes | 6 June 2007 9:00pm |
Anneka and the team have 5 days to make a CD of songs from the musicals. It is in aid of the Chase Trust for many disabled and very sick children around the country. The CD must contain 12 songs from artists and a version of Over the Rainbow from the children at the trust. If that wasn't enough, a concert has to be arranged for the children to perform.

=== Series 8 (2023–25) ===
| No. overall | No. in series | Title | Running time | Original release date |
|---|---|---|---|---|
| 67 | 1 | "Foal Farm" | 70 minutes | 18 March 2023 8:50pm |
Anneka and the team have just 3 ½ days to transform a dogs rescue centre in Kent with brand new kennels, a grooming parlour and a play area, all in time for a dog show to reopen the centre.
| 68 | 2 | "Sprouts" | 70 minutes | 25 March 2023 8:30pm |
Anneka comes to the rescue in Stockton, challenged to build a new community food hub with its own cafe, teaching kitchen and food bank. She also has to produce an original community recipe book – all in just 72 hours.
| 69 | 3 | "Age UK" | 70 minutes | 14 May 2023 7:30pm |
Anneka is challenged by Age UK Wirral to create a giant "memory village" for people suffering with dementia; building shops, a cafe and a village green, and throwing an opening party – all in just three days.
| 70 | 4 | "Sea Cadets" | 70 minutes | 5 October 2025 10:30pm |
Anneka and the Challenge team come to the aid of Luton Sea and Royal Marine Cadets to design a medal for outstanding achievement and in 3 days, refurbish their training facilities, including overnight accommodation, training boats and equipment.
