= La Chasse aux trésors =

French-language television game show

- Also known as: La Chasse au trésor
- Genre: Game show
- Created by: Jacques Antoine
- Presented by: Philippe Gildas
- Original language: French
- No. of seasons: 4

Production
- Production companies: Communauté des télévisions francophones; Télé-Union

Original release
- Network: TSR
- Release: 9 January 1981 – 24 October 1984
- Network: Antenne 2
- Release: 15 March 1981 – 2 December 1984
- Network: RTBF1
- Release: 15 March 1981 – 1984
- Network: RTL Télé Luxembourg/RTL Télévision
- Release: 15 March 1981 – 1984
- Network: Radio-Canada TV
- Release: 14 June 1981 – 1984
- Network: TMC
- Release: 1981 – 1984

Related
- Treasure Hunt; A la caza del tesoro

La Chasse au trésor, later La Chasse aux trésors, is a French-language game show created by Jacques Antoine, produced by the Communauté des télévisions francophones and Télé-Union, and broadcast from 1981 to 1984 on TSR in Switzerland, Antenne 2 in France, RTBF1 in Belgium, RTL Télé Luxembourg/RTL Télévision in Luxembourg, Radio-Canada TV in Canada, and TMC in Monaco.

The show spawned two spin-offs Les Trésors du monde and La Carte aux trésors; and several foreign-language versions, such as British Treasure Hunt, Spanish A la caza del tesoro, Italian Caccia al tesoro, German Rätselflug, Dutch Op jacht naar de schat, Portuguese Caça ao Tesouro, and Scandinavian Skattjakten. All the contemporary foreign versions used the same technical equipment as the French original version and the same studio in Paris.

== Premise ==
Presenter greets a pair of contestants at the show's studio in Paris. They are then given a mission: to find three treasures in under 45 minutes in a remote location without leaving the studio. Using the clues they receive and the maps, travel guides, and books available to them, they must give instructions to the skyrunner, who will travel by helicopter to locate the treasures in the remote area. Once they find one of the treasures, they receive the clue for the following one.

Communication with the remote location was carried out with a radio-telephone link via satellite in audio only, since there was no live television connection. The footage filmed in the remote location was added in post-production.

== Versions ==
Country	Local title	Presenters	Channel	Broadcast
Switzerland	La Chasse aux trésors (original format)	Philippe Gildas (1981–1982); Jean Lanzi and Marie-Thérèse Cuny (1982); Didier Lecat and Elsa Manet (1982–1984)	TSR	9 January 1981 – 24 October 1984
France	La Chasse aux trésors (original format)	Philippe Gildas (1981–1982); Jean Lanzi and Marie-Thérèse Cuny (1982); Didier Lecat and Elsa Manet (1982–1984)	Antenne 2	15 March 1981 – 2 December 1984
Belgium	La Chasse aux trésors (original format)	Philippe Gildas (1981–1982); Jean Lanzi and Marie-Thérèse Cuny (1982); Didier Lecat and Elsa Manet (1982–1984)	RTBF1	15 March 1981 – 1984
Luxembourg	La Chasse aux trésors (original format)	Philippe Gildas (1981–1982); Jean Lanzi and Marie-Thérèse Cuny (1982); Didier Lecat and Elsa Manet (1982–1984)	RTL Télé Luxembourg/RTL Télévision	15 March 1981 – 1984
Canada	La Chasse aux trésors (original format)	Philippe Gildas (1981–1982); Jean Lanzi and Marie-Thérèse Cuny (1982); Didier Lecat and Elsa Manet (1982–1984)	Radio-Canada TV	14 June 1981 – 1984
Monaco	La Chasse aux trésors (original format)	Philippe Gildas (1981–1982); Jean Lanzi and Marie-Thérèse Cuny (1982); Didier Lecat and Elsa Manet (1982–1984)	TMC	1981 – 1984
France	Les Trésors du monde	Patrick Chêne and Nathalie Simon	France 2	1994
France	La Carte aux trésors	Sylvain Augier (1996–2005); Marc Bessou (2006); Nathalie Simon (2007–2009)	France 3	6 August 1996 – 31 August 2009
France	La Carte aux trésors	Cyril Féraud (2018–2026); Stéphane Bern (2026–present)	France 3	25 April 2018 – present
Germany	Rätselflug	Rudolf Rohlinger with, in the field, Günther Jauch or Bernhard Russi	Das Erste	22 July 1982 — 3 April 1983
Italy	Caccia al tesoro	Lea Pericoli, Brando Quilici and Jocelyn Hattab	Rai Uno	26 June 1983 — 17 October 1984
Netherlands	Op jacht naar de schat	Leo van der Goot	VOO	30 October 1982 – 1983
Portugal	Caça ao Tesouro	Catarina Furtado	SIC	1994
Spain	A la caza del tesoro	Isabel Tenaille (studio); Miguel de la Quadra-Salcedo (skyrunner)	TVE1	8 January – 13 May 1984
Denmark Norway Sweden	Skattjakt; Skattjakten	Jørgen Schleimann (judge); Knut Bjørnsen (studio); Johan Torén (skyrunner)	DR1; NRK1; TV2	8 September – 30 December 1983
United Kingdom	Treasure Hunt	Kenneth Kendall, with Anneka Rice (1982–1988) and Annabel Croft (1989)	Channel 4	28 December 1982 – 18 May 1989
United Kingdom	Treasure Hunt	Dermot Murnaghan and Suzi Perry	BBC Two	16 December 2002 – 2 August 2003
