= The Crystal Maze =

British game show

- 2016 revival titlecard
- Genre: Game show
- Created by: Jacques Antoine
- Based on: Fort Boyard
- Directed by: David G. Croft (1990–91, 1993–95); Dominic Brigstocke (1991–93); Toby Baker (2016–2020)
- Presented by: Richard O'Brien; Ed Tudor-Pole; Stephen Merchant; Richard Ayoade
- Starring: Sandra Caron; Dennis Price; Maureen Lipman; Adam Buxton; Jessica Hynes
- Theme music composer: Zack Laurence
- Opening theme: "Force Field"
- Ending theme: "Force Field"
- Country of origin: United Kingdom
- Original language: English
- No. of series: 6 (original); 3 (revival)
- No. of episodes: 83 (original; inc. 5 specials); 1 (2016 SU2C special); 45 (revival)

Production
- Producers: Malcolm Heyworth (1990–95); Angela Breheny (1990); David G. Croft (1991–95); Christopher Lore (2017–2020)
- Production locations: Lee International Studios, Shepperton (1990); Aces High Studio, North Weald Airfield (1991–95); The Crystal Maze Live Experience, London (2016); The Bottle Yard Studios, Bristol (2017–2020)
- Running time: 60 minutes (inc. adverts)
- Production companies: Chatsworth Television (1990–95); Fizz (2016-2020); Little Lion Entertainment (2016); Stephen David Entertainment; Bunim/Murray Productions (2017-2020)

Original release
- Network: Channel 4 E4 (2020)
- Release: 15 February 1990 – 10 August 1995
- Release: 16 October 2016
- Release: 23 June 2017 – 31 December 2020

Related
- Jungle Run

The Crystal Maze is a British game show devised by Jacques Antoine, based upon his format for the French game show Fort Boyard, and produced for Channel 4. The programme focuses on teams of contestants, a mixed group of men and women, attempting a range of challenges to earn time required to help them complete one final challenge, which if completed successfully earns them a prize. The premise of the show is themed around challenges set to different periods of human history within a fictional labyrinth of time and space (the titular "Crystal Maze"). It used golf ball-sized Swarovski glass crystals (referred to as "time crystals") as a reward for each challenge successfully completed by contestants, and lock-in conditions for contestants who ran out of time or broke a three-strikes rule on a challenge.

The Crystal Maze originally consisted of six series, including five Christmas specials involving teams of children, which aired between 15 February 1990 to 10 August 1995. The first four series and three specials were hosted by Richard O'Brien, with the remaining two series and specials hosted by Edward Tudor-Pole. In October 2016, Channel 4 created a one-off celebrity edition for Stand Up to Cancer, hosted by Stephen Merchant. In 2017, the broadcaster began airing new episodes of the game, after reviving it following the 2016 special, revamping its format and creating several standard episodes along additional celebrity specials, and appointing Richard Ayoade as host. This run was cancelled due to the COVID-19 pandemic after three series with the final episodes airing in 2020.

A 10-episode American version of the show, filmed on the same set as the UK version, aired on Nickelodeon in 2020.

In March 2016, The Crystal Maze Live Experience opened, allowing the public to buy tickets and compete in a replica of the game show's zones and challenges.

== Creation ==
The Crystal Maze's origins can be traced to an attempt to create an edition of Fort Boyard for British television, commissioned by Channel 4 in 1989 from Chatsworth Television. Complications in creating a pilot arose due to the fortress used by the TV game show, situated off the west coast of France, being unavailable for filming due to its ongoing refurbishments that year. As a result, the pilot was filmed in London at Elstree Studios, using a basic replica set funded by Channel 4, but the result was deemed unsuccessful and not broadcast, due to the considerable changes required to the French-owned format in order for it to suit a UK audience. Channel 5 later bought the rights and made its own British version of Fort Boyard, using the now refurbished set, which aired for four series from 1998 to 2001.

In order to create a more successful format for Channel 4, which had commissioned a full series, Chatsworth Television producer Malcolm Heyworth contacted Fort Boyard's creator Jacques Antoine – who attended the pilot's creation, and who had created the company's other productions: Treasure Hunt, and Interceptor – and proposed creating an alternative format which conducted challenges within themed zones. Antoine eventually provided a rough sketch to the producers when taking them to Paris to view a full-size Crystal Dome created by the French, revealing it would be the centrepiece and surrounded by four other sets. The sketch was used as inspiration for the concept of The Crystal Maze, which was developed in just "two days", creating a show which although was similar to Fort Boyard, had substantial differences in presentation and style, creating a show akin to Dungeons & Dragons, with the host acting as the Dungeon Master.

== Format ==
Each team that competes on The Crystal Maze undertake a series of challenges (referred to as games). Teams begin at a pre-determined zone, whereupon they compete in a finite number of games in each zone, accruing as many time crystals as they can before travelling to the large "Crystal Dome" at the centre of the maze to meet their final challenge. Upon entering a game's cell, the objective is usually determined by either a clear written message or cryptic clue. The remainder of the team watch their progress either through a cell's windows or monitors depending on the zone aesthetic, and may give advice to the contestant unless stipulated otherwise. The host will serve reminders of the time limit and of any special rules, and generally will not give hints unless the contestant is struggling badly.

Each game falls under one of four categories:

List of The Crystal Maze categories
Category	Description
Mental	Mental and memory skill ranging from simple brainteasers, to acute memory and 2D/3D puzzles.
Mystery	Testing a contestant's problem solving abilities ranging from treasure hunts to large-scale mazes.
Physical	Testing a contestant's physical abilities ranging from obstacle courses, to lifting, using, cranking or manipulating objects.
Skill	Testing a contestant's dexterity, accuracy and hand–eye coordination ranging from target-shooting, timing tests, to vehicle driving.

Each game presents the potential of being locked within a game's cell. If locked in, the contestant is unable to take any further part in proceedings and will be eliminated. If the team's captain is locked in, the vice-captain takes over and may select a new vice-captain to replace them and so on. Reduction in team members poses an increased difficulty for future games and at their final challenge, so some teams may leave contestants behind if that secures more time in the Dome.

There are two ways a lock-in can occur in The Crystal Maze: if a contestant exceeds their time limit within the cell, or an "automatic lock-in" where they breach a game's special rules or restrictions, irrespective of their progress in obtaining the crystal. This is outlined prior to a contestant entering the cell by the Maze Master.

Once the team arrives at the Crystal Dome, they are told how much time that they have to complete the final challenge, based on the number of crystals they have brought with them (five seconds for each crystal they had at the end of the game). At this point, the team enter the Dome, and upon the challenge beginning, they must collect as many gold foil tokens as they can and deposit them into a container along a wall of the Dome, while avoiding any silver tokens mixed in with them; these are blown about by fans beneath the floor of the Dome. Once time is up, the fans are switched off and no more tokens can be deposited into the container; a slot is opened during the challenge, which closes up when the time is up. Once the team is outside the dome, they, along with any members who were not present for the final challenge, are given the tally of their efforts by the host. If the team accumulate a total of 100 gold tokens or more, after deduction of any silver tokens, the team wins the grand prize that they chose for themselves before partaking in the show. All contestants who participate in the show win a commemorative crystal saying "I Cracked the Crystal Maze", which acts as a consolation prize if a team fails to secure the required number of gold tokens.

=== Original series ===
During the run of the original series between 1990 and 1995, teams consisted of three men and three women, each aged between 16 and 40, who were put together by the production team and did not know each other before appearing on the show From their pre-determined starting zone, teams either travelled clockwise or counter-clockwise around the maze, engaging in at least three games in each zone, sometimes being given the opportunity to play a fourth game in a zone during their trip around the maze. Between the first and fourth series, the total number of games that could be played varied between 14 and 16 per episode, but for the fifth and sixth series, the number of games played was reduced to a standard of 13. Throughout the run, 3D maps of varying sophistication were used to highlight where the host and team were. Until the end of the third series, each contestant on the team could win a prize for themselves that they chose at a later date (a selection of the available prizes would be read out as if that was theirs but the allocation was sometimes in-jokes based on things that happened during the recording), if the team succeeded at collecting 100 or more gold tokens, but from the fourth series, this format was changed to the team choosing a prize that they shared together if they won the final challenge. During the first series, a runner-up prize could also be chosen by each member of a team, which they won if the final tally of tokens was between 50 and 99, but this format was dropped by the start of the second series.

During the Christmas specials, the teams consisted of similar setup, with each aged between 10 and 15, and selected by the production team. While the format was similar to the adult version, there were notable differences, such as easier games with fewer chances of a lock-in, more lenient time limits and additional clues from the host. The prize would always be awarded at the end, irrespective of achievement.

=== Revived series ===
Following the one-off Stand Up to Cancer edition, Channel 4 revived the show featuring the original setup of zones, the same map design from the SU2C special, and a newly designed taller set. The format of the show was revamped to have five contestants who have a prior connection (family, colleagues, etc.) and a reduction in games to ten. Additionally, the team no longer selected the category of game they wanted to play: instead, this was determined for them by the Maze Master.

In a similar vein to the 2016 SU2C special, a series of celebrity episodes was initially broadcast. The contestants taking part were given an extra crystal upon reaching the Dome (or by completing an additional task during the show) to add to those that they had brought, and would earn cash for Stand Up to Cancer depending on how many gold tokens they got, after deduction of silver. Contestants earn £5,000 for less than 50 gold tokens, £10,000 for 50 to 99 tokens, and £20,000 for 100 or more tokens.

The 2019 series introduces the "Mega Crystal", a noticeably larger version of the Crystals within the Maze. The team has one opportunity to earn the Mega Crystal, and the team captain decides before each game whether they want that game to be played for the Mega Crystal. If the team earns the Mega Crystal, it grants them ten seconds of time (instead of the standard five) in the Crystal Dome.

== Hosts ==
Throughout its history, The Crystal Maze has been presented by a series of hosts known as Maze Masters. Each takes on the role of the Maze's custodian responsible for guiding each team around the various zones, keeping them updated on their progress, leading each nominated team member to the respective games, acting as the timekeeper on all games and the final challenge at the Dome, and taking safe custody of each crystal won by the team.

The short monologue to camera scenes originated when O'Brien began joking with the cameramen during filming of an episode. When the production team reviewed the footage and realised what it could bring to the show they "asked him to do it all the time"; O'Brien felt that looking straight at the camera "unknowingly added a complicity between me and the audience at home". However, he also "often appeared detached from proceedings, bordering on deadpan". Each successive host has continued these monologues, adding their own variant to the show.

List of The Crystal Maze hosts
Channel 4 series
Name	Active	Notes
Richard O'Brien	1990–1993	The first host, O'Brien often wore a long fur coat, paired with a brightly coloured shirt, skinny-fit trousers, a shaved head and long, sleek leather boots, and brought to the show a unique style of presenting, displaying an "infectious... enthusiasm and manic energy" to his role. He was always broadly welcoming and encouraging to teams, being congratulatory on their successes, but would show visible frustration with a contestant for a particularly sub-standard attempt at a game, and would encourage them to use their allotted time effectively. O'Brien would produce a harmonica from his pocket during a game, and played one short and repetitive tune which he called "excitement music". On a number of occasions, he would 'find' other musical instruments in the maze, which were used to showcase his talents, even occasionally breaking into song. O'Brien would often comment that he built the games and would adapt them for future teams if a game was beaten quickly. At the start of the series five Christmas special, O'Brien departed the series to start a new life in California with Mumsie.
Ed Tudor-Pole	1993–1995	The second host, Tudor-Pole, wore an elaborate waistcoat and tunic, off-white sleeves and trousers, and long black boots, in a similar style to his predecessor, with his look having been described as Georgian. While his style of hosting had the similar energetic style to O'Brien's, it was less detached, with Tudor-Pole being more sympathetic towards contestants, and often talking up the 'time travel' elements of the show, with the inclusion of nonsense words, such as "trignification" to describe the process of travelling between time zones, providing fictitious backstories of each zone while often referring to unseen companions in the maze, such as his horse "Bert" in Medieval Zone, and "Starbuck", a deranged cat, who lives in Ocean Zone. According to h2g2, "pale and looking a little emaciated, Ed Tudor-Pole gave The Crystal Maze a dark and intimidating feeling".
Stephen Merchant	2016	The third host, appearing in a one-off edition for Stand Up to Cancer in 2016. Merchant wore a blue dress suit, red waistcoat and white shirt with a floral neckerchief. His style of presentation involved quirky jokes about real-life events and a cheerful demeanor with the contestants. Merchant was asked to reprise his role when a full series was commissioned, but turned it down due to other commitments.
Richard Ayoade	2017–2020	The fourth host, Ayoade was dressed in a smart, colourful suit, wearing his trademark glasses and carrying "The Hand", a wooden effigy of a hand on the end of a stick which changes based on whether the contestants are members of the general public or celebrities. His style of presenting was described as being "a more cerebral and intense version" of his The IT Crowd character, Maurice Moss, using acronyms such as "ALIS" ("Automatic Lock-In Situation", for automatic lock-in games), and being aware that the show was entirely fictitious, with jokes being at the expense of the production values and editing of contestants when wearing safety gear. Ayoade would frequently refer to contestants by their initials, colour jumpsuit (e.g. yellow Katie) or coin a nickname based on their performance in the Maze.
Nickelodeon series
Name	Active	Notes
Adam Conover	2020	The host of the American version, Conover wore a tailor-made suit with a brooch on his left lapel. In the show, Conover described his role as an "ageless trickster spirit" who actively encouraged teams, and was inquisitive about their lives before entering the Maze. Conover additionally used terminology introduced by Ayoade, especially the "ALIS" acronym. Throughout the show, Conover told the audience and teams a combination of real and fictitious tales of events that happened in each zone similar to his role on Adam Ruins Everything.

=== Other characters ===
Whilst the Maze is home to the Maze Master, several original characters have appeared whether as part of a particular game such as a jailor, guard and tribal priest, or are otherwise fictionalised within a respective zone. None of the characters appear in the American version. Notable characters include:

- Mumsie and Auntie Sabrina: Portrayed by Sandra Caron, Mumsie is a genial fortune teller during O'Brien's tenure, hosting a recurring mental game in the Medieval Zone that involved brain teaser questions; Caron portrayed Mumsie for the first, second and fourth series of the original run, and Auntie Sabrina for the third series, who was described by O'Brien as taking over while his Mumsie was away. Both characters were portrayed as friendly to the contestants, with Mumsie sometimes being overly motherly with O'Brien, and often talked about her affair she was having with a man called "Ralph" to both the contestants and audience during the first and second series, showing disapproval of her next affair with man called "Dwayne" during the fourth series. Mumsie departed with O'Brien at the start of the fifth series. In The Crystal Maze Live Experience, Mumsie is an unseen character which the Maze Master communicates with through an earpiece.
- The Computer: An operating system for the Futuristic Zone is situated within; if the team's starting point is this zone, the computer provides a question for the team that they must answer correctly to gain entry into the Maze. During O'Brien's tenure (with the exception of series 2), the computer had a male voice and usually acted antagonistically towards him. During Tudor-Pole's tenure, the computer adopted a female voice and was named Barbara. In Ayoade's tenure, the computer retains a female voice but no other personality traits are shown, only speaking when a team seeks entry to the maze. O'Brien portrayed the computer during the Stand up to Cancer special.
- The Riddle Master: Portrayed by Adam Buxton, the Riddle Master, credited as Jarhead, is a head that resides in a glass jar who creates Crystals by mixing potions using telekinesis when a contestant completes his game. Though residing in a jar in the Futuristic and Medieval zones, his jar is replaced with a bird cage in the Eastern zone. He has a friendly, though seemingly subservient, relationship to Ayoade.
- Knight Marion: (Note: In the episode "The Ali Family", the Knight introduces herself as Marion in the Medieval zone.) Portrayed by Jessica Hynes, Marion is a King's Knight and guard of the Medieval Zone who wears oversized battle armour, carries a large sword, and grants entry. She was known to ask Ayoade to attend events with her, which he rebuffed. When Medieval was replaced with Eastern, she did not return.

== Filming ==
Each episode had a budget of £125,000 and was filmed over a period of two days at the show's studio. During the first day of shooting, the team, followed by multiple cameras, tackle all the games and discover their fate in the crystal dome in the style of a "live" shoot. The close up of contestants, leaping and grabbing tokens was usually recorded while the actual collection was being counted, actual collection of tokens was normally done on hands and knees as the token settled round the sides of the dome. The following day then focuses on acquiring close-up shots of gameplay with a single camera, requiring team members to return to games they had already won or lost (second day shots can be identified by the lack of clip-on lapel microphones on contestants). An entire series requires about five weeks to be filmed, with three episodes produced per week. Each series of the show featured its own portfolio of games: 37 different game designs in series 1, and between 41 and 49 games in each subsequent series.

=== The set ===
Every episode, with the exception of the 2016 special, is filmed on a very large custom built set. The set, designed by James Dillon for both the original run and the revived series, is divided into five parts, four of which are named as zones, set in different periods of time and space, which house the games that contestants take on, while the final part, called the Crystal Dome, houses the final challenge that the team tackle together towards the end of the episode. The theme of each zone is not only reflected via its time period, but also in the time-keeping devices, the design of the games, and how the host and team entered and moves between the zones. As of 2019, six zones have been used within the Maze.

=== Zones ===
Zone	Appearances	Description	Method of timekeeping
Aztec	1990–1995; 2016–2020	An ancient Aztec village amidst ruins, with carved pillars, sand, various plants and a sky backdrop; whilst the zone is typically shown during daytime, the original series depicted the zone through different periods of the day (sunset, night, etc.), with night-time variants often seen if Aztec was the last zone to be played. Entry to the zone was originally via rowing along a river; the revived series involved moving large boulders blocking the entrance. Exiting in the original series was either a tunnel leading off towards Industrial/Ocean, and a set of steps to a ledge heading towards Futuristic, though in the revived series the latter is implemented for all zone transitions. The revived series removed the river, replaced with a small waterfall feature.	Water clocks
Industrial	1990–1992; 2016–2020	A present-day chemical plant with metal barrels, warning signs, a bubbling chemical pool, corrugated roofing and panelling; cells had metal doors with bar handles, with some having office-like interiors. The zone was used for three series in the original run, with teams able to watch their nominated member's efforts in a game via one of a number of monitors used in the zone. Industrial was brought back for the revived series, maintaining the same design style as the original, though with teams able to watch proceedings in a game via either monitors or panels that opened into a cell. Entry into this zone was initially designed towards finding a key to unlock a chain-mesh gate, but later changed towards finding a way over it and around a number of small obstacles, with stairs leading to an upper floor passage towards Medieval, and a pipeline tunnel towards Aztec. In the American version of the show, Industrial is green on the map.	Analogue clock
Futuristic	1990–1995 (Note: In series 1-3, the Futuristic zone was coloured blue on the 3D map, and changed to gray from series 4–6 when the Ocean zone was introduced.)	Designed as a space station, orbiting an unknown planet in the distant future. Futuristic was designed as run down, with metal sliding doors, exposed wiring, viewpoints that looked out into space with monitors spread over the station to view inside the cells, and cell doors having a keypad next to them which the host punched a code into, to allow access. Entry was designed around an airlock setup, with a computer panel the host used to boot up the station's computer and request a question for the team, with a passage leading off towards Medieval, and a lift that allowed the host and team to shift between a walkway and a ledge connecting to Aztec.	Digital clock
Futuristic	2016–2020	For the revival, the station was clean and sleek, with a central console for contestants to view games set on rotating floor with three corridors that housed the games with the cell doors no longer requiring an access code. Entry and exit to the zone was via an airlock similar to the original series, with entry determined by answering a question by the computer (if Futuristic was the starting zone) and exiting was by the same method by stepping on a 'teleporter pad' to traverse between zones.	Digital clock
Medieval	1990–1995; 2016–2018	This was designed as a castle of the Middle Ages, laden with a straw covered flagstone floor, wooden barrels, and a large dining table with solid wooden chairs. The area is lit with flaming torches and candles. The zone's cells have sturdy oak doors with slide locks on, barred windows to look in. This zone was referred within the show as the homestead of the Maze Master. Entry into this zone was initially done by contestants raising the portcullis at the castle's entrance by finding the right chain, and then later having to climb over it. In the revived series, this method was changed to simply answering a riddle to open a portcullis. The zone was designed with a passage that led to Futuristic via a beam that had to be crossed, and a set of stairs that had to be crossed to get to Industrial/Ocean, later this was changed to a set of ledges that had to be traversed. Medieval was later replaced with Eastern in the 2019 series.	Hourglasses
Ocean	1993–1995	A replacement to the Industrial zone from 1993 to 1995, this zone was designed as a sunken ship called the SS Atlantis, held within an air bubble at the bottom of the ocean, and consisted of a saloon with an elegant staircase, wooden panelling, couches, a grand piano, covered furniture and objects and upper walkway, a boiler room, and maintenance corridors, with cells designed as either maintenance rooms, the interior of one of the ship's boilers, or refined cabins. Entry was designed around climbing down from the bridge into the boiler room via a rope ladder, with a hatchway at the top of a ladder leading to Medieval, and a ventilation shaft leading towards Aztec.	Analogue clock
Eastern	2019–2020	Themed around the architecture and iconography of East Asia with a lily pond, ornate vases, lanterns, and solid colors throughout. Entry was outside a garden surrounded with cherry blossom trees which took contestants down a small ramp into the center of the zone. Teams were able to watch proceedings in a game by drawing back curtains in the cell or a circular hatch on the cell door. Exiting the zone was via jumping across oversized lily pads.	Pendulum clock
Crystal Dome	1990–1995; 2016–2020	A 16-foot (4.9 m) model for the show's time crystals, located in the centre of the Maze. The interior is designed with rails for the team to hold onto before the final challenge begins, with a mesh floor and a series of fans below the base which activate on the host's command, blowing foil tokens around. The exterior differs between the original run, one-off special and revived series, but always provided the host with a small hexagonal podium designed to hold the team's acquired crystals. Each crystal is illuminated from below by lights which are deactivated sequentially at intervals of five seconds, serving as a countdown. The challenge is over when all crystals are dark. In the original series, the Dome featured an encircling moat with the podium having two switches with which the host controlled a moat bridge and door to the Dome. For the revived series, the moat and switches were retired and the Dome redesigned to feature a set of flashing lights (Red to cease collecting tokens, Gold for achieving the top prize, etc.) and each crystal turned red to represent how much time has elapsed. The opening scene of each episode often comprised a greeting from the host from in front of the dome with tokens flying within.	Time crystals

=== Location ===
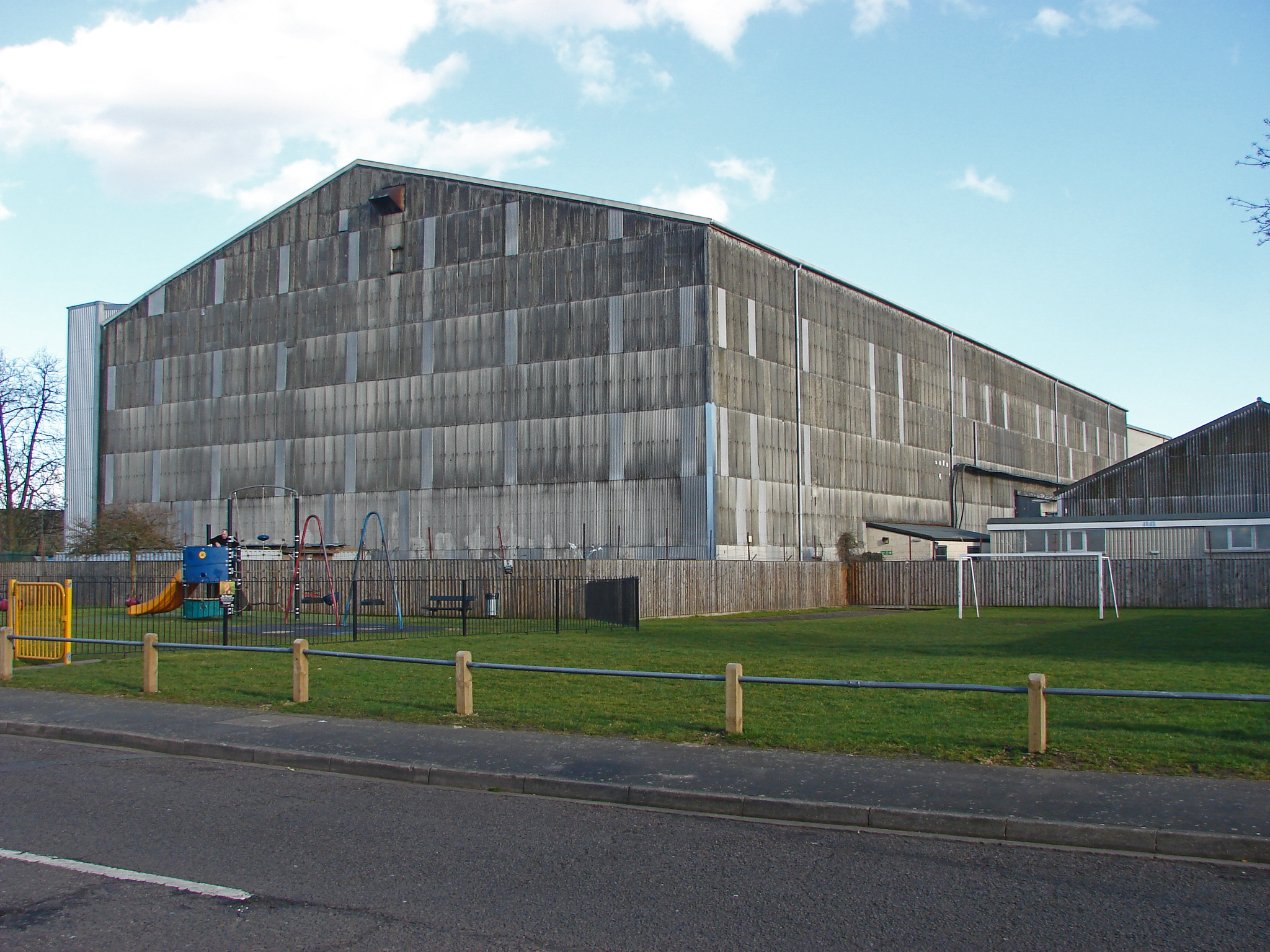
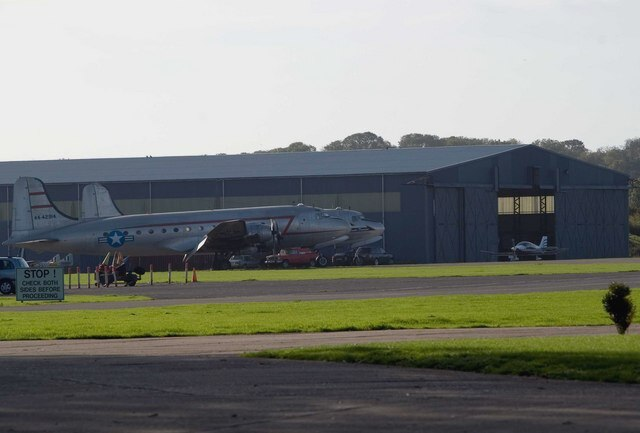
Filming locations used in the 1990s; H Stage at Shepperton Studios and Aces High Studios.

For the first series, the show was filmed at Shepperton Studios, within a stage set measuring 30,000-square-foot (2,800 m^{2}) and containing a water tank on-site. After the first series, the production team decided to expand the maze, relocating the set to an adapted aircraft hangar, Hangar 6, operated by Aces High Studios at North Weald Airfield in Essex. After the show ended in 1995, when Channel 4's contract with producers Chatsworth TV expired, the set was eventually dismantled. Costing in the region of £250,000 to build, it was, at the time, the largest TV set in Europe and holds the Guinness World Records title for the largest game show set in television history.

When the broadcaster decided to make a one-off edition of the show for Stand Up for Cancer in 2016, the episode was filmed at The Crystal Maze live immersive experience in London, as it was no longer possible to use the original set. When Channel 4 made the decision to revive the show for a full series in November 2016, James Dillon was asked to design a new set at a 30,000-square-foot (2,800 m^{2}) warehouse at The Bottle Yard Studios in Bristol. Dillon went back to his original plans and sketches but took the opportunity to build and expand on several of his original ideas and concepts. The most drastic change is that the Crystal Dome is actually located in a separate part of the studio; originally its proximity to the Aztec zone caused a problem with sand contaminating the Dome area.

=== Theme tune ===
The theme tune for The Crystal Maze was composed by Zack Laurence and is entitled "Force Field". It was used through all six original series, with an updated version being used for the new series. The original track is one minute and five seconds long; however it was shortened for the opening and ending titles. Likewise, the new re-recorded version of the theme lasts for 33 seconds. The "Underscore" remix of the theme tune played during the show itself was also composed by Laurence.

== Reception ==
At its height, viewing figures regularly scored over 4 million, peaking at 5.9 million in 1992 when the show was nominated for its first BAFTA award. Three other BAFTA nominations followed in subsequent years with a Royal Television Society award nomination in 1995. Although not originally envisioned as a children's show over 40% of the show's viewers were under 16, a surprise to the crew and O'Brien, who adapted his performance accordingly, forcing himself to think more like a child. Contemporary commentary has often suggested that this aspect of O'Brien's performance was the show's biggest attraction. Praising his zany style and describing him as "a fearless adventurer with a wink and a smile and a verbal knife in the back of those poor saps [contestants] ... His style and wit was sardonic, yet never exclusionary, and pointed, yet never bitter". In 2012 The Guardian's TV & Radio Blog listed O'Brien as one of the six "most loved" game show hosts, describing him as "an unconventional choice for an unconventional series ... [who] looked more like a dandy gazelle than a game show host". The same commentary has also suggested Tudor-Pole had an almost impossible task in living up to O'Brien's popularity. The Guardian claimed "It was no surprise that the show went downhill after [O'Brien's] exit."

The show has had a lasting impact and influence on British television, becoming what has been described as a cult classic due to repeats; the makers of the children's TV show Jungle Run openly acknowledge The Crystal Maze as an influence, particularly the final host, Michael Underwood, who was the team captain in the first Christmas special; The perceived stupidity of the contestants was the target of various British comedy shows and spoofs, a trend which continued well into the mid 2000s.

== Merchandise ==
=== Home Entertainment ===
A single-player computer game based on The Crystal Maze was developed by Digital Jellyfish Design and released in 1993. A game for mobiles was released in 2008, and later for iOS in 2010.

In 1991, MB Games released a board game loosely based upon the show. The concept of the game differed significantly from the show with players competing against each other as opposed to the co-operative style of the TV show.

For the revived series, Rascals Products Limited produced a new board game. The game itself features sixteen challenges which can be played either individually or as a team, with an optional timer to use on smartphones and tablets. In 2019, an expansion for the Eastern zone was released which can replace any existing zone on the main board and comes with four new games.

=== The Crystal Maze Live Experience ===
In June 2015, the interactive theatre production company Little Lion Entertainment announced that a "live immersive experience" of The Crystal Maze would be taking place in late 2015, funded successfully through an Indiegogo crowdfunding campaign. Located in central London, the Live Experience admits members of the public, who can buy tickets and play the show for themselves. In the Live Experience, Richard O'Brien is shown leaving the Maze to "the new custodian" who guides the team. In the London experience, four teams enter the maze at separate locations, and rotate around the four zones simultaneously before competing against each other in The Crystal Dome. In the Manchester experience, the zones are split in two parts, and the teams move through the maze one after the other, such that each half-zone always has one team in it. Like the London Maze, teams compete for the high score in the Crystal Dome, by collecting as many gold tokens as possible, but unlike in London, the teams never meet or compete against one another. The group secured a venue for the Maze in the King's Cross area in late 2015, and it opened for contestants on 15 March 2016. In November 2016, another live experience in Manchester at the Granada Studios opened to the public in April 2017. In January 2026, the London maze premiered the Ocean zone.

=== The Cyberdrome Crystal Maze ===
The Cyberdrome Crystal Maze was an attraction usually found in bowling alleys and video arcades in the UK. It allowed entrants an opportunity to play the Crystal Maze in a computerised format. As this feature lacked a host, rules regarding lock ins were changed. The locations of the Cyberdromes were Blackpool, Pembrokeshire, Southampton, Coventry, and Maidenhead with additional locations in Japan and Dubai. Only the Dubai location is still open, the Pembrokeshire location having closed in 2010.

=== Quiz machines ===
Chatsworth Television licensed a number of popular SWP quiz machines based on the TV series. In 2009, Cool Games created a 3D video version for the UK SWP market.

=== Literature ===
Release name	UK release date	Author	Publisher	Notes	Ref
The Crystal Maze	15 February 1990	Peter Arnold and Gill Brown	Time Warner; Paperbacks	Re-released; 1 October 1990	
Crystal Maze Adventure Gamebook	7 February 1991	Dave Morris and Jamie Thomson	Mammoth	New edition	
Crystal Maze Challenge!	21 May 1992	Dave Morris and Jamie Thomson	Mammoth	1st Edition; 21 May 1992	
The Crystal Thief	15 April 1993	Peter Arnold	Mammoth	Puzzle Books	
Tea at Rick's	15 April 1993	Peter Arnold	Mammoth	Puzzle Books	
The Sacred Necklace	16 December 1993	Peter Arnold	Mammoth, London	Puzzle Book	
Phantom in the Tower	16 December 1993	Peter Arnold	Mammoth, London	Puzzle Book	
The Crystal Maze	1994	Unknown	Mammoth		
Crystal Maze Mystery Pack	25 February 1994	Peter Arnold	Heinemann Library		
The Crystal Maze Puzzle Book	13 June 1994	Peter Arnold	Mammoth		
The Crystal Maze Puzzle Book: Bk.2	30 October 1995	Peter Arnold	Mammoth	Puzzle Book	
Crystal Maze A1 Poster	13 June 1996	None	Mammoth	Hardcover	
The Crystal Maze Challenge: Let the Games Begin!	19 August 2017	Neale Simpson	Headline	Hardcover	

=== VHS releases ===
In 1994, a video cassette, The Best of The Crystal Maze was released by Wienerworld Presentation. The video included three episodes: the 1992 and 1993 Christmas specials, and an episode from Series 4. It also featured the clip of O'Brien and Mumsey leaving the maze.

Release name	UK release date
The Best of Crystal Maze	16 May 1994

== Transmissions ==
=== Original ===
Series
Series	Start date	End date	Episodes	Presenter
1	15 February 1990	10 May 1990	13	Richard O'Brien
2	21 March 1991	13 June 1991	13	Richard O'Brien
3	23 April 1992	16 July 1992	13	Richard O'Brien
4	1 April 1993	24 June 1993	13	Richard O'Brien
5	12 May 1994	4 August 1994	13	Ed Tudor-Pole
6	18 May 1995	10 August 1995	13	Ed Tudor-Pole

Christmas specials
Air date	Presenter
1 January 1991	Richard O'Brien
24 December 1991	Richard O'Brien
27 December 1992	Richard O'Brien
24 December 1993	Ed Tudor-Pole
24 December 1994	Ed Tudor-Pole

=== Revival ===
Stand Up to Cancer special
Air date	Presenter
16 October 2016	Stephen Merchant

Series
Series	Start date	End date	Episodes	Editions	Presenter
1	23 June 2017	13 July 2017	20	Celebrities	Richard Ayoade
1	25 August 2017	13 October 2017	20	General Public	Richard Ayoade
1	14 December 2017		20	Christmas	Richard Ayoade
1	15 April 2018	6 May 2018	20	General Public	Richard Ayoade
1	15 November 2020	29 November 2020	20	General Public	Richard Ayoade
2	8 June 2018	6 July 2018	12	Celebrities	Richard Ayoade
2	20 July 2018	24 August 2018	12	General Public	Richard Ayoade
2	26 December 2018		12	Christmas	Richard Ayoade
3	21 June 2019	26 July 2019	13	Celebrities	Richard Ayoade
3	23 December 2019		13	Christmas	Richard Ayoade
3	3 December 2020	31 December 2020	13	Celebrities	Richard Ayoade

== International versions ==
=== United States ===
On 3 June 2019, it was announced that an American version of the show would premiere on Nickelodeon and feature family members competing for $25,000. The ten-episode season was filmed in the same location as the British edition. In December 2019, it was announced that comedian Adam Conover would be the Maze Master for this version. It debuted on the North American version of the channel with a commercial-free premiere which aired on 24 January 2020 and was later broadcast in the UK from 4 September 2020.

In the American adaptation, each team played a total of eight games in the maze (two per zone). The Mega Crystal introduced in 2019 in the original series was available in any game after the first. If a team finished the Crystal Dome with a positive total of gold tokens, they won $100 per gold after deductions for silver tokens, and the full $25,000 for a net result of 100 gold tokens or more.

==== Episodes ====
No.	Title	Original release date	Prod. code	U.S. viewers (millions)
1	"The Walls are Closing In!"	24 January 2020	101	0.69
2	"Swing It Like a Boss!"	31 January 2020	107	0.50
3	"That's Gonna Leave a Mark"	7 February 2020	104	0.47
4	"The Foggy Abyss of Doom"	14 February 2020	102	0.59
5	"What's the Sign for Winning?"	21 February 2020	110	0.70
6	"Keep Your Eyes on the Panda!"	28 February 2020	106	0.52
7	"I Can Read but I Can't Do That"	6 March 2020	105	0.50
8	"Show the Maze Who's Boss"	13 March 2020	109	0.46
9	"Space is a Difficult Place"	20 March 2020	108	0.56
10	"Put a Ring on It!"	27 March 2020	103	0.52
