= Jacques Antoine =

French game show creator and producer (1924–2012)

- Born: 14 March 1924; Neuilly-sur-Seine, France
- Died: 14 September 2012 (aged 88); Paris, France

Jacques Antoine (14 March 1924 – 14 September 2012) was a French creator and producer of game shows. His most famous creations include Treasure Hunt, Interceptor, Fort Boyard, and The Crystal Maze.

== Personal life ==
Jacques Antoine was born 14 March 1924 in Neuilly-sur-Seine, a suburb to the west of Paris. His father was writer and director André-Paul Antoine, and his grandfather was theatre director André Antoine.

== Career ==
At the age of 24, Jacques Antoine made his first steps in radio with Pierre Bellemare. From the 1950s to 1990s, he created and produced many programs, including more than 150 television and radio games among the most famous in French-speaking countries, such as La Tête et les Jambes, Le Schmilblick, Les Jeux de 20 heures, La Chasse aux trésors, L'Académie des neuf, Tournez manège, and Fort Boyard.

== Death and legacy ==
Antoine died on 14 September 2012 of cardiac arrest.

The French host of Fort Boyard Olivier Minne announced on Twitter "Jacques Antoine has left us. The father of Fort Boyard was the greatest TV game creator. I'm very sad. Thinking of him."

Rémy Pflimlin, president of France Télévisions spoke of him as "one of the iconic group who contributed to the creation and production of the first televised games".

TV host Pierre Bellemare described Jacques as "the most innovative man we have had in this profession since the war".

== Credits ==
1. À pied, à cheval et en voiture (1957) (screenplay) (story)
2. Yeux de l'amour, Les (1959) (novel "Une Histoire Vraie")
3. Vache et le prisonnier, La (1959) (story "Histoire Vraie")
4. Mouche (1968) (director)
5. "Treasure Hunt" (1 episode, 1982)
6. "Interceptor" (1989) TV series (deviser)
7. "The Crystal Maze" (1990) TV series (writer)
8. "Fort Boyard" (1990) TV series (unknown episodes)
9. "Carte aux trésors, La" (1996) TV series (idea) (episode "La Chasse au trésor") (uncredited)
10. "Fort Boyard" (1998) TV series (unknown episodes)
11. "Treasure Hunt" (2002) TV series (unknown episodes)
