= Pierre Bellemare =

French writer, radio and TV personality, producer, director and actor

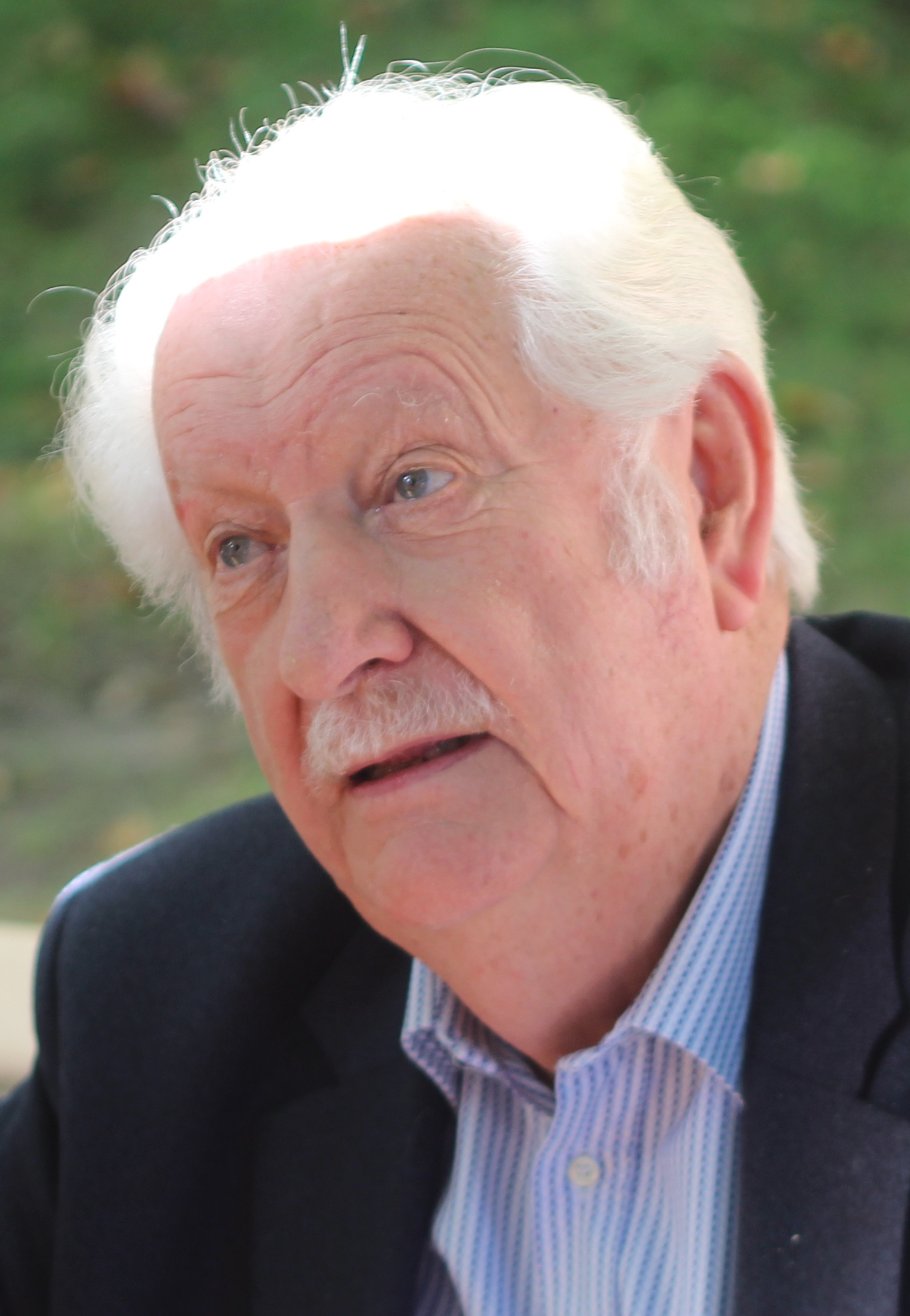
- Pierre Bellemare in 2014
- Born: 21 October 1929; Boulogne-Billancourt, France
- Died: 26 May 2018 (aged 88); Suresnes, France
- Resting place: Père-Lachaise Cemetery
- Occupations: Writer, Television host
- Children: 1

Pierre Bellemare (21 October 1929 – 26 May 2018) was a French writer, novelist, radio personality, television presenter, TV producer, director, and actor.

== Television ==
- La Tête et les Jambes
- La Caméra invisible
- J'ai un Secret : (26 September 1982 – 18 December 1983)
- Les Grosses Têtes : (February 1990 – March 1996)
- Le Bigdil : (2 February 1998 – 23 July 2004) – Anthony, the bison
- Drôle de jeu : (March 1998 – June 1999) – Anthony, the bison
- Crésus : (4 July 2005 – 1 September 2006) – mister Ghost
- En toutes lettres : (September 2009 – June 2011) – the animator with Julien Courbet.

=== Bibliography ===
- DAVID, Jean-Marie. "Bellemare, Pierre". In Dictionnaire des littératures policières (vol. 1, A-I), under the direction of Claude Mesplède. Nantes : Joseph K., nov. 2007, p. 197. (Temps noir). ISBN 978-2-910686-44-4

== Filmography ==
Year	Title	Role	Director	Notes
1959	Match contre la mort	The host	Claude Bernard-Aubert	
1964	Cherchez l'idole	Himself	Michel Boisrond	
1978	De mémoire d'homme	Narrator	Maurice Frydland, Jacques Ertaud	TV series (2 episodes)
1996	Three Lives and Only One Death	Radio Narrator	Raúl Ruiz	
2000	Happenstance	Taxi Driver	Laurent Firode	
2005	Les histoires extraordinaires de Pierre Bellemare	Narrator	Jean-Philippe Amar, Dimitri Grimblat, Véronique Berthoneau, Anne Bernard	TV series (14 episodes)
2005	Dernier cri	Max Pardy	Grégory Morin	Short
2006	Trois jeunes filles nues		Richard Valverde	TV movie
2007	Trois contes merveilleux	Narrator	Hélène Guétary	TV movie
2009	OSS 117: Lost in Rio	Lesignac	Michel Hazanavicius	
2011	Les Tuche	The mayor	Olivier Baroux	
2015	Plus belle la vie	Himself		

== Honours and awards ==
- Knight of the Order of Agricultural Merit
- Knight of the Ordre du Mérite Maritime

== Radio ==
- Since 2013 : Les pieds dans le plat on Europe 1
