= Treasure Hunt (British game show) =

British game show

- Title logo from Series 4 (1986).
- Created by: Jacques Antoine
- Based on: La Chasse aux trésors
- Presented by: Kenneth Kendall (1982–89); Dermot Murnaghan (2002–03)
- Starring: Anneka Rice (1982–88); Annabel Croft (1989); Suzi Perry (2002–03)
- Country of origin: United Kingdom
- Original language: English
- No. of series: 7 (original); 2 (revival)
- No. of episodes: 91 (original: inc. 4 specials); 15 (revival)

Production
- Running time: 60 minutes (inc. adverts)
- Production company: Chatsworth Television

Original release
- Network: Channel 4
- Release: 28 December 1982 – 18 May 1989
- Network: BBC Two
- Release: 16 December 2002 – 2 August 2003

Related
- A la caza del tesoro

Treasure Hunt is a UK game show, based on the format of the French show La Chasse aux trésors, created by Jacques Antoine. It appeared on Channel 4 between 28 December 1982 and 18 May 1989 and was revived by BBC Two between 16 December 2002 and 2 August 2003.

== Presenters and crew ==
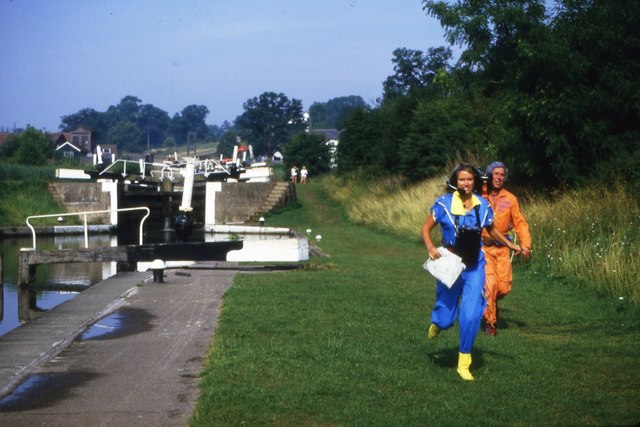
Anneka Rice filming at Hatton Locks in 1984

In the original version, the presenter was former BBC newsreader Kenneth Kendall and the "skyrunner" was broadcaster Anneka Rice. In the first series, Kendall was joined briefly in the studio for the handover of the first clue by the original clue-setter, Ann Meo. She would later rejoin the contestants if they had been successful in finding the treasure to offer her congratulations. If they had been unsuccessful, she would be heard as a voiceover explaining where they had gone wrong.

From the second series onwards, this role was expanded with the adjudicator being present throughout the episode, giving the contestants information on how they were doing against the scheduled time, and providing additional information about the locations visited. In series 2, this was Annette Lynton ("Nettie") who is married to Pink Floyd drummer Nick Mason. From series 3 onwards, TV-am weather girl Wincey Willis took over this role.

In 1988, Rice left to have a baby, and her place was taken by tennis player Annabel Croft. In this series, the set was revamped due to a move to Thames Television's facilities (the original studios were at Trilion in Soho, London, and then Limehouse Studios on Canary Wharf in Docklands, East London which was later earmarked for demolition to make way for One Canada Square), and Willis was promoted to sharing main billing with Kendall. Croft was billed as "Guest Skyrunner" for the first episode of the series, and it was stated at the time that Rice would return after giving birth, but it turned out to be the show's final series and the "Guest Skyrunner" credit was dropped.

In the BBC's 2002–2003 version, newsreader Dermot Murnaghan presented, the "skyrunner" was Suzi Perry, and there was no adjudicator. Advances in broadcasting technology meant that this new version could come from a much greater range of locations; however, the new version was short-lived.

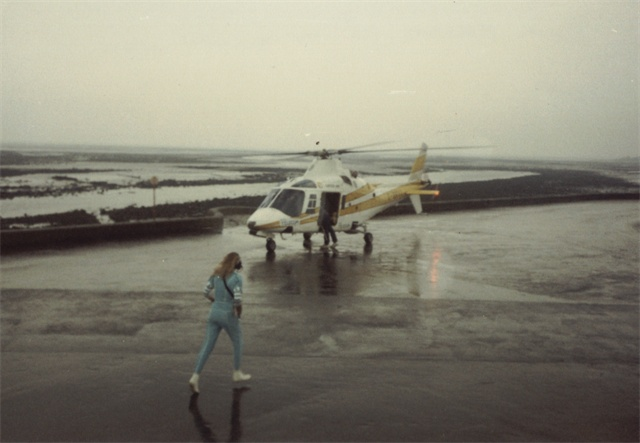
A Treasure Hunt helicopter used for the 1988 ITV Telethon special

Keith Thompson of Castle Air Charters was the usual helicopter pilot in both versions, though for overseas editions a local pilot was often used. There was always a "chase" helicopter which relayed radio signals back to London and, although this could never be used tactically by the contestants, it was not hidden from the viewers. This communications helicopter had dark green with gold stripe livery, registration G-SPEY.

Both helicopters were usually Bell 206 JetRangers; the helicopter usually used by the skyrunner was registration G-BHXU, which later ditched and sank in the English Channel in 1995 due to what is believed to have been an engine/gearbox failure – the pilot and engineer on board were both safely rescued after around 30 minutes in the water.

The contestants would win a cash prize of £1,000 (£2,000 in the revived version).

== Broadcasts ==
When first shown on Channel 4 on 28 December 1982, Treasure Hunt was one of the earliest major series on the then-new channel. The unusual format earned extra publicity for both the programme and the channel, which was striving to justify itself with new and different programming.

The 1982–1989 series were repeated on terrestrial television several times, and during the 1990s appeared on the Challenge satellite and cable channel, as well as Sky Travel. The first episode was repeated on 30 October 2007 on the digital channel More4 as part of Channel 4's 25th anniversary celebrations. This was a one-off and there are no current plans to repeat the TV show.

On 21 November 2013, Challenge announced that they re-acquired the first two series. The first episode was repeated again on 28 December 2013 as part of Challenge's First Ever Episodes weekend. Challenge confirmed that the re-run of series 1 and 2 would air on Saturdays and Sundays from 8 February 2014. The Saturday episode was screened at 6pm and the Sunday episode aired at 5pm (times varied afterwards).

The original run of the first series was watched by up to 900,000 viewers; however, by the mid-1980s, ratings were some of the highest for Channel 4 at around seven million.

Two charity editions of the show were produced, one locally in the London area for the Thames Television telethon in 1985 and another broadcast across the UK as part of the ITV network's Telethon '88. The show was also featured in an edition of the BBC children's aspiration show Jim'll Fix It, in which a young viewer joined Anneka Rice in the famous helicopter over the county of Surrey for a scaled down version of the show, in The Paul Daniels Magic Show (BBC) and in The Krypton Factor (Granada for ITV).

For all the UK series, the programme was a Chatsworth Television independent production in association with Tele Union Paris.

== Spin-offs ==
An eponymous board game based on the show was published in the UK. It involved moving pieces around a map of England and Wales.

There was also a computer game released for some home computer formats in 1986, including for the BBC Micro, published by Macsen Software. This game featured very basic graphic layout and was text-driven, and had the options of four locations to find clues in.

BBC Three Counties Radio aired Treasure Quest each Sunday from 9 am to 12 noon. Andy Gelder was in the studio and varying assistants in the radio car help two contestants to solve clues over the three-hour period. This format has now changed to Saturday mornings and now hosted by Jonathan Vernon-Smith, sharing with BBC Radio Northampton, with two runners running simultaneously in the two radio areas during the same programme. It aired from 9am until 12pm, and later 10am to 12pm. The show ended on 15 July 2023 after almost 10 years on air.

BBC Radio Norfolk began their own version of Treasure Quest in 2008, on Sunday mornings from 9 am to 12 noon. David Whiteley presents in the studio, with Sophie Little in the radio car. On 6 September 2009, Wincey Willis stood in for the then clue hunter Becky Betts, and on 14 February 2010, Anneka Rice took part in the programme, appearing at the fifth clue location, Norwich Castle, and then teaming up with Betts to find the treasure.

On London's talk station LBC, presenter James O'Brien hosted The Treasure Hunt on Wednesday lunchtimes as part of his weekday show. In this format, callers rang in and requested things they had been trying to get hold of, hoping that other listeners had the required items. Although otherwise unrelated to the original concept, the programme opened with the Treasure Hunt television series theme tune, and in August 2007, Anneka Rice recorded a voice-over lead-in for it.

BBC Radio Shropshire presented their own version of Treasure Hunt on Sunday mornings with presenter Ryan Kennedy reading out a set of clues to various locations. Prior to the first COVID-19 lockdown, the answers gave directions with a colleague driving to that location in the county. From the start of the first lockdown until Ryan's departure from the station in March 2023, the quiz operated as a virtual tour with the answers providing locations both in the county and worldwide.

Cambridge 105 Radio have also presented their own version called 'Where's Flossie Live!'. Flossie is name of the station's outside broadcast vehicle. This would air on a bank holiday weekend. Clues would be set around the city of Cambridge and a presenter, usually on a bike, accompanied by a sound/broadcast engineer would have to solve each clue at a different location to be able to move on to the next location. Flossie would be located at the final destination. The starting point was typically the station's studios on the Gwydir Street Enterprise Centre in Cambridge.

== Transmissions ==
=== Original ===
Series	Start date	End date	Episodes
1	28 December 1982	10 March 1983	11
2	5 January 1984	22 March 1984	12
3	27 December 1984	5 April 1985	13
4	27 December 1985	20 March 1986	13
5	12 February 1987	14 May 1987	14
6	18 February 1988	19 May 1988	14
7	16 February 1989	18 May 1989	14

==== Specials ====
Date	Entitle
17 March 1983	Series 1 Highlights
29 March 1984	Series 2 Highlights
30 October 1985	ITV Telethon Special
29 May 1988	ITV Telethon Special

=== Revival ===
Series	Start date	End date	Episodes
1	16 December 2002	20 December 2002	5
2	14 April 2003	2 August 2003	10

== List of episodes ==
=== 1982–1989 version ===
Series	Start date	End date	Episodes
1	28 December 1982	10 March 1983	11
Episode 1	(Indonesia) Bali		
Episode 2	(Scotland) Speyside		
Episode 3	(England) Suffolk		
Episode 4	(Wales) Powys		
Episode 5	(Scotland) Lothian		
Episode 6	(England) Wiltshire		
Episode 7	(England) London		
Episode 8	(Scotland) Isle of Mull		
Episode 9	(England) Gloucestershire; Featuring contestant Christopher Board		
Episode 10	(England) Lake District		
Episode 11	Singapore		
2	5 January 1984	22 March 1984	12
Episode 1	(France) Burgundy		
Episode 2	(England) Kent		
Episode 3	Guernsey		
Episode 4	(England) North Yorkshire		
Episode 5	(England) Birmingham		
Episode 6	(Spain) Mallorca		
Episode 7	Northern Ireland		
Episode 8	(England) Cambridgeshire		
Episode 9	(England) Cornwall		
Episode 10	Malta		
Episode 11	(Wales) Gwynedd		
Episode 12	(England) Merseyside		
3	28 December 1984	5 April 1985	13
Episode 1	Israel		
Episode 2	(England) Warwickshire		
Episode 3	(Wales) South Glamorgan		
Episode 4	(England) Norfolk		
Episode 5	(France) French Riviera		
Episode 6	(England) West Sussex		
Episode 7	(England) Somerset		
Episode 8	(England) Shropshire		
Episode 9	(Greece) Corfu		
Episode 10	(Scotland) Ayrshire		
Episode 11	(England) Isle of Wight		
Episode 12	(England) Derbyshire		
Episode 13	(England) London		
4	27 December 1985	20 March 1986	13
Episode 1	(United States) Florida		
Episode 2	(Wales) Clwyd		
Episode 3	(England) Oxfordshire		
Episode 4	(England) Surrey		
Episode 5	(England) Lake District		
Episode 6	(England) Bedfordshire		
Episode 7	(England) Devon		
Episode 8	(Scotland) Stirlingshire		
Episode 9	(England) Dorset		
Episode 10	(England) North Yorkshire		
Episode 11	(England) Nottinghamshire		
Episode 12	(Wales) Pembrokeshire		
Episode 13	(England) Cheshire		
5	12 February 1987	14 May 1987	14
Episode 1	Switzerland		
Episode 2	Jersey		
Episode 3	(England) Cornwall		
Episode 4	(England) Hampshire		
Episode 5	(England) Wiltshire		
Episode 6	(England) Hertfordshire		
Episode 7	Isle of Man		
Episode 8	(England) Buckinghamshire		
Episode 9	(England) Lancashire		
Episode 10	(Wales) Gwynedd		
Episode 11	(England) Northumberland		
Episode 12	(England) Kent		
Episode 13	(Scotland) West Highlands		
Episode 14	(England) North Yorkshire		
6	18 February 1988	19 May 1988	14
Episode 1	(Australia) Sydney		
Episode 2	(England) Suffolk		
Episode 3	(England) Lincolnshire		
Episode 4	(England) West Sussex		
Episode 5	(England) West Yorkshire		
Episode 6	(England) Buckinghamshire		
Episode 7	(Scotland) Scottish Borders		
Episode 8	(England) Wiltshire		
Episode 9	(England) Staffordshire		
Episode 10	(England) Devon		
Episode 11	(England) Cotswolds		
Episode 12	(Republic of Ireland) County Kerry		
Episode 13	(England) County Durham		
Episode 14	(Wales) Clwyd		
7	16 February 1989	18 May 1989	14
Episode 1	New Zealand		
Episode 2	(England) Worcestershire		
Episode 3	(England) Devon		
Episode 4	(England) Lake District		
Episode 5	(England) West Berkshire		
Episode 6	(Scotland) Perthshire		
Episode 7	(England) East Sussex		
Episode 8	(England) Buckinghamshire		
Episode 9	(England) Shropshire		
Episode 10	(England) Humberside		
Episode 11	(England) Somerset		
Episode 12	(Wales) Gwent		
Episode 13	(England) South Lancashire		
Episode 14	(England) Derbyshire		

=== 2002–2003 version ===
Series	Start date	End date	Episodes
8	16 December 2002	20 December 2002	5
Episode 1	(England) Folkestone, Kent		
Episode 2	(England) Canterbury, Kent		
Episode 3	(England) The Weald, Kent		
Episode 4	(England) Dover, Kent		
Episode 5	(England) West Kent, UK		
9	14 April 2003	2 August 2003	10
Episode 1	(United States) San Francisco		
Episode 2	Mexico City		
Episode 3	(New Zealand) Rotorua		
Episode 4	(Australia) Alice Springs		
Episode 5	(Australia) Melbourne		
Episode 6	(United States) Arizona		
Episode 7	(Australia) Tasmania		
Episode 8	(United States) New Orleans		
Episode 9	(New Zealand) Christchurch		
Episode 10	(Australia) Gold Coast		
