= Michel Cordes =

French actor (1945–2023)

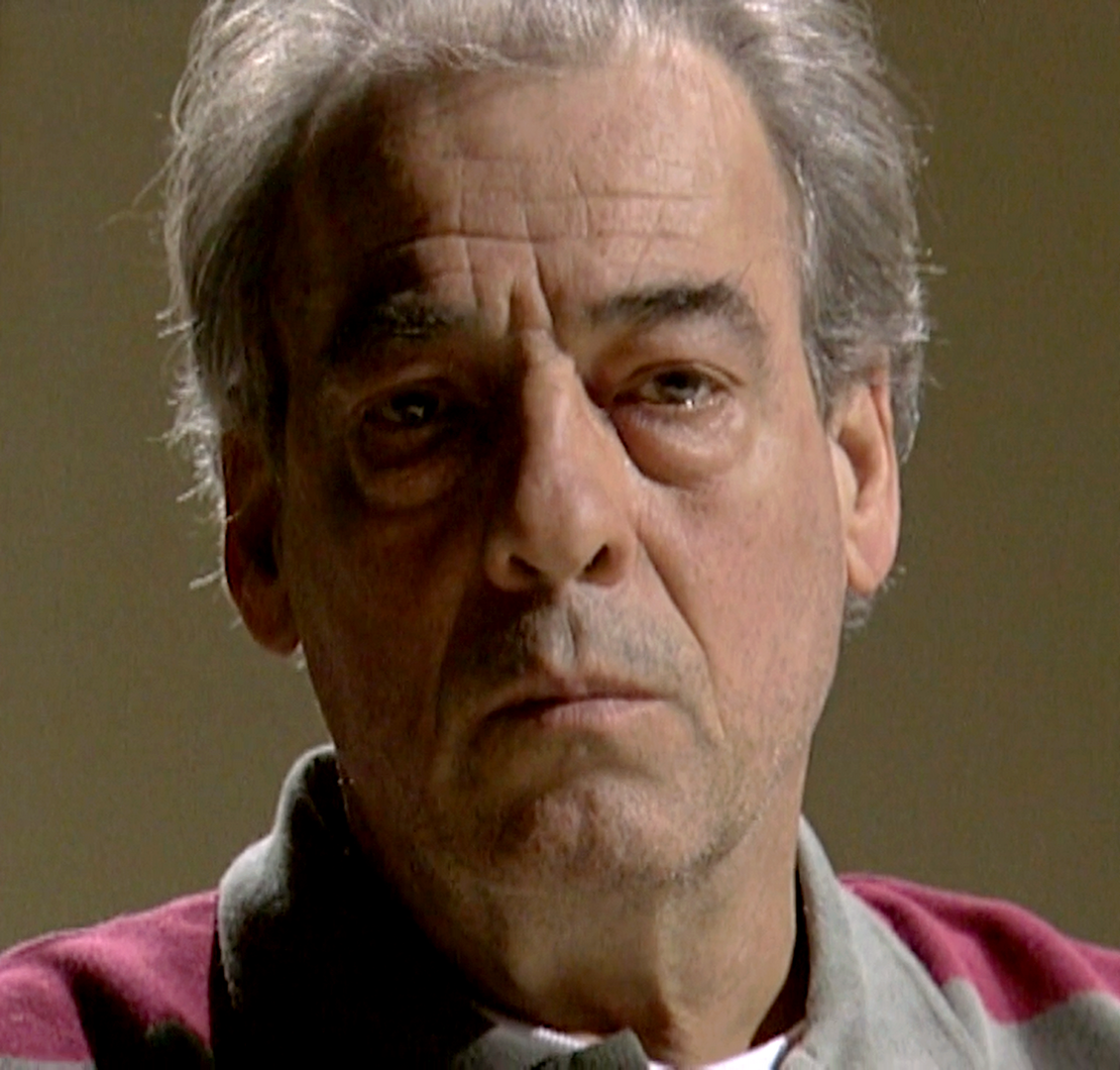
- Cordes in 2005
- Born: 20 October 1945; Siran, France
- Died: 5 May 2023 (aged 77); Grabels, France
- Occupations: Actor; author; director

Michel Cordes (20 October 1945 – 5 May 2023) was a French actor, author, and stage director.

== Biography ==
Michel Cordes was born 20 October 1945 in Siran, where he lived until age 5. His father Léon Cordes was a writer. Michel attended the Montpellier theatre conservatory.

He was best known for his role as Roland Marci in the soap opera Plus belle la vie. This role restricted his options for other work. Cordes died from suicide by gunshot on 5 May 2023, at the age of 77, at his home in Grabels.

== Filmography ==
=== Film ===
- 1993: Poisson-lune
- 1993: Le Hussard sur le toit
- 1997: Didier
- 2000: Passionnément
- 2000: Une affaire de goût
- 2000: Sous le sable
- 2001: Mon père, il m'a sauvé la vie
- 2001: La isla del holandés
- 2002: Carnages
- 2003: Effroyables Jardins
- 2003: La Fin du règne animal

=== Television ===
==== Television films ====
- 1995: Les Louves: Lucien
- 1997: Mauvaises affaires: l'avocat de Ségur
- 1998: La Femme de l'Italien: Gérard
- 2001: Permission Moisson: Émile Blanc
- 2001: Le Prix de la vérité: Louis Vaudran
- 2003: Fragile: l'adjudant-chef
- 2005: La Parenthèse interdite: Jean
- 2009: La Fille du désert: Roland Marci
- 2013: Petits arrangements avec l'amour: Roland Marci
- 2014: Une vie en Nord: Roland
- 2016: Infiltration: Roland Marci
- 2016: La Promesse du feu: André le Guen
- 2019: La Promesse de l'eau: André

==== Television series ====
- 1989: V comme vengeance
- 1991: Le Roi Mystère
- 1994: Police Secrets
- 1995: L'Instit
- 1996: Sara
- 1996–1997: L'Avocate
- 1998: Le Sélec
- 1999: L'Histoire du samedi
- 1999: Tramontane
- 2003: Cuéntame
- 2003: Le Camarguais
- 2003: Une femme d'honneur
- 2004–2022: Plus belle la vie
- 2014: Nos chers voisins
- 2023: La Seria
