= Hornus =

Hornus is a surname. Notable people with the surname include:

- Cécilia Hornus (born 1963), French actress
- Pierre Hornus (1908–1995), French footballer

== See also ==
- Hornussen
- Grand-Hornu
