= Cécilia Hornus =

French actress

Cecilia Hornus
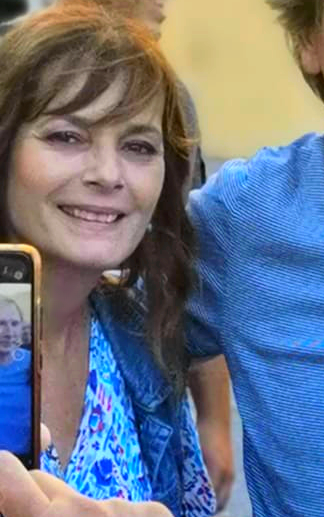
- Cecilia Hornus in 2022
- Born: Cecilia Hornus; 27 September 1963 (age 63); Antwerp, Belgium
- Known for: Plus belle la vie Plus belle la vie, encore plus belle

Cecilia Hornus (born 27 September 1963) is a French actress. She is best known for playing Blanche Marci in the television series Plus belle la vie, which she played from August 2004 to November 2022. She reprised the role in 2024 in Plus belle la vie, encore plus belle.

== Biography ==
=== Early life ===
Cecilia Hornus was born on 27 September 1963 in Antwerp, Belgium. She first lived in Antwerp and Brussels until the age of 7 ans, then in Paris, France, where she discovered theatre through a teacher at high school.

She entered the National Theatre School of Saint-Germain-en-Laye, then, in 1983, joined with her sister Alison the National Conservatory of Dramatic Art where she spent two years in the class of Michel Bouquet, then one year in that of Daniel Mesguich.

=== Career ===
Since 30 August 2004, Cecilia Hornus has been playing the role of Blanche Marci in the series Plus belle la vie.

She has also used her fame to support various charities such as the Téléthon and by participating in the television show Fort Boyard. She is fluent in English and speaks some Russian. She is involved with the ELA association alongside other actors from Plus belle la vie, including Dounia Coesens, who played her daughter in the series.

She is an honorary godmother of Association européenne contre les leucodystrophies (European Association against Leukodystrophies). She is also involved with Le Ruban rose, a Breast Cancer Association.

From 8 to 28 July 2014, she appeared at the Avignon Festival with (her friend, and future husband) her Plus belle la vie co-star, Thierry Ragueneau, in the play Bon Anniversaire Mon Amour. The play was a success and was followed by a theatrical tour throughout France, Switzerland and Cayenne until 2017.

In 2016, still at the Avignon Festival, she played the play After the Rain by Sergi Belbel (3 nominations for the Molières and Molière for best comedy show) in a production directed by Marion Bierry.

=== Personal life ===
Cecilia Hornus married actor and director Azize Kabouche in 1990 and they have two children: Léo (born 1993) and Emma (born 1998) who both also became actors.

In 2017 she married actor Thierry Ragueneau, whom she met on the set of Plus belle la vie and who played her husband at the beginning of the series.

== Education ==
- 1983-1986: Conservatoire national supérieur d'art dramatique in Paris, professors: Michel Bouquet, Daniel Mesguich, Philippe Adrien
- 1990: Chekhov and Stanislavski workshop at the Théâtre des Amandiers Nanterre with actors from the Moscow Art Theatre.
- 2004: Corneille Internship, Brigitte Jaques-Wajeman

== Theatre ==
Cecilia Hornus has performed in numerous pieces from the classical repertoire, the history of which is as follows:

- 1983-1984: Un Homme Nommé Jésus, directed by Robert Hossein, Palais des sports de Paris
- 1985: Le Cid, by Corneille, directed by Dominique Liquière, Festival de Carpentras
- 1986: Les caprices de Marianne, by Alfred de Musset, directed by René Jaunneau, Festival de Valréas
- 1986: Le Nègre, by Didier Van Cauwelaert, directed by Pierre Boutron, Théâtre des Bouffes-Parisiens in Paris
- 1986: La Méprise, by Marivaux, directed by Philippe Adrien, Théâtre de l'Athénée-Louis-Jouvet in Paris
- 1987: Le Capitaine Fracasse, by Théophile Gautier, directed by Marcel Maréchal, Théâtre de Paris, Théâtre La Criée
- 1988: Le Malade imaginaire, by Molière, directed by Pierre Boutron, Théâtre Hébertot in Paris
- 1989: La Mort de Danton, by Georg Büchner, directed by Klaus Michael Grüber, Théâtre Nanterre-Amandiers, TNP Villeurbanne, Maison de la culture de Grenoble, Comédie de Caen, (Festival d'automne).
- 1990: Ottla Kafka, by Jean-Pierre Raffaelli, directed by Jean-Pierre Raffaelli, Théâtre La Criée in Marseille
- 1992: Noces à Tipasa, by Albert Camus, directed by Baki Boumaza, Théâtre de Beaubourg in Paris
- 1992: Le Fou et la nonne, by Witkiewicz, directed by Abbes Zahmani, Théâtre de la Main d'or in Paris
- 1992: La Belle Alphrède, by Jean de Rotrou, directed by Xavier Brière, Théâtre de la Main d’or à Paris
- 1993: Dieu Merci on ne meurt qu'une fois, by Monique Henkel, directed by Abbès Zahmani, Alès Festival
- 1995: L'Illusion comique, by Corneille, directed by Arlette Téphany, Théâtre national at Limoges
- 1996: Père, by August Strindberg, directed by Martine Charlet, Théâtre at l’Arsenic Lausanne
- 1996: Les Femmes savantes, by Molière, directed by Gilles Bouillon, Tours Drama Centre
- 1996-1997: Rodogune, directed by Arlette Téphany, Théâtre du Petit Montparnasse (nominated for the Molières 1997 Award for Best Play in the Repertoire) in Paris
- 1997: L'Étau: je rêve mais peut-être pas, by Luigi Pirandello, directed by Martine Charlet, Théâtre 221 à Lausanne
- 1998: Lettres d'Algérie, directed by Baki Boumaza, Théâtre du Grütli in Geneva, Théâtre Boulimie in Lausanne
- 1998: Après la pluie, by Sergi Belbel, directed by Marion Bierry, Théâtre de Poche Montparnasse (3 Molière Award nominations, and Molières 1999 Award for Best Comedy) in Paris
- 1999: September, by Woody Allen directed by Joseph Hardy, Théâtre Mouffetard à Paris
- 2000-2001: Après la pluie, by Sergi Belbel, directed by Marion Bierry, Théâtre at Poche Montparnasse in Paris
- 2001-2002: La Sonate des spectres, by August Strindberg, directed by Martine Charlet, Théâtre de l'Arsenic in Lausanne
- 2002: Sganarelle: le Sicilien, de Molière, directed by Gilles Bouillon, Centre dramatique de Tours
- 2003: La Surprise de l'amour, by Marivaux, directed by Gilles Bouillon, CDN de Tours, Artistics Athévains in Paris
- 2008: À la manière d'eux, directed by Richard Guedj, Théâtre du Gymnase in Marseille
- 2013: Bon anniversaire mon amour, by Thierry Ragueneau and Corinne Hyafil, directed by Christian François, Festival off Avignon, Théâtre de l’Étincelle
- 2014: Bon anniversaire mon amour, by Thierry Ragueneau and Corinne Hyafil, directed by Christian François, Festival off Avignon, Théâtre des 3 soleils
- 2015: Bon anniversaire mon amour by Thierry Ragueneau and Corinne Hyafil, directed by Christian François, Théâtre Comédie Bastille à Paris
- 2016: Après la pluie by Sergi Belbel, directed by Marion Bierry, Festival d'Avignon off
- 2017: Pour l'amour du fisc de Thierry Ragueneau, directed by Stéphan Druet, Festival d'Avignon, then tour
- 2022: La Dernière lettre written and directed by Violaine Arsac, Festival Off d'Avignon

== Filmography ==
=== Films ===
- 1986: Le Débutant by Daniel Janneau
- 1987: La Vallée fantôme by Alain Tanner
- 1991: Au Petit Bonheur by Azize Kabouche
- 1992: Demain à Hollywood by J.-F. Villemin
- 1994: Le Paradis des infidèles by Azize Kabouche
- 1997: Terminale by Francis Girod
- 2001: Lettres d'Algérie by Azize Kabouche
- 2001: Quelque chose de mal by Namir Abdel Nesseh
- 2004: Les Courants by Sofia Norlin

=== Télévision ===
- 1988: S.O.S disparus - L'autre planète by Maurice Frydland: Julie
- 1988: S.O.S disparus - Fati et ses frères by Claude Grinberg: Julie
- 1989: S.O.S disparus - L’eau bleue by Daniel Losset: Julie
- 1989: S.O.S disparus - Marie la nuit deby Pierre Boutron: Julie
- 1989: S.O.S disparus - Ce train ne prend pas de voyageurs by Jacques Renard: Julie
- 1989: S.O.S disparus - La photo de Paul by Michel Favart: Julie
- 1991: Cas de divorce ("Episode 13: "Antwerp vs. Antwerp", 26-minute series): Mme Murielle Anvers
- 1994: Le juge est une femme by Pierre Boutron
- 2004 - 2022: Plus belle la vie: Blanche Marci (France 3)
- 2007: Chez Maupassant - Hautot père et fils by Jacques Treffouel
- 2007: L'Enfant au cœur de l'école
- 2012: Joséphine, ange gardien: Suivez le guide
- 2012: À la recherche du droit by Virgile Bayle and Jason Roffé: Marie
- 2015: Nina by Adeline Darraux
- 2020: La Stagiaire, season 5: Marie
- 2021: Munch, season 4: Amélie, la mère de Gaspard
- 2022: Meurtres dans les gorges du Verdon by Stephan Kopecky: Marie
- 2024: Plus belle la vie, encore plus belle: Blanche Marci (TF1)
- 2024: Simon Coleman season 2, episode 5 by Nicolas Copin
