= Dounia Coesens =

French actress (born 1988)

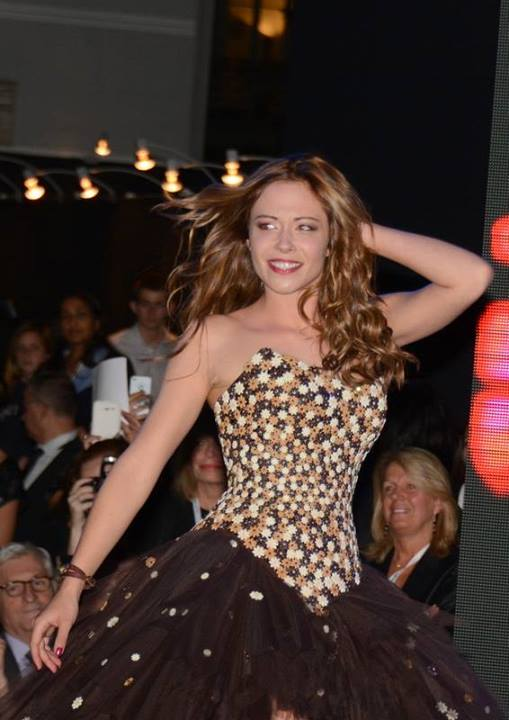
- Dounia Coesens in 2013
- Born: 20 September 1988 (age 37); Aix-en-Provence, Bouches-du-Rhône, France
- Occupation: Actress
- Years active: 2001–present

Dounia Coesens (born 20 September 1988) is a French actress. In 2012, Coesens competed on the television show Fort Boyard.

== Filmography ==
Year	Title	Role	Director	Notes
2005	Merci, les enfants vont bien!	Alexandra	Stéphane Clavier	TV series (1 episode)
2005	Poids plume		Nolwenn Lemesle	Short
2006	Le proc	Bathalie	Jean-Marc Seban	
2007	Le temps des amours	Young Isabelle	Thierry Chabert	TV movie
2007	Le réveillon des bonnes	Catherine Sevran-Chabot	Michel Hassan	TV mini-series
2012	Intérêt général	Valérie	Hafid Aboulahyane	Short
2012	Joséphine, ange gardien	Fanny	Patrick Volson	TV series (1 episode)
2013	Enquêtes réservées	Lucie Leblanc	Étienne Dhaene	TV series (2 episodes)
2013	Camping paradis	Alice	Philippe Proteau	TV series (1 episode)
2004–2022	Plus belle la vie	Johanna Marci	Several directors	TV series (590 episodes)
2014	La disparue du Pyla	Elise Castel	Didier Albert	TV movie
2014	Déconnexion	Léa	Jérémie Prigent & François Rémond	Short
2015	Meurtres à La Rochelle	Justine Balmont	Étienne Dhaene (2)	TV movie
2016	Dehors, tu vas avoir si froid		Arnaud Sadowski	
2016	Hasard et Sérendipité sont dans un bateau		Théo Frilet	Short

== Theater ==
Year	Title	Role	Director	Notes
2008	La femme, le mari et l'amant		Richard Guedj	adaptation of Colette Renard
2010-2011	Pauvre France	Martine	Bernard Menez and Fabrice Lotou	
2012	Accalmies passagères	Marie-Annick	Thierry Harcourt	adaptation of Xavier Daugreilh
2012-2013	Va jusqu'où tu pourras	Dounia	Joëlle Cattino	
2014	Si on recommençait		Steve Suissa	adaptation of Éric-Emmanuel Schmitt
