= Ingrid Chauvin =

French television and stage actress (born 1973)

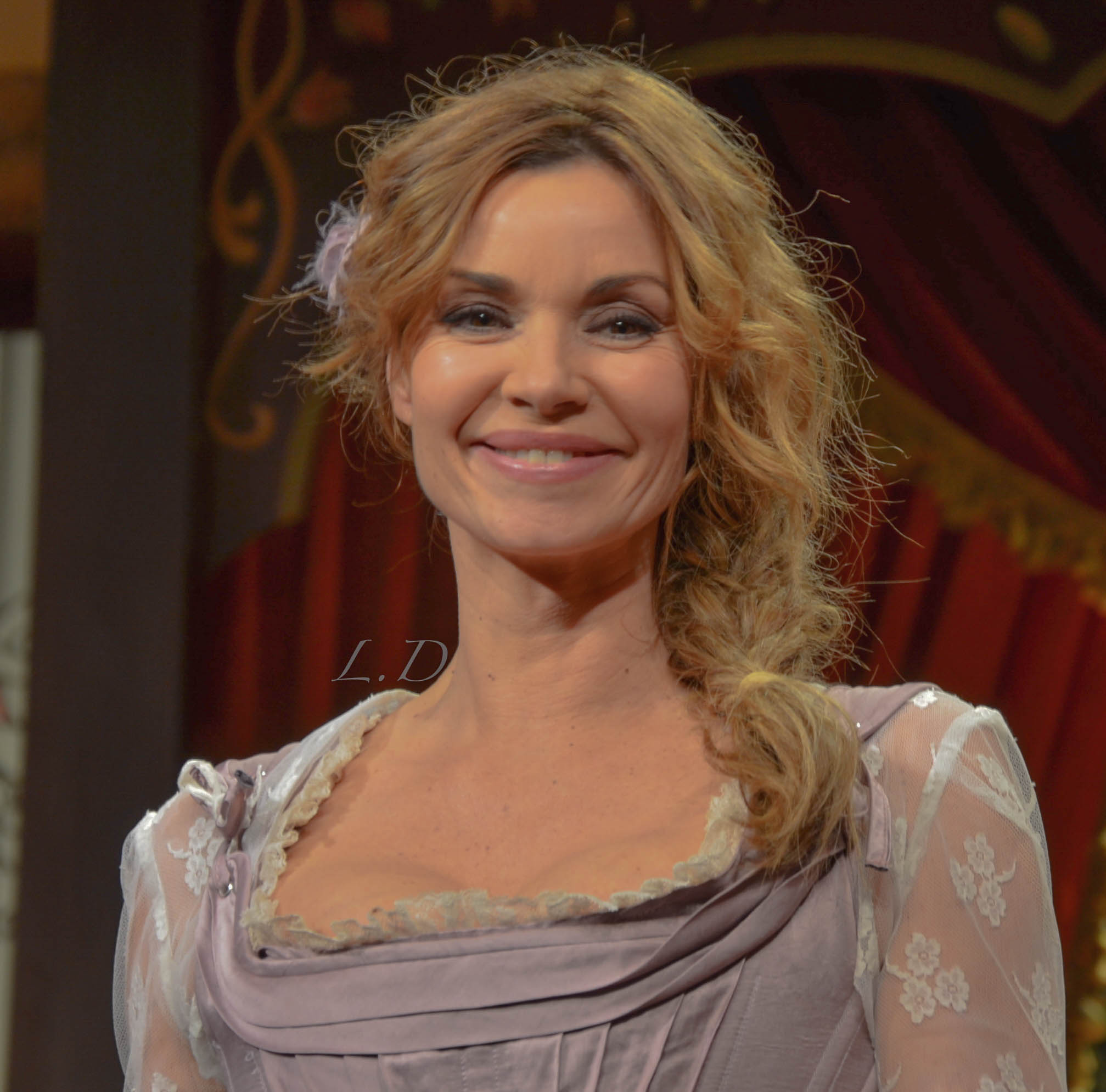
- Ingrid Chauvin in 2015
- Born: 3 October 1971 (age 55); Argenteuil, Val-d'Oise, France
- Occupation: Actress
- Years active: 1997–present
- Spouse: Thierry Peythieu (2011–present)

Ingrid Chauvin (French pronunciation: [inɡʁid ʃɔvɛ̃]; born 3 October 1971) is a French television and stage actress, known for her roles in the miniseries Méditerranée, Dolmen, and the police procedural series Femmes de loi.

== Early life and career ==
Ingrid Chauvin was born on 3 October 1971 in Argenteuil in the department of Val-d'Oise, to a lifeguard father and a watercolor painter and documentalist mother. Despite her parents' opposition, Ingrid sought to become an actress since she was a child. Her parents then divorced when she was eight. After that, her mother had a relationship with a computer scientist, who is seven years younger than her. They had a son, Jérémy, who is now a tenor.

Since childhood, Chauvin had wanted to become a veterinarian or an actress. After her studies, she worked as a professional make-up artist, especially for pornographic productions, while attending some castings for modeling. At age 19, due to her physical beauty, she posed for a number of photographers and had her first castings. Her first earnings allowed her to take acting classes. She was noticed by AB Production, which led to small roles on television.

== Acting career ==
It was in the theater that Chauvin got a serious start to her career, acting alongside Michel Roux in Tromper n'est pas jouer by Patrick Cargill in 1997 at the Théâtre Saint-Georges in Paris, and later with Michel Creton in Sylvia in 1998 at the Théâtre Hébertot in Paris. She revived these roles on a tour throughout France.

In 1997, Chauvin participated in an episode of the prime time TV series Les Bœuf-carottes, and has since become a regular presence in the police drama series. She also made an appearance in TV movies like Tapage nocturne and Le fil du rasoir. Consequently, she has enjoyed a successful career in TV movies such as Dormir avec le diable in 2000. The following year, she played Marie Valbonne in Méditerranée, the prominent summer series of TF1.

In 2000, she rose to fame in the series Femmes de loi with Natacha Amal, broadcast on TF1, when she portrayed the role of Marie Balaguère, a police lieutenant. She finally left the series in 2007. In summer 2005, she played in the miniseries Dolmen, broadcast on TF1, playing one of the two main roles alongside Bruno Madinier. In 2008, she appeared in a series titled La Main Blanche, broadcast on TF1 and filmed in Guérande, near Saint-Nazaire, where her grandparents live.

== Personal life ==
Chauvin was the victim on 25 August 2003 in a serious car accident, resulting in several fractures including one at the vertebral column and months of rehabilitation.

From 2001 to 2004, she was the partner of actor Laurent Hennequin. From 2004 to 2006, she had a relationship with the actor Jean-Michel Tinivelli.

She married on 27 August 2011 in Lège-Cap-Ferret Thierry Peythieu, who was the first director assistant of the series Les Toqués. They expected their first child in October 2013. Their first child was born on 17 October 2013, a daughter named Jade, who died at only 5 months old on 25 March 2014 in a sudden death. Their son Tom was born on 10 June 2016.

== Filmography ==
- 1997 : Les Bœuf-carottes as Sylvie Kaan (episode "La Manière forte")
- 1998 : Tapage nocturne as Claire Baron
- 1999 : Le Fil du rasoir as Lisa Vergnes
- 2000 : B.R.I.G.A.D. as Julia (season 1)
- 2000–07 : Femmes de loi as Lieutenant Marie Balaguère (25 episodes)
- 2000 : Dormir avec le diable as Leslie
- 2001 : Méditerranée as Marie Valbonne (5 episodes)
- 2005 : Dolmen as Marie Kermeur (6 episodes)
- 2007 : Chassé croisé amoureux as Elsa Brémont
- 2007 : La Taupe as Commissaire Sandra Longo
- 2007 : Le Monsieur d'en face as Nathalie Delambre
- 2007 : Suspectes as Marina Devaux (8 episodes)
- 2008 : La Main blanche as Marion Ravel (4 episodes)
- 2009–11 : Les Toqués as Fanny Marsan (6 episodes)
- 2009 : La Taupe 2 as Commissaire Sandra Longo
- 2011–12 : Week-end chez les toquées as Fanny Marsan (5 episodes)
- 2012 : On se quitte plus as Manon Bonnel
- 2013 : Une bonne leçon as Marion
- 2014 : Camping Paradis as Ingrid (episode "Éclipse au camping")
- 2014 : Nos chers voisins : Un Noël presque parfait as Hélène (guest role)
- 2015 : Murders at Mont Ventoux as Alexia Mejean
- 2017 : Joséphine, ange gardien as Charline (episode "Sur le cœur")
- 2017–present : Demain nous appartient as Chloé Delcourt
- 2020–present : Ici tout commence as Chloé Delcourt
- 2021 : La Vengeance au Triple Galop as La Juge (TV film)

== Publications ==
- Plon, ed. (2015). À cœurt ouvert (in French). p. 220. ISBN 9782259229586.
- Plon, ed. (2016). Croire au bonheur (in French). p. 216. ISBN 9782259251174.
