= Dolmen (miniseries) =

French TV miniseries

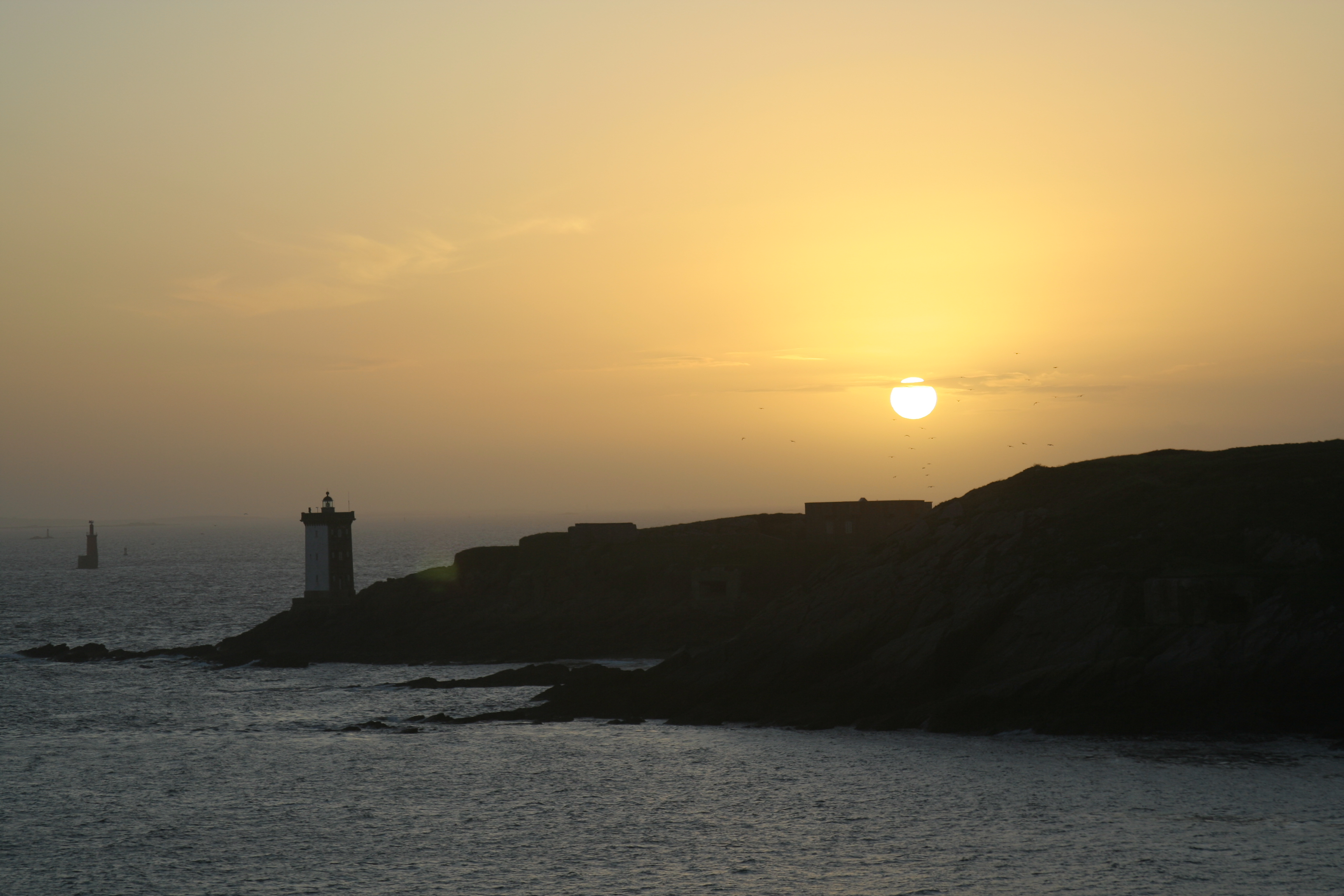
- Kermorvan lighthouse
- Genre: Crime miniseries
- Screenplay by: Marianne Le Pezennec; Nicole Jamet
- Story by: Nicole Jamet; Marie-Anne Le Pezennec
- Directed by: Didier Albert; Eric Summer
- Starring: Ingrid Chauvin; Catherine Wilkening; Yves Rénier; Xavier Deluc
- Theme music composer: Frédéric Porte
- Country of origin: France
- Original language: French
- No. of seasons: 1
- No. of episodes: 6

Production
- Running time: 90 minutes
- Production companies: TF1; Marathon Productions

Original release
- Network: TF1
- Release: June 13, 2005

Dolmen is a French TV miniseries consisting of six 90 minute-long episodes, and starring Ingrid Chauvin. It was written by Nicole Jamet and Marie-Anne Le Pezennec, and broadcast for the first time between 13 June and 18 July 2005 on TF1.

== Synopsis ==
The story is set in Ty Kern, an island off the coast of Brittany (which is, in real life, Belle-Île-en-Mer). In Ty Kern, four families are connected by ancient rivalries and secrets: the Kersaints, the Le Bihans, the Pérecs, and the Kermeurs. Marie Kermeur, a young police lieutenant, returns to the island to marry her childhood love, Christian Bréhat. But on the day before their wedding, strange events begin to happen. The bloody corpse of a seagull is brought in by the tide, Marie is assaulted by strange nightmares during the night, her brother Gildas is found dead, and menhirs near the town begin to ooze blood.

Aided by an inspector from the mainland, Lucas Fersen, Marie decides to clarify these strange phenomena. It is at this time that a series of deaths begin to occur.

== Cast and characters ==
Family tree
vieux Pérec
Yves
?	Aude
Chantal
?	Anne
?	Christian
Marie
Gildas
Millic
?
Jeanne	Nicolas
Loïc
Yvon
Yannick
Hervé
Pierric
Yvonne
Gwenaëlle
Ronan
Philippe
unborn
Armelle
Juliette
Arthus	Pierre-Marie
?	Erwan
Mary
Sean
Tom

=== Kermeur family ===
Proprietors of a hotel.

- Marie, lieutenant of the Gendarmerie in Brest (Ingrid Chauvin)
- Millic, Marie's father (later known not to be so) (Jean-Louis Foulquier)
- Jeanne, Marie's mother (later known not to be so) (Martine Sarcey)
- Gildas, Marie's other brother (Luc Thuiller)
- Loïc, Marie's brother (Manuel Gélin)
- Nicolas, Loïc's son (Tom Hygreck)

=== Pérec family ===
- Yves, medical doctor and mayor (Marc Rioufol)
- Chantal, Yves' wife (Catherine Wilkening)
- Aude, daughter of Yves and Chantal (Lizzie Brocheré)

=== Kersaint family ===
- Arthus, Châtelain (Georges Wilson)
- Pierre-Marie ("PM"), Arthus' son (Hippolyte Girardot)
- Erwan de Kersaint, Arthus' son and Marie's real father (both secrets later to be revealed) (Yves Rénier)
- Armelle, Pierre-Marie's wife (Laure Killing)
- Juliette, daughter of Pierre-Marie and Armelle (Emilie de Preissac)

=== Le Bihan family ===
Owners of a faïencerie (factory for fancy pottery)

- Yvonne, head of the business (Nicole Croisille)
- Pierric, Yvonne's mentally handicapped son (Chick Ortega)
- Gwenaëlle (often shortened to Gwen), Yvonne's daughter (Micky Sébastian)
- Philippe, Gwenaëlle's husband (Didier Bienaimé)
- Ronan, son of Gwenaëlle and Philippe (Thomas de Sambi)

=== Other characters ===
- Christian Bréhat, Marie Kermeur's fiancé, a famous Yacht racing captain (Xavier Deluc)
- Anne Bréhat, Christian's sister, owner of a café at Ty Kern (Brigitte Froment)
- Lucas Fersen, major in the Brest Gendarmerie (Bruno Madinier)
- Patrick Ryan (false identity adopted by Erwan de Kersaint), Irish novelist
- Stéphane Morineau, head of computer forensics for the Brest Gendarmerie (Richard Valls)

== Technical details ==
- Directed by: Didier Albert
- Screenplay: Marianne Le Pezennec and Nicole Jamet
- Production: TF1 and Marathon Productions

=== Filming locations ===
- Port of Ty Kern: port of Sauzon, Belle-Île-en-Mer.
- Faïencerie Le Bihan: the faïencerie HB-Henriot, Quimper.
- The lighthouse: the lighthouse of the Kermorvan peninsula, at Le Conquet.
- Site de Guénoc (English: Guénoc place—the bleeding menhirs): built with concrete on a metallic structure on the Kermorvan peninsula, near the lighthouse at Le Conquet.
- Château des Kersaint (the castle of the Kersaint family): Château de Kerouartz, in Lannilis. It is an early 17th-century mansion, where a woman was, in fact, murdered.

== International broadcast ==
- Basque Country: ETB2, October 2006 — November 2006
- Belgium: RTL TVI, June 2005 – July 2005
- Germany: RTL 2, November 2006
- Hungary: RTL Klub, 2006 summer
- Italy: Rete 4, August 2006 – September 2006
- Portugal: RTP1, August 2006
- Switzerland: TSR, June 2005 – July 2005
- Poland: TVP 1, February 2006
- Russia: TV3, May 2007
- Finland: MTV3, June 2007 — August 2007
- Slovenia: POP TV, July 2007 — August 2007
- Portugal: RTP1, December 2007
- Czech Republic: TV Nova, January 2008
- Catalunya: TV3, January 2008
- Netherlands: Misdaatnet (Dutch commercial crime TV network), May 2011
- United States: MHz WorldView, September 2013

== Accolades ==
Year	Awards	Category	Recipient	Result
2006	Globes de Cristal Award	Best TV Movie / TV Series	Didier Albert	Nominated
