= Jean-Marie Bigard =

French comedian and actor (born 1954)

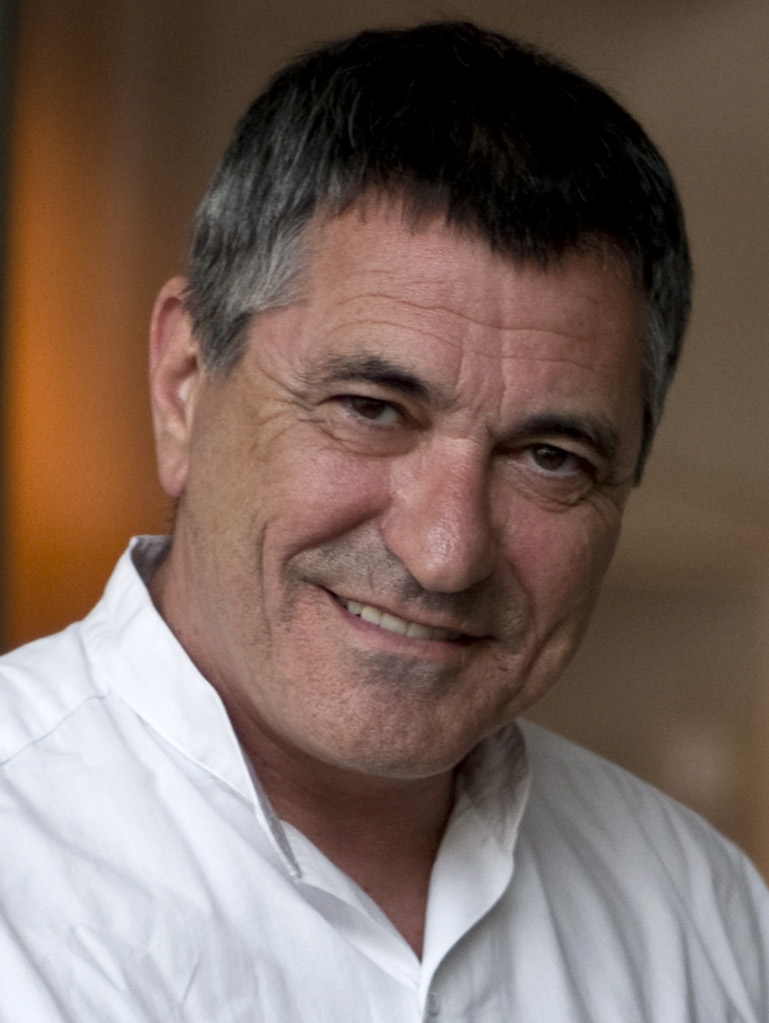
- Bigard in 2009
- Born: Jean-Marie Bigard; 17 May 1954 (age 71); Charmont-sous-Barbuise, Grand Est, France
- Years active: 1988–present
- Spouses: Claudia Bigard (1991–2009), Lola Marois (2011–present)
- Children: 3

Jean-Marie Bigard (French pronunciation: [ʒɑ̃maʁi biɡaʁ]; born 17 May 1954) is a French comedian and actor. Known for his often controversial humour, he has performed at some of the largest entertainment facilities in France, including the Paris-Bercy Arena and Stade de France. Bigard is a close friend of former French President Nicolas Sarkozy, whom he accompanied on an official visit to Pope Benedict XVI in Rome.

== Personal life ==
Jean-Marie Bigard married Claudia Bigard in February 1991. The couple have one child, Sasha, born on 19 June 2009. They divorced in August 2009. He then married the comedian Lola Marois in May 2011. They are the parents of twins, Jules, Florian Jourda and Bella. Marois defends his right to speak freely.

== Theater ==
Year	Title	Notes
1988	Vous avez dit Bigard ?	One Man Show
1990	Oh Ben Oui !	One Man Show
1992	Le nouveau Bigard au Palais des glaces	One Man Show
1993	Bigard Intégral	One Man Show
1995	100 % Tout Neuf	One Man Show
2000	Bigard met le Paquet	One Man Show
2001	Bigard bourre Bercy	One Man Show
2003	Des Animaux et des Hommes	One Man Show
2004	Bigard au Stade de France	One Man Show
2006	Le Bourgeois gentilhomme	Play
2006	Mon psy va mieux	One Man Show
2008	Clérambard	Play
2009	La tournée du patron	One Man Show
2010	Bigard remet le paquet	One Man Show
2011	Le Coup de la cigogne	Play
2012	№9 de Bigard	One Man Show
2014	Bigard fête ses 60 ans	One Man Show
2015	100% Bigard	One Man Show
2016	Nous les femmes	One Man Show

== Filmography ==
Year	Title	Role	Director	Notes
1989	À deux minutes près	The store SOS	Eric Le Hung	
1990	La grande embrouille	Paulo	Claude Guillemot	TV movie
1991	Les secrets professionnels du Dr Apfelglück	Café's owner	Several	
1992	Les cravates léopards	Gonzales	Jean-Luc Trotignon	TV movie
1996	Oui	Stéphane	Alexandre Jardin	
1996	Toniglandyl		Myriam Isker	TV Short
1997	Arlette	Victor	Claude Zidi	
1998	Lautrec	Aristide Bruant	Roger Planchon	
1998	Le clone	Dental customer	Fabio Conversi	
1999	L'âme-soeur	Rémi	Jean-Marie Bigard	
2001	La boîte	Roger	Claude Zidi (2)	
2001	Philosophale		Farid Fedjer	
2001	Gilbert Mouclade était un marrant	Himself	Elie-Alexandre Le Hoangan & Camille Saféris	Short
2002	And Now... Ladies and Gentlemen	Dr. Larry	Claude Lelouch	
2003	The Car Keys	The bank manager	Laurent Baffie	
2003	Les gaous	Dédé	Igor Sekulic	
2003	Le dirlo: Lucie	François Ragueneau	Patrick Volson	TV movie
2005	L'homme qui voulait passer à la télé	Roger Hano	Amar Arhab & Fabrice Michelin	TV movie
2006	Hé M'sieur! - Des yeux pour entendre	Antoine Charpentier	Patrick Volson (2)	TV movie
2007	New délire	The producer	Eric Le Roch	
2008	Un vrai papa Noël	Manu	José Pinheiro	TV movie
2009	Le missionnaire	Mario	Roger Delattre	
2010	Le grand restaurant	A client	Gérard Pullicino	TV movie
2011	Les recalés du permis	Jealous husband	Olivier Belmondo & Lucas Rue	Short
2012	Un Marocain à Paris		Saïd Naciri	
2013	Nos chers voisins	Serge	Emmanuel Rigaut	TV series (1 episode)
2014	R.I.S, police scientifique	Carrera	Olivier Barma	TV series (1 episode)
2016	Le cabanon rose	The Brigadier	Jean-Pierre Mocky	
2017	Vive la crise		Jean-François Davy	
2017	Chacun sa vie et son intime conviction		Claude Lelouch (2)	

== Radio ==
- From 2014 to 2016 : Les pieds dans le plat on Europe 1
