= Plus belle la vie =

French television soap opera

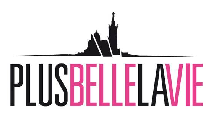
- Genre: Soap opera
- Theme music composer: Maidi Roth
- Country of origin: France
- Original language: French
- No. of seasons: 18
- No. of episodes: 4665 + 29 specials

Production
- Executive producers: Hubert Besson, Telfrance
- Production locations: Marseille, France
- Running time: 24 minutes
- Production company: Groupe Telfrance

Original release
- Network: France 3
- Release: 30 August 2004 – 18 November 2022

Plus belle la vie (More beautiful life) is a French television soap opera based on an idea by Hubert Besson and characters created by Georges Desmouceaux, Bénédicte Achard, Magaly Richard-Serrano and Olivier Szulzynger. On air from 30 August 2004 until 18 November 2022, it was shown on France 3 on Monday to Friday evenings at 8:15 p.m. The show began with 17 main actors and gained more later.

On 11 July 2008, France 3 broadcast its 1000th episode, a milestone in French television. The series set a second record on 8 June 2012, airing its 2000th episode. On 22 April 2016, it broadcast its 3000th episode, and on 21 February 2020, its 4000th.

== Plot ==
The series follows the daily lives of the inhabitants of "Le Mistral", a fictional neighbourhood in the Mediterranean port city of Marseille, where wealthy and less than wealthy families co-exist. It focuses on their evolving love lives and friendships and on the criminal intrigues in which certain residents of the neighbourhood are involved.

== Main cast ==
Lætitia Milot, candidate of Danse avec les stars as Mélanie Rinato

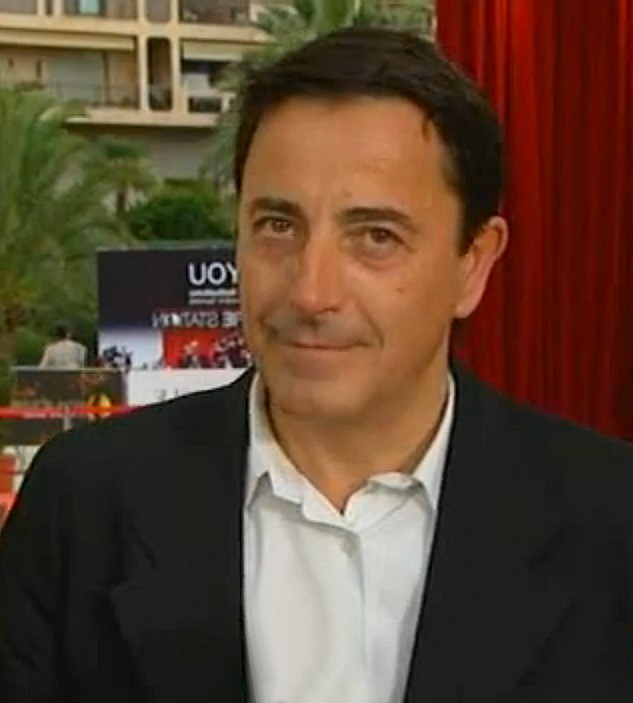
Hubert Besson, creator and producer of Plus belle la vie

Actor	Character	Seasons
Colette Renard	Rachel Lévy	seasons 1–5
Cécilia Hornus	Blanche Marci	seasons 1–18
Sylvie Flepp	Mirta Torres	seasons 1–18
Hélène Médigue	Charlotte Le Bihac	seasons 1–5
Serge Dupire	Vincent Chaumette	seasons 1–18
Michel Cordes	Roland Marci	seasons 1–18
Thierry Ragueneau	François Marci	seasons 1–2, 8 & 17–18
Pierre Martot	Léo Castelli	seasons 1–9 & 12–18
Rebecca Hampton	Céline Frémont	seasons 1–18
Geoffrey Sauveaux	Lucas Marci	seasons 1–2 & 18
Dounia Coesens	Johanna Marci	seasons 1–10, 14–15 & 18
Ambroise Michel	Rudy Torres	seasons 1–10 & 18
Aurélie Vaneck	Ninon Chaumette	seasons 1–10, 16 & 18
Sofiane Belmouden	Malik Nassri	seasons 1–4
Ibtissem Guerda	Aicha Djellal	season 1
Lætitia Milot	Mélanie Rinato	seasons 1–14
Richard Guedj	Charles-Henri Picmal	seasons 1–2 & 7
Alexandre Pottier	Antoine Frémont	season 1
Juliette Chêne	Juliette Frémont	seasons 1–4 & 8
Virgile Bayle	Guillaume Leserman	seasons 1–13
Anne Décis	Luna Torres	seasons 1–18
Alexandre Fabre	Charles Frémont	seasons 1–18
Laurent Kerusoré	Thomas Marci	seasons 1–18
Thibaud Vaneck	Nathan Leserman	seasons 1–8 & 10–18

=== Recurring cast ===
Actor	Character	Seasons
Fabienne Carat	Samia Nassri	seasons 1–18
Jean-François Malet	Jean-François Leroux	seasons 2–12
Valérie Baurens	Agathe Robin	season 2–6, 8 & 18
Cécile Auclert	Véra Madigan	seasons 2–5
Amalric Gérard	Jean-Baptiste Gauthier	seasons 2–4
Élodie Varlet	Estelle Cantorel	seasons 3–18
Jean-Charles Chagachbanian	Franck Ruiz	seasons 3–6 and 11–18
Franck Borde	Florian Estève	seasons 3–7 & 14
Ludovic Baude	Benoît Cassagne	seasons 4–14
Stéphane Henon	Jean-Paul Boher	seasons 4–18
Pascale Roberts	Wanda Legendre	seasons 4–13
Coline d'Inca	Sybille Cassagne	seasons 4–9 & 18
Audric Chapus	Raphaël Cassagne	seasons 4–8
David Baiot	Djawad Sangha	seasons 5–14 & 18
Marwan Berreni	Abdel Fedala	seasons 5–18
Léa François	Barbara Évenot	seasons 5–18
Rachid Hafassa	Karim Fedala	seasons 5–18
Françoise Bertin	Josiane Laval	season 5
Catherine Benguigui	Violette Garcin	season 6
Anne Canovas	Anémone Vitreuil	seasons 6–7 & 9–18
Caroline Bourg	Elsa Bailly	seasons 7–18
Joakim Latzko	Gabriel Riva	seasons 7–18
Avy Marciano	Sacha Malkavian	seasons 7–18
Geoffrey Piet	Jonas Malkavian	seasons 7–12
Stéphane Bierry	Stéphane Prieur	seasons 8–14
Gladys Cohen	Seta Malkavian	seasons 8–13 & 15–17
Sara Mortensen	Coralie Blain	seasons 8–15
Stéphanie Pareja	Jeanne Carmin	seasons 8–18
Marie Réache	Babeth Nebout	seasons 8–18
Jérôme Bertin	Patrick Nebout	seasons 9–18
Charles Schneider	Principal Rochat	seasons 9–18
Céline Vitcoq	Wendy Lesage	seasons 9–13
Lola Marois-Bigard	Ariane Hersant	seasons 13–18
Marie-Christine Adam	Marie-Christine Walter	seasons 16

== Impact ==
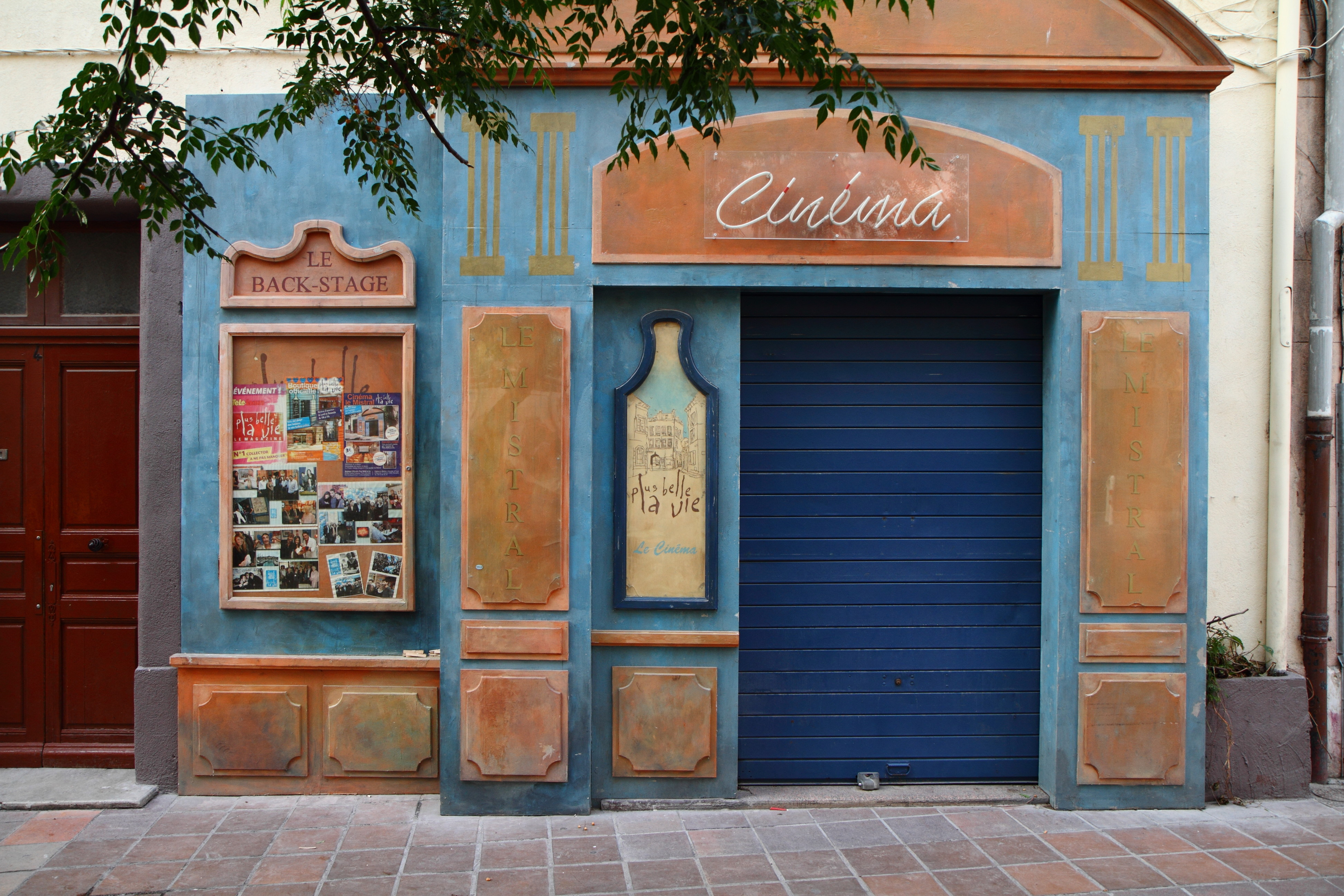
A movie theater in the Panier district of Marseille, inspired by Plus Belle la Vie

The series struggled to find its footing in the first season, but after striving to create more dynamic story lines, by the second season Plus belle la vie enjoyed regular audiences of five million viewers. On Valentine's Day 2006, a plot involving Nicolas Barrel's death drew an audience of 6,329,600. On 17 November 2008 Plus belle la vie received its highest ratings ever with over 6.8 million viewers and a 24.9% audience share.

For several years, the series regularly averaged audiences in excess of 5 million viewers and audience shares above 20% each weekday evening. In recent seasons, its viewing numbers have gradually declined.

This ratings slump worsened at the onset of the COVID-19 pandemic and, on 5 May 2022, France Télévisions announced the end of the series which took place on 18 November 2022, following "a substantial shift in viewing habits" after 18 years on air.

== See also ==
- List of French television series
