= Lola Marois =

French singer and actress

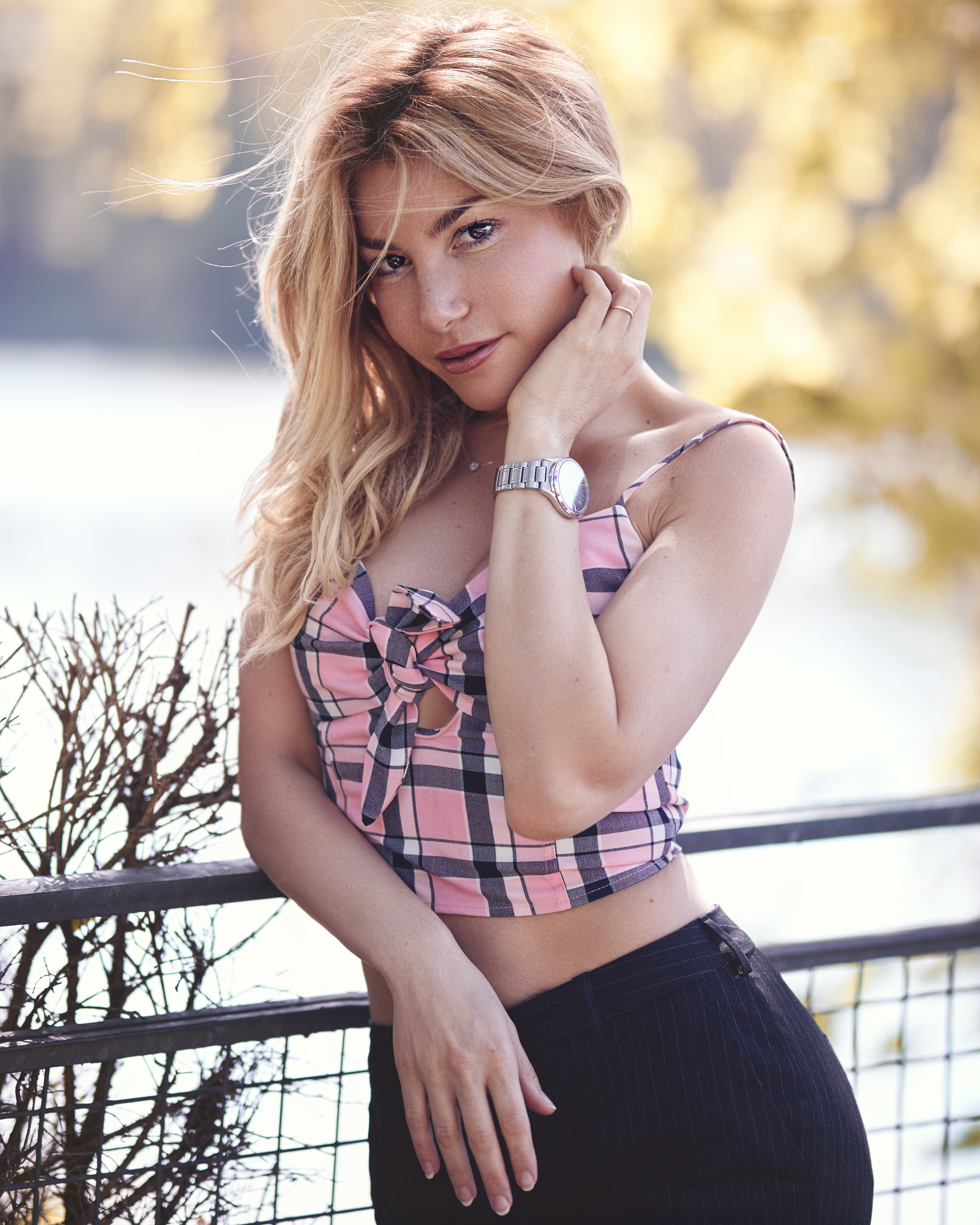
- Marois in 2018
- Education: Oscar Sisto Academy
- Occupations: Actress, comedian, singer
- Years active: 2003–present
- Notable work: Plus belle la vie
- Spouse: Jean-Marie Bigard
- Children: 2

Lola Marois, born in Paris, also known as Lola Marois-Bigard and Lola Bigard, is a French singer and comedian.

== Biography ==
She was born in about 1983. Marois's father was a fashion photographer; her mother was a writer of Algerian descent. She grew up in Spain, Los Angeles and Paris, where she earned a degree in literature with a minor in theater, and a DEUG in modern literature. She then took a Cours Florent at the Oscar Sisto Academy. She made her theatrical debut at 12 playing more than 10 pieces of Parisian theater from baroque to contemporary. Next, she played comic roles in the Théâtre Comédia, Théâtre Hébertot, Théâtre Saint-Georges

In May 2011 she married comedian Jean-Marie Bigard, with the mayor of the 7th arrondissement of Paris officiating. The couple became the parents of identical twins in 2013. Five years later, in 2017, Marois started a recurring role as Ariane Hersant in Plus belle la vie, a popular soap opera. She has released an album of pop music, Lola Marois, in Spain.

== Films ==
- 2010: Show buzz
- 2016: Le Cabanon rose
- 2017: Vive la crise!Jean-François Davy
- 2017: Vénéneuses Jean-Pierre Mocky
- 2017: Brice 3
- 2017: Chacun sa vie

== Television ==
- 2003: Le choising (45 episodes) – France 2
- 2012: Mon histoire vraie – TF1
- 2015: Groland – Canal +
- 2017: À votre service (Prime time special Marseille) MCE TV
- Since 2017: Plus belle la vie – France 3
- 2018: Qu'est ce qu'on attend pour être heureux – M6

== Short films ==
- 2008: Sweet home by Yilin Yang
- 2009: Filmer ou mourir by Stéphane Berthomieux
- 2009: Petite soirée chez Monsieur Vaillant by Arnold De Parescau

== Theatre ==
- 2003: A Midsummer Night's Dream, Shakespeare, Théâtre de Paris 20ème
- 2008: Clérambard by Marcel Aymé, Théâtre Hébertot
- 2009–2012: Couscous aux lardons by Farid Omri, Théâtre Montorgueil,
- 2011: Le Coup de la cigogne de Jean-Claude Isler, mise en scène Jean-Luc Moreau, Théâtre Saint-Georges
- 2012: Nuit de folie de John Zera et Hadrien Raccah – Théâtre du Gymnase
- 2014: Dix ans de Mariage by Alil Varda
- 2015: La Famille est dans le pré by Franck Le Hen
- 2015: Bonjour Ivresse by Franck Le Hen

== Discography ==
- 2009: Lola Marois

== Books ==
- 2013 : À demain mes amours...Le courageux combat de mes grands prématurés (biography)
- 2017 : Bad Girl (novel)
