= Alexandre Fabre =

French actor (born 1955)

Louis-Alexandre Fabre (born 17 March 1955) is a French actor, mostly known for his role of Charles Frémont in the series Plus belle la vie.

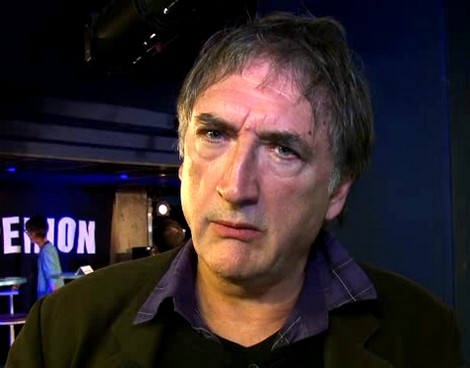
Alexandre Fabre in 2012.

== Biography ==
He was born in Tunisia where he lived until he was 10. As a child, at the time of the Tunisian Independence, his father had to go back to France, in Albi. Then the family moved to Marseille when Alexandre was 12. Then he settled in Neuilly-sur-Seine.

In Paris, he learnt acting as a young 20-year-old, then went back to Marseille where in played Ionesco, Racine, Molière, Dumas, and others: Toursky, Gymnase, la Criée. He also shot for TV and the cinema (French Connection 2 with Gene Hackman).

For almost ten years, he played his own shows (inspired from Rabelais, John Fante, Sony Labou Tansi...), in big cities but also in the Tunisian countryside, in Mauritania, Tchad, Congo-Brazzaville, Madagascar, Cameroun...). He plays Dom Juan of Molière in the 1993 Avignon Festival staged by Renata Ramos.

He spent 15 years living in Africa. In Brazzaville, he put on a musical with his daughter, aged 20. Then, he moved back to Marseille (his favourite city), where he currently lives.

In Paris, he still plays theater: (Offenbach, Edmond Rostand, Daniel Soulier, Agatha Christie...). In 2004, he auditioned for the role of Charles Frémont in France 3's famous series, Plus belle la vie.

== Movies ==
=== Cinema ===
- 1975: French Connection 2 (of John Frankenheimer) – Young Inspector
- 1976: Le Plein de super (of Alain Cavalier) – Jean-Loup
- 1980: Journal d'une maison de correction (of Georges Cachoux) – Le maniaque
- 1980: Retour à Marseille (of René Allio) – Un flic
- 1983: Cap canaille (of Juliet Berto) – Un homme de main
- 1984: Le Juge (of Philippe Lefebvre) – Equipe de Innocenti
- 2000: De l'histoire ancienne (of Orso Miret) – Libraire 1
- 2001: Mon père, il m'a sauvé la vie (of José Giovanni) – Maître Moro Giafferi

=== Television ===
- 1976: Les Lavandes et le réséda
- 1976: Le sanglier de Cassis
- 1976: Folies en miettes
- 1977: La Mer promise (de Jacques Ertaud) – Le lieutenant
- 1979: Roméo et Baucis (d'Hélène Misserly) – Georges
- 1979: Jean le Bleu (d'Hélène Martin)
- 1979: Le Roman du samedi, épisode : Le coffre et le revenant (de Roger Hanin)
- 1980: La Fortune des Rougon (d'Yves-André Hubert) – L'ami d'Antoine
- 1980: So long rêveuse (de Jacques Ordines)
- 1980: Les Dossiers éclatés : La Canne (de Jean-Pierre Gallo) – Le gendarme
- 1980: Trousse colline
- 1980: Thomas Gordon
- 1980: Le Carton rouge (d'Alain Quercy)
- 1980: L'Arrêt des cars
- 1980: La Fabrique, un conte de Noël (de Pascal Thomas)
- 1980: Mon cher Théo Van Gogh (de Max Gérard) – Gauguin
- 1981: La Chèvre d'or (de Jean Dasque) – Le gendarme
- 1981: Le Sang des Atrides (de Sam Itzkovitch)
- 1981: Le Fils père
- 1981: Ton vieil ami pierrot
- 1981: L'Abbé Faria
- 1981: L'inspecteur mène l'enquête (de Luc Godevais)
- 1981: Jeu de loi
- 1982: Délit de fuite (de Paul Seban)
- 1982: La Vie de Galilée (de Jacques Ordines)
- 1982: Le Secret des Andrônes (de Sam Itzkovitch)
- 1983: Microbidon (d'André Halimi)
- 1984: Insomnie de monsieur Plude (de Jean Dasque)
- 1991: Tête de pioche
- 1991: Les Cœurs brûlés (de Jean Sagols) – Veilleur de nuit
- 1998: L’Échappée – L'homme de la société
- 1998: Le Papa de Léa
- 1998: Le Monde à l'envers (de Charlotte Brandström)
- 2000: Aux frontières de la loi
- 2000: Sous le soleil – Startey
- 2001: Mon père, il m'a sauvé la vie
- 2002: Le juge est une femme (épisode : L'ami d'enfance) – Louis
- 2003: Le Coupable idéal
- 2003: Action justice : déclaré coupable
- 2003: Avocats et Associés (épisode : Le loup dans la bergerie) – Le juge Valas
- 2004–2022: Plus belle la vie – Charles Frémont
- 2005: Un coin d'azur (d'Heikkei Arekallio) – Le médecin militaire
- 2005: Le Proc, épisode : Le témoin – Sylvain Watteau
- 2007: L'Affaire Christian Ranucci : le Combat d'une mère (de Denys Granier-Deferre) – Roger Pommard
- 2009: Funky Documentary (documentary)

=== Short film ===
- 2012 : À la recherche du droit de Virgile Bayle et Jason Roffé
