= Leon Còrdas =

Occitan playwright (1913–1987)

Léon Cordes
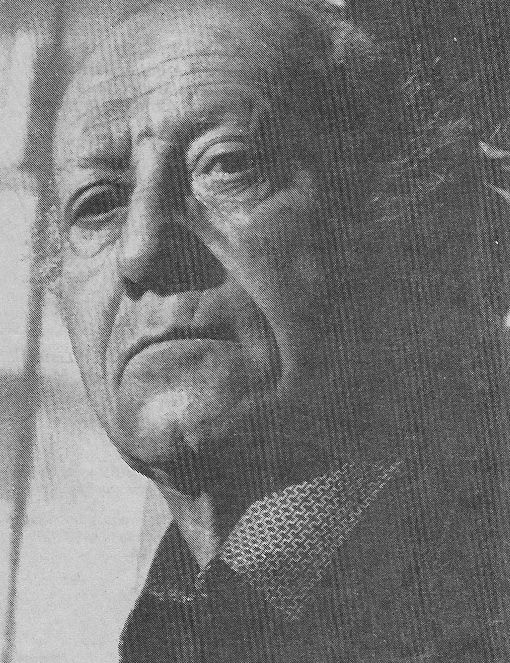
- The occitan author, in his latter days.
- Born: Siran, France
- Occupation: Poet

Leon Còrdas (1913 in Siran – 1987 in Montpellier) was an acclaimed Occitan playwright who also wrote poems, novels and short-stories. Còrdas tried his hand at acting and directing.

== Works ==
=== Drama ===
- La Font de Bonas Gràcias, (1954), Théodore Aubanel prize in 1955
- Menèrba 1210, (1985)

=== Poetry ===
- Aquarèla, (1946)
- Branca tòrta, (1964)
- Dire son si, (1974)

=== Prose ===
- Los Macarèls, (1973)
- Sèt pans, (1977)
- La Batalha dels teules, (1979)
