= Murders in... =

French television series

- Country of origin: France
- No. of seasons: 7
- No. of episodes: 39

Production
- Running time: 90 minutes

Original release
- Network: France 3 (France); RTS Deux (Switzerland); La Une (Belgium)
- Release: April 23, 2013 – present

Murders in... is a French television series, distributed on France 3 since 2013. Each episode centers around a mystery in a different city or region, often at a famous landmark. While some investigator pairings are repeated, usually each episode has an entirely new cast. The series is one of France 3's largest programs, followed by an average of 4 million viewers.

== Season 1 (2013–2014) ==
=== Episode 1: Murders in Saint-Malo ===
- Aired: April 23, 2013
- Cast: Louise Monot as Lieutenant Gwenaëlle Garrec and Bruno Solo as Chief Warrant Officer Eric Vautier
- Director: Lionel Bailliu
- Ratings: 4.7 million viewers / (17.8% of viewers) / Rank: 2

=== Episode 2: Murders in the Basque Country ===
- Aired: April 5, 2014
- Cast: Antoine Duléry as Vincent Becker and Claire Borotra as Marie Daguerre
- Director: Eric Duret
- Ratings: 4.1 million viewers / (17.6% of viewers) / Rank: 2

=== Episode 3: Murders in Pyla ===
- Alternate Title: "The Disappearance of Pyla"
- Aired: April 12, 2014
- Cast: Dounia Coesens as Élise Castel and Véronique Genest as Carole Castel
- Director: Didier Albert
- Ratings: 4.1 million viewers / (18.4% of viewers) / Rank: 2

=== Episode 4: Murders in Rocamadour ===
- Aired: May 3, 2014
- Cast: Clémentine Célarié as Sophie Lacaze and Grégori Derangère as Alexandre Delcroix
- Director: Lionel Bailliu (2)
- Ratings: 4 million viewers / (16.8% of viewers) / Rank: 3

=== Episode 5: Murders in Rouen ===
- Aired: May 24, 2014
- Cast: Frédéric Diefenthal as Didier Mege, Isabel Otero as Eva Chene, Philippe Duquesne as Ludovic and Damien Bonnard as Gabriel
- Director: Christian Bonnet
- Ratings: 3.7 million viewers / (16.9% of viewers) / Rank: 3

== Season 2 (2015) ==
=== Episode 6: Murders in Guérande ===
- Aired: February 21, 2015
- Cast: Antoine Duléry as Vincent Becker and Claire Borotra as Marie Daguerre
- Director: Eric Duret (2)
- Ratings: 4 million viewers / (17% of viewers) / Rank: 2

=== Episode 7: Murders on the Ile d'Yeu ===
- Aired: March 7, 2015
- Cast: Anne Richard as Isabelle Bonnefoy and Bernard Yerlès as Nicolas Lemeur
- Director: François Guérin
- Ratings: 3.9 million viewers / (16.9% of viewers) / Rank: 2

=== Episode 8: Murders in Étretat (also known as The Cliffs Murder) ===
- Aired: April 4, 2015
- Cast: Adriana Karembeu as Karine Zenco and Bruno Madinier as Victor Ortega
- Director: Laurence Katrian
- Ratings: 4.1 million viewers / (17.9% of viewers) / Rank: 2

=== Episode 9: Murders in Carcassonne ===
- Aired: May 9, 2015
- Cast: Rebecca Hampton as Angélique Demange, Bruno Wolkowitch as Raphaël Leprince, Philippe Nahon as Father Ancel and Bernard Blancan as William Malory
- Director: Julien Despaux
- Ratings: 4.2 million viewers / (18.6% of viewers) / Rank: 2

=== Episode 10: Murders at Mont Ventoux ===
- Aired: May 23, 2015
- Cast: Ingrid Chauvin as Alex Mejean and Thomas Jouannet as Marc Messac
- Director: Thierry Peythieu
- Ratings: 4.3 million viewers / (19.9% of viewers) / Rank: 2

== Season 3 (2015–16) ==
=== Episode 11: Murders in Collioure ===
- Aired: October 3, 2015
- Cast: Helena Noguerra as Alice Castel and Stéphane Freiss as Pascal Loube
- Director: Bruno Garcia
- Ratings: 4.3 million viewers / (19.3% of viewers) / Rank: 2

=== Episode 12: Murders in La Rochelle ===
- Aired: November 14, 2015
- Cast: Dounia Coesens as Justine Balmont and Philippe Caroit as Raphaël Weiss
- Director: Étienne Dhaene
- Ratings: 4.2 million viewers / (18.4% of viewers) / Rank: 2

=== Episode 13: Murders in Burgundy ===
- Aired: December 26, 2015
- Cast: Cristiana Reali as Mylène Deville and Franck Sémonin as Frédéric Tessier
- Director: Jérôme Navarro
- Ratings: 3.8 million viewers / (17.1% of viewers) / Rank: 2

=== Episode 14: Murders in Avignon ===
- Aired: February 27, 2016
- Cast: Catherine Jacob as Laurence Ravel, Lætitia Milot as Julie Ravel and Pascal Elso as Dimitri Bellac
- Director: Stéphane Kappes
- Ratings: 4.3 million viewers / (18.3% of viewers) / Rank: 2

=== Episode 15: Murders on the Ile de Ré ===
- Aired: April 23, 2016
- Cast: Lucie Lucas as Margaux Pelletier and Bruno Salomone as Vincent Pelletier
- Director: François Basset and Jules Maillard
- Ratings: 4.5 million viewers / (20% of viewers) / Rank: 2

=== Episode 16: Murders at Lac Léman ===
- Aired: May 21, 2016
- Cast: Corinne Touzet as Sandrine Zermatten and Jean-Yves Berteloot as Louis Jolly
- Director: Jean-Marc Rudnicki
- Ratings: 4.3 million viewers / (20% of viewers) / Rank: 2

== Season 4 (2016–2017) ==
=== Episode 17: Murders in La Ciotat ===
- Aired: September 24, 2016
- Cast: Philippe Bas as Batti Vergniot and Élodie Varlet as Anne Sauvaire
- Director: Dominique Ladoge
- Ratings: 3.5 million viewers / (17.4% of viewers) / Rank: 2

=== Episode 18: Murders in Dunkirk ===
- Aired: February 4, 2017
- Cast: Charlotte de Turckheim as Janie Roussel and Lannick Gautry as Eric Dampierre
- Director: Marwen Abdallah
- Ratings: 4.8 million viewers / (21.8% of viewers) / Rank: 1

=== Episode 19: Murders in Martinique ===
- Aired: February 25, 2017
- Cast: Olivier Marchal as Paul Ventura and Sara Martins as Léna Valrose
- Director: Philippe Niang
- Ratings: 4.2 million viewers / (17.8% of viewers) / Rank: 2

=== Episode 20: Murders in Grasse ===
- Aired: April 15, 2017
- Cast: Lorie as Sophie Mournel and Annie Grégorio as Marianne Dusseyre
- Director: Karim Ouaret
- Ratings: 3.7 million viewers / (17.8% of viewers) / Rank: 2

=== Episode 21: Murders in Aix-en-Provence ===
- Aired: May 13, 2017
- Cast: Astrid Veillon as Anne Giudicelli, Isabelle Vitari as Pauline Dorval and Andréa Ferréol as Eléonore Dorval
- Director: Claude-Michel Rome
- Ratings: 4.1 million viewers / (18.2% of viewers) / Rank: 3

=== Episode 22: Murders in Strasbourg ===
- Aired: May 27, 2017
- Cast: Olivier Sitruk as Maxime Keller, Hélène de Fougerolles as Katel Leguennec and Jean-Baptiste Maunier as Julian Mathis
- Director: Laurence Katrian (2)
- Ratings: 3.7 million viewers / (19.1% of viewers) / Rank: 2

== Season 5 (2017–2018) ==
=== Episode 23: Murders in The Landes ===
- Alternate Title: "Murder in Hossegor"
- Aired: September 7, 2017
- Cast: Xavier Deluc as Walter Beaumont, Barbara Cabrita as Isabelle Hirigoyen and Catherine Hosmalin as Suzanne Beaumont
- Director: Jean-Marc Thérin
- Ratings:

=== Episode 24: Murders in Auvergne ===
- Aired: September 30, 2017
- Cast: Frédéric Diefenthal as Bruno Romagnat and Sofia Essaïdi as Aurélie Lefaivre
- Director: Thierry Binisti
- Ratings:

=== Episode 25: Murders in Sarlat ===
- Aired: November 18, 2017
- Cast: Thierry Godard as Éric Pavin and Cécile Bois as Claire Dalmas
- Director: Delphine Lemoine
- Ratings:

=== Episode 26: Murders in Orléans ===
- Aired: January 20, 2018
- Cast: Michèle Bernier as Charlotte Marat and David Kammenos as Philippe Cransac
- Director: Jean-Marc Seban
- Ratings:

=== Episode 27: Murders in Oléron ===
- Aired: March 17, 2018
- Cast: Hélène Seuzaret as Captain Judith Valeix and Michel Cymes as Doctor Vincent Lazare
- Director: Thierry Binisti
- Ratings:

== Season 6 (2018–2019) ==
=== Episode 28: Murders in Cornouaille ===
- Aired: September 8, 2018
- Cast: Caroline Anglade as Marion Legay and Sagamore Stévenin as Tristan Legay
- Director: Frank Mancuso
- Ratings:

=== Episode 29: Murders in Haute-Savoie ===
- Aired: October 13, 2018
- Cast: Gwendoline Hamon as Claire Garibaldi and Thibault de Montalembert as Pierre Garibaldi
- Director: Rene Manzor
- Ratings:

=== Episode 30: Murders in Brides-les-Bains ===
- Aired: December 29, 2018
- Cast: Line Renaud as Claire Garibaldi and Patrick Catalifo as Julien Forest
- Director: Emmanuel Rigaut
- Ratings:

=== Episode 31: Murders in Morvan ===
- Aired: January 19, 2019
- Cast: Virginie Hocq as Maud Perrin and Bruno Wolkowitch as Julien Demarcy
- Director: Simon Astier
- Ratings:

=== Episode 32: Murders in Lorraine ===
- Aired: March 16, 2019
- Cast: Lilly-Fleur Pointeaux as Lola Paoli and Stéphane Bern as Nicolas Muller
- Director: Rene Manzor
- Ratings:

== Season 7 (2019–2020) ==
=== Episode 33: Murders in Colmar ===
- Aired: September 14, 2019
- Cast: Garance Thénault as Anaïs Lacombe and Pierre Arditi as Étienne Ronsard
- Director: Klaus Biedermann
- Ratings:

=== Episode 34: Murders in Lille ===
- Aired: September 28, 2019
- Cast: Annelise Hesme as Caroline Flament and Wolf-Denis Elion as William Henry
- Director: Laurence Katrian
- Ratings:

=== Episode 35: Murders in Belle Île ===
- Aired: October 26, 2019
- Cast: Charlotte de Turckheim as Commander Marie Lamblin and Nicolas Gob as Captain Thomas Keller
- Director: Marwen Abdallah
- Ratings:

=== Episode 36: Murders in Tahiti ===
- Aired: December 28, 2019
- Cast: Leslie Medina as Lieutenant Mareva Haumana, Jean-Michel Tinivelli as Commander Philippe Toussaint, and Vaimalama Chaves as the Beach House singer
- Director:
- Ratings:

=== Episode 37: Murders in Cotentin ===
- Aired: February 1, 2020
- Cast: Chloé Lambert as Hélène Ribero and Léa François as Alice Hamel
- Director: Jérémy Minui
- Ratings:

=== Episode 38: Murders in Jura ===
- Aired: February 15, 2020
- Cast: Sandrine Quétier as Anna Buisson and Pierre-Yves Bon as Eymeric Massoni-Tournault
- Director: Eric Duret
- Ratings:

=== Episode 39: Murders in Corrèze ===
- Aired: May 2, 2020
- Cast: Carole Bianic as Captain Léna Ribéro and Arié Elmaleh as Commander Axel Zeller
- Director: Adeline Darraux
- Ratings:
