= Hafid Aboulahyane =

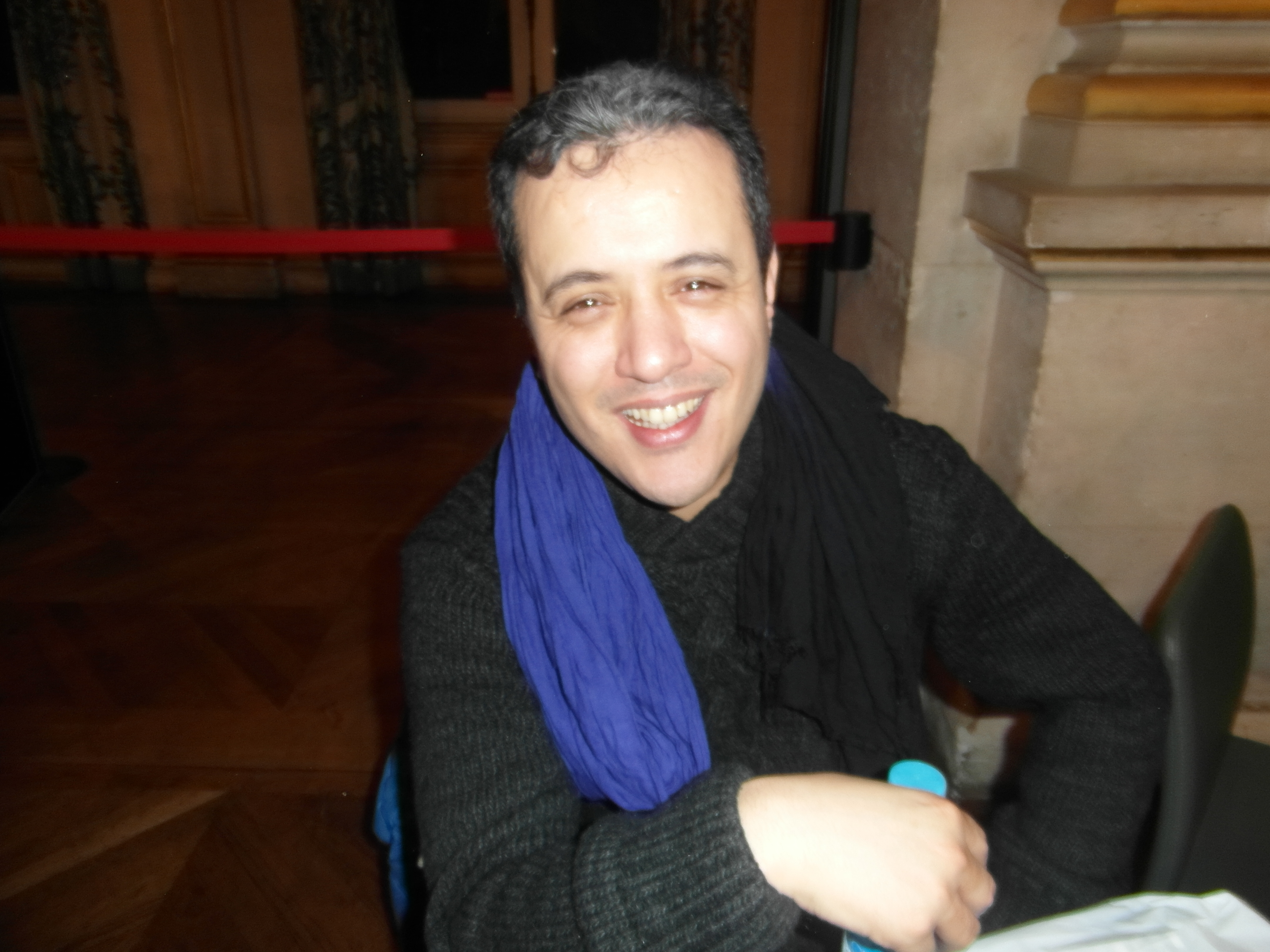
- Aboulahyane at the 21st Maghreb des Livres, Paris, February 2015
- Born: c. 1978; Les Ulis, Essonne, France
- Occupation: Actor · Writer · Director · Producer
- Years active: c.1997–present
- Known for: Founding production company Hafidgood; short films Le Poids du silence, Le Forum (2007), La Marche des crabes
- Notable work: Le Poids du silence; Le Forum (2007); La Marche des crabes (France/Morocco)
- Website: http://www.hafidgood.com

Hafid Aboulahyane (born c. 1978) is a French–Moroccan actor, writer, director and independent film producer from the Paris suburbs. He is known for several short films produced in the 2000s and early 2010s—including Le Poids du silence, Le Forum and La Marche des crabes—and for founding the independent production company Hafidgood.

== Early life ==
Aboulahyane grew up in Les Ulis (Essonne) in a working-class family; according to a 2006 profile he is the son of a Renault factory worker and was raised in the housing estate known as the Bosquet. A theatre teacher noticed him at about age 13 during an improvisation match, an event that set him on a path toward acting. He completed secondary studies in Paris and worked odd jobs in his late teens and early twenties (including selling apartments and cars) before beginning a professional career in performance.

== Career ==
Aboulahyane's early professional break came after he was seen on stage by an agent and was cast in television (the Navarro series is mentioned in contemporaneous press). He subsequently pursued stage and screen work while moving into writing and producing his own short films. He wrote and starred in a short, Le Poids du silence, in which the veteran actor Jacques Weber appears as the lawyer of Aboulahyane's character; Weber reportedly donated several days of his time to the production.

To gain creative control of his projects and finance his films, Aboulahyane founded the production company Hafidgood, investing his personal savings into the company. He has described running an independent production company as “a daily struggle.”

== Short films and festival coverage ==
Aboulahyane wrote, produced and directed several short films that were noted in the French independent film press. Le Forum (2007), a short addressing civic participation and voter registration, received coverage in the French film and culture press.

His film La Marche des crabes (France / Morocco) was shown in short-film programs and was the subject of critical commentary at film festivals. A review of short-film competition screenings at FESPACO 2011 discussed La Marche des crabes alongside other contemporary shorts and highlighted both strengths and weaknesses in Aboulahyane's film-making.

== Critical reception ==
Contemporary festival coverage and criticism note recurring features of Aboulahyane's work. The Africiné review singled out La Marche des crabes’ opening plan-sequence as a successful, risky shot, and praised the film’s generosity and the theme of an “impossible love” between a paraplégic man and a young woman; at the same time the reviewer observed that the film sometimes suffers from a lack of rhythmic breathing and insufficient space for characters to develop fully. The same critic grouped Aboulahyane with other filmmakers seeking to explore individual freedom against stifling social or moral codes.

Press coverage in Le Parisien emphasized Aboulahyane's charismatic screen presence and his determination as an independent producer; the article highlighted his use of self-production to avoid stereotypical casting and to retain control over the kinds of roles and stories he wanted to make. Jacques Weber's participation in Le Poids du silence was presented as an important endorsement.

Radio and media items also document Aboulahyane's activities and provide additional publicity for his short-film work.

== Selected filmography ==
- Le Poids du silence — short film; writer and actor; Jacques Weber appears as the lawyer (director: David Benmoussa).
- Le Forum (2007) — short film; writer / director / producer; received coverage in French independent press.
- La Marche des crabes — short film (France / Morocco); shown in short-film competition programs and reviewed at FESPACO 2011.
