= Siran, Hérault =

Siran
- Commune
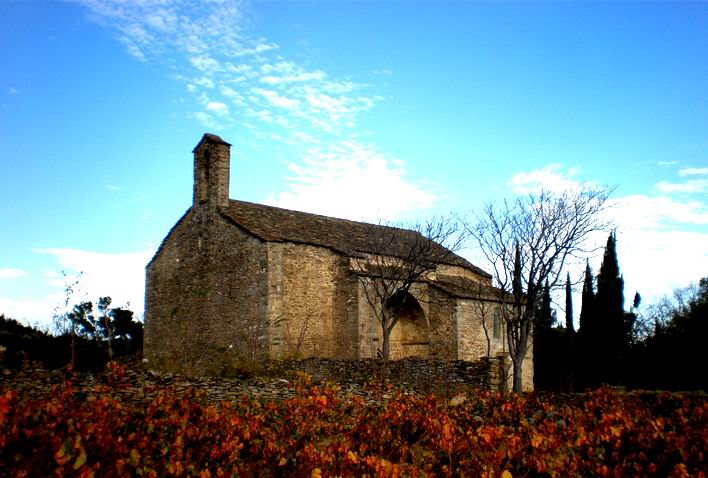
- The chapel of Centeilles

- Coat of arms
- Location of Siran
- Location within France Location within Occitanie
- Coordinates: 43°18′51″N 2°39′43″E
- Country: France
- Region: Occitania
- Department: Hérault
- Arrondissement: Béziers
- Canton: Saint-Pons-de-Thomières

Government
  - Mayor (2020–2026): Michel Carquet
- Area^{1}: 21.25 km^{2} (8.20 sq mi)
- Highest elevation: 491 m (1,611 ft)
- Lowest elevation: 77 m (253 ft)
- Population (2023): 754
  - Density: 35.5/km^{2} (91.9/sq mi)
- Time zone: UTC+01:00 (CET)
  - Summer (DST): UTC+02:00 (CEST)
- INSEE/Postal code: 34302 /34210
- ^{1} French Land Register data, which excludes lakes, ponds, glaciers > 1 km^{2} (0.386 sq mi or 247 acres) and river estuaries.

Siran (French pronunciation: [siʁɑ̃]; Occitan: Sira) is a commune in the Hérault department in the Occitanie region in southern France.

== See also ==
- Communes of the Hérault department
